= I Love You (Fontaines D.C. song) =

2022 single by Fontaines D.C.

Single by Fontaines D.C.

from the album Skinty Fia
- Released: 17 February 2022
- Recorded: 2021
- Genre: Post-punk
- Length: 5:12
- Label: Partisan
- Songwriters: Carlos O'Connell; Conor Curley; Conor Deegan III; Grian Chatten; Tom Coll
- Producer: Dan Carey

Fontaines D.C. singles chronology
"Jackie Down the Line" (2022)	"I Love You" (2022)	"Skinty Fia" (2022)

Music video
- "I Love You" on YouTube

"I Love You" is a song by Irish rock band Fontaines D.C. It was released on 17 February 2022 through Partisan Records as the second single from their third studio album, Skinty Fia, following "Jackie Down the Line". The song is the ninth track on the album.

Despite its title, the song is not a conventional love song. Lead vocalist Grian Chatten has described it as the band's most overt love letter to Ireland, written from the perspective of an emigrant who feels both devotion to the country and anger at the way it is governed.

== Music and lyrics ==
"I Love You" is structured in two halves. The first is slow and restrained, with Chatten singing over chiming guitars about how Ireland has changed and about his decision to leave it. The second half builds into a long, rapid-fire vocal passage that grows steadily more furious. Chatten said he chose the title partly to confront a cliché, and that the song moves from sadness about the state of the country towards a resolve that something must be done.

The lyrics criticise Ireland's political establishment, name-checking the country's main political parties, and refer to emigration, the housing crisis and the legacy of abuse in church-run institutions. Critics have read it as a portrait of emigrant guilt, combining homesickness, guilt about leaving and pride in the country.

== Background and release ==
On 14 February 2022, Valentine's Day, the band posted a short teaser of the song on social media and announced that the full track would be released later that week. "I Love You" was released on 17 February 2022 as the second single from Skinty Fia, just over a month after "Jackie Down the Line". The album followed on 22 April 2022.

=== Critical reception ===
Rolling Stone UK described the single as "brooding", while Rolling Stone called it a "conflicted ode to Ireland". Flood Magazine called it a "haunting homeland ode".

At the end of 2022, Alan Jacques of Live 95's Green and Live named "I Love You" his single of the year.

== Music video ==
The music video for "I Love You" was released on 17 February 2022, alongside the single. It was directed by Sam Taylor, who had previously directed the band's live promo for "A Hero's Death", and produced by Jordi Estapé. The video shows Chatten walking through a candle-lit church, calm during the first half of the song and visibly angrier in the second.

== Credits and personnel ==
=== Song ===
Fontaines D.C.

- Grian Chatten – vocals
- Carlos O'Connell – guitar
- Conor Curley – guitar
- Conor Deegan III – bass
- Tom Coll – drums

Additional personnel

- Dan Carey – production

=== Music video ===
- Director – Sam Taylor
- Producer – Jordi Estapé
