= Jackie Down the Line =

Single by Fontaines D.C.

from the album Skinty Fia
- Released: 12 January 2022
- Recorded: 2021
- Genre: Alternative rock
- Length: 4:01
- Label: Partisan
- Songwriters: Carlos O'Connell; Conor Curley; Conor Deegan III; Grian Chatten; Tom Coll
- Producer: Dan Carey

Fontaines D.C. singles chronology
"A Lucid Dream" (2020)	"Jackie Down the Line" (2022)	"I Love You" (2022)

Music video
- "Jackie Down the Line" on YouTube

"Jackie Down the Line" is a song by Irish band, Fontaines D.C. The song is the lead single off of their third studio album, Skinty Fia and was released on 12 January 2022.

"Jackie Down the Line" is the band's first song to chart in the United States, reaching number 40 in the Billboard Adult Alternative Airplay.

== Music and lyrics ==
The song is performed in a E minor key and has a tempo of 135 beats per minute. It has a standard tuning.

The song uses a toxic and abusive relationship as a metaphor for how the British treated the Irish when Ireland was under British rule. The person Sally in the song represents a former British colony.

== Background and release ==
The song was released on 12 January 2022 in both physical, digital, and streaming content as the lead single off of Skinty Fia, the third album by the band.

=== Critical reception ===
In an interview with Pitchfork, the song was described as "remorseless misanthrope at the center of mesmeric" single.

== Music video ==
The music video for "Jackie Down the Line" premiered on the band's YouTube channel on 11 January 2022. The music video was directed by Hugh Mulhern and produced by Alexander Handschuh, Kate Brady, and Laura Clayton. The music video features choreography from Blackhaine.

== Live performance ==
Fontaines D.C. first performed the song live on 14 January 2022 on The Tonight Show Starring Jimmy Fallon. Sam Moore with the New Musical Express described the performance as "surreal". Moore described the video and the performance as a "seemingly one-take video performing the track on stage, a strange set of events takes place around them which involves people dressed in pointed red hats, a bride and a crucifixion."

== Credits and personnel ==
=== Song ===
Fontaines D.C.

- Grian Chatten – vocals, 12-string acoustic guitar, tambourine
- Carlos O'Connell – guitar, art direction
- Conor Curley – guitar
- Tom Coll – drums, percussion
- Conor Deegan III – bass vi

Additional personnel

- Dan Carey – production, mixing, sonic manipulation, synthesizer
- Christian Wright – mastering
- Alexis Smith – engineering
- Aidan Cochrane – art direction, design
- Rory Dewar – design
- Ashley Willerton – lettering

=== Music video ===
- Director – Hugh Mulhern
- Producer – Alexander Handschuh
- Executive producer – Kate Brady and Laura Clayton
- Production company – Riff Raff Films
- DP – Eoin McLoughlin
- 1st AC – Karl Hui
- 2nd AC – Nina Mangold
- DIT – Ewan MacFarlan
- Key grip – Johnny Donne
- 2nd grip – Simon Ward
- Choreography – Blackhaine
- 1st AD – Daniel Castro Garcia
- Production assistant – Angela Mulhern
- Floor runner – Nicolay Milev
- Stylist – Celestine Cooney
- Stylist assistant – Honor Dangerfield
- Make-up – Alice Dodds
- Make-up assistant – Nik Paskauskas
- Production designer – Andy Hillman
- Designer co-ordinator – Saskia Wickins
- Design assistants – Rosie Gore, Laurel Sumner, Killian Fallon and Tonomi Kishimoto-Eley
- Editor – John Cutler
- Grade – Peter Oppersdorff at MPC
- Cast – Blackhaine, Gina Campone, Luca Bakos, Kaivalya Brewerton and Bianca Scout

== Charts ==
Chart performance for "Jackie Down the Line"
Chart (2022)	Peak position
Ireland (IRMA)	66
US Adult Alternative Airplay (Billboard)	40

== Certifications ==
Certifications for "Jackie Down the Line"
Region	Certification	Certified units/sales
United Kingdom (BPI)	Gold	400,000^{‡}
^{‡} Sales+streaming figures based on certification alone.
