= The Lounge Society =

English rock band

The Lounge Society are an English rock band from Yorkshire. After their 2021 EP Silk for the Starving, they released their debut album Tired of Liberty in 2022 on Speedy Wunderground. Speedy Wunderground is the label of Daniel De Mussenden Carey, who produced albums and songs for musical artists such as Geese, Foals, Wet Leg, Fontaines D.C., Slowthai, Squid, PVA, Chubby and the Gang, Caroline Polachek, Black Midi, Pumarosa, Grimes, and Sophie Hunger. The album Tired of Liberty was produced by Carey.

The Lounge Society was formed in Hebden Bridge in West Yorkshire and contains 4 members: Cam Davey, Hani Puskin Hussain (of Iranian descent), Archie Dewis, and Herbie May. They were featured on BBC Radio 1's Future Artists in September 2022.
