= A Hero's Death (song) =

Single by Fontaines D.C.

from the album A Hero's Death
- Released: 5 May 2020
- Recorded: August 2019–February 2020; Mr. Dan's Studios; London, United Kingdom
- Studio: Abbey Road Studios; London, United Kingdom
- Genre: Post-punk; surf rock; psychedelic rock
- Length: 4:18
- Label: Knitting Factory; Partisan
- Songwriters: Carlos O'Connell; Conor Curley; Conor Deegan III; Grian Chatten; Tom Coll
- Producer: Dan Carey

Fontaines D.C. singles chronology
"Boys in the Better Land" (2019)	"A Hero's Death" (2020)	"I Don't Belong" (2020)

Remix cover
- Soulwax remix cover

Music video
- "A Hero's Death" on YouTube

"A Hero's Death" is a song by Irish post-punk band, Fontaines D.C. The song is the lead single for their second studio album of the same name. The song was released on 5 May 2020 through Partisan Records.

"A Hero's Death" was the band's first song to chart, reaching number 30 in Scotland and number 67 in the UK Singles Downloads Chart.

== Music video ==
The music video for the song was directed by Hugh Mulhern and produced by Aaron McEnaney and Theresa Adebiyi. The music video features a fictional late night show called The Georgie Barnes Show starring a charismatic talk show host named Georgie Barnes, (played by Aidan Gillen) whose co-host is a puppet. The series features the talk show host greeting the band prior to them playing a song on the show, but becoming existential when the band seems to show more appreciation to the puppeteer (Bryan Quinn) and the puppet rather than the host.

== Live performances ==
The first live performance of the song came on July 12, 2020, on Later... with Jools Holland when the band performed the song. Due to the COVID-19 pandemic, the band members performed in different locations and were simulcasted for an "At Home" performance of the song. The first live performance of the band together was on January 28, 2021, when the band performed on The Tonight Show Starring Jimmy Fallon.

== Charts ==
Chart (2020)	Peak position
Ireland (IRMA)	90
Scottish Singles Sales (Official Charts)	30
UK Singles Downloads (Official Charts)	67
