= I Don't Belong =

Single by Fontaines D.C.

from the album A Hero's Death
- Released: 9 June 2020
- Genre: Post-punk; surf rock
- Length: 4:13
- Label: Partisan; Rough Trade
- Producer: Dan Carey

Fontaines D.C. singles chronology
"A Hero's Death" (2020)	"I Don't Belong" (2020)	"Televised Mind" (2020)

Music video
- "I Don't Belong" on YouTube

"I Don't Belong" is a song by Irish band Fontaines D.C. from their second studio album, A Hero's Death (2020). The song was written by Carlos O'Connell, Conor Curley, Conor Deegan III, Grian Chatten and Tom Coll, while production was handled by Dan Carey. It was released on 9 June 2020 by Rough Trade and Partisan Records as the second single from the album.

A mid-tempo post-punk song, "I Don't Belong", is about dismissing expectations imposed by other people onto themselves. The production of the song features needeled electric guitars, a bass guitar, and drums, with elements of psychedelic and surf rock. Thematically, "I Don't Belong" discusses various scenarios that trace back to the message of the track. The opening is about soldier who has his military service commended by his country, but rejects the medal as the soldier sees the acceptance of the medal as compromising their personal principles. The second verse focuses about a fight breaking out in a bar, due to oneself refusing to be enticed by friendliness or kindness.

Upon the single's release, "I Don't Belong" received critical acclaim from contemporary music critics, with some in retrospect, calling it one of the most musically mature singles on the album. Praise was directed at Chatten's singing and the overall song structure, and Carey's production of the track.

Commercially, "I Don't Belong" was the band's second single to chart, the first being the self-titled track for the album, which was released earlier that spring. The song peaked at 86 in the Irish Singles Chart. One music video was made to accompany the track, which was directed by Deegan III and produced by Hugh Mulhern, was released on 10 June. The visual depicts lead singer, Chattan, singing across the Irish countryside while going on a walk.

== Release and promotion ==
=== Live performances ===
The song was released during the worldwide COVID-19 pandemic, limiting the band's ability to perform the song live or in front of a live audience. Due to the pandemic and related vaccination rollout, the first live performance of the song was during a livestream on 23 November 2020 at the O2 Academy Brixton. The band did not perform the song in front of a live audience until 2 August 2021, when they performed at the Pryzm nightclub in Kingston upon Thames, United Kingdom.

An acoustic version of the song premiered on 16 November 2020. It was filmed in October 2020 at La Blogothèque in Paris.

== Commercial performance ==
"I Don't Belong" was the band's second single to chart in a commercial chart, reaching 86 in their home nation of Ireland in the Irish Singles Chart.

== Music video ==
A corresponding music video for the song was released on 10 June 2020. The music video was shot in March and April 2020 with in Skerries, County Dublin, Ireland, the hometown of lead singer, Grain Chatten. The video, directed by bassist Conor Deegan III, shows Chatten singing walking past numerous sites in Skerries before ultimately being submerged in the water on the coast. The music video, originally planned to be shot in London, was shot in Skerries due to the onset of the COVID-19 pandemic. Basssit Connor Deegan III explained that the band "had a whole different video shoot planned in London" for the track. The purpose of the filming in Skerries was to "use the limitations to our benefit. To try to match the emotional feel of the song but without being heavy-handed. Telling a visual story parallel to the lyrics."

Deegan further told NME that Chatten's character "goes on a walk, passing by all these places. He’s telling us this dramatic story that slowly grows as the verses go on. At the start you do and you don’t really get a sense of the anxiety or negativity to come. It’s buried under the surface. At the end he submerges himself, completely consumed by his inner thoughts finally coming out into the world."

== Charts ==
Chart (2020)	Peak position
Ireland (IRMA)	86

== Credits and personnel ==
Credits adapted from A Hero's Death album liner notes.

- Grian Chatten – vocals, tambourine
- Carlos O'Connell – guitar
- Conor Curley – guitar, piano
- Tom Coll – drums, percussion
- Conor Deegan – bass guitar
- Dan Carey – production, mixing
