= Heartworms (musician) =

English musician

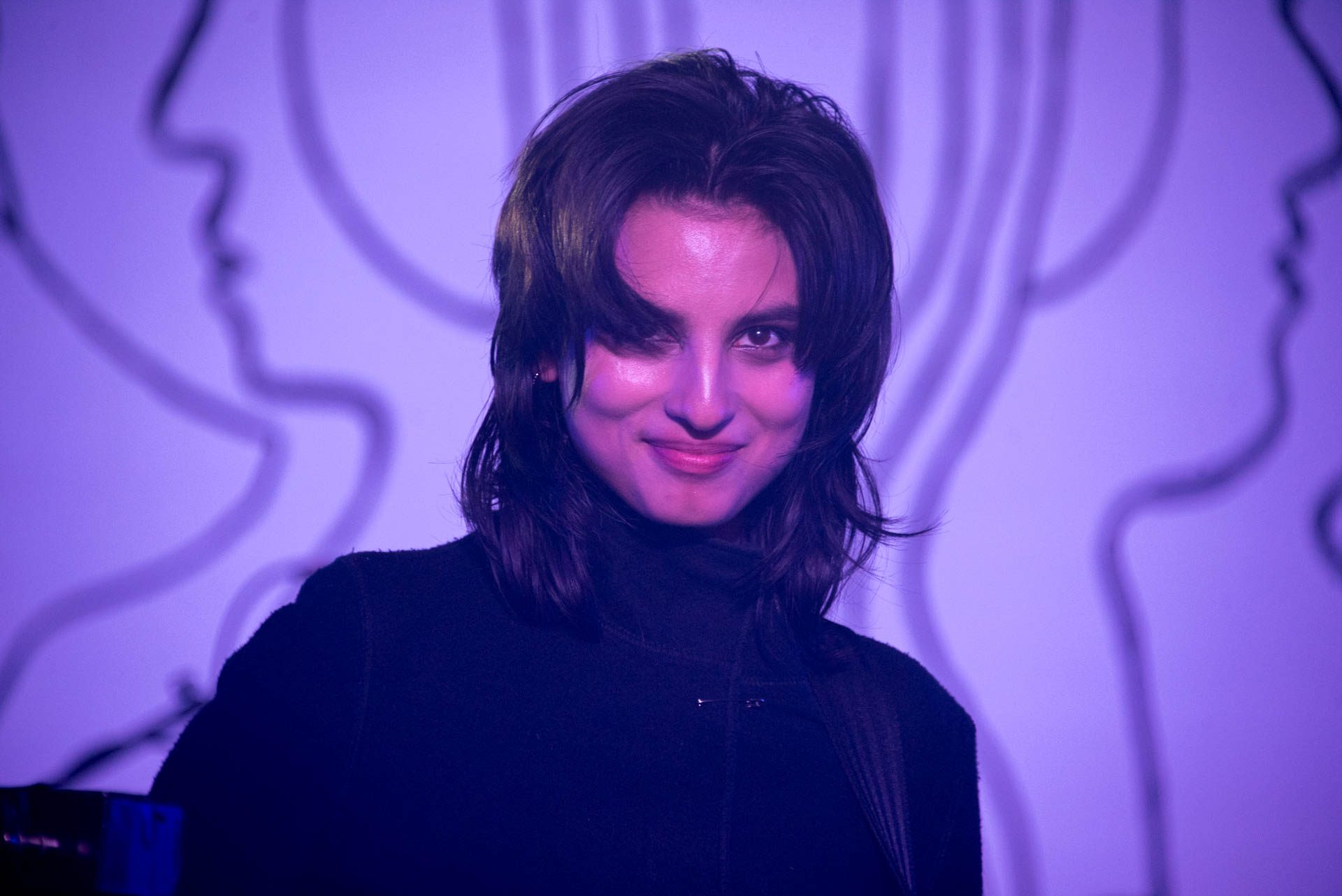
- Heartworms performing at End of the Road festival in August 2024

Background information
- Born: Josephine Orme; 1998 or 1999 (age 27–28); London, England
- Genres: Post-punk; gothic rock; dance-punk
- Years active: 2020–present
- Label: Speedy Wunderground

Jojo Orme, known professionally as Heartworms, is an English musician.

== Early life ==
Josephine Orme was born in central London, England in 1998 or 1999. She has Afghan and Pakistani heritage on her father's side, and Danish and Chinese on her mother's. Orme was raised in Cheltenham, She grew up with the music her mother listened to, including artists such as Hot Chocolate, Fleetwood Mac, Michael Jackson, and Prince. She left home at 14 to enter foster care. Orme studied Production and Performance at South Gloucestershire and Stroud College wanting to become a producer as "there's not many in the industry".

Orme has been diagnosed with autism and ADHD.

== Career ==
Orme took the name 'Heartworms' from the Shins 2017 album of the same name. She met producer Dan Carey over Instagram, and he asked her to send him some demos. Much of her early career was spent performing at the Windmill venue in Brixton, alongside Black Country, New Road, Goat Girl, the Last Dinner Party and PVA. In 2022, she signed to Carey's Speedy Wunderground label, and released the single "Consistent Dedication". Her debut EP A Comforting Notion was released in 2023, alongside a limited edition Airfix Spitfire model. She went on to earn support slots with the Kills and St Vincent.

In February 2025, Orme's debut album Glutton for Punishment was released to critical acclaim, including a five-star review from NME.

== Artistry ==
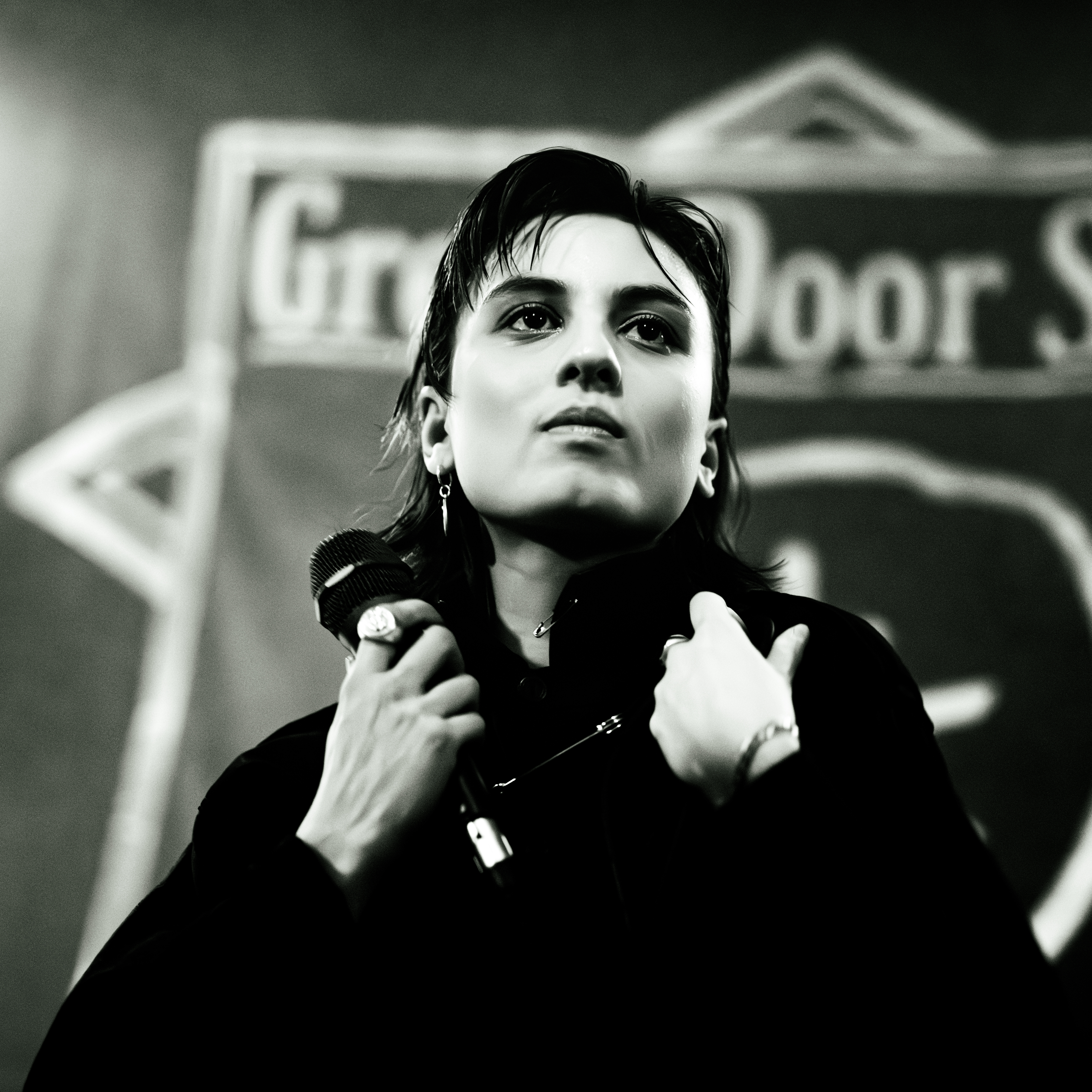
Orme performing at the Green Door Store, Brighton in 2023

Heartworms' music has been categorised by critics as post-punk, gothic rock and dance punk. She often incorporates elements of electroclash, post-industrial, 1990s and 2000s techno and electronic dance music.

She said she "discovered the Cure and Siouxsie and the Banshees" while at university and was attracted to what was musically "dark". Her other influences include PJ Harvey and her album To Bring You My Love (1995), Killing Joke's Killing Joke (1980), Grauzone's Grauzone (1981), the Sisters of Mercy's Floodland (1987), Nick Cave and the Bad Seeds' Push the Sky Away (2013), Sóley's Krómantík (2014), Nox Arcana's Gothic (2015), Drahla's Useless Coordinates (2019), Interpol and the Clash - plus classical music composers like Frédéric Chopin.

== Discography ==
=== Albums ===
- Glutton for Punishment (2025)

=== EPs ===
- A Comforting Notion (2023)

=== Singles ===
- "What Can I Do" (2020)
- "Consistent Dedication" (2022)
- "May I Comply" (2023)
- "Jacked" (2023)
- "Warplane" (2024)
- "Extraordinary Wings" (2025)
- "Guess I'm Stuck in the Dark" (2026)
