= Skinty Fia =

Studio album by Fontaines D.C.
- Released: 22 April 2022
- Recorded: 2021
- Genre: Post-punk
- Length: 44:52
- Label: Partisan
- Producer: Dan Carey

Fontaines D.C. chronology
A Hero's Death (2020)	Skinty Fia (2022)	Romance (2024)

Singles from Skinty Fia
- 1. "Jackie Down the Line" Released: 12 January 2022; 2. "I Love You" Released: 17 February 2022; 3. "Skinty Fia" Released: 21 March 2022; 4. "Roman Holiday" Released: 19 April 2022

Skinty Fia is the third studio album by Irish rock band Fontaines D.C. It was released on 22 April 2022 via Partisan Records. Like the band's two previous albums – 2019's Dogrel and 2020's A Hero's Death – Skinty Fia was produced by Dan Carey. Its title refers to an old Irish saying that drummer Tom Coll's great-aunt used to say; the phrase "Skinty Fia" translates to "the damnation of the deer". Both the title and the cover art allude to the extinct Irish elk, also known as the "giant deer".

Skinty Fia became the band's first number-one album in both Ireland and the UK. It reached number two in the Netherlands, and also placed in the top 10 of Belgium, France, Germany and Switzerland.

The album garnered the band a win for the Brit Award for International Group at the 2023 Brit Awards and a nomination for Album of the Year at the Choice Music Prize for the year 2022.

== Background and recording ==
The band released their second album A Hero's Death in July 2020 and embarked on a tour, which had been delayed due to the COVID-19 pandemic, to support it. Plans for the third album began in the band's hometown of Dublin during the COVID-19 lockdowns, where they began sharing and recording demos. Chatten was inspired by an accordion gifted to him by his mother for Christmas, realising "that that was an interesting place for me to go on the next record" despite his lack of experience with the instrument. They were also inspired by the Primal Scream album XTRMNTR (2000) and the drum and bass artist Roni Size, wanting to "[recreate] electronic sounds with guitars", according to guitarist Carlos O'Connell.

Recording for Skinty Fia took place in 2021 in London with regular producer Dan Carey. The songs were written during the day, which Chatten deemed a healthy and structured process, and recorded at night to create a level of uncertainty.

== Composition ==
The opening track "In ár gCroíthe go deo" features a refrain sung in Irish which translates to "in our hearts forever". The band had read of a recently deceased Irish woman living in England whose family had wished to engrave the phrase on her gravestone. However, the Church of England ruled that the use of the Irish phrase could be deemed "political" or "provocative". After much criticism from the Irish community, the decision was eventually overturned and, on that day, the band recorded vocals for the song.

"Big Shot" is the only song on the album written by O'Connell. Lyrically, it depicts "fame, stardom, and the guilt which surrounds them" and his battles with his own ego due to the band's success.

== Promotion ==
The album was announced on 12 January 2022, to coincide with the release of its lead single "Jackie Down the Line". A second single, "I Love You", was released just over a month later on 17 February 2022, a song which the band described as “the first overtly political song we've written”

== Critical reception ==
Professional ratings
Aggregate scores
Source	Rating
AnyDecentMusic?	8.3/10
Metacritic	85/100
Review scores
Source	Rating
AllMusic	4/5 stars
The A.V. Club	C+
Clash	8/10
DIY	5/5 stars
The Guardian	4/5 stars
The Line of Best Fit	10/10
MusicOMH	5/5 stars
NME	5/5 stars
Pitchfork	8.0/10
The Skinny	3/5 stars

The album was met with critical acclaim upon release. The Line of Best Fit awarded the album a perfect score of 10/10 calling Skinty Fia "a cascading third album that reveals as much as it continues to hide." NME called Fontaines D.C. a "generational band [that] grapples with heritage." They gave the record five stars calling it a "a breathtaking collection that’s like nothing they’ve ever done before."

Writing in The Guardian, Alexis Petridis praised the band for constantly inverting expectations of them, saying: "there’s something cheering about Fontaines DC’s bold refusal to join in, to deal instead in shades of grey and equivocation. There’s also something bold about their disinclination to rely on the most immediate aspect of their sound." He called Skinty Fia "more measured and reflective" than previous records, with it boasting "few examples of their punky full-pelt approach." Ultimately, he thought the album was another leap forward for the band and gave it four stars out of five. Pitchfork awarded the album an 8.0. They praised the band's ability to tap into alienation and isolation, saying: "By burrowing into Fontaines D.C.’s particular experiences as strangers in a strange land, Skinty Fia ultimately homes in on the eternal fears—of growing old, bored, bitter, and unloved—that unite us all."

Skinty Fia featured in many end of year lists. As well as awarding the band their 'Best Band in the World' award in 2022, NME also ranked Skinty Fia at #4 in their '50 Best Albums of 2022.' The Guardian ranked it at #9 in their 50 best albums of the year. Albumism ranked it at #74 in their "100 Best Albums of 2022".Skinty Fia was also nominated for an Ivor Novello award in the 'Best Album' category.

== Track listing ==
All music by Grian Chatten, Tom Coll, Conor Curley, Conor Deegan III and Carlos O'Connell - All lyrics by Grian Chatten, except "Big Shot" lyrics by Carlos O'Connell.

Skinty Fia track listing
No.	Title	Length
1.	"In ár gCroíthe go deo"	5:59
2.	"Big Shot"	4:13
3.	"How Cold Love Is"	3:24
4.	"Jackie Down the Line"	4:01
5.	"Bloomsday"	4:30
6.	"Roman Holiday"	4:28
7.	"The Couple Across the Way"	3:56
8.	"Skinty Fia"	3:55
9.	"I Love You"	5:05
10.	"Nabokov"	5:21
Total length:		44:52

Japanese edition bonus track
No.	Title	Length
11.	"I Love You" (live at Alexandra Palace)	4:52
Total length:		49:52

Skinty Fia go deo disc 2 additional track listing
No.	Title	Length
1.	"Big Shot" (live at Glastonbury)	3:39
2.	"Jackie Down the Line" (Skinty Fia sessions)	4:38
3.	"Roman Holiday" (Skinty Fia sessions)	3:52
4.	"I Love You" (Skinty Fia sessions)	4:34
5.	"One" (Skinty Fia sessions)	3:34
6.	"Twinkle" (Skinty Fia sessions)	4:45
7.	"The Couple Across the Way" (Skinty Fia sessions)	3:48
8.	"In ár gCroíthe go deo" (Orbital remix)	5:57

== Personnel ==
Adapted from Discogs.

Fontaines D.C.

- Grian Chatten – vocals, accordion, 12-string acoustic guitar, tambourine
- Carlos O'Connell – guitar, 12-string acoustic guitar, backing vocals, celeste, Clavioline, xylophone, art direction
- Conor Curley – guitar, 12-string acoustic guitar, backing vocals
- Tom Coll – drums, percussion
- Conor Deegan III – bass guitar, Bass VI, backing vocals, bouzouki, piano, whistling

Additional personnel

- Dan Carey – production, mixing, sonic manipulation, synthesizer, swarmatron, effects
- Christian Wright – mastering
- Alexis Smith – engineering
- Aidan Cochrane – art direction, design
- Rory Dewar – design
- Ashley Willerton – lettering

== Charts ==
=== Weekly charts ===
Weekly chart performance for Skinty Fia
Chart (2022–2026)	Peak position
Australian Albums (ARIA)	24
Austrian Albums (Ö3 Austria)	20
Belgian Albums (Ultratop Flanders)	4
Belgian Albums (Ultratop Wallonia)	3
Danish Albums (Hitlisten)	33
Dutch Albums (Album Top 100)	2
French Albums (SNEP)	7
German Albums (Offizielle Top 100)	5
Irish Albums (IRMA)	1
Italian Albums (FIMI)	12
New Zealand Albums (RMNZ)	22
Portuguese Albums (AFP)	177
Scottish Albums (Official Charts)	1
Spanish Albums (Promusicae)	26
Swiss Albums (Schweizer Hitparade)	9
UK Albums (Official Charts)	1
UK Independent Albums (Official Charts)	1
US Heatseekers Albums (Billboard)	3

=== Year-end charts ===
Year-end chart performance for Skinty Fia
Chart (2022)	Position
Belgian Albums (Ultratop Flanders)	128

== Certifications ==
Region	Certification	Certified units/sales
United Kingdom (BPI)	Gold	100,000^{‡}
^{‡} Sales+streaming figures based on certification alone.
