= Glutton for Punishment =

Glutton(s) for Punishment may refer to:

- Glutton for Punishment (album), 2025 debut album by Heartworms
- Glutton for Punishment (TV program), a discontinued TV program on Food Network
- Gluttons for Punishment, 2005 double live album by Spock's Beard
