= A Comforting Notion =

EP by Heartworms
- Released: March 24, 2023
- Length: 16:34
- Label: Speedy Wunderground
- Producer: Dan Carey

Heartworms chronology
A Comforting Notion (2023)	Glutton for Punishment (2025)

Singles from A Comforting Notion
- 1. "Consistent Dedication" Released: 9 September 2022; 2. "Retributions Of An Awful Life" Released: 17 January 2023

A Comforting Notion is the debut EP by English musician Heartworms. It was produced by Dan Carey and released through his imprint Speedy Wunderground on 24 March 2023. The EP was met with positive reception from music critics.

== Background and release ==
Heartworms was signed to record producer Dan Carey's imprint Speedy Wunderground after he was impressed by her demos. She released the single "Consistent Dedication" on 9 September 2022, and released the single "Retributions Of An Awful Life" on 17 January 2023. A Comforting Notion was released through Speedy Wunderground on 24 March 2023.

== Composition ==
A Comforting Notion was produced by Dan Carey. It opens with the track "Consistent Dedication", which incorporates pulsating bass lines, metallic guitars, and synthesizers. Heartworms's vocals on the track switch from whispering to screaming, and she delivers lyrics which were described as "oblique" by John Amen of The Line of Best Fit. The following track, "Retributions Of An Awful Life", features "angular guitars" and "propulsive rhythms", according to Under the Radar's Andy Von Pip. Midway through the song, an instrumental segment built on a drone fluctuates in volume. On the title track, Heartworms's voice is pained and more animated. Compression and reverb effects are applied to her vocals, which Amen said gave them "a 'transistor' effect". The final track on the EP, "24 Hours", contains "metronomic rhythms" that "build steadily and become increasingly urgent", according to Von Pip. The song combines spoken-word and melodic vocal performances, and builds into a crescendo. Heartworms said that the song is about "being at secondary [school] and just not fitting in".

== Critical reception ==
Professional ratings
Aggregate scores
Source	Rating
Metacritic	95/100
Review scores
Source	Rating
DIY	5/5 stars
The Line of Best Fit	8/10
Under the Radar	8/10
NME	5/5 stars

According to the review aggregator Metacritic, A Comforting Notion received "universal acclaim" based on a weighted average score of 95 out of 100 from 4 critic scores. It received positive reviews from DIY, The Line of Best Fit, Under the Radar, and NME.

== Track listing ==
No.	Title	Length
1.	"Consistent Dedication"	3:09
2.	"Retributions Of An Awful Life"	5:25
3.	"A Comforting Notion"	3:35
4.	"24 Hours"	4:23
Total length:		16:34
