= Tired of Liberty =

Studio album by The Lounge Society
- Released: 17 June 2022
- Genre: Post-punk, indie rock
- Length: 39:53
- Label: Speedy Wunderground
- Producer: Dan Carey

Singles from Tired of Liberty
- 1. "Blood Money" Released: 9 May 2022; 2. "No Driver" Released: 6 July 2022; 3. "Upheaval" Released: 3 August 2022

Tired of Liberty is the debut album by English post-punk band The Lounge Society, released on 17 June 2022 by Speedy Wunderground, the independent label of producer Dan Carey. Upon release, Tired of Liberty received critical acclaim, with reviewers praising the album's energy and political lyrical themes.

== Background and recording ==
The Lounge Society formed in Hebden Bridge in West Yorkshire and were signed to producer Dan Carey when the members were in school at age fifteen. Vocalist Cam Davey discussed that the concept of the album was and interplay between personal and political themes, with the title reflecting both being "tired of how liberty is manipulated or used as a weapon". The band composed the lyrics and music for Tired of Liberty in a "democratic" and "collaborative" process involving all band members, with many members changing instruments across recordings. Recording of the album with Carey used an "ambient room mixing" approach in which the band moved the recording microphones further away throughout recording sessions to create a "natural room sound".

== Release and promotion ==
Tired of Liberty was announced in May 2022 and released on 26 August, led by the single Blood Money, accompanied by a music video directed by Alex Evans of agency Comes With Fries. A second single, No Driver, was released on 6 July 2022, a described by the band as a song about "the human mind reaching breaking point". The third and final single, Upheaval, was released on 3 August 2022, described as a song with a "calmer atmosphere" by the band.

== Critical reception ==
Professional ratings
Aggregate scores
Source	Rating
Metacritic	82%
Review scores
Source	Rating
The Line of Best Fit	7/10
Loud and Quiet	7/10
Mojo	4/5 stars
Sputnikmusic	4.2/5

According to review aggregator Metacritic, Tired of Liberty received "universal acclaim" from critics upon release. Lana Williams of The Line of Best Fit commended the album's "experimentation" and "musical intricacies" as a mature progression, highlighting the lyrics and concept of the album as a "politically veined and societally oriented shout against the world's injustices". Describing the album as a "ferocious and freentic" set of songs and one of the "year’s finest" albums, Sputnikmusic found the band to function as a "tight unit", highlighting the "boundless energy" of percussionist Archie Dewis' performance. Drawing comparisons between tracks and bands such as Shame, These New Puritans and Orange Juice, Lisa Wright of DIY found Tired of Liberty to "shine" when the band "embrace the full flood" of their influences. Robert Davidson of Loud and Quiet found the album to have an "undeniably, potentially game-changingly special quality", citing the "lacerating lyrics", spontaneous production style and "genuine fire", whilst noting the sound of the band did not yet feel "singular".

== Track listing ==
Tired of Liberty track listing
No.	Title	Length
1.	"People are Scary"	3:33
2.	"Blood Money"	3:32
3.	"No Driver"	4:05
4.	"Beneath the Screen"	2:16
5.	"North is Your Heart"	3:16
6.	"Last Breath"	2:59
7.	"Remains"	4:07
8.	"Boredom is a Drug"	3:08
9.	"It's Just a Ride"	3:14
10.	"Upheaval"	3:50
11.	"Generation Game"	5:53
Total length:		39:53

== Personnel ==
- Archie Dewis, Cameron Davey, Hani Paskin Hussain, Herbie May – Performance
- Dan Carey – Producer
- Alexis Smith – Engineer
- Jason Mitchell – Mastering
