= Slice (EP) =

EP by O.
- Released: 24 November 2023
- Genre: Jazz-rock; punk jazz
- Length: 17:50
- Language: English
- Label: Speedy Wunderground
- Producer: Dan Carey

O. chronology
Slice (2023)	WeirdOs (2024)

“We played loads of gigs before we ever got in the studio, so we had lots of tracks to choose from. We picked these four because they’re all quite different from one another, while showing off all the styles we like to play.”

—Drummer Tash Keary on selecting songs for Slice.

Slice is a 2023 extended play album by British band O. It has received positive reviews from critics.

== Reception ==
Slice received 4 out of 5 stars in DIY from Daisy Carter for demonstrating "just how much can be done with a pair of drumsticks, a baritone sax, and some significant pedal wizardry", resulting in "a project that’s short but sweet, cohesive and well-rounded". In Dork, Rebecca Kestevan gave this release 5 out of 5, stating that "O. demonstrate a level of musicianship which borders on the outrageous" and called it "a funky, perfectly ordered disorder, which feels on the brink of falling into total chaos at any given moment". Laura Molloy noted the synergy of the musicians in NME and gave this release 4 out of 5 stars for displaying how the band "expertly tread the line between the urgent energy of experimental rock and jazz improvisation". Editors at Pitchfork scored this release 7.0 out of 10 and critic Stuart Berman praised the mix of jazz and rock influences that are held together with "a harmonious balance of improvisation and rock-solid composition".

== Track listing ==
1. "Slice" – 3:24
2. "Moon" – 4:43
3. "Grouchy" – 3:30
4. "ATM" – 6:12

== Personnel ==
O.

- Joe Henwood – baritone saxophone
- Tash Keary – drums

Additional personnel

- Dan Carey – production

== See also ==
- 2023 in British music
- List of 2023 albums
