= Chaos for the Fly =

Studio album by Grian Chatten
- Released: 30 June 2023
- Genre: Indie folk; alternative rock
- Length: 36:21
- Label: Partisan
- Producer: Dan Carey; Grian Chatten

Chaos for the Fly is the debut studio album by Irish musician Grian Chatten, best known as the frontman for the post-punk band Fontaines D.C. The album was recorded in two weeks with Fontaines D.C.'s regular producer Dan Carey and features orchestral arrangements. The title is a reference to a quote by Morticia Addams.

== Critical reception ==
Professional ratings
Aggregate scores
Source	Rating
AnyDecentMusic?	8.0/10
Metacritic	83/100
Review scores
Source	Rating
Exclaim!	8/10
Pitchfork	7.6/10

Chaos for the Fly received "universal acclaim" from critics according to review aggregator Metacritic and was assigned a score of 83, based on ten reviews. Uncut felt that "Chatten is able to chase down a succession of personal demons, while broadening his emotional, musical and vocal range", and Mojo remarked that "the self-analysis is elevated by Chatten's scowling poetry and producer Dan Carey's bright detailing".

Ben Cardew of Pitchfork described the album as "a record of rumination, folk instrumentation, and the odd electronic flicker that feels alluringly timeless", with Cardew elaborating that "what really makes the record vibrate, however, is the combination of novelty and tradition, artifice and honesty". Exclaim!'s Stephan Boissonneault stated that "these songs sound as though they could only live on this album, and it would conflict with their energy to have them co-exist in Fontaines D.C.'s repertoire". Boissonneault felt that Chatten's "poetic and stark lyrical imagery has more room to breathe on Chaos for the Fly; the album's instrumentation, while developing over the course of every track, is sparse and spacious".

== Track listing ==
All tracks are written by Grian Chatten.

Chaos for the Fly track listing
No.	Title	Length
1.	"The Score"	2:41
2.	"Last Time Every Time Forever"	3:39
3.	"Fairlies"	4:10
4.	"Bob's Casino"	4:44
5.	"All of the People"	4:23
6.	"East Coast Bed"	4:59
7.	"Salt Throwers off a Truck"	3:26
8.	"I Am So Far"	3:42
9.	"Season for Pain"	3:34
Total length:		36:21

== Personnel ==
- Grian Chatten – vocals, guitars, bass, keyboards, synths, harmonica
- Dan Carey – backing vocals, guitars, bass, keyboards, synths, drum programming
- Tom Coll – drums

== Charts ==
Chart performance for Chaos for the Fly
Chart (2023)	Peak position
Belgian Albums (Ultratop Flanders)	20
Belgian Albums (Ultratop Wallonia)	65
Dutch Albums (Album Top 100)	87
French Albums (SNEP)	113
Irish Albums (IRMA)	9
Scottish Albums (OCC)	3
UK Albums (OCC)	10
UK Independent Albums (OCC)	1
