= Blush (PVA album) =

Studio album by PVA
- Released: 14 October 2022
- Genre: Electropop; futurepop; acid house; post-punk
- Length: 43:04
- Label: Ninja Tune
- Producer: PVA; Ben Romans-Hopcraft; Jamie Neville

PVA chronology
| Toner (2020) | Blush (2022) | No More Like This (2026) |

Singles from Blush
- 1. "Untethered" Released: 24 May 2022; 2. "Hero Man" Released: 19 July 2022; 3. "Bad Dad" Released: 17 August 2022; 4. "Bunker" Released: 13 September 2022

Blush (stylised in BLUSH) is the debut studio album by British band PVA. The album was released on 14 October 2022 through Ninja Tune.

== Critical reception ==
Professional ratings
Review scores
| Source | Rating |
|---|---|
| DIY | 4/5 stars |
| Loud and Quiet | 7/10 |
| NME | 4/5 stars |

El Hunt of NME reviewed, "Where Toner hinted at great ideas, Blush seizes them fully." Cady Siregar of DIY said "Blush is a collection of wonderful and curious songs perfect for soundtracking that 3am dancefloor feeling - or maybe just your nightmares."

| Publication | List | Rank | Ref. |
|---|---|---|---|
| NME | The 25 best debut albums of 2022 | N/A | |
| PopMatters | The Best Electronic Albums of 2022 | N/A | |

== Track listing ==
| No. | Title | Length |
|---|---|---|
| 1. | "Untethered" | 3:36 |
| 2. | "Kim" | 3:54 |
| 3. | "Hero Man" | 3:53 |
| 4. | "Interlude" | 0:48 |
| 5. | "Bunker" | 5:20 |
| 6. | "Comfort Eating" | 3:40 |
| 7. | "The Individual" | 3:50 |
| 8. | "Bad Dad" | 3:40 |
| 9. | "Transit" | 5:49 |
| 10. | "Seven" (featuring Tony Njoku) | 3:45 |
| 11. | "Soap" | 4:49 |
