= A Hero's Death =

Studio album by Fontaines D.C.
- Released: 31 July 2020
- Recorded: December 2019
- Genres: Indie rock; post-punk
- Length: 46:33
- Labels: Partisan; Rough Trade
- Producer: Dan Carey

Fontaines D.C. chronology
Dogrel (2019)	A Hero's Death (2020)	Skinty Fia (2022)

Singles from A Hero's Death
- 1. "A Hero's Death" Released: 5 May 2020; 2. "I Don't Belong" Released: 9 June 2020; 3. "Televised Mind" Released: 30 June 2020; 4. "A Lucid Dream" Released: 15 September 2020

A Hero's Death is the second studio album by Irish post-punk band Fontaines D.C. The album was released on 31 July 2020 through Partisan Records, less than 18 months after the release of their debut album Dogrel. The album received critical acclaim upon its release, signifying a partial departure from their bubbling and anxiety-inducing post-punk sound found on their first record to the incorporation of more dream-like and psychedelic aspects having taken inspiration from The Beach Boys, to name but one of many influences, during the writing of the record.

The album received a nomination for Best Rock Album at the 2021 Grammy Awards, while also garnering the band a nomination for the Brit Award for International Group at the 2021 Brit Awards and Album of the Year at the 2020 Choice Music Prize. It was also nominated for the Best Album Ivor Novello Award in 2021.

After a well-publicised chart battle with American singer Taylor Swift, A Hero's Death debuted at number two in the United Kingdom behind her album Folklore because of a last-minute sales tactic on Swift's part.

== Background and recording ==
Following the release of Dogrel, Fontaines D.C. embarked on a spring 2019 tour with British punk rock band IDLES. This included a North American leg from March to May 2019. Following the North American leg of the tour, the band performed at several European summer music festivals including Glastonbury, Roskilde, Viva, StereoLeto, TRNSMT, Dour, Y Not, Haldern Pop, and Ypsigrock. Following the European summer festival circuit, the band went on a fall 2019 North American tour as the headlining act. The band finishing touring for Dogrel with a headlining tour across Europe, concluding in February 2020.

During the tour, the band wrote and recorded material for their second studio album. The album is produced by Dan Carey, who produced their debut album, Dogrel. On 5 May 2020, the band released the single "A Hero's Death" with a corresponding music video. With the release of the single, the band announced the release of the album for 31 July 2020.

According to lead singer Grian Chatten, the album's name was inspired by a line in a play by Irish writer Brendan Behan. Chatten said the album title is "an effort to balance sincerity and insincerity, but more broadly it's about the battle between happiness and depression, and the trust issues that can form tied to both of those feelings". The album cover features a statue of the Irish mythological demigod Cú Chulainn entitled "The Dying Cuchulain" by Oliver Sheppard.

== Music and lyrics ==
According to the band's press release of the new album, the sound ventures away from their post-punk sound. The band said that bands such as Suicide, The Beach Boys, Beach House, These Immortal Souls, The Brian Jonestown Massacre and Broadcast were influential in the sound of the album.

== Singles ==
The first single from A Hero's Death was its title track, which was released on 5 May 2020 alongside the music video. The video was directed by Hugh Mulhern and produced by Aaron McEnaney and Theresa Adebiyi. The music video features a fictional late night show called The Georgie Barnes Show starring a jaded talk show host named Georgie Barnes, (played by Aidan Gillen) whose co-host is a puppet. The series features the talk show host greeting the band prior to them playing a song on the show, but becoming existential when the band seems to show more appreciation to the puppeteer (Bryan Quinn) and the puppet rather than the host.

The album's second single, "I Don't Belong", was released on 9 June 2020. It was followed by "Televised Mind" on 30 June 2020. Conor Deegan III directed the video for "I Don't Belong," while Mulhern returned to direct the "Televised Mind" video.

== Tour ==
The album was released during the worldwide COVID-19 pandemic, delaying any shows prior to and following the release of the album. Originally, the band had a tour in Australia scheduled for November and December 2020, which was postponed, and a tour from March to July 2021 across Europe which was also postponed. Due to little improvement from the pandemic, the tour was delayed from October 2021 to March 2022.

== Critical reception ==
Professional ratings
Aggregate scores
Source	Rating
AnyDecentMusic?	8.0/10
Metacritic	84/100
Review scores
Source	Rating
AllMusic	3.5/5 stars
Clash	9/10
DIY	4.5/5 stars
The Independent	4/5 stars
The Irish Times	4/5 stars
The Line of Best Fit	8.5/10
NME	4/5 stars
Pitchfork	8.1/10
Q	5/5 stars
Rolling Stone	3.5/5 stars

At aggregating website Metacritic, A Hero's Death has received a normalised rating of 84, based on 23 critical reviews, indicating "universal acclaim".

Writing for Pitchfork, Elizabeth Nelson gave the album an 8.1 out of 10, describe A Hero's Death as "heady, funny, and fearless." Nelson summarised the album as "a maudlin and manic triumph, a horror movie shot as comedy, equal parts future-shocked and handcuffed to history." The Guardian writer, Ben Beaumont-Thomas, gave the album a perfect five stars out of five stating that Fontaines D.C. "deliver a difficult but powerful second album full of songwriting that stares life in the face.

A few music critics offered a more mixed view of A Hero's Death. Liam Martin, writing for AllMusic, awarded the album three-and-a-half stars out of five, feeling that their sophomore effort was not up to par with their debut, Dogrel. Martin said "their debut benefited from strong singles and a cohesive locational element to give it strength. Here the singles are not as strong, and the sweaty vibe from the debut is gone, as if someone has switched on the air conditioning." Martin did concede that "their second attempt only falls short of greatness in a relative sense, as there is still plenty to love about the album."

== Commercial performance ==
Early statistics indicated that A Hero's Death was projected to top the UK Albums Chart in its debut week, knocking off Taylor Swift's album Folklore to number three, which had debuted at number one the week prior. However, after the publishing of the midweek chart, which stated that A Hero's Death had outsold Folklore by over 10,000 copies so far in the week, Swift's marketing team chose to release the physical CDs of Folklore three days before its original scheduled date. "It was sort of like a weird sense of being flattered because the idea that a massive corporation is afraid of losing face to a group of lads from Dublin is hilarious to me," Chatten said about the chart battle.

Ultimately, the last-minute sales tactic resulted in A Hero's Death debuting at number two behind Folklore, losing by 3,500 copies. A year later, Chatten said that the band did not want the attention from the chart battle.

The album also debuted at number two in Ireland and number one in Scotland.

== Track listing ==
Track listing and times via Apple Music.

A Hero's Death track listing
No.	Title	Length
1.	"I Don't Belong"	4:31
2.	"Love Is the Main Thing"	3:53
3.	"Televised Mind"	4:10
4.	"A Lucid Dream"	3:53
5.	"You Said"	4:36
6.	"Oh Such a Spring"	2:32
7.	"A Hero's Death"	4:18
8.	"Living in America"	4:56
9.	"I Was Not Born"	3:50
10.	"Sunny"	4:52
11.	"No"	5:08
Total length:		46:33

Japanese edition (bonus track)
No.	Title	Length
12.	"Liberty Belle" (Live)	3:42
Total length:		50:30

== Personnel ==
Fontaines D.C.

- Grian Chatten – lead vocals, tambourine
- Carlos O'Connell – guitar, backing vocals
- Conor Curley – guitar, piano, backing vocals
- Tom Coll – drums, percussion, guitar
- Conor Deegan – bass guitar, guitar, backing vocals

Additional personnel

- Dan Carey – production, mixing

== Charts ==
Chart performance for A Hero's Death
Chart (2020)	Peak position
Australian Albums (ARIA)	26
Austrian Albums (Ö3 Austria)	61
Belgian Albums (Ultratop Flanders)	9
Belgian Albums (Ultratop Wallonia)	8
Dutch Albums (Album Top 100)	12
French Albums (SNEP)	28
German Albums (Offizielle Top 100)	14
Irish Albums (Official Charts)	2
Italian Albums (FIMI)	47
Portuguese Albums (AFP)	37
Scottish Albums (Official Charts)	1
Spanish Albums (PROMUSICAE)	60
Swiss Albums (Schweizer Hitparade)	12
UK Albums (Official Charts)	2
US Heatseekers Albums (Billboard)	2
US Independent Albums (Billboard)	44

Chart (2026)	Peak position
Croatian International Albums (HDU)	14

== Certifications ==
Region	Certification	Certified units/sales
United Kingdom (BPI)	Silver	60,000^{‡}
^{‡} Sales+streaming figures based on certification alone.
