= Hello Memory =

Studio album by Little Daylight
- Released: 15 July 2014
- Recorded: 2013–14
- Genre: Indie pop
- Length: 38:27
- Label: Capitol
- Producer: Little Daylight

Little Daylight chronology
Tunnel Vision (2013)	Hello Memory (2014)

Singles from Hello Memory
- 1. "Overdose" Released: August 2013

Hello Memory is the debut studio album from American alt-pop group Little Daylight. The album was praised by music critics, and debuted at number 20 on the American Heatseekers Album chart. One of the songs on the album, "Overdose," reached number 1 on the Hype Machine chart.

Prior to the release of "Hello Memory," Little Daylight released an EP entitled "Tunnel Vision." Only one song from the EP, "Overdose," was also included on "Hello Memory."

== Writing and recording ==
In 2013, after touring and the success of "Overdose," the members of Little Daylight returned to Brooklyn to work on writing and recording music for "Hello Memory." Guitarist Matthew Lewkowicz recalled that the group's attitude following the success of "Overdose" was, "‘What’s next?’ You have to feed the beast." The group signed to Capitol Records and began work on their debut album. Most of the music was recorded at a carriage house in Brooklyn that they rented, though they later recorded at a recording studio in Greenpoint called "The End." It took about 6 months for them to record the album.

The group was inspired by a variety of musicians while writing songs for the album. They cite Burial, Jon Hopkins, Cashmere Cat, Tom Petty, Paul Simon, Fleetwood Mac, Charli XCX, Bastille, and Haerts as some of their influences. They also said that the album's lyrics were largely influenced by their lives, stating "We’re constantly inspired by the music (and life!) happening around us."

== Critical reception ==
Professional ratings
Review scores
Source	Rating
AllMusic	3.5/5 stars
No Ripcord	8/10

The album garnered highly positive reviews from critics upon its release. Timothy Monger, writing for Allmusic, gave the album 3.5 out of 5 stars, calling the album "a woozy, intimate affair full of bubbling synth pop, chiming guitar, and laid-back charms" that the album showed that the band has "a knack for buoyant pop songwriting with strong melodic hooks." Monger went on to single out "Runaround" and "Mona Lisa" as album highlights. Groundsounds' review was equally positive, saying that the "album is full of synth-pop with substance and does not disappoint."

Joe Marvilli's review for No Rip Cord, an independent music magazine, was also complimentary, stating that "Their warm exhilaration is focused into tight, memorable melodies, built with physical and digital tools," awarding the album 4 out of 5 stars and noting that "over the course of 40 minutes, the Brooklyn trio brings a boundless amount of energy and joy," also writing that "In a just world, 'Overdose' would be the song of the summer"

== Singles and promotion ==
The album spawned one hit single, "Overdose." It was originally included on their Tunnel Vision EP. The song reached number 1 on the Hype Machine chart. An accompanying music video was released on December 3, 2013.

To promote the album, Little Daylight also released music videos for two of the songs on the album, "My Life" and "Mona Lisa." Neither song was never officially released as a single.

== Commercial performance ==
The album debuted at number 20 on the Billboard Heatseekers Albums chart.

== Track listing ==
All songs written by Little Daylight.

Standard edition
No.	Title	Length
1.	"My Life"	2:57
2.	"Overdose"	3:59
3.	"Siren Call"	3:56
4.	"Love Stories"	4:18
5.	"Mona Lisa"	3:34
6.	"Be Long"	4:32
7.	"Nothing to Lose"	3:30
8.	"No One Else But You (featuring Atlas Genius)"	3:20
9.	"Runaround"	4:52
10.	"Never Go Back"	3:29
Total length:		38:27

== Personnel ==
Adapted from Allmusic and Noisey interview.

- Nicole Taylor - vocals, keyboards
- Matthew Lewkowicz - guitar, keyboards
- Eric Zeiler - bass, keyboards

== Charts ==
Chart (2014)	Peak position
US Heatseekers Albums	20
