= Glutton for Punishment (album) =

Studio album by Heartworms
- Released: February 7, 2025
- Studio: Mr. Dan's (Streatham)
- Length: 37:08
- Label: Speedy Wunderground
- Producer: Dan Carey

Heartworms chronology
A Comforting Notion (2023)	Glutton for Punishment (2025)

Singles from Glutton for Punishment
- 1. "Jacked" Released: 11 June 2024

Glutton for Punishment is the debut studio album by the English musician Heartworms. It was released on 7 February 2025 through Speedy Wunderground.

== Background and release ==
Like Heartworms's debut EP A Comforting Notion (2023), Glutton for Punishment was produced by Dan Carey. The song "Jacked" was released as a single on 11 June 2024. Glutton for Punishment was released through Speedy Wunderground on 7 February 2025.

== Critical reception ==
Professional ratings
Aggregate scores
Source	Rating
AnyDecentMusic?	8.3/10
Metacritic	91/100
Review scores
Source	Rating
Beats Per Minute	75%
Clash	8/10
DIY	5/5 stars
The Line of Best Fit	7/10
Mojo	4/5 stars
musicOMH	4.5/5 stars
NME	5/5 stars
PopMatters	10/10
Under the Radar	9/10

According to the review aggregator Metacritic, Glutton for Punishment received "universal acclaim" based on a weighted average score of 91 out of 100 from 10 critic scores. In a positive review, NME's Alex Rigotti called the album "laser-focused and completely thrilling". John Amen of Beats Per Minute wrote, "Jojo Orme ... alternately plays the cyberpunk priestess, the shambolic diva, and the pop provocateur". He concluded, "Could Glutton For Punishment have been more strategically curated? Perhaps, but this is an ambitious act. And sometimes you need to be commended for what you attempt as much as for what you achieve". Glutton for Punishment also received positive reviews from Under the Radar, DIY, Clash, and MusicOMH.

== Track listing ==
All tracks are written by Josephine Orme.

Glutton for Punishment track listing
No.	Title	Length
1.	"In the Beginning"	0:41
2.	"Just to Ask a Dance"	4:37
3.	"Jacked"	4:27
4.	"Mad Catch"	3:10
5.	"Extraordinary Wings"	5:06
6.	"Warplane"	5:31
7.	"Celebrate"	4:14
8.	"Smugglers Adventure"	6:39
9.	"Glutton for Punishment"	2:38
Total length:		37:08

== Personnel ==
Credits adapted from the album's liner notes.

- Josephine Orme – vocals, guitar, synthesizer
- Dan Carey – synthesizer, guitar, production, mixing
- Gianluca De Gisi – drums
- Elizabeth Walsh – bass
- Jordan Hamblin – guitar
- Saya Barbaglia – violin, viola
- Jane Carey – choir
- Hannah Craft – choir
- Annabel Cullen – choir
- Courtney Gent – choir
- Rhona Graham – choir
- Mina Wood – choir
- Jane Wroe Wright – choir
- Alexis Smith – engineering
- Jason Mitchell – mastering
- Tony Jacobs – cover image
- Blackstar Agency – physical design

== Charts ==
Chart performance for Glutton for Punishment
Chart (2025)	Peak position
Scottish Albums (Official Charts)	24
UK Independent Albums (Official Charts)	9
