= WeirdOs =

Studio album by O.
- Released: 21 June 2024
- Length: 38:18
- Language: English
- Label: Speedy Wunderground
- Producer: Dan Carey

O. chronology
Slice (2023)	WeirdOs (2024)

WeirdOs is the debut full-length studio album by British band O. It has received positive reviews from critics.

== Reception ==
Editors at AllMusic rated this album 4.5 out of 5 stars, with critic Heather Phares writing this music shows the band "stripping experimental rock to its most brazen, fiery essence" and that it results in "a lot of invigorating fun for anyone who loves music that's as unpretentious as it is inventive". BrooklynVegan's Bill Pearis wrote that this release "sounds more like it was made by a full band and not just baritone saxophonist Joe Henwood and drummer Tash Keary" and that it manages to "incorporate... everything from doom metal and blast beats to jungle breakbeats and free jazz freakouts". The site listed it among the best albums of the month, where Pearis praised how "amazingly, this record, which incorporates everything from doom metal and blast beats to jungle breakbeats and free jazz freakouts, was recorded primarily by Joe and Tash live to tape". Nick Roseblade of Clash Music gave this release an 8 out of 10, praising the live-to-tape energy on the recording and summing that it "is one of the finest debut albums I've heard in a LONG time". Writing for DIY, Jack Butler-Terry rated WeirdOs 4 out of 5 stars, stating that "jazz, punk, jungle and dance all cavort together with a healthy respect for one another; nothing is snuffed out or overpowered, even when everything seems to be played with incomparable energy and passion" on an album that "drips with irresistible swagger".

Dominic Haley of Loud and Quiet scored this album an 8 out of 10, pointing out the place that saxophone has in popular music and stating that this music includes influences and sounds as varied as SEGA video game soundtracks, Limp Bizkit breakdowns, cosmic jazz, and Black Sabbath. NME's Alex Rigotti gave this album 4 out of 5 stars, noting the band's use of saxophonics to augment Joe Henwood's baritone saxophone, as well as Tash Keary's drumming, which ranges from "ferocious" to a drum and bass style. The staff at Pitchfork shortlisted this as one of the best albums of the week and the editors of the site rated this release a 7.3 out of 10, with critic Ryan Leas calling the recording "a testament to Keary and Henwood's fearlessness and dexterity". Editors at Stereogum chose this as Album of the Week and critic Chris DeVille stating that this release "documents both the power and the versatility" of the band and continuing that it "captures the kind of chemistry and inventiveness that could keep a band vital indefinitely".

== Track listing ==
1. "Intro" – 2:29
2. "176" – 3:31
3. "TV Dinners" – 4:29
4. "Wheezy" – 4:03
5. "Micro" – 3:15
6. "Cosmo" – 5:12
7. "Green Shirt" – 2:08
8. "Whammy" – 5:36
9. "Sugarfish" – 5:27
10. "Slap Juice" – 2:08

== Personnel ==
O.

- Joe Henwood – baritone saxophone
- Tash Keary – drums

Additional personnel

- Dan Carey – production

== See also ==
- 2024 in British music
- List of 2024 albums
