= Little Daylight (band) =

American pop band

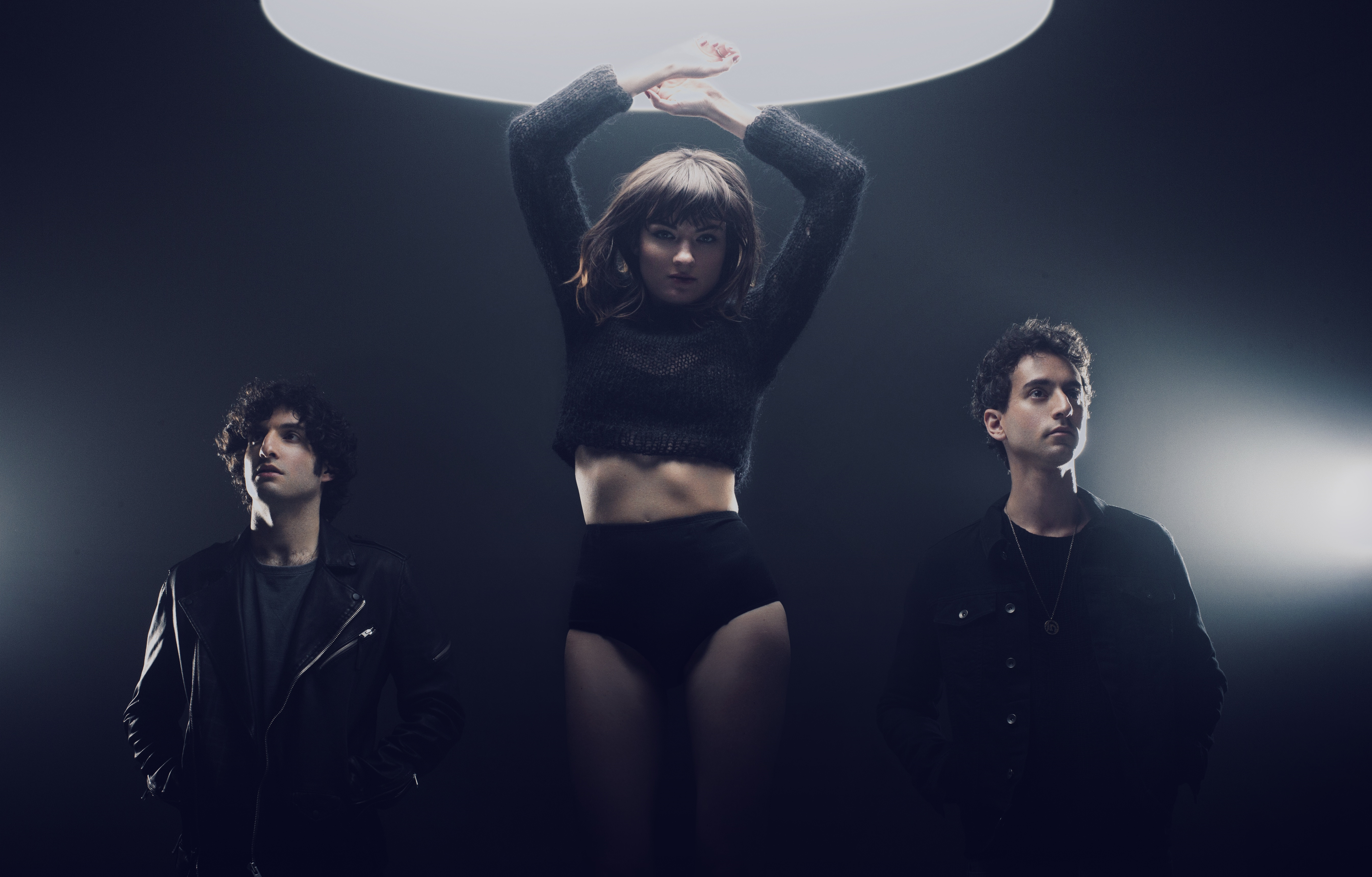

Background information
- Origin: Brooklyn, New York, U.S.
- Genres: Alternative
- Years active: 2012–2016
- Labels: Capitol Records
- Members: Nikki Taylor; Matt Lewkowicz; Eric Zeiler
- Website: littledaylight.com

Little Daylight was an American alternative pop group from Brooklyn, New York.

== History ==
Little Daylight was formed in the spring of 2012 by Nikki Taylor, Matt Lewkowicz, and Eric Zeiler. All three stayed at a friend's lake house and began working on remixes of songs from various artists such as the Neighbourhood, Passion Pit, Freelance Whales, and Edward Sharpe & the Magnetic Zeros. The group took its name from the 1871 fairy tale Little Daylight written by George MacDonald and began their career by performing the remixes and their own material they penned while at the lake house.

Little Daylight's live performance debut came at SXSW in 2013. In order to not feel pressure of performing in front of a large crowd for the first time, the band made up a fake name and bio for the band. They signed with Capitol Records a short time later. Little Daylight released their first EP in 2013. Titled Tunnel Vision, the EP contained the single "Overdose" which went to #1 on The Hype Machine. The video for the song was filmed in the streets of Manhattan, after the borough was left without power after Hurricane Sandy. After the EP release, the band toured with acts such as Charli XCX and Bastille while at the same time working on new material for a studio album. They made their first national television appearance in May 2014 on Late Night with Seth Meyers.

Hello Memory was the first album from Little Daylight. It was self-produced entirely by the band members, all three of whom shared producing and songwriting duties. Part of the album was recorded in a carriage house in Brooklyn, New York that the band outfitted with equipment the band had used over the years, finishing the recording in a studio located in Greenpoint, Brooklyn. Hello Memory was released on 15 July 2014. It debuted at number 20 on the Billboard Heatseekers Albums chart.

In 2016, two of Little Daylight's band members formed the Brooklyn duo Me Not You. Little Daylight's Facebook account now redirects to the new band.

== Discography ==
=== Studio albums ===
Year	Album details
2014	Hello Memory: Released: July 15, 2014; Label: Capitol; Formats: CD, vinyl, streaming

=== Extended plays ===
Year	Album details
2013	Tunnel Vision: Released: August 13, 2013; Label: Capitol; Formats: CD, vinyl, streaming, FLAC

=== Singles ===
Year	Title	Album
2013	"Overdose"	Tunnel Vision EP
