= Ypsigrock =

Italian contemporary music festival

Ypsigrock Festival
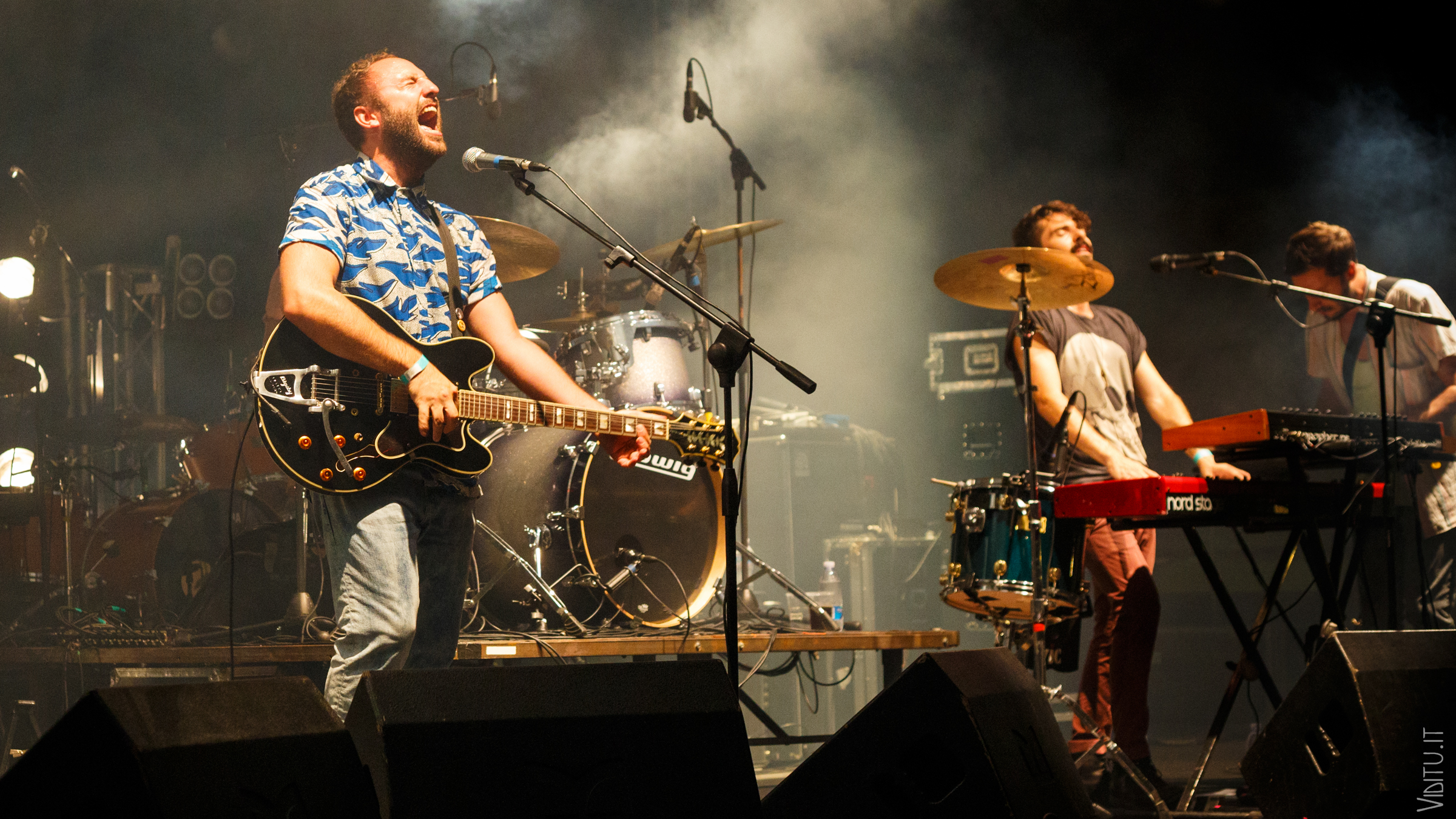
- Local Natives performing at Ypsigrock in August 2013
- Dates: Within the first two weeks of August (currently)
- Locations: Castelbuono, Italy
- Years active: 1997–present
- Website: www.ypsigrock.it/en/

Ypsigrock is a contemporary music festival held annually in August in the city of Castelbuono, Italy. Castelbuono is located in the Sicilian province of Palermo. The festival is organized by the Glenn Gould Association. Since 1997, the festival has taken place in Castelbuono's main square. The festival is now in its twenty-first consecutive year and was awarded as Best Italian Festival at the 2015 On Stage Awards 2015.
