= Dogrel =

Studio album by Fontaines D.C.
- Released: 12 April 2019
- Genre: Post-punk revival
- Length: 39:48
- Label: Partisan
- Producer: Dan Carey

Fontaines D.C. chronology
Dogrel (2019)	A Hero's Death (2020)

Singles from Dogrel
- 1. "Too Real" Released: 12 November 2018; 2. "Big" Released: 7 February 2019; 3. "Roy's Tune" Released: 6 March 2019; 4. "Boys in the Better Land" Released: 10 April 2019

Dogrel is the debut studio album by Dublin-based post-punk band Fontaines D.C. It was released through Partisan Records on 12 April 2019 on cassette, CD, digital download, and vinyl formats. The album was nominated for Album of The Year at the Choice Music Prize and Mercury Prize in 2019.

== Critical reception ==
Professional ratings
Aggregate scores
Source	Rating
AnyDecentMusic?	8.5/10
Metacritic	86/100
Review scores
Source	Rating
AllMusic	4/5 stars
Clash	9/10
DIY	4.5/5 stars
The Guardian	5/5 stars
The Irish Times	4/5 stars
Mojo	4/5 stars
NME	5/5 stars
Pitchfork	8.0/10
Q	4/5 stars
Uncut	6/10

Upon its release, Dogrel received universal acclaim from contemporary music critics. On review aggregator website Metacritic, Dogrel has an average weighted rating of 86 out of 100 indicating "universal acclaim" based on 17 critics' reviews. On review aggregator website AnyDecentMusic?, the album has an average rating of 8.5 out of 10.

Ben Beaumont-Thomas, writing for The Guardian, praised the lyricism of the album, stating that "this is the kind of songwriting quality that bands can take years to reach, or never reach at all: brilliant, top to bottom." Tom Connock of NME stated that "the Irish troubadours come good on a debut album that offers both a storyteller's narrative voice and a snarling new vision of youthful disillusionment." Writing for The Skinny, Robin Murray praised the multitude of emotions the album evokes, saying that it "feels both overwhelming and tender, caustic and soothing, a blast of working class rage grown articulate while retaining its primal howl."

Writing for Pitchfork, Stuart Berman contrasted both the band and record to contemporary British post-punk outfits, IDLES and Shame, saying that "Fontaines D.C. are fueled by neither IDLES' revolutionary fervor nor Shame's festering disgust. They're not raging against the current state of affairs as much as lamenting the local communities and culture in danger of being steamrolled by the march of modernity." He went on to comment that "their origin story is so quaint and anachronistic, it verges on flaneur cosplay, with the quintet reportedly bonding over a mutual love of Joycean poetry and pub nights spent scribbling out and reciting verses to one another. That old-school approach finds its analog in a raw, robust twin-guitar attack that's more jangly than jagged, nodding to ‘60s garage, surf, and early rock‘n’roll while projecting a confrontational fury. As such, Fontaines D.C. are very much a post-punk band reclaiming a certain pre-punk innocence."

The album was nominated for the 2019 Mercury Prize and the Choice Music Prize.

== Track listing ==
All tracks are written and performed by Fontaines D.C.

No.	Title	Length
1.	"Big"	1:45
2.	"Sha Sha Sha"	2:30
3.	"Too Real"	4:08
4.	"Television Screens"	4:00
5.	"Hurricane Laughter"	4:50
6.	"Roy's Tune"	3:00
7.	"The Lotts"	4:56
8.	"Chequeless Reckless"	2:15
9.	"Liberty Belle"	2:32
10.	"Boys in the Better Land"	5:00
11.	"Dublin City Sky"	4:52
Total length:		39:48

== Personnel ==
Credits adapted from the liner notes of Dogrel.

Fontaines D.C.

- Grian Chatten – vocals (1–11), tambourine (1–11)
- Carlos O'Connell – guitar (1–11), baritone guitar (1), piano (3), Buchla Music Easel (5), backing vocals (9)
- Conor Curley – guitar (1–11), baritone guitar (8, 10), Nashville guitar (4), chord organ (5), backing vocals (8, 9)
- Tom Coll – drums (1–11), tambourine (8, 10), miscellaneous percussion (2)
- Conor Deegan – bass guitar (1–11), piano (4), baritone guitar (5), surf guitar (8), Jupiter synth (7), backing vocals (8)

Additional personnel

- Dan Carey – production, mixing, swarmatron (3, 5, 7), arpeggiator (7)
- Alexis Smith – engineering
- Christina Wright – mastering

Artwork

- Bruce Davidson – photography (cover)
- Richard Dumas – photography (inner sleeve)
- Matt de Jong – design

== Charts ==
Chart (2019)	Peak position
Belgian Albums (Ultratop Flanders)	88
Belgian Albums (Ultratop Wallonia)	163
Dutch Albums (Album Top 100)	93
French Albums (SNEP)	75
German Albums (Offizielle Top 100)	92
Irish Albums (IRMA)	4
Scottish Albums (Official Charts)	4
UK Albums (Official Charts)	9

Chart (2026)	Peak position
Croatian International Albums (HDU)	9

== Certifications ==
Region	Certification	Certified units/sales
United Kingdom (BPI)	Gold	100,000^{‡}
^{‡} Sales+streaming figures based on certification alone.

== Release history ==
Region	Date	Format
Various	12 April 2019	Cassette, CD, digital download, vinyl
United States	26 April 2019	CD, vinyl
