= Dan Carey (music producer) =

English record producer, songwriter, mixer and remixer

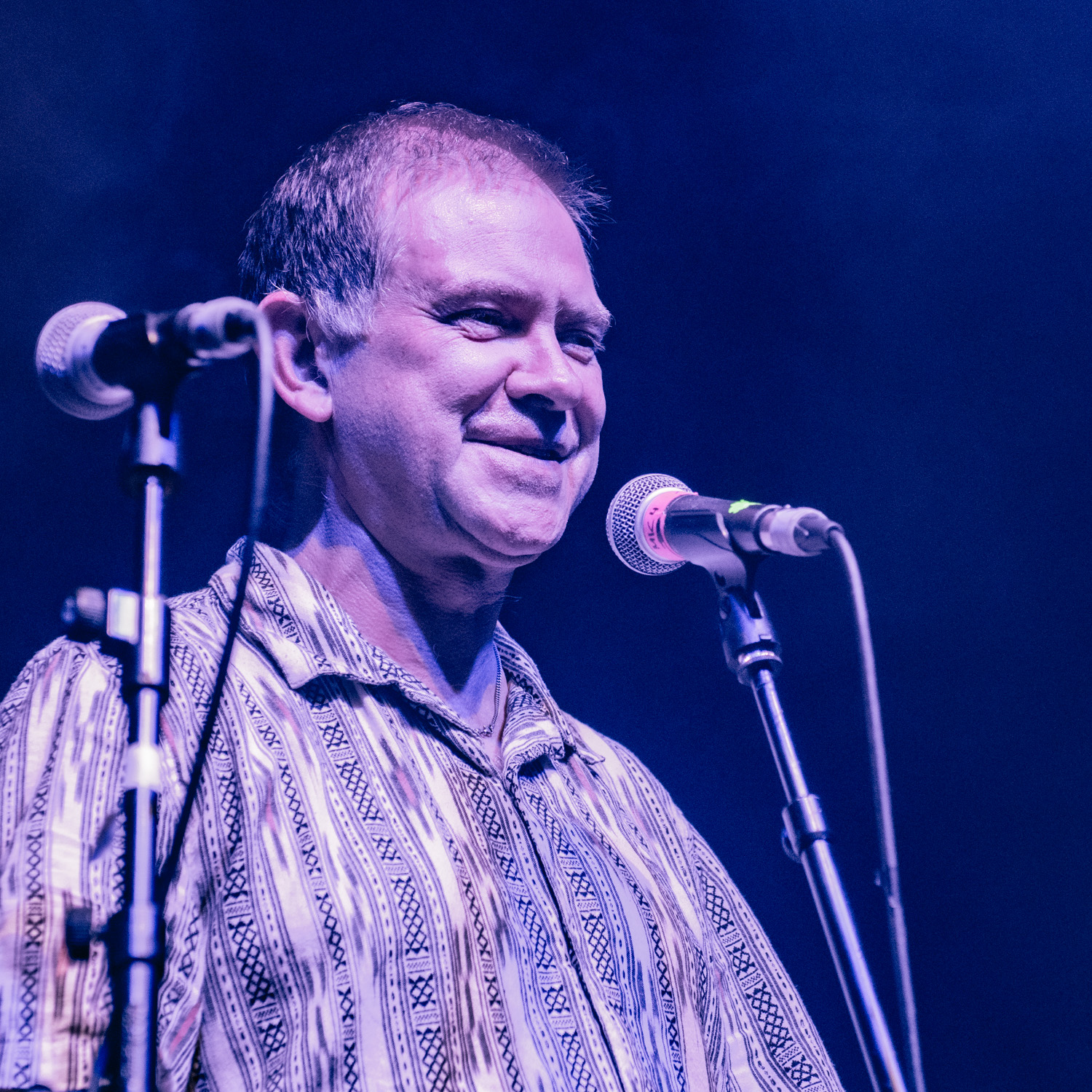
- Carey in September 2023

Background information
- Born: Daniel De Mussenden Carey; 24 December 1969 (age 56); Islington, London, England
- Occupations: Record producer; songwriter; mixer; engineer
- Label: Speedy Wunderground
- Website: www.speedywunderground.com

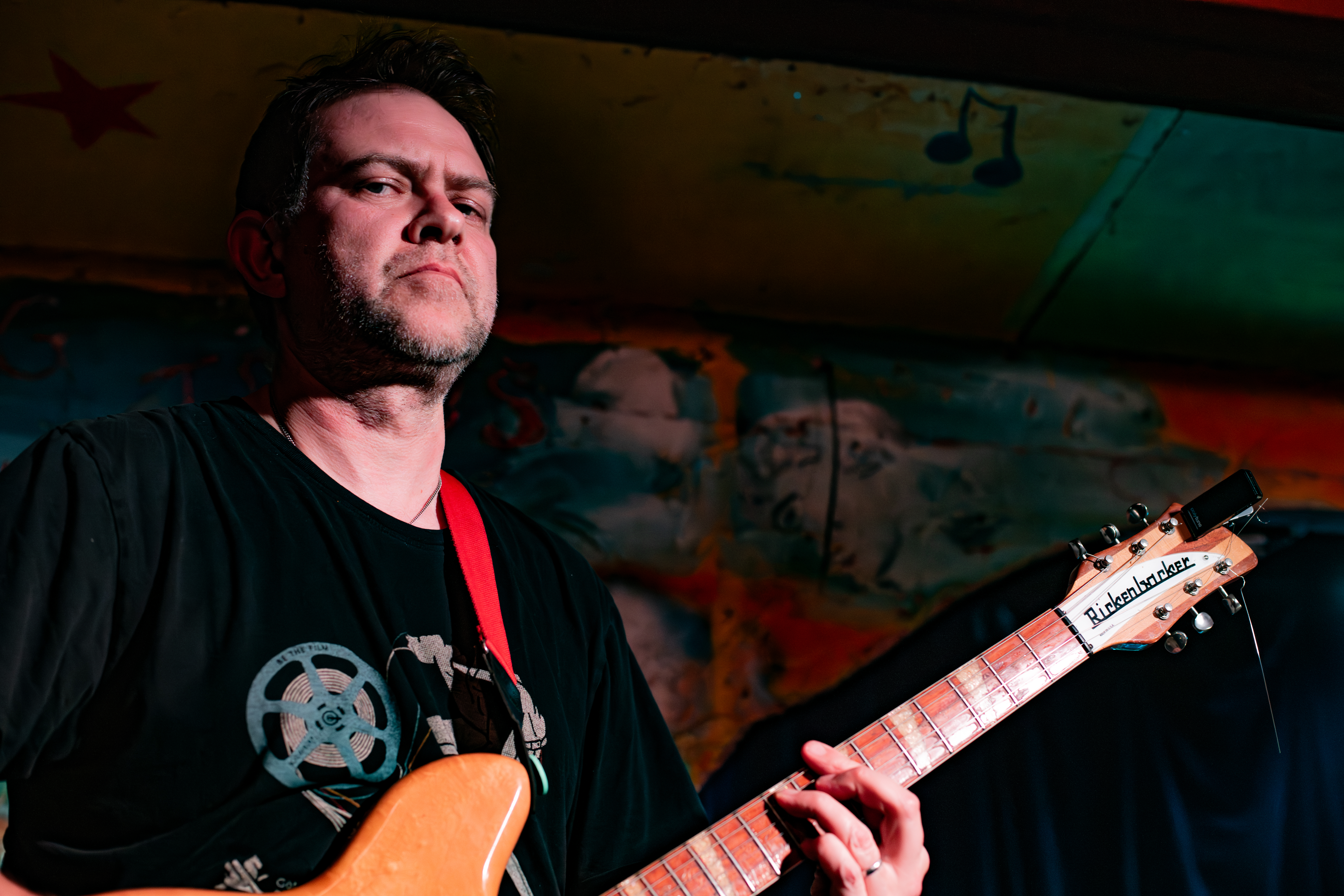

Daniel De Mussenden Carey (born 24 December 1969) is an English record producer, songwriter, mixer and remixer. He owns his own studio in South London and runs the record label Speedy Wunderground. His production work for Speedy Wunderground bands such as Black Country, New Road, Black Midi, and Squid was instrumental in the creation of the Windmill scene, also known as the "Speedy scene".

In 2014, Carey received two Mercury Prize nominations for his production work on two nominated albums: Everybody Down by Kae Tempest and First Mind by Nick Mulvey. In 2019, Carey earned two further Mercury Prize nominations for his production work on the albums Schlagenheim by Black Midi and Dogrel by Fontaines D.C.. He earned a fifth nomination in 2025 for Jacob Alon's In Limerence.

Carey produced and played synthesizer on the self-titled debut album by the British band Wet Leg. Carey previously produced for the London-based labels Dust Records, Dust2Dust and DMI. He was also one half of the group Danmass, which released music on all three labels and Skint Records. Danmass released one album, Formfreaks, on Dust2Dust in 1999.

== Discography ==
Dan Carey album credits
Artist	Release	Year	Record Label	Credit
Kneecap	Fenian	2026	Heavenly	Production
Jacob Alon	In Limerence	2025	Island Records	Production, mixing
Heartworms	Glutton for Punishment	2025	Speedy Wunderground	Production
Moreish Idols	All In The Game	2025	Speedy Wunderground	Production
Been Stellar	Scream from New York, NY	2024	Dirty Hit	Production
O.	WeirdOs	2024	Speedy Wunderground	Production
O.	Slice	2023	Speedy Wunderground	Production
Grian Chatten	Chaos for the Fly	2023	Partisan	Production
Squid	O Monolith	2023	Warp	Production
Slowthai	Ugly	2023	Method/Interscope	Production, writing
The Lounge Society	Tired of Liberty	2022	Speedy Wunderground	Production, mixing
Moreish Idols	Float (EP)	2022	Speedy Wunderground	Production, mixing
O.	"OGO" – single	2022	Speedy Wunderground	Production
Joyeria	FIM	2022	Speedy Wunderground	Production, Mixing
Foals	Life Is Yours	2022	Warner/ADA	Production
Sinead O'Brien	Time Bend and Break The Bower	2022	Chess Club Records	Production, mixing
Honeyglaze	Honeyglaze	2022	Speedy Wunderground	Production, mixing
Wet Leg	Wet Leg	2022	Domino	Production
Fontaines D.C.	Skinty Fia	2022	Partisan, Rough Trade	Production
Geese	Projector	2021	Partisan	Production
Goat Girl	On All Fours	2021	Rough Trade	Production
Squid	Bright Green Field	2021	Warp Records	Production, mixing
Chubby and the Gang	The Mutt's Nuts	2021	Partisan Records	Mixing
The Lounge Society	"Burn the Heather" – single	2020	Speedy Wunderground	Production, mixing
PVA	"Talks" – single	2020	Big Dada	Production, mixing
DEWEY	"Is It Infatuation?" – single from Sóller, Pt. One	2020		Production
DEWEY	"Savannah"- single from Sóller, Pt. One	2020	Speedy Wunderground	Production, mixing
Squid	"Sludge" – single	2020	Big Dada	Production, mixing
La Roux	Supervision	2020	Supercolour	Production, mixing
Grimes	"New Gods" from Miss Anthropocene	2020	4AD	Mixing
Fontaines D.C.	A Hero's Death	2020	Partisan	Production, mixing
Tiña	Positive Mental Health Music	2020	Speedy Wunderground	Produce / Mix
Caroline Polachek	"Go as a Dream", "I Give Up" from PANG	2019	Perpetual Novice	Co-produce
Warmduscher	Tainted Lunch	2019	The Leaf Label	Produce / Mix
Fontaines D.C.	Dogrel	2019	Partisan	Produce / Mix
Black Midi	Schlagenheim	2019	Rough Trade	Produce / Mix
Squid	Town Centre	2019	Speedy Wunderground	Produce / Mix
Sophie Hunger	Molecules	2018	Two Gentlemen	Produce / Mix
Nick Mulvey	Wake Up Now		Fiction	Produce / Mix
Kaleida	Meter [Mr Dan Remix]		Lex	Remixer
Azusena	Red Sky		Fiction	Produce / Mix
Pumarosa	The Witch		Fiction	Produce / Mix
DEWEY	Loche Linnhe		Speedy Wunderground	Produce / Mix
Azusena	Better, “Crosby”		Fiction	Produce / Mix
JW Ridley	Everything (Deathless)		Speedy Wunderground	Produce / Mix
Pixx	I Bow Down		4AD	Produce / Writer
Kae Tempest	Let Them Eat Chaos		Fiction	Produce / Writer/ Mixer
Boxed In	Melt		Nettwerk	Produce / Mix
Bat for Lashes	Sunday Love		The Echo Label	Produce / Writer
Speedy Wunderground	Speedy Wunderground Year 2		Manata	Producer/ Mixer
Pumarosa	Pumarosa EP		Fiction	Produce / Mix
FEWS	Means		PIAS	Produce / Mix
All We Are	All We Are		Domino	Produce / Mix
Bat for Lashes	"Plan the Escape"		Republic	Mix
JUCE!	"Burnin' Up," "Call You Out," "The Heat"		Island	Produce / Mix
Childhood	Lacuna		Marathon	Produce / Mix
Boxed In	"Run Quicker"		Nettwerk	Produce / Mix
Eugene McGuinness	Chroma		Domino	Produce / Mix
Speedy Wunderground	Speedy Wunderground – Year 1		Manata	Produce / Mix / Engineer
Kae Tempest	Everybody Down		Big Dada	Produce / Mix
Nick Mulvey	First Mind		Fiction	Produce / Mix
All We Are	"Feel Safe"		Domino	Produce / Mix
Joel Compass	"Forgive Me"		Outsiders/Polydor	Produce / Mix
Toy	Join the Dots		Heavenly	Produce / Mix
Oh Land	Wish Bone		Federal Prism	Produce / Mix
Emiliana Torrini	Tookah		Rough Trade	Produce / Mix / Engineer
Little Daylight	"Name In Lights"		Capitol	Mix
Bloc Party	"Ratchet," "Obscene"		Frenchkiss	Produce / Mix
Steve Mason	Monkey's Mind in the Devil's Time		Domino	Produce / Mix / Engineer
Laura Welsh	"Unravel"		Polydor	Mix
Bat for Lashes	The Haunted Man		EMI	Produce / Mix
Yeasayer	Fragrant World		We Are Free	Mix
Toy	Toy		Heavenly	Produce / Mix
Willy Mason	Carry On		Fiction	Produce / Mix
Mystery Jets	Radlands		Rough Trade	Produce / Mix
Civil Twilight	Holy Weather		Wind-up	Produce / Mix
Eugene McGuinness	"Shotgun", "Harlequin", "Japanese Cars", "Video Games" and "Sugarplum"		Domino	Co-Produce / Mix
Lianne La Havas	"Night School", "Age" and "Empty"		Warner Records	Produce / Mix
Django Django	"Default"		Because	Produce / Mix
Chairlift	Something		Columbia	Co-Produce / Mix
Theophilus London	Timez Are Weird These Days		Warner Bros.	Mix
The Kills	Blood Pressures		Domino	Co-Produce / Engineer
Tame Impala	"Expectation"		Modular	Mix
Alice Gold	Seven Rainbows		Fiction/Polydor	Produce / Mix / Engineer
Oh Land	"Wolf and I", "Twist"	2011	Epic	Produce / Mix
Oh Land	"Perfection", "Lean", "Voodoo"	2011	Epic	Produce / Co-write / Mix
I Blame Coco	"No Smile", "Playwright Fate", "The Constant"		Island	Produce / Mix / Engineer
TT	LoveLaws	2018	LoveLeaks	Produce / Perform
Franz Ferdinand	Blood	2009	Domino	Produce / Mix
Hot Chip	One Life Stand	2010	EMI	Mix
La Roux	"Quicksand"	2009	Polydor/Interscope	Mix
CocknBullKid	"Boys and Girls"		Island/IAMSOUND	Additional production / Mix
Emiliana Torrini	Me and Armini	2008	Rough Trade	Produce / Co-write / Mix
Franz Ferdinand	Tonight: Franz Ferdinand	2009	Domino	Produce / Mix
Hot Chip	Made in the Dark	2008	EMI	Mix
CSS	"Let's Make Love & Listen to Death From Above"		Sub Pop	Remix
CSS	"Music Is My Hot Hot Sex"		Sub Pop	Mix
Mr Hudson	"Too Late, Too Late"		Mercury	Produce / Mix / Engineer
Brazilian Girls	"Pussy Pussy Pussy Marijuana"		Verve	Mix / Remix
Lily Allen	"Cheryl Tweedy"		EMI / Regal	Produce / Cowrite
Sia	"Breathe Me", "Little Black Sandals", "Academia", "Pictures"		Go-Beat	Produce / Co-write
Kylie Minogue	"Slow"		EMI	Produce / Co-write
Fatboy Slim	"The Joker"	2004	Skint	Remix
Sia	"The Fight"	2010	Monkey Puzzle	Co-write
Ted Zed	"I Don't Mind"		One Fifteen	Mix
Emiliana Torrini	Fisherman's Woman	2005	Rough Trade	Produce / Co-write / Mix
Danmass	Formfreaks	1999	Dust2Dust	Produce / Co-write / Mix
