= PVA (band) =

English rock band

- Origin: South London, England
- Genres: Dance-punk; futurepop; post-punk; darkwave
- Years active: 2017–present
- Labels: Ninja Tune; Speedy Wunderground
- Members: Ella Harris; Josh Baxter; Louis Satchell
- Website: www.pva.band

PVA is an English music band formed in South London in 2017, consisting of Ella Harris, Josh Baxter and Louis Satchell.

== Career ==
The band was formed in 2017 after Ella Harris and Josh Baxter met at a house party and discovered that they had common musical interests. Within a few weeks of deciding on this, they played their first show at a pub that Harris worked in. Their first band name was PVA Presents, after which they shortened their name to PVA. Louis Satchell joined the band in December 2018, on drums. They performed at The Windmill, Brixton and several venues in London. In the same year, they supported bands such as Squid, Goat Girl, Shame, Audiobooks and Black Midi. After seeing their set at Green Man, they connected with Dan Carey. On his label, Speedy Wunderground, the band released their debut single Divine Intervention, at the end of 2019.

In 2020, their performances at SXSW and tour of Japan, alongside various support slots, were cancelled due to the COVID-19 pandemic. They signed to Ninja Tune in the summer of 2020 and released EP Toner on 20 November. The EP consisted of three tracks and three remixes, including remixes by Daniel Fox of Gilla Band and Lynks. The remix version by Mura Masa from their song Talks was nominated for Grammy Best Remixed Recording.

Their debut studio album Blush was released on 14 October 2022. The band have also remixed tracks from Caroline Polachek, Goat Girl and Shame. A live performance on KEXP featuring several tracks from Blush was published on 4 January 2024.

The band's second studio album, No More Like This, was released on 23 January 2026. The LP, produced by Kwake Bass, consisted of ten tracks, featuring three singles Boyface, Send and Peel. The band toured across Europe following its release, with one full live performance in Paris filmed and published on REVOLUTION 9 on 2 April 2026 featuring live interpretations of the new album. The release of A Dream Like This, an EP including six alternative versions of the sophomore album's tracks each labelled as "Dream Editions", was announced in August 2026.

== Members ==
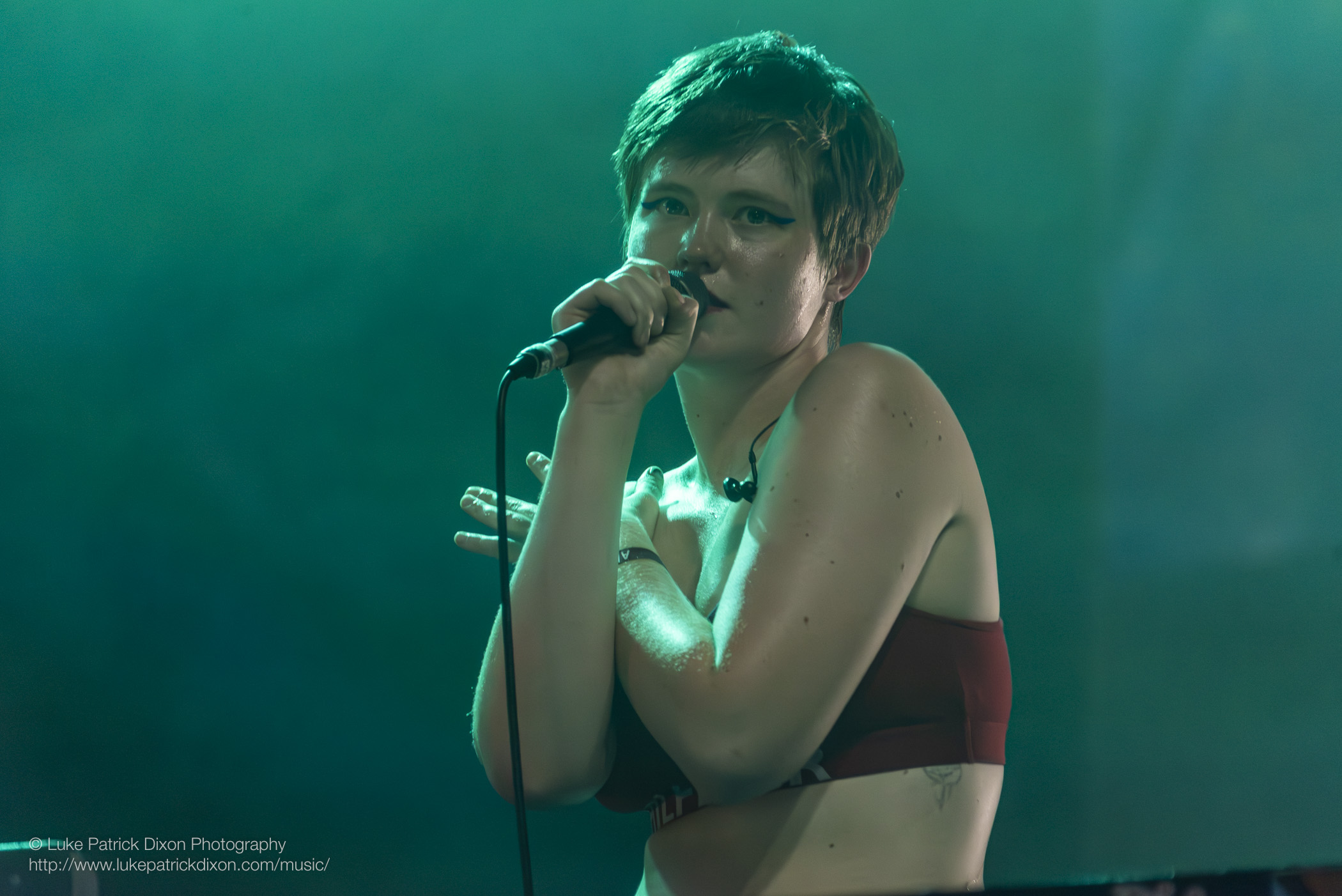
Ella Harris of PVA performing at End of the Road, Dorset, England 2 September 2023

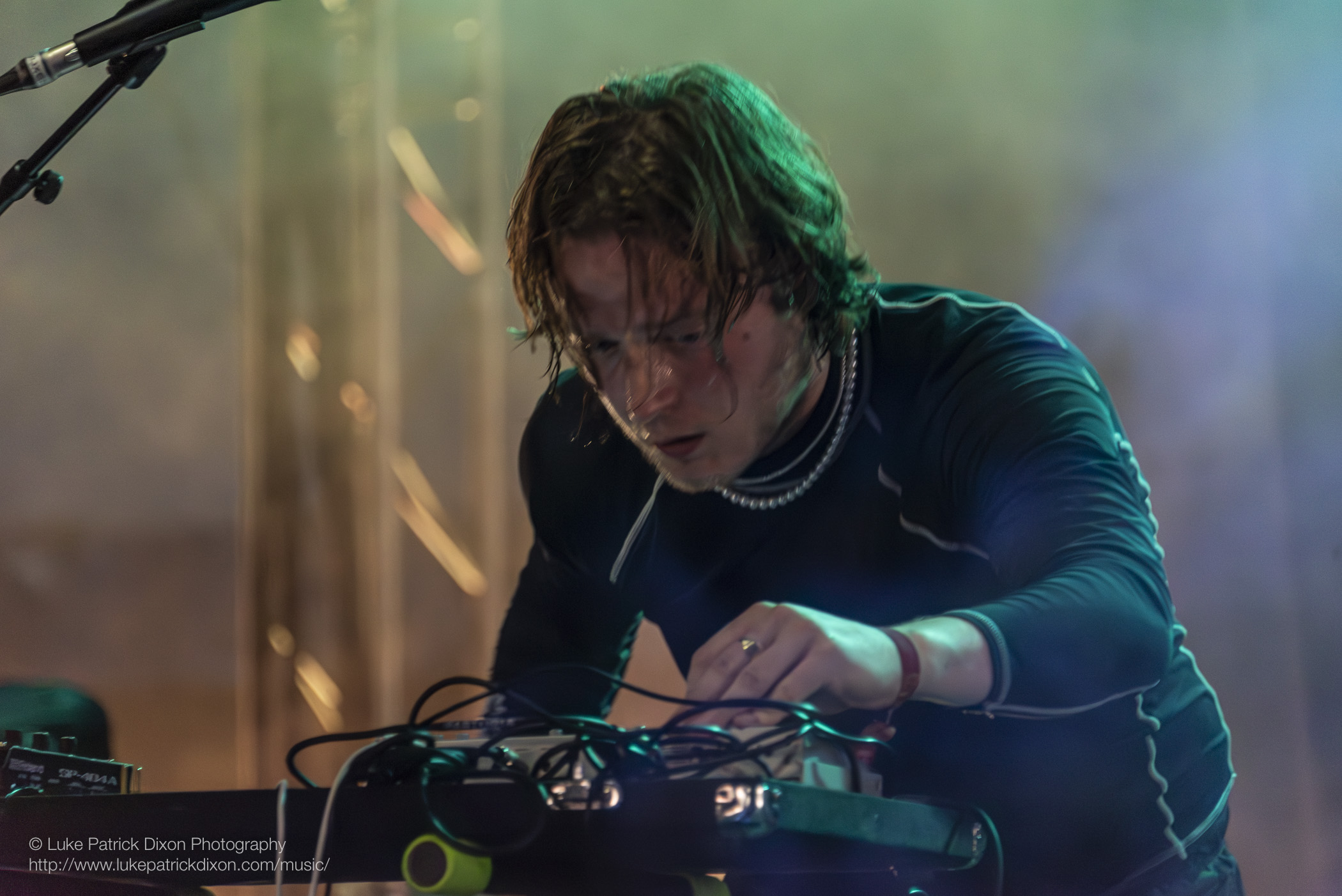
Josh Baxter of PVA performing at End of the Road, Dorset, England 2 September 2023

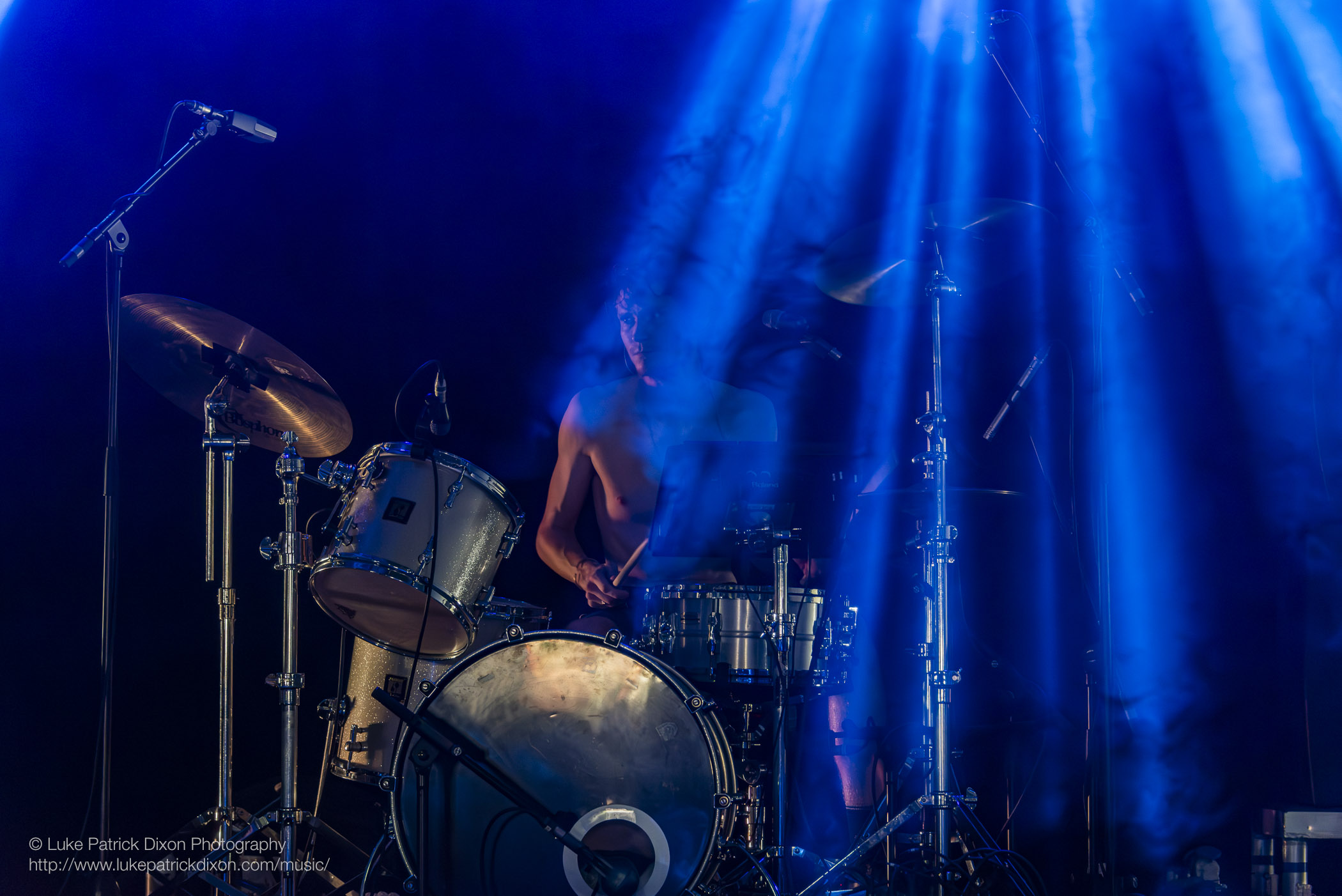
Louis Satchell of PVA performing at End of the Road, Dorset, England 2 September 2023

- Ella Harris – vocals, keyboards, percussion
- Josh Baxter – keyboards, vocals
- Louis Satchell – drums

== Discography ==
=== Studio albums ===
- Blush (2022)
- No More Like This (2026)

=== EPs ===
- Toner (2020)
