= Grian Chatten =

Irish musician (born 1995)

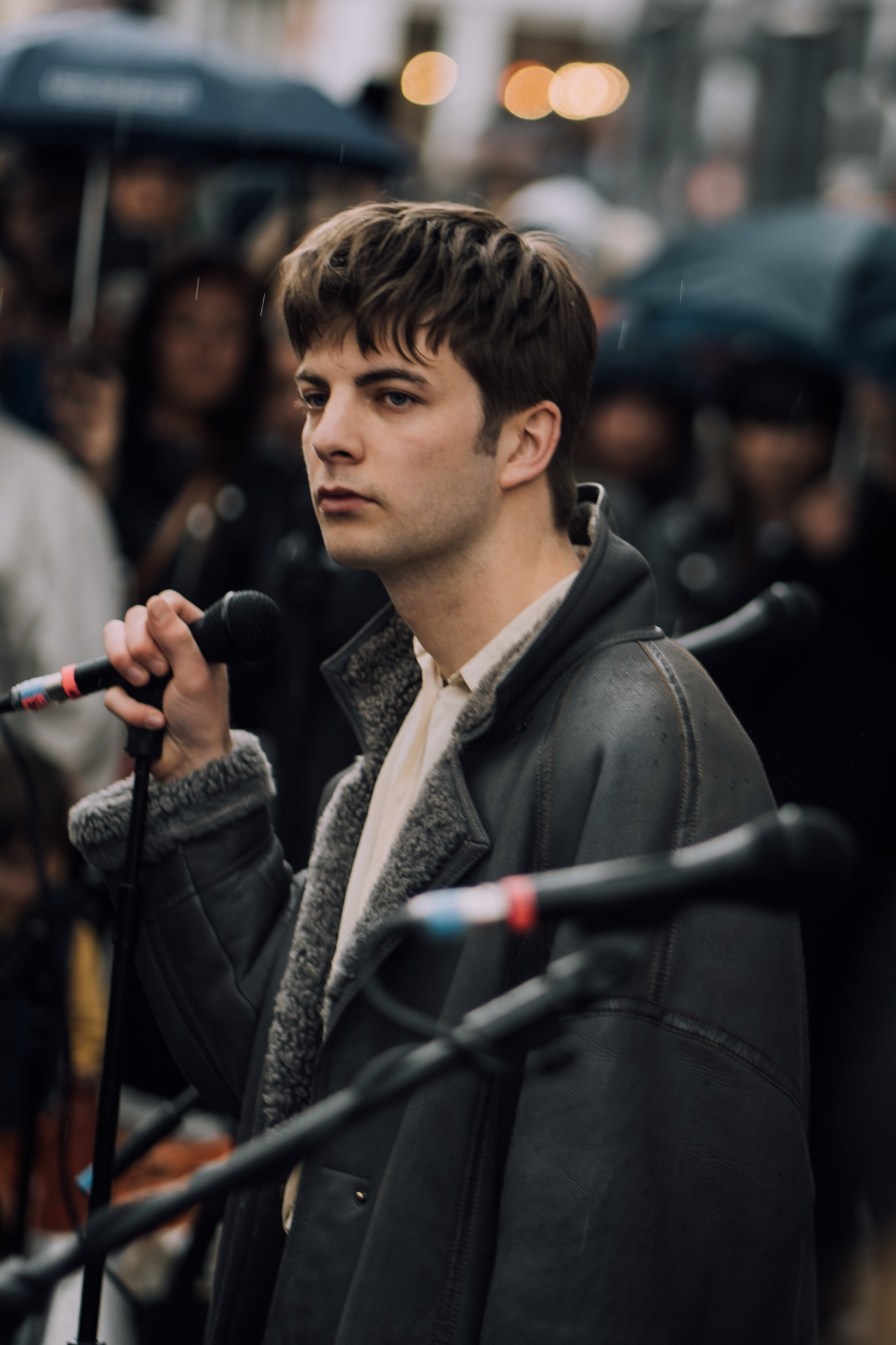
- Chatten performing with Fontaines D.C. in 2019

Background information
- Born: 19 July 1995 (age 31); Barrow-in-Furness, Cumbria, England
- Origin: Dublin, Ireland
- Genres: Post-punk; alternative rock; folk rock
- Occupations: Singer; songwriter
- Instruments: Vocals; percussion; accordion; guitar
- Years active: 2017–present
- Label: Partisan
- Member of: Fontaines D.C.
- Website: grianchatten.com

Grian Alexander Chatten (/ˈɡriːən/; born 19 July 1995) is an Irish musician, and the lead singer and lyricist of post-punk band Fontaines D.C.

== Early life ==
Grian Chatten was born in Barrow-in-Furness, England on 19 July 1995 to an English mother and Irish father. The family moved to Ireland when Chatten was a month old and lived a "nomadic lifestyle" before settling in Skerries, County Dublin when he was twelve years old. In his early teenage years, Chatten was the frontman of an emo and pop-punk band called Thumbprint. Chatten moved to The Liberties in Dublin and attended The British and Irish Modern Music Institute, where he met guitarists Conor Curley and Carlos O'Connell, bass player Conor Deegan, and drummer Tom Coll. Along with a passion for music, the group held a shared interest in poetry, and published three pamphlets together. After graduating, they formed the band Fontaines D.C. in 2017.

== Career ==
In 2019, Fontaines D.C. released their debut album Dogrel on Partisan Records. Featuring songs like Roy’s Tune, Liberty Belle, and Boys in the Better Land, the album received widespread critical acclaim, catapulting the band to an international audience. Chatten drew comparisons with post-punk frontmen Ian Curtis and Mark E. Smith for both his intensity and lyrics. The band quickly followed up with 2020's A Hero's Death, another hit with the critics and Chatten's "poetry suffused lyrics" again receiving plaudits. A third album in four years, Skinty Fia was the band's first to not receive a Mercury Prize nomination, though it again was well received by critics.

Chatten launched his solo career with the release of his single "The Score" on 25 April 2023. On 4 May 2023, he released his second single "Fairlies". On 30 June 2023, Chatten released his solo album Chaos for the Fly on Partisan Records. The Irish Times called it "a curveball worth catching" and gave it four stars out of five. The Standard declared it "short but sweet, bleak but beautiful" and awarded it four stars.

Chatten again received praise for both his vocals and lyrics on Fontaines D.C.'s fourth studio album, Romance. The Line of Best Fit stated: "Chatten's voice finds new facets. Falling throughout to dramatic whispered hushes, breathy flourishes, hip-hop flows, and confident highs – the rigorous touring life is paying dividends to his abilities."

== Personal life ==
Chatten currently resides in Brighton with his fiancée, artist manager and writer Georgie Jesson, to whom he became engaged in 2019. His uncle is former England footballer, Gary Stevens. Chatten experienced frequent panic attacks prior to being diagnosed with attention deficit hyperactivity disorder and beginning medication for it.

At the 2026 Reading Festival, Chatten performed Fontaines D.C.'s headline set wearing the away shirt of Welsh semi-professional club Cwmbran Celtic F.C., which is sponsored by the band Mogwai and raises money for the Music Venue Trust. He said he had done so because "Cwmbran Celtic is a club run by volunteers who have a sense of solidarity with the plight independent music venues are facing", and the club reported that pre-sale orders for the shirt almost doubled afterwards.

== Discography ==
=== Albums ===
| Title | Details |
|---|---|
| Chaos for the Fly | Released: 30 June 2023; Label: Partisan; Format: Digital download, streaming, CD, LP |

=== Singles ===
| Title | Year | Album |
|---|---|---|
| "The Score" | 2023 | Chaos for the Fly |
| "Fairlies" | 2023 | Chaos for the Fly |
| "Last Time Every Time Forever" | 2023 | Chaos for the Fly |
| "All of the People" | 2023 | Chaos for the Fly |

=== Other appearances ===
| Year | Song | Artist | Album | Notes |
|---|---|---|---|---|
| 2022 | "I Saw Light" | Kae Tempest | The Line Is a Curve | Also provided backing vocals on the song "Move" |
| 2022 | "Full Way Round" | Leftfield | This Is What We Do | |
| 2023 | "Ugly" | Slowthai | Ugly | Backing vocals |
| 2023 | "Better Way to Live" | Kneecap | Fine Art | |
| 2024 | "Stranger" | Hinds | Viva Hinds | |
| 2026 | "Flags" | Damon Albarn, Kae Tempest | Help(2) | as part of a charity album for War Child |
