= Fontaines D.C. =

Irish rock band

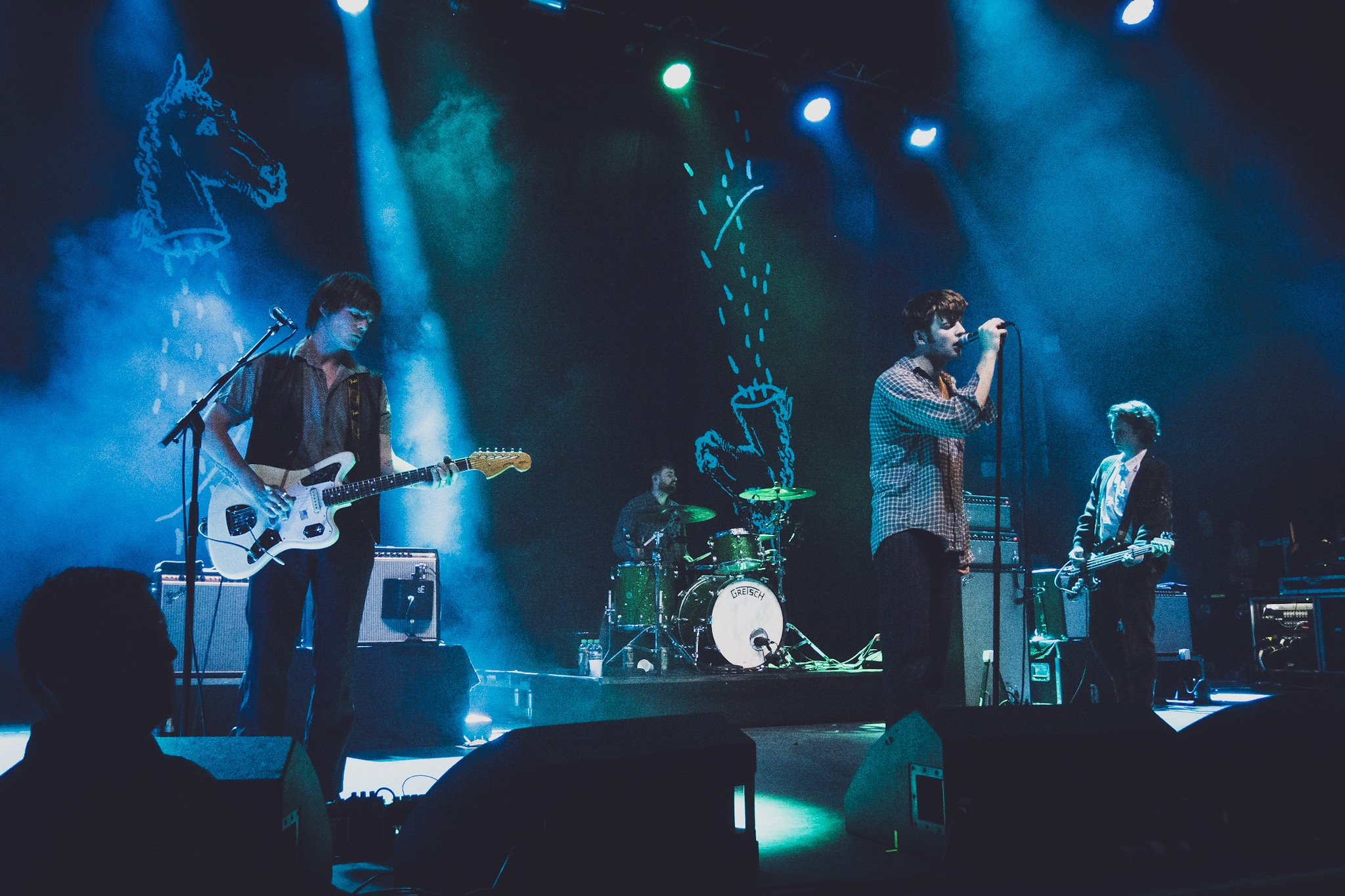
- Fontaines D.C. performing in 2019

Background information
- Origin: Dublin, Ireland
- Genres: Indie rock; post-punk; crank wave; alternative rock
- Years active: 2014–present
- Labels: Partisan; XL
- Members: Grian Chatten; Conor Curley; Conor Deegan III; Tom Coll; Carlos O'Connell
- Past members: Josh O'Connor
- Website: fontainesdc.com

Fontaines D.C. are an Irish rock band formed in Dublin in 2014. The band consists of Grian Chatten (vocals), Conor Curley (guitar), Conor "Deego" Deegan III (bass), Tom Coll (drums), and Carlos O'Connell (guitar).

Formed at BIMM Dublin, the band signed to Partisan Records in 2018 and released the debut album Dogrel in 2019 to widespread critical acclaim; it was listed as Album of the Year on record store Rough Trade's website, voted Album of the Year by presenters on BBC Radio 6 Music, and nominated for the Mercury Prize and the Choice Music Prize. The band's second album, A Hero's Death (2020), was nominated for Best Rock Album at the 2021 Grammy Awards. Their third album Skinty Fia (2022) became their first number one on the Irish and UK Albums Chart and contributed to them winning the Brit Award for International Group. During their rise, Fontaines D.C. were grouped into the contemporary wave of ascending Irish post-punk bands.

The band's first-week sales numbers more than doubled with their fourth album, Romance (2024), which received two Grammy nominations and a Mercury Prize nomination. Its lead single, "Starburster", became their first to chart in the UK.

== History ==
=== 2014: Formation ===
Carlos O'Connell, Conor Curley, Conor Deegan, Grian Chatten and Tom Coll met while attending music college at BIMM in The Liberties, Dublin. They bonded over a common love of poetry and released two collections of poetry called Vroom, inspired by the Beat poets (Jack Kerouac, Allen Ginsberg) and Winding, inspired by Irish poets Patrick Kavanagh, James Joyce, W. B. Yeats. None of the published poems were translated into songs, but the track "Television Screens" on their debut Dogrel began as a poem and was turned into a song.

Lead singer Chatten is half-English (his mother is English and his father is Irish). He was born in Barrow-in-Furness, Cumbria, but grew up in the coastal town of Skerries, north of Dublin City. Before starting Fontaines D.C., Chatten played in local indie rock bands Gun Runner and Thumbprint as drummer and guitarist/singer respectively. Coll and Deegan are from Castlebar in County Mayo, Curley is from Emyvale in County Monaghan, and Carlos O’Connell was born in Madrid to a Spanish father and an Irish mother. At 18, he left Spain to move to Dublin. Deegan is regularly seen wearing Mayo GAA clothing during live performances.

The band took their name from Johnny Fontane, a character in the movie The Godfather portrayed by Al Martino, who was a singer and movie star and godson of Vito Corleone. The band was first called The Fontaines, but the initials "D.C." were added when they found that a band in Los Angeles had the same name. The initials stand for "Dublin City", to reflect the city of their formation.

=== 2015–2018: Early career ===
Fontaines D.C. started out self-releasing singles. In 2015, they were going to release their debut with music journalist John Robb's Louder Than War label. In May 2017, the band released the single "Liberty Belle", followed by "Hurricane Laughter"/"Winter In the Sun". "Liberty Belle" was written in homage to the Liberties, a neighbourhood in Dublin where some of the band members lived.

In 2018, Fontaines released the single "Chequeless Reckless"/"Boys In The Better Land" and "Too Real". Stereogum, who premiered "Chequeless Reckless" in early 2018, described their sound as "a synthesis between post-punk, garage rock, and a kind of gritty, urbane sense of rhythm and narrative" and named them a 'Band To Watch'. In May 2018, Fontaines played an in-studio gig at KEXP in Seattle. In September 2018, Fontaines played on the Body & Soul stage at Electric Picnic, to positive reviews "Brilliant and Bracing". In November 2018, the band signed with Partisan Records. The band toured the UK and Ireland as support act for fellow post-punk band Shame.

They released music videos directed by frequent collaborator Hugh Mulhern. The video for 2018's "Too Real" was inspired by The Pogues's 1985 song, "A Pair of Brown Eyes" and the band Gilla Band. The 2019 video for "Roy's Tune", co-written by Conor Curley, was directed by Liam Papadachi. It was inspired by Curley's late night walks home from a job at a burrito shop.

Fontaines received tour support from Irish Arts Council which allowed them to tour internationally. They also received grant funding from RTÉ 2fm.

=== 2019–2020: Dogrel ===
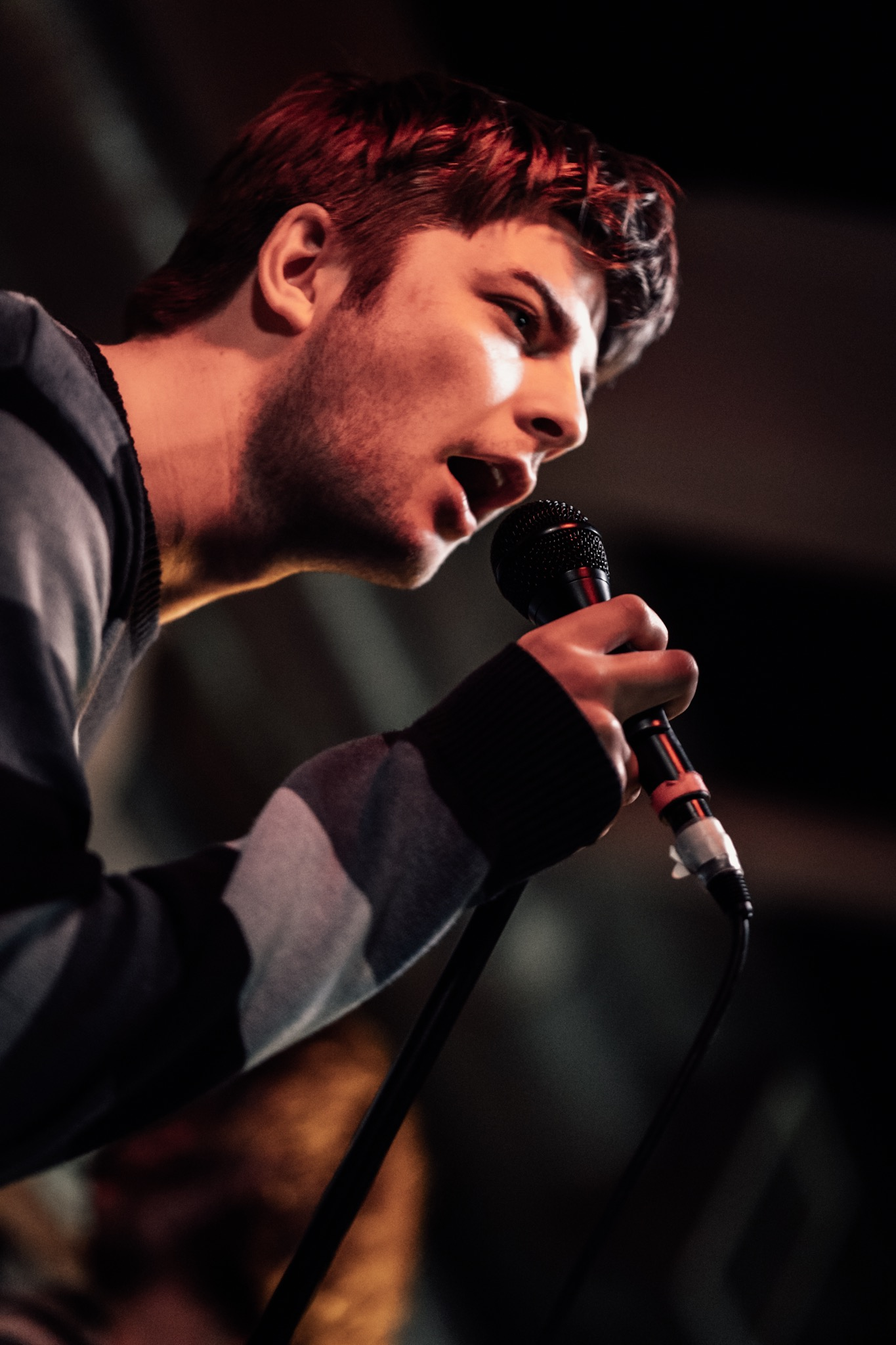
Grian Chatten with the band in 2019

On 12 April 2019, the band released their debut album Dogrel on Partisan Records. The title was a homage to Doggerel, working class poetry – 'poetry of the people' – that dates back to 1630 and was popularised by William McGonagall and later Ogden Nash. The record was recorded live on tape.

The NME said that "Dogrel proves that early-days pinning as punk’s next great hope was perhaps premature – there's far more to Fontaines D.C. than your typical thrashed-out, pissed-off young rebellion." The Guardian gave the album a five-star review, hailing it as a "perfect debut", and commending Chatten for embracing the Dublin accent. The Times said that "Shouty post-punk bands are making a surprise comeback in 2019, with this brutal but articulate Irish bunch emerging as one of the most captivating. Capturing the feeling of living in Dublin as it balances historical weight with financial upheaval, the singer Grian Chattan makes his statement of intent by announcing in a monotone rant on the opener, Big: “Dublin in the rain is mine, a pregnant city with a Catholic mind.""

In 2019, the band toured 50 cities throughout Ireland, Europe, and North America. They have toured with Shame and Idles. FDC played main stage on the Friday night, of All Together Now 2019. They played nine sets at SXSW 2019 over the course of five days, selling out venues, and count Gilla Band as a major influence. They were the musical guests on The Tonight Show Starring Jimmy Fallon on 1 May 2019, performing "Boys in the Better Land".

In January 2020, the band headlined the Rockaway Beach Festival - notable as being one of the only live events to happen in the UK that year. The band was also expecting to perform at the Glastonbury Festival in 2020, which was to have been the festival's 50th anniversary, but the event had to be cancelled because of the COVID-19 pandemic. On 14 July 2020, Fontaines D.C. performed a live set from Dublin's Kilmainham Gaol as part of the live television series, Other Voices. A recording of the performance was released on vinyl as a limited edition release for Record Store Day on 12 June 2021 and later as a surprise digital release on 26 November 2021.

=== 2020–2021: A Hero's Death ===
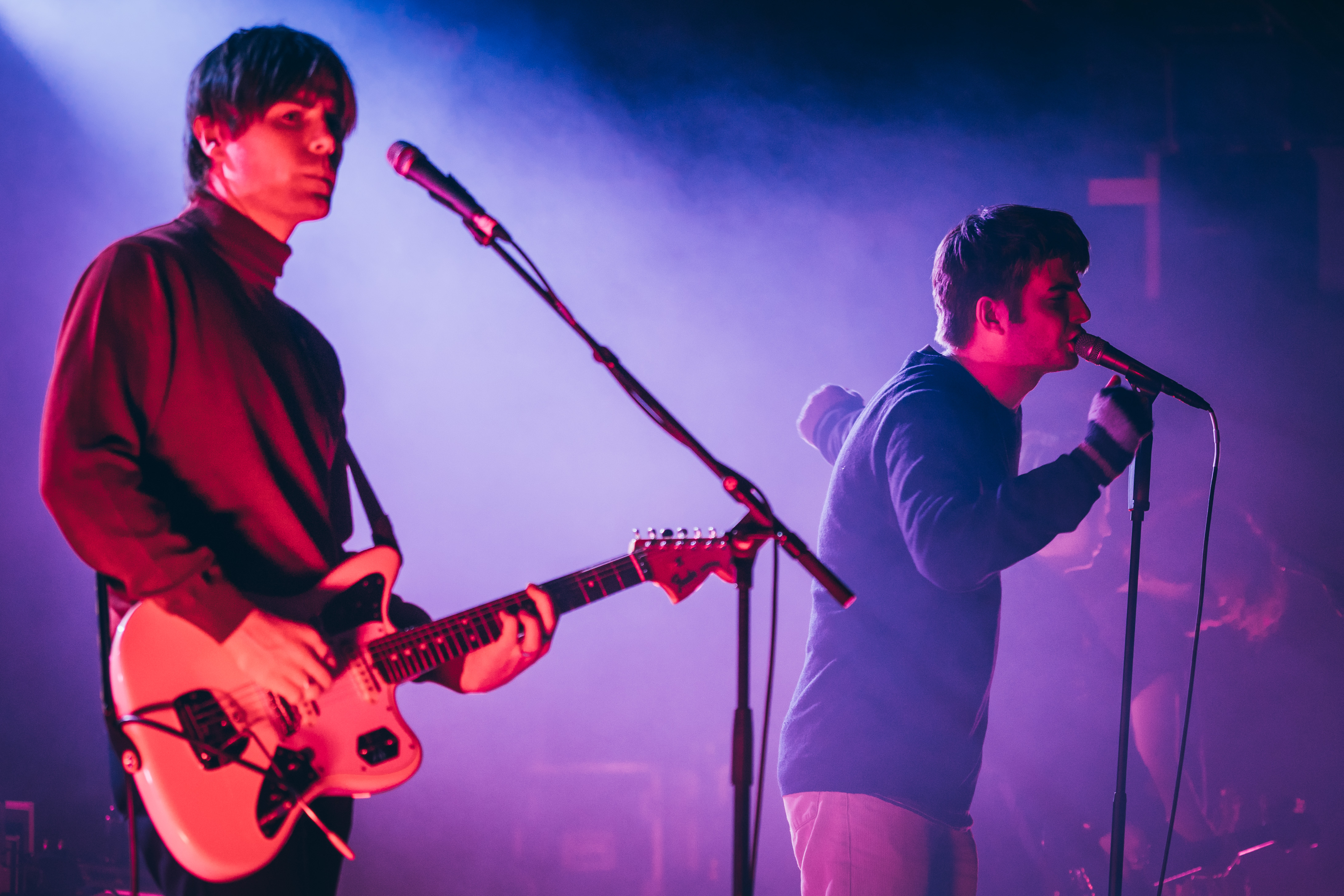
Fontaines D.C. performing in 2020

The band released their second album, A Hero's Death, on 31 July 2020. The title track was released on 5 May 2020 with a video featuring actor Aidan Gillen. Chatten described the single as "a list of rules for the self". It was a tribute to one of their fans who died of COVID early in the pandemic. Three further singles were released from the album: "I Don't Belong", "Televised Mind" and "A Lucid Dream". A Hero's Death debuted at number two on the UK Albums Chart after Taylor Swift advanced the release date for Folklore when the midweek charts had Fontaines D.C. on top by over 10,000 copies. Swift's manoeuvre resulted in Folklore remaining at number one by 3,500 copies.

The band returned to The Tonight Show as musical guests on 28 January 2021, performing "A Hero's Death". The album was nominated for Best Rock Album at the 2021 Grammy Awards.

=== 2022–2023: Skinty Fia ===
In January 2022, the band announced their third studio album, Skinty Fia, which was released on 22 April 2022. To coincide with the announcement the band shared the lead single, "Jackie Down the Line" with accompanying video. They also advance-released the singles "I Love You", "Skinty Fia" and "Roman Holiday" from the album, with one described by Chatten as "the first overtly political song we’ve written." Skinty Fia debuted at number one on the UK Albums Chart and the Irish Albums Chart. In the summer of 2022 the band played European music festivals, including Primavera Sound and Glastonbury.

In June 2023, Chatten released a debut solo album, Chaos for the Fly. In December 2023, the band announced a collaborative EP with Massive Attack and Young Fathers titled Ceasefire to raise money for Doctors Without Borders in Gaza.

=== 2024–2025: Romance ===
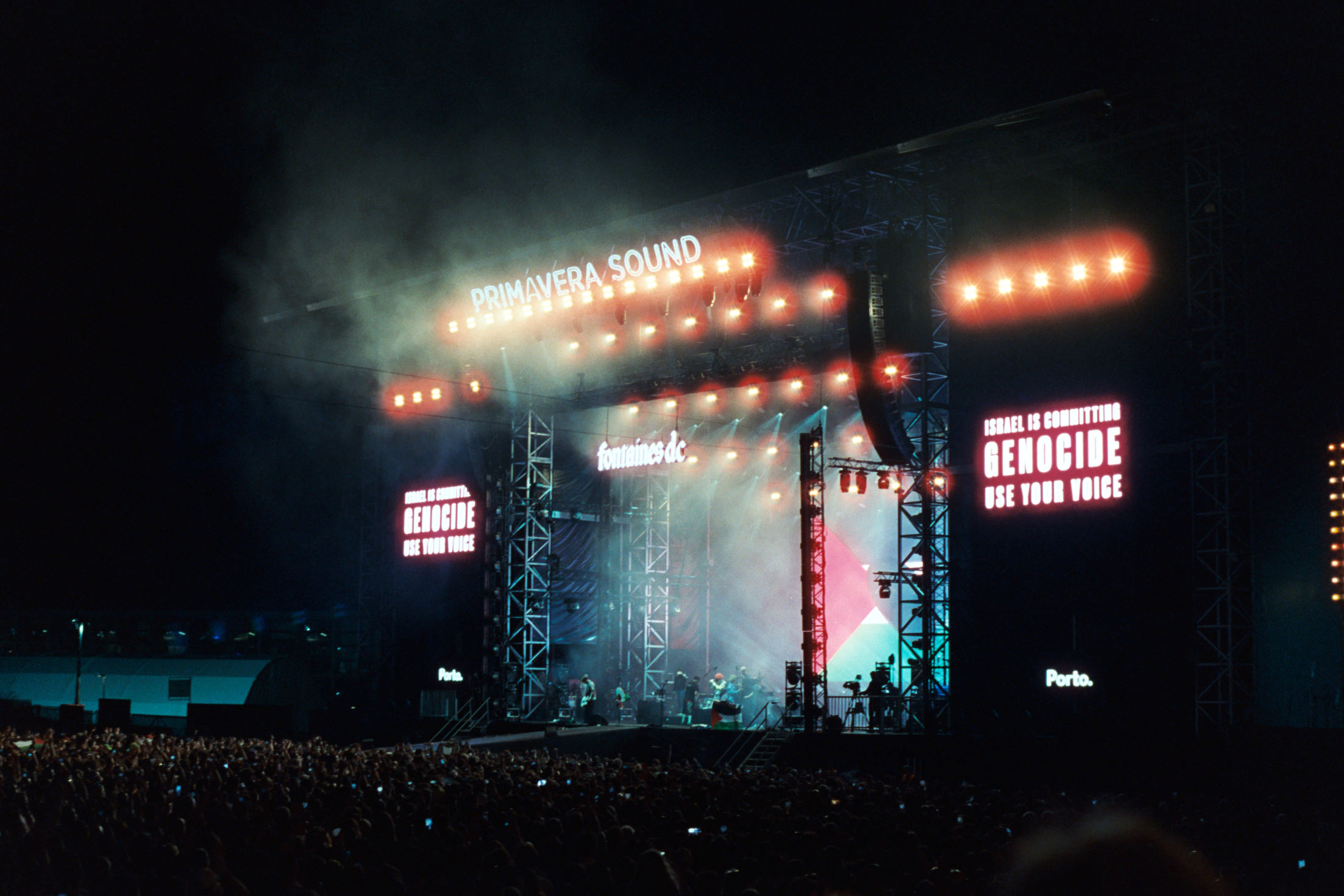
Fontaines D.C. performing at Primavera Sound Porto in 2025

On 17 April 2024, the band announced their fourth album, Romance, to be released on XL Recordings. The band released the single "Starburster" at the same time and made the album available for pre-order. For Romance, the band worked with producer James Ford. Romance was released on 23 August 2024. It debuted at No. 2 in the UK, where it doubled the first-week sales of Skinty Fia, as well as in Belgium, Ireland and the Netherlands, while reaching the top 10 in a total of 12 European countries. It was also the band's first album to chart in the United States, where it reached No. 97 on the Billboard 200. The singles "Starburster", "Favourite" and "In the Modern World" reached No. 57, No. 69 and No. 52 on the UK Singles Chart, respectively, the band's first.

The band's music was featured throughout the 2024 feature film, Bird, directed by Andrea Arnold. The music video for "Bug", starring Barry Keoghan, was composed of footage from the film, with the band stating, "Andrea Arnold was kind enough to cut up a sequence to our tune "Bug" featuring Barry Keoghan playing the character Bug in her latest movie Bird. Big thanks to Andrea Arnold for letting us in so close to her visionary universe. She'll be remembered how we remember Bacon or Goya." Multi-instrumentalist Carlos O'Connell made his acting debut in the film, with the Institute of Contemporary Arts describing his performance as "playing a pivotal role in perhaps the film’s most memorable musical moment."

The band received two nominations at the 2025 Grammy Awards for Best Rock Album for Romance and Best Alternative Music Performance for "Starburster". On 21 February 2025, the band released a stand-alone single, "It's Amazing to Be Young", which was recorded during the same sessions as Romance, but left off the album to keep it "concise". It was included on the deluxe version of Romance along with a second new track, "Before You I Just Forget", written by guitarist Conor Curley.

Fontaines D.C.'s 7 June 2025 performance at the Primavera Sound festival in Barcelona attracted media attention when the band displayed a Palestinian flag on the screen, as well as the phrases "free Palestine" and "Israel is committing genocide – use your voice", during their performance of the song "I Love You". In September 2025, the band joined the "No Music for Genocide" boycott to geo-block their music from music streaming platforms in Israel in protest of the Gaza genocide.

"Starburster" was used as the theme music for the Paramount+ TV series MobLand which premiered on 30 March 2025. In August 2025, the band headlined at All Together Now. "Roman holiday" was also used in the final episode of Gavin and Stacey.

=== 2026–present: Dopamine Chamber ===
In March 2026, the band appeared on the Help(2) charity compilation album in support of War Child. They recorded a cover of Sinead O'Connor's "Black Boys on Mopeds" for the compilation, an experience they described as "unique and life affirming". In April 2026, the band were announced as part of that year's Electric Picnic lineup. A series of headlining shows in Spain were announced in May. In June, the band announced the death of their longtime manager Trevor Dietz at the age of 47. Dietz's death was confirmed as a suicide by falling from a height.

After teasing on social media, the band formally announced their fifth studio album, Dopamine Chamber on 18 August 2026 with the lead single "Marianne". On 28 August, the band headlined Reading Festival. On 30 August 2026, they headlined the final day of Electric Picnic, and a day later, the band announced two concerts at Slane Castle in June 2027. The second single "Tongue" was released on 30 September, and the third single "Where Is Gone?" was released on 12 October, featuring Spanish singer-songwriter Rosalía – the band's first guest vocalist on a track. Dopamine Chamber was released on 16 October.

== Band members ==
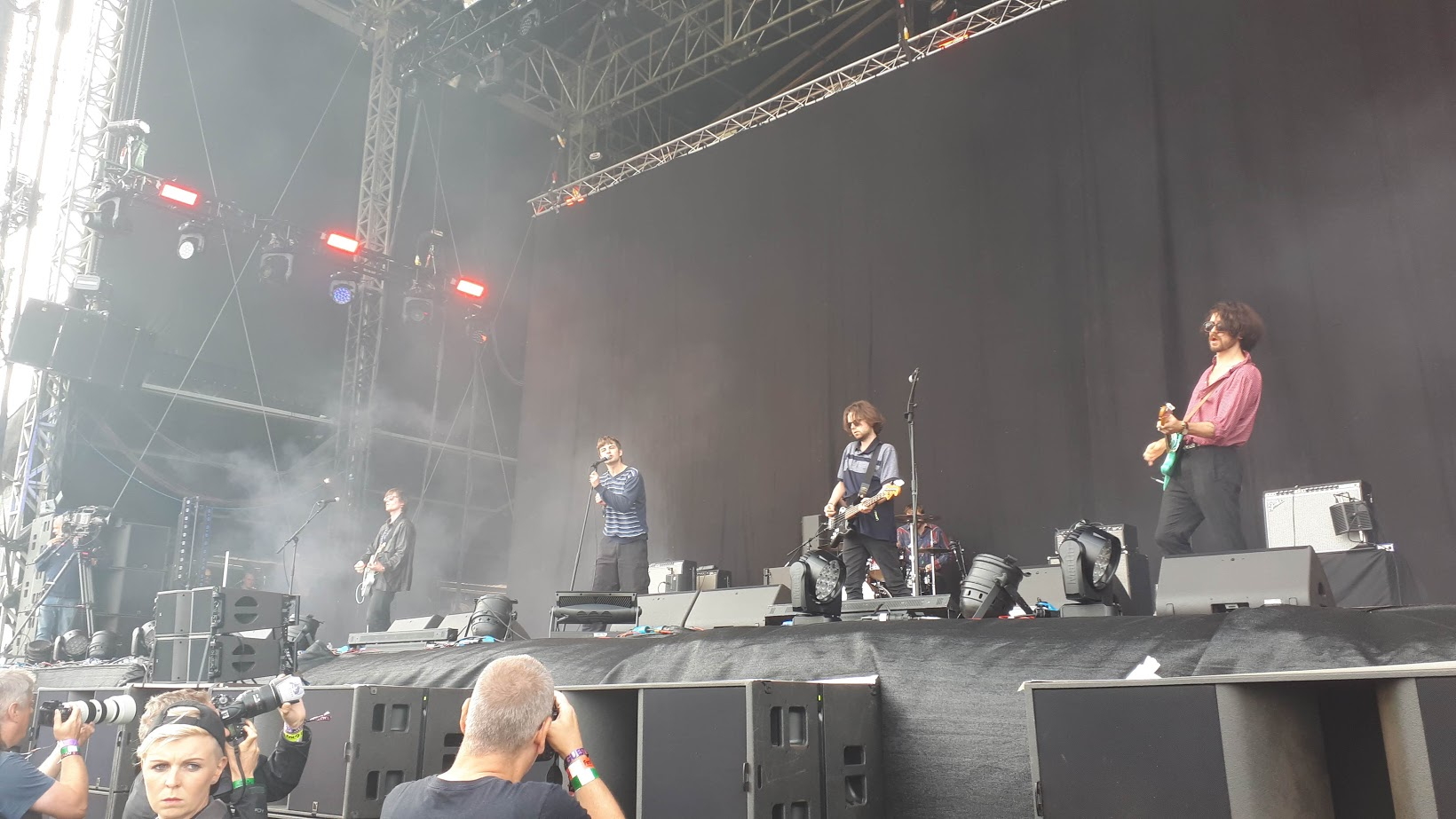
Fontaines D.C performing at The Downs Festival in Bristol during the Dogrel tour in 2019.

- Grian Chatten – lead vocals, percussion, acoustic guitar, accordion (2014–present)
- Conor Curley – guitar, keyboards, synthesizer, piano, bass guitar, backing vocals (2014–present)
- Conor "Deego" Deegan III – bass guitar, guitar, backing vocals (2014–present)
- Tom Coll – drums, percussion, guitar (2014–present)
- Carlos O'Connell – guitar, keyboards, synthesizer, piano, backing vocals (2016–present)

Current touring musicians

- Alexander "Chilli" Jesson – keyboards, synthesizer, piano, guitar, bass guitar, percussion, backing vocals (2023–present)

Former members

- Josh O'Connor – guitar (2014–2015)

Former touring musicians

- Cathal Mac Gabhann – guitar (2023; substitute for Carlos O'Connell)

== Discography ==
- Dogrel (2019)
- A Hero's Death (2020)
- Skinty Fia (2022)
- Romance (2024)
- Dopamine Chamber (2026)

== Awards and nominations ==
Award	Year	Category	Nominated work	Result	Ref.
AIM Independent Music Awards	2019	Best Independent Track	Boys In The Better Land	Nominated	
AIM Independent Music Awards	2019	Best Independent Album	Dogrel	Nominated	
AIM Independent Music Awards	2020	UK Independent Breakthrough	Fontaines D. C.	Nominated	
AIM Independent Music Awards	2020	PPL Award for Most Played New Independent Artist	Fontaines D. C.	Nominated	
AIM Independent Music Awards	2021	Best Second Album	A Hero's Death	Won	
AIM Independent Music Awards	2021	International Breakthrough	Fontaines D.C.	Nominated	
AIM Independent Music Awards	2022	Best Creative Campaign	Skinty Fia	Nominated	
Brit Awards	2021	International Group	Fontaines D.C.	Nominated	
Brit Awards	2023	International Group	Fontaines D.C.	Won	
Brit Awards	2025	International Group	Fontaines D.C.	Won	
Choice Music Prize	2019	Best Album	Dogrel	Nominated	
Choice Music Prize	2020	Best Album	A Hero's Death	Nominated	
Choice Music Prize	2022	Best Album	Skinty Fia	Nominated	
Choice Music Prize	2022	Artist of the Year	Fontaines D.C.	Won	
Choice Music Prize	2022	Best Song	"I Love You"	Nominated	
Choice Music Prize	2024	Best Album	Romance	Won	
Choice Music Prize	2024	Artist of the Year	Fontaines D.C.	Nominated	
Choice Music Prize	2024	Best Song	"Starburster"	Nominated	
DIY	2019	Class of 2019	Fontaines D.C.	Included	
Grammy Awards	2021	Best Rock Album	A Hero's Death	Nominated	
Grammy Awards	2025	Best Rock Album	Romance	Nominated	
Grammy Awards	2025	Best Alternative Music Performance	"Starburster"	Nominated	
Ivor Novello Awards	2021	Album Award	A Hero's Death	Nominated	
Ivor Novello Awards	2023	Album Award	Skinty Fia	Nominated	
Ivor Novello Awards	2025	Best Song, Musically and Lyrically	"In the Modern World"	Nominated	
Libera Awards	2020	Best Live Act	Fontaines D.C.	Nominated	
Libera Awards	2020	Best Breakthrough Artist/Release	Fontaines D.C.	Nominated	
Libera Awards	2020	Best Alternative Rock Album	Dogrel	Won	
Libera Awards	2020	Video of the Year	"Big"	Nominated	
Libera Awards	2021	Best Live Act	Fontaines D.C.	Nominated	
Libera Awards	2021	Best Rock Record	A Hero's Death	Won	
Libera Awards	2023	Best Rock Record	Skinty Fia	Won	
Libera Awards	2023	Marketing Genius	Skinty Fia	Nominated	
Libera Awards	2023	Video of the Year	"Jackie Down the Line"	Nominated	
Libera Awards	2025	Best Rock Record	Romance	Won	
Mercury Prize	2019	Best Album	Dogrel	Nominated	
Mercury Prize	2025	Best Album	Romance	Nominated	
NME Awards	2022	Best Band in the World	Fontaines D.C.	Won	
Rough Trade	2019	Albums of the Year	Dogrel	Won	
Q Awards	2019	Breakthrough Act	Fontaines D.C.	Nominated	
UK Music Video Awards	2021	Best Live Video	"A Hero's Death" (live from Jimmy Fallon)	Nominated	
UK Music Video Awards	2022	Best Live Video	"Jackie Down the Line" (live from Jimmy Fallon)	Nominated	
UK Music Video Awards	2024	Best Rock Video – International	"Here's the Thing"	Nominated	
UK Music Video Awards	2024	Best Rock Video – International	"Starburster"	Won	
UK Music Video Awards	2024	Best Styling in a Video	"Starburster"	Nominated	
UK Music Video Awards	2024	Best Styling in a Video	"Here's the Thing"	Won	
UK Music Video Awards	2024	Best Cinematography in a Video	"Here's the Thing"	Nominated	
UK Music Video Awards	2025	Best Rock Video – International	"It's Amazing to Be Young"	Nominated	
UK Music Video Awards	2025	Best Rock / Alternative Video – Newcomer	"In the Modern World"	Won	

== Works and publications ==
- Vroom (self-published) – poetry chapbook
- Winding (self-published) – poetry chapbook

== See also ==
- List of Irish Grammy Award winners and nominees
