= Fenian (album) =

Studio album by Kneecap
- Released: 1 May 2026
- Studios: Mr Dan's (London); Mr Punch (London); Downstairs at Erik's (Los Angeles)
- Genres: Hip-hop; punk-rap
- Length: 42:32
- Languages: English; Irish
- Label: Heavenly
- Producer: Dan Carey

Kneecap chronology
Fine Art (Remixes) (2024)	Fenian (2026)

Singles from Fenian
- 1. "Liars Tale" Released: 28 January 2026; 2. "Smugglers & Scholars" Released: 24 February 2026; 3. "Fenian" Released: 1 April 2026; 4. "Irish Goodbye" Released: 28 April 2026

Fenian is the second studio album by the Irish hip-hop trio Kneecap, released on 1 May 2026 through Heavenly Recordings. It is produced by Dan Carey. Preceded by the release of singles "Liars Tale", "Smugglers & Scholars", "Fenian" (with Casiokids), and "Irish Goodbye" (featuring Kae Tempest), the album contains 14 songs including collaborations with Fawzi and Lankum's Radie Peat. A world tour in promotion of the album is scheduled to run until February 2027, with shows in Latin America, Europe, and New Zealand.

== Background and production ==
Following the release of the mixtape 3CAG (2018), Kneecap (consisting of Móglaí Bap, Mo Chara, and DJ Próvaí) released their debut studio album, Fine Art, in 2024. That same year, they released a self-titled biopic, which went on to win a BAFTA Award in the category of Outstanding Debut by a British Writer, Director or Producer. Since the release of Fine Art, the trio have released a handful of standalone singles; however, none of them are included on the track listing of Fenian. In 2025, Kneecap lost their U.S. visa sponsor following anti-Israeli messages about the Gaza genocide displayed onstage during their set at Coachella in April. The group had to cancel a North American tour and decided to spend time in the studio to "reinvent their public image".

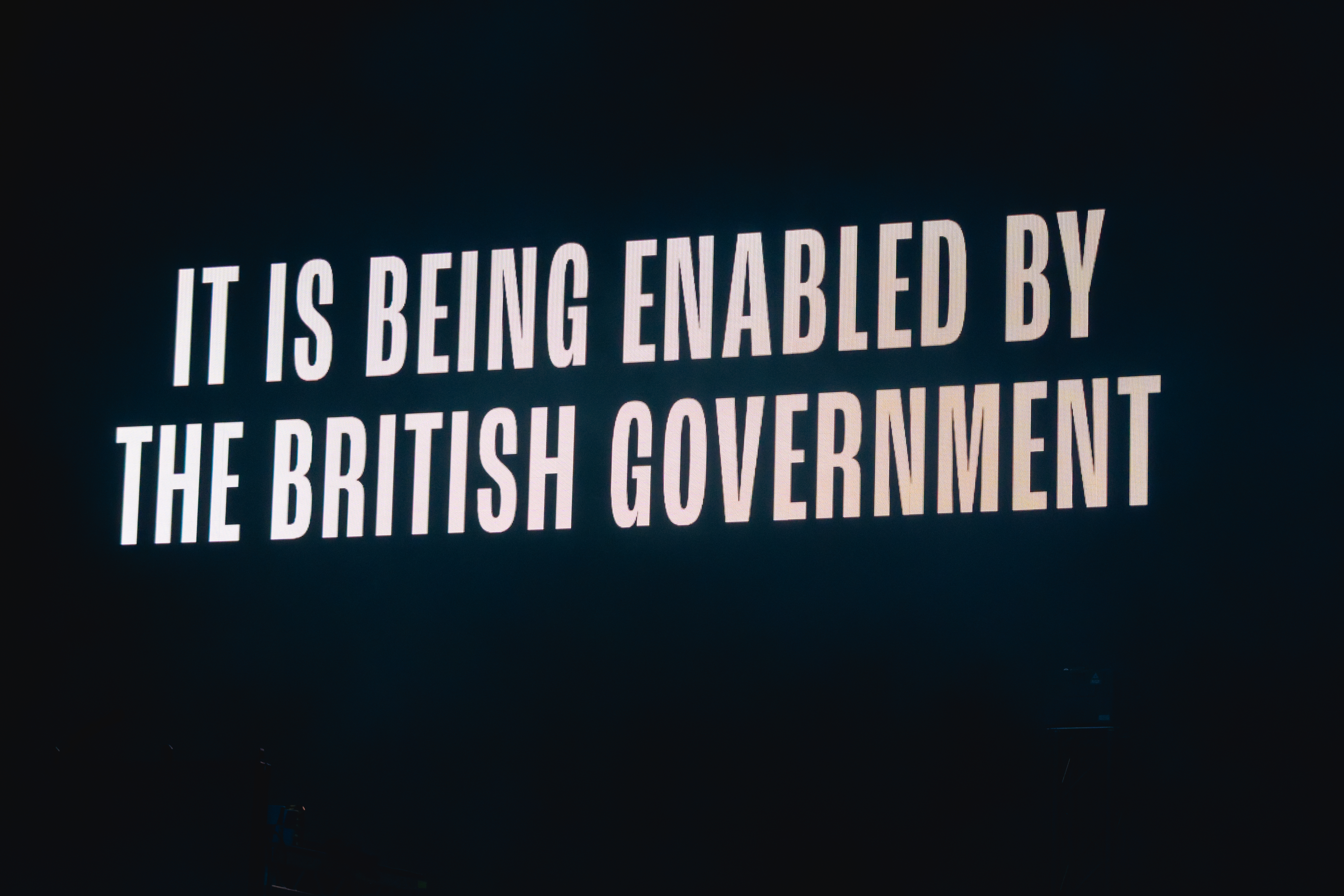
Kneecap worked on Fenian after controversy over their onstage political messaging resulted in the cancellation of a tour; this example from Wide Awake in 2025 criticises the UK government's role in the Gaza genocide.

Principal work on Fenian began in September 2025 at the same time as Mo Chara was dealing with a terrorism-related charge for allegedly waving a Hezbollah flag onstage, in a case which was later dismissed. The case would serve as one of the main influences for the album. The trio worked on Fenian with producer Dan Carey, who Mo Chara met via Grian Chatten; Kneecap had previously finished a follow-up to Fine Art with a different producer in early 2025, but this was scrapped after they were dissatisfied with their output sounding too similar to their debut album. The group sought Carey's help to create an album that was "more mature and musical", and to arrange the songs to be more suitable to play in an arena setting. Mo Chara and Móglaí Bap lived in Streatham, in South London, for seven weeks to work with Carey while DJ Próvaí stayed in Ireland. During this time, Móglaí Bap came up with lyrics to songs like "Cold at the Top" and "Cocaine Hill" while spending around an hour a day in a bathtub. In the studio, Carey mainly used analogue synthesisers and other analogue instruments, with many songs being written and produced at the same time.

Two songs on Fenian ("Occupied 6" and "Gael Phonics") came from the scrapped album, while the rest were cut. For "Palestine", the group felt it was important to include the perspective of Palestinians, so they reached out to Ramallah-based rapper Fawzi through mutual connections, providing him with a rough idea of what they envisioned. "Cocaine Hill" was a previously unfinished song that ended up being one of the last songs completed on the album.

We hope that this album reflects that it's not just about us. It's called Fenian—and not Kneecap—because a Fenian is somebody who stands up, who resists, and who doesn't give up on what they believe in.

— Kneecap member Móglaí Bap on the album title

The album's name comes from a word that is used for warriors from medieval Ireland and later repurposed to refer to modern-day revolutionaries fighting for Irish republicanism; it is also used as a slur for Irish Catholics. According to Mo Chara, selecting the word as the album title was a way for the group to reclaim their language and heritage.

== Composition ==
Fawzi raps a verse in Arabic on "Palestine"

The album's sound has been described as "old-school gangsta rap mixed with the monster-truck onslaught of peak Prodigy", with influences of grime, post-punk, techno, and West Coast hip-hop. DJ Próvaí confirmed that the Prodigy were an influence, as well as the 1990s UK rave scene in general, which he credited with helping to unite people in Northern Ireland. Mo Chara's court case and Kneecap's large-scale concert at Wembley Arena also served as influences for the album. The lyrics of Fenian are in a mixture of English and Irish, with "Palestine" containing verses in Arabic by Palestinian rapper Fawzi. The album is divided into two thematic parts: one focused on the band's private lives and one on the public.

Fenian opens with "Éire go Deo" (transl. "Ireland forever"), a song about the Irish language, whose sound has been described as chillstep, acid house and "trip-hop Enya". "Smugglers & Scholars", which is inspired by the sound of Detroit hip-hop, reflects on the Irish revolutionary period; its title is a play on "land of saints and scholars", an epithet used to describe Ireland. The media circus surrounding Mo Chara's court case is addressed in "Carnival", which features a beat in the style of Massive Attack. It incorporates a "Free Mo Chara" chant that Carey recorded from crowds outside the courthouse. "Palestine" discusses generational trauma and the war in Gaza, comparing the settler colonialism of Ireland and in Palestine. The Gaza war is also referenced in "Liars Tale", which has lyrics directly calling out British prime minister Keir Starmer and his position on the conflict while also describing the situation as a genocide. The song incorporates elements of industrial music while "Big Mad Mo" is an acid techno and electro track.

"Headcase" is a drum and bass song about an addict, while "An Ra" envisions an end to British rule in Ireland, with RA standing for Ríocht Aontaithe (transl. "United Kingdom"). "Occupied 6" is about paramilitary attacks during the Troubles, with its title referring to the six counties that make up Northern Ireland. "Gael Phonics" is an explanation of different words in Irish. "Cocaine Hill", featuring long-time collaborator Radie Peat, is a song about the dark side of fame and is accompanied by prog guitars in the style of Pink Floyd. It is based on the blues song "Cocaine Blues", popularised by Reverend Gary Davis, and samples John Martyn's version titled "Cocain". The album closer, "Irish Goodbye", was written as a tribute to Móglaí Bap's mother, who died by suicide in 2020 after suffering from depression.

== Promotion ==
On 22 January 2026, mobile digital billboards began appearing in Belfast, with a phone number being promoted to 'report fenian activity'. The band later posted a teaser promoting a new single titled "Liars Tale". The link between the billboards and the band was confirmed on 27 January, when another teaser was released, featuring phone calls to the number advertised on the billboards. The following day, the band announced Fenian would be released on 24 April 2026, on the 110th anniversary of the Easter Rising. The release date was later delayed by one week.

"Liars Tale", the album's lead single, premiered on BBC Radio 1 on 28 January 2026. Featuring the three group members in guillotines, its music video was directed by Thomas James, who said he wanted to "embody the 2 + 2 = 5 hellscape we seem to be surrounded by". The song debuted at number 79 on the Irish Singles Chart. Premiering on Apple Music 1, "Smugglers & Scholars" was released as the second single on 24 February. The title track was released as the third single on 1 April, and was accompanied by a music video shot in western Belfast and also directed by James. "Irish Goodbye", featuring Kae Tempest, was released as a single on 28 April. It was accompanied by a 12-minute short film starring actors Liam Cunningham and Deirdre O'Kane.

Songs from Fenian were first performed at the album's launch party on 20 April at Limelight in Belfast. A series of outstore shows were planned for the album's release week, as well as a number of listening parties across Ireland, England, and Scotland on 27 April, with the album played in its entirety. In February 2026, Kneecap announced fourteen European dates for the Fenian Tour, which started on 8 June in Bilbao, Spain. It was later expanded to a world tour, with shows in Latin America and New Zealand, and dates until February 2027. The band faced opposition from certain local politicians, who tried to stop shows from taking place in Sweden and Switzerland.

On 5 May 2026, Kneecap digitally released a deluxe version of the album with two remixes: a Killer Mike remix of "Smugglers & Scholars" and a 3D remix of "Palestine". The "Palestine" remix was later included on the soundtrack to the Gaza documentary Life Support (2026), and pressed as a twelve-inch vinyl, with its artwork paying homage to the album art for Inflammable Material (1979) by Irish punk band Stiff Little Fingers. Fenian (Live at Rough Trade) was released in November 2026, with songs recorded at a Rough Trade East concert earlier in the year. A Shanti Celeste remix of "Cold at the Top" was released on 26 June, while a Kelly Lee Owens remix of "Fenian" was released on 10 November 2026.

== Critical reception ==
Professional ratings
Aggregate scores
Source	Rating
AnyDecentMusic?	7.9/10
Metacritic	82/100
Review scores
Source	Rating
Clash	7/10
Financial Times	4/5 stars
The Independent	4/5 stars
The Irish Times	5/5 stars
Mojo	4/5 stars
MusicOMH	4.5/5 stars
NME	4.5/5 stars
Pitchfork	7.7/10
Rolling Stone	3.5/5 stars
The Times	4/5 stars

Fenian received positive reviews from critics, with the album receiving praise for being a serious follow-up to Fine Art. According to the review aggregator Metacritic, Fenian received "universal acclaim" based on a weighted average score of 82 out of 100 from sixteen critic scores. The review aggregator AnyDecentMusic? gave the album a weighted average score of 7.9 out of 10 from twenty critic scores.

In a five-star review, Ed Power of The Irish Times called Fenian a "stunning record" that is "brilliantly catchy and playful". Ellie Carr of The List and Daniel Dylan Wray of Uncut both praised Kneecap's musical maturity, with the former calling the album "faultlessly produced" and the latter calling it "accomplished". Simon Price of Record Collector opined that the trio sounded "better than ever", and praised the Fawzi collaboration "Palestine".

Reviewers complimented Carey's production, as well as the mixture of genres on the album. "Irish Goodbye" was highlighted as a standout track, with Alexis Petridis of The Guardian calling it "a skilfully done conclusion". Criticism among reviews took aim at certain lyrics that were deemed ineffective or absurd, and the band's humour that was regarded at times as annoying or immature.

=== Awards and lists ===
At the 2026 UK Music Video Awards, Kneecap won in the category of Best Alternative Video (International) for "Irish Goodbye". The video additionally received nominations in the category of Best Special Visual Project, Best Performance in a Video, Best Casting in a Video, and Best Colour Grading in a Video. On mid-year lists of the best albums of 2026 so far, Fenian was ranked number three by Exclaim!, and it was also included on NME's unranked list. On year-end lists, the album was ranked number two by Rough Trade.

== Commercial performance ==
Fenian debuted at number two on the UK Albums Chart and number one on the Official Vinyl Albums Chart. The album had been the frontrunner to top the overall chart according to mid-week projections by the Official Charts Company, but it was ultimately beaten by the compilation The Essential Michael Jackson (2005). According to figures from Music Week, the album sold 23,983 units in its first week.

In the Republic of Ireland, the album debuted at number one on the Irish Albums Chart as well as the Independent Albums Chart. Kneecap charted in Australia for the first time, with Fenian debuting at number seven on the ARIA Albums Chart.

== Track listing ==
Fenian track listing
No.	Title	Lyrics	Music	Length
1.	"Éire go Deo" (transl. "Ireland Forever")	Naoise Ó Cairealláin; Liam Óg Ó hAnnaidh; Rose Connolly	Daniel Carey	2:19
2.	"Smugglers & Scholars"	Ó Cairealláin; Ó hAnnaidh	Carey	3:11
3.	"Carnival"	Ó Cairealláin; Ó hAnnaidh	Carey	2:52
4.	"Palestine" (featuring Fawzi)	Ó Cairealláin; Ó hAnnaidh; Fawzi Sulaiman	Carey; Jason Jerry Scheff	2:36
5.	"Liars Tale"	Ó Cairealláin; Ó hAnnaidh	Carey	3:17
6.	"Fenian" (with Casiokids)	Ó Cairealláin; Ó hAnnaidh	Carey; Kjetil Aabø; Ketil Endresen; Omar Johnsen; Fredrik Vogsborg	3:14
7.	"Big Bad Mo"	Ó Cairealláin; Ó hAnnaidh	Carey	3:44
8.	"Headcase"	Ó Cairealláin; Ó hAnnaidh	Carey; Liam Toon	2:40
9.	"An Ra" (transl. "The UK")	Ó Cairealláin; Ó hAnnaidh	Carey	3:40
10.	"Cold at the Top"	Ó Cairealláin; Ó hAnnaidh	Carey	3:20
11.	"Occupied 6"	Ó hAnnaidh	Carey; Holly Whitaker	2:04
12.	"Gael Phonics"	Ó Cairealláin; Ó hAnnaidh	Carey; Thomas Bell	2:34
13.	"Cocaine Hill" (featuring Radie Peat)	Ó Cairealláin; Ó hAnnaidh	Carey; Iain McGeachy	3:27
14.	"Irish Goodbye" (featuring Kae Tempest)	Ó Cairealláin; Kae Tempest	Carey	3:34
Total length:				42:32

Fenian (Deluxe) bonus tracks
No.	Title	Length
15.	"Smugglers & Scholars" (featuring Killer Mike)	3:30
16.	"Palestine" (3D remix; featuring Fawzi)	3:39

=== Notes ===
- "Éire go Deo" contains a sample of "Caoine" performed by Róis.
- "Palestine" contains a vocal sample by JJ Scheff.
- "Fenian" is stylised in all caps.
- "Fenian" contains a sample of "Fot i hose", written and performed by Casiokids (Fredrik Vogsborg, Omar Johnsen, Kjetil Bjøreid Aabø, and Ketil Kinden Endresen).
- Casiokids are not credited as collaborators on physical editions of the album.
- "Cocaine Hill" contains an interpolation of "Cocain" performed by John Martyn.

== Personnel ==
Credits are adapted from Tidal.

=== Kneecap ===
- Móglaí Bap – lead vocals (tracks 2–9, 11–14)
- Mo Chara – lead vocals (2–5, 7–13)
- DJ Próvaí – lead vocals (2, 4–7)

=== Additional contributors ===
- Dan Carey – production, mixing
- Alexis Smith – engineering
- Christian Wright – mastering
- Tom Beard – photography
- Gianni Clifford – art direction, design
- Liam Toon – drums (1, 7, 8, 10, 12)
- Aoife Ní Riain – lead vocals (1)
- Brendán Ó Fiaich – lead vocals (1)
- Ciarán Bhéin – lead vocals (1)
- Gearóid Ó Cairealláin – lead vocals (1)
- Manchán Magan – lead vocals (1)
- Róis – lead vocals (1)
- Fawzi – lead vocals (4)
- Holly Whitaker – synthesiser (11)
- Radie Peat – lead vocals (13)
- Kae Tempest – lead vocals (14)

== Charts ==
Chart performance for Fenian
Chart (2026)	Peak position
Australian Albums (ARIA)	7
Australian Hip Hop/R&B Albums (ARIA)	1
Belgian Albums (Ultratop Flanders)	18
Belgian Albums (Ultratop Wallonia)	49
Dutch Albums (Album Top 100)	39
French Albums (SNEP)	124
French Rock & Metal Albums (SNEP)	5
Irish Albums (Official Charts)	1
Irish Independent Albums (IRMA)	1
New Zealand Albums (RMNZ)	27
Scottish Albums (Official Charts)	1
Swedish Physical Albums (Sverigetopplistan)	13
Swiss Albums (Schweizer Hitparade)	56
UK Albums (Official Charts)	2
UK Independent Albums (Official Charts)	1
UK R&B Albums (Official Charts)	1
US Top Album Sales (Billboard)	27
