= List of films about bands =

Popular music and motion pictures have been linked since the dawn of the talkies and The Jazz Singer (1927). While numerous films in the intervening years have featured popular music in their sound tracks, and many have profiled solo artists, the list of films about popular bands is much shorter. The following are significant theatrical films that tell the stories of real or imagined musical groups.

== List of motion pictures about music bands (real or fictional) ==
Year	Film/Title	Director(s)	Cast/Leads	Notes
1954	The Glenn Miller Story	Anthony Mann	James Stewart; June Allyson	The film tells the story of the Glenn Miller Orchestra and big band leader Glenn Miller (1904–1944) (James Stewart) from his early days in the music business in 1929 through to his 1944 death when the airplane he was flying on was lost over the English Channel during World War II. The film features ten songs performed by the Glenn Miller Orchestra.
1956	Rock Around the Clock	Fred F. Sears	Bill Haley & His Comets; Alan Freed	Considered the first true rock and roll feature film, it is a highly fictionalized account of the origins of rock. The film features several major acts of the day, including The Platters, but largely focuses on the success of Haley and his band, whose single "Rock Around the Clock" is widely considered to be the first rock and roll hit.
1964	A Hard Day's Night	Richard Lester	The Beatles	Several days in the lives of the Beatles.
1966	Charlie Is My Darling	Peter Whitehead	The Rolling Stones	The first documentary film about the Rolling Stones, shot during the band's tour of Ireland in September 1965. A restored edition, with additional material, was released theatrically in 2012.
1970	Let It Be	Neil Aspinall	The Beatles; Billy Preston	A documentary about The Beatles rehearsing and recording songs for the album Let It Be, it was filmed in January 1969. The film features an unannounced rooftop concert by the group, their last performance in public. Released just after the album, it was the final original Beatles release.
1970	Gimme Shelter	Albert and David Maysles; Charlotte Zwerin	The Rolling Stones	A documentary film chronicling the last weeks of The Rolling Stones' 1969 US tour which culminated in the disastrous Altamont Free Concert. The film is named after "Gimme Shelter", the lead track from the group's album Let It Bleed (1969).
1971	200 Motels	Frank Zappa, Tony Palmer	The Mothers of Invention, Theodore Bikel, Keith Moon, Ringo Starr	A surreal and comic montage of loosely linked scenes, sketches, visual effects, and animation based on the theme of a touring band and the madness of life on the road. The film also features the Royal Philharmonic Orchestra performing music composed and orchestrated by Frank Zappa.
1975	Slade in Flame	Richard Loncraine	Slade; Tom Conti; Alan Lake	Film starring the British rock band Slade. The film charts the history of "Flame", a fictitious group in the late 1960s who are picked up by a marketing company and taken to the top, only to break up at their zenith. Described as the "Citizen Kane of rock musicals" by BBC film critic Mark Kermode, the film went on to achieve critical acclaim years after the mixed feelings on its original release.
1977	ABBA: The Movie	Lasse Hallström	ABBA; Robert Hughes	Largely filmed during ABBA's 1977 Australian tour, the film is a record of a pop band at the peak of its global chart success. It was the first English-language feature directed by future Academy Award nominee Hallström, who also directed most of the band's pioneering music videos. He is also credited as writer, though he has admitted that much of the story, involving a radio reporter trying to land an interview with the band, was mostly improvised on the fly. The film features 19 live performances including one song, "Get on the Carousel", that has never been officially released on any other medium.
1978	All You Need Is Cash	Eric Idle; Gary Weis	The Ruttles	A made-for-television mockumentary of the fictitious band The Ruttles - a parody of The Beatles.
1978	Kiss Meets the Phantom of the Park	Gordon Hessler	Kiss	In this made-for-television film, Kiss use their superpowers to battle an evil inventor and to save a California amusement park from destruction.
1978	The Last Waltz	Martin Scorsese	The Band	Arranged by travel-weary Robbie Robertson as a farewell concert for The Band. Containing comments by the band members and a host of notable guest performers associated with The Band, it contains concert footage and interviews taped both upon the occasion and afterward. The film drew controversy in part, as the other bandmates did not share Robertson's eagerness to part. Other issues, according to Levon Helm, involved the lack of visibility of The Band itself, drug use both on set, (including by Scorsese and musicians ostensibly affecting the quality of the film), and Helm felt the film portrayed Robertson the key player in a star role, minimizing what appeared to him as the importance of the other bandmates and their contributions.
1978	Sgt. Pepper's Lonely Hearts Club Band	Michael Schultz	Peter Frampton; The Bee Gees	The film uses the music of The Beatles to tell the story of a band as they wrangle with the music industry and battle evil forces bent on stealing their instruments and corrupting their hometown of Heartland.
1978	The Buddy Holly Story	Steve Rash	Gary Busey; Don Stroud	The story of the life and career of the early rock and roll singer, from his meteoric rise to stardom, to his marriage and untimely death.
1979	Rock 'n' Roll High School	Allan Arkush	Ramones; P.J. Soles	A musical comedy about a high school girl and her quest to meet her rock heroes, The Ramones.
1979	Baby Snakes	Frank Zappa, Bruce Bickford	Frank Zappa & band (Terry Bozzio, Adrian Belew), fans, and audiences.	A concert film augmented with backstage footage, audience antics and interactions, and stop motion clay animation.
1980	The Blues Brothers	John Landis	John Belushi; Dan Aykroyd	Paroled convict Jake and his brother Elwood, set out on "a mission from God" to save the Catholic orphanage in which they were raised from foreclosure. To do so, they must reunite their R&B band and organize a performance to earn $5,000 needed to pay the orphanage's property tax bill.
1981	Menudo: La Pelicula	Alfredo Anzola	Menudo; Marisela Buitrago	Puerto Rican boy band Menudo is on a Venezuelan nationwide tour. They encounter fictionalized situations through the tour, interloped with images of the band performing at real concerts.
1982	Ladies and Gentlemen, The Fabulous Stains	Lou Adler	Diane Lane; Laura Dern	A cult classic starring about three teenage girls who form a punk rock band.
1982	On Top	Ágúst Guðmundsson	Stuðmenn; Grýlurnar	An Icelandic musical comedy about the rivalry between the two bands.
1983	Eddie and the Cruisers	Martin Davidson	Tom Berenger; Ellen Barkin; Michael Pare	In the 1960s, a New Jersey rock band rises to fame but right before their second album comes out, the master recordings and their lead singer Eddie Wilson, mysteriously disappear. Twenty years later, a reporter investigates.
1984	Purple Rain	Albert Magnoli	Prince; Apollonia Kotero	A singer with a trouble past, the Kid (Prince) is a Minneapolis musician on the rise with his band, The Revolution. While trying to avoid making the same mistakes as his father, the Kid navigates the music scene and a rocky relationship with a captivating singer. But a rival musician, Morris (Morris Day), looks to steal the Kid's spotlight—and his girl.
1984	Stop Making Sense	Jonathan Demme	Talking Heads	Concert film of Talking Heads shot over three nights at the Hollywood Pantages Theatre.
1984	This Is Spinal Tap	Rob Reiner	Michael McKean; Christopher Guest	A famous "mockumentary" about a heavy metal band trying to make a comeback while being followed around by a filmmaker.
1986	Sid and Nancy	Alex Cox	Gary Oldman; Chloe Webb	(Also known as Sid and Nancy: Love Kills) A 1986 British film which portrays the life of Sid Vicious, bassist of the seminal punk rock band the Sex Pistols. It stars Oldman as Vicious and Webb as his girlfriend, Nancy Spungen. The movie chronicles the lives of the couple and their early deaths.
1987	La Bamba	Luis Valdez	Lou Diamond Phillips; Esai Morales; Rosanna DeSoto	Biographical story of the rise from nowhere of early rock and roll singer Ritchie Valens who died at age 17 in a plane crash with Buddy Holly and the Big Bopper.
1987	Rock 'n' Roll Nightmare	John Fasano	Jon Mikl Thor	The rock band Triton travels to a remote farmhouse to rehearse only to be attacked by an evil presence there.
1988	Rattle and Hum	Phil Joanou	U2	Documentary film featuring performances and interviews with U2.
1988	Vicious Lips	Albert Pyun	Dru-Anne Perry; Gina Calabrese	Film about an all-female band that has to travel across the galaxy to play a gig.
1988	Satisfaction	Joan Freeman	Justine Bateman; Liam Neeson; Julia Roberts	Teenage band The Mystery is hired as the house band for a summer at a Florida bar. Lead singer Jennie Lee falls in love with the owner of the bar, and they have to choose between fame and friendship.
1989	Eddie and the Cruisers II: Eddie Lives!	Jean-Claude Lord	Michael Pare; Matthew Laurance	After disappearing twenty years earlier, the music of rock star and lead singer Eddie Wilson of Eddie and the Cruisers suddenly becomes popular once again when a mysterious recording of Eddie is found.
1991	The Commitments	Alan Parker	Robert Arkins; Colm Meaney	A film adaptation of the novel of the same name by Roddy Doyle, which tells the story of some unemployed Dubliners who form a soul band.
1991	The Doors	Oliver Stone	Val Kilmer; Meg Ryan	Biographical film about the 1960s rock band The Doors, focusing primarily on the life of Jim Morrison.
1994	Airheads	Michael Lehmann	Brendan Fraser; Steve Buscemi	In a desperate attempt to gain radio airplay for their demo, a would-be rock band take a local radio station hostage until their songs are played on the air.
1994	Backbeat	Iain Softley	Stephen Dorff; Ian Hart; Sheryl Lee	It chronicles the early days of The Beatles in Hamburg, focusing on the relationship between Stuart Sutcliffe and John Lennon, and also with Sutcliffe's German girlfriend Astrid Kirchherr.
1996	That Thing You Do!	Tom Hanks	Tom Everett Scott; Liv Tyler	In the 1960s, The Wonders rise to fame for a brief while before ultimately becoming a one-hit wonder.
1997	Bandits	Katja von Garnier	Katja Riemann; Jasmin Tabatabai	A German film about four female convicts who start a band, and then escape prison. While on the run, the heroines perform concerts and attain fame as a rock band.
1997	Comedian Harmonists	Joseph Vilsmaier	Heinrich Schafmeister; Max Tidof; Ulrich Noethen; Heino Ferch; Ben Becker; Kai Wiesinger	Biographical film about the band with the same name who were popular in the Weimar Republic, but had to end their career when the Nazis came to power.
1997	Spice World	Bob Spiers	Spice Girls	A film about the lead up to a concert at the Royal Albert Hall as the Spice Girls deal with a smear campaign by a newspaper CEO.
1999	Detroit Rock City	Adam Rifkin	Kiss; Edward Furlong; Sam Huntington; Giuseppe Andrews; James DeBello; Lin Shaye	A film about a group of four Kiss fans in a Kiss tribute band called Mystery and their struggle to see a Kiss concert in Detroit.
2000	Almost Famous	Cameron Crowe	Patrick Fugit; Kate Hudson	Semi-autobiographical story of writer and director Cameron Crowe's life as a teenage journalist already working for Rolling Stone magazine while still in High School.
2001	Josie and the Pussycats	Harry Elfont	Rachael Leigh Cook; Tara Reid; Rosario Dawson	Loosely based upon the Archie comic of the same name and the Hanna-Barbera cartoon, the film is about a young all-female band that signs a record contract with a major record label, only to discover that the company does not have the musicians' best interests at heart.
2001	Rock Star	Stephen Herek	Mark Wahlberg; Jennifer Aniston	Based loosely on the real story of the replacement lead singer for the band Judas Priest. In the film, the band is the fictional "Steel Dragon" and the character is Chris Cole (Mark Wahlberg). Cole's life metamorphoses when he goes from singer of a Steel Dragon tribute band to the actual lead singer of Steel Dragon, replacing his idol in the process.
2001	Hysteria: The Def Leppard Story	Robert Mandel	Nick Bagnall; Karl Geary; Adam MacDonald	A dramatization of the early years of the glam metal band Def Leppard, the group faces both success and personal tragedies such as drummer, Rick Allen losing his arm in a car accident and guitarist Steve Clark's alcohol addiction.
2002	Garage Days	Alex Proyas	Kick Gurry; Maya Stange	The story of a young Sydney, Australia, garage band desperately trying to make it big in the competitive world of rock and roll.
2002	Rock My World	Sidney J. Furie	Peter O'Toole; Joan Plowright	The rock band Global Heresy bursts onto the scene then their frontman disappears on the eve of a European tour.
2003	School of Rock	Richard Linklater	Jack Black; Joan Cusack; Mike White; Sarah Silverman	Heavy metal guitar player Dewey Finn voted out of his own band therefore later impersonates a substitute teacher for Advanced Placement kids for money. To compete in Battle of the Bands with his former mates, Dewey teaches his students to be his rock band after discovering the kids are talented instrumentalists.
2003	Prey for Rock & Roll	Alex Steyermark	Gina Gershon; Drea de Matteo; Lori Petty	Jacki is the lead singer of the all-female punk band Clam Dandy. On the verge of turning 40, she decides to give the band one last shot at stardom before retiring her dreams.
2004	Metallica: Some Kind of Monster	Joe Berlinger; Bruce Sinofsky	Metallica	A documentary showing the recording process of Metallica's eighth studio album St. Anger (2003).
2004	Dig!	Ondi Timoner	The Dandy Warhols; The Brian Jonestown Massacre	A documentary contrasting the success of the two bands.
2005	Linda Linda Linda	Nobuhiro Yamashita	Bae Doona; Aki Maeda; Yu Kashii; Shiori Sekine	Four teenagers form a band to cover songs by the Japanese punk rock band the Blue Hearts.
2006	Dreamgirls	Bill Condon	Jamie Foxx; Jennifer Hudson; Eddie Murphy	Academy Award–winning, critically acclaimed story about an all-female African-American singing group in the 1960s starring Beyonce Knowles.
2006	BoyTown	Kevin Carlin	Glenn Robbins; Mick Molloy	Australian comedic film about BoyTown, a fictional boy band of the 1980s who leave their terrible and bad-paying lives for one last crack at the big time. They return to the stage with slightly older fans and slightly larger pants to complete some unfinished business.
2006	Tenacious D in The Pick of Destiny	Liam Lynch	Jack Black; Kyle Gass	American fictional comedic film about real life rock band Tenacious D, on their quest to obtain a historic guitar plectrum that promises them fame and fortune.
2007	Control	Anton Corbijn	Sam Riley; Samantha Riley	A film about the English 1976 band Joy Division. Focus on lead singer Ian Curtis. Shows how the band rose to success and the depression that Ian had which eventually led to his death. The film is shot completely in black and white.
2008	Rock On!!	Abhishek Kapoor	Arjun Rampal; Shahana Goswami	A Bollywood film about a 1990s grunge band who break up out of pressures of conforming to major label constraints. Ten years later, the estranged members meet up again by chance, eventually reforming the band and their friendships.
2008	The Rocker	Peter Cattaneo	Rainn Wilson; Christina Applegate	A failed musician goes on tour with his nephew's band after one of their songs goes viral.
2008	Shine a Light	Martin Scorsese	The Rolling Stones; Jack White	A film documenting The Rolling Stones' 2006 Beacon Theatre performance on their Bigger Bang tour. The Scorsese film also includes archive footage from the band's career and marked the first utilisation by Scorsese of digital cinematography for his films with it being used for the backstage sequences.
2008	Anvil! The Story of Anvil	Sacha Gervasi	Anvil; Slash	A documentary about the Canadian heavy metal band Anvil and the lives of its members after they fail to hit it big in the 1980s.
2009	Bandslam	Todd Graff	Aly Michalka; Lisa Kudrow	After moving to a new school, previously unpopular music enthusiast Will teams up in an unlikely pairing with former cheerleader Charlotte to form a rock group and perform in Battle of the Bands competition called "Bandslam".
2010	The Runaways	Floria Sigismondi	Dakota Fanning; Kristen Stewart	Film about the 1970s all-female rock band The Runaways, based on the book Neon Angel: A Memoir of a Runaway by the band's original lead vocalist Cherie Currie.
2010	Scott Pilgrim vs. the World	Edgar Wright	Michael Cera; Mary Elizabeth Winstead; Kieran Culkin; Chris Evans; Anna Kendrick	Based on the graphic novel series Scott Pilgrim by Bryan Lee O'Malley. A 22-year-old bass player for unsuccessful indie garage band Sex Bob-Omb is trying to win a competition to get a record deal, while also battling the seven evil exes of his new girlfriend Ramona Flowers.
2011	Killing Bono	Nick Hamm	Ben Barnes; Robert Sheehan; Martin McCann; Pete Postlethwaite	A 2011 British-Irish comedy film directed by Nick Hamm, based on Neil McCormick's memoir Killing Bono: I Was Bono's Doppelgänger (2003).
2012	The Sapphires	Wayne Blair	Chris O'Dowd; Deborah Mailman	It's 1968, and four young, talented Australian Aboriginal girls learn about love, friendship and war when their girl group The Sapphires entertain the US troops in Vietnam.
2012	Not Fade Away	David Chase	John Magaro; Jack Huston; James Gandolfini; Bella Heathcote	Set in suburban New Jersey in the 1960s, a group of friends form a rock band and try to make it big in the music business.
2013	CBGB	Randall Miller	Alan Rickman; Malin Akerman; Justin Bartha	A biographical drama of CBGB founder Hilly Kristal and the beginning of the New York underground punk movement. The film dramatizes the performances of Blondie, The Ramones, Dead Boys, Iggy Pop, Patti Smith and more.
2013	The Stone Roses: Made of Stone	Shane Meadows	The Stone Roses	The film follows the band reforming in 2012 after a 16-year split, as they practise for their reunion tour.
2014	Jersey Boys	Clint Eastwood	John Lloyd Young; Christopher Walken; Vincent Piazza; Erich Bergen	The story of four young men who formed the rock band The Four Seasons.
2016	Attack of Life: The Bang Tango Movie	Drew Fortier	Bang Tango; Dee Snider; Riki Rachtman; Howard Benson	A documentary about the 1980s hard rock band Bang Tango and their over 20 year long decline into the present day.
2016	Popstar: Never Stop Never Stopping	Akiva Schaffer; Jorma Taccone	Andy Samberg; Akiva Schaffer; Jorma Taccone	Comedy about fictional pop rap group The Style Boyz and rise and fall of one member's solo career.
2016	Sing Street	John Carney	Ferdia Walsh-Peelo; Lucy Boynton; Jack Reynor; Kelly Thornton	Fictional story about a young man who forms a band to impress a girl in 1980s Ireland.
2018	Bohemian Rhapsody	Bryan Singer	Rami Malek; Lucy Boynton; Gwilym Lee	The story of the legendary rock band Queen and lead singer Freddie Mercury, leading up to their famous performance at Live Aid (1985).
2018	Lords of Chaos	Jonas Åkerlund	Rory Culkin; Emory Cohen; Jack Kilmer	A horror film about the black metal band Mayhem, guitarist Euronymous and their dark past.
2018	Her Smell	Alex Ross Perry	Elisabeth Moss; Cara Delevingne	A soundtrack heavy movie about a self-destructive punk rocker who struggles with sobriety while trying to recapture the creative inspiration that led her band to success.
2019	The Dirt	Jeff Tremaine	Douglas Booth; Colson Baker; Daniel Webber; Iwan Rheon	A biographical musical comedy-drama about the glam metal band Mötley Crüe, featuring famous events in the band's history and their numerous struggles as a band.
2022	Studio 666	B. J. McDonnell	Foo Fighters; Whitney Cummings; Will Forte	A comedy horror film featuring rock band Foo Fighters in a fictional supernatural setting during their 10th album recording.
2023	Girl You Know It's True	Simon Verhoeven	Tijan Njie; Elan Ben Ali; Matthias Schweighöfer; Bella Dayne	A biographical film about the German duo Milli Vanilli, who caused an infamous scandal when it was revealed that the vocals of their songs were provided by other singers.
2024	Kneecap	Rich Peppiatt	Kneecap; Michael Fassbender	A comedy drama film depicting the rise of the Irish hip-hop group with the same name.
2025	KPop Demon Hunters	Maggie Kang Chris Appelhans	Arden Cho May Hong Ji-young Yoo	An animated musical Urban fantasy about KPop girl band, Huntrix, and their double life as demon hunters.
2025	Spinal Tap II: The End Continues	Rob Reiner	Christopher Guest Michael McKean Harry Shearer	The follow up to the original 1984 mockumentary about the fictional heavy metal band reuniting for one last show.
