= British Independent Film Award for Best Joint Lead Performance =

British film award

- Awarded for: Best Joint Leading Performance
- Country: United Kingdom
- Presented by: BIFA
- First award: 2022
- Currently held by: Tim Key and Tom Basden – The Ballad of Wallis Island (2025)
- Website: www.bifa.film

The British Independent Film Award for Best Joint Lead Performance is an annual award given by the British Independent Film Awards (BIFA). The award was first presented in the 2022 ceremony. Letitia Wright and Tamara Lawrance were the first recipients of the award for their work in The Silent Twins.

From 1998 to 2021, leading performances were rewarded with two categories separated by gender: Best Performance by an Actor and Best Performance by an Actress. The change was made in 2022, creating this category alongside Best Lead Performance and Best Supporting Performance.

== Winners and nominees ==
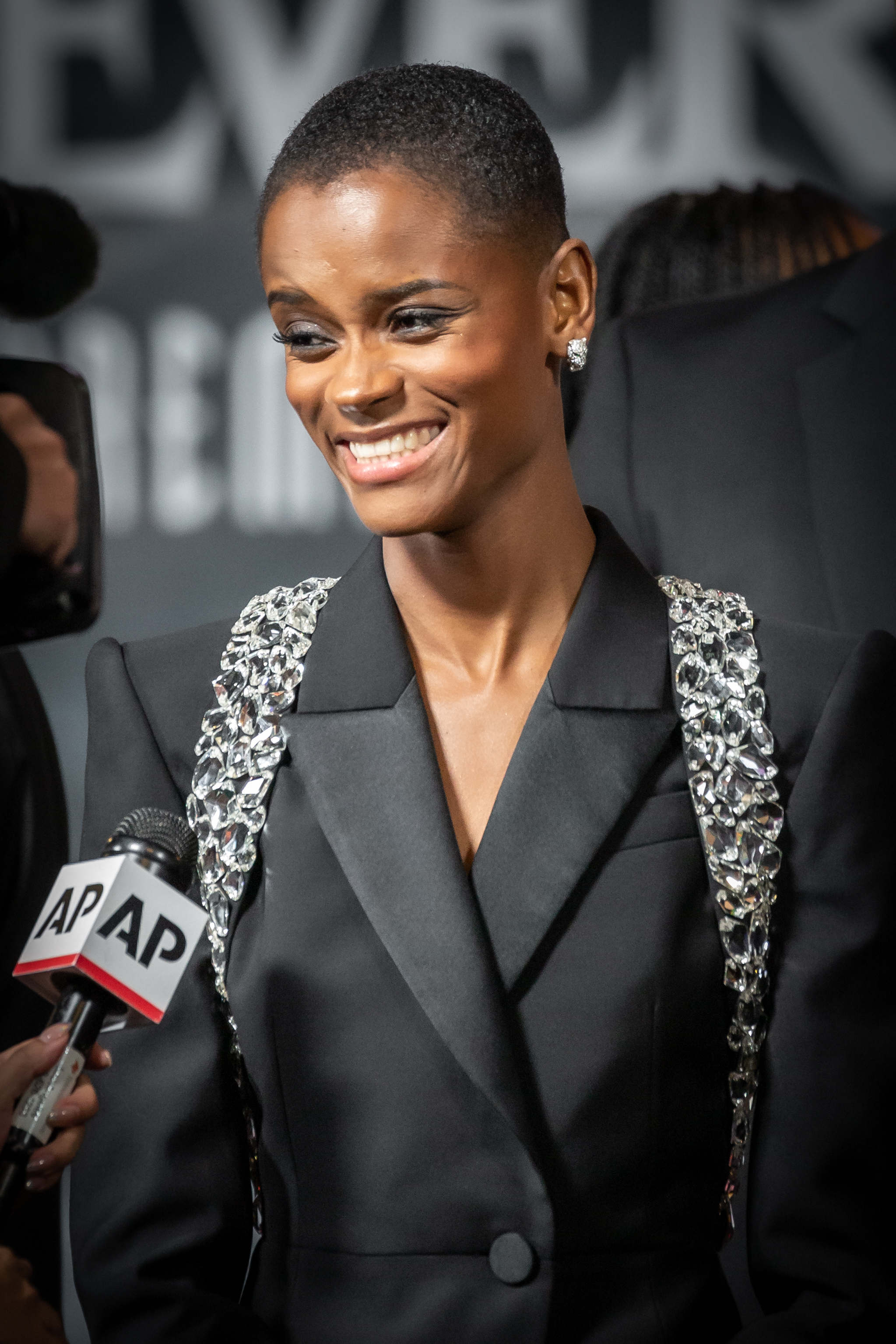
Letitia Wright won for The Silent Twins (2022).

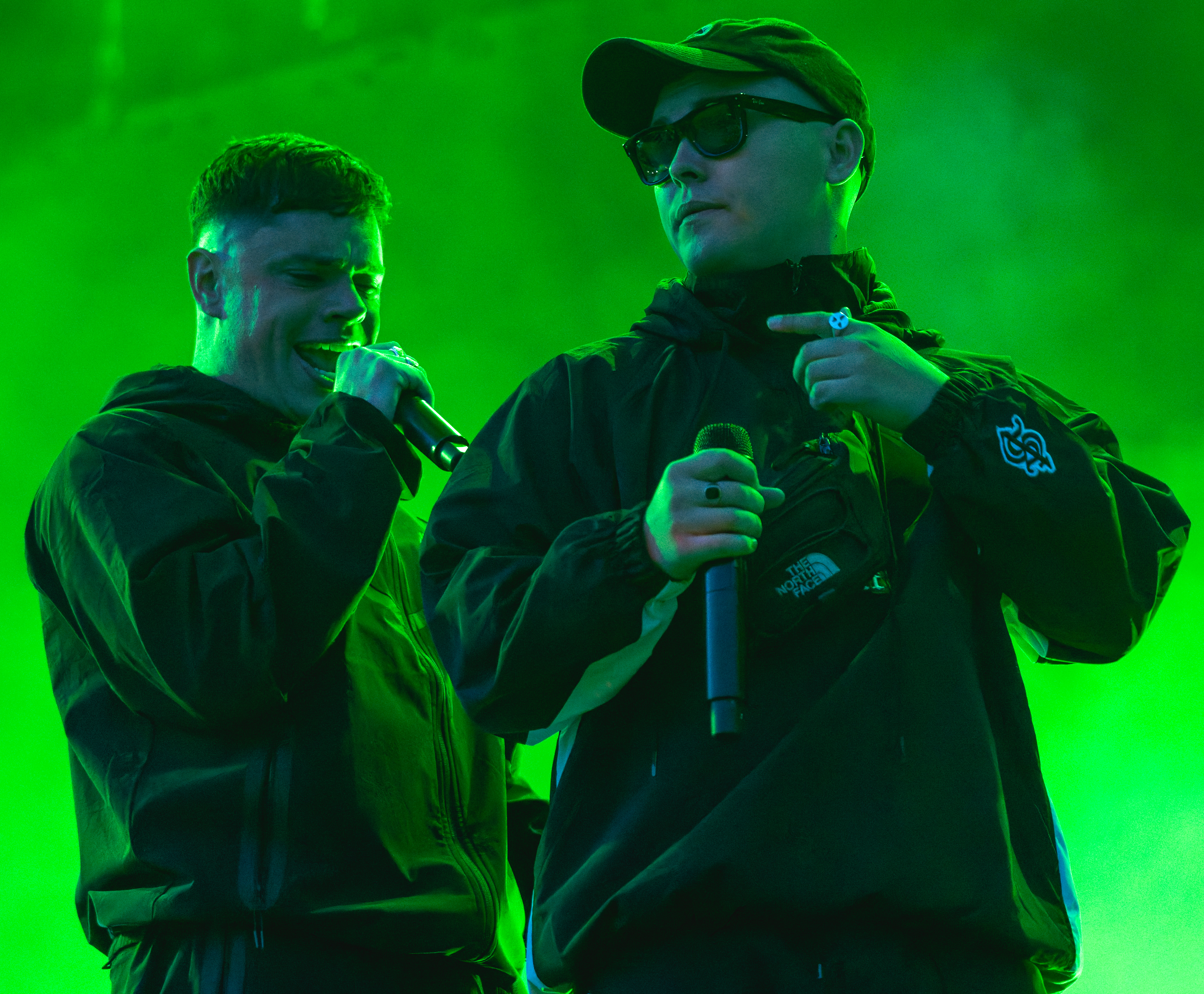
Kneecap (members Móglaí Bap and Mo Chara pictured) won for Kneecap (2024).

=== 2020s ===
Year	Performer	Film	Character
2022 (25th)	Letitia Wright and Tamara Lawrance	The Silent Twins	June and Jennifer Gibbons
2022 (25th)	Frankie Corio and Paul Mescal	Aftersun	Sophie and Calum
2022 (25th)	Daryl McCormack and Emma Thompson	Good Luck to You, Leo Grande	Leo Grande / Connor and Nancy Stokes / Susan Robinson
2022 (25th)	Jessie Buckley and Rory Kinnear	Men	Harper Marlowe and Geoffrey
2023 (26th)	Nathan Stewart-Jarrett and George MacKay	Femme	Jules and Preston
2023 (26th)	Lola Campbell and Harris Dickinson	Scrapper	Georgie and Jason
2023 (26th)	David Jonsson and Vivian Oparah	Rye Lane	Dom and Yas
2024 (27th)	Liam Óg Ó hAnnaidh, Naoise Ó Cairealláin and JJ Ó Dochartaigh	Kneecap	Mo Chara, Móglaí Bap and DJ Próvaí
2024 (27th)	Joseph Quinn and Saura Lightfoot-Leon	Hoard	Michael and Maria
2024 (27th)	Katy O'Brian and Kristen Stewart	Love Lies Bleeding	Jackie Cleaver and Louise "Lou" Langston
2024 (27th)	Jason Patel and Ben Hardy	Unicorns	Aysha and Luke
2025 (28th)	Tim Key and Tom Basden	The Ballad of Wallis Island	Charles Heath and Herb McGwyer
2025 (28th)	Ebada Hassan and Safiyya Ingar	Brides	Doe and Muna
2025 (28th)	Andrea Riseborough and Brenda Blethyn	Dragonfly	Colleen and Elsie

== See also ==
- BAFTA Award for Best Actor in a Leading Role
- BAFTA Award for Best Actress in a Leading Role
