= Arkins =

Arkins is a surname. Notable people with the surname include:

- Guy Arkins (1888–1980), Australian politician
- Robert Arkins, Irish musician and actor
- Vinny Arkins (born 1970), Irish footballer
