= Fine Art (Kneecap album) =

Studio album by Kneecap
- Released: 14 June 2024
- Studio: Bell Brothers (London); The Clinic (Dublin)
- Genre: Hip-hop; electronic; punk rap
- Length: 37:46
- Language: English; Irish
- Label: Heavenly
- Producer: Toddla T

Kneecap chronology
3CAG (2018)	Fine Art (2024)	Kneecap: Music from the Motion Picture (2024)

Singles from Fine Art
- 1. "Better Way to Live" Released: 15 November 2023; 2. "Sick in the Head" Released: 20 February 2024; 3. "Fine Art" Released: 27 March 2024; 4. "Love Making" Released: 1 May 2024

Fine Art is the debut studio album by Irish Hip-hop trio Kneecap, released on 14 June 2024 through Heavenly Recordings. It is produced by Toddla T and includes guest appearances by Radie Peat, Grian Chatten, Nino, and Jelani Blackman. The album received positive reviews from critics and debuted at number two in Ireland.

== Critical reception ==
Professional ratings
Aggregate scores
Source	Rating
Metacritic	79/100
Review scores
Source	Rating
AllMusic	3.5/5 stars
Clash	6/10
DIY	5/5 stars
The Irish Times	5/5 stars
Mojo	4/5 stars
NME	5/5 stars
RTÉ	4/5 stars
The Skinny	4/5 stars
Uncut	7/10
Under the Radar	6/10 stars

Fine Art received a score of 79 out of 100 on review aggregator Metacritic based on eight critics' reviews, which the website categorised as "generally favourable" reception. Mojo opined that "the wild times end on a poignant, giddy high with 'Parful' – a house-y banger raving about everyday hedonism transcending sectarian violence – an irresistible distillation of Kneecap's peacetime party music". Uncut called it "overly indebted to its inspirations – among them Ghetts, Stormzy and the Streets – it may be, but the stroppy 'I Bhfiacha Linne' and 'Rhino Ket', a moody techno/dancehall hybrid, are hard to deny".

Andrew Trendell of NME gave Fine Art a full five stars, praising the album's rave qualities and for keeping the Irish language alive, adding that it "couldn’t sound any more alive...That’s power – and Kneecap have it". DIY's Lisa Wright described the album as "in its own warped way, as its title suggests: a fully-immersive, conceptual production that, much like their recent Sundance award-winning biopic, is far, far too clever to just be the work of three miscreants". Chris Sneddon of The Skinny found that it "has its ups and downs, it can be deep, it can be controversial, but in the long run, it's a good laugh and a thumping good time" as well as "a banging collision of rap and rave music".

=== Year-end lists ===
Select 2024 year-end rankings for Fine Art
Publication/critic	Accolade	Rank	Ref.
The Line of Best Fit	Best Albums of the Year 2024	46	
Louder Than War	Top 100 Albums of 2024	44	
Mondo Sonoro	Best International Albums of 2024	48	
NME	50 Best Albums of 2024	13	
Rough Trade UK	Albums of the Year 2024	26	
The Skinny	20 Albums of 2024	4	
The Sunday Times	25 Best Albums of 2024	5	
The Telegraph	10 Best Albums of 2024	10	
Vogue	The 36 Best Albums of 2024	—N/a	

== Track listing ==
All lyrics are written by Kneecap; "Harrow Road" lyrics written with Jelani Blackman.

Fine Art track listing
No.	Title	Music	Length
1.	"3CAG" (featuring Radie Peat)	Kneecap; Radie Peat; Thomas Mackenzie Bell; Joe O'Donnell	3:08
2.	"Fine Art"	Kneecap	2:19
3.	"Interlude: Making Headlines"	Kneecap; Bell	0:27
4.	"I bhFiacha Linne"	Kneecap; Bell; Arveene Juthan; Andrew Barker; Graham Massey; Darren Partington; Martin Price	3:07
5.	"Interlude: Never Gets a Round"	Kneecap; Bell	0:24
6.	"I'm Flush"	Kneecap; Bell; Adrian McLeod	2:56
7.	"Interlude: State of Ya"	Kneecap; Bell	0:13
8.	"Better Way to Live" (featuring Grian Chatten)	Kneecap; Bell; McLeod	2:56
9.	"Sick in the Head"	Kneecap; Bell; McLeod	2:32
10.	"Love Making" (featuring Nino)	Kneecap; Bell	2:27
11.	"Interlude: Amhrán na Scadán"	Kneecap; Bell	0:24
12.	"Drug Dealin Pagans"	Kneecap; Bell	2:33
13.	"Interlude: Kneecap Chaps"	Kneecap; Bell	0:37
14.	"Harrow Road" (featuring Jelani Blackman)	Kneecap; Bell; Tom Coll; Nick Detnon	3:45
15.	"Parful"	Kneecap; Bell	3:19
16.	"Rhino Ket"	Kneecap; Bell	3:07
17.	"Interlude: Last Orders"	Kneecap; Bell	0:15
18.	"Way Too Much"	Kneecap; Bell; McLeod	3:17
Total length:			37:46

Fine Art (Remixes) track listing
No.	Title	Length
1.	"Parful" (David Holmes remix)	4:56
2.	"Better Way to Live" (featuring Grian Chatten; Sam Interface remix)	3:28
3.	"Better Way to Live" (featuring Grian Chatten; Sam Interface dub)	3:28
4.	"Sick in the Head" (Jonah Swilley remix)	2:42
Total length:		14:35

Notes

- On physical editions, the interludes do not include "Interlude" in the title and are listed as unnumbered tracks.
- "3CAG" contains a sample of "Caravan" by Joe O'Donnell.
- "I bhFiacha Linne" contains a sample of "Cübik" by 808 State.
- "Harrow Road" contains elements from "Creeper" by Nick Detnon.
- "Parful" contains excerpts from the film Dancing on Narrow Ground written and directed by Des Bell.
- A demo of "Glue Man" was included as a bonus track on digital downloads of the album during its first week of release.

== Personnel ==
Kneecap

- Móglaí Bap – vocals
- Mo Chara – vocals
- DJ Próvaí – vocals

Additional contributors

- Toddla T – production, mixing
- James Eager – engineering
- Tom Coll – drums ("I'm Flush", "Better Way to Live")
- Adrian McLeod – synthesizer, keyboards ("I'm Flush", "Way Too Much"); piano ("Better Way to Live", "Way Too Much"), synth bass, synth pad ("Better Way to Live"), bass ("Way Too Much")
- Grian Chatten – vocals ("Better Way to Live")
- Andy Nicholson – bass ("Better Way to Live")
- Steven Loughrin – flute ("Drug Dealin Pagans")
- Manchán Magan – guest vocals ("Drug Dealin Pagans")
- Lisa Canny – choir ("Way Too Much")
- Saara Kaldma – choir ("Way Too Much")
- Gertrud Aasaroht – choir ("Way Too Much")
- Tony McHugh – choir ("Way Too Much")
- Colin Andrews – choir ("Way Too Much")
- Aoife O'Dea – choir ("Way Too Much")

== Charts ==
Chart performance for Fine Art
Chart (2024)	Peak position
Irish Albums (Official Charts)	2
Scottish Albums (Official Charts)	3
UK Albums (Official Charts)	43
UK Independent Albums (Official Charts)	3
UK R&B Albums (Official Charts)	1
