= Móglaí Bap =

Irish rapper and activist (born 1993)

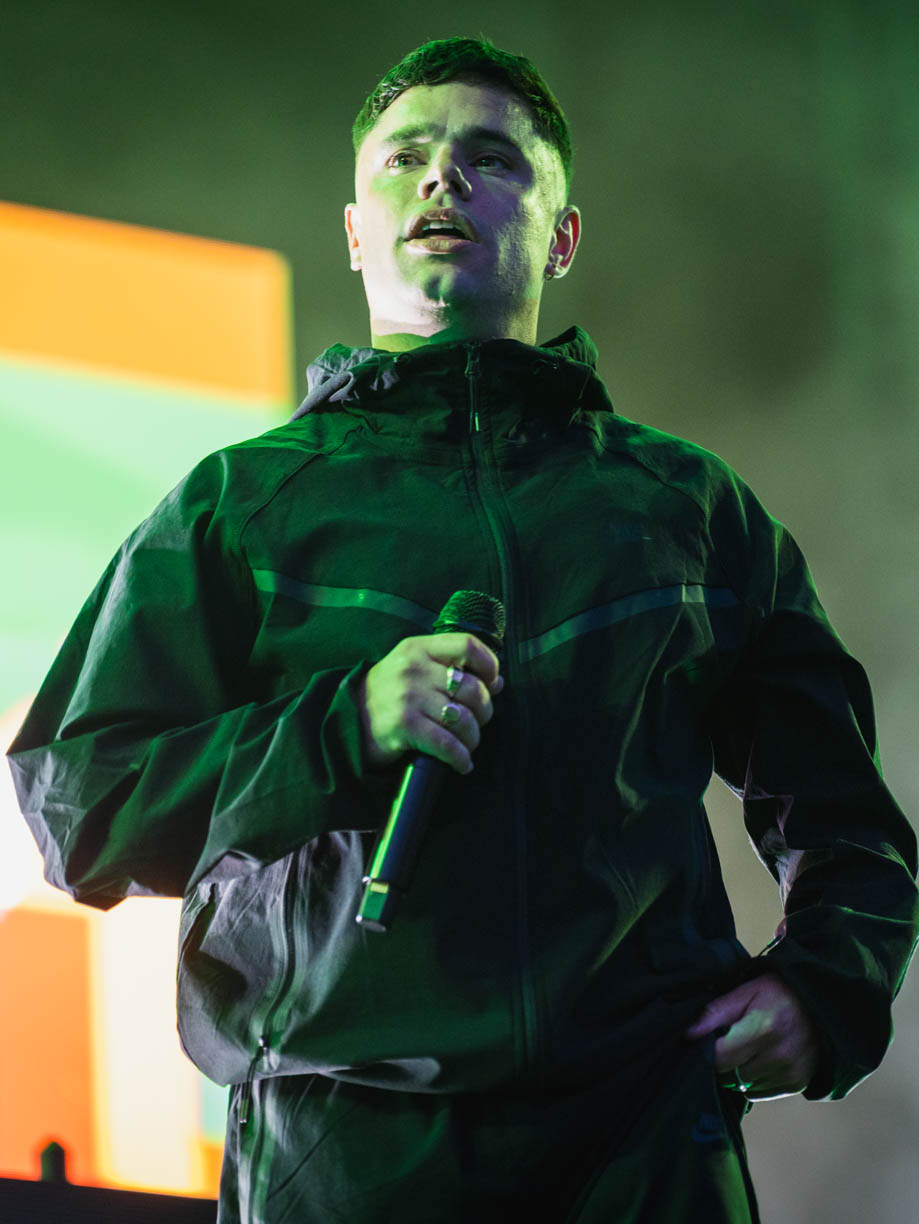
- Móglaí Bap in 2025

Background information
- Born: Naoise Iarla Ó Cairealláin; December 1993 (age 32)
- Genre: Hip hop
- Occupations: Rapper; actor; activist
- Years active: 2017–present
- Member of: Kneecap

Naoise Iarla Ó Cairealláin (born December 1993), better known by his stage name Móglaí Bap, is an Irish rapper, actor, and activist from Belfast, Northern Ireland. He is best known as a founding member of the hip hop trio Kneecap. He performs in both Irish and English; he is noted for his cultural and political advocacy.

== Early life ==
Móglaí Bap's stage name derives from the bowl haircut he had as a child, reminiscent of the character Mowgli from The Jungle Book.

He is the son of Gearóid Ó Cairealláin, a prominent activist in the Irish language movement who founded the daily newspaper Lá, the cultural centre Cultúrlann McAdam Ó Fiaich, and the Irish-language radio station Raidió Fáilte. Ó Cairealláin's mother was Irish language activist and musician Aoife Ní Riain, who was also a figure within the Irish language community. Originally from Dublin, she moved to Belfast in the 1980s, worked as a librarian at Belfast Central Library, presented a radio programme on Raidió Fáilte, and was active in traditional music. In 2020, she died by suicide, and the Kneecap song "MAM" is dedicated to her memory and discusses her mental health issues. In April 2026, the band released a single, accompanied by a 13 minute short film music video, titled “Irish Goodbye” in memory of his mother.

== Career ==
=== Music with Kneecap ===
In 2017, Móglaí Bap co-founded Kneecap with Mo Chara (Liam Óg Ó hAnnaidh) and DJ Próvaí (J.J. Ó Dochartaigh). Their debut single, "C.E.A.R.T.A.", was released in 2017, followed by their first studio album 3CAG (2018). A second album, Fine Art, was released in 2024.

The trio are known for their blend of Irish-language and English lyrics, politically charged performances, and activism around Irish republicanism, youth culture, and language rights.

=== Activism ===
Móglaí Bap and his bandmates are vocal advocates for the Irish language and for political expression. Their imagery, such as murals of burning police Land Rovers, has generated both acclaim and controversy. They have been credited with helping make the Irish language appear "trendy, cool, and sexy" among younger generations.

In 2024, Móglaí Bap began hosting charity runs in solidarity with Palestine. On a 10K run on 17 December 2025, he led hundreds of runners, including his brother Ainle, through Phoenix Park in Dublin. Outside Áras an Uachtaráin, he was greeted by Irish President Catherine Connolly. Ainle is the founder and director of the West Bank community gym ACLAÍ Palestine.

=== Acting ===
In 2024, Móglaí Bap starred as himself in the biographical comedy-drama film Kneecap, directed by Rich Peppiatt. The film premiered at the Sundance Film Festival and won the NEXT Audience Award. It later won several awards at the Galway Film Fleadh and was selected as Ireland's submission for the Academy Award for Best International Feature Film.

Móglaí Bap received a nomination for Best Lead Actor at the IFTA Awards and, with his bandmates, jointly won the British Independent Film Award for Best Joint Lead Performance.

== Filmography ==
Year	Title	Role
2024	Kneecap	Himself

== Awards ==
- Irish Film and Television Academy (IFTA) Award for Best Director (Kneecap, 2024; shared with cast and crew)
- BAFTA Award for Kneecap (2024; as cast member)

== See also ==
- Irish hip hop
