= DJ Próvaí =

Irish DJ, actor, and activist

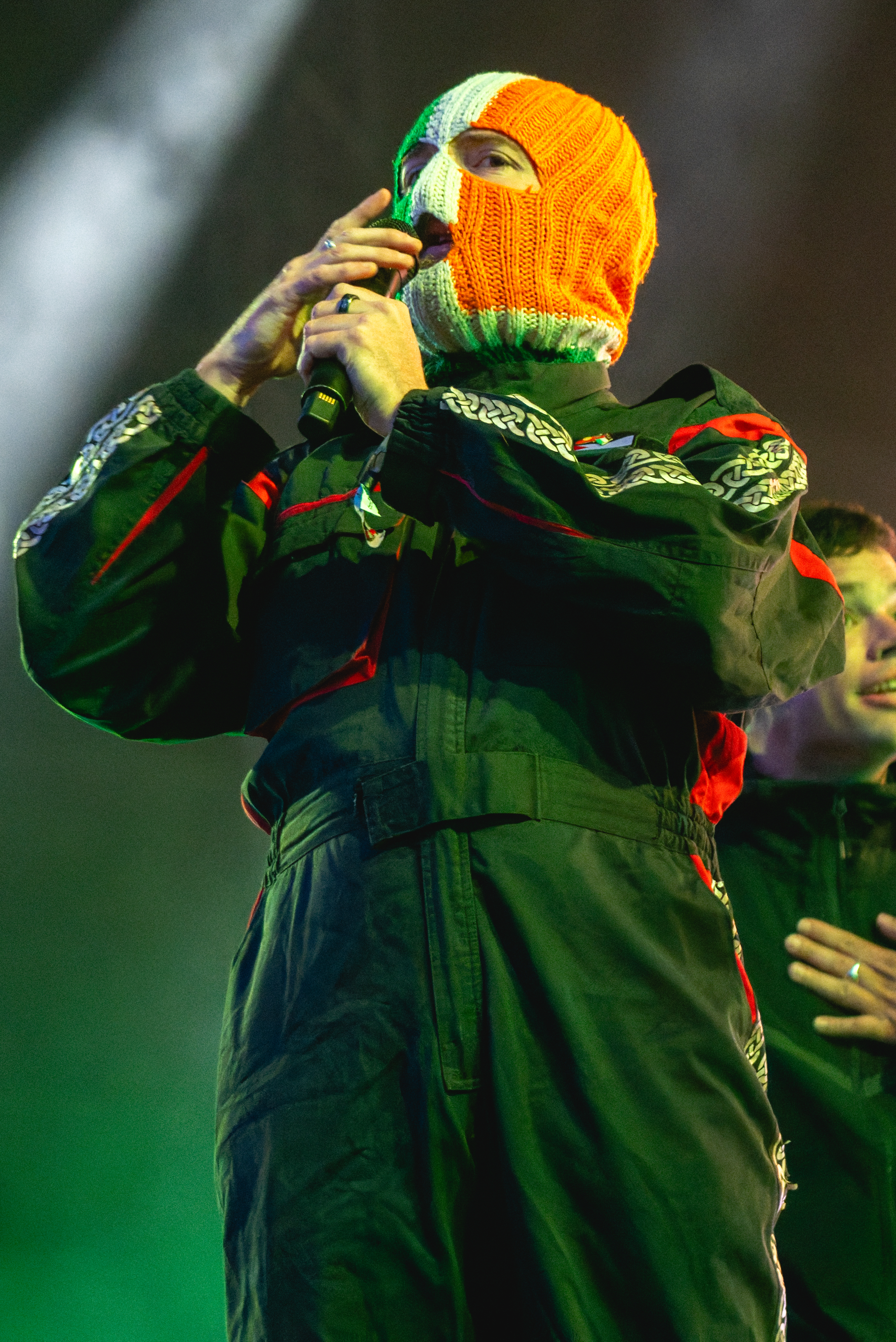
- DJ Próvaí in May 2025

Background information
- Born: Derry, Northern Ireland
- Occupations: DJ; actor; activist
- Years active: 2017–present
- Member of: Kneecap

James John "JJ" Ó Dochartaigh, known by his stage name DJ Próvaí, is an Irish DJ, actor and activist, best known as a founding member of the Irish-language hip hop trio Kneecap.

== Early life and teaching career ==
DJ Próvaí was born in Derry, Northern Ireland. Before his career in music, he worked as an Irish language teacher at a Catholic secondary school. He left the role in 2020 after a video circulated of him on stage, wearing a balaclava and exposing his buttocks painted with the slogan "Brits Out".

== Musical career with Kneecap ==
DJ Próvaí adopted his stage name referencing the Provisional IRA, and is known for wearing a balaclava in the colours of the Irish tricolour. He joined Kneecap in 2017 alongside Mo Chara (Liam Óg Ó hAnnaidh) and Móglaí Bap (Naoise Ó Cairealláin), contributing vocals and DJing to their Irish-language rap performances.

Kneecap released their debut single "C.E.A.R.T.A." in 2017, their first studio album 3CAG in 2018, and their second album Fine Art in 2024. Their lyrics fuse Irish and English with satire, political commentary, and working-class Belfast youth culture.

== Acting and film involvement ==
In 2024, DJ Próvaí appeared as himself in the biographical film Kneecap, co-written with director Rich Peppiatt. The film premiered at the Sundance Film Festival and won the NEXT Audience Award. It went on to win several awards at the Galway Film Fleadh and was selected as Ireland’s submission for the Academy Award for Best International Feature Film.

DJ Próvaí received a nomination for Best Lead Actor at the IFTA Awards and, with his bandmates, jointly won the British Independent Film Award for Best Joint Lead Performance.

== Other projects ==
In 2025, DJ Próvaí teamed up with visual artist Aches, to create an art piece for the international charity art project Music Shaped.

On 31 December, 2025, DJ Próvaí was featured in the TG4 documentary Cartlann Christy Moore, discussing Christy Moore's influence.

== Filmography ==
- Kneecap (2024) – as himself

== Awards ==
- Irish Film and Television Academy (IFTA) Award for Best Director (Kneecap, 2024; shared with cast and crew)
- BAFTA Award for Kneecap (2024; as cast member)

== See also ==
- Irish hip hop
