= King George V Memorial, Melbourne =

Memorial for King George V in Melbourne, Australia

Coordinates: 37.82427°S 144.97317°E

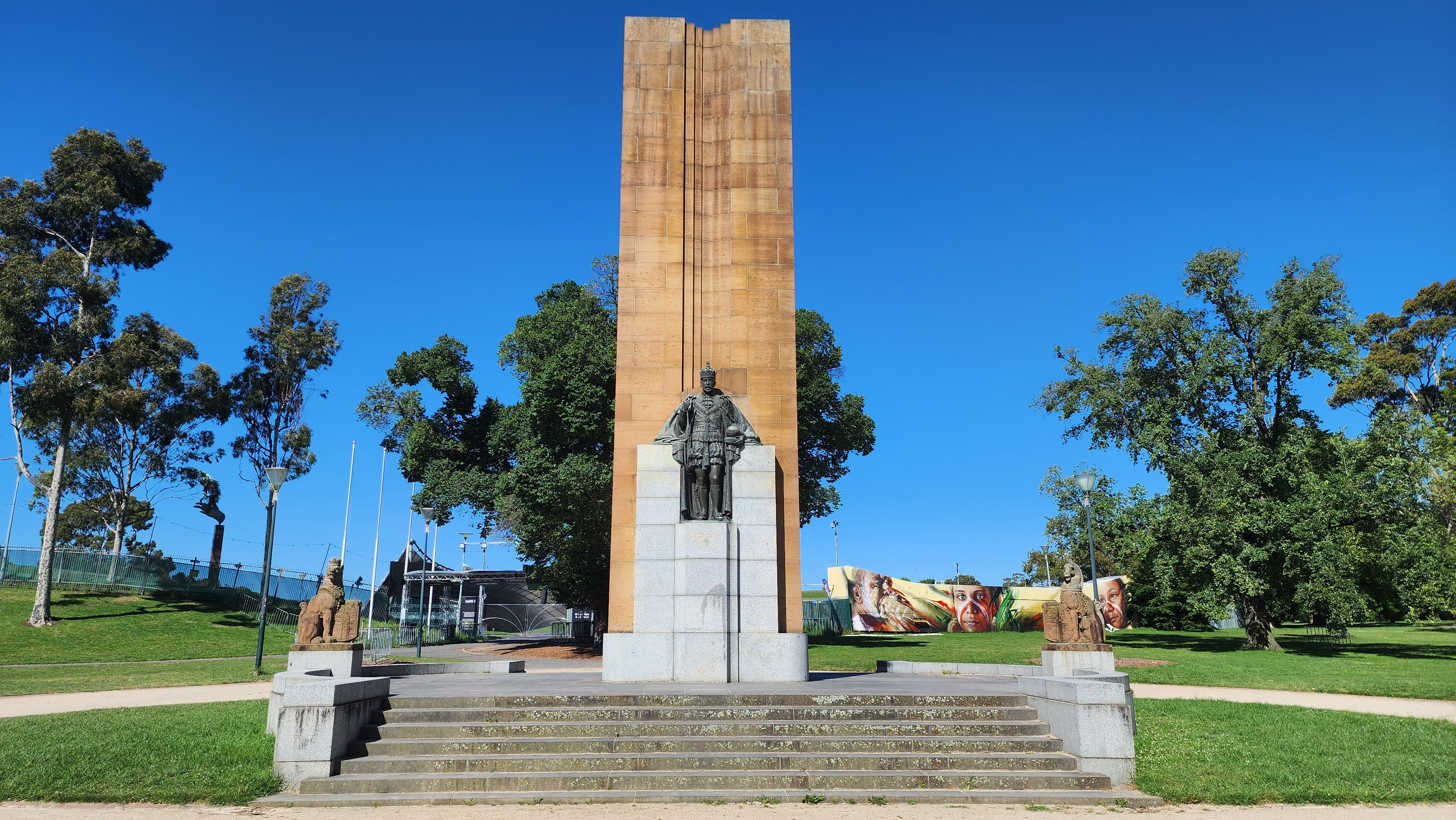
King George V on the eastern face

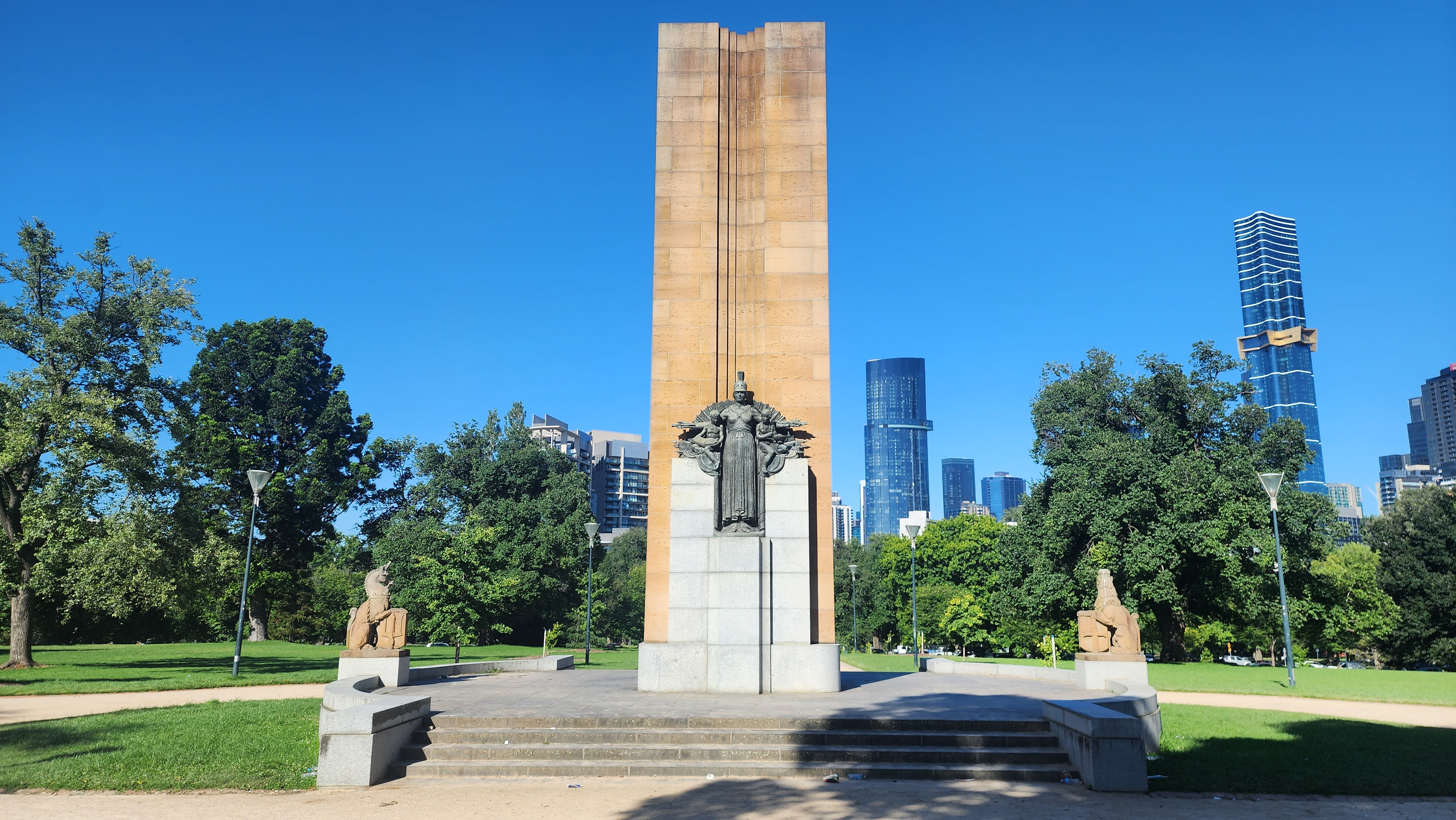
Britannia on the western face

The King George V Memorial is a memorial in Kings Domain in Melbourne, Australia. It stands nearby the Sidney Myer Music Bowl, and features bronze statues of King George V on its east side and Britannia on its west. Commissioned in 1936 and created by William Leslie Bowls and unveiled in June 1952 after its construction was delayed by World War II, it has been the subject of protest and vandalism, including the removal of the George V statue's head in 2024.

== Description ==
There are two bronze statues on the monument; on the east face stands King George V, wearing full garter robes and the Imperial State Crown, and holding his ceremonial sceptre and orb. His statue stood at 12 feet (3.7 m) and weighed 2.5 tonnes. The western face features a statue representing Maternal Britannia, who holds a cross in her hands as well as an olive branch, symbolising love and peace. Two children, who represent the Dominions and Colonies living in peace under British rule, are positioned next to her.

The statues are accompanied by sandstone and granite fluted columns, measuring 55 feet (17 m) at their highest, as well as two additional small sandstone heraldic statues of a lion and a unicorn on either side to the north and south respectively. These each hold a shield showing the armorial bearings of King George V. The monument is surrounded by bluestone paving slabs, with two sets of seven-step stairs on the west and east side.

== History ==
=== Creation ===
The memorial was created by artist Leslie Bowles. Following the death of George V in 1936, Bowles was commissioned for the monument in 1937 after submitting a design to the King George V Memorial Fund committee and being chosen from 33 different designs. At this point, the committee expected that the statue would cost £14,000 and take two years to complete. However, the outbreak of World War II delayed its construction significantly, and so the monument was unveiled in July 1952, funded by public subscription and by council.

=== 2024 vandalism and decapitation ===
In the early hours of Monday 10 June 2024, King Charles's Official Birthday, the George V statue on the monument was beheaded, and red paint was thrown onto it. A video of the incident posted online showed a person wearing a high-vis jacket and head torch sawing off the head with a mechanical saw, causing it to tumble onto the ground, as well as a person wearing a dark-coloured hoodie spray painting the words "the colony will fall" over part of the statue. The video, which was soundtracked by the Sex Pistols' "God Save The Queen", ends with the caption "Happy birthday motherfucker". Police were called just after 9am on Monday, finding the statue beheaded.

A spokesman for the City of Melbourne Council said that the statue could not be repaired due to the missing head and the original artist having died many years ago. Lord Mayor of Melbourne, Nicholas Reece, said that the vandalism would "not be tolerated"; he said that CCTV cameras would be placed around major monuments with increasing security patrols.

Since this beheading, the head was posted on Instagram in various situations around Melbourne. This began on Australia Day on 26 January 2025; three activist organisations – Whistleblowers, Activists and Communities Alliance (WACA), Disrupt Wars, and hip-hop group Combat Wombat simultaneously posted a video of the head in flames on a barbecue, accompanied by an audio clip of chef Jamie Oliver speaking about obtaining colour and caramelisation through direct heat, and with the caption "Cooking with king. Hot tips for roasting #invasionday #notourking #cooking #cookingwithlove". The head was later posted in a two-part series of videos titled "Toilet King" in which it was filmed in toilets, a comic skit about returning land to Indigenous Australians. Another featured the head being carried back to Kings Domain in a Deliveroo bag, yards from the main statue, soundtracked by Cliff Richard's song "Summer Holiday".

On 14 March 2025, Saint Patrick's Day weekend, the head appeared at the final Melbourne show of Irish hip-hop band Kneecap's tour. The band is known for their anti-colonialist politics and promotion of indigenous language. The head was photographed in front of one of the group members, Mo Chara; the band stated in an Instagram caption that "Some madman dropped by with a huge King George’s head so he could hear a few tunes for our last Melbourne show!", and that "he was put on stage for a few tunes and then whisked away". The head was present at a sound check before the event, and was taken with the band when they left the venue. As of 25 March 2025, no arrests have been made and the head has not been recovered.

In May 2025, SBS interviewed the anonymous group responsible for the decapitation, who stated that they felt it was "important that this king no longer has a head, but we by no means take it lightly, and it is a serious piece of evidence."
