= Lá =

Northern Irish newspaper

- Lá Nua front page 21 May 2004
- Type: Daily newspaper
- Format: Tabloid
- Publisher: Belfast Media Group
- Editor: Dónall Mac Giolla Chóill
- Founded: 1984
- Ceased publication: December 2008
- Language: Irish
- Headquarters: Teach Basil, 2 Hannahstown Hill, Belfast. Northern Ireland

Lá (Irish for "Day"; later known as Lá Nua, Irish for "New Day") was an Irish-language daily newspaper based in Belfast, Northern Ireland. It was the first daily newspaper in Ireland to be published in Irish. Lá Nua was owned by the Belfast Media Group, and was a sister paper of the Andersonstown News.

Established in the 1980s, it developed from a broadsheet format to a European tabloid size. With a print circulation of a few thousand and an active website, Lá catered for the Irish language community throughout the island and abroad. It had a range of supplements, including Arts, Education, Sport, Business and Entertainment.

It had five editors, including founders Gearóid Ó Cairealláin and Eoghan Ó Néill, Ciarán Ó Pronntaigh, Concubhar Ó Liatháin and finally Dónall Mac Giolla Chóill (Feb-Dec 2008).

In October 2008, it was announced that the newspaper would cease publication at the end of 2008. Foras na Gaeilge decided not to further fund the paper due to its insufficient circulation and availability. The final issue was published on 19 December 2008.

The literary section was carried in the Andersonstown News for a few months edited by Dónall Mac Giolla Chóill and later by Ciarán Ó Pronntaigh, and all the articles were available on the official site, nuacht.com, until the site was finally taken offline.

== See also ==
- List of Irish-language media
- Scúp, TV drama about an Irish-language newspaper in Belfast
