= Kneecap (film) =

2024 musical film

- Theatrical release poster
- Directed by: Rich Peppiatt
- Screenplay by: Rich Peppiatt
- Story by: Rich Peppiatt; Liam Óg Ó hAnnaidh; Naoise Ó Cairealláin; JJ Ó Dochartaigh
- Produced by: Jack Tarling; Trevor Birney
- Starring: Naoise Ó Cairealláin; Liam Óg Ó hAnnaidh; JJ Ó Dochartaigh; Josie Walker; Fionnuala Flaherty; Jessica Reynolds; Adam Best; Simone Kirby; Michael Fassbender
- Cinematography: Ryan Kernaghan
- Edited by: Julian Ulrichs; Chris Gill
- Music by: Michael "Mikey J" Asante
- Production companies: BFI; Fine Point Films; Mother Tongues Films; TG4; Northern Ireland Screen's Irish Language Broadcast Fund and Screen Fund; Coimisiún na Meán; Fís Éireann/Screen Ireland; Great Point Media
- Distributed by: Wildcard Distribution (Ireland); Curzon Film (United Kingdom)
- Release dates: 18 January 2024 (Sundance); 8 August 2024 (Ireland); 23 August 2024 (United Kingdom)
- Running time: 105 minutes
- Countries: Ireland; United Kingdom
- Languages: Irish; English
- Budget: €4.5 million
- Box office: $4.9 million

Kneecap is a 2024 biographical comedy-drama film written and directed by Rich Peppiatt, depicting the rise of Kneecap, an Irish hip-hop trio from Belfast, Northern Ireland. The film stars the band members Liam Óg Ó hAnnaidh, Naoise Ó Cairealláin, and JJ Ó Dochartaigh as themselves, with Josie Walker, Fionnuala Flaherty, Jessica Reynolds, Adam Best, Simone Kirby, and Michael Fassbender in supporting roles.

Kneecap premiered at the 2024 Sundance Film Festival on 18 January, the first film in the Irish language to do so, where it won the NEXT Audience Award. Its Irish premiere, at the 36th edition of the Galway Film Fleadh, won Best Irish Film, the Audience Award and the Irish Language Feature Film Award. The film was released on 2 August 2024 in the United States by Sony Pictures Classics, on 8 August 2024 in Ireland, and in the United Kingdom on 23 August, by Wildcard Distribution and Curzon Film, respectively. It received nominations in six categories at the 78th British Academy Film Awards and was selected as the Irish entry for the Academy Award for Best International Feature Film at the 97th Academy Awards, but was not nominated.

== Plot ==
In the late 2010s, Liam Óg Ó hAnnaidh and Naoise Ó Cairealláin are part of the post-Troubles "ceasefire generation" living in the Gaeltacht Quarter of Belfast, Northern Ireland. Growing up, they learnt to speak Irish from Naoise's father, Arlo, a former republican paramilitary who faked his death to evade British authorities. Consequently, Naoise's mother Dolores has become a recluse while Arlo lives in hiding, and is disappointed with his son's hedonistic lifestyle and lack of initiative.

One night, Liam is arrested at a drug-laden party; he later outrages the police with his refusal to speak English, insisting he can communicate only in Irish. JJ Ó Dochartaigh, a music teacher at an Irish-language immersion school, is summoned to serve as an interpreter during Liam's interrogation. He helps him avoid charges and hides a notebook of Liam's that he discovers contains drugs, slipping it into his pocket.

JJ reads Liam's notebook, discovering satirical verses written in Irish. He decides to set them to music as rap lyrics, before approaching Liam and Naoise with the idea of forming an Irish-language hip-hop group, arguing that the music would be a way to promote the language to Millennials and Generation Z. Meanwhile, Liam begins a relationship with a Protestant girl named Georgia. Liam names the group "Kneecap", after the infamous punitive torture technique common in Northern Ireland during the Troubles.

The trio create a track together during an all-night, drug-fuelled recording session. They start performing live at a pub and their music draws crowds. However, JJ fears the damage to his teaching career that might result from a public connection with Kneecap's confrontational and blatantly political music; resultantly, he adopts the anonymous moniker of "DJ Próvaí", wearing an Irish tricolour balaclava to hide his face during gigs. He also conceals his involvement in the band from his girlfriend, Caitlin, who is heavily involved in the campaign for an Irish Language Act that would officially recognise the Irish language in Northern Ireland.

As Kneecap grow in popularity, they face controversy for promoting anti-social behaviour and outspoken republicanism in their lyrics. A dissident republican organisation calling themselves "Radical Republicans Against Drugs" (RRAD) threaten and attack Liam and Naoise. The garage containing Kneecap's recording studio and their recorded music is bombed, and the group believe RRAD is responsible.

Facing a tight deadline to produce a new track for RTÉ Raidió na Gaeltachta, the group break into the music department of the school where JJ works and record a song overnight using the equipment there, after which JJ announces he wishes to leave the group. The song is initially banned from the radio due to its explicit lyrics, but after Dolores organises a local protest campaign, the song is aired and becomes a hit. With his identity as DJ Próvaí now public, JJ is dismissed from his teaching job and Caitlin breaks up with him. With little left to lose and after some hesitation, JJ decides to rejoin Kneecap.

At a major gig, Kneecap publicly humiliate RRAD by playing an audio recording of its members demanding that Liam and Naoise turn drug money over to them. Enraged, an RRAD member in the crowd fires a gun and, in the ensuing chaos, Liam is apprehended by the police and Naoise is captured by RRAD. PSNI Detective Ellis, an Ulster Loyalist and Georgia's aunt, viciously beats Liam before revealing that she arranged for the studio to be bombed in an attempt to halt Kneecap's rise to fame, having previously warned JJ and Dolores of the damage it would bring. Meanwhile, the RRAD prepare to kneecap the kidnapped Naoise when Arlo appears on the scene. Initially pretending that he intends to punish his son himself, Arlo instead shoots the three RRAD members (two of whom, as he reveals, work undercover for the MI5 and the "Special Branch", respectively) and tells Naoise that he is proud of him and his music. He allows himself to be arrested, while Liam is grudgingly released from police custody.

Kneecap's music becomes ever more popular despite Protestant Unionist efforts to stop them. Meanwhile, Caitlin continues her political campaign for the Irish Language Act, Dolores is shown singing in a pub, and Georgia and other students of various ages and backgrounds participate in an Irish-language class led by JJ.

== Cast ==
- Liam Óg "Mo Chara" Ó hAnnaidh as himself
- Naoise "Móglaí Bap" Ó Cairealláin as himself
- JJ "DJ Próvaí" Ó Dochartaigh as himself
- Josie Walker as Detective Ellis
- Fionnuala Flaherty as Caitlin
- Jessica Reynolds as Georgia
- Adam Best as Doyle
- Simone Kirby as Dolores Uí Cairealláin (inspired by Aoife Ní Riain)
- Michael Fassbender as Arló Ó Cairealláin (inspired by Gearóid Ó Cairealláin)
- Marty Maguire as PSNI Officer
- Matthew Sharpe as Sean
- Cathal Mercer as Fra

== Production ==
Jack Tarling and Trevor Birney produce for Mother Tongues and Fine Point Films, respectively. Rich Peppiatt wrote and directed the film despite not being an Irish speaker himself. It is his feature film directing debut. He previously directed the video for the band's single "Guilty Conscience". The band themselves are cast in the film in their acting debuts. They feature alongside experienced Irish actors such as Michael Fassbender, Josie Walker and Simone Kirby. Principal photography took place on location in Belfast in May 2023.

== Music ==
Kneecap: Music from the Motion Picture

Soundtrack album by various artists
- Released: 30 August 2024
- Labels: Heavenly Recordings; PIAS
- Producer: Michael "Mikey J" Asante

Kneecap chronology
Fine Art (2024)	Kneecap: Music from the Motion Picture (2024)	Fine Art (Remixes) (2024)

The film's soundtrack album was released digitally on 30 August 2024, featuring tracks by Kneecap, Bicep, Fontaines D.C., and Orbital, as well as incidental music by Michael "Mikey J" Asante and snippets of dialogue from the film. The album was released on CD and vinyl on 28 February 2025. The film also features music by the Prodigy. "Sick in the Head" was shortlisted at the 97th Academy Awards in the category of Best Original Song.

Kneecap: Music from the Motion Picture track listing
No.	Title	Performer(s)	Length
1.	"Parful"	Kneecap	3:27
2.	"It's Been Ages"	Kneecap	2:30
3.	"Run"	Mikey J	1:01
4.	"'Nothing but a H.O.O.D'"	Marty McGuire; Liam Óg Ó Hannaidh	0:50
5.	"Civil Rights"	Mikey J	0:47
6.	"'A wee operation'"	Michael Fassbender; Cillian Kernan; Aidan McCaughey	0:20
7.	"Dad's Gone"	Mikey J	0:58
8.	"Amach Anocht"	Kneecap	4:06
9.	"'You bring a stolen car here'"	Michael Fassbender; Naoise Ó Cairealláin	0:58
10.	"Ceasefire Babies"	Mikey J	1:06
11.	"Guilty Conscience"	Kneecap	2:50
12.	"'Love affair with the shniff'"	Liam Óg Ó Hannaidh	0:18
13.	"C.E.A.R.T.A"	Kneecap	3:36
14.	"Arrested"	Mikey J	2:03
15.	"80%"	Dirty Faces	3:29
16.	"3CAG"	Kneecap featuring Radie Peat	2:59
17.	"The A Minor Set"	The Bonny Men	5:52
18.	"'No need to panic'"	Naoise Ó Cairealláin; Gerry Adams	0:39
19.	"Thart agus Thart"	Kneecap	1:57
20.	"'What the fuck was that?!'"	Liam Óg Ó hAnnaidh; Jessica Reynolds	0:41
21.	"Glue"	Bicep	4:29
22.	"'There are 80,000 native Irish speakers...'"	Liam Óg Ó hAnnaidh	0:33
23.	"Sick in the Head"	Kneecap	2:21
24.	"Liberty Belle"	Fontaines D.C.	2:31
25.	"'Special delivery'"	Liam Óg Ó hAnnaidh; Naoise Ó Cairealláin; Adam Best; Cathal Mercer	1:11
26.	"Phone Booth"	Mikey J; Gemma Doherty; Simone Kirby	0:51
27.	"Ash Plant"	Absolute Lift	0:56
28.	"Belfast"	Orbital	8:07
29.	"Better Way to Live"	Kneecap featuring Grian Chatten	2:57
30.	"Kneecapped"	Mikey J	1:59
31.	"Fall in Love Again"	Alanna Royale	4:56
32.	"Is a Bullet"	Mikey J; Gemma Doherty; Simone Kirby	2:41
33.	"'The Irish for the end is...'"	Liam Óg Ó hAnnaidh	0:06
34.	"H.O.O.D"	Kneecap	2:54

Notes

- The digital download edition of the album includes a special version of Orbital's "Belfast" as a bonus track.
- Physical editions of the album include "Every fucking story about Belfast starts like this" as the first track.
- Physical editions of the album omit "'There are 80,000 native Irish speakers...'".
- Physical editions of the album have "Belfast (Fuck the Fuck Off)" credited to Liam Óg Ó hAnnaidh, Kerri Quinn, and Orbital as track 28.

== Release and reception ==
The film premiered in the Next section at the Sundance Film Festival, the first Irish-language film to do so, on 18 January 2024. Before that, Sony Pictures Classics acquired distribution rights for North and Latin America, Eastern Europe, Turkey and the Middle East. The film was not shown in Israel as a protest against the ongoing conflict in Palestine. Kneecap, known for their strong pro-Palestinian stance, made this decision to align with their advocacy for Palestinian rights. Sony Pictures Classics scheduled the film for a theatrical release in the United States on 2 August 2024. The film was also scheduled to be the opening film at Sundance's London edition on 6 June 2024 and was released in the United Kingdom and Ireland in August 2024.

The film has been selected for the MAMI Mumbai Film Festival 2024 under the World Cinema section.

=== Critical response ===
On the review aggregator website Rotten Tomatoes, 96% of 143 critics' reviews are positive, with an average rating of 7.8/10. The website's consensus reads: "A rebellious anthem for cultural preservation, Kneecap is as shaggy, rambunctious, and lovable as the eponymous hip hop group at its center." Metacritic, which uses a weighted average, assigned the film a score of 76 out of 100, based on 33 critics, indicating "generally favorable" reviews.

Carlos Aguilar of Variety gave the film a positive review, writing: "Bursting with unruly energy that practically escapes the confines of the screen, Kneecap is a riotous, drug-laced triumph in the name of freedom that bridges political substance and crowd-pleasing entertainment." PopMatters called it one of the strongest films of 2024, praising its discussion of "class issues" and "use of colour."

==== Accolades ====
Award	Date of ceremony	Category	Recipient(s)	Result	Ref.
Sundance Film Festival	26 January 2024	NEXT Audience Award	Kneecap	Won	
Sydney Film Festival	16 June 2024	Sydney Film Prize	Kneecap	Nominated	
Sydney Film Festival	16 June 2024	GIO Audience Award for Best International Feature	Kneecap	Runner-up	
Galway Film Fleadh	14 July 2024	Best Irish Language Feature Film	Kneecap	Won	
Galway Film Fleadh	14 July 2024	Best Irish Film	Kneecap	Won	
Galway Film Fleadh	14 July 2024	Best Audience Award	Kneecap	Won	
Clio Entertainment Awards	14 November 2024	Theatrical: Trailer	"Kneecap Redband Trailer" by Silk Factory for Curzon Film	Won	
European Film Awards	7 December 2024	European University Film Award	Kneecap	Nominated	
European Film Awards	7 December 2024	European Discovery – Prix FIPRESCI	Rich Peppiatt	Nominated	
Astra Film Awards	8 December 2024	Best International Feature	Kneecap	Nominated	
British Independent Film Awards	8 December 2024	Best British Independent Film	Rich Peppiatt, Trevor Birney, and Jack Tarling	Won	
British Independent Film Awards	8 December 2024	Best Director	Rich Peppiatt	Nominated	
British Independent Film Awards	8 December 2024	Best Debut Director	Rich Peppiatt	Nominated	
British Independent Film Awards	8 December 2024	Best Debut Screenwriter	Rich Peppiatt	Won	
British Independent Film Awards	8 December 2024	Best Joint Lead Performance	Liam Óg Ó hAnnaidh, Naoise Ó Cairealláin, and JJ Ó Dochartaigh	Won	
British Independent Film Awards	8 December 2024	Best Screenplay	Rich Peppiatt	Nominated	
British Independent Film Awards	8 December 2024	Best Casting	Carla Stronge	Won	
British Independent Film Awards	8 December 2024	Best Cinematography	Ryan Kernaghan	Nominated	
British Independent Film Awards	8 December 2024	Best Costume Design	Zjena Glamocanin	Nominated	
British Independent Film Awards	8 December 2024	Best Editing	Julian Ulrichs and Chris Gill	Won	
British Independent Film Awards	8 December 2024	Best Music Supervision	Gary Welch and Jeanette Rehnstrom	Won	
British Independent Film Awards	8 December 2024	Best Original Music	Michael "Mikey J" Asante	Won	
British Independent Film Awards	8 December 2024	Best Production Design	Nicola Moroney	Nominated	
British Independent Film Awards	8 December 2024	Best Sound	Louise Burton, Brendan Rehill, Aza Hand, and Chris Woodcock	Nominated	
San Francisco Bay Area Film Critics Circle	15 December 2024	Best International Feature Film	Kneecap	Nominated	
IndieWire Critics Poll	16 December 2024	Best International Film	Kneecap	10th place (Note: Tied with Red Rooms)	
Dallas–Fort Worth Film Critics Association	18 December 2024	Best Foreign Language Film	Kneecap	5th place	
Dublin Film Critics' Circle	19 December 2024	Best Irish Film	Kneecap	1st place	
Les Arcs Film Festival	20 December 2024	Crystal Arrow for Best Film	Rich Peppiatt	Won	
Les Arcs Film Festival	20 December 2024	Young Jury Prize	Rich Peppiatt	Won	
Les Arcs Film Festival	20 December 2024	Cinglés du Cinéma Prize	Rich Peppiatt	Won	
Les Arcs Film Festival	20 December 2024	Best Original Music	Michael "Mikey J" Asante	Won	
Kansas City Film Critics Circle	4 January 2025	Best Foreign Language Film	Kneecap	Nominated	
Austin Film Critics Association	6 January 2025	Best International Film	Kneecap	Nominated	
Georgia Film Critics Association	7 January 2025	Best International Film	Kneecap	Nominated	
Georgia Film Critics Association	7 January 2025	Best Original Song	"Sick in the Head"	Nominated	
Cinema Eye Honors	9 January 2025	Kneecap	Heterodox Award	Nominated	
Palm Springs International Film Festival	12 January 2025	FIPRESCI Prize for Best International Feature Film	Kneecap	Nominated	
Palm Springs International Film Festival	12 January 2025	FIPRESCI Prize for Best Actor in an International Feature Film	Mo Chara, Móglaí Bap, and DJ Provái (Note: Jury statement: "To Mo Chara, Móglaí Bap, and DJ Provái, for their seamless performance as an ensemble of musicians who make their acting debut in Kneecap. Proving equally authentic and explosive in both capacities, they bring a fresh and propulsive energy to the whole notion of cultural identity.")	Honored	
Houston Film Critics Society	14 January 2025	Best Foreign Language Feature	Kneecap	Nominated	
London Film Critics' Circle	2 February 2025	Film of the Year	Kneecap	Nominated	
London Film Critics' Circle	2 February 2025	Foreign Language Film of the Year	Kneecap	Nominated	
London Film Critics' Circle	2 February 2025	British/Irish Film of the Year	Kneecap	Nominated	
London Film Critics' Circle	2 February 2025	Breakthrough British/Irish Filmmaker of the Year	Rich Peppiatt	Won	
Critics' Choice Awards	7 February 2025	Best Foreign Language Film	Kneecap	Nominated	
Artios Awards	12 February 2025	International Film	Carla Stronge	Nominated	
IFTA Awards	14 February 2025	Best Film	Kneecap	Nominated	
IFTA Awards	14 February 2025	Best Director – Film	Rich Peppiatt	Won	
IFTA Awards	14 February 2025	Best Lead Actor – Film	Naoise Ó Caireallain	Nominated	
IFTA Awards	14 February 2025	Best Lead Actor – Film	JJ Ó Dochartaigh	Nominated	
IFTA Awards	14 February 2025	Best Lead Actor – Film	Liam Óg Ó hAnnaidh	Nominated	
IFTA Awards	14 February 2025	Best Supporting Actor – Film	Michael Fassbender	Nominated	
IFTA Awards	14 February 2025	Best Supporting Actress – Film	Fionnuala Flaherty	Nominated	
IFTA Awards	14 February 2025	Best Supporting Actress – Film	Simone Kirby	Nominated	
IFTA Awards	14 February 2025	Best Supporting Actress – Film	Jessica Reynolds	Nominated	
IFTA Awards	14 February 2025	Best Script – Film	Rich Peppiatt	Nominated	
IFTA Awards	14 February 2025	Best Casting	Carla Stronge	Won	
IFTA Awards	14 February 2025	Best Cinematography	Ryan Kernaghan	Nominated	
IFTA Awards	14 February 2025	Best Costume Design	Zjena Glamocanin	Won	
IFTA Awards	14 February 2025	Best Editing	Julian Ulrichs and Chris Gill	Won	
IFTA Awards	14 February 2025	Best Hair & Make-up	Liz Boston	Nominated	
IFTA Awards	14 February 2025	Best Production Design	Nicola Moroney	Nominated	
IFTA Awards	14 February 2025	Best Sound	Aza Hand, Brendan Rehill, and Chris Woodcock	Nominated	
British Academy Film Awards	16 February 2025	Best Original Screenplay	Rich Peppiatt, Naoise Ó Cairealláin, Liam Óg Ó hAnnaidh, and JJ Ó Dochartaigh	Nominated	
British Academy Film Awards	16 February 2025	Best Casting	Carla Stronge	Nominated	
British Academy Film Awards	16 February 2025	Best Editing	Julian Ulrichs and Chris Gill	Nominated	
British Academy Film Awards	16 February 2025	Best Film Not in the English Language	Rich Peppiatt and Jack Tarling	Nominated	
British Academy Film Awards	16 February 2025	Outstanding British Film	Rich Peppiatt, Trevor Birney, Jack Tarling, Naoise Ó Cairealláin, Liam Óg Ó hAnnaidh, and JJ Ó Dochartaigh	Nominated	
British Academy Film Awards	16 February 2025	Outstanding Debut by a British Writer, Director or Producer	Rich Peppiatt	Won	
Golden Reel Awards	23 February 2025	Outstanding Achievement in Sound Editing – Feature International	Supervising Sound Editor: Brendan Rehill; Supervising Dialogue Editor: Louise Burton; Foley Editor: Damien Lynch; Foley Artists: Caoimhe Doyle and Emer O'Reilly	Nominated	
Golden Trailer Awards	29 May 2025	Best Independent Trailer	Curzon / Silk Factory (for "Redband")	Nominated	
Golden Trailer Awards	29 May 2025	Most Original Trailer	Curzon / Silk Factory (for "Redband")	Nominated	
Golden Trailer Awards	29 May 2025	Most Original Foreign Trailer	Curzon / Silk Factory (for "Redband")	Won	
Golden Trailer Awards	29 May 2025	Best International Poster	Wildcard Distribution / Coffee & Cigarettes	Nominated	

== See also ==
- List of films about bands
- List of Academy Award winners and nominees from Ireland
- List of Irish submissions for the Academy Award for Best International Feature Film
- List of submissions to the 97th Academy Awards for Best International Feature Film
