= Gearóid Ó Cairealláin =

Northern Irish language activist (1957–2024)

- Born: October 1957; Belfast West, Northern Ireland
- Died: 20 December 2024 (aged 67); Belfast, Northern Ireland
- Education: St Mary's Christian Brothers' Grammar School, Belfast
- Occupation: Language activist
- Spouse: Bríd Ó Gallchoir
- Children: 3, including Naoise

Gearóid Ó Cairealláin (October 1957 – 20 December 2024) was an Irish activist of the Irish language who was credited with playing a huge role in promoting the Irish language in Northern Ireland, especially in Belfast West, and on the island as a whole.

== Early life ==
Ó Cairealláin was born in October 1957. He hailed from Belfast West, where he attended St Mary's Christian Brothers' Grammar School, Belfast. It was there that he became interested in the Irish language.

== Employment and Irish language promotion ==
After leaving school, he worked in various clerical positions and became more active in several Irish language organisations. He founded the weekly publication Preas an Phobail, which evolved into the Irish language daily newspaper Lá in 1984. He was a founding member of Aisling Ghéar - the Irish-language theatre group, Raidió Fáilte - the Irish-language radio station, and Cultúrlann McAdam Ó Fiaich - the Irish language cultural centre on the Falls Road, Belfast.

He helped establish Meánscoil Feirste which became Coláiste Feirste, the only secondary-level Irish-medium school in Belfast.

From 1995 to 1998, he was president of the Irish language advocacy group Conradh na Gaeilge.

In 2006, he suffered a stroke which left him paralysed from the waist down but he continued to advocate for the Irish language.

== Personal life ==
Ó Cairealláin was married to Bríd Ó Gallchoir and had three children. He was also a successful musician. One of his children is Naoise Ó‌ Cairealláin, aka Móglaí Bap, a member of the Irish-language rap group Kneecap.

Ó Cairealláin died at the Royal Victoria Hospital in Belfast on 20 December 2024, at the age of 67.
