= Robert Arkins =

Irish musician and actor

Robert Arkins is an Irish musician and actor who played the role of Jimmy Rabbitte in the 1991 film The Commitments.

== Life and career ==
A native of Drumcondra, Dublin, Arkins has been a professional musician from the age of 15. He left school at 17 to front his band, Housebroken. He is a vocalist, songwriter and multi-instrumentalist, who counts piano, bass and trumpet in his repertoire. Housebroken won the Sunday World "Bandslam" competition in 1988, after only having been established for three months.

With no prior acting experience, Arkins heard of the filming of The Commitments from his sister who was managing his musical career. Following seven auditions, Arkins was cast as "Deco Cuffe", the band's lead singer, but was replaced in that role after director Alan Parker discovered newcomer Andrew Strong. Arkins was cast as Jimmy Rabbitte, the manager of The Commitments. Parker described the character of Rabbitte as "the glue that holds the whole film together". Despite not featuring as a singer in the film, Arkins did provide lead vocals for two tracks, Treat Her Right and Slip Away, on the accompanying soundtrack album.

Following the release of The Commitments, Arkins moved back into music and signed a record deal with MCA Records in 1993, although he did not finish recording the consequent album. He has composed and produced work for a number of commercial clients, television projects, and for two short films. He briefly returned to acting in 1998, in a short film entitled What Are You Looking At?, and again in 2018 in the lead role of the film The Comeback. In 2011, he joined fellow various cast members from The Commitments to perform a series of concerts across Ireland, to celebrate the film's 20th anniversary. This was followed by three dates in the UK in 2012. In 2026, he will front "Robert Arkins Commitments" on a UK and Ireland Tour.
