= Kneecap (band) =

Hip-hop group from Northern Ireland

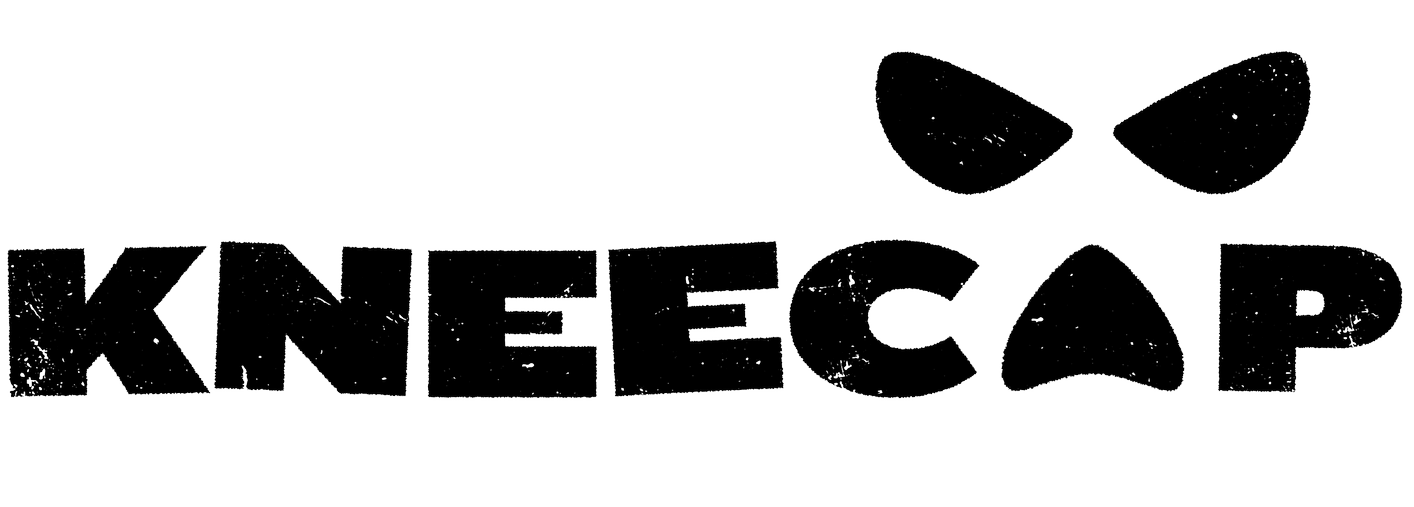

Background information
- Origin: Belfast, Northern Ireland
- Genres: Hardcore hip-hop; political hip-hop; EDM
- Years active: 2017–present
- Label: Heavenly Recordings
- Members: Mo Chara; Móglaí Bap; DJ Próvaí
- Website: www.kneecap.ie

Kneecap are an Irish hip-hop trio from Belfast, Northern Ireland. It comprises Mo Chara, Móglaí Bap, and DJ Próvaí, the stage names of Liam Óg Ó hAnnaidh, Naoise Ó Cairealláin and J. J. Ó Dochartaigh, respectively. They rap in a mixture of English and Irish. Their first single "C.E.A.R.T.A." (cearta is Irish for 'rights') was released in 2017, followed by their mixtape, 3CAG, in 2018. Their first studio album, Fine Art, was released in 2024, and a biographical film was released later the same year. Their second studio album, Fenian, was released in May 2026.

The group has been at the centre of public debates about free speech and the expression of political opinions within Ireland and the UK. Their themes focus on working class Belfast youth culture, Irish republicanism and Irish language rights. In concert, they have made statements supporting Palestinian nationalism and condemning the Gaza genocide. Their name is derived from the extralegal punishment attacks meted out by Northern Irish paramilitary groups.

== Name and image ==
The name Kneecap is a word play, referring to both the practice of kneecapping, a punishment of gunshots to the knees that Irish republican paramilitaries inflicted on what they called "political" and "normal" criminals, including drug dealers and others, as a form of vigilante justice, and the Irish phrase "ní cheapaim" (which sounds like "kneecap him"), meaning "I don't think so". Móglaí said it is intentionally ironic that a group with the name Kneecap sings "about things that would get us kneecapped", such as drugs.

Kneecap's logo is based on the balaclavas paramilitaries wore during the Troubles. DJ Próvaí often wears an Irish tricolour balaclava in public. The Guardian wrote that Kneecap's earlier work focused on merging Gaelic identity with hood culture; in Northern Ireland, "hoods" are petty criminals and drug dealers.

The stage name Mo Chara in Irish means "my friend". Móglaí Bap refers to the singer being noted as a kid for his bowl haircut, reminiscent of Mowgli in the cartoon The Jungle Book. DJ Próvaí's name comes from the Provisional IRA.

== History ==
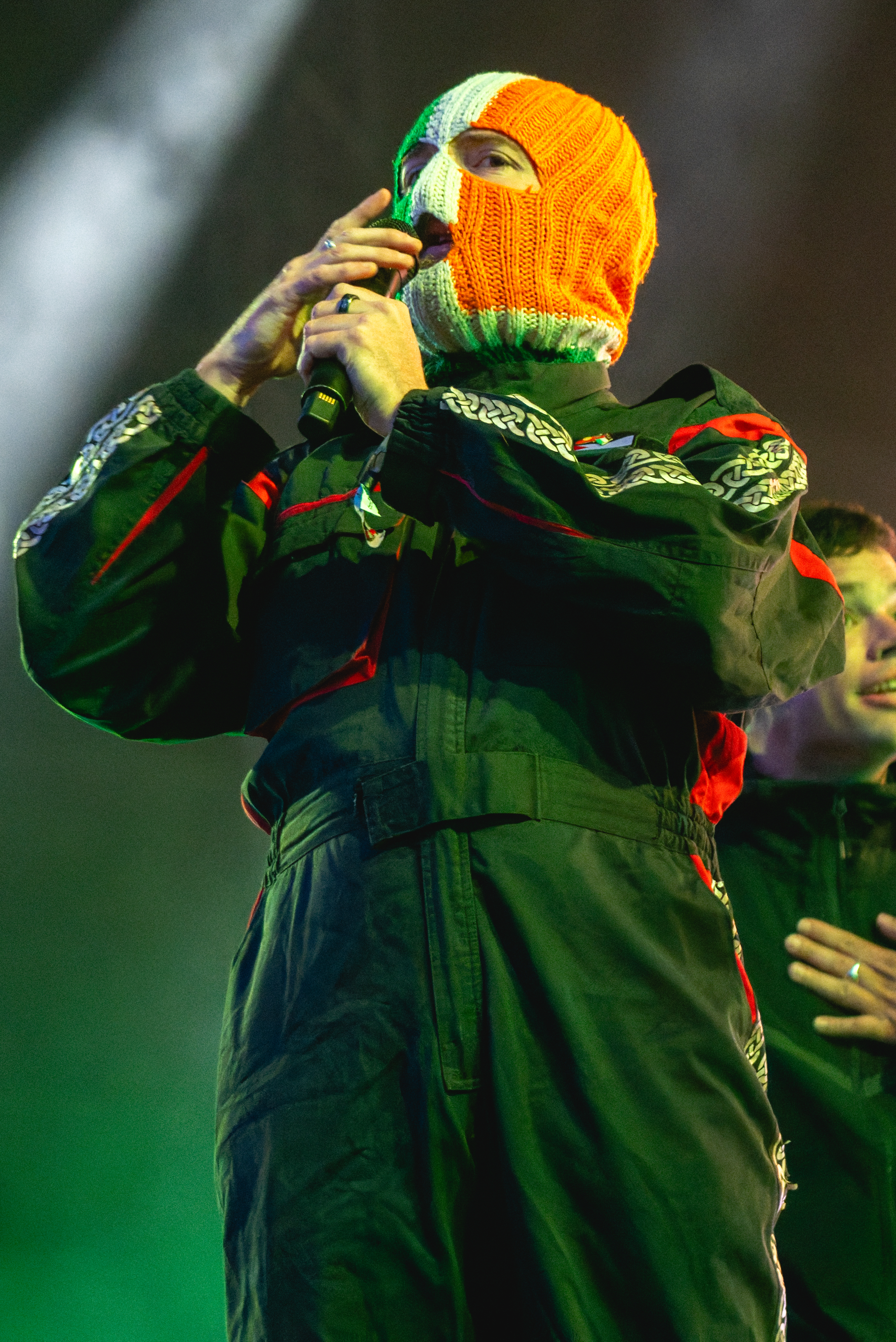
DJ Próvaí

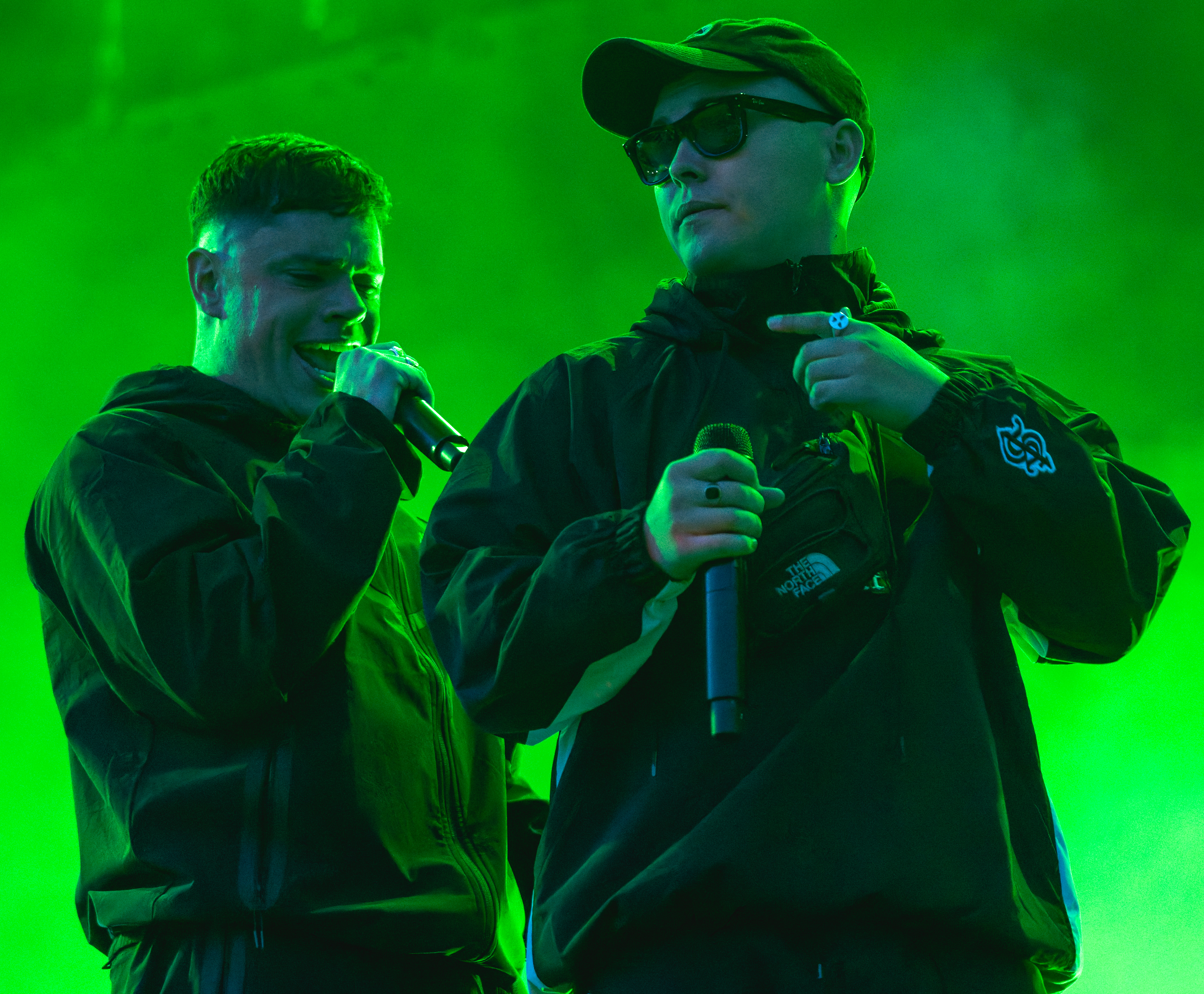
Móglaí Bap (left) and Mo Chara (right)

Kneecap performing in 2025

Their first single "C.E.A.R.T.A." was loosely based on Móglaí Bap's experience. On the day before the Irish Language Act march in Belfast, Móglaí Bap went out with a friend of his and spray-painted the word "Cearta" on a bus stop. The Police Service of Northern Ireland found that and arrested his friend, although Móglaí managed to escape. The friend only spoke Irish at the police station, and spent a night there, refusing to speak English. Following this incident, "C.E.A.R.T.A." was written.

Their song "C.E.A.R.T.A." was banned from the Irish-medium radio station RTÉ Raidió na Gaeltachta (RnaG) for "drug references and cursing" in late 2017. Fans started a petition which garnered 700 signatures to put the song back on air. Kneecap defended the song as "a caricature of life in west Belfast" and "a satirical take on life for young people, particularly in West Belfast".

The group's first full-length album, 3CAG, was released in 2018. The title references the drug MDMA: 3CAG means trí chonsan agus guta ('three consonants and a vowel'), slang for the substance. The release was retrospectively described in The Skinny as "an irresistible collection of raucous hip-hop that fused the Irish and English languages with a wicked sense of humour." It was retrospectively described in The Guardian as "self-aware and swaggering in equal measure as it flipped between nights on the town to the everyday reality of growing up in post-Troubles Northern Ireland."

While Mo Chara and Móglaí Bap are from West Belfast, DJ Próvaí is from Derry. He was a teacher until 2020, when he left his school after they were alerted to a video in which he had "Brits Out" written on his buttocks during a concert.

They were condemned by Belfast South Democratic Unionist Party (DUP) MLA Christopher Stalford in February 2019 after videos of the trio were posted online, showing them chanting "Brits Out" at a concert performed in the Empire Music Hall in Belfast. The concert took place the day after the then-Duke of Cambridge and Duchess of Cambridge had visited the same venue.

The trio released their single "MAM" in 2021 as a tribute to their mothers; the song was acknowledged as a shift away from their usual style saying that they wanted to do something more "real". Mo Chara stated in an interview that they wanted to show that "we can 'roundhouse' you off the stage but we can also give you a hug afterwards. We wanted to do something a bit sentimental, we don't wanna just box ourselves in with masculinity all the time." The trio also revealed on Instagram that Móglaí Bap's mother had died of suicide before the song was ready for release, and that all proceeds from the song would be going to the Samaritans.

The group began filming a motion picture in 2023, also titled Kneecap, depicting a fictionalised account of their rise to fame. Released in August 2024, the film was directed by Rich Peppiatt with Michael Fassbender in a supporting role.

They were awarded a grant of £14,250 from the Music Export Growth Scheme in February 2024, which was then blocked by the Department for Business and Trade. Business secretary Kemi Badenoch said that the grant should not be awarded "to people that oppose the United Kingdom itself." The group filed a discrimination case against the UK government, winning the case and receiving the total grant amount in November 2024. They split the grant to two youth organisations who work with Protestant and Catholic communities in Northern Ireland. The band was scheduled to play at the 2024 South by Southwest festival in Austin, Texas, but pulled out citing the festival's financial ties with the US Army and RTX Corporation.

Mo Chara was charged under the Terrorism Act 2006 in May 2025 for allegedly displaying a Hezbollah flag in November 2024. He appeared at Westminster Magistrates' Court on 18 June 2025, was granted unconditional bail, and returned on 20 August 2025. After the hearing, Keir Starmer said their scheduled Glastonbury Festival 2025 performance on 28 June was not appropriate, to which the band retorted "You know what's 'not appropriate' Keir? Arming a fucking genocide. Fuck The Sun and solidarity with Palestine Action". On 26 September 2025, the court ruled that the charges could not proceed. Giving his ruling, the judge said: "Proceedings against the defendant were instituted unlawfully and are null." On 7 October 2025, the Crown Prosecution Service announced its intention to appeal.

Their set at Glastonbury Festival in 2025 drew a full-capacity crowd and opened with a video addressing media scrutiny. During the performance, the group led the crowd in chants of "Free Mo Chara" and "fuck Keir Starmer" and thanked the festival organisers for not yielding to pressure to cancel their appearance. Referencing his recent court appearance, Mo Chara told the audience, "I'm a free man." The BBC opted not to livestream the performance, instead releasing it later that evening on BBC iPlayer following editorial review. In response, an independent Welsh activist live-streamed the set on TikTok, attaining over 1.8 million likes. Following the set, Avon and Somerset Police stated that they were assessing video footage from the West Holts Stage to determine whether any offences had been committed that might warrant a criminal investigation. On 18 July 2025, the force announced that no further action would be taken, citing insufficient evidence to support a prosecution.

Kneecap were banned from entering Hungary for three years in July 2025. Hungarian government spokesperson Zoltán Kovács stated that the band members "repeatedly engage in anti-Semitic hate speech supporting terrorism and terrorist groups". Kneecap were set to perform at Budapest's Sziget Festival on 11 August 2025; Kovács said that the performance "posed a national security threat". Kneecap responded that "it's clear this is political distraction and a further attempt to silence those who call out genocide against the Palestinian people." Some of their concerts in Germany and Austria have also been cancelled.

They canceled all 15 US concerts scheduled for October 2025 due to proximity to a court date related to Mo Chara's alleged terrorism charge. They instead scheduled a live-streamed concert for 10 October 2025.

Canadian MP Vince Gasparro, the parliamentary secretary to the Secretary of State (Combatting Crime), announced on 19 September 2025 that the Canadian government had decided to ban Kneecap from entering the country, citing alleged support for designated terrorist groups and to protect Canada's Jewish community. Kneecap said that it had not received any official notice from the Government of Canada and was also considering legal action against Gasparro. During subsequent reporting by the Canadian Broadcasting Corporation, no relevant government department, official, or minister confirmed that there was a ban, and that Gasparro had acted without consulting public safety minister Gary Anandasangaree. In the first week of October, the Conservative Party and New Democratic Party, both in opposition, called for clarity on the issue and an investigation into whether Gasparro lied. In November 2025, Immigration, Refugees and Citizenship Canada (IRCC) stated that it had cancelled the travel authorization of Mo Chara in August due to "inadmissibility for omitting to disclose complete and accurate information on his application". IRCC had also instructed the other two members of the trio not to travel to Canada until they received further communication.

On 22 January 2026, mobile digital billboards began appearing in Belfast, with a phone number being promoted to "report fenian activity". The band later posted a teaser, promoting a new single titled "Liars Tale", which was released on 28 January. The link between the billboards and the band was confirmed on 27 January 2026, when another teaser was released, featuring phone calls to the number advertised on the billboards. On 28 January 2026, the band announced their third album, Fenian.

== Film ==
The 2024 biographical film Kneecap, in which the band members play themselves alongside more experienced actors including Michael Fassbender, Josie Walker, and Simone Kirby, is set in the West Belfast Gaeltacht Quarter in 2019. The film premiered at the Sundance Film Festival on 18 January 2024, being the first film in the Irish language at the festival.

In August 2024, the Irish Film and Television Academy announced that they had selected Kneecap as their official submission to represent Ireland in the Best International Feature Film category at the 97th Academy Awards. On 17 December 2024, Kneecap were shortlisted for Academy Awards for the Best International Feature and Best Original Song with their song "Sick in the Head".

== Political views ==
=== Irish republicanism ===
Kneecap are heavily associated with Irish republicanism, which advocates for the reunification of Ireland and opposes British rule in Northern Ireland. Kneecap refer to themselves as "Republican Hoods" and their fans as "Fenians". Despite their republican themes, Kneecap says that republican paramilitaries would have given them punishment shootings (kneecappings) for some of the things they rap about. As is common in hip-hop, their lyrics and imagery are also hostile to the police; in 2022 they commissioned a mural in Belfast of a burning Police Service of Northern Ireland (PSNI) vehicle. They promote greater use of and support for the Irish language in Northern Ireland. Kneecap say they are anti-sectarian and want to foster working class solidarity among Catholics and Protestants in Northern Ireland. Mo Chara said "It doesn't matter who you are, where you're from. Just because we rap in Irish and might not align with your political views—we can be friends with people that we don't align with politically".

Móglaí Bap explained "we're political, but it's very tongue-in-cheek. We wanted to take the seriousness and the sting out of it and incorporate elements of life that we as young people enjoy—like partying and taking Class A drugs ... We're political with small p's". Referring to sectarian divisions in Belfast, he said that "The two communities in the [Catholic] Falls Road and [Protestant] Shankill suffer from a lot of the same problems—food banks, poverty, suicide ... The wall, unfortunately, doesn't stop these things going from one community to another ... I think a lot of politicians in the North would rather people focus on certain aspects of us to create division, but there's a lot more that we have in common".

DJ Próvaí said that "the biggest hurdle to a united Ireland is that unionists don't feel safe. It's very important that they have a place in Ireland. They should be able to hold dual citizenship if they want to, for example."

On 14 March 2025, the head of a statue of King George V appeared on stage during a Kneecap gig in Melbourne, Australia. It had been cut off by protesters during the 2024 King's Birthday. Kneecap made reference to the cut-off head in an Instagram post, writing "Remember, every colony can fall".

=== Palestine ===
Kneecap supports Palestinian self-determination and an end to the Israeli occupation of Palestine. They have flown Palestinian flags at concerts and pledge to boycott Israel. The Irish Independent reported that members have supported politician Clare Daly for her stance on Palestine. They have links with a volunteer gym in the Aida Refugee Camp in Bethlehem, having helped raise funds for it and promoted it on their Instagram; further, in 2022, Irish writer Manchán Magan released a cover of Kneecap's song "C.E.A.R.T.A" to raise money for the gym.

During their set at the April 2025 Coachella Festival, Kneecap displayed the messages "Israel is committing genocide against the Palestinian people" — "It is being enabled by the US" — "Fuck Israel / Free Palestine". This was widely covered by US news outlets, further raising interest in the group. Sharon Osbourne and the pro-Israel CCFP led calls for their visas to be revoked for alleged "hate speech", and the band were sent death threats. Kneecap replied, "Statements aren't aggressive, murdering 20,000 children is though". The band stated that its condemnation of Israel is not an attack against the Jewish people, adding, "We know there are massive numbers of Jewish people outraged by this genocide just as we are." The band also condemned the UK's alleged complicity in Israeli war crimes and the famine in Gaza, saying, "Instead of defending innocent people, or the principles of international law they claim to uphold, the powerful in Britain have abetted slaughter and famine in Gaza, just as they did in Ireland for centuries."

UK-based Campaign Against Antisemitism reported Kneecap to counter-terrorism police in April 2025. Shortly after their Coachella appearance, UK counter-terrorism police opened an investigation into Kneecap following videos from November 2023, in which a member said "the only good Tory is a dead Tory. Kill your local MP." No charges were pressed. In another video, one person from the band allegedly chanted "up Hamas, up Hezbollah". Police also charged him for a video from a London concert in November 2024, showing Mo Chara waving a flag of Hezbollah, a Lebanese Shia Islamist political party and paramilitary, deemed a terrorist organization by the United Kingdom and banned there. He denied the charges, saying the flag was thrown on the stage, and that he does not support Hezbollah. The band tweeted an image of a member reading a book of statements by then-Hezbollah leader Hassan Nasrallah in February 2025.

Under the Terrorism Act 2000, expressing support for those groups is an offence in the UK. The UK Prime Minister's Office said people holding such views should be barred from government funding, and Taoiseach Micheál Martin urged the band to clarify their position, noting Hezbollah's killing of Irish peacekeeper Seán Rooney. Kneecap responded that they "do not, and have never, supported Hamas or Hezbollah", condemned all attacks on civilians, and alleged footage was "deliberately taken out of all context" as part of a "coordinated smear campaign" over their criticism of "the ongoing genocide against the Palestinian people". The group offered an apology to the families of murdered MPs Jo Cox and David Amess. DUP MP Carla Lockhart dismissed the apology as "forced" and stated "It very much screams of 'sorry because they were caught'". British Conservative Party leader Kemi Badenoch called for Kneecap to be prosecuted. Over 40 artists defended Kneecap's freedom of expression, with Damien Dempsey calling them "three young peaceful warrior poets". Massive Attack criticised "politicians and right-wing journalists" for manufacturing outrage over a young punk band while ignoring "a genocide happening in real time".

The band joined the "No Music For Genocide" boycott in September 2025 to geo-block their music from music streaming platforms in Israel in protest of the Gaza genocide. The charges against Mo Chara were dismissed in the same month for missing the filing deadline, which the police are reviewing.

As part of the No Music For Genocide campaign, the band signed an open letter in April 2026 calling for a boycott of the Eurovision Song Contest 2026 due to Israel's participation.

In October 2026, the band signed an open letter backing author Sally Rooney, whose books were withdrawn from sale in the United Kingdom due to her support for Palestine Action, and calling the withdrawal an "affront to basic principles of free speech and expression".

=== Cuba ===
In March 2026, Kneecap joined Nuestra América Convoy, an international humanitarian mission organised by Progressive International to deliver aid to Cuba during a severe energy and economic crisis. The group traveled to Havana alongside other public figures, including former UK Labour leader Jeremy Corbyn. The band announced their participation via social media, stating they were "mobilising" to deliver critical medical supplies. They criticised the Second Trump Administration's fuel blockade, which they described as "strangling" the island. During a press conference in Havana on 20 March, Mo Chara drew parallels between Ireland, Cuba and Gaza, citing a shared legacy of "colonialism, forced starvation, and oppression".

== Reception ==
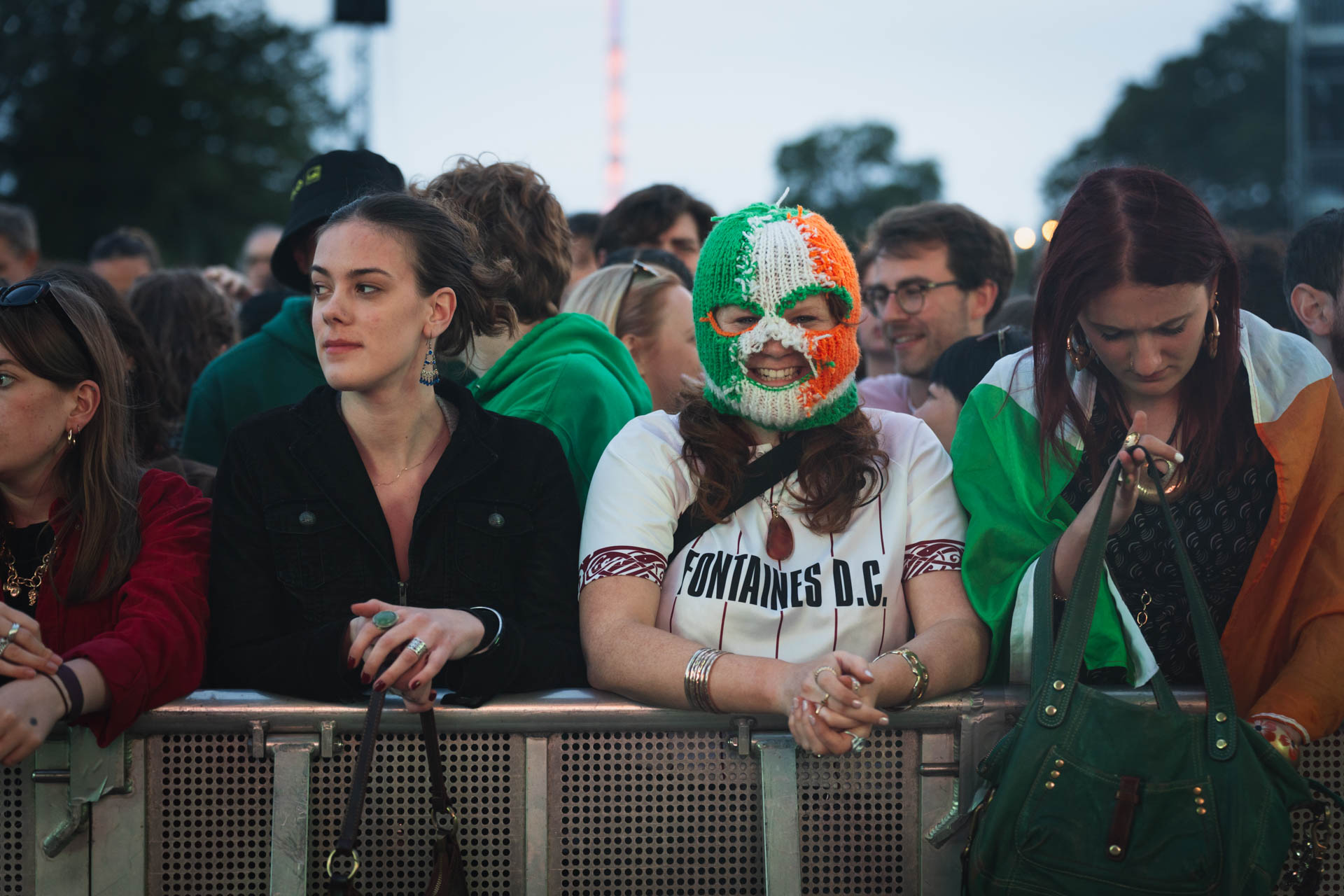
Fans of Kneecap at a concert, wearing an Irish tricolour balaclava (center) similar to the one of DJ Próvaí and an Irish flag (right).

Emer McLysaght of The Irish Times wrote that Kneecap "present an intelligent approach to social commentary and republicanism, more satire than sectarian. They punch up, not down. When they're not singing about more universal social topics like drugs, addiction and mental health, they're taking shots at the RUC, the PSNI, Arlene Foster and the UK government. They approach issues from a class perspective and, rather than demonising Unionists and Protestants, they advocate for working-class liberation en masse".

Miranda Sawyer noted that "Kneecap's humour is the key to their success. Their wit and eloquence shine through everything they do." and that "to most of their young fans Kneecap are simply a great band: funny, wild, a brilliant live act, a craic. As one YouTube commenter says: 'I do not understand a word they're saying, but I do understand that this is an absolute banger.'" Commenting on their Glastonbury Festival appearance in 2025, Alexis Petridis stated that "behind the furore, the trio are really good at what they do. Mo Chara and Móglaí Bap are impressive rappers – raw-throated but dextrous, far funnier than you might expect if the only stuff you heard about Kneecap revolved around recent events. And live, their sound comes into its own, a fizzing stew with a bassy intensity that has a hint of the Prodigy about it".

The band has also attracted criticism. Journalist Malachi O'Doherty said Kneecap "have worked diligently at presenting themselves as worthless layabouts. There's a dishonesty at the heart of that" and "Maybe what their success suggests is that hood culture and provie [Provisional IRA] culture are both now parodied rather than preserved with any integrity." Brendan O'Neill of Spiked concurred and has also questioned their authenticity: in a December 2024 article, he argued that Kneecap's radicalism is performative, with the band adopting republican imagery to entertain liberal, middle-class audiences. O'Neill stated "They're the cultural class larping as chavs, the Rachel Dolezals of republican chic" and argued that Kneecap only offer a sanitised, bourgeois-friendly version of resistance that flatters rather than challenges establishment sensibilities. Tom Jones of The Critic wrote that the group "provide[s] an attractive combination of an edgy appearance without genuine transgression."

== Discography ==
=== Studio albums ===
List of studio albums, with selected chart positions
Title	Album details	Peak chart positions					
Title	Album details	IRE	AUS	NZ	SCO	SWI	UK
Fine Art	Released: 14 June 2024; Label: Heavenly; Formats: LP, CD, digital download, streaming	2	—	—	3	—	43
Fenian	Released: 1 May 2026; Label: Heavenly; Formats: LP, CD, digital download, streaming	1	7	27	1	56	2
"—" denotes album did not chart in that territory.

=== Soundtrack albums ===
- Kneecap: Music from the Motion Picture (2024)

=== Mixtapes ===
Title	Mixtape details	Peak chart positions
Title	Mixtape details	IRE
3CAG	Released: 25 June 2018; Label: Heavenly; Format: LP, digital download, streaming	43

=== Extended plays ===
Title	EP details
Fine Art (Remixes)	Released: 4 November 2024; Label: Heavenly; Format: digital download
H.O.O.D 2025	Released: 27 January 2025; Label: Heavenly; Format: digital download

=== Singles ===
List of singles, with selected peak chart positions
Title	Year	Peak chart positions		Album
Title	Year	IRL	UK	Album
"C.E.A.R.T.A"	2017	78	—	3CAG
"Amach Anocht"	2018	—	—	3CAG
"H.O.O.D"	2019	14	— (Note: "H.O.O.D" did not enter the UK singles chart, but peaked at number 43 on the UK Independent Singles Chart.)	Non-album singles
"Gael-Gigolos"	2019	—	—	Non-album singles
"Fenian Cunts"	2019	—	—	Non-album singles
"Get Your Brits Out"	2019	51	—	Non-album singles
"Mam" (with Dyrt)	2020	—	—	Non-album singles
"Guilty Conscience"	2021	28	—	Non-album singles
"Thart agus Thart"	2021	—	—	Non-album singles
"It's Been Ages"	2023	—	—	Non-album singles
"Better Way to Live" (featuring Grian Chatten)	2023	61	— (Note: "Better Way to Live" did not enter the UK singles chart, but peaked at number 92 on the UK Singles Sales Chart.)	Fine Art
"Sick in the Head"	2024	— (Note: "Sick in the Head" did not enter the Irish Singles Chart, but peaked at number five on the Irish Homegrown chart.)	—	Fine Art
"Fine Art"	2024	— (Note: "Fine Art" did not enter the Irish Singles Chart, but peaked at number four on the Irish Homegrown chart.)	—	Fine Art
"Love Making" (with Nino)	2024	— (Note: "Love Making" did not enter the Irish Singles Chart, but peaked at number 18 on the Irish Homegrown chart.)	—	Fine Art
"The Recap" (featuring Mozey)	2025	30	—	Non-album singles
"Sayōnara" (with Paul Hartnoll)	2025	65	— (Note: "Sayōnara" did not enter the UK singles chart, but peaked at number 10 on the UK Singles Sales Chart.)	Non-album singles
"No Comment" (featuring Sub Focus)	2025	— (Note: "No Comment" did not enter the Irish Singles Chart, but peaked at number four on the Irish Homegrown chart.)	— (Note: "No Comment" did not enter the UK singles chart, but peaked at number four on the UK Singles Sales Chart.)	Non-album singles
"Liars Tale"	2026	79	—	Fenian
"Smugglers & Scholars"	2026	99	—	Fenian
"Fenian"	2026	88	—	Fenian
"Irish Goodbye" (featuring Kae Tempest)	2026	98	—	Fenian
"—" denotes single did not chart in that territory.

=== Other charted songs ===
List of other charted songs, with selected peak chart positions
Title	Year	Peak chart positions	Album
Title	Year	IRL Home.	Album
"3CAG" (featuring Radie Peat)	2024	8	Fine Art
"I bhFiacha Linne"	2025	10	Fine Art

== See also ==
- The Rubberbandits
