= Mo Chara =

Irish rapper, actor, and activist (born 1997)

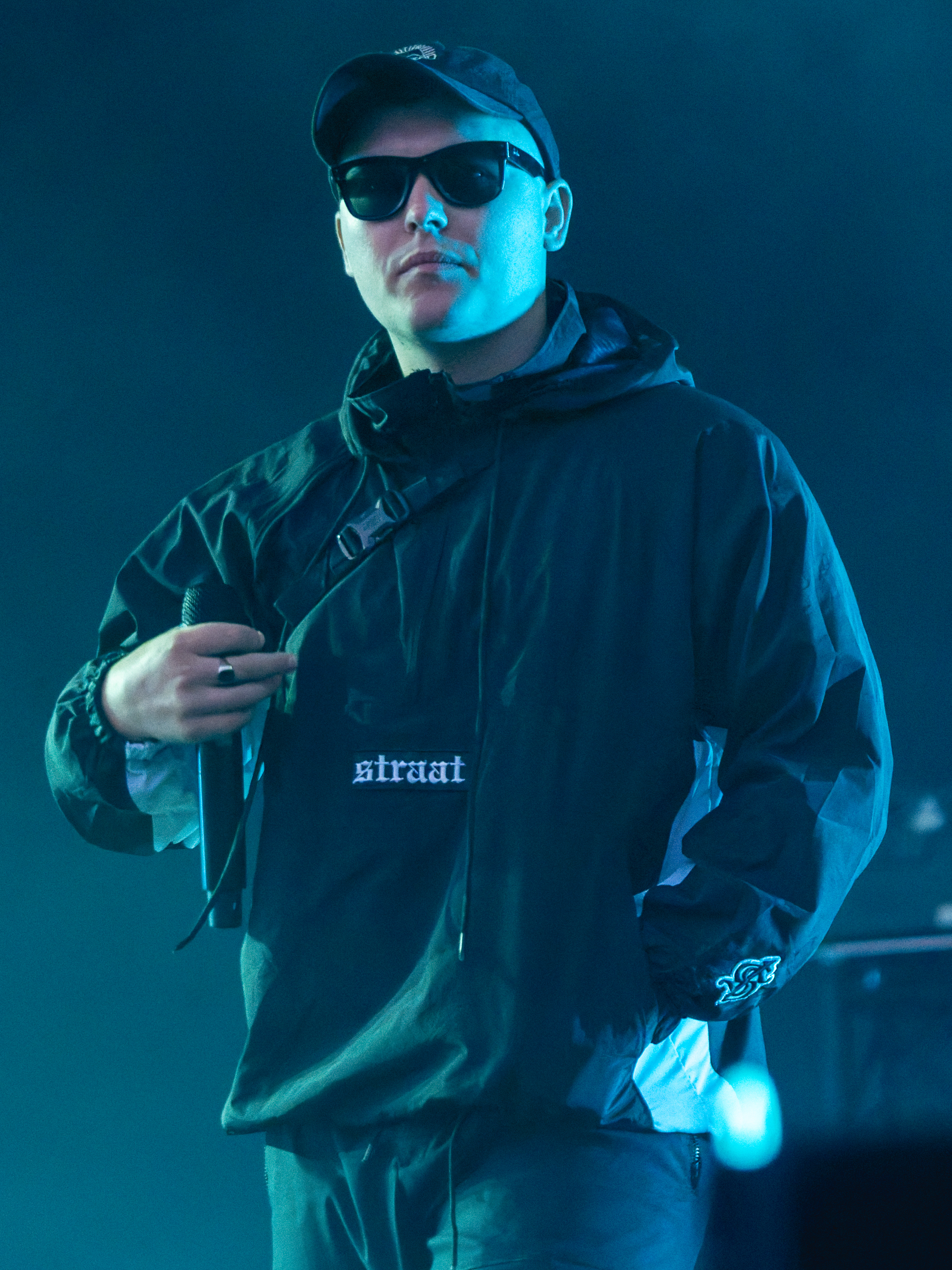
- Mo Chara in May 2025

Background information
- Born: 16 October 1997 (age 28); Belfast, Northern Ireland
- Occupations: Rapper; actor; activist
- Years active: 2017–present
- Member of: Kneecap

Liam Óg Ó hAnnaidh (English: Liam O'Hanna; born 16 October 1997), better known by his stage name Mo Chara ("My Friend" in Irish), is an Irish rapper, actor, and activist from Belfast, Northern Ireland. He is a founding member of the hip hop trio Kneecap, which raps in both Irish and English and is known for its provocative lyrics, political activism, and support for the Irish language.

== Career ==
=== Kneecap ===
Mo Chara co-founded Kneecap in 2017 with Móglaí Bap (Naoise Ó Cairealláin) and DJ Próvaí (JJ Ó Dochartaigh). The group quickly gained notoriety for their energetic performances, satirical and politically charged lyrics, and unapologetic embrace of Irish republican and working-class Belfast youth culture. Their debut single "C.E.A.R.T.A." was released in 2017, followed by the album 3CAG (2018) and Fine Art (2024), both of which received critical acclaim.

Kneecap's music addresses themes such as Irish language rights, anti-colonialism, class, and the legacy of the Troubles, often using humour and irony. The group has also been outspoken in its support of Palestinian nationalism, and has been at the centre of public debates about free speech and political expression in Ireland and the UK.

=== Acting ===
Mo Chara starred as a fictionalised version of himself in the film Kneecap (2024), a comedy-drama directed by Rich Peppiatt that depicts the group's rise and the cultural and political context of contemporary Belfast. The film, which also features Michael Fassbender, won several awards and was praised for its authenticity, humour, and social commentary.

== Political activism ==
Mo Chara and Kneecap are known for their activism in support of the Irish language and Irish Republicanism, as well as their criticism of British government policies in Northern Ireland.

He is also known for his outspoken support for Palestinians. He has spoken against the United Kingdom's alleged complicity in the genocide of Palestinians in the Gaza Strip.

== Legal issues ==
Mo Chara was charged in the UK in May 2025 with a terrorism-related offence under the Terrorism Act 2006 for allegedly waving a Hezbollah flag at a concert in London in November 2024. He denied the charges, saying the flag was thrown on the stage, and that he does not support Hezbollah. Mo Chara and the group stated that they "do not, and have never, supported Hamas or Hezbollah", condemned all attacks on civilians, and alleged footage was "deliberately taken out of all context" as part of a "coordinated smear campaign" over their criticism of "the ongoing genocide against the Palestinian people".

The offence carries up to six months' imprisonment or a fine and a district judge, not a jury, will decide the case. He appeared at Westminster Magistrates' Court on 18 June 2025, and was released on unconditional bail, set to return for a further hearing on 20 August 2025. Following the court appearance, UK Prime Minister Keir Starmer told The Sun that he did not consider Kneecap's planned performance at the Glastonbury Festival on 28 June to be appropriate, citing the seriousness of the charge and the ongoing legal proceedings. The band responded "You know what's 'not appropriate' Keir? Arming a fucking genocide. Fuck The Sun and solidarity with Palestine Action".

He returned to court on 20 August 2025, where his defence argued the charge was brought too late, as he was formally charged on 22 May 2025, one day after the six-month statutory limit. The prosecution contended that the charge was made on 21 May, within the time limit. He requested and was granted an Irish interpreter, despite his ability to speak English fluently. The case was adjourned, with a decision scheduled for 26 September 2025. He then greeted supporters who had gathered outside to thank them, and said in English, "While we’re here, genocide is taking place in Palestine. Free Palestine!"

Chief Magistrate Paul Goldspring ruled on 26 September 2025 that the court had no jurisdiction to try the charge. He declared it "unlawful" and "null" because the Crown Prosecution Service had missed the deadline by a day to get required approvals from the Director of Public Prosecutions and the Attorney General for England and Wales. Northern Ireland First Minister Michelle O'Neill supported the ruling, describing the charges as an "attempt to silence" the band's speaking out against the "genocide in Gaza". The prosecution appealed the dismissal to the High Court of Justice, which rejected the appeal in March 2026.

== Personal life ==
Mo Chara grew up in West Belfast, an area with a strong Irish language revival movement and a history of political activism. He is fluent in Irish and English and is regarded as a prominent figure in the contemporary Irish-language music scene.

== Filmography ==
- Kneecap (2024) – as himself

== Awards ==
- Irish Film and Television Academy (IFTA) Award for Best Director (Kneecap, 2024; shared with cast and crew)
- BAFTA Award for Kneecap (2024; as cast member)

== See also ==
- Irish hip hop
