= List of top 10 singles in 2026 (Ireland) =

Top songs in Ireland in 2026

This is a list of singles that have peaked in the top 10 of the Irish Singles Chart in 2026, as compiled by the Official Charts Company on behalf of the Irish Recorded Music Association.

== Top 10 singles ==
Artist(s)	Single	Peak	Peak date	Weeks at #1	Ref.
Dave and Tems	"Raindance"	6	2 January	-	
Zach Bryan	"Plastic Cigarette"	5	16 January	-	
Zach Bryan	"Say Why"	7	23 January	-	
Harry Styles	"Aperture"	1	30 January	1	
Noah Kahan	"The Great Divide"	1	6 February	1	
Bad Bunny	"DTMF"	2	13 February	-	
Sam Fender and Olivia Dean	"Rein Me In"	1	13 February	18	
Sombr	"Homewrecker"	4	20 February	-	
Milky	"Just the Way You Are"	9	27 February	-	
PinkPantheress and Zara Larsson	"Stateside"	3	27 February	-	
Kingfishr	"The Blade"	8	6 March	-	
Alex Warren	"Fever Dream"	5	6 March	-	
Bella Kay	"Iloveitiloveitiloveit"	1	6 March	3	
Harry Styles	"Taste Back"	7	13 March	-	
Harry Styles	"American Girls"	3	13 March	-	
Noah Kahan	"Porch Light"	8	20 March	-	
Dominic Fike	"Babydoll"	6	10 April	-	
Dominic Fike	"White Keys"	5	3 April	-	
Ella Langley	"Choosin' Texas"	1	8 May	3	
Tame Impala	"Dracula"	3	17 April	-	
Olivia Rodrigo	"Drop Dead"	1	24 April	2	
Justin Bieber featuring Nicki Minaj	"Beauty and a Beat"	2	24 April	-	
Justin Bieber	"Daisies"	3	24 April	-	
Noah Kahan	"Doors"	3	1 May	-	
Michael Jackson	"Billie Jean"	2	15 May	-	
Michael Jackson	"Beat It"	5	15 May	-	
Michael Jackson	"Don't Stop 'Til You Get Enough"	6	15 May	-	
Drake	"National Treasures"	3	22 May	-	
Drake	"Janice STFU"	5	22 May	-	
Drake	"Make Them Cry"	10	22 May	-	
Olivia Rodrigo	"The Cure"	1	29 May	1	
Kingfishr	"The Sun Will Never Settle"	1	5 June	2	
Ariana Grande	"Hate That I Made You Love Me"	3	5 June	-	
Taylor Swift	"I Knew It, I Knew You"	2	12 June	-	
Olivia Rodrigo	"Stupid Song"	1	19 June	1	
Stella Lefty	"Boston"	8	10 July	-	
Prospa and Cloonee	"Free Your Mind"	10	10 July	-	
Anotr/54 Ultra	"Talk to You"	8	17 July	-	
Amble	"Lonely Island"	9	17 July	-	
Shakra and Burna Boy	"Dai Dai"	3	31 July	-	
The Saw Doctors	"Green and Red of Mayo"	6	31 July	-	
Glen Hansard	"Falling Slowly"	7	7 August	-	
Ariana Grande	"Petal"	9	7 August	-	
Dolly Parton	"Jolene"	7	4 September	-	
Dolly Parton	"9 to 5"	8	4 September	-	
Amble	"The Swell"	1	11 September	2	
Fontaines D.C.	"Marianne"	2	11 September	-	
Sienna Spiro	"Great Expectation"	2	18 September	-	
Adéla	"Ain't in LA"	9	18 September	-	
Sombr	"My Body Isn't Ready"	1	25 September	2	
Noah Kahan	"Willing and Able"	6	25 September	-	
Adéla	"Nicole Kidman"	6	16 October	-	
Taylor Swift	"Patient Zero"	1	2 October	1	
Taylor Swift	"Cleveland!"	9	2 October	-	
Taylor Swift	"Babylon"	10	2 October	-	
Ashe	"Stop the Wedding!"	1	9 October	2	
Noah Kahan	"Draw You Out"	9	9 October	-	
Tate McRae	"Housewife"	1	23 October	3	
Olivia Rodrigo featuring Chappell Roan	"Expectation"	2	23 October	-	
Zach Bryan featuring Lana Del Rey	"Lies"	3	23 October	-	
Fontaines D.C.	"Japan"	5	23 October	-	
Fontaines D.C.	"Where Is Gone?" with Rosalía	6	23 October	-	
Zach Bryan	"Lodi When"	8	23 October	-	
Bobby "Boris" Pickett and the Crypt-Kickers	"Monster Mash"	7	6 November	-	
Michael Jackson	"Thriller"	8	6 November	-	
Ray Parker Jr.	"Ghostbusters"	10	6 November	-	
Jamie Miller	"Babydoll"	1	13 November	1	
Abigail Rose/Weston Hunter	"Betty's in the Band"	6	20 November	-	

== Entries by artist ==
The following table shows artists who achieved two or more top 10 entries in 2026. The figures include both main artists and featured artists and the peak position in brackets.

Entries	Artist	Songs
5	Noah Kahan	"The Great Divide" (1), Porch Light" (8), "Doors" (3), "Willing and Able" (6), "Draw You Out" (9)
4	Taylor Swift	"I Knew It, I Knew You" (2) , "Patient Zero" (1), "Cleveland" (9), "Babylon" (10)
4	Olivia Rodrigo	"Drop Dead" (1), "The Cure" (1), "Stupid Song" (1), "Expectation" (2)
4	Zach Bryan	"Say Why" (7), "Plastic Cigarette" (5), "Lies" (3), "Lodi When" (8)
4	Michael Jackson	"Billie Jean" (2), "Beat It" (5), "Don't Stop 'Til You Get Enough" (6) "Thriller" (8)
3	Harry Styles	"Aperture" (1), "Taste Back (7)", "American Girls" (3)
3	Drake	"National Treasures" (3), "Janice STFU" (5), "Make Them Cry" (10)
3	Fontaines D.C.	"Marianne" (2), "Japan" (5), "Where Is Gone? (6)
2	Dominic Fike	"White Keys" (5), "Babydoll" (6)
2	Justin Bieber	"Beauty and a Beat" (2), "Daisies" (3)
2	Kingfishr	"The Blade" (8), "The Sun Will Never Settle" (1)
2	Amble	"The Swell" (1), "Lonely Island" (9)
2	Ariana Grande	"Hate That I Made You Love Me" (3), "Petal" (9)
2	Dolly Parton	"Jolene" (7), "9 to 5" (8)
2	Sombr	"Homewrecker" (4), "My Body Isn't Ready" (1)
2	Adéla	"Ain't in LA" (9), "Nicole Kidman" (6)

== See also ==
- 2026 in music
- List of number-one singles of 2026 (Ireland)
