= Fontaines D.C. discography =

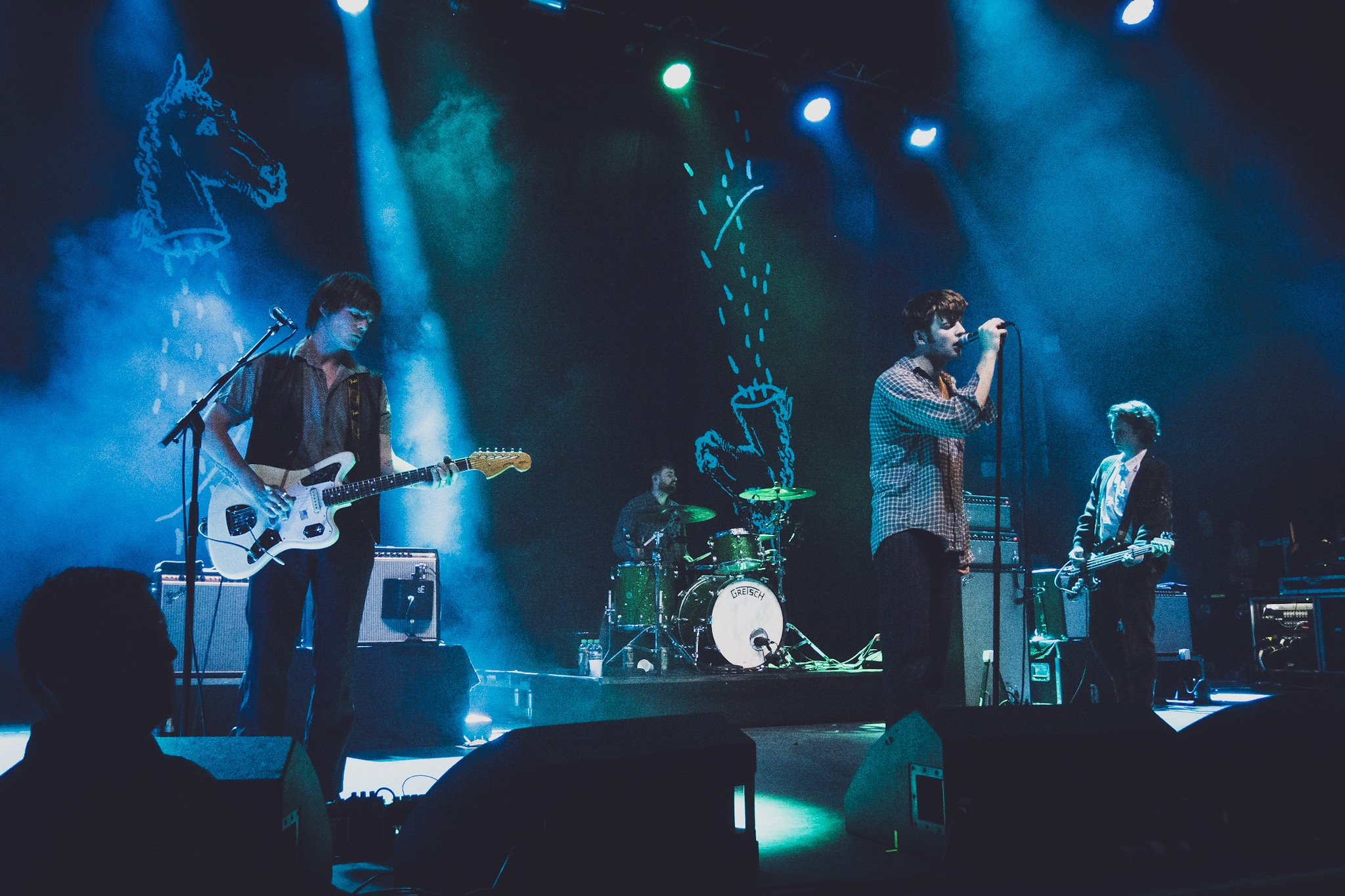
- Fontaines D.C. in 2019
- Studio albums: 5
- EPs: 1
- Live albums: 1
- Singles: 28

Irish rock band Fontaines D.C. have released five studio albums, one live album, one extended play (EP), and 28 singles. Their first album, Dogrel, was released in 2019, and made the top 5 of the albums chart in Ireland and the top 10 in the UK. Second album A Hero's Death followed in 2020, and reached number 2 in both Ireland and the UK. The band's third album Skinty Fia was their first album to top the charts in Ireland and the UK, and spawned the internationally charting singles "Jackie Down the Line", "I Love You" and "Roman Holiday". Fourth album Romance was released in 2024 and reached the top 2 in Ireland and the UK and became their first release to enter the US Billboard 200, peaking at number 97. It was supported by the singles "Starburster", "Favourite", "Here's the Thing", "In the Modern World" and "Bug". Dopamine Chamber, the band's fifth album, was released in 2026 and topped the charts in Ireland, the UK, Australia and the Netherlands, among other countries, and reached the top 20 of the Billboard 200. It contains the singles "Marianne", "Tongue" and "Where Is Gone?" (the lattermost a duet with Spanish singer Rosalía).

== Albums ==
=== Studio albums ===
List of studio albums, with selected chart positions and sales shown
Title	Album details	Peak chart positions										Sales	Certifications
Title	Album details	IRE	AUS	BEL (FL)	BEL (WA)	FRA	GER	NLD	SCO	UK	US	Sales	Certifications
Dogrel	Released: 12 April 2019; Label: Partisan; Formats: CD, LP, cassette, digital download, streaming	4	—	88	163	75	92	93	4	9	— (Note: Dogrel did not enter the US Billboard 200, but peaked at number 14 on the Heatseekers Albums chart.)	UK: 145,172 (as of October 2026)	BPI: Gold
A Hero's Death	Released: 31 July 2020; Label: Partisan; Formats: CD, LP, cassette, digital download, streaming	2	26	9	8	28	14	12	1	2	— (Note: A Hero's Death did not enter the US Billboard 200, but peaked at number 2 on the Heatseekers Albums chart.)	UK: 95,774 (as of October 2026)	BPI: Silver
Skinty Fia	Released: 22 April 2022; Label: Partisan; Formats: CD, LP, cassette, digital download, streaming	1	24	4	3	7	5	2	1	1	— (Note: Skinty Fia did not enter the US Billboard 200, but peaked at number 3 on the Heatseekers Albums chart.)	UK: 206,493 (as of October 2026)	BPI: Gold
Romance	Released: 23 August 2024; Label: XL; Formats: CD, LP, cassette, digital download, streaming	2	6	2	2	3	6	2	2	2	97	UK: 350,882 (as of October 2026)	BPI: Platinum
Dopamine Chamber	Released: 16 October 2026; Label: XL; Formats: CD, LP, cassette, digital download, streaming	1	1	1	2	3	2	1	1	1	14	UK: 70,105 (as of October 2026)	BPI: Gold
"—" denotes a recording that did not chart.

=== Live albums ===
List of live albums, with selected chart positions
Title	Album details	Peak chart positions							Sales
Title	Album details	IRE	AUS Vinyl	NLD Vinyl	SCO	UK	UK Indie	US Heat	Sales
Fontaines D.C. Live at Kilmainham Gaol	Released: 12 June 2021; Label: Partisan; Formats: LP	7	19	16	10	42	4	20	UK: 4,184 (as of October 2026)

== EPs ==
List of EPs, with selected chart positions
Title	EP details	Peak chart positions
Title	EP details	UK Vinyl
Skinty Fia Sessions	Released: 12 February 2022; Label: Partisan; Formats: 10"	28

== Singles ==
Title	Year	Peak chart positions										Certifications	Album
Title	Year	IRE	BEL (FL)	CAN Rock	LTU	NLD Tip	NZ Hot	SPA	UK	UK Indie	US Rock	Certifications	Album
"Liberty Belle"	2017	—	—	—	—	—	—	—	—	—	—		Non-album singles
"Hurricane Laughter / Winter in the Sun"	2017	—	—	—	—	—	—	—	—	—	—		Non-album singles
"Chequeless Reckless / Boys in the Better Land"	2018	—	—	—	—	—	—	—	—	—	—		Non-album singles
"Too Real"	2018	—	— (Note: "Too Real" did not enter the Flanders Ultratop Top 50, but charted as an extra tip on the Flanders Ultratop Bubbling Under chart.)	—	—	—	—	—	— (Note: "Too Real" did not enter the UK Singles Chart, but peaked at number two on the UK Physical Singles Chart.)	—	—		Dogrel
"Big"	2019	—	— (Note: "Big" did not enter the Flanders Ultratop Top 50, but charted as an extra tip on the Flanders Ultratop Bubbling Under chart.)	—	—	—	—	—	—	—	—		Dogrel
"Roy's Tune"	2019	—	—	—	—	—	—	—	—	—	—		Dogrel
"Boys in the Better Land" (re-release)	2019	— (Note: "Boys in the Better Land" did not enter the Irish Singles Chart, but peaked at number 18 on the Irish Homegrown Top 20 chart.)	— (Note: "Boys in the Better Land" did not enter the Flanders Ultratop Top 50, but charted as an extra tip on the Flanders Ultratop Bubbling Under chart.)	—	—	—	—	—	—	—	—	BPI: Silver	Dogrel
"A Hero's Death"	2020	90	— (Note: "A Hero's Death" did not enter the Flanders Ultratop Top 50, but charted as an extra tip on the Flanders Ultratop Bubbling Under chart.)	—	—	—	—	—	— (Note: "A Hero's Death" did not enter the UK Singles Chart, but peaked at number 23 on the UK Singles Sales Chart.)	—	—		A Hero's Death
"I Don't Belong"	2020	86	—	—	—	—	—	—	—	—	—		A Hero's Death
"Televised Mind"	2020	— (Note: "Televised Mind" did not enter the Irish Singles Chart, but peaked at number seven on the Irish Homegrown Top 20 chart.)	—	—	—	—	—	—	— (Note: "Televised Mind" did not enter the UK Singles Chart, but peaked at number 59 on the UK Singles Sales Chart.)	—	—		A Hero's Death
"A Lucid Dream"	2020	84	— (Note: "A Lucid Dream" did not enter the Flanders Ultratop Top 50, but peaked at number 26 on the Flanders Ultratip Bubbling Under chart.)	—	—	—	—	—	—	—	—		A Hero's Death
"A Hero's Death (Soulwax Remix)"	2021	—	— (Note: "A Hero's Death (Soulwax Remix)" did not enter the Flanders Ultratop Top 50, but peaked at number 32 on the Flanders Ultratip Bubbling Under chart.)	—	—	—	—	—	—	—	—		Non-album singles
"Televised Mind (Dave Clarke Remix)"	2021	—	—	—	—	—	—	—	—	—	—		Non-album singles
"A Lucid Dream (Live Version)"	2021	— (Note: "A Lucid Dream" did not enter the Irish Singles Chart, but peaked at number 14 on the Irish Homegrown Top 20 chart.)	—	—	—	—	—	—	—	—	—		Non-album singles
"Jackie Down the Line"	2022	66	—	—	—	—	—	—	—	—	— (Note: "Jackie Down the Line" did not enter the Hot Rock & Alternative Songs chart, but peaked at number 40 on the Adult Alternative Airplay chart.)	BPI: Gold	Skinty Fia
"I Love You"	2022	20	—	—	34	—	—	—	—	11	—	BPI: Platinum	Skinty Fia
"Skinty Fia"	2022	— (Note: "Skinty Fia" did not enter the Irish Singles Chart, but peaked at number three on the Irish Homegrown Top 20 chart.)	—	—	—	—	—	—	—	—	—		Skinty Fia
"Roman Holiday"	2022	36	—	—	—	—	—	—	100	36	— (Note: "Roman Holiday" did not enter the Hot Rock & Alternative Songs chart, but peaked at number 35 on the Adult Alternative Airplay chart.)	BPI: Gold	Skinty Fia
"Cello Song"	2023	— (Note: "Cello Song" did not enter the Irish Singles Chart, but peaked at number five on the Irish Homegrown Top 20 chart.)	—	—	—	—	—	—	— (Note: "Cello Song" did not enter the UK Singles Chart, but peaked at number 23 on the UK Singles Sales Chart.)	—	—		The Endless Coloured Ways: The Songs of Nick Drake
"Starburster"	2024	11	—	12	—	—	40	—	57	4	— (Note: "Starburster" did not enter the Hot Rock & Alternative Songs chart, but peaked at number 22 on the Rock & Alternative Airplay chart.)	BPI: Platinum; RMNZ: Gold	Romance
"Favourite"	2024	13	—	33	—	—	—	—	64	11	— (Note: "Favourite" did not enter the Hot Rock & Alternative Songs chart, but peaked at number 27 on the Rock & Alternative Airplay chart.)	BPI: Platinum	Romance
"Here's the Thing"	2024	43	—	—	—	—	—	—	—	17	—	BPI: Silver	Romance
"In the Modern World"	2024	34	—	—	—	— (Note: "In the Modern World" did not enter the Netherlands' Single Top 100 but peaked at number 20 on the Netherlands' Airplay Chart.)	37	—	52	9	—	BPI: Silver	Romance
"Bug"	2024	15	—	—	—	—	31	—	60	12	—	BPI: Gold	Romance
"It's Amazing to Be Young"	2025	20	50	—	—	—	17	—	39	7	— (Note: "It's Amazing to Be Young" did not enter the Hot Rock & Alternative Songs chart, but peaked at number 18 on the Rock & Alternative Airplay chart.)		Romance (Deluxe Edition)
"Marianne"	2026	2	46	17	75	22	16	—	12	1	41		Dopamine Chamber
"Tongue"	2026	17	—	—	—	—	17	—	51	9	—		Dopamine Chamber
"Where Is Gone?" (with Rosalía)	2026	6	47	—	71	8	—	66	57	6	—		Dopamine Chamber
"—" denotes a recording that did not chart or was not released in that territory.

== Other charted songs ==
Title	Year	Peak chart positions									Album
Title	Year	IRE	GRE Int.	JPN Over.	NZ Hot	PRT	UK	UK Indie	UK Rock	US Rock	Album
"In ár gCroíthe go deo"	2022	80	—	—	—	—	—	—	—	—	Skinty Fia
"How Cold Love Is"	2022	— (Note: "How Cold Love Is" did not enter the Irish Singles Chart, but peaked at number 13 on the Irish Homegrown Top 20 chart.)	—	—	—	—	—	—	—	—	Skinty Fia
"Romance"	2024	—	—	—	33	—	—	29	24	—	Romance
"Desire"	2024	—	—	—	34	—	—	35	—	—	Romance
"Motorcycle Boy"	2024	—	—	—	—	—	—	45	—	—	Romance
"Death Kink"	2024	—	—	—	—	—	—	47	—	—	Romance
"Before You I Just Forget"	2025	—	—	—	—	—	— (Note: "Before You I Just Forget" did not enter the UK Singles Chart, but peaked at number 72 on the UK Singles Sales Chart.)	48	—	—	Romance (Deluxe Edition)
"Starburster" / "In Heaven (Lady in the Radiator Song)"	2025	— (Note: "Starburster" / "In Heaven (Lady in the Radiator Song)" did not enter the Irish Singles Chart, but peaked at number 18 on the Irish Homegrown Top 20 chart.)	—	—	—	—	—	—	—	—	Romance (Deluxe Edition)
"Black Boys on Mopeds"	2026	— (Note: "Black Boys on Mopeds" did not enter the Irish Singles Chart, but peaked at number four on the Irish Homegrown Top 20 chart.)	—	—	—	—	—	—	—	—	Help(2)
"Six Shot Morning"	2026	—	64	—	12	85	— (Note: "Six Shot Morning" did not enter the UK Singles Chart, but peaked at number 44 on the UK Streaming Chart.)	8	—	—	Dopamine Chamber
"Mimesis"	2026	11	34	—	11	62	34	5	—	—	Dopamine Chamber
"Happy for You"	2026	—	74	—	—	91	— (Note: "Happy for You" did not enter the UK Singles Chart, but peaked at number 54 on the UK Streaming Chart.)	11	—	—	Dopamine Chamber
"Demolition"	2026	—	63	—	13	100	18	4	—	—	Dopamine Chamber
"One Man"	2026	—	—	—	—	145	— (Note: "One Man" did not enter the UK Singles Chart, but peaked at number 76 on the UK Streaming Chart.)	14	—	—	Dopamine Chamber
"You Miss Me"	2026	—	86	—	—	128	— (Note: "You Miss Me" did not enter the UK Singles Chart, but peaked at number 72 on the UK Streaming Chart.)	13	—	—	Dopamine Chamber
"Japan"	2026	5	43	14	10	66	14	3	—	49	Dopamine Chamber
"Intimate"	2026	—	—	—	—	—	—	19	—	—	Dopamine Chamber
"—" denotes a recording that did not chart or was not released in that territory.

== Guest appearances ==
Title	Year	Other artist(s)	Album	Credit(s)
"Ugly"	2023	Slowthai	Ugly	Featured artist
