= List of number-one singles of 2026 (Ireland) =

The Irish Singles Chart ranks the best-performing singles in Ireland, as compiled by the Official Charts Company on behalf of the Irish Recorded Music Association.

== Chart history ==
Issue date	Song	Artist(s)	Reference
2 January	"Killeagh"	Kingfishr	
9 January	"Killeagh"	Kingfishr	
16 January	"Killeagh"	Kingfishr	
23 January	"Killeagh"	Kingfishr	
30 January	"Aperture"	Harry Styles	
6 February	"The Great Divide"	Noah Kahan	
13 February	"Rein Me In"	Sam Fender and Olivia Dean	
20 February	"Rein Me In"	Sam Fender and Olivia Dean	
27 February	"Rein Me In"	Sam Fender and Olivia Dean	
6 March	"Iloveitiloveitiloveit"	Bella Kay	
13 March	"Iloveitiloveitiloveit"	Bella Kay	
20 March	"Iloveitiloveitiloveit"	Bella Kay	
27 March	"Rein Me In"	Sam Fender and Olivia Dean	
3 April	"Rein Me In"	Sam Fender and Olivia Dean	
10 April	"Rein Me In"	Sam Fender and Olivia Dean	
17 April	"Rein Me In"	Sam Fender and Olivia Dean	
24 April	"Drop Dead"	Olivia Rodrigo	
1 May	"Drop Dead"	Olivia Rodrigo	
8 May	"Choosin' Texas"	Ella Langley	
15 May	"Choosin' Texas"	Ella Langley	
22 May	"Choosin' Texas"	Ella Langley	
29 May	"The Cure"	Olivia Rodrigo	
5 June	"The Sun Will Never Settle"	Kingfishr	
12 June	"The Sun Will Never Settle"	Kingfishr	
19 June	"Stupid Song"	Olivia Rodrigo	
26 June	"Rein Me In"	Sam Fender and Olivia Dean	
3 July	"Rein Me In"	Sam Fender and Olivia Dean	
10 July	"Rein Me In"	Sam Fender and Olivia Dean	
17 July	"Rein Me In"	Sam Fender and Olivia Dean	
24 July	"Rein Me In"	Sam Fender and Olivia Dean	
31 July	"Rein Me In"	Sam Fender and Olivia Dean	
7 August	"Rein Me In"	Sam Fender and Olivia Dean	
14 August	"Rein Me In"	Sam Fender and Olivia Dean	
21 August	"Rein Me In"	Sam Fender and Olivia Dean	
28 August	"Rein Me In"	Sam Fender and Olivia Dean	
4 September	"Rein Me In"	Sam Fender and Olivia Dean	
11 September	"The Swell"	Amble	
18 September	"The Swell"	Amble	
25 September	"My Body Isn't Ready"	Sombr	
2 October	"Patient Zero"	Taylor Swift	
9 October	"Stop the Wedding!"	Ashe	
16 October	"Stop the Wedding!"	Ashe	
23 October	"Housewife"	Tate McRae	
30 October	"Housewife"	Tate McRae	
6 November	"Housewife"	Tate McRae	
13 November	"Babydoll"	Jamie Miller	
20 November	"My Body Isn't Ready"	Sombr	

== Number-one artists ==
Position	Artist	Weeks at No. 1
1	Sam Fender	18
1	Olivia Dean	18
2	Kingfishr	6
3	Olivia Rodrigo	4
4	Bella Kay	3
4	Ella Langley	3
4	Tate McRae	3
5	Amble	2
5	Ashe	2
5	Sombr	2
6	Harry Styles	1
6	Noah Kahan	1
6	Taylor Swift	1
6	Jamie Miller	1

== See also ==
- List of number-one albums of 2026 (Ireland)
- List of top 10 singles in 2026 (Ireland)
