= List of Irish Independent Albums Chart number ones of 2026 =

This is a list of albums that reached number-one on the Irish Independent Albums Chart in 2026. The charts were compiled by Irish Recorded Music Association (IRMA).

== Chart history ==
List of Irish Independent Albums Chart number-one albums of 2026
| Issue date | Album | Artist | Label(s) | Ref |
|---|---|---|---|---|
| 2 January | Romance | Fontaines D.C. | XL | |
| 9 January | Rebel | EsDeeKid | Lizzy/XV | |
| 16 January | Rebel | EsDeeKid | Lizzy/XV | |
| 23 January | Rebel | EsDeeKid | Lizzy/XV | |
| 30 January | It's a Hell of an Age | Madra Salach | Madra Salach | |
| 6 February | West End Girl | Lily Allen | BMG | |
| 13 February | Debí Tirar Más Fotos | Bad Bunny | Rimas | |
| 20 February | Debí Tirar Más Fotos | Bad Bunny | Rimas | |
| 27 February | Debí Tirar Más Fotos | Bad Bunny | Rimas | |
| 6 March | The Mountain | Gorillaz | Kong | |
| 13 March | The Mountain | Gorillaz | Kong | |
| 20 March | Romance | Fontaines D.C. | XL | |
| 27 March | Romance | Fontaines D.C. | XL | |
| 3 April | This Music May Contain Hope | Raye | Human Re Sources | |
| 10 April | This Music May Contain Hope | Raye | Human Re Sources | |
| 17 April | This Music May Contain Hope | Raye | Human Re Sources | |
| 24 April | This Music May Contain Hope | Raye | Human Re Sources | |
| 1 May | This Music May Contain Hope | Raye | Human Re Sources | |
| 8 May | Fenian | Kneecap | Heavenly | |
| 15 May | Fenian | Kneecap | Heavenly | |
| 22 May | Fenian | Kneecap | Heavenly | |
| 29 May | The House Must Win | Mick Flannery | One Riot | |
| 5 June | Inferno | Boards of Canada | Warp | |
| 12 June | Euro-Country | CMAT | CMAtbaby/AWAL | |
| 19 June | Euro-Country | CMAT | CMAtbaby/AWAL | |
| 26 June | Euro-Country | CMAT | CMAtbaby/AWAL | |
| 3 July | West End Girl | Lily Allen | BMG | |
| 10 July | Romance | Fontaines D.C. | XL | |
| 17 July | Romance | Fontaines D.C. | XL | |
| 24 July | Romance | Fontaines D.C. | XL | |
| 31 July | To Win Just Once / The Best of the Saw Doctors | The Saw Doctors | Universal Ireland | |
| 7 August | Holy | Dave Lofts | B-Unique | |
| 14 August | Affirmations | Really Good Time | Chromer Industrial | |
| 21 August | The User's Guide to Being Human | The Script | BMG | |
| 28 August | Lost Weekend | Phoebe Bridgers | Dead Oceans | |
| 4 September | Romance | Fontaines D.C. | XL | |
| 11 September | Romance | Fontaines D.C. | XL | |
| 18 September | Romance | Fontaines D.C. | XL | |
| 25 September | Paddywhackery | The Mary Wallopers | BC | |
| 2 October | One More for the Road | Keywest | Marshall | |
| 9 October | Romance | Fontaines D.C. | XL | |
| 16 October | Poor Advice | Basht | LAB | |
| 23 October | Dopamine Chamber | Fontaines D.C. | XL | |
| 30 October | Dopamine Chamber | Fontaines D.C. | XL | |
| 6 November | Dopamine Chamber | Fontaines D.C. | XL | |
| 13 November | Dopamine Chamber | Fontaines D.C. | XL | |
| 20 November | Dopamine Chamber | Fontaines D.C. | XL | |

== See also ==
- List of number-one albums of 2026 (Ireland)
- List of number-one singles of 2026 (Ireland)
