= List of Irish Independent Albums Chart number ones of 2025 =

This is a list of albums that reached number-one on the Irish Independent Albums Chart in 2025. The charts were compiled by Irish Recorded Music Association (IRMA).

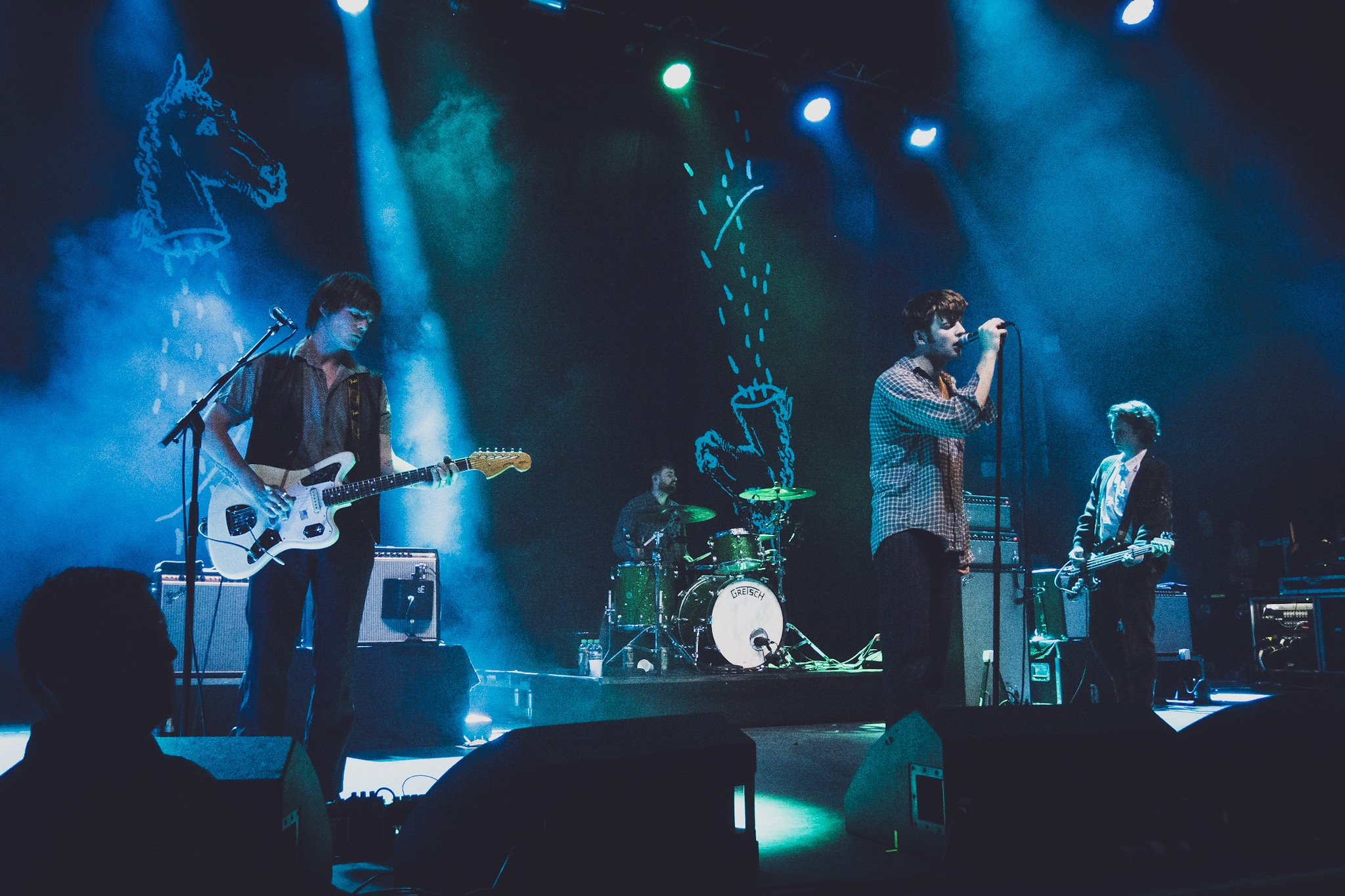
Fontaines D.C.'s fourth album, Romance, reached number one 34 non-consecutive weeks in 2025

== Chart history ==
List of Irish Independent Albums Chart number-one albums of 2025
Issue date	Album	Artist	Label(s)	Ref
3 January	Romance	Fontaines D.C.	XL	
10 January	Romance	Fontaines D.C.	XL	
17 January	Spooky	Travy	Tape	
24 January	Debí Tirar Más Fotos	Bad Bunny	Rimas	
31 January	Romance	Fontaines D.C.	XL	
7 February	Romance	Fontaines D.C.	XL	
14 February	Romance	Fontaines D.C.	XL	
21 February	Romance	Fontaines D.C.	XL	
28 February	Blindness	The Murder Capital	Human Season	
7 March	Romance	Fontaines D.C.	XL	
14 March	Vice City	Bless	S & C Sound	
21 March	Romance	Fontaines D.C.	XL	
28 March	Romance	Fontaines D.C.	XL	
4 April	Romance	Fontaines D.C.	XL	
11 April	Romance	Fontaines D.C.	XL	
18 April	Romance	Fontaines D.C.	XL	
25 April	Romance	Fontaines D.C.	XL	
2 May	Romance	Fontaines D.C.	XL	
9 May	Romance	Fontaines D.C.	XL	
16 May	Romance	Fontaines D.C.	XL	
23 May	Romance	Fontaines D.C.	XL	
30 May	Romance	Fontaines D.C.	XL	
6 June	Romance	Fontaines D.C.	XL	
13 June	More	Pulp	Rough Trade	
20 June	Romance	Fontaines D.C.	XL	
27 June	Romance	Fontaines D.C.	XL	
4 July	Romance	Fontaines D.C.	XL	
11 July	Romance	Fontaines D.C.	XL	
18 July	Romance	Fontaines D.C.	XL	
25 July	Romance	Fontaines D.C.	XL	
1 August	Romance	Fontaines D.C.	XL	
8 August	Open Water	Cry Before Dawn	CBD	
15 August	Romance	Fontaines D.C.	XL	
22 August	Romance	Fontaines D.C.	XL	
29 August	A Matter of Time	Laufey	Vingolf	
5 September	Euro-Country	CMAT	CMATBaby/AWAL	
12 September	Euro-Country	CMAT	CMATBaby/AWAL	
19 September	Euro-Country	CMAT	CMATBaby/AWAL	
26 September	Euro-Country	CMAT	CMATBaby/AWAL	
3 October	Romance	Fontaines D.C.	XL	
10 October	Archangel	Kettama	Steel City Dance Discs	
17 October	Jamie Duffy	Jamie Duffy	Rubyworks	
24 October	Romance	Fontaines D.C.	XL	
31 October	West End Girl	Lily Allen	BMG	
7 November	West End Girl	Lily Allen	BMG	
14 November	West End Girl	Lily Allen	BMG	
21 November	West End Girl	Lily Allen	BMG	
28 November	Rebel	EsDeeKid	Lizzy/XV	
5 December	Romance	Fontaines D.C.	XL	
12 December	Romance	Fontaines D.C.	XL	
19 December	Romance	Fontaines D.C.	XL	
26 December	Romance	Fontaines D.C.	XL	

== See also ==
- List of number-one albums of 2025 (Ireland)
- List of number-one singles of 2025 (Ireland)
