= List of number-one albums of 2026 (Ireland) =

The Irish Albums Chart ranks the best-performing albums in Ireland, as compiled by the Official Charts Company on behalf of the Irish Recorded Music Association.

== Chart history ==
Issue date	Album	Artist	Reference
2 January	Halcyon	Kingfishr	
9 January	The Art of Loving	Olivia Dean	
16 January	With Heaven on Top	Zach Bryan	
23 January	With Heaven on Top	Zach Bryan	
30 January	The Art of Loving	Olivia Dean	
6 February	The Art of Loving	Olivia Dean	
13 February	The Art of Loving	Olivia Dean	
20 February	The Art of Loving	Olivia Dean	
27 February	The Art of Loving	Olivia Dean	
6 March	The Mountain	Gorillaz	
13 March	Kiss All the Time. Disco, Occasionally.	Harry Styles	
20 March	Kiss All the Time. Disco, Occasionally.	Harry Styles	
27 March	Arirang	BTS	
3 April	The Art of Loving	Olivia Dean	
10 April	The Weight of the Woods	Dermot Kennedy	
17 April	The Art of Loving	Olivia Dean	
24 April	The Art of Loving	Olivia Dean	
1 May	The Great Divide	Noah Kahan	
8 May	Fenian	Kneecap	
15 May	The Essential Michael Jackson	Michael Jackson	
22 May	Iceman	Drake	
29 May	The Essential Michael Jackson	Michael Jackson	
5 June	The Essential Michael Jackson	Michael Jackson	
12 June	Dinner Party	Niall Horan	
19 June	You Seem Pretty Sad for a Girl So in Love	Olivia Rodrigo	
26 June	You Seem Pretty Sad for a Girl So in Love	Olivia Rodrigo	
3 July	You Seem Pretty Sad for a Girl So in Love	Olivia Rodrigo	
10 July	You Seem Pretty Sad for a Girl So in Love	Olivia Rodrigo	
17 July	You Seem Pretty Sad for a Girl So in Love	Olivia Rodrigo	
24 July	Daughter from Hell	Gracie Abrams	
31 July	You Seem Pretty Sad for a Girl So in Love	Olivia Rodrigo	
7 August	Petal	Ariana Grande	
14 August	You Seem Pretty Sad for a Girl So in Love	Olivia Rodrigo	
21 August	The User's Guide to Being Human	The Script	
28 August	The Highlights	The Weeknd	
4 September	The Great Divide	Noah Kahan	
11 September	You Seem Pretty Sad for a Girl So in Love	Olivia Rodrigo	
18 September	You Seem Pretty Sad for a Girl So in Love	Olivia Rodrigo	
25 September	You Seem Pretty Sad for a Girl So in Love	Olivia Rodrigo	
2 October	One More for the Road	Keywest	
9 October	You Seem Pretty Sad for a Girl So in Love	Olivia Rodrigo	
16 October	You Seem Pretty Sad for a Girl So in Love	Olivia Rodrigo	
23 October	Dopamine Chamber	Fontaines D.C.	
30 October	Dopamine Chamber	Fontaines D.C.	
6 November	Dopamine Chamber	Fontaines D.C.	
13 November	Dopamine Chamber	Fontaines D.C.	
20 November	Carnaval de Luz	U2	

== Number-one artists ==
Position	Artist	Weeks at No. 1
1	Olivia Rodrigo	12
2	Olivia Dean	9
3	Fontaines D.C.	4
4	Michael Jackson	3
5	Zach Bryan	2
5	Noah Kahan	2
5	Harry Styles	2
6	Kingfishr	1
6	Gorillaz	1
6	BTS	1
6	Dermot Kennedy	1
6	Kneecap	1
6	Drake	1
6	Niall Horan	1
6	Gracie Abrams	1
6	Ariana Grande	1
6	The Script	1
6	The Weeknd	1
6	Keywest	1
6	U2	1

== See also ==
- List of number-one singles of 2026 (Ireland)
