= My Reckless Abandon =

Studio album by Bella Kay
- Released: July 12, 2026
- Length: 41:11
- Label: Atlantic
- Producers: Alexander 23; Idarose; Thomas LaRosa

Bella Kay chronology
Are You Mad at Me? (2026)	My Reckless Abandon (2026)

Singles from My Reckless Abandon
- 1. "Iloveitiloveitiloveit" Released: January 11, 2026; 2. "Promise" Released: April 26, 2026; 3. "Stop" Released: May 24, 2026

My Reckless Abandon is the debut studio album by the American singer-songwriter Bella Kay. It was released on July 12, 2026, through Bella Kay under exclusive license to Atlantic Records.

== Critical reception ==
My Reckless Abandon ratings
Review scores
Source	Rating
AllMusic	3/5 stars

Neil Z. Yeung of AllMusic described the album as an "earnest and emotionally impactful collection of confessionals and youthful angst" and noting that the album adds "some extra edge" while maintaining Bella Kay's signature "blend of hazy atmospherics and moody production."

== Track listing ==
All tracks are written by Bella Kay and Alexis "Idarose" Kesselman, except where noted.

My Reckless Abandon track listing
No.	Title	Writer(s)	Length
1.	"Blur"		3:46
2.	"Promise?"	Bella Kay; Alexander Glantz	3:12
3.	"Say It Say"		2:42
4.	"Karaoke"		3:45
5.	"Iloveitiloveitiloveit"		3:03
6.	"Stop"		2:56
7.	"SWU"	Kay; Glantz	2:08
8.	"Sleep for Dinner"		3:12
9.	"Mindf*ck"		3:20
10.	"Tongue"	Kay; Thomas LaRosa	2:39
11.	"Marrow"	Kay; Glantz	3:12
12.	"A Father's Lament"		3:59
13.	"I Deserve Better"	Kay; Glantz; Kesselman	3:17
Total length:			41:11

== Personnel ==
Credits are adapted from Tidal.

- Bella Kay – vocals (all tracks), guitar (tracks 5, 9)
- Idarose – production, engineering (1, 3–10, 12, 13); programming, synthesizer (1, 3–6, 8–10, 12); guitar (1, 5, 8–10, 12), additional vocals (6), piano (9), executive production
- Pedro Calloni – mixing
- Matinicus Neveu – mixing assistance
- Samuel Bassani – mixing assistance
- Nathan Dantzler – mastering
- Nathan Pitt – guitar (1–6, 8–10, 12)
- Alexander 23 – production (4, 7, 11, 13)
- Thomas LaRosa – guitar, programming, synthesizer, production, engineering (10)
- Yi-Mei Templeman – cello (11)

== Charts ==
Chart performance for My Reckless Abandon
Chart (2026)	Peak position
Australian Albums (ARIA)	12
Belgian Albums (Ultratop Flanders)	51
Dutch Albums (Album Top 100)	93
Irish Albums (IRMA)	72
New Zealand Albums (RMNZ)	19
Norwegian Albums (VG-lista)	18
Scottish Albums (Official Charts)	31
UK Albums (Official Charts)	50
US Billboard 200	96
