= List of number-one albums of 2025 (Ireland) =

The Irish Albums Chart ranks the best-performing albums in Ireland, as compiled by the Official Charts Company on behalf of the Irish Recorded Music Association.

== Chart history ==
Issue date	Album	Artist	Reference
3 January	Short n' Sweet	Sabrina Carpenter	
10 January	Stick Season	Noah Kahan	
17 January	Spooky	Travy	
24 January	Better Man	Robbie Williams	
31 January	Can't Rush Greatness	Central Cee	
7 February	Hurry Up Tomorrow	The Weeknd	
14 February	Open Wide	Inhaler	
21 February	Short n' Sweet	Sabrina Carpenter	
28 February	So Close to What	Tate McRae	
7 March	Short n' Sweet	Sabrina Carpenter	
14 March	Mayhem	Lady Gaga	
21 March	Short n' Sweet	Sabrina Carpenter	
28 March	Short n' Sweet	Sabrina Carpenter	
4 April	Eternal Sunshine	Ariana Grande	
11 April	Short n' Sweet	Sabrina Carpenter	
18 April	Short n' Sweet	Sabrina Carpenter	
25 April	Short n' Sweet	Sabrina Carpenter	
2 May	Short n' Sweet	Sabrina Carpenter	
9 May	Short n' Sweet	Sabrina Carpenter	
16 May	Maybe It's Fine	Moncrieff	
23 May	So Close to What	Tate McRae	
30 May	Reverie	Amble	
6 June	Reverie	Amble	
13 June	Reverie	Amble	
20 June	Brat	Charli XCX	
27 June	American Heartbreak	Zach Bryan	
4 July	Stick Season	Noah Kahan	
11 July	Time Flies... 1994–2009	Oasis	
18 July	Time Flies... 1994–2009	Oasis	
25 July	You'll Be Alright, Kid (Chapter 1)	Alex Warren	
1 August	Reverie	Amble	
8 August	Little Dreaming	Cian Ducrot	
15 August	Time Flies... 1994–2009	Oasis	
22 August	Time Flies... 1994–2009	Oasis	
29 August	Halcyon	Kingfishr	
5 September	Euro-Country	CMAT	
12 September	Man's Best Friend	Sabrina Carpenter	
19 September	Play	Ed Sheeran	
26 September	Goldrush	Gavin James	
3 October	The Art of Loving	Olivia Dean	
10 October	The Life of a Showgirl	Taylor Swift	
17 October	The Life of a Showgirl	Taylor Swift	
24 October	The Life of a Showgirl	Taylor Swift	
31 October	The Boy Who Played the Harp	Dave	
7 November	The Art of Loving	Olivia Dean	
14 November	The Art of Loving	Olivia Dean	
21 November	The Art of Loving	Olivia Dean	
28 November	The Art of Loving	Olivia Dean	
5 December	The Art of Loving	Olivia Dean	
12 December	Halcyon	Kingfishr	
19 December	Halcyon	Kingfishr	
26 December	Halcyon	Kingfishr	

== Number-one artists ==
Position	Artist	Weeks at No. 1
1	Sabrina Carpenter	11
2	Olivia Dean	6
3	Amble	4
3	Oasis	4
3	Kingfishr	4
4	Taylor Swift	3
5	Tate McRae	2
5	Noah Kahan	2
6	Travy	1
6	Robbie Williams	1
6	Central Cee	1
6	The Weeknd	1
6	Inhaler	1
6	Lady Gaga	1
6	Ariana Grande	1
6	Moncrieff	1
6	Charli XCX	1
6	Zach Bryan	1
6	Alex Warren	1
6	Cian Ducrot	1
6	CMAT	1
6	Ed Sheeran	1
6	Gavin James	1
6	Dave	1

== See also ==
- List of number-one singles of 2025 (Ireland)
