= Live from Dublin =

Live from Dublin may refer to:

== Albums ==
- High on Emotion: Live from Dublin, by Chris de Burgh, 1990
- Live from Dublin: A Tribute to Derek Bell, by The Chieftains, 2005
- Live from Dublin (Kingfishr album), 2024
