= Alexis Kesselman =

- Also known as: Idarose
- Born: Florida
- Occupations: Musician; songwriter; producer
- Years active: 2019–present
- Label: Warner Chappell
- Website: alexiskesselman.com

Alexis Kesselman, also known by her stage name Idarose, is an American singer, songwriter and producer, based in both New York and Los Angeles. She is best known for writing and producing 5 of the 6 Skye Riley songs (performed by Naomi Scott) for the psychological horror movie Smile 2, co-writing Joji's single "Glimpse of Us", and for co-writing and producing Bella Kay's single "iloveitiloveitiloveit".

== Early life ==
Kesselman was born and raised in south Florida. She studied songwriting, film scoring, and production at the Frost School of Music at the University of Miami. In 2016, she was selected to attend the Johnny Mercer Songwriters Project at Northwestern University. She received a master's degree in writing and design for musical theater from Berklee College of Music in New York City.

== Career ==
Kesselman records under the name Idarose, and her 2021 single "When I Don't Have You", generated over 1 million views on TikTok.

As a songwriter and producer, she co-wrote the 2021 song "F Is for Friends" by Tainy, Trevor Daniel, and Becky G for the soundtrack to The SpongeBob Movie: Sponge on the Run. She co-wrote Joji's 2022 single "Glimpse of Us", which went multi-platinum, peaking at number 8 on the Billboard Hot 100, and was number 1 on Spotify's US and Global charts. It was nominated for Song of the Year at the 2022 ARIA Music Awards. In 2023, the song entered Spotify's Billions Club for reaching over a billion streams.

Kesselman wrote and produced five of the six songs on Smile 2: The Skye Riley EP, from the 2024 film Smile 2, with all the songs performed by Naomi Scott as her character Skye Riley. She has also written and produced for artists including Brett Eldredge, Kelly Clarkson, Grace VanderWaal, and Suki Waterhouse.

== Discography ==
=== Singles (as Idarose) ===
- "Talk About Myself" (2018)
- "Psychic" (2019)
- "thanks 2020" feat. The Verneers (2020)
- "When I Don't Have You" (2021)
- "Different People" (2021)
- "Feel Like That" feat. Daniel Allan (2021)

=== Songwriting and production ===
Year	Artist(s)	Album	Song	Credit
2020	Jon Mills feat. Idarose	Wings OST	"First Time"	Writer, vocals
2021	Tainy feat. Trevor Daniel and Becky G	The SpongeBob Movie: Sponge on the Run OST	"F Is for Friends"	Writer
2021	Twice	Celebrate	"Doughnut"	Writer
2022	Joji	Smithereens	"Glimpse of Us"	Writer
2022	Grace VanderWaal	Non-album single	"Lion's Den"	Writer, producer
2023	Rowan Drake	Non-album single	"The Long Breath"	Writer, producer
2024	Naomi Scott	Smile 2: The Skye Riley EP	"New Brain"	Writer, producer
2024	Naomi Scott	Smile 2: The Skye Riley EP	"Just My Name"	Writer, producer
2024	Naomi Scott	Smile 2: The Skye Riley EP	"Blood on White Satin"	Writer, producer
2024	Naomi Scott	Smile 2: The Skye Riley EP	"Death of Me"	Writer, producer
2024	Suki Waterhouse	Memoir of a Sparklemuffin	"Helpless"	Writer
2024	Suki Waterhouse	Memoir of a Sparklemuffin	"Model, Actress, Whatever"	Writer
2024	Suki Waterhouse	Memoir of a Sparklemuffin	"On this Love"	Writer
2024	Suki Waterhouse	Memoir of a Sparklemuffin	"The Bellboy (One Last Crush)"	Writer
2024	Suki Waterhouse	Memoir of a Sparklemuffin	"Everything You Feared"	Writer, producer
2024	Brett Eldredge	Merry Christmas (Welcome to the Family)	"The Night St. Nick Got Sick"	Writer
2024	Brett Eldredge	Merry Christmas (Welcome to the Family)	"Season of Lights and Wonder"	Writer
2024	Brett Eldredge feat. Kelly Clarkson	Merry Christmas (Welcome to the Family)	"Sweet December"	Writer
2024	Brett Eldredge feat. Idarose	Merry Christmas (Welcome to the Family)	"Who Will You Be Kissing on New Year's Eve?"	Writer, vocals
2025	Brett Eldredge	Non-album single	"Gorgeous"	Writer, producer
2025	Lydia Night	Parody of Pleasure	"Pity Party"	Writer, producer
2025	Lydia Night	Parody of Pleasure	"Trust Fall"	Writer, producer
2025	Lydia Night	Parody of Pleasure	"Loaded Gun"	Writer, producer
2025	Lydia Night	Parody of Pleasure	"You Sir"	Producer
2025	Lydia Night	Parody of Pleasure	"The Hearse"	Writer, producer
2025	Lydia Night	Parody of Pleasure	"Love Dumb"	Writer, producer
2025	Lydia Night	Parody of Pleasure	"Gutter"	Writer, producer
2025	Lydia Night	Parody of Pleasure	"Meltdown"	Writer, producer
2025	Lydia Night	Parody of Pleasure	"The Bomb"	Writer, producer
2025	Lydia Night	Parody of Pleasure	"Chameleon"	Writer, producer
2025	Lydia Night	Parody of Pleasure	"Little Doe"	Writer, producer
2025	Lydia Night	Parody of Pleasure	"Puppet"	Writer, producer
2025	Lydia Night	Super Strike OST	"Headshot"	Writer, producer
2025	Sara Kays	Reasons to Call You	"Bench Sitter"	Writer, producer
2025	Wasp Eater	Non-album single	"Once in a Blue Moon"	Writer
2025	King Mala	Non-album single	"Eat the Spoon"	Writer
2025	Storm Ford	Non-album single	"Reception"	Writer
2025	Two Feet	Non-album single	"CPR"	Writer
2025	Meg Smith	Disco Dystopia	"God Damn Baby"	Producer
2025	Meg Smith	Disco Dystopia	"Carlos, Get in the Car!"	Writer, producer
2026	Bella Kay	A Couple Minutes Out	"iloveitiloveitiloveit"	Writer, producer
2026	Bella Kay	A Couple Minutes Out	"Steady"	Writer, producer
2026	Bella Kay	A Couple Minutes Out	"Wonder Wander"	Writer, producer
2026	Bella Kay	My Reckless Abandon	"Blur"	Writer, producer
2026	Bella Kay	My Reckless Abandon	"Promise?"	Producer
2026	Bella Kay	My Reckless Abandon	"Say It Say"	Writer, producer
2026	Bella Kay	My Reckless Abandon	"Karaoke"	Writer, producer
2026	Bella Kay	My Reckless Abandon	"Stop"	Writer, producer
2026	Bella Kay	My Reckless Abandon	"swu"	Producer
2026	Bella Kay	My Reckless Abandon	"Sleep for Dinner"	Writer, producer
2026	Bella Kay	My Reckless Abandon	"Mindfuck"	Producer
2026	Bella Kay	My Reckless Abandon	"Tongue"	Producer
2026	Bella Kay	My Reckless Abandon	"Marrow"	Writer, producer
2026	Bella Kay	My Reckless Abandon	"A Father's Lament"	Writer, producer
2026	Bella Kay	My Reckless Abandon	"I Deserve Better"	Writer, producer
2026	Elliot Greer	Fragments	"Coward"	Producer
2026	Elliot Greer	Fragments	"Richest Man Alive"	Writer, producer
2026	Elliot Greer	Fragments	"Dead"	Producer
2026	Elliot Greer	Fragments	"Fragments"	Writer, producer
2026	Julia Campbell	Non-album single	"Almost Did"	Writer, producer
2026	Alyssa Grace	Non-album single	"Dog With a Bone"	Writer, producer
2026	Alyssa Grace	Bloodstream	"Picking Petals"	Writer, producer
2026	Claire Rosinkranz	My Lover	"Dime"	Writer, producer
2026	Matthew Ifield	Non-album single	"Thinking"	Writer, producer
