= List of number-one singles of 2025 (Ireland) =

The Irish Singles Chart ranks the best-performing singles in Ireland, as compiled by the Official Charts Company on behalf of the Irish Recorded Music Association.

Issue date	Song	Artist	Reference
3 January	"That's So True"	Gracie Abrams	
10 January	"That's So True"	Gracie Abrams	
17 January	"That's So True"	Gracie Abrams	
24 January	"That's So True"	Gracie Abrams	
31 January	"Messy"	Lola Young	
7 February	"Messy"	Lola Young	
14 February	"Messy"	Lola Young	
21 February	"Not Like Us"	Kendrick Lamar	
28 February	"Messy"	Lola Young	
7 March	"That's So True"	Gracie Abrams	
14 March	"That's So True"	Gracie Abrams	
21 March	"Ordinary"	Alex Warren	
28 March	"Ordinary"	Alex Warren	
4 April	"Ordinary"	Alex Warren	
11 April	"Ordinary"	Alex Warren	
18 April	"Ordinary"	Alex Warren	
25 April	"Ordinary"	Alex Warren	
2 May	"Killeagh"	Kingfishr	
9 May	"Killeagh"	Kingfishr	
16 May	"Undressed"	Sombr	
23 May	"Undressed"	Sombr	
30 May	"Undressed"	Sombr	
6 June	"Undressed"	Sombr	
13 June	"Manchild"	Sabrina Carpenter	
20 June	"Manchild"	Sabrina Carpenter	
27 June	"Nine Ball"	Zach Bryan	
4 July	"Manchild"	Sabrina Carpenter	
11 July	"Manchild"	Sabrina Carpenter	
18 July	"Manchild"	Sabrina Carpenter	
25 July	"Killeagh"	Kingfishr	
1 August	"Killeagh"	Kingfishr	
8 August	"Killeagh"	Kingfishr	
15 August	"Killeagh"	Kingfishr	
22 August	"Killeagh"	Kingfishr	
29 August	"Killeagh"	Kingfishr	
5 September	"Killeagh"	Kingfishr	
12 September	"Killeagh"	Kingfishr	
19 September	"Man I Need"	Olivia Dean	
26 September	"Man I Need"	Olivia Dean	
3 October	"Man I Need"	Olivia Dean	
10 October	"The Fate of Ophelia"	Taylor Swift	
17 October	"The Fate of Ophelia"	Taylor Swift	
24 October	"The Fate of Ophelia"	Taylor Swift	
31 October	"The Fate of Ophelia"	Taylor Swift	
7 November	"The Fate of Ophelia"	Taylor Swift	
14 November	"The Fate of Ophelia"	Taylor Swift	
21 November	"The Fate of Ophelia"	Taylor Swift	
28 November	"The Fate of Ophelia"	Taylor Swift	
5 December	"The Fate of Ophelia"	Taylor Swift	
12 December	"Killeagh"	Kingfishr	
19 December	"Killeagh"	Kingfishr	
26 December	"Killeagh"	Kingfishr	

== Number-one artists ==
Position	Artist	Weeks at No. 1
1	Kingfishr	13
2	Taylor Swift	9
3	Alex Warren	6
3	Gracie Abrams	6
4	Sabrina Carpenter	5
5	Lola Young	4
5	Sombr	4
6	Olivia Dean	3
7	Kendrick Lamar	1
7	Zach Bryan	1

== See also ==
- List of number-one albums of 2025 (Ireland)
- List of top 10 singles in 2025 (Ireland)
