= Madra Salach =

Irish neo-traditional folk band

- Origin: Dublin, Ireland
- Genres: Irish folk; Irish traditional music; Celtic music
- Works: It's a Hell of an Age - EP (2026); Gorta - Album (2027)
- Years active: 2023–present
- Members: Maxime Arnold; Paul Banks; Adam Cullen; Dara Duffy; Jack Lawlor; Jack Martin

Madra Salach [ˈmˠad̪ˠɾˠə ˈsˠal̪ˠəx] (English: Dirty Dog) is an Irish contemporary-folk band based in Dublin founded in 2023. Formed by founding members Paul Banks, Adam Cullen and Dara Duffy as they played gigs across various venues in the Northside of Dublin. Three additional members joined to complete the group, with Maxime Arnold, Jack Lawlor and Jack Martin rounding off the six-piece group. Madra Salach have played multiple festivals such as All Together Now and Electric Picnic, shows, and released their debut EP, It's a Hell of an Age in January 2026.

== Career ==
Madra Salach started with its three founding members — Paul Banks, Adam Cullen, and Dara Duffy — forming a trad band and playing in pubs and small venues across the Northside of Dublin. Banks began talking separately with a future band-member Jack Martin about contemporary Irish bands and fusing contemporary sound into their music, the two projects combined and make up the group's distinct contemporary folk blend. Following a spate of pub and small venue gigs, alongside a successful festival season in 2025, the group got together to record their debut EP. Their music is influenced by The Pogues.

Madra Salach's debut-single, "Blue & Gold" was released on September 18, 2025. This would be the first of two singles to be released as a preview to their debut-EP. Their second single, "I Was Just A Boy" debuted on October 30, 2025.

They released their debut-EP "It's a Hell of an Age" on January 23, 2026, which topped the Irish Independent Albums Chart and was number 3 on the overall Irish Albums Charts. The record's name is taken from the opening line of the final track, "Murphy Can Never Go Home" a traditional ballad detailing the Irish migrant experience abroad written by Mick Curry, an Irish labourer working in Birmingham. In October 2026 they released "Ribbon Factory", the lead-single of their debut album "Gorta" due for release on 15 January 2027. On 20 November 2026 the second single, "Searrach" was released, on the same day Madra Salach performed at the Rolling Stone UK Awards where they were awarded the "Breakthrough Award".

== Slane 2027 ==
On 31st August 2026 it was confirmed that Madra Salach will be supporting Fontaines DC at the Slane Festival on 26th and 27th June 2027.

== Personnel ==
- Paul Banks (Vocals)
- Adam Cullen (Guitar)
- Jack Martin (Mandolin/Tin Whistle/Synth)
- Maxime Arnold (Harmonium)
- Dara Duffy (Drums)
- Jack Lawlor (Bass)

== Discography ==
=== EPs ===
- It's a Hell of an Age (23 January 2026)

=== Albums ===
- Gorta (15 January 2027)
