= Long Way Home (Jamie Miller album) =

Studio album by Jamie Miller
- Released: 18 October 2024
- Genre: Pop
- Length: 41:00
- Label: BMG
- Producer: Abe Parker; Adam Yaron; Alex Borel; CAL; Colin Foote; dwilly; Dylan Rouda; Jason Strong; Josh Murty; Louis Schoorl; Mighty Mike; The Nocturnes; OAK; Peter Fenn; Ryan Marrone

Jamie Miller chronology
The Things I Left Unsaid (2023)	Long Way Home (2024)

Long Way Home is the debut studio album by the Welsh singer-songwriter Jamie Miller. It was released on 18 October 2024, by BMG. The album falls within the pop genre, featuring a blend of emotional ballads and upbeat rhythms.

Critically, Long Way Home has been praised for its raw and honest songwriting, drawing from Miller's personal experiences and journal entries during a particularly dark period in his life. The album is considered a significant milestone in Miller's career, showcasing his growth as an artist and his ability to connect with listeners on a deeply emotional level.

Jamie Miller, who gained initial fame as a contestant on The Voice UK in 2017, has described Long Way Home as a project that allowed him to explore his identity and experiences after moving from a small town in Wales to Los Angeles. The album reflects his journey of self-discovery and the challenges he faced while pursuing his dreams.
