= Dyane Connor =

Irish journalist

- Born: June 1979 (age 45); Killeagh, County Cork, Ireland
- Education: University College Cork; Dublin City University
- Occupation: RTÉ News multi-media journalist
- Years active: 2001–present
- Notable credit(s): CKR FM; Newstalk; TV3 News; RTÉ News
- Spouse: Mark Hilliard

Dyane Connor (born June 1979) is an Irish journalist who currently works as a reporter with RTÉ News.

== Career ==
Connor began her broadcasting career with Cork Campus Radio during her studies at University College Cork. Her first position after graduating was as a reporter and newsreader with CKR FM. Dyane joined Newstalk in 2002, before moving to TV3 in 2004. Initially working as a news anchor and general reporter, she was the TV3 courts correspondent for three years. During her tenure with TV3, Connor also presented the 24 Hours to Kill crime series.

In 2013, Connor joined RTÉ News as a multi-media journalist on RTÉ television and radio.

== Personal life ==
Born in Killeagh, County Cork, Connor was educated at St. Aloysius' College in Carrigtwohill. She completed a Bachelor of Arts in University College Cork, before graduating with an MA in journalism from Dublin City University in 2001.

In September 2013, Connor married Mark Hilliard, journalist with The Irish Times. They have two children.
