= The Things I Left Unsaid =

EP by Jamie Miller
- Released: 4 October 2023
- Length: 17:26
- Label: BMG

Jamie Miller chronology
Broken Memories (2022)	The Things I Left Unsaid (2023)	Long Way Home (2024)

Singles from The Things I Left Unsaid
- 1. "Maybe Next Time" Released: 10 May 2023; 2. "No Matter What" Released: 9 August 2023; 3. "Empty Room" Released: 15 September 2023

The Things I Left Unsaid is the second extended play (EP) by the Welsh singer-songwriter Jamie Miller. It was released on 4 October 2023, by BMG. It's the singer's first EP since he signed with BMG after leaving Atlantic Records on 4 May 2023, and was preceded by three singles, "Maybe Next Time", "No Matter What" and "Empty Room".

Miller started working on it in February 2023; he described the album as an introduction to his real self, exploring emotions, pain, and the lessons acquired over the last year. In particular, "Empty Room" tells about the loss of his grandmother, while "Only Place" is a pop-rock tune about breaking free from a narcissistic lover.

== Track listing ==
No.	Title	Writer(s)	Length
1.	"Intro"		1:53
2.	"No Matter What"	Jamie Miller; Alex Borel; Colin Foote; Jackson Foote	3:02
3.	"Empty Room"	Borel; C. Foote; Miller; Ricky Manning; Riley Biederer	3:04
4.	"Rooting for You"	Borel; C. Foote; Miller; Manning; Biederer	2:54
5.	"Maybe Next Time"	Miller; Caleb Shapiro; Adam Yaron	3:08
6.	"Only Place"	Miller; Borel; C. Foote; J. Foote	3:25
Total length:			17:26
