= Favourite (song) =

2024 single by Fontaines D.C.

Single by Fontaines D.C.

from the album Romance
- Released: 18 June 2024
- Genre: Jangle pop
- Length: 4:16
- Label: XL
- Composers: Carlos O'Connell; Conor Curley; Conor Deegan III; Grian Chatten; Tom Coll
- Producer: James Ford

Fontaines D.C. singles chronology
| "Starburster" (2024) | "Favourite" (2024) | "Here's the Thing" (2024) |

Music video
- "Favourite" on YouTube

"Favourite" is a song by the Irish rock band Fontaines D.C. It was released on 18 June 2024 as the second single from the band's fourth studio album Romance.

== Background ==
The closing song on Romance, frontman Grian Chatten described the song as having "this never-ending sound to it, a continuous cycle from euphoria to sadness, two worlds spinning forever." Chatten said the song was inspired by "There She Goes" by The La's and "Another Girl, Another Planet" by The Only Ones.

It was placed at the end of the album because it served a "cyclical" nature of both ending the album and beginning it anew, with Chatten comparing it to how James Joyce's Finnegans Wake both begins and ends with the same sentence.

"Favourite" was debuted live on 8 May 2024 at a surprise show in New York City's Warsaw club, marking the first show of the Romance era in a sold-out crowd of 1,000 people that included Alex Turner of Arctic Monkeys. The band also performed the song during their June set at Glastonbury Festival 2024.

== Composition ==
The track originated from a chord progression that guitarist Carlos O'Connell played to Chatten in 2022 while the band was recording their previous album, Skinty Fia. Chatten originally wrote 12 verses for the song. Guitarist Conor Curley said, "I think Grian was on a spark once he had the 'Favourite' motif that he had so many different angles to write so many verses. It'd be cool to do the long version live sometime."

The song was frequently described as jangle pop and compared to The Smiths. Curley said about the comparisons, "Shredding is obviously such an amazing thing to be able to do on a guitar, but when you can really write a feeling with a melody, like Johnny Marr did so well – that’s the goal."

== Commercial performance ==
The song peaked at No. 65 on the UK singles chart.

== Reception ==
Former United States president Barack Obama listed "Favourite" as one of his favorite songs of 2024.

=== Year-end lists ===
| Publication | Accolade | Rank | Ref. |
|---|---|---|---|
| Crack | The Top 25 Tracks of 2024 | 4 | |
| Exclaim! | 20 Best Songs of 2024 | 11 | |
| The Guardian | The 20 Best Songs of 2024 | 6 | |
| NPR | 124 Best Songs of 2024 | —N/a | |
| Paste | The 100 Best Songs of 2024 | 13 | |

== Music video ==
The video for the song was filmed in Madrid, where the band's guitarist Carlos O'Connell was born and raised. Bassist Conor Deegan said about the video, "This video is a reminiscing of the past; of each other’s childhoods we didn’t know. To see people we know on an intimate level as adults in the tender ages of childhood, we explore where we came from, and who on some level, still are." The video was directed by the band and also features footage of all five band members as children from their families' home videos.

== Cover version ==
On February 14, 2025, American electronic producer, DJ and singer Porter Robinson performed a cover version of "Favorite" live at Like a Version with a live band.

== Charts ==
=== Weekly charts ===
Weekly chart performance for "Favourite"
| Chart (2024–2026) | Peak position |
|---|---|
| Canada Modern Rock (Billboard Canada) | 23 |
| Canada Rock (Billboard) | 33 |
| Ireland (IRMA) | 13 |
| Japan Hot Overseas (Billboard Japan) | 17 |
| UK Singles (Official Charts) | 65 |
| UK Indie (Official Charts) | 14 |
| US Adult Alternative Airplay (Billboard) | 3 |
| US Rock & Alternative Airplay (Billboard) | 27 |

=== Year-end charts ===
Year-end chart performance for "Favourite"
| Chart (2025) | Position |
|---|---|
| Canada Modern Rock (Billboard) | 56 |

== Certifications ==
Certifications for "Favourite"
| Region | Certification | Certified units/sales |
|---|---|---|
| United Kingdom (BPI) | Gold | 400,000^{‡} |
^{‡} Sales+streaming figures based on certification alone.
