= Halcyon (Kingfishr album) =

Studio album by Kingfishr
- Released: 22 August 2025
- Genre: Indie folk
- Length: 53:48
- Labels: B-Unique; Atlantic
- Producers: David Anthony Curley; Patrick O'Donnell

Kingfishr chronology
Live from Dublin (2024)	Halcyon (2025)

Singles from Halcyon
- 1. "Flowers-Fire" Released: 29 April 2022; 2. "Eyes Don't Lie" Released: 9 September 2022; 3. "Caroline" Released: 8 September 2023; 4. "I Cried, I Wept" Released: 20 September 2024; 5. "Man on the Moon" Released: 7 February 2025; 6. "Killeagh" Released: 28 March 2025; 7. "Gloria" Released: 11 April 2025; 8. "Diamonds & Roses" Released: 23 May 2025; 9. "Next to Me" Released: 11 July 2025

Singles from Halcyon (Deluxe Edition)
- 1. "Hold Me Down" Released: 21 November 2025

Halcyon is the debut studio album by Irish folk group Kingfishr. It was announced in May 2025, alongside the release of single "Diamonds & Roses" and released on 22 August 2025 through B-Unique Records and Atlantic Records.

Upon announcement, the group said, "Halcyon is the culmination of three years' work, though most of the time it hasn't felt like it. We grew up in different parts of rural Ireland though the band itself was born on a dairy farm in Tipperary. The songs were written in a small kitchen where generations of farmers became singers and storytellers when the work was done. The name Halcyon is a nod to the landscape and heritage that has moulded our music, even though the songs don't all come from a happy or peaceful place. We're so proud of all of this. Thank you for being a part of it."

The album debuted at number one on the Irish Albums Chart.

A deluxe edition of the album was released on 21 November 2025 featuring four additional songs.

In May 2026, it placed 3rd for Irish Album of the Year and 1st for Debut Album of the Year in the Hot Press Readers' Poll.

== Critical reception ==
Professional ratings
Review scores
Source	Rating
Clash	8/10
Hot Press	8/10

Chris Connor from Clash gave it 8/10 saying, "This is a constantly impressive debut LP from one of the most exciting Irish acts in recent years. Their infectious blend of folk, indie and Irish traditional sounds. It’'s an immersive, engrossing 16 tracks that really cement Kingfishr's rising reputation."

Riccardo Dwyer from Hot Press gave it 8/10 saying "On Halcyon, Kingfishr affirm their ambitions with a big-sounding, radio-ready album that moves them beyond simple folk classification." and added "At 16 tracks, Halcyon does run long, risking momentum. Still, this debut signals major intent for a zeitgeist-defining band rapidly becoming one of Ireland's biggest."

Jo Forrst from Total Ntertainment said: "Kingfishr's rise has been built on the strongest of foundations: rousing hooks channelling fervent emotions that inspire huge singalongs at live shows, supported by the familiarity of their traditional Irish roots and the accessibility of their broader folk-pop / indie-pop soundscape. Those traits tower throughout Halcyon."

Matthew Caslin from When the Horn Blows called it a "stunning debut album" saying, "Kingfishr have achieved an incredible debut album. The body of work has it all. It shows off the group's love for their traditional roots and folk music as a genre. It also shows off how they have so much to add to the scene. Kingfishr are certainly ones to watch going forward."

== Track listing ==
All tracks are written by Eoin Fitzgibbon, Edmond Keogh, Eoghan McGrath (Kingfishr) with additional writers noted.

Halcyon track listing
No.	Title	Writer(s)	Length
1.	"Man on the Moon"	Jim Eliot	3:45
2.	"21"		2:59
3.	"Gloria"		3:38
4.	"I Cried, I Wept"		3:35
5.	"Next to Me"	Eliot	3:50
6.	"Diamonds & Roses"	Eliot; Billy Joel	2:45
7.	"Flowers-Fire"		3:16
8.	"Caroline" (rework)		3:50
9.	"Killeagh"		2:32
10.	"Ways to Change" (digital and CD only)		2:59
11.	"Shadow" (digital and CD only)	Carey Willetts	2:49
12.	"Blue Skies"		3:21
13.	"Shot in the Dark"		3:03
14.	"Eyes Don't Lie"		3:46
15.	"Someday"	Eliot	3:42
16.	"Schooldays"	Zak Lloyd; Amy Wadge	3:51
Total length:			53:48

Deluxe edition bonus tracks
No.	Title	Length
17.	"Hold Me Down"	2:34
18.	"All the Time Between Us"	2:28
19.	"Oh Love"	3:26
20.	"The Rose"	2:51

== Charts ==
Weekly chart performance for Halcyon
Chart (2025–2026)	Peak position
Australian Albums (ARIA)	64
Belgian Albums (Ultratop Flanders)	112
Dutch Albums (Album Top 100)	13
Irish Albums (Official Charts)	1
Scottish Albums (Official Charts)	3
Swiss Albums (Schweizer Hitparade)	80
UK Albums (Official Charts)	7

== Certifications ==
Certifications for Halcyon
Region	Certification	Certified units/sales
United Kingdom (BPI)	Silver	60,000^{‡}
^{‡} Sales+streaming figures based on certification alone.

== See also ==
- List of number-one albums of 2025 (Ireland)
