= Sara Kays =

American singer-songwriter (born 1999)

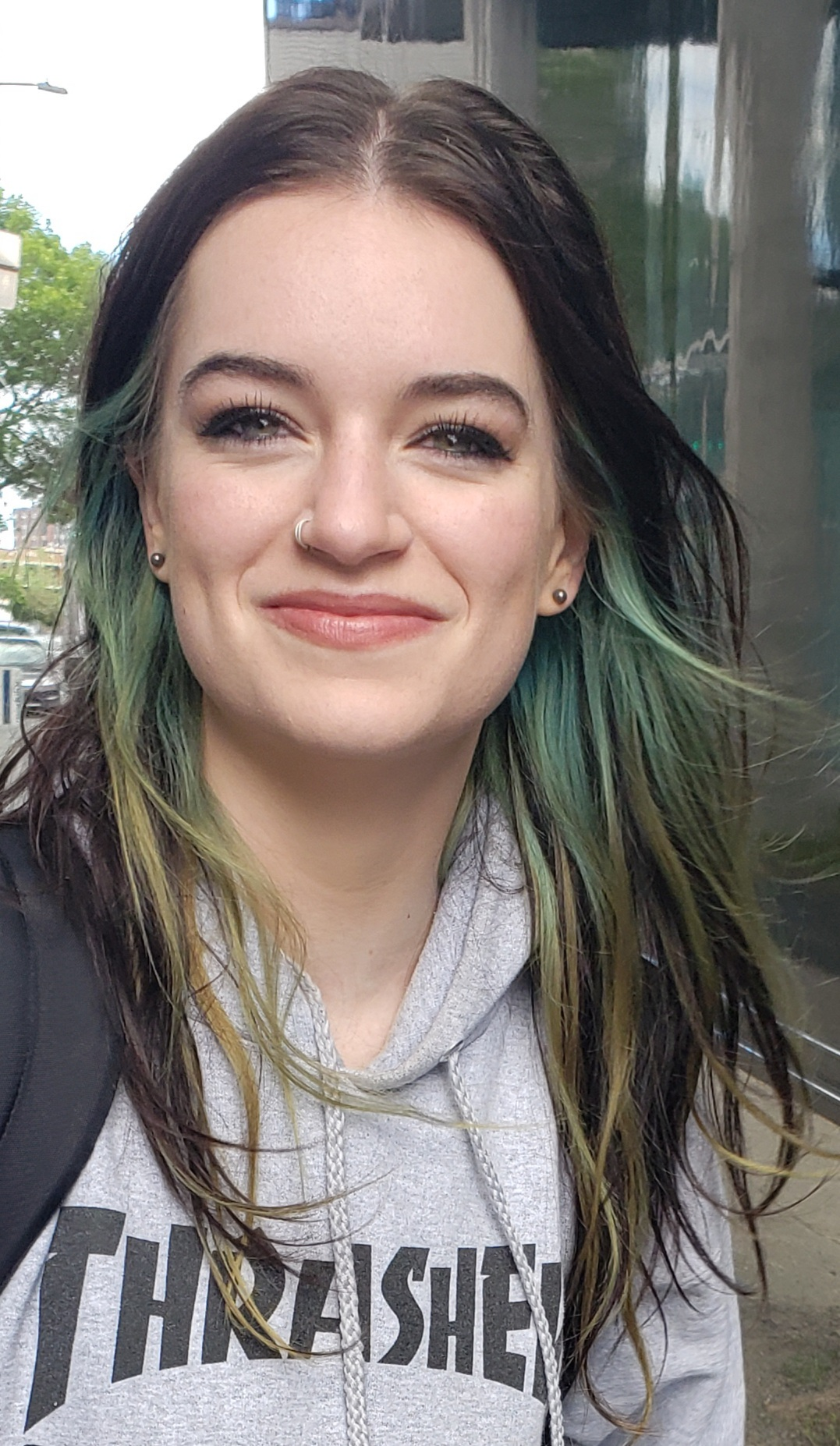
- Sara Kays photographed in 2022 in Montréal
- Born: February 18, 1999 (age 27); Indiana, US
- Occupation: Singer-songwriter
- Years active: 2018–present
- Musical career
- Genres: Alternative pop; pop
- Labels: Atlantic; Version III

Sara Kays (born February 18, 1999) is an American singer-songwriter.

== Early life ==
Kays grew up in Carmel, Indiana. After busking in her hometown as a teen, she began posting covers online. Kays began writing and posting original songs after moving to Nashville, Tennessee for college.

== Career ==
She released her first EP A House Too Big in 2018.

In 2020 she released Remember That Night? which a Billboard review said "demonstrates the full-bodied nature of her songwriting, which tells the story of post-breakup wistfulness while the vocals are layered during the most piercing stray thoughts." In 2021 she made her network TV debut performing it on The Late Show with Stephen Colbert.

She described Bored, released in 2023, as being "about how I struggle to open up to people because of the fear that people will get bored of me" in an interview with Rolling Stone.

== Musical influences ==
Kays cited Ed Sheeran, Mayday Parade, Jake Bugg, and Shawn Mendes as influences.

== Discography ==
=== EPs ===
- 2018: A House Too Big
- 2020: Camera Shy
- 2021 Struck By Lightning
- 2025 Reasons to Call You

=== Singles ===
- 2019: Under Covers
- 2019: Down Low
- 2019: Is There Anything Else?
- 2019: Rich Boy
- 2020: I'm Okay Though
- 2020: Same House
- 2020: No Matter the Season
- 2020: Smaller Than This
- 2020: Home for the Summer
- 2020: Chosen Last
- 2021: Remember That Night?
- 2021: Traffic Lights
- 2021: Future Kids
- 2021: Backseat Rider
