= The Sun Will Never Settle =

2026 single by Kingfishr

Single by Kingfishr
- Released: 26 May 2026
- Length: 2:28
- Label: B-Unique; Atlantic
- Songwriters: Eoin Fitzgibbons; Edmond Keogh; Eogan McGrath
- Producer: David Anthony Curley

Kingfishr singles chronology
| "The Blade" (2026) | "The Sun Will Never Settle" (2026) |

"The Sun Will Never Settle" is a song by Irish folk group Kingfishr. It was released on 26 May 2026 and debuted at number 57 on the Irish Singles Chart based on three days' sales. The following week, it rose to number 1, becoming the groups second Irish number-one single following "Killeagh" in 2025.

Upon release, Keogh said, "The song is about the end of a relationship and being better off for the experience. Sometimes these things don't work out. That's not ideal, but it also doesn't mean it wasn't worth it either."

== Reception ==
Frontview Magazine called it a "distinctly Irish folk song, backed by banjo, warm, swelling acoustic guitars and fronted by Eddie Keogh's rasping, rich vocal. You can already hear and picture those heaving crowds hollering it back to him in unison in a field this Summer."

Tom Skinner from NME called it a "distinctly Irish folk number".

== Charts ==
Weekly chart performance for "The Sun Will Never Settle"
| Chart (2026) | Peak position |
|---|---|
| Ireland (IRMA) | 1 |
| Sweden Heatseeker (Sverigetopplistan) | 6 |
| UK Singles (Official Charts) | 19 |

== See also ==
- List of number-one singles of 2026 (Ireland)
