= Marianne (Fontaines D.C. song) =

2026 single by Fontaines D.C.

Single by Fontaines D.C.

from the album Dopamine Chamber
- Released: 18 August 2026
- Length: 3:45
- Label: XL
- Composers: Carlos O'Connell; Conor Curley; Conor Deegan III; Grian Chatten; Tom Coll
- Producer: James Ford

Fontaines D.C. singles chronology
"In the Modern World" (2024)	"Marianne" (2026)	"Tongue" (2026)

Music video
- "Marianne" on YouTube

"Marianne" is a song by the Irish rock band Fontaines D.C. It was released on 18 August 2026 as the lead single from the band's fifth studio album Dopamine Chamber.

== Composition and lyrics ==
The main theme behind the single is escapism, which also serves as the central concept to Dopamine Chamber. Conor Deegan III, the bassist of Fontaines D.C., described the band's albums as having a sequence of relationships with place. Specifically, their debut album, Dogrel being connected to their hometown of Dublin, while subsequent albums such as A Hero's Death, Skinty Fia, and Romance have an ever-changing idea with the idea of place. Deegan as well as lead singer, Grian Chatten, noted that on both the single "Marianne" and the album itself, it asks the question about where is one to escape to when the act of escaping becomes more difficult.

== Music video ==
The music video for the song was also released on 18 August 2026. The music video was directed by Dave Meyers.

Lauren Hunter with Far Out Magazine described the music video as "cinematic" and "hallucinogenic".

The music video generated controversy for the possible use of generative AI within its music video. In the initial video credits, it had noted AI effects had been used, but it was subsequently revised to say that visual effects were revised to be undertaken by companies such as Foreign Xchange, DeepVFX, and PineappleVFX as post-production special effects. According to Paste, Deep VFX and Pineapple VFX have used generative AI in past work.

In an interview with the Los Angeles Times, Fontaines D.C. lead singer Grian Chatten said he was unaware that the video's visual effects team used generative AI until the morning the video was released, and the rest of the band, their label, and their management also did not know about its use. Chatten said he did not condone the use, and that the band would write into their contract that AI could not be used in their videos going forward.

== Critical reception ==
Professional ratings
Review scores
Source	Rating
Clash	8/10
NME	5/5 stars

The single was praised upon release by contemporary music critics. Andrew Trendell of NME gave the single a perfect five-star rating, stating that "Marianne" follows the rabbit deeper down the hole in search of more mechanical extremes and orchestral noir flourishes to explore the true, numbing oblivion of the modern world. 'Marianne' is the red pill you take to come along and see the truth of it all: "Understand this is your life, you can go on dreaming..."

== Charts ==
=== Weekly charts ===
Weekly chart performance
Chart (2026)	Peak position
Belgium (Ultratop 50 Flanders)	46
Canada Modern Rock (Billboard Canada)	6
Canada Rock (Billboard)	17
Colombia Anglo Airplay (Monitor Latino)	16
Estonia Airplay (TopHit)	64
Greece International (IFPI)	29
Ireland (IRMA)	2
Lithuania (AGATA)	75
Netherlands (Single Tip)	22
Netherlands Airplay (Dutch Charts)	50
New Zealand Hot Singles (RMNZ)	16
Portugal (AFP)	56
UK Singles (Official Charts)	12
UK Independent (Official Charts)	1
US Hot Rock & Alternative Songs (Billboard)	41
US Rock & Alternative Airplay (Billboard)	8

=== Monthly charts ===
Monthly chart performance
Chart (2026)	Peak position
Estonia Airplay (TopHit)	72
