= Starburster =

Single by Fontaines D.C.

from the album Romance
- Released: 17 April 2024
- Genre: Rap rock; post-punk; art rock; trip hop
- Length: 3:41
- Label: XL
- Composers: Carlos O'Connell; Conor Curley; Conor Deegan III; Grian Chatten; Tom Coll
- Producer: James Ford

Fontaines D.C. singles chronology
"Roman Holiday" (2022)	"Starburster" (2024)	"Favourite" (2024)

Music video
- "Starbuster" on YouTube

"Starburster" is a song by Irish rock band Fontaines D.C. It was released on the 17 April 2024 as the lead single from the band's fourth studio album, Romance.

The song was the band's first entry on the UK Singles Chart, peaking at No. 57. It received critical acclaim and placed on several publications' year-end lists. It was listed as a top 10 song of the year by Business Insider, Consequence, The Guardian, The Independent and NME. Spin proclaimed it the Song of the Year. At the 67th Grammy Awards, the song received a nomination for Best Alternative Music Performance.

"Starburster" is featured as part of the official soundtrack for EA Sports FC 25 and was used in the premiere trailer and end credits for Borderlands 4 as well as the Netflix series Outer Banks, Black Rabbit, and House of Guinness. The song is also the main theme for the Paramount+ TV series MobLand.

== Background ==
The song was written about a panic attack that frontman Grian Chatten suffered at London's St Pancras station. Grian admitted that he wrote the song "as a joke", and when showing the track to the rest of the band, "they laughed. But I was serious."

NME described "Starburster" as a "pensive art-rock beast that fuses elements of electronica and hip-hop". Consequence labelled it "trip-hop-infused" with "hip-hop-esque production" that frames Fontaines D.C. "as much more than just a gang of Irish rockers." Rolling Stone believed it to be a "funky, disco-rock track". Clash wrote of its construction: "An elegant string loop precedes tasteful piano before being consumed by a bulky trip-hop beat." Spin said the song was "fused with a driving drumbeat keeping 4/4 time and layered with electric guitar, trickling piano, and a hauntingly romantic synth sound".

The band debuted the song live on 7 May 2024 during their performance on The Tonight Show Starring Jimmy Fallon.

In March 2025, the band performed a special live version for Australian radio station Triple J's "Like a Version" segment, alongside a mash-up cover of "Can You Feel My Heart" by Bring Me the Horizon and "Heart-Shaped Box" by Nirvana.

== Reception ==
NME gave "Starburster" a five-star review, praising how it "captures that shock of trying to grasp reality amidst all the chaos." The Irish Times rated it four stars out of five, comparing it to Shygirl, The Prodigy and Björk's song "Army of Me". Consequence bestowed the "Song of the Week" honour to the track for its "remarkably well-constructed composition, one that pushes the band into new, unexpected places."

Naming it the "Song of the Year", Spin wrote that "Like Blur evoked for England, Fontaines D.C. reflects the turbulence of everyday life in Ireland." In October 2026, Rolling Stone placed the song at 61 on their list for "The 200 Best Rock Songs of the 21st Century".

=== Year-end lists ===
Publication	Accolade	Rank	Ref.
Billboard	Staff List: The 100 Best Songs of 2024	61	
Business Insider	The Best Songs of 2024	8	
Consequence	200 Best Songs of 2024	2	
The Guardian	The 20 Best Songs of 2024	6	
The Independent	20 Best Songs of 2024	9	
NME	The 50 Best Songs of 2024	3	
Pitchfork	The 100 Best Songs of 2024	19	
Rolling Stone	The 100 Best Songs of 2024	57	
Stereogum	The 50 Best Songs of 2024	36	

== Music video ==
The official music video was released with the song, directed by Aube Perrie. It features Grian Chatten performing mundane daily activities while wounded. He accidentally kicks his football into an unattended garage of a grocery shop, which he proceeds to explore, and discovers that a door in the building takes him to various film studios. Donning masks, makeup, and costumes from the studios, Chatten uses the garage to appear in various music video shoots. At the end of the video, security closes and locks the door of the garage.

Little Mix member Jade Thirlwall made an uncredited cameo in the video as a red-haired woman in an angel-themed video shoot that Chatten visits. On 19 July 2024, three months after the release of "Starburster", Thirlwall released her debut solo single, "Angel of My Dreams", the video of which was also directed by Perrie at the same time as "Starburster". As such, the video for "Angel of My Dreams" features the same scene, with Chatten making a cameo as one of the angel dancers.

== Commercial performance ==
"Starburster" debuted at No. 62 on the UK Singles Chart, the band's first entry. It peaked at No. 57.

== Charts ==
=== Weekly charts ===
Weekly chart performance for "Starburster"
Chart (2024–2026)	Peak position
Australia Digital Tracks (ARIA)	31
Canada Rock (Billboard)	12
Ireland (IRMA)	11
Japan Hot Overseas (Billboard)	11
Russia Streaming (TopHit)	98
UK Singles (Official Charts)	57
UK Independent (Official Charts)	4
US Rock & Alternative Airplay (Billboard)	22

=== Year-end charts ===
Year-end chart performance for "Starburster"
Chart (2025)	Position
Canada Modern Rock (Billboard)	67

=== Decade-end charts ===
20s Decade-end chart performance
Chart (2025–2026)	Position
Russia Streaming (TopHit)	196

== Certifications ==
Certifications for "Starbuster"
Region	Certification	Certified units/sales
New Zealand (RMNZ)	Gold	15,000^{‡}
United Kingdom (BPI)	Platinum	600,000^{‡}
^{‡} Sales+streaming figures based on certification alone.
