= Live from Dublin (Kingfishr album) =

Live album by Kingfishr
- Released: 19 July 2024
- Recorded: 21 and 22 March 2024
- Studio: Olympia Theatre, Dublin
- Genre: Indie folk
- Length: 44:52
- Labels: B-Unique; Doonane

Kingfishr chronology
Shadow (2024)	Live from Dublin (2024)	Halcyon (2025)

Live from Dublin is a live album by Irish folk group Kingfishr. It was recorded on 21 and 22 March 2024 and released on 19 July 2024 through B-Unique Records and Doonane Records.

Upon release, the band said in a statement, "The Olympia Theatre was the venue we targeted from day one, it's iconic in Ireland and for any Irish artist it's the dream... Those gigs were so important to us and we needed something to remember them, something we could look at and be proud of how far we had come. The idea to record them for a live album came from that sentiment, it's a landmark moment in this journey we're on and we're really excited to be able to share that with everyone."

The album debuted at number 5 on the Irish Albums Chart.

== Critical reception ==
Stuart Daley from The Pentatonic said "The recording captures the band at a pivotal moment on their rapid growth and allows listeners to share in the triumph" adding the "album brilliantly captures the raw and emotive energy."

== Track listing ==
Live from Dublin track listing
No.	Title	Length
1.	"Heart in the Water"	4:49
2.	"Headlands"	4:45
3.	"Shadow"	3:10
4.	"Leave"	3:28
5.	"Afterglow"	3:22
6.	"Shot in the Dark"	3:04
7.	"Vancouver"	3:29
8.	"Eyes Don't Lie"	4:04
9.	"Anyway"	5:15
10.	"Flowers-Fire"	3:19
11.	"Caroline"	6:06
Total length:		44:52

== Charts ==
Weekly chart performance for Live from Dublin
Chart (2024)	Peak position
Irish Albums (Official Charts)	5
Scottish Albums (Official Charts)	47
UK Independent Albums (Official Charts)	11
UK Vinyl Albums (Official Charts)	22
