= Killeagh (song) =

2025 single by Kingfishr

Single by Kingfishr

from the album Halcyon
- Released: 28 March 2025
- Length: 2:30
- Label: B-Unique; Atlantic
- Songwriters: Eoin Fitzgibbons; Edmond Keogh; Eoghan McGrath
- Producer: David Anthony Curley

Kingfishr singles chronology
"Man on the Moon" (2025)	"Killeagh" (2025)	"Gloria" (2025)

"Killeagh" is a song by Irish folk group Kingfishr. It was originally released as the B-side of "Bet On Beauty", released in December 2024.

The song was officially serviced to Irish radio on 28 March 2025. The single first reached number 1 on the Irish Singles Chart in May 2025 where it stayed for two weeks; it returned to number 1 for a second time in July 2025 for another 8 weeks, and returned to number 1 for a third time in December 2025 for another 7 weeks. These 17 non-consecutive weeks at the top of the chart make it the second-longest running Number One in the history of the Irish singles chart.. As of June 2026, "Killeagh" had almost reached five-times platinum status in Ireland.

The official acoustic video was released on April 2025.

In December 2025, it was announced as the most streamed song in Ireland in 2025.

It has been described as an Irish "cultural phenomenon" by The Irish News.

== Background ==
In mid-2024, Eoin Fitzgibbon was asked by former hurling coach Phillip O'Neill to write a song for Killeagh GAA to which he agreed if the juniors made the east Cork final that year. Fitzgibbon believed it was unlikely as team hadn't made the final since 2001. Fitzgibbon said, "lo and behold, October arrives and they get to the final" and he is contacted by O'Neill.

The song was written in 20 minutes, with the group saying "It literally could not have been more of a slapped-together job" referencing the sport of hurling, the focal point it provides for local people and County Cork broadly. The group also joked in a video recording from October 2024, "Welcome to the best thing we've ever written".

The first live performance of the song was by the Killeagh junior hurlers, who went on to win their final. The song was recorded by the group in November 2024 and released in December 2024 as a B-side on their single "Bet on Beauty".

In February 2025, the song gained traction on TikTok, where it became anthem of nostalgia, this continued through St Patricks Day. It was sent to Irish radio in March 2025. The song peaked at number one on the Irish Singles Chart on 2 May 2025.

== Reception ==
Dr Sandra Joyce and Dr Róisín Ní Ghallóglaigh from University of Limerick note the song employs phrasings typical of Irish traditional music, with a verse's second line ending on a minor note before resolving itself on a major one. Ní Ghallóglaigh described it as "a great song" and that it is "a modern addition to the Irish folk canon. 100%".

In an album review, Matthew Caslin from When the Horn Blows said "'Killeagh' feels like a real marker of remembering where we all come from, appreciating our homes and our backgrounds."

== Charts ==
Weekly chart performance for "Killeagh"
Chart (2025–2026)	Peak position
Ireland (IRMA)	1
UK Singles (Official Charts)	60

== Certifications ==
Region	Certification	Certified units/sales
United Kingdom (BPI)	Silver	200,000^{‡}
^{‡} Sales+streaming figures based on certification alone.

== See also ==
- List of number-one singles of 2025 (Ireland)
