= Iloveitiloveitiloveit =

2026 single by Bella Kay

Single by Bella Kay

from the EP A Couple Minutes Out and the album My Reckless Abandon
- Released: January 11, 2026
- Genre: Indie pop
- Length: 3:03
- Label: Atlantic
- Songwriters: Bella Kay; Alexis Kesselman
- Producer: Idarose

Bella Kay singles chronology
"Lonely" (2025)	"Iloveitiloveitiloveit" (2026)	"Promise?" (2026)

"Iloveitiloveitiloveit" is a song by American singer-songwriter Bella Kay, released on January 11, 2026, as the lead single from her second EP A Couple Minutes Out (2026), and the lead single from her debut studio album, My Reckless Abandon (2026). It gained traction on the video-sharing app TikTok and became a breakout hit. The song reached number one in Ireland and Norway.

The track was re-released via Atlantic Records after she signed to the label.

== Composition ==
"Iloveitiloveitiloveit" is a pop song driven by guitar. In the lyrics, Bella Kay focuses on her internal conflict and turmoil from her desire to continue a relationship that she understands may be self-destructive.

== Release and promotion ==
Bella Kay began teasing the song on December 3, 2025 with a TikTok post highlighting the beginning of the chorus. She shared several snippets of the song throughout the month, helping it generate widespread attention ahead of its release on January 11, 2026. By February 2026, it had featured in more than 100,000 videos on TikTok, where users paired the chorus with posts about their relationships.

== Commercial performance ==
According to Luminate, the song earned 1.46 million official on-demand US streams in the week of January 16–22, 2026. It rose to 3.75 million streams by the week of February 6–12, representing a 156% increase over three weeks.

== Charts ==
Chart performance for "Iloveitiloveitiloveit"
Chart (2026)	Peak position
Australia (ARIA)	3
Austria (Ö3 Austria Top 40)	27
Belgium (Ultratop 50 Flanders)	27
Canada Hot 100 (Billboard)	9
Canada CHR/Top 40 (Billboard)	35
Croatia International Airplay (Top lista)	95
Czech Republic Singles Digital (ČNS IFPI)	92
Denmark (Tracklisten)	6
Finland Airplay (Radiosoittolista)	40
Germany (GfK)	45
Global 200 (Billboard)	13
Greece International (IFPI)	92
Iceland (Billboard)	4
Ireland (IRMA)	1
Latvia Airplay (LaIPA)	5
Lebanon (Lebanese Top 20)	2
Malta Airplay (Radiomonitor)	15
Netherlands (Dutch Top 40)	8
Netherlands (Single Top 100)	2
New Zealand (Recorded Music NZ)	3
Nigeria (TurnTable Top 100)	91
Nigeria Airplay (TurnTable)	46
Norway (VG-lista)	1
Portugal (AFP)	138
Sweden (Sverigetopplistan)	4
Switzerland (Schweizer Hitparade)	35
UK Singles (Official Charts)	2
US Billboard Hot 100	17
US Adult Pop Airplay (Billboard)	40
US Hot Rock & Alternative Songs (Billboard)	2
US Pop Airplay (Billboard)	20

== Certifications ==
Certifications for "Iloveitiloveitiloveit"
Region	Certification	Certified units/sales
Australia (ARIA)	2× Platinum	140,000^{‡}
Canada (Music Canada)	Platinum	80,000^{‡}
Denmark (IFPI Danmark)	Gold	45,000^{‡}
Netherlands (NVPI)	Gold	46,500^{‡}
New Zealand (RMNZ)	2× Platinum	60,000^{‡}
United Kingdom (BPI)	Platinum	600,000^{‡}
United States (RIAA)	Platinum	1,000,000^{‡}
^{‡} Sales+streaming figures based on certification alone.

== Release history ==
Release dates and formats for "Iloveitiloveitiloveit"
Region	Date	Format	Label(s)	Ref.
United States	March 10, 2026	Contemporary hit radio	Atlantic	
