= Jamie Miller (singer) =

Welsh singer-songwriter (born 1997)

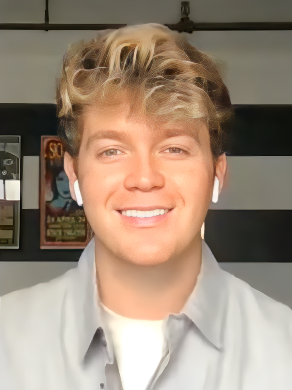
- Miller in 2022

Background information
- Born: 9 September 1997 (age 29); Cardiff, Wales
- Genres: Pop; R&B; soul
- Occupation: Singer-songwriter
- Instruments: Vocals; piano
- Years active: 2017–present
- Labels: Atlantic; BMG; Republic
- Website: jamiemillermusic.com

Jamie Miller (born 9 September 1997) is a Welsh singer-songwriter from Cardiff, currently based in Los Angeles. He first gained recognition as a finalist on The Voice UK in 2017, where he finished in third place. Known for his blend of pop and R&B influences, Miller signed with Atlantic Records in 2020 and released his debut EP, Broken Memories, in April 2022. In 2023, he signed with BMG and released his debut album, Long Way Home (2024).

He has collaborated with artists including Tori Kelly, Young K, and Moira Dela Torre. Miller has released two EPs, Broken Memories (2022) and The Things I Left Unsaid (2023), along with several singles. His international breakthrough came in 2026, when his song "Babydoll" and its dance video became popular on TikTok, eventually reaching number one on the UK singles chart.

== Early and personal life ==
Miller was born in Cardiff to Scottish parents, and grew up in Pontprennau in the north of the city. He has two sisters. He attended St Bernadette's Primary School and his year 6 teacher was Mrs Suzanne Williams and that is where he started singing, he then went to Corpus Christi Catholic High School. He left school at age 16 and briefly worked in a call centre. Miller came out as bisexual in March 2021.

== Career ==
=== 2017: The Voice UK ===
Miller initially auditioned to appear on the X Factor, but was unsuccessful. He then tried to pursue music again by applying and auditioning to be on the sixth series of The Voice UK. During the given series' blind auditions, he spun two chairs and chose Jennifer Hudson over Gavin Rossdale as his coach. He advanced through the competition and ultimately finished in third place.

Performances on The Voice UK
Episode	Song choice	Result
Blind Auditions	"Let It Go"	Turned two chairs; picked Jennifer Hudson
The Battles	"Perfect Strangers"	Through to the Knockouts
The Knockouts	"Shape of You"	Through to Quarter Finals
Quarter Finals	"Love on the Brain"	Through to Semi Finals
Semi Finals	"Stitches"	Through to Finals
The Finals	"What Do You Mean?"	Third place
The Finals	"Runnin' (Lose It All)" (Duet with Jennifer Hudson)	Third place

=== 2017–present ===
Miller released covers of songs, which prompted Atlantic Records to offer him a recording contract. Since then, he has played in various concerts, including at The Globe, alongside other venues before moving to Los Angeles. Under Atlantic, he wrote and released original songs ("The City That Never Sleeps", "Onto Something", "Hold You 'Til We're Old" and "Here's Your Perfect") and co-wrote Paloma Faith's song "Loyal". Jesse McCartney invited Miller to open up for him for his The New Stage tour around the United States. He also served as the opening act during the North American leg of Calum Scott's "Bridges" World Tour in the summer of 2022. On the tours, he debuted his EP, Broken Memories.

On 4 May 2023, Miller departed from Atlantic Records and announced his new label partnership with BMG along with a new management deal. He premiered his single, "Maybe Next Time", on 10 May. His second EP, The Things I Left Unsaid, was released on 4 October. Miller supported Eric Nam on his House On a Hill Tour. On 20 February 2024, Miller announced his first headline tour around different cities in Europe and US. On 18 October 2024, Miller released his debut album, Long Way Home, with BMG. In 2025, he went on tour with Canadian singer Alex Sampson. In August 2026, Miller's song "Babydoll", and its accompanying dance video went viral on TikTok, reaching number 1 on the UK singles chart.

== Discography ==
=== Studio albums ===
Title	Details
Long Way Home	Released: 18 October 2024; Label: BMG; Formats: Digital download, streaming

=== Extended plays ===
Title	Details
Broken Memories	Released: 29 April 2022; Label: Atlantic; Formats: Digital download, streaming
The Things I Left Unsaid	Released: 4 October 2023; Label: BMG; Formats: Digital download, streaming

=== Singles ===
Title	Year	Peak chart positions										Album
Title	Year	UK	AUS	BEL (FL)	CAN	IRE	NOR	NZ	SWE	US	WW	Album
"City That Never Sleeps"	2020	—	—	—	—	—	—	—	—	—	—	Non-album singles
"Onto Something"	2020	—	—	—	—	—	—	—	—	—	—	Non-album singles
"Hold You 'Til We're Old"	2021	—	—	—	—	—	—	—	—	—	—	Non-album singles
"Here's Your Perfect"	2021	—	—	—	—	—	—	—	—	—	—	Non-album singles
"Running Out of Roses" (with Alan Walker)	2021	—	—	—	—	—	15	—	78	—	—	Walker Racing League
"I Lost Myself in Loving You"	2022	—	—	—	—	—	—	—	—	—	—	Broken Memories
"Last Call"	2022	—	—	—	—	—	—	—	—	—	—	Broken Memories
"It Is What It Is"	2022	—	—	—	—	—	—	—	—	—		Broken Memories
"Maybe Next Time"	2023	—	—	—	—	—	—	—	—	—	—	The Things I Left Unsaid
"No Matter What"	2023	—	—	—	—	—	—	—	—	—	—	The Things I Left Unsaid
"Empty Room"	2023	—	—	—	—	—	—	—	—	—	—	The Things I Left Unsaid
"In the Cards"	2024	—	—	—	—	—	—	—	—	—	—	Long Way Home
"Nothing to Miss"	2024	—	—	—	—	—	—	—	—	—	—	Long Way Home
"Long Way Home"	2024	—	—	—	—	—	—	—	—	—	—	Long Way Home
"Babydoll"	2026	1	1	4	18	1	9	1	3	37	6	TBA
"It's Beginning to Look a Lot Like Christmas"	2026	—	—	—	—	—	—	—	—	—	—	
"—" denotes recording did not chart in that territory.

=== Soundtrack appearances ===
Title	Year	Album
"Wishes"	2022	Snowdrop OST Part 4

== Tours ==
=== Headlining ===
- Long Way Home World Tour (2024)

=== Supporting act ===
- The New Stage Tour (2022)
- Bridges World Tour by Calum Scott (2022)
- House on a Hill World Tour by Eric Nam (2023–2024)

== Awards ==
- Young and Promising International Artist - SCTV Music Awards (2022)
