= Where Is Gone? =

Single by Fontaines D.C. and Rosalía

from the album Dopamine Chamber
- Released: 12 October 2026
- Length: 5:16
- Label: 32 County Love Train; XL
- Songwriters: Carlos O'Connell; Conor Curley; Conor Deegan III; Grian Chatten; Tom Coll
- Producer: James Ford

Fontaines D.C. singles chronology
"Tongue" (2026)	"Where Is Gone?" (2026)	"Japan" (2026)

Rosalía singles chronology
"Focu 'Ranni" (2026)	"Where Is Gone?" (2026)

"Where Is Gone?" is a song by Irish rock band Fontaines D.C. and Spanish singer Rosalía. It was released as a single on 12 October 2026, ahead of the album Dopamine Chamber. It was the third single from the album and peaked at number 6 on the Irish Singles Chart.

"Where Is Gone?" is Fontaines D.C.'s first collaboration with another artist. Guitarist Carlos O'Connell, who was raised in Spain, praised Rosalía as an artist that he considered to be preserving Spanish music as Fontaines D.C. had with Irish music.

== Critical reception ==
Victoria Borlando of The Needle Drop and Tom Breihan of Stereogum considered the orchestral elements to be similar to Rosalía's album Lux. A review in the NME compared it to the works of Ennio Morricone and the "James Bond Theme".

== Charts ==
Chart performance for "Where Is Gone?"
Chart (2026)	Peak position
Belgium (Ultratop 50 Flanders)	47
Greece International (IFPI)	11
Ireland (IRMA)	6
Lithuania (AGATA)	71
Netherlands (Single Tip)	8
Portugal (AFP)	26
Spain (Promusicae)	66
UK Singles (Official Charts)	57
UK Indie (Official Charts)	6
