= Babydoll (Jamie Miller song) =

Single by Jamie Miller
- Released: 7 August 2026
- Genre: Pop
- Length: 2:59
- Label: Republic
- Songwriters: Jamie Miller; Hayley Warner; Michael Blum
- Producers: Hayley Warner; Michael Blum

Jamie Miller singles chronology
"Long Way Home" (2026)	"Babydoll" (2026)

Music video
- "Babydoll" on YouTube

"Babydoll" (also written "Baby Doll") is a song by the British singer and songwriter Jamie Miller, released on 7 August 2026 as the lead single from Miller's upcoming second studio album.

"Babydoll" peaked at the top of the UK Singles Chart, becoming the first UK number one single by a Welsh solo male artist since Chico's "It's Chico Time" in March 2006, and by any Welsh artist since Kosheen singer Sian Evans's collaboration with DJ Fresh on "Louder" in July 2011. On 20 November 2026, "Babydoll" became the joint-longest UK number one single by a Welsh artist of the 21st century when it spent its fifth week at the top of the UK Singles Chart, after Duffy's "Mercy" achieved the feat in March 2008. "Babydoll" became the second UK number-one song from a The Voice UK alumna after "Gecko (Overdrive)" by Becky Hill with Oliver Heldens in June 2014. Outside the United Kingdom, "Babydoll" topped the charts in Australia, Ireland, the Netherlands and New Zealand.

== Background ==
Miller had taken some time away from music before writing "Babydoll". A dance trend gained it popularity on TikTok. Miller also released a version with Antonio Cipriano.

== Live performances ==
Both Miller and Cipriano performed the song on Strictly Come Dancing on 25 October. On 14 November, Miller performed the song at the 2026 Kids' Choice Awards, with Cipriano and Victoria Justice dancing alongside him on stage and Miller getting slimed at the end of the song.

== Chart performance ==
The song reached number one in the UK in October 2026.

== Charts ==
Chart performance
Chart (2026)	Peak position
Australia (ARIA)	1
Australia Airplay (RCS)	15
Australia Airplay (RCS) version featuring Antonio Cipriano	19
Austria (Ö3 Austria Top 40)	14
Austria Airplay (IFPI)	36
Belgium (Ultratop 50 Flanders)	1
Belgium (Ultratop 50 Wallonia)	1
Canada Hot 100 (Billboard)	18
CIS Airplay (TopHit)	99
Croatia International Airplay (Top lista)	4
Denmark (Tracklisten)	2
Denmark Airplay (Tracklisten)	8
Estonia Airplay (TopHit)	30
France (SNEP)	75
France Airplay (SNEP) version featuring Antonio Cipriano	60
Germany (GfK)	25
Germany Airplay (MusicTrace)	27
Global 200 (Billboard)	6
Ireland (IRMA)	1
Italy Airplay (EarOne)	19
Japan Hot Overseas (Billboard Japan)	16
Latvia Airplay (LaIPA)	15
Lithuania Airplay (TopHit)	13
Luxembourg (Billboard)	14
Malta Airplay (Radiomonitor)	3
Netherlands (Dutch Top 40)	1
Netherlands (Single Top 100)	1
Netherlands Airplay (Dutch Charts)	1
New Zealand (Recorded Music NZ)	1
New Zealand Airplay (RCS)	2
North Macedonia Airplay (Radiomonitor)	1
Norway (IFPI Norge)	9
Norway Airplay (IFPI)	18
Poland Airplay (OLiS)	21
Portugal (AFP)	64
San Marino Airplay (SMRTV Top 50)	35
South Africa Airplay (TOSAC)	6
Sweden (Sverigetopplistan)	3
Switzerland (Schweizer Hitparade)	12
Switzerland Airplay (MusicTrace)	37
UK Singles (Official Charts)	1
US Billboard Hot 100	37
US Adult Pop Airplay (Billboard)	30
US Pop Airplay (Billboard)	31

== Certifications ==
Region	Certification	Certified units/sales
United Kingdom (BPI)	Silver	200,000^{‡}
^{‡} Sales+streaming figures based on certification alone.

== Release history ==
Release dates and formats for "Babydoll"
Region	Date	Format	Label(s)	Ref.
United States	20 October 2026	Contemporary hit radio	Republic	
Italy	30 October 2026	Radio airplay	Island	
