= Amble (band) =

Irish folk band

- Genre: Irish folk
- Years active: 2022–present
- Label: Warner Records
- Members: Robbie Cunningham; Oisín McCaffrey; Ross McNerney
- Website: ambleofficial.com

Amble is an Irish folk band formed in 2022. The band's members are Robbie Cunningham, Oisín McCaffrey, and Ross McNerney.

== History ==
The band was originally formed by Cunningham and McCaffrey as a duo in 2022. Their main aim was to play cover songs in pubs in order to obtain free pints. McNerney was added to the band due to his skills playing the mandolin and banjo.

After playing a concert in Leitrim, McNerney suggested that the band become a serious endeavor. At the time, McCaffrey was working as a data scientist and programmer at Pfizer, Cunningham was a primary school teacher in Terenure, and McNerney was a secondary school teacher in Longford.

By 2024, all three members had quit their jobs after signing a recording contract with Warner Records. When Cunningham told his father that he would quit his job, his father responded with the phrase, "throw the trout out to catch the salmon". The phrase, which the band has described as "resonating", has appeared on official merchandise.

In 2025, Amble joined Hozier's Unreal Unearth tour, appearing as an opening act in Boston, Casper, Wyoming, Billings, Montana, and Toronto.

In 2026, Amble joined Ed Sheeran's Loop Tour, as a featured supporting act on the North American leg of the tour including stops such as Glendale, Arizona and Nashville, Tennessee.

== Discography ==
Amble discography
- Studio albums: 1
- EPs: 4
- Live albums: 1
- Singles: 8

=== Studio albums ===
List of studio albums, with selected chart positions
Title	Album details	Peak chart positions	
Title	Album details	IRE	UK
Reverie	Released: 23 May 2025; Label: Warner; Format: Digital download, streaming	1	48
Love and All Its Wares	Release date: 29 January 2027	To be released	

=== Live albums ===
List of live albums
Title	Album details
Live from Dublin	Released: 4 July 2025; Label: Warner; Format: Digital download, streaming
Live from Dublin II	Released: 26 February 2026; Label: Warner; Format: Digital download, streaming

=== EPs ===
List of EPs, with selected chart positions
Title	EP details	Peak chart positions	
Title	EP details	IRE	UK Sales
Live EP	Released: 10 March 2023; Label: Warner; Format: Digital download, streaming	—	—
Of Land and Sea	Released: 16 February 2024; Label: Warner; Format: Digital download, streaming	—	—
The Commons	Released: 1 November 2024; Label: Warner; Format: Digital download, streaming	30	—
Hand Me Downs	Released: 26 September 2025; Label: Warner; Format: Digital download, streaming	—	94

=== Singles ===
Title	Year	Peak chart positions	Album/EP
Title	Year	IRE	Album/EP
"Mariner Boy"	2023	—	Reverie
"Mary's Pub"	2023	48	Reverie
"Full Circle"	2024	—	Non-album single
"Lonely Island"	2024	8	Reverie
"Little White Chapel"	2024	47	Reverie
"The Commons"	2024	—	The Commons
"Sam Hall" (traditional)	2024	—	Non-album single
"Schoolyard Days"	2025	9	Reverie
"Swan Song"	2025	19	Reverie
"Marlay Park"	2025	32	Reverie
"Treehouse Wings"	2025	26	Reverie
"Of Land and Sea"	2025	23	The Commons
"Hand Me Downs"	2025	20	Hand Me Downs
"Socrates Smiled"	2025	12	Hand Me Downs
"The Rarest Hour"	2025	43	Non-album singles
"Moral Victory"	2026	17	Non-album singles
"The Swell"	2026	1	Love and All Its Wares
"Last Rites"	2026	44	Love and All Its Wares
"Church Bells"	2026	37	Love and All Its Wares
"The Snake with the Eyes of Garnet"	2026	69	20th Century Paddy – The Songs of Shane MacGowan

=== Other charted songs ===
Title	Year	Peak chart positions	Album/EP
Title	Year	IRE	Album/EP
"Tonnta"	2023	12	Of Land and Sea
"Jersey Giant"	2026	31	Live from Dublin
