= Bella Kay =

American singer-songwriter

- Kay performing in 2026
- Born: Bella Kathleen Ann Williams; March 23, 2006 (age 20); Houston, Texas, U.S.
- Occupation: Singer-songwriter
- Years active: 2025–present
- Musical career
- Origin: Austin, Texas, U.S. Orlando, Florida, U.S.
- Genre: Indie pop
- Instruments: Vocals; guitar
- Label: Atlantic
- Website: www.bellakaymusic.com

Bella Kathleen Ann Williams (born March 23, 2006), better known as Bella Kay, is an American indie pop singer-songwriter based in Orlando, Florida. She gained popularity in 2025 with her debut single "The Sick" that peaked at number 33 on the UK singles chart. Her 2026 single "Iloveitiloveitiloveit" became her first entry on the US Billboard Hot 100, peaking at number 17. It also charted in the UK at number 2. In November 2025, she released her debut EP Sick to My Stomach. Later on, in July 2026, Kay released her debut album My Reckless Abandon.

== Early life ==
Kay was born on March 23, 2006 in Houston, Texas and graduated from Vista Ridge High School in Cedar Park, Texas in 2024 and later moved to Orlando, Florida.

Kay started writing songs as a teenager and first gained attention by sharing her music and social media snippets ahead of releasing an official single. Kay’s sound blends intimate bedroom pop with confessional lyrics as she explores themes of self‑discovery and relationships.

== Career ==
On August 4 2025, she released her debut single "The Sick". The song charted at 33 in the UK and surpassed 100 million streams on Spotify. She then released her single "Lonely", and in November 2025, released her debut EP Sick to My Stomach.

In January 2026, she released the song "Iloveitiloveitiloveit", which peaked at number 2 in the UK. In April 2026, Kay told Rolling Stone magazine that she was finishing up her debut album and in May she was announced to be supporting Noah Kahan on his The Great Divide Tour. The same month, she was also announced to be performing as an opening act for Gracie Abrams' The Look at My Life Tour.

== Artistry ==
Kay has cited Rihanna, Olivia Rodrigo, Lizzy McAlpine and Sabrina Carpenter as her musical influences. Her musical style has been described as indie pop.

== Discography ==
=== Albums ===
List of albums, with selected details and chart positions
Title	Details	Peak chart positions					
Title	Details	US	AUS	BEL (FL)	NLD	NOR	NZ
My Reckless Abandon	Released: July 12, 2026; Label: Atlantic; Formats: CD, digital download, streaming	96	12	51	93	18	19

=== Extended plays ===
- Sick to My Stomach (2025)
- A Couple Minutes Out (2026)
- Are You Mad at Me? (2026)

=== Singles ===
List of singles, with selected chart positions, showing year released and album name
Title	Year	Peak chart positions									Certifications	Album
Title	Year	US	AUS	CAN	IRE	NLD	NOR	NZ	UK	WW	Certifications	Album
"The Sick"	2025	— (Note: "The Sick" did not enter the Billboard Hot 100, but peaked at number 12 on the Bubbling Under Hot 100 chart.)	64	78	26	— (Note: "The Sick" did not enter the Dutch Single Top 100, but peaked at number 14 on the Dutch Single Tip chart.)	72	— (Note: "The Sick" did not enter the NZ Top 40 Singles Chart, but peaked at number 3 on the NZ Hot Singles Chart.)	33	—	BPI: Silver; RMNZ: Gold	Sick to My Stomach
"Lonely"	2025	—	—	—	—	—	—	—	—	—		Sick to My Stomach
"Iloveitiloveitiloveit"	2026	17	3	9	1	2	1	3	2	13	RIAA: Platinum; ARIA: 2× Platinum; BPI: Platinum; MC: Platinum; NVPI: Gold; RMNZ: 2× Platinum	A Couple Minutes Out & My Reckless Abandon
"Promise?"	2026	— (Note: "Promise" did not enter the Billboard Hot 100, but peaked at number 18 on the Bubbling Under Hot 100 chart.)	—	—	66	—	—	— (Note: "Promise?" did not enter the NZ Top 40 Singles Chart, but peaked at number 15 on the NZ Hot 40 Singles Chart.)	87	—		Are You Mad at Me? & My Reckless Abandon
"Stop"	2026	—	—	—	—	—	—	— (Note: "Stop" did not enter the NZ Top 40 Singles Chart, but peaked at number 17 on the NZ Hot 40 Singles Chart.)	—	—		Are You Mad at Me? & My Reckless Abandon
"—" denotes recording did not chart in that territory.

=== Other charted songs ===
List of other charted songs, with selected chart positions, showing year released and album name
Title	Year	Peak chart positions								Album
Title	Year	US Bub.	US Rock	AUS	CAN	IRE	NOR	NZ Hot	UK	Album
"Steady"	2026	9	17	77	78	51	86	11	49	A Couple Minutes Out
"Wonder Wander"	2026	—	33	—	—	—	—	—	—	A Couple Minutes Out
"Say It Say"	2026	—	—	—	—	—	—	34	—	Are You Mad at Me?
"Blur"	2026	—	—	—	—	—	—	30	—	My Reckless Abandon
"Tongue"	2026	—	—	—	—	—	—	18	—	My Reckless Abandon
"I Deserve Better"	2026	—	50	—	—	—	—	26	—	My Reckless Abandon
"See It Coming"	2026	—	—	—	—	—	—	27	—	The Hunger Games: Sunrise on the Reaping (The Album)
"—" denotes recording did not chart in that territory.

== Tours ==
=== Headlining ===
- A Couple Minutes Tour (2026)
- The Reckless Tour (2026)

=== Opening act ===
- Maisie Peters' Before the Bloom Tour (2026)
- Ricky Montgomery's Montgomery Ricky 10 Year Anniversary Tour (2026)
- Noah Kahan's The Great Divide Tour (2026)
- Gracie Abrams's The Look at My Life Tour (2027)
