= Romance (Fontaines D.C. album) =

2024 studio album by Fontaines D.C.

Studio album by Fontaines D.C.
- Released: 23 August 2024
- Recorded: November 2023
- Studios: La Frette (France); The Church (London)
- Genre: Alternative rock
- Length: 36:57
- Label: XL
- Producer: James Ford

Fontaines D.C. chronology
Skinty Fia (2022)	Romance (2024)	Dopamine Chamber (2026)

Singles from Romance
- 1. "Starburster" Released: 17 April 2024; 2. "Favourite" Released: 18 June 2024; 3. "Here's the Thing" Released: 6 August 2024; 4. "In the Modern World" Released: 20 August 2024; 5. "Bug" Released: 4 November 2024

Singles from Deluxe Edition
- 1. "It's Amazing to Be Young" Released: 21 February 2025; 2. "Before You I Just Forget" Released: 16 April 2025

Romance is the fourth studio album by the Irish rock band Fontaines D.C., released on 23 August 2024. It features the singles "Starburster", "Favourite", "Here's the Thing", "In the Modern World" and "Bug". It is their first release on XL Recordings, after the band left Partisan Records, and was produced by James Ford.

The album received acclaim from critics. In the United Kingdom, it sold more than double the first-week total of its number-one predecessor Skinty Fia. It debuted at number two on the UK Albums Chart behind Sabrina Carpenter's Short n' Sweet. Romance received two nominations at the 67th Annual Grammy Awards: Best Rock Album and Best Alternative Music Performance (for "Starburster").

== Background ==
Grian Chatten told Mojo that they decided to step away from their Irish-centric themes for the album as it would have been too difficult to "sound like Ireland" while crafting a futuristic and dystopian vision called Romance. According to Chatten, the songwriting process was, as usual for the band, a "constant process" that happened between touring. The "spiritual form" of the album first emerged when he wrote the track "In the Modern World". He compared the process to soundtracking a city for which he finally understood the "colour and the year and the atmosphere and the temperature" of. The album was influenced by several locations as well as "certain atmospheres at certain times", including Tokyo. Chatten stated, "We write a lot more based on visual references than musical references. It's easier to be original." The album was also inspired by Japanese manga and Italian cinema. The album is produced by James Ford. Drummer Tom Coll said that Romance was, in some ways, like the band's first-ever studio record in that they deliberately moved away from their long-held "if we can't play it live, let's not do it" mentality.

"Horseness Is the Whatness", was written by guitarist Carlos O'Connell, and the title was taken from Ulysses. The lyrics to "Here's the Thing" were built off the back of an argument between Chatten and O'Connell, and "In the Modern World" was inspired by Lana Del Rey's "strain of disillusionment". "Favourite" originally had twelve verses written by Chatten, however, it was shortened to just four by the rest of the band. And, to Conor Curley, his lead vocals on "Sundowner" were by accident.

== Influences ==
Frontman Grian Chatten noted the influence of Dylan Thomas and the book Land Sickness by Nikolaj Schultz as well as the films Sunset Boulevard, The Great Beauty and Wings of Desire on his lyricism.

In 2023, the band supported Arctic Monkeys on their North American tour and watched Blur play Wembley Stadium. Chatten said, "I didn't want to write, like, a "Champagne Supernova", but I did want to do something that felt like it was deep within and far without." Guitarist Conor Curley found himself listening to much of Massive Attack and Portishead, as well as "Freedom Fighter" by Bowery Electric – feeling inspired by music that's already considered "classic". Drummer Tom Coll got "set off on a hip-hop vibe" – partially due to playing drums on the Kneecap album Fine Art – and immersed himself in grunge, going on to say he "probably left the house [Recording Studio] only three times in three weeks".

The lead single "Starburster" saw guitarist Carlos O'Connell inspired by Deftones and Alice in Chains. It contains rapping, which Chatten said was influenced by Korn in a "tongue-in-cheek" manner, a band that "scared the shit out of me as a kid".

"In the Modern World" is inspired by Akira's "depiction of apocalyptic emotion", with Chatten mentioning "..I can hear the buildings collapsing." Conor Deegan mentioned beat poets in reference to the song's feel, saying: "That song, I get visions of On the Road, Jack Kerouac, driving through the desert in America, the beat-up 1950s car, right? And they stop into the motel for some warm cans of beer. The AC isn't working. The fan is spinning half-speed. All that shit."

The horror-inspired music video for single "Here's the Thing" drew comparisons to the films The Lost Boys (1987) and Phenomena (1985). It was directed by Luna Carmoon, who confirmed the influence of Phenomena, and commented:

I had, at the time, recently rewatched one of my favourite films: Dario Argento's Phenomena, which is the biggest influence on the music video. I just thought it'd be fantastic to see a world like this in the backdrop of the Irish dancing arena. You have a lot of films like Drop Dead Gorgeous about American Beauty pageants, but you don't really have that in Britain or Ireland, that kind of hyper-femininity meets violence. The Lost Boys was another big influence. I wanted it to be Lost Boys but Girls.

== Critical reception ==
Professional ratings
Aggregate scores
Source	Rating
AnyDecentMusic?	8.8/10
Metacritic	89/100
Review scores
Source	Rating
AllMusic	4/5 stars
The Guardian	5/5 stars
The Irish Times	4.5/5 stars
Mojo	4/5 stars
NME	5/5 stars
Pitchfork	7.7/10
Record Collector	4/5 stars
Rolling Stone	4/5 stars
The Skinny	5/5 stars
Uncut	8/10

Keith Cameron of Mojo rated it 4 out of 5 stars, stating, "Inspired by Japanese manga and Italian cinema, the Irish quintet's fourth searches for truth in a world gone wrong." Cameron continued: "The more conventionally arranged Bug still has him [Grian] threading words like a tessellated moving pavement [...]. With the music's adjacency to 'There Is a Light That Never Goes Out', it occurs that just like the Smiths, this is a rock band with both a fresh vocabulary and behavioural code."

Shaun Curran, while writing for Record Collector, gave the album 4 stars out of 5, concluding, "It's startling to think how far Fontaines D.C. have travelled creatively in five years, through an agitated, restlessness, a vivid imagination and courage to try the new." Curran also named "Favourite" as the best song on the album, describing it as a "sound-of-the-summer" track where shoegaze meets the Cure.

The Irish Times's Tony Clayton gave the album a 4.5 out of 5 stars, concluding the band's evolution through the album as, "It's all quite a remove from 'Boys in the Better Land', 'Liberty Belle', 'Too Real' and 'Big', but Fontaines DC rightly ask what the point is if you have to ask permission to evolve." The last track "Favourite" also was named as the best song with "irresistible jangly guitars and, perhaps, is a sign of what to expect on album number five".

Alexis Petridis, The Guardian's head rock and pop critic, named Romance as "album of the week" - giving the album 5 out of 5 stars - and surmised the impact as: "Romance is more straightforwardly approachable than any Fontaines DC album to date – you can easily imagine 'Desire' provoking an immense crowd into singing along. But it doesn't sacrifice any of the band's potency in the process: thrillingly, it still carries the same grimy, careworn, aggressive qualities as their previous work."

Uncut's Daniel Dylan rated it an 8/10, describing the album and the band's sonic evolution as, "From the electronic slow-build moody ruminations of Romance via the panic-attack-inspired "Starburster" or the swooping harmonies of "In the Modern World", it feels as though the band have carved out a new sonic space for them to operate in while still retaining their own identity."

NME gave the album five stars, calling it "an album that charts the devastating duality of its title." They called Romance the band's "most considered and intricately crafted release yet".

On 28 November 2024, Romance won the Album Award at the Rolling Stone UK Awards 2024, and was called by the magazine "an instant classic".

=== Year-end lists ===
Select year-end rankings for Romance
Publication/critic	Accolade	Rank	Ref.
BBC Radio 6 Music	26 Albums of the Year 2024	—N/a	
Exclaim!	50 Best Albums of 2024	39	
DIY	The 20 Best Albums of 2024	3	
The Guardian	The 50 Best Albums of 2024	7	
The Independent	The best albums of 2024, ranked	1	
MOJO	75 Best Albums of 2024	7	
NME	The 50 Best Albums of 2024	2	
Rough Trade UK	Albums of the Year 2024	13	
The Sunday Times	The 25 Best Albums of 2024	1	
The Telegraph	The 10 Best Albums of 2024	5	
Time Out	The Best Albums of 2024	1	
Uncut	80 Best Albums of 2024	13	

== Accolades ==
On 10 September 2025, Romance was announced as one of 12 nominees for the 2025 Mercury Prize.

== Track listing ==
All lyrics are written by Grian Chatten, except "Horseness Is the Whatness" (lyrics by Carlos O'Connell), "Sundowner" (lyrics by Chatten and Conor Curley), and "Starburster / In Heaven (Lady in the Radiator Song)" (lyrics by Chatten and David Lynch); all music is composed by Fontaines D.C.

Romance track listing
No.	Title	Length
1.	"Romance"	2:33
2.	"Starburster"	3:41
3.	"Here's the Thing"	2:43
4.	"Desire"	3:39
5.	"In the Modern World"	4:26
6.	"Bug"	3:02
7.	"Motorcycle Boy"	3:42
8.	"Sundowner"	3:25
9.	"Horseness Is the Whatness"	3:07
10.	"Death Kink"	2:23
11.	"Favourite"	4:16
Total length:		36:57

Deluxe edition bonus tracks
No.	Title	Length
12.	"It's Amazing to Be Young"	3:30
13.	"Before You I Just Forget"	3:56
14.	"Starburster / In Heaven (Lady in the Radiator Song)"	4:26
Total length:		48:49

== Personnel ==
Credits are adapted from the album's liner notes and Tidal.

=== Fontaines D.C. ===
- Grian Chatten – vocals, piano (all tracks); Mellotron (track 2), guitar (5, 7, 10, 11), acoustic guitar (12)
- Conor Curley – guitar (1–13), Bass VI (1, 2), vocals (8), backing vocals (1, 4, 6)
- Carlos O'Connell – guitar, keyboards (1–13); Mellotron (1, 2, 5, 8, 9), backing vocals (4, 7, 11), Yamaha Reface CP (1, 2, 4, 5, 8–10), Minimoog (1), organ (5), ring modulation (6), piano (7), synthesizer (14), design, art direction
- Conor Deegan – bass, Bass VI (1–13); backing vocals (1–8, 10, 11), tick tack piano (1), Minimoog (4), piano (12)
- Tom Coll – drums, percussion (1–13); guitar (9)

=== Additional credits ===
- James Ford – production, mixing, Therevox, Moog (all tracks); fuzz guitar (1), Suiko Koto synthesizer (4), programming (12, 13)
- Freddy Wordsworth – keyboards arrangement
- Emma Smith – violin (2, 4, 5, 9, 13)
- Jennymay Logan – violin (2, 4, 5, 9, 13)
- Richard Jones – viola (2, 4, 5, 9, 13)
- Laura Moody – cello (2, 4, 5, 9, 13)
- Marriane Schofield – double bass (2, 4, 5, 9, 13)
- Anthony Cazade – engineering (1–6, 8–13)
- Luke Pritchard – engineering (7)
- Mason Stuart – engineering (14)
- Matt McMenamin – engineering (14)
- Samuel Borst – engineering assistance (1–6, 8–13)
- Chihara Ferracuti – engineering assistance (7)
- Animesh Raval – strings engineering (2, 4, 5, 9)
- Matt Colton – mastering
- Lulu Lin – cover images
- Theo Cottle – photography
- Texas Maragh – design, art direction

== Charts ==
=== Weekly charts ===
Weekly chart performance for Romance
Chart (2024–2025)	Peak position
Australian Albums (ARIA)	6
Austrian Albums (Ö3 Austria)	7
Belgian Albums (Ultratop Flanders)	2
Belgian Albums (Ultratop Wallonia)	2
Croatian International Albums (HDU)	1
Danish Albums (Hitlisten)	23
Dutch Albums (Album Top 100)	2
Finnish Albums (Suomen virallinen lista)	32
French Albums (SNEP)	3
German Albums (Offizielle Top 100)	6
Irish Albums (Official Charts)	2
Italian Albums (FIMI)	8
Japanese Top Albums Sales (Billboard Japan)	99
Lithuanian Albums (AGATA)	48
New Zealand Albums (RMNZ)	6
Polish Albums (ZPAV)	16
Portuguese Albums (AFP)	4
Scottish Albums (Official Charts)	2
Spanish Albums (Promusicae)	9
Swedish Physical Albums (Sverigetopplistan)	3
Swiss Albums (Schweizer Hitparade)	3
UK Albums (Official Charts)	2
UK Independent Albums (Official Charts)	1
US Billboard 200	97
US Independent Albums (Billboard)	16
US Top Rock & Alternative Albums (Billboard)	20

=== Year-end charts ===
2024 year-end chart performance for Romance
Chart (2024)	Position
Belgian Albums (Ultratop Flanders)	48
Croatian International Albums (HDU)	26
Portuguese Albums (AFP)	142
UK Albums (OCC)	61

2025 year-end chart performance for Romance
Chart (2025)	Position
Belgian Albums (Ultratop Flanders)	56
Croatian International Albums (HDU)	9
UK Albums (OCC)	41

== Certifications ==
Certifications for Romance
Region	Certification	Certified units/sales
United Kingdom (BPI)	Platinum	300,000^{‡}
^{‡} Sales+streaming figures based on certification alone.
