= Dopamine Chamber =

2026 studio album by Fontaines D.C.

Studio album by Fontaines D.C.
- Released: 16 October 2026
- Recorded: February 2025 – March 2026
- Studios: Decoy (Suffolk); Baltic (Note: Strings recording); Narcissus (London) (Note: Pre-production engineering)
- Length: 43:59
- Labels: 32 County Love Train; XL
- Producer: James Ford

Fontaines D.C. chronology
Romance (2024)	Dopamine Chamber (2026)

Singles from Dopamine Chamber
- 1. "Marianne" Released: 18 August 2026; 2. "Tongue" Released: 30 September 2026; 3. "Where Is Gone?" Released: 12 October 2026; 4. "Japan" Released: 16 October 2026

Dopamine Chamber is the fifth studio album by the Irish rock band Fontaines D.C. It was released through 32 County Love Train and XL Recordings on 16 October 2026.

Production for Dopamine Chamber was handled by James Ford, who worked with the band on their previous album, Romance (2024). Dopamine Chamber contains a guest appearance from Rosalía and is characterised by its alternative rock aesthetic. It was supported by the singles "Marianne", "Tongue" and "Where Is Gone?" (with Rosalía). The album charted at number one in Australia, Flanders, Ireland, the Netherlands, Portugal, Switzerland, and the United Kingdom, becoming the band's second number-one album on the Irish Albums Chart and the UK Albums Chart.

== Composition ==
Fontaines D.C. began developing Dopamine Chamber during the 2025 North American leg of their world tour supporting the release of their fourth album Romance (2024). The band considered changing its sound on the album by incorporating other genres, such as folk music, before deciding to continue the alternative rock aesthetic of Romance.

The album's lyrics were largely written by Grian Chatten during a "very short, compressed writing trip" while travelling across Vienna and Venice. Its instrumentation was mostly recorded at Decoy Studios in Suffolk with producer James Ford, who had worked with the band on their previous album Romance (2024). Ford and Chatten then recorded Chatten's vocals separately at a makeshift home studio in Palermo, with the vocal booth created out of mattresses and cushions.

Chatten sought to include Spanish singer-songwriter Rosalía on the album, favourably comparing her to David Bowie and Björk, stating, "There's a classical nature [to Rosalía's voice], but there's also something eerily sort of dystopian". Chatten sent her the track "Where Is Gone?": Rosalía returned her contributions in forty-eight hours, recording her verse while on the Lux Tour in the United States.

== Promotion ==
In August 2026, Fontaines D.C. introduced a new logo, a newsletter, and a new press image on social media featuring the number 5, hinting at the album. During a performance in Cádiz on 9 August, the band performed two unreleased songs, "Marianne" and "Six Shot Morning", which were eventually released on the album. The album's title was publicly revealed six days later, with its announcement accompanied by a teaser of "Six Shot Morning".

On 17 August, an exclusive first pressing of Dopamine Chamber on vinyl was made available, revealing its October 2026 release date. The album's lead single, "Marianne", was released the following day. On 29 August, the band debuted the song "Happy for You" during their headlining performance at Leeds Festival. On 17 September, Dopamine Chamber's tracklist was revealed, and its second single, "Tongue", was released on 30 September. Four days prior to its release, the album's third single, "Where Is Gone?" (with Rosalía), was released.

== Critical reception ==
Professional ratings
Aggregate scores
Source	Rating
AnyDecentMusic?	8.2/10
Metacritic	84/100
Review scores
Source	Rating
AllMusic	4/5 stars
Exclaim!	8/10
The Guardian	5/5 stars
The Irish Times	4/5 stars
Mojo	4/5 stars
NME	5/5 stars
Pitchfork	7.8/10
Rolling Stone	4/5 stars
Uncut	3.5/5

According to the review aggregator Metacritic, Dopamine Chamber received "universal acclaim" based on a weighted average score of 84 out of 100 from 24 critic scores.

In a positive review for Exclaim!, Wesley McLean praised the band's shift into a darker sound and themes, stating that if 2024's Romance was their "explosive exploration of love and the pursuit of meaning in a society on the brink of doom, Dopamine Chamber is the fallout zone that they've found themselves in as a result".

Andrew Trendell for NME gave the album five stars and compared it to similarly dark work like Mezzanine by Massive Attack and Pornography by The Cure, describing Dopamine Chamber as "an extraordinary record for extraordinary times", and that the band had "made something pure, honest and feeling while in exhilarating motion"

In Shaad D'Souza's Pitchfork review, he stated that the album "balances profound cynicism and genuine beauty [in] its ice-hearted stadium rock".

In a glowing review from Waxx Lyrical's Ben Preece, he called the album "a strong new chapter in Fontaines D.C.’s journey" and predicted it enough to launch them further into the global mainstream.

== Track listing ==
All lyrics are written by Grian Chatten; all music is composed by Fontaines D.C.

Dopamine Chamber track listing
No.	Title	Length
1.	"Six Shot Morning"	4:56
2.	"Marianne"	3:45
3.	"Mimesis"	3:51
4.	"Happy for You"	3:48
5.	"Demolition"	3:19
6.	"Tongue"	3:13
7.	"One Man"	4:58
8.	"Where Is Gone?" (with Rosalía)	5:16
9.	"You Miss Me"	3:35
10.	"Japan"	3:15
11.	"Intimate"	3:57

Japanese edition bonus track
No.	Title	Length
12.	"Starburster" (Live from Finsbury Park)

== Personnel ==
Credits are adapted from the liner notes of the album's Japanese release.

=== Fontaines D.C. ===
- Grian Chatten – vocals (all tracks), guitar (tracks 5, 7, 8, 9, 10), tambourine (2, 7), string arrangements (2, 6–9), synthesizer (3), triangle (7)
- Conor Curley – guitar (all tracks), synthesizers (1, 2), sub-bass (3, 5, 11)
- Carlos O'Connell – guitar, synthesizers, additional programming (all tracks); effects (6, 7)
- Conor Deegan – bass, backing vocals (all tracks); synthesizers (1, 3, 9), Mellotron (5), piano (6), guitar (7)
- Tom Coll – drums, additional programming (all tracks); percussion (1–11), drum machine (1), synth bass (2)

=== Additional contributors ===
- James Ford – production, mixing, programming (all tracks); ARP 2600 (1–3, 5, 7, 11), Syncussion (1–3, 5, 7, 11), string melody (3, 6), modular synthesizer (3, 11); Yamaha DX100, Buchla synthesizer (4); Moog (5), additional piano (6), Therevox (8, 10); acoustic guitar, Fender VI guitar, electric cello (8); Roland RS-09 (9, 10), Chromaplane (11)
- Marta Salogni – engineering, additional programming (all tracks); tape machine manipulation (1, 2, 6, 7, 9, 11), Buchla synthesizer (7)
- Richard Jones – string arrangements, viola (2, 6–9)
- Laura Moody – string arrangements, cello (2, 6–9)
- Emma Smith – violin (2, 6–9)
- Jennymay Logan – violin (2, 6–9)
- Beth Symmons – double bass (2, 6–9)
- Elysian Collective – string arrangements (2, 6–9)
- Rosalía – vocals (8)
- Chilli Jesson – piano, Roland SP-404 (12)
- Robert Sellens – assistant engineering
- Madison Claridge – assistant engineering
- Drew Dungate-Smith – pre-production engineering
- Matt Colton – mastering
- Evie Clark–Yospa – strings engineering (2, 6–9)
- Eva Valentin – assistant strings engineering (2, 6–9)
- Scott Wright – creative direction
- Texas Maragh – art direction, design
- Elizaveta Porodina – photography

== Charts ==
=== Weekly charts ===
Weekly chart performance
Chart (2026)	Peak position
Australian Albums (ARIA)	1
Austrian Albums (Ö3 Austria)	2
Belgian Albums (Ultratop Flanders)	1
Belgian Albums (Ultratop Wallonia)	2
Canadian Albums (Billboard)	16
Croatian International Albums (HDU)	1
Danish Albums (Hitlisten)	4
Dutch Albums (Album Top 100)	1
Finnish Albums (Suomen virallinen lista)	8
French Albums (SNEP)	3
French Rock & Metal Albums (SNEP)	1
German Albums (Offizielle Top 100)	2
German Rock & Metal Albums (Offizielle Top 100)	1
Hungarian Albums (MAHASZ)	2
Irish Albums (Official Charts)	1
Irish Independent Albums (IRMA)	1
Italian Albums (FIMI)	2
Japanese Albums (Oricon)	51
Japanese Digital Albums (Oricon)	80
Japanese Download Albums (Billboard Japan)	56
Japanese Rock Albums (Oricon)	8
Japanese Top Albums Sales (Billboard Japan)	57
Lithuanian Albums (AGATA)	3
New Zealand Albums (RMNZ)	2
Norwegian Albums (IFPI Norge)	3
Polish Albums (ZPAV)	4
Portuguese Albums (AFP)	1
Scottish Albums (Official Charts)	1
Spanish Albums (Promusicae)	2
Swedish Albums (Sverigetopplistan)	2
Swiss Albums (Schweizer Hitparade)	1
UK Albums (Official Charts)	1
UK Independent Albums (Official Charts)	1
US Billboard 200	14
US Independent Albums (Billboard)	1
US Top Rock & Alternative Albums (Billboard)	5

=== Monthly charts ===
Monthly chart performance
Chart (2026)	Position
Croatian International Vinyl Albums (HDU)	1

== Certifications ==
Certifications for Dopamine Chamber
Region	Certification	Certified units/sales
United Kingdom (BPI)	Gold	100,000^{‡}
^{‡} Sales+streaming figures based on certification alone.
