= Kingfishr =

Musical group

- Origin: Limerick, Ireland
- Genres: Indie folk, Irish folk
- Years active: 2022–present
- Label: B-Unique Records
- Members: Eoin Fitzgibbon; Eddie Keogh; Eoghan McGrath
- Website: kingfishr.ie

Kingfishr are an Irish indie folk group comprising members Eddie Keogh (lead vocals, guitar, harmonica), Eoghan "McGoo" McGrath (banjo, mandolin, backing vocals), and Eoin "Fitz" Fitzgibbon (guitar, backing vocals). The band was formed in Limerick when the three founding members (who hail from Tipperary, Cork and Wexford) met while studying engineering at the University of Limerick (UL). They are still based in Limerick. The band's breakout success was their song "Killeagh", which reached number one on the Irish Singles Chart on 2 May 2025. Their debut studio album Halcyon was released in August 2025. The group's second studio album Weight of the Feather is scheduled for release in April 2027.

== Career ==
Eoin Fitzgibbon, Edmond Keogh and Eoghan McGrath met in college in 2017. Their debut single "Flowers-Fire" was released on 29 April 2022.

In March 2024, the group released their debut EP, Shadow.

In July 2024, they released Live from Dublin.

In May 2025, the group achieved their first number one on the Irish Singles Chart with "Killeagh".

Their debut studio album, Halcyon was released in August 2025 and debuted at number one on the Irish Albums Chart and reached no. 7 in the UK album chart.

The group achieved a second Irish number-one single in 2026 with "The Sun Will Never Settle".

== Discography ==
=== Studio albums ===
List of studio albums, showing relevant details and selected chart positions
Title	Details	Peak chart positions						Certifications
Title	Details	IRE	AUS	NLD	SCO	SWI	UK	Certifications
Halcyon	Released: 22 August 2025; Label: B-Unique; Format: Digital download, streaming, CD, vinyl	1	64	13	3	80	7	BPI: Silver
Weight of the Feather	Scheduled: 9 April 2027; Label: B-Unique, Atlantic; Format: Digital download, streaming, CD, vinyl	To be released						

=== Live albums ===
List of live albums, showing relevant details and selected chart positions
Title	Details	Peak chart positions	
Title	Details	IRE	SCO
Live from Dublin	Release: 19 July 2024; Label: B-Unique; Format: Digital download, streaming, CD	5	47

=== Extended plays ===
List of extended plays, showing relevant details
Title	Details
Live from Doonane (Acoustic)	Release: 24 November 2023; Label: B-Unique; Format: Digital download, streaming
Shadow	Release: 8 March 2024; Label: B-Unique; Format: Digital download, streaming

=== Singles ===
List of singles, with selected chart positions, showing year released and album name
Title	Year	Peak chart positions		Album
Title	Year	IRE	UK	Album
"Flowers-Fire"	2022	23	—	Halcyon
"Eyes Don't Lie"	2022	20	—	Halcyon
"Heart in the Water"	2023	—	—	Non-album singles
"Anyway"	2023	—	—	Non-album singles
"Headlands"	2023	—	—	Non-album singles
"Caroline"	2023	12	—	Halcyon
"Flowers-Fire" (re-recorded featuring Jamie Duffy)	2023	—	—	Non-album singles
"Vancouver"	2023	—	—	Non-album singles
"Shot in the Dark"	2023	46	—	Shadow
"Leave"	2024	—	—	Shadow
"Flowers-Fire (Rework)"	2024	—	—	Shadow
"Shadow"	2024	82	—	Shadow
"Afterglow"	2024	—	—	Non-album singles
"Go Loud"	2024	—	—	Non-album singles
"I Cried, I Wept"	2024	54	—	Halcyon
"The Saviour"	2024	85	—	Non-album singles
"Bet On Beauty"	2024	—	—	Non-album singles
"Man On the Moon"	2025	20	—	Halcyon
"Killeagh"	2025	1	60	Halcyon
"Gloria"	2025	73	—	Halcyon
"Diamonds & Roses"	2025	3	—	Halcyon
"Next to Me"	2025	12	—	Halcyon
"Hold Me Down"	2025	35	—	Halcyon (deluxe)
"The Blade" (solo or with Matt Corby)	2026	8	—	Non-album singles
"The Sun Will Never Settle"	2026	1	19	Non-album singles
"The Sunnyside of the Street" (with Shane MacGowan)	2026	—	—	20th Century Paddy – The Songs of Shane MacGowan
"For the Boys"	2026	37	—	Non-album singles
"How Lonely"	2026	26	—	Non-album singles
"Weight of the Feather"	2026	12	—	Weight of the Feather
"—" denotes release did not chart in that territory.
