= List of 2027 albums =

The following is a list of albums, EPs, and mixtapes released or scheduled for release in 2027. These albums are (1) original, i.e. excluding reissues, remasters, and compilations of previously released recordings, and (2) notable, defined as having received significant coverage from reliable sources independent of the subject.

For additional information about bands formed, reformed, disbanded, or on hiatus, for deaths of musicians, and for links to musical awards, see 2027 in music.

== First quarter ==
=== January ===
List of albums to be released in January 2027
Go to: February | March | April | May | Unscheduled and TBA | Back to top
Release date	Artist	Album	Genre	Label	Ref.
January 8	Carissa's Wierd	Somewhere Further Than Far Away		Nettwerk	
January 8	Diamante	Supernova		Sumerian	
January 8	Hot Chip	A Long Way from Kansas		Domino	
January 8	Orden Ogan	Lords of the Grave		Reigning Phoenix	
January 8	Shed Seven	Shed Seven		Cooking Vinyl	
January 8	U.D.O.	Voodoo Ranger		Reigning Phoenix	
January 15	Atmosphere	Good Bye Make Party		Rhymesayers Entertainment	
January 15	Brandy Clark	The Bird		Reprise	
January 15	Dirty Honey	Catch My Butterfly		Dirt Records	
January 15	Doireann Ní Ghlacáin	An Tairseach: The Threshold			
January 15	Floor Jansen	Hytress		ReVamp Music, Warner	
January 15	Friendly Fires	Dig Deeper		Lab	
January 15	Grave Digger	Faces of Pain		Reaper Entertainment	
January 15	James Marriott	Warning Signs		AWAL	
January 15	Kacey Musgraves	Middle of Nowhere Vol. 2: Tex Mex Tapes		Lost Highway	
January 15	Lambrini Girls	No Refunds		City Slang	
January 15	Madra Salach	Gorta		Island	
January 15	Mei Semones	Howl		Verve, Interscope	
January 15	Mia Joy	Star Echo Heavy Dove		Fire Talk	
January 15	Nimino	Keep Me Awake		Counter	
January 15	Resolve	Spread My Ashes into Space		Arising Empire	
January 15	Soul Glo	Na I'm Gon Grab Allat		Epitaph	
January 15	This Is the Kit	Ghost Coat		Rough Trade	
January 15	Valley	Do You Need to Be Entertained?		Universal Music Canada, Capitol	
January 15	Warhaus	The Donkey		PIAS	
January 22	The Academic	I'm Not Crying You Are			
January 22	Chvrches	All the King's Men		Futures Music Group	
January 22	Clutch	Wasted Lands		Weathermaker Music	
January 22	Dom Flemons	Making American Music: The Smithsonian Sessions		Smithsonian Folkways	
January 22	Elderbrook	Heart on a Wire			
January 22	Fionn Regan	Berlin, Berlin		Cormorant Bird Records	
January 22	The Flaming Lips	The Teardrop Throbs		Third Man	
January 22	Guided By Voices	Speculation and Gossip		Guided By Voices Inc	
January 22	Helena Deland	Eternity Shrugs		Chivi Chivi	
January 22	Isak Danielson	Love, Isak			
January 22	Kameron Marlowe	Kameron Marlowe		Sony Music Nashville	
January 22	Kate Nash	Cailín'			
January 22	Knifeplay	What Is Truth?		Double Double Whammy	
January 22	Lee Aaron	Re-Vamp		Metalville	
January 22	The Lemonheads	Townesville			
January 22	Little Grandad	Speak Softly, Son			
January 22	Modeselektor	MDSLKTR			
January 22	Palaye Royale	Amsterdamage		Sumerian	
January 22	Saxon	Gods of Thunder			
January 22	Smush	I'll Always Wish,,			
January 22	Teddy Swims	Ugly		Warner	
January 22	The The	The Ensouled Tour – Live at the Sydney Opera House		Cinéola, earMUSIC	
January 22	The Twang	Bring Yourself		Cooking Vinyl	
January 29	Amble	Love and All Its Wares		Warner	
January 29	Andy Burrows	Map of the World		Free Pass Records	
January 29	Avery Cochrane	Vengeance Through My Omnipresence			
January 29	Bicep	Slug		Ninja Tune	
January 29	Bill MacKay and Michael Zerang	Scarlet Hour		Drag City	
January 29	Blue Bendy	One Day This Will All Be Lore			
January 29	Charlotte Cardin	Midnight, Mon Amour			
January 29	Claire Rousay and Zander Raymond	Something Good			
January 29	Clap Your Hands Say Yeah	Burned		Secretly Distribution Records	
January 29	Cloud Nothings	What Kind of Hell Did You Survive?		Pure Noise	
January 29	Death from Above 1979	Private Lives		Last Gang, MNRK	
January 29	Inspiral Carpets	Burn Like the Sun		Scruff of the Neck Records	
January 29	The Interrupters	Battle Scars			
January 29	Jaguar Jonze	Beast Master		Nettwerk	
January 29	Johanna Warren	Frog in the Belly of a Snake		Soul Selects Records	
January 29	Jonah Yano	Spin		Innovative Leisure	
January 29	Lisa LeBlanc	Patchwork		Bonsound	
January 29	Memoriam	Endgame		Reaper Entertainment	
January 29	MxPx	Living in the Chaos			
January 29	Remember Monday	Can We Press Rewind		Silva Screen Records, So What? Recordings	
January 29	Runnner	Love Songs from the Hottest Summer on Record		Amuseio AB	
January 29	Seven Kingdoms	Sono Sola		Reigning Phoenix	
January 29	Seventh Wonder	VII		Frontiers	
January 29	Silent Planet	Infinite Sleep		Pure Noise	
January 29	Simple Minds	Sacrosanct		BMG	
January 29	The Spook School	Like a Heartbeat		Alcopop!, Slumberland	
January 29	ViVii	I Thought I Would Be Somewhere Else by Now		Dumont Dumont	

=== February ===
List of albums to be released in February 2027
Go to: January | March | April | May | Unscheduled and TBA | Back to top
Release date	Artist	Album	Genre	Label	Ref.
February 5	The 69 Eyes	Acustica		BlkIIBlk	
February 5	As I Lay Dying	As I Lay Dying		Napalm	
February 5	Cage the Elephant	Dying in Reverse		Big Loud	
February 5	Charlotte Adigéry and Bolis Pupul	Mainland Madinina		Deewee, Because Music	
February 5	Extreme	Paris Rising		earMUSIC	
February 5	Flower Face	Kill the Muse		Nettwerk	
February 5	A Hawk and a Hacksaw	Volume 8			
February 5	Impending Doom	At the Throne of God			
February 5	Kula Shaker	K-Reinkarnate		Strange F.O.L.K. Records	
February 5	Luisa Almaguer	Sin Lázaro		Mixta Music	
February 5	Palehound	You Sing Like You're Joking		Polyvinyl	
February 5	Thundermother	Mothers of Thunder			
February 5	Ulrika Spacek	Field to the Left		Full Time Hobby	
February 12	Anna Meredith	Darling		Mercury KX	
February 12	Currents	Our Fates Lie in Tandem		Rise	
February 12	Cyco Miko	My Personal Revolution		BMG	
February 12	George FitzGerald	Lima Romeo			
February 12	Gun Ghaol	Eadar Bàs Is Bruadaran			
February 12	Indigo Sparke	There Is a Light on the Horizon Line		Everwilde Records	
February 12	Julien Baker	This World or the Next		Matador	
February 12	Junior Boys	The Gore		City Slang	
February 12	Kerry King	The End of All Gods		Reigning Phoenix	
February 12	Mamalarky	Hover		Epitaph	
February 12	Pins	If I'm Alive Now, Then I Was Dead		Haus of Pins	
February 12	Pulled Apart by Horses	Dopamine Hits		Damage Limited Records	
February 12	Robert Cray	All Over Again			
February 12	Ryan Adams	Animal		Pax-AM Records	
February 12	Serenity	Melancholia		Napalm	
February 12	Sex Week	Ears as an Organ of Touch		Grand Jury Records	
February 12	She Wants Revenge	The Loved			
February 12	Sleeper	End of the World		Gorsky Records	
February 12	Sugababes	Sugababes		Sacred Three, The Orchard	
February 12	Tusks	Do I See You There?		One Little Independent	
February 17	Simon Laffy	Encoda			
February 19	200 Stab Wounds	Lowest Form		Metal Blade	
February 19	Beabadoobee	Bananas 4 Cats		Dirty Hit, Interscope	
February 19	Dutch Uncles	Polygon Hotel		Memphis Industries	
February 19	Everything but the Girl	Blue Reservoir		Virgin Music	
February 19	Firewind	Gods, Myths & Titans		BlkIIBlk	
February 19	Hans Zimmer	Hans Zimmer Live – The Next Level		Sony Classical	
February 19	Heathen	Lifetime in Hell		Napalm	
February 19	Mallory Knox	Afterglow			
February 19	Marika Hackman	False Dogs		Chrysalis	
February 19	Miki Berenyi Trio	Spoil the Busy Flames		Bella Union	
February 19	One Step Closer	Zero			
February 19	Tash Sultana	Sonic Alchemy		BMG	
February 19	Tim Reaper	World's End		Hyperdub	
February 19	Zsela	The Party		Nice Life	
February 26	Blondie	High Noon		BMG	
February 26	Brokeback	Colder, Milder		Thrill Jockey	
February 26	Cody Jinks and the Tonedeaf Hippies	And, Again		Late August Records	
February 26	Coi Leray	Multi		Epic	
February 26	The Delines	The Killing of a Motel Maid		Decor Records	
February 26	Jez Williams	Life of Me and You		Earth to Echo Records	
February 26	Noga Erez	Duck Season		Neon Gold, Atlantic	
February 26	Ralphie Choo	Charmain		Rusia-IDK Records, Warner Music	
February 26	Ryley Walker	Darkening the Glass		AD 93	
February 26	Shenandoah	If That Ain't Country		8 Track Entertainment	
February 26	Slash featuring Myles Kennedy and the Conspirators	Flying Blind		Gibson	
February 26	Stephen Wilson Jr.	Impressiøn of a Human // Children of the Cørnerman		Big Loud	
February 26	Steve Hackett	Through a Sea of Flames		Inside Out	
February 27	David Sylvian	The Distance Between the Killer and the Killing		Nanoq Records	
February 27	Particle Kid and Daniel Lanois	The Ocean Floor		Loosegroove	
February 27	Sam Amidon	Willing Brother Knowing		River Lea Records	
February 27	Sinkane	He's Gone		City Slang	

=== March ===
List of albums to be released in March 2027
Go to: January | February | April | May | Unscheduled and TBA | Back to top
Release date	Artist	Album	Genre	Label	Ref.
March 5	Bitter:Sweet	The One			
March 5	The Chats	Half Cut		Virgin Music	
March 5	Destroy Boys	Foie Gras		Epitaph	
March 5	Dynazty	Dark Arts		Napalm	
March 5	Eric Slick	Bounce House		Slick Records, Thirty Tigers	
March 5	Inferum	Adversity			
March 5	Liars	A Ban on Plastic Bag Bans			
March 5	Martin Garrix	Marty			
March 5	The Nightingales	Tinsel and Trifle			
March 5	Paloma Faith	In Full Colour!			
March 5	Staind	The Space Between the Darkness and the Light			
March 5	Tesseract	Arc_One: Obscura		Nuclear Blast	
March 6	Niki & the Dove	Beauty and Terror		The Satchi Six	
March 12	Bokassa	Anomalies			
March 12	Bruce Dickinson	PsychoGod			
March 12	Dan Smith and Ralph Pelleymounter	Misfits Together		Best Laid Plans Records, Tequila King Records, Abbey Road Recordings	
March 12	Dragged Under	Social Battery: Low		Mascot	
March 12	Erasure	Radio!! Radio!!		Mute	
March 12	Everything Everything	Poison Pop		BMG	
March 12	Gang of Youths	Compañero		Mosy Recordings, Sony, Arista	
March 12	Tindersticks	Dog Roses			
March 12	Willie J Healey	Lucky			
March 19	Alexisonfire	Bleed It		Dine Alone	
March 19	Archive	Not in My Name		Dangervisit	
March 19	Bullet for My Valentine	Social Apocalypse		Spinefarm	
March 19	DragonForce	DragonForce		Napalm	
March 19	Grand Slam	Slam!		Silver Lining Music	
March 19	Lanterns on the Lake	There's a Bird in My Ribcage		Dust & Matter	
March 19	Nelson	Amazing		Frontiers Music	
March 19	Noahfinnce	Wonky		Hopeless	
March 19	Orbital	Other		London	
March 19	Sum 41 and Deryck Whibley	Diamonds of the Night: Vol. 1		Rise	
March 26	Mo Pitney	Outskirts of Town		Curb	
March 26	Starcrawler	Kick Me			
March 31	Planningtorock	Gentlethem			

== Second quarter ==
=== April ===
List of albums to be released in April 2027
Go to: January | February | March | May | Unscheduled and TBA | Back to top
Release date	Artist	Album	Genre	Label	Ref.
April 2	Feet	Gung-Ho		Submarine Cat	
April 2	Glasvegas	Airy Fairy			
April 2	Hamish Hawk	Intriguer/Tenderness		So Recordings	
April 2	Ider	Looking Gorgeous, Expecting Everything		Nettwerk	
April 2	The Mission	Songs for Kith and Kin		Cooking Vinyl	
April 9	Fear Factory	Roboticist		Nuclear Blast	
April 9	Kingfishr	Weight of the Feather			
April 9	The Molotovs	Welcome to Urbia		Marshall	
April 9	Panchiko	Chimera		Nettwerk	
April 9	Snotty Nose Rez Kids	Daddy's Home		Savage Mob Records, Sony Music	
April 9	Wolves at the Gate	Borderland		Solid State	
April 16	Oh, Sleeper	Back to the Wild		Solid State	
April 23	Primal Fear	Shadow Riders		Reigning Phoenix	
April 30	Foy Vance	If			
April 30	Purple Disco Machine	Cosmotropia			

=== May ===
List of albums to be released in May 2027
Go to: January | February | March | April | Unscheduled and TBA | Back to top
Release date	Artist	Album	Genre	Label	Ref.
May 14	John Spillane	All Round the Island		Inspired Records	

== Unscheduled and TBA ==
List of albums to be released sometime in 2027
Go to: January | February | March | April | May | Back to top
Artist	Album	Genre	Label	Ref.
4 Non Blondes	1994			
Belphegor	TBA		Reigning Phoenix	
Björk	TBA			
Bombus	No Magic		Black Lodge	
Buckcherry	TBA			
Darko	TBA			
Def Leppard	TBA			
Gramps Morgan	TBA			
Howard Jones	Global Citizen			
Ice Nine Kills	The Silver Scream 3: Every Flick in the Book			
The Internet	TBA			
Justin Hawkins	TBA			
The Killers	TBA			
Living Colour	TBA			
The Obsessed	TBA		Heavy Psych Sounds Records	
Post Malone	The Eternal Buzz		Republic, Mercury	
Pretty Maids	TBA		Frontiers Music	
Roy Khan	TBA			
Snot	TBA		BlkIIBlk	
Soundgarden	TBA			
Stevie Wonder	Through the Eyes of Wonder			
