= Life Is Beautiful Music & Art Festival =

Annual festival in Las Vegas, USA

Life is Beautiful Music & Art Festival
- Genre: Hip hop, indie rock, experimental rock, EDM, alternative rock, pop
- Dates: Late September
- Locations: Downtown Las Vegas, Nevada
- Years active: 2013–present
- Organizer: Penske Media Corporation (2022–present)
- Website: lifeisbeautiful.com

Life is Beautiful Music & Art Festival is an annual music, culinary, art, and learning festival held in Downtown Las Vegas, Nevada, United States. It debuted in 2013 as a three-day event. In 2019, it was one of the world's highest grossing festivals with revenues of $17.7 million.

In February 2022, Penske Media Corporation (PMC) acquired a controlling interest in the festival. While some details of the deal were not disclosed, the purchase was made through subsidiary Rolling Stone.

== History ==
Founded by Rehan Choudhry in 2013, Life is Beautiful is a festival held annually in downtown Las Vegas, Nevada. WWD reported that “the festival has focused on building a brand aimed at uniting people around artistic experiences ranging from music to street artists such as Shepard Fairey, brands pooling together for experiences, small businesses and food, among other thing”.

In February 2022, a majority stake in the festival was acquired by Penske Media Corporation (PMC) via subsidiary Rolling Stone, with aims to pursue international expansion.

== Art ==
In addition to music, Life is Beautiful has a heavy focus on art providing its attendees with massive murals and interactive sculpture exhibits. The art features both local and international artists, as well as recycled installations from Burning Man. In 2017, art collective Meow Wolf created the fan favorite “Art Motel” converting the abandoned motel at 225 North Seventh Street into a digital wonderland of art, custom-made sound, lighting and projections. The collective revamped 17 rooms and the space's 5,900-square-foot courtyard. While the art motel did not return in 2018, that space was transformed into a new exhibit by Portuguese artist Bordalo. The new installation focused on collecting and arranging 10,000 ft of recycled trash which was then used to create six enormous animal structures, named “Wild Wild Waste”.

The Life is Beautiful Ideas series began 2015, with the idea of spreading positivity and inspiring messages to attendees. The list of speakers has included Bill Nye, IN-Q, Joe De Sena, Stacy London, Ru Paul, and Karamo Brown.

== Comedy ==
Comedy also plays a significant part in the Life is Beautiful lineup drop. The 2018 lineup included SNL's Pete Davidson, Michelle Wolf, and Hannibal Buress, along with Trixie Mattel from Ru Paul's Drag Race, and Jimmy O. Yang from HBO's Silicon Valley.

== Location ==
Life is Beautiful takes place in Downtown Las Vegas, Nevada over 18 blocks of the city. Temperatures during the festival range an average from 69º F to 94º F. Due to the urban landscaping of the surroundings, the festival rolls out 280,000 square ft of sod, providing attendees with cool spots to lay down in the shade and avoid the sun.

In the first five years of the festival, Life is Beautiful has contributed over $185 million of economic impact for the city of Las Vegas measured by a third party.

The September 2020 Life is Beautiful festival was cancelled due to COVID-19 concerns.

== Lineups ==
=== 2013 ===
Inaugural headliners were The Killers and Kings of Leon. Beck, Vampire Weekend, Passion Pit, Empire of the Sun, Childish Gambino, Pretty Lights, Jurassic 5, STS9, Purity Ring, Earl Sweatshirt, Danny Brown, Portugal. the Man, Dawes, Imagine Dragons, The Joy Formidable, Charli XCX, Haim, Capital Cities, Poolside, Janelle Monáe, Alabama Shakes, Joey Bada$$, Cults, Smith Westerns, Nico Vega, Zedd, Living Colour, Youngblood Hawke, Family of the Year, Robert Delong, Cayucas, Wallpaper, Twenty One Pilots.

=== 2014 ===
In 2014, the festival expanded to 3 days:

Line-up
| Friday, October 24 | Saturday, October 25 | Sunday, October 26 |
| Kanye West; The Weeknd; Panic! At The Disco; Girl Talk; The Head and the Heart; Phantogram; Jenny Lewis; Neon Trees; Baauer; Holy Ghost!; Switchfoot; RAC; MØ; Vintage Trouble; M4SONIC; Echosmith; Sleeper Agent; ASTR; Priory; Nostalghia; Rusty Maples | Outkast; Lionel Richie; The Flaming Lips; The Roots; Alt-J; TV on the Radio; Fitz and the Tantrums; Matt & Kim; G-Eazy; Kimbra; OK GO; Tycho; MS MR; DJ Mustard; J.Roddy Walston & The Business; The Preatures; Bear Hands; Ásgeir; DJ Cassidy; MisterWives; Catfish and The Bottlemen; Paper Route; Ekoh | Foo Fighters; Skrillex; Arctic Monkeys; Broken Bells; Kacey Musgraves; Little Dragon; A-Trak; Mayer Hawthorne; Tune-Yards; St. Paul & The Broken Bones; St. Lucia; Galantis; Trampled By Turtles; Ryan Hemsworth; Dizzy Wright; Nahko and Medicine for the People; The Orwells; Holychild; Moksha; Sabriel; Rabbit!; Love by Cirque du Soleil with Las Vegas Philharmonic Orchestra |

=== 2015 ===
In 2015 Life is Beautiful announced a partnership with Insomniac Events to increase the presence of electronic music offerings on the line-up. Insomniac curated the Troubadour stage with headlining acts Porter Robinson, Carnage, and Knife Party.

Line-up
| Friday, September 25 | Saturday, September 26 | Sunday, September 27 |
| Stevie Wonder; Major Lazer; Porter Robinson; Thievery Corporation; Hozier; Twenty One Pilots; Robin Schulz; Edward Sharpe and the Magnetic Zeros; AWOLNATION; Claude VonStroke; Cashmere Cat; X Ambassadors; Lindsey Stirling; BØRNS; Atmosphere; Klingande; Wave Racer; Felix Jaehn; Ryan Lofty; SZA; Rebelution; Shamir; Big Talk; Andra Day; Dan Deacon | Imagine Dragons; Snoop Dogg; Duran Duran; Chance the Rapper; Carnage; Audien; What So Not; GRiZ; Future Islands; SOJA; Metric; Glass Animals; Ab-Soul; Jauz; Clean Bandit; Big Data; Night Terrors of 1927; Royal Blood; New Politics; Salva; The Magician; Giraffage; Meg Myers; Leikeli47; Mercy Music; MIICS; Pia Mia; Alessia Cara | Kendrick Lamar; Weezer; Death Cab for Cutie; Knife Party; Kygo; Madeon; Brandon Flowers; Walk the Moon; BadBadNotGood; Against Me!; Halsey; Run the Jewels; Tchami; Saint Motel; Peking Duk; Mercer; Best Coast; Ryn Weaver; Two Gallants; 4B; The London Souls; Kaleo; Jared & The Mill; Lassi; Jill & Julia; The Green |

=== 2016 ===
Mumford & Sons, J. Cole, Major Lazer, G-Eazy, Empire of the Sun, The Lumineers, The Shins, Bassnectar, Flume, Tegan and Sara, Jane's Additction, Chromeo, ZHU, Leon Bridgers, Young the Giant, Galantis, Die Antwoord, Jimmy Eat World, Bloc Party, Dirty Heads, Duke Dumont, Kehlani, The Temper Trap, Third Eye Blind, KONGOS, Crystal Castles, Snakehips, City and Colour, Excision, Irration, Pete Yorn, The Naked and Famous, Alunageorge, Pete Yorn, Gramatik, Atlas Genius, Banks and Steelz, Bob Moses, Warpaint, Keys N Krates, Seven Lions, Band of Skulls, Kaytranada, Snails, Nothing But Thieves, Catfish and The Bottlemen, The Stumbellas, Jack Garratt, Kamasi Washington, Oh Wonder, Mr. Carmack, Raury, The Wombats, Bishop Briggs, The Heavy, Bomba Estereo, LANY, Highly Suspect, Jess Glynne, Autograf, Griffin, Ghastly, Mija, NF, Finish Ticket, Hey Marsielles, Rezz, Sir The Baptist, Lewis Del Mar, Coast Modern, The Shelters, CID, Durante, Spag Heddy, Anevo, Aaron Jackson, Aazar, Brittany Rose, Brumby, The Lique.

=== 2017 ===
Chance The Rapper, Muse, Gorillaz, Lorde, Blink-182, The xx, Kaskade, Wiz Khalifa, Pretty Lights, Cage the Elephant, Schoolboy Q, Zeds Dead, Slightly Stoopid, Pusha T, De La Soul, DREAMCAR, Matoma, Big Gigantic, Russ, Dua Lipa, Troy Boi, Kiesza, The Revivalists, J Boog, Big Wild, They., Coin, Ekali, Kali Uchis, Hayden James, Hippo Campus, Frenship, Whethan, Sigrid, SG Lewis, Middle Kids, Circa Waves, Day Wave, Ella Vos, Wingtip, Bearson, The American Weather, Cirque Du Soleil, Ideas Featuring Bill Nye, MGMT, Haim, 2 Chainz, ZHU, Milky Chance, Two Door Cinema Club, Tycho, Capital Cities, Lil Dicky, Tchami, Local Natives, Vince Staples, Sean Paul, Mura Masa, Deorro, RAC, Kyle, Broods, PVRIS, Goldroom, Sofi Tukker, Stick Figure, Tokimonsta, Mondo Cozmo, Jacob Banks, Tennyson, Shy Girls, Viceroy, San Fermin, Superpoze, Cameron, Calloway, The Rhyolite Sound.

=== 2018 ===
The Weeknd, Arcade Fire, Florence and the Machine, Travis Scott, DJ Snake, ODESZA, N.E.R.D.m Death Cab for Cutie, Tyler the Creator, Justice, Galantis, Bastille, Miguel, St. Vincent, RL Grime, A$AP Ferg, Slyvan Esso, The Neighbourhood, Jungle, What So Not, Blackbear, Flight Facilities, Sabrina Claudio, SOFI TUKKER, 3lau, Chvrches, Foster the People, French Montana, Santigold, Cold War Kids, Daniel Caesar, Alison Wonderland, T-Pain, The Drums, Robert De Long, DVBBS, Blood Orange, Wolfmother, Cashmere Cat, Gramatik, Lizzo, The Presets, Lane 8, AJR, Tribal Seeds, Ravyn Lenae, Superorganism, Party Favor, Two Feet, HINDS, Denzel Curry, Sir Sly, Sam Feldt, Welshy Arms, Elohim, Elderbrook, FLETCHER, Yungblud, Mt. Joy, Amy Shark, Chet Porter, Mikky Ekko, Knox Fortune, Morgan Saint, Wallows, Graves, Brasstracks, Neil Frances, O Wildly, Lovely The Band, Harry Hudson, Young Bombs, The Dirty Hooks, Mike Xavier.

=== 2019 ===
Line-up
| Friday, September 20 | Saturday, September 21 | Sunday, September 22 |
| Chance the Rapper; Billie Eilish; Portugal. The Man; Louis the Child; Walk the Moon; Tash Sultana; Lord Huron; Gryffin; King Princess; Gunna; A R I Z O N A; Conan Gray; Shallou; Bea Miller; Kasbo; Jonas Blue; Maxo Kream; Madison Beer; 070 Shake; Baynk; The Aces; Ookay; The Funk Hunters; Morgxn; Cub Sport; The Teskey Brothers; Zack Gray; Holy Ghost!; Arod; Crykit; JDHD; Yeisukee | The Black Keys; Lil Wayne; Janelle Monáe; Rüfüs Du Sol; Of Monsters and Men; Maggie Rogers; Monsta X; Dashboard Confessional; Jauz; Banks; Whethan; Chelsea Cutler; Pink Sweat$; Saint Jhn; Lost Kings; Cautious Clay; Space Jesus; Taylor Bennett; Flora Cash; Muna; Yung Bae; The Regrettes; Droeloe; Hermitude; Cub Sport; ViVii; Zack Gray; Blue Man Group; Freak On; Masteria; Morelia; Uknew | Post Malone; Vampire Weekend; Zedd; Rae Sremmurd; Phantogram; Toto; Sheck Wes; Carly Rae Jepsen; Slushii; Hot Chip; Shoreline Mafia; Oliver Heldens; Oliver Tree; Nervo; Lewis Capaldi; Scarypoolparty; Gallant; Masego; Polo & Pan; Durand Jones & The Indications; Phantoms; Anthony Russo; Crooked Colours; Tyla Yaweh; Bülow; Ryland James; Miles Medina; Ease; Faed; Nova; Yazz |

=== 2021 ===
Line-up
| Friday, September 17 | Saturday, September 18 | Sunday, September 19 |
| Tame Impala; Megan Thee Stallion; Glass Animals; Deepak Chopra; Don Toliver; LANY; Brittany Howard; Sam Smith; Sarah Cooper; Willow; Purity Ring; Ashnikko; Noah Cyrus; Sam Jay; Clozee; Shiba San; Lost Frequencies; Remi Wolf; Whitmer Thomas; Jammjam featuring Jacob Collier & Friends; Cannons; Bia; Hook n Sling; Ant Clemons; Raye; Please Don't Destroy; Marcella Arguello; Teddy Swims; Poorstacy; Midnight Kids; Sa-Roc; 90's Nite; Junior Sanchez; Oscar Molina; Lance Le Rok; Badbeat; Rob Fernandez | Green Day; Haim; Illenium; Deepak Chopra; Modest Mouse; Dillon Francis; Gabriella Wright; Ludacris; JID; Sarah Cooper; Surfaces; EarthGang; All Time Low; Bob the Drag Queen; Victoria Monét; Trevor Daniel; Drama; Cash Cash; Sam Jay; Caamp; Yaeji; Trevor Wallace; Whitmer Thomas; White Reaper; Slenderbodies; Annie Lederman; Chiiild; NOTD; Jacques Greene; Amy Allen; Raye; The Backseat Lovers; Anabel Englund; Sir Chloe; Tom the Mail Man; Brady Matthews; Ekoh; Monoky; Mija; Y2K Beat!; Yeisukee; Adam the DJ; Lio Sounds; Trent Jolly | Billie Eilish; ASAP Rocky; Young Thug; Fisher; St. Vincent; 6lack; Gorgon City; Death from Above 1979; Ekali; Shaed; Surf Mesa; Still Woozy; Emotional Oranges; Joel Corry; Half Alive; Alaina Castillo; Trevor Wallace; Alicia Keys; Jamila Woods; Annie Lederman; Odie; Jackie Schimmel's The Bitch Bible; LSDream; Mob Rich; Rachel Sennott; Evan Giia; Ford.; The Stiff Socks Podcast; Brijean; Brady Matthews; Ekoh; PapiChuloTeej; Four Color Zack; Faed; The Emo Night Tour; Beatbreaker; Ever B2B Fashen; E-Rock |

== Culinary line-ups ==
The Culinary lineup has recently become an add-on that is attractive to attendees, organized by culinary director Lee Flint, with the intention of “working with the local talent and making it more accessible to restaurants that may not have been able to participate in the past”. The 2018 culinary lineup included Justin Kingsley Hall of the Kitchen at Atomic, Brian Howard of Sparrow + Wolf, Harvest's Royd Ellamar, Hemant Kishore from the Toddy Shop and Good Pie's Vincent Rotolo.

Food Line-up
| Chefs | Restaurants |
| Brian Massie; Bryan Forgione; Carlos Buscaglia; Bruce and Eric Bromberg; Cat Cora; Donald Link; Duff Goldman; Francisco “Kiko” Ojeda; Hubert Keller; Jet Tila; Jonathan Waxman; José Andrés; Kim Canteenwalla; Lao Sze Chuan; Madison Cowan; Marc Forgione; Mike Minor; Mary Sue Milliken; Peter Bastien; Ralph Perrazzo; Richard Camarota; Sam Marvin; Rick Moonen; Scott Conant; Spike Mendelsohn; Shawn McClain; Susan Feniger | Aloha Kitchen; Andiamo; Artisanal Foods; Bronze Cafe; Carmine's; Culinary Dropout; Due Forni; Fleur by Hubert Keller; Forte; Function Juicery; The Funnel Cake Cafe; Fresh ‘n’ Nova; Garden Grill; Gimme Some Sugar; Hash House a Go Go; Hearthstone Kitchen & Cellar; Hummus Factory; Kuma Snow Cream; MTO Cafe; Nacho Daddy; Nobu Las Vegas; O Face Doughnuts; Oming's Kitchen; Origin India; Palm Restaurant; Popped; RM Seafood; Sausagefest; Spud Shots and More; Stripchezze; Tacofest; Tbone Chophouse and Hank's Fine Steaks; The Twisted Lemon; Tornado Potato; TruckUBarbeque; Truffles n Bacon; Truk-N-Yaki; Z India Catering Co. |

== Art line-up ==
Art Line-up
Artists

- Aaron Sheppard
- Anthony Ausgang
- Audrey Barcio
- BICICLETA SEM FRIEO
- Borondo
- Camilla Quinn
- Charlotte Dutoit
- CYRCLE
- D*Face
- Edoardo Tresoldi
- Eric Tillinghast
- Fintan Magee
- Gina Quaranto
- Jerry Misko II
- Jesse Smigel
- JK Russ
- Jonah Schoenmann
- Las Vegas Academy
- Lakwena
- Li-Hill
- Linda Alterwitz
- Marty Walsh
- Maser
- Matthew Couper
- Miguel Rodriguez
- Misaki Kawai
- Jevijoe Vitug
- Patrick Duffy
- ROA
- Sush Machida “Gaikotsu”
- Spencer Olsen
- SANER
- Tim Bavington
- Thomas Dambo
- Trifecta Gallery
- VAST Space Projects
- Zak Ostrowski

== Learning line-up ==
Learning Line-up
Speakers

- Pussy Riot
- Penn & Teller
- Isaiah Austin
- José Andrés
- Amelia Rose Earhart
- Oscar Goodman
- Tony Hsieh & Fred Mossler
- Adam Braun
- Sue Bryce
- Demetrious Johnson
- Rehan Choudhry
- Andy Grignon
- Eric Weinstein
- Marie Forleo
- Kavita Shukla
- Lizzie Velasquez
- Zubin Damania
- Giles Duley
- Dr. Gabor Forgacs
- Andrew Hessel
- David J. Peterson
- John Rennie
- Joy Sun
- PES
- Jill Vialet
- Ed Gavagan & Sekeena Gavagan
- Mel & Patricia Ziegler
- Justin & Meghan Sylvester
- Shiza Shahid
- Peter Aguero
- Raghava KK
- Paul Mattingly
- Scot Nery
- Ric Elias
- Neda Ulaby
