= Something Good =

Something Good may refer to:

- Something Good (Catherine Porter album), 2002
- Something Good (Claire Rousay and Zander Raymond album), 2027
- "Something Good" (Bic Runga song), 2002
- "Something Good" (Utah Saints song), 1992
- "Something Good" (Alt-J song), 2012
- "Something Good" (Richard Rodgers song), 1965, a song from the film The Sound of Music
- "Something Good", by Estelle from True Romance
- "Something Good", by Pacific Avenue, 2019
- "Something Good", by Paul Haig, 1989
- Something Good – Negro Kiss, 1898 short film

== See also ==
- "I'm into Something Good", a 1964 song by Herman's Hermits
