= Tresoldi =

Tresoldi is an Italian surname. Notable people with the surname include:

- Carlo Tresoldi (1952–1995), Italian footballer
- Edoardo Tresoldi, Italian sculptor
- Libero Tresoldi (1921–2009), Italian Roman Catholic bishop
- Nicolò Tresoldi (born 2004), German-Italian footballer
