= A Firmer Hand =

2024 studio album by Hamish Hawk

Studio album by Hamish Hawk
- Released: 16 August 2024
- Recorded: April 2023
- Studios: Post Electric, Leith
- Genres: Sophisti-pop; post-punk; art rock; gothic rock
- Length: 38:20
- Labels: So; Fierce Panda
- Producer: Rod Jones

Hamish Hawk chronology
Angel Numbers (2023)	A Firmer Hand (2024)	Intriguer/Tenderness (2027)

Singles from A Firmer Hand
- 1. "Big Cat Tattoos" Released: 29 April 2024; 2. "Nancy Dearest" Released: 13 June 2024; 3. "Men Like Wire" Released: 8 July 2024

A Firmer Hand is the third studio album by Scottish musician Hamish Hawk, released on 16 August 2024 by Fierce Panda and So Recordings. The album was written by Hawk, guitarist Andrew Pearson and drummer Stefan Maurice in 2022–2023. It was produced in Edinburgh by frequent collaborator and manager Rod Jones. Hawk designed the album artwork, alongside Stuart Ford, which features a black and white portrait of the singer with his face half obscured by a black shadow. Its title refers to a line from the song "Big Cat Tattoos" and highlights the defiant nature of the record.

A Firmer Hand deviates sonically and thematically from Hawk's previous output and deals with darker subjects relating to sexuality. It features a wide array of genres that include sophisti-pop, post-punk and art rock, with influences from gothic rock, indie rock, new wave, synthwave and elements of funk. Instrumentally, it incorporates synthesisers, piano, bass, guitar and drums, eschewing the baroque sound of previous records, as the band wanted to recreate the studio sounds live without altering its line-up. Its lyrical content, autobiographical in nature, focuses on Hawk's relationships with men and explores themes of sex, lust, rejection, masculinity, shame and sexual repression. The album was released to positive reviews from critics, who mostly praised Hawk's musical evolution and the more direct lyricism. A Firmer Hand debuted at number twenty-two on the UK Albums Chart, becoming Hawk's first ever top forty placement on the list. It also debuted at number one in his native Scotland. The album has been shortlisted at the 2025 Scottish Album of the Year Award. Prior to its release, the album was promoted by the singles "Big Cat Tattoos", "Nancy Dearest" and "Men Like Wire".

== Background and recording ==
Hawk's second studio album, Angel Numbers, was released in February 2023 to critical acclaim, and further established Hawk and his band on the indie scene. Hawk wrote "Questionable Hit" while recording Angel Numbers, but felt the song "didn't fit" on that record, as it was very different thematically. After that drummer Stefan Maurice sent Hawk a keys loop that became "Machiavelli's Room", when he finished writing that song he had the same thought as with the former, "Ok, I don't think a song like that is gonna sit very comfortably with songs that sound like Angel Numbers". By the time the previous album was released Hawk said they had "the bulk of a new album written", and that it would be recorded at some point that year.

The sessions took place in April 2023, and the band once again joined forces with frequent collaborator Rod Jones, who produced the record at Post Electric Studio in Leith, Edinburgh. The recording featured no additional members and all the instruments played on the album are the ones played on-stage. Hawk contrasted this experience with the recording of Angel Numbers, which he described as "kind of chamber-poppy in its execution." He also added that those self-imposed limitations "have made the songs sound bigger and hopefully make more of an impact on the listener". The band thought of recording all their parts live, but only the drums and bass were done that way.

== Composition ==
=== Musical style and influences ===
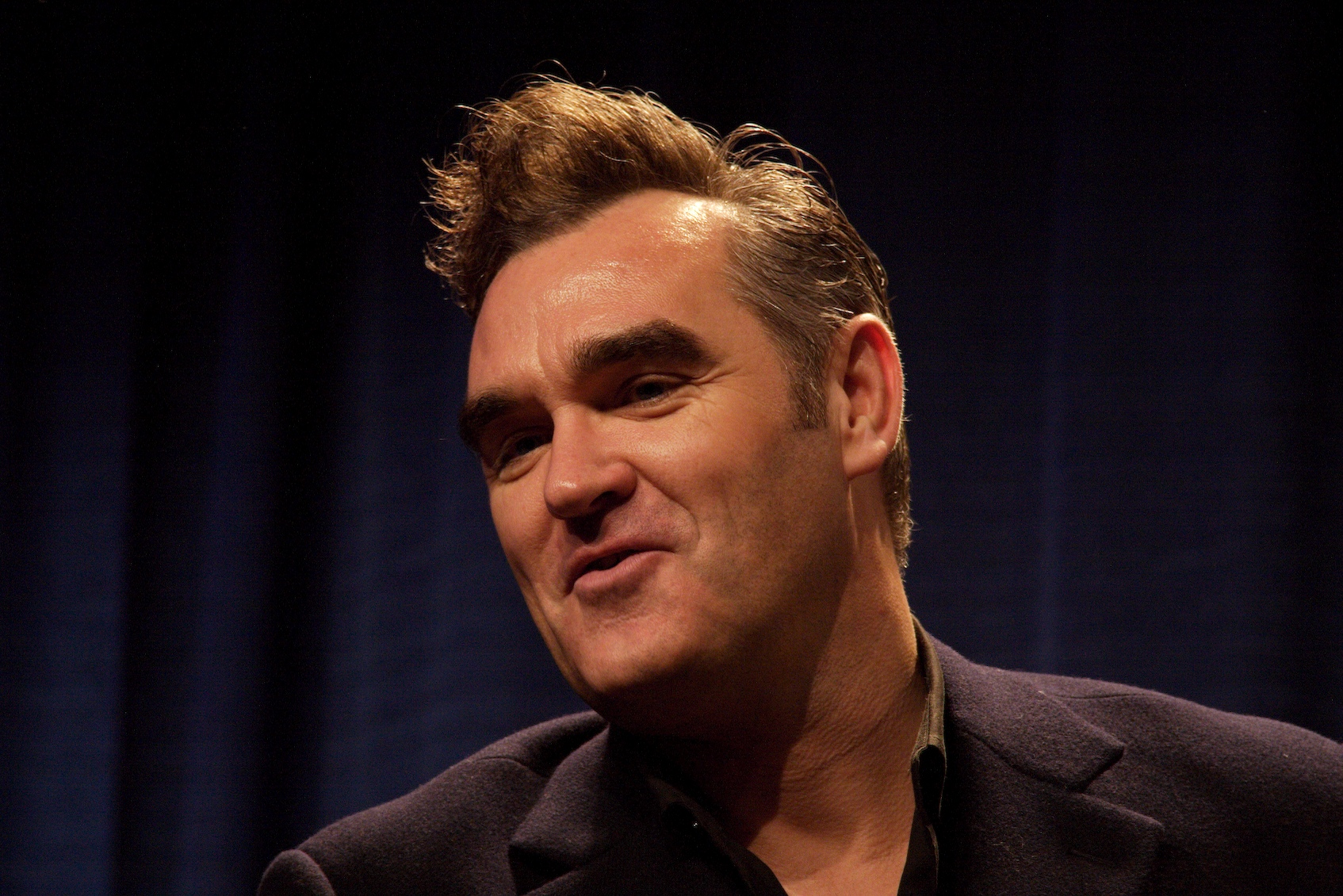
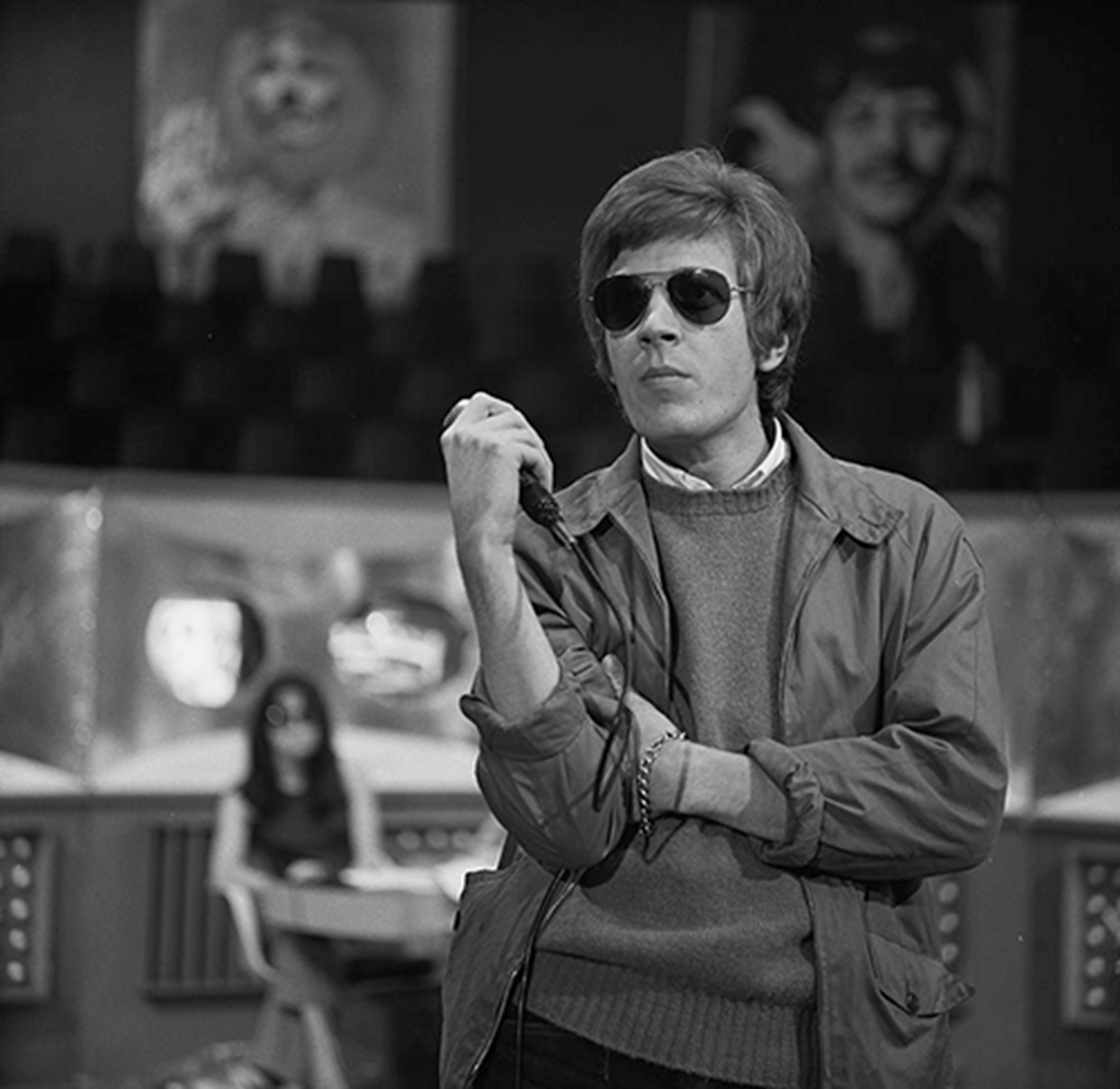
Morrissey (left) and Scott Walker (right) were cited by several music critics, as having influenced the album's style.

A Firmer Hand has been characterised as sophisti-pop, indie rock, art rock, gothic rock and synthwave, also drawing influences from post-punk and new wave music. The album has been compared to the works of Morrissey, Neil Hannon, Stephin Merritt, Scott Walker, Paul Haig Michael Gira and Baxter Dury as well as the Hidden Cameras, New Order, Depeche Mode, Talking Heads, the Smiths and Franz Ferdinand. Hawk has mentioned some of the songs on the album reminded him of bands such as Pet Shop Boys, Culture Club, Bronski Beat and Soft Cell. He said, "what I find exciting and inspiring about bands like the Pet Shop Boys is that they are openly gay without sanitizing it. Especially in the wake of something like the AIDS crisis".

=== Lyrics and themes ===
"I would say the romance has fallen away to a degree. It is still there, but it's been replaced in part with a slightly more erotic heart, a lustful side, a desiring side, [...] Whether they're long-term relationships, flirtations, or one-night stands, this album deals more with a masculine currency and energy".

— Hamish Hawk

A Firmer Hand is an album centered on Hawk's relationships with the men in his life including friends, lovers, family and colleagues. It has been described as a "rich anthology of diary entries, homoerotic encounters, vainglorious men and unreliable narrators", as well as, approaching "the haunted psychosexual drama of Pulp's This Is Hardcore" (1998), with Hawk's songwriting being, "sometimes arch and frequently ribald". Male sexuality became the album's focus through writing the tracks "Machiavelli's Room", "Milk an Ending" and "Juliet as Epithet". Hawk noted that after he had written those songs, the album was going to be "less embellished, less florid in its language", he also noted a "maturation" compared to his previous records, and a "growing unwillingness to compromise" with his audience. He pointed out that the link between all the songs is a "sense of the unsaid". Like previous records, the album contains references to cultural figures and elements such as Franz Kafka, Tommy Cooper or George Harrison's All Things Must Pass. Hawk said, "These names are tools, just like any other words in my songs, to create something, to build something unique in the listener's mind."

== Artwork and title ==
The album's artwork features a black and white portrait of Hawk with his face half obscured by a black shadow, taken at a show in Blackpool in 2023. On the artwork, Hawk stated "sometimes you get the sense that certain albums have certain color palettes. [...] I do think even with the artwork and the songs, it's a dark record". The album's title is in reference to a line from the album's first single, "Big Cat Tattoos". It highlights the defiant nature of the record, and is a rejection of concerns over the audience response to the album's subject matter: "I've pushed through that because I am, as I say, a people pleaser. I thought I'd try and take up less space, and now I'm not doing that quite as much", Hawk said. At first the album had a different working title, which Hawk described as being "slightly more romantic" than the current one. The title was changed at the encouragement of guitarist Andrew Pearson.

== Release and promotion ==
The release of A Firmer Hand was first announced on 29 April 2024. That same day several tour dates were announced, taking place through May until August, including in-store and out-store gigs to promote the record. Before the album was announced Hawk had already premiered a few songs from A Fimer Hand live in 2023, including "Big Cat Tattoos" and "You Can Film Me", which was first performed just a week after Angel Numbers was released.

=== Singles and videos ===
The album's lead single "Big Cat Tattoos" premiered on Steve Lamacq's BBC Radio 6 Music show, on 29 April 2024. The next day an accompanying music video was released, directed and edited by guitarist Andrew Pearson. The video was recorded at Freakworks in Leith, and features Hawk in a film studio, with five faceless men dressed in black suits standing in it, while Hawk dances around. In June, the second single, "Nancy Dearest" was released alongside a music video, also directed and edited by Pearson. Shot between Freakworks and Nobles Bar, it seems to serve as a prequel to the previous single video. In it, the faceless men in suits appear at a bar, and the "Big Cat Tattoos" set is featured again. In July, the third single, "Men Like Wire" premiered on Steve Lamacq's BBC Radio 6 Music show. That same day a music video, once again directed and edited by Pearson, was released on Hawk's YouTube channel. Like the preceding videos, it was shot at Freakworks in Leith, and featured Hawk wearing the same outfit, surrounded by the faceless men in suits.

=== Tour and other performances ===
In April 2024, Hawk announced tour dates in promotion of the album, including several solo support slots for Villagers across Central Europe and the UK, in May and June. On 21 July, the band supported Elbow on their show at Englefield House, and joined Travis on several dates in August and December across Europe and the UK. Hawk and the band also performed at several music festivals including Stag & Dagger, Belladrum Festival, Greenbelt Festival and Huw Stephens' Sŵn Festival among others. On 31 July Hawk performed live acoustic versions of "Men Like Wire", "Bridget St. John", "Juliet as Epithet" and "The Mauritian Badminton Doubles Champion, 1973", for German radio station Radioeins at their studios in Berlin. Other live sessions were recorded for Deutschlandfunk Kultur and BBC Radio 4's Loose Ends. On 7 August, Hawk performed a live set hosted by Vic Galloway, for BBC Radio Scotland, at the Dynamic Earth in Edinburgh. Another live session was recorded at Maida Vale Studios for Steve Lamacq's show, where the tracks, "Machiavelli's Room" and "Disingenuous" were premiered. On 11 September, Hawk announced a headline tour of the UK that took place in February 2025.

== Critical reception ==
Professional ratings
Aggregate scores
Source	Rating
AnyDecentMusic?	8.0/10
Metacritic	81/100
Review scores
Source	Rating
Far Out	4.5/5 stars
Financial Times	4/5 stars
The Line of Best Fit	8/10
Mojo	4/5 stars
MusicOMH	4.5/5 stars
Record Collector	4/5 stars
Shindig!	4/5 stars
The Skinny	5/5 stars
The Times	4/5 stars
Uncut	6/10

A Firmer Hand received positive reviews from contemporary music critics. At Metacritic, which assigns a normalised rating out of 100 to reviews from mainstream critics, the album received an average score of 81, based on 8 reviews, which indicates "universal acclaim". Aggregator AnyDecentMusic? gave it 8.0 out of 10, based on their assessment of the critical consensus.

Roy Wilkinson of Mojo said "the huge exhilaration of Hawk's previous two albums has largely been replaced by more troubled moods", and noted A Firmer Hand had more stylistic variety, while maintaining Hawk's skilled lyricism. For NARC's Dawn Storey, the album reiterates that Hawk's work "demands repeated listens to uncover all its pleasing subtleties" and she praised the band for taking risks. The Skinny named A Firmer Hand as their Album of the Month, and reviewer Mia Boffey claimed Hawk had "pulled off a hat-trick" following his two previous records; she also noted the album is "steeped in an authenticity and forwardness of the most soul-bearing variety". The album was also more "urgent" than its predecessors, for Ludovic Hunter-Tilney of the Financial Times, who highlighted Hawk's voice as one of the reasons to keep listening. Chris Twomey of Shindig! said the album, "It's tuneful" and "thought-provoking", adding that it "will resonate with most if they bother to listen to the words". For Record Collector, David Pollock, noted Hawk continued to make music with "an effortless confident swagger" that stood right beside his influences, adding, "a major talent continues to flourish". Julia Mason of God Is in the TV thought that with, A Firmer Hand, Hawk "has given us an insight into his world, warts and all" and praised the lyrics and instrumentation, with the band producing "an album bursting with originality and heartfelt emotion". The Quietus named it Album of the Week, and reviewer Luke Turner commended Hawk for eschewing "the platitudes of empowerment" often found in contemporary queer records, adding, "A Firmer Hand feels fresh without needing to be entirely sonically original." Victoria Segal of The Times also reacted positively to the album, calling it "a perfectly integrated pop record — erudite, carnal, alert to the world's absurdity and its own. The cathedral can wait." John Murphy of MusicOMH said the album was able to "skip from one musical style to the other, without ever losing the cohesion" and claimed it was Hawk's best record to date. In another positive review, Gareth Allen of Louder Than War, wrote "It is a brave, fully formed, and wholly successful artistic statement. It deserves to do very well indeed."

Stephen Dalton of Uncut was not as complimentary and described the instrumentation and lyrics as "overwrought" and "slightly too pleased with themselves". Nevertheless, Dalton thought the album themes were, "tastefully upholstered in robust analogue indie-rock" and praised Hawk's vocal performance in the tracks "Big Cat Tattoos" and "Questionable Hit".

=== Accolades ===
A Firmer Hand was shortlisted at the 2025 Scottish Album of the Year Award, an annual prize awarded to an outstanding album produced by a Scottish artist. The winner receives a £20,000 prize and the nine shortlisted artists receive £1,000. This is the third time Hawk was shortlisted for the award.

Select year-end rankings for A Firmer Hand
Publication/critic	Accolade	Rank	Ref.
BBC Radio 6 Music	Albums of the Year 2024	—	
God Is in the TV	GIITTV: Albums of the Year for 2024: 50 – 26	47	
Mojo	75 Best Albums of 2024	64	
MusicOMH	musicOMH's Top 50 Albums Of 2024	30	
Piccadilly Records	End of Year Review 2024 Top 100 Albums	23	
The Quietus	The Quietus Albums of the Year	42	
The Skinny	The Skinny's Scottish Albums of 2024	4	
Slant Magazine	The 50 Best Albums of 2024	38	
Under the Radar	Top 100 Albums of 2024	81	
Vic Galloway	Album of the Year 2024	1	

== Commercial performance ==
A Firmer Hand reached number eight in the mid-week chart. It finally debuted at number twenty-two on the UK Albums Chart, becoming Hawk's first ever top forty placement on the list. The album debuted at number one in Scotland and reached number two on the Official Record Store Chart and number three on the UK Independent Singles and Albums Chart.

== Track listing ==
All lyrics are written by Hamish Hawk; all music is composed by Andrew Pearson, Stefan Maurice and Alex Duthie.

A Firmer Hand track listing
No.	Title	Length
1.	"Juliet as Epithet"	2:39
2.	"Machiavelli's Room"	4:39
3.	"Big Cat Tattoos"	3:11
4.	"Nancy Dearest"	3:05
5.	"Autobiography of Spy"	3:00
6.	"You Can Film Me"	3:38
7.	"Christopher St."	1:33
8.	"Men Like Wire"	3:16
9.	"Questionable Hit"	3:41
10.	"Disingenuous"	2:56
11.	"Milk an Ending"	2:39
12.	"The Hard Won"	4:03
Total length:		38:20

== Personnel ==
Credits adapted from album liner notes.

- Hamish Hawk – vocals
- Andrew Pearson – guitar, backing vocals
- Stefan Maurice – drums, keyboards
- Alex Duthie – bass, backing vocals
- John Cashman – keyboards

Production

- Rod Jones – production, mixing
- Ed Woods – mastering

Artwork

- Hamish Hawk – design
- Stuart Ford – design
- Michaela and Richard Simpson – photography

== Charts ==
Chart performance for A Firmer Hand
Chart (2024)	Peak position
Scottish Albums (Official Charts)	1
UK Albums (Official Charts)	22
UK Independent Albums (Official Charts)	3
