= Gemini Moon =

Gemini Moon may refer to:

- "Gemini Moon", a song by Bryan Ferry from the album Mamouna
- "Gemini Moon", a song by Caitlin Rose from the album Cazimi
- "Gemini Moon", a song by Reneé Rapp from the album Snow Angel
- Gemini Moon, an EP by Mia Joy
- Gemini Moon, a character from the television series Zoe Ever After
