= Rockaway Beach Festival =

Alternative rock music festival in England

Rockaway Beach is an annual music festival in England, held at the Butlin's holiday resort in Bognor Regis. It was founded by Ian Crowther in 2015, devised as a live mixtape that would differ from other festivals by having as few stage time clashes as possible, compared to other festivals. The festival has previously seen appearances from some of the world's biggest touring live acts including Gary Numan, Echo and the Bunnymen, Killing Joke, and Orchestral Manoeuvres in the Dark.

The festival is uniquely held in an English seaside town in the middle of winter, being the first weekend of each January. It is noted as the only major music festival that was able to take place in 2020 due to following events being cancelled during the covid pandemic, and also for being the first music festival headlined by both Fontaines DC and Porridge Radio.

The event has also showcased three winners and a further 21 nominees of the Mercury Prize including Suede (band), Jarvis Cocker, English Teacher, Self Esteem, Fontaines DC, Tricky, Barry Adamson, The Jesus and Mary Chain, Jah Wobble, Saint Etienne, Leftfield, Maxïmo Park, Young Knives, The Horrors, Wild Beasts, Ghostpoet, Young Fathers, Soak, Anna Meredith, Georgia, Porridge Radio, Black Country, New Road, Nova Twins, and Yard Act.

== History ==
The first Rockaway Beach event was in October 2015, moving to the January of each year from 2018 onwards. The 2020 edition of the event went ahead a few months before the Covid pandemic forced numerous events to be cancelled across the country, making it one of the only live music events which happened that year. It then took 2021 off as many other UK and international live shows did, returning in 2022.

Artwork for the festival is inspired by the New York subway iconography. The event itself taking its name from the Rockaway Beach area of New York, which is also a song by New York punk band The Ramones. Due to its timing in January, it is regarded as an early tastemaker event in the live music calendar, being regularly covered by national and music press including The Times, The Guardian, and NME.

== Format ==
The festival happens at the Butlin's resort in Bognor Regis. It is a non greenfield festival, meaning there is no camping at the event. Instead guests stay in accommodation such as hotels and chalets which are incorporated into the festival's perimeter. This also includes a swimming pool complex, arcades, and various bars and restaurants on the festival site.

Live artists perform across two live stages, which are run in tandem. The festival hosts around 35 live performances at each edition across three days and nights, which span the first Friday, Saturday, and Sunday in January.

Over the years the festival has added fringe programming outside of live music performances, which include pool parties, Q&As with artists, pub quizzes, film and documentary screenings, themed silent discos, and artist bingo. Some of the notable artists that have participated in Q&As with a live audience have included Killing Joke, Gary Numan, Yard Act, Leftfield, The Cribs, and The Jesus and Marychain.

Best-selling author John Robb (musician) has conducted many of the live conversations during the event, alongside author John Duran, Radio X DJ Sunta Templeton, and Chris Hawkins.

DJs perform after the live artists. A mainstay and regular DJ collaborator has been BBC Radio 6 Music's Steve Lamacq who performed multiple times. Other notable special DJ guests have included Tim Burgess (musician) of The Charlatans (English band), Chris Hawkins, Terry Hall (singer) of The Specials, and members of Idles.

The festival is primarily post-punk, punk, alternative, alt-pop, new wave, and electronic orientated and is attended by an audience of over 18-year-olds. Due to musical genres the festival caters for, alongside being held at a family holiday resort (despite being an adults-only weekend), Rockaway Beach has been compared to All Tomorrow's Parties (festival) which ran from 1999 to 2016.

== 2015 ==
Echo and the Bunnymen, Spiritualized, and Johnny Marr headlined the festival, with performances also from The Fall, Young Fathers, and Public Service Broadcasting.

== 2016 ==
Suede (band), Saint Etienne (band), and Killing Joke headlined the festival, with performances also from Wire, We Are Scientists, and The Wedding Present. The Quietus noted that, "Suede were on compellingly romantic form."

== 2018 ==
The event was moved from October to January, meaning there was no festival held in 2017. Instead the next edition was the following January, in 2018.

Wild Beasts, The Horrors, and Peter Hook & The Light headlined the festival, with performances also from The Orb, Alabama 3, and Gang Of Four.

It was notable for being one of the final live performances by the band Wild Beasts before they split up.

== 2019 ==
Echo and the Bunnymen, Gary Numan, and Maxïmo Park headlined the festival, with performances also from Goat Girl, Art Brut, Algiers, Terry Hall, Squid, and The Luka State.

== 2020 ==
The Jesus and Mary Chain, Fontaines DC, and John Cale of the band The Velvet Underground headlined the festival, with performances also from Black Country New Road, Self Esteem, Nova Twins, The Wedding Present, and Heavy Lungs.

The year was notable for having the first festival headline performance by Fontaines DC, who were announced to headline before their debut album was released.

== 2022 ==
Due to Covid, there was no event in 2021. Following a spike in the Omicron variant of Covid, much of the line-up was changed in the weeks heading into the festival though, to account for artists that were no longer able to travel or perform. The event went ahead with a revised line-up to the one originally announced.

Jarvis Cocker, Porridge Radio, and Tricky headlined the festival, with performances also from A Certain Ratio, Buzzcocks, The House of Love, and Do Nothing.

== 2023 ==
It was announced by NME that Self Esteem would headline the festival, alongside Orchestral Manoeuvres in the Dark, and Peter Hook & The Light. Other performers included from Yard Act, Anna Meredith, and Billy Nomates.

Self Esteem had previously played at the festival in 2020, returning in 2023 as a headliner. The year also saw the first UK performance of Sonic Boom and Panda Bear (musician)'s collaborative "Reset" project.

2023 saw new collaborator Chris Hawkins (BBC Radio 6 Music) join the festival, hosting artist conversations in front of an audience.

In March 2023, God Is in the TV championed the diversity and gender balance of the festival, drawing attention to its regular booking of an equal amount of both male and female artists, including multiple female headliners as well as artists of colour.

== 2024 ==
In May 2023, it was announced by NME that Sleaford Mods, The Cribs, and The Selecter would headline the festival, with performances also from Bob Vylan, The Vaselines, Big Special, Hinds, and Skids.

2024 saw a collaboration with Fierce Panda Records over the weekend, with label founder Simon Williams delivering a keynote conversation about the label alongside author, musician and broadcaster John Robb (musician).

== 2025 ==
In May 2024, it was announced that the next edition of the festival was set to take place on 3–5 January 2025 with headliners Spiritualized, who played at the first edition of Rockaway Beach, as well as Leftfield and RIDE. Arab Strap, Georgia, SPRINTS, The Itch, The None, Hamish Hawk, and Bodega were also confirmed.

During this edition, the festival used a new stage on the Butlin's site called Studio 36, that had been newly built.

The Times were among those to review the festival. Focusing on Spiritualized's performance, the publication noted "the band gave 2025 a grandiose launch", while Dork magazine stated "Rockaway Beach is still the best way to blow out the cobwebs and start the year strong".

== 2026 ==
The 2026 edition of the festival happened between 2-4 January. The line-up featured Public Image Ltd, English Teacher, Soft Play, Idlewild, Dry Cleaning, Antony Szmierek, Inspiral Carpets, Ellur, and The Moonlandingz.

The Times reviewed the event, calling it "outrageously deviant" awarding it 4 stars out of 5. DORK magazine called it "the best place on Earth" in their review.

== 2027 ==
Dates for the 2027 edition were announced as being January 8th to 10th.

== Response ==
The festival has received praise from national newspapers as well as music industry press over the years. The Quietus called the festival "Truly enjoyable," The Guardian saying it's "a weekend of diverse indie rock that's often as bracing as the wind whipping off the Channel," and Dork (magazine) has said "There's no better way to start the year than Rockaway Beach." The Times has called the festival "a riot".
