= Hamish Hawk =

Scottish musician (born 1991)

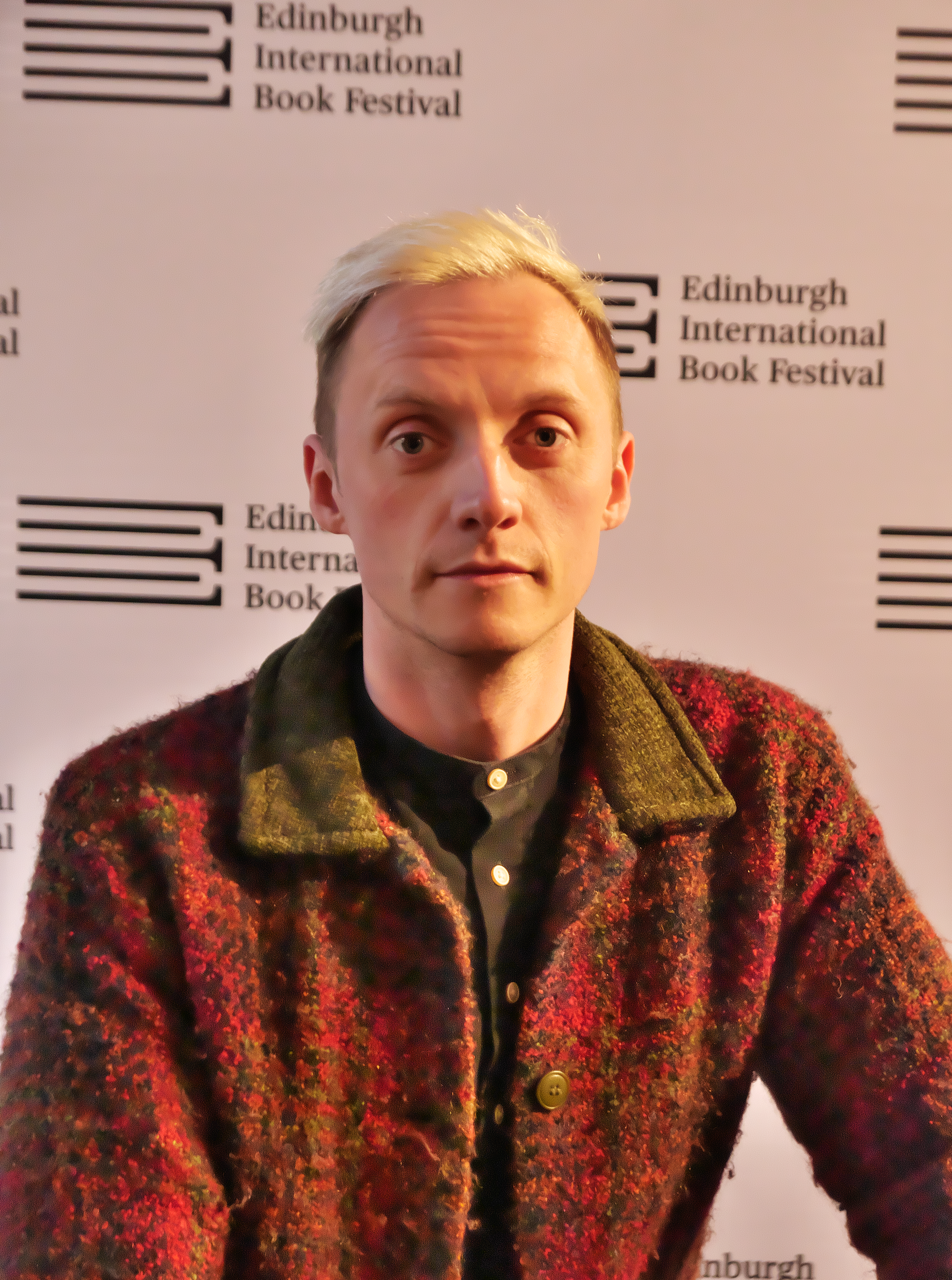
- Hawk in 2025
- Born: Hamish James Hawk; 27 October 1991 (age 34); Edinburgh, Scotland
- Citizenship: United Kingdom; New Zealand
- Education: University of St Andrews
- Occupations: Musician; singer; songwriter
- Musical career
- Genres: Indie pop; chamber pop; post-punk
- Instruments: Vocals; guitar; keyboards
- Years active: 2012–present
- Label: So Recordings

Hamish James Hawk (born 27 October 1991) is a Scottish musician. Hawk began his career in 2012 while he was a student at the University of St Andrews, and released his debut solo record, Aznavour (2014), under the mentorship of Scottish musician King Creosote. A year later he formed a band to back him up during live performances, and played with them under the name Hamish Hawk & the New Outfit. They released their first record From Zero to One in 2018, and an EP Laziest River in 2019. Laziest River was produced by Idlewild's Rod Jones, whom they had met in 2016. In 2021, now performing with the band as Hamish Hawk, he released his first album, Heavy Elevator, followed by Angel Numbers (2023), both produced by Jones and shortlisted for the Scottish Album of the Year Award in 2022 and 2023, respectively. His third album, A Firmer Hand, was released on 16 August 2024.

== Early life ==
Hamish James Hawk was born in Edinburgh in October, 1991, the youngest of three siblings. His father, Iain Hawk, is a former graphic designer from New Zealand. His mother was a midwife, and later a postmistress, from Yorkshire. He was raised in Edinburgh's Fairmilehead district. His music taste was shaped by what his family listened to, his parents loved the Rolling Stones, Elton John, Bob Marley, James Taylor and Cat Stevens, his sister was "a Britpop fan", while his older brother introduced him to bands like Pixies. As a child Hawk was a Disney fan, discovering bands like Franz Ferdinand, the Strokes, and the White Stripes in his teens.

Hawk loved performing and thought of getting into acting, he applied for drama school at the Royal Conservatoire of Scotland, but was unsuccessful. He attended guitar classes in primary school, and started writing his own songs at around 15. At the end of high school he had formed a band called Little Egypt with schoolmate, and future bassist, Alex Duthie and friend Ewan Douglas. At school he was a German exchange student. Hawk attended the University of St Andrews where he studied International relations, graduating in 2014.

== Career ==
=== 2012–2019: Early music ===
Hawk played on several bands and was part of the music society at St. Andrews, helping put shows together. In 2012 he published his first EP Moon Out West under his full name, Hamish James Hawk, on indie label Common Records. The label was created by close collaborator, Andrew Pearson, whom he met while studying at St Andrews. He recalled his first show "was an extremely short set made up entirely of covers", including two Arctic Monkeys songs, at Studio 24 in Edinburgh. Hawk met musician Kenny Anderson, best known as King Creosote, at one of those gigs on campus, and passed him a ten-song demo he had recorded, looking for advice. "He really loved the songs, and from then on, the whole thing snowballed in a really natural way. King Creosote mentored me through my first two releases and gave me the opportunity to perform at Fence Records events in Fife". Hawk has recalled. Anderson took Hawk on tour with him, and produced his debut record, Aznavour. The album, which was independently released in 2014, featured a few songs already included on Moon Out West, and was described as "Withered Hand meets Magnetic Fields and the songs would not be out of place on the latter's classic 69 Love Songs". Hawk followed the album with Mull, an EP released in 2015. The EP was recorded in the Isle of Mull at An Tobar, produced by Anderson, and released on his short-lived label, Boer Records.

After Anderson asked Hawk to support him at a gig at the Perth Concert Hall, he started a backing band "to bulk up the sound and amp up the volume". Hawk recruited friends Andrew Pearson on guitar, Alex Duthie on bass, John Cashman on keys, Stefan Maurice on synths and accordion, and Barry Carty on drums. They named the project Hamish Hawk & the New Outfit. Shortly after, Hawk applied for a job at the Assai Records Edinburgh store, and handed the owner a 10" copy of the EP. While at the Iona Village Hall festival in 2016, Hawk and his band met Rod Jones of Idlewild, who was interested in recording with them, this later led to them playing supporting slots for Idlewild. Hawk and his band re-recorded some songs from his first record and released a demo of "Oh, Bernard" on Pearson's label Common Records.

In 2017, Hawk accompanied American musician Brendon Massei, on a tour playing houses across America. The two drove through 26 states, "starting in Washington then going to New York, down to Georgia and west all the way to California". Hawk recalled. He spent those six weeks writing and three songs, "China & Down", "Swannanoa" and "Jackie O". were released later that year, as part of a handmade CD of which only 50 copies were made. That same year Hawk and the band had finished recording their first album together, From Zero to One, the album featured some songs that were already included on Mull, namely "Snuff", "Dashing White Sergeant" and "Hubble Space Telescope", which were re-recorded to fit the band. From Zero to One was produced by Gordon Maclean and released on 23 March 2018 digitally through Epifo Music, and on Vinyl through Assai Recordings. A year later, he released his second EP, Laziest River, on May 3. Following the advice of his boss at Assai, the record featured three of the songs he had released in 2017, plus five other tracks produced by Jones and recorded at his studio in Leith. Instrumental piece, "Jude the Obscure", was penned by Hawk's band member, Stefan Maurice.

=== 2020–2024: Breakthrough ===
By early 2019 Hawk had already started writing material for what would become his next record, Heavy Elevator. This time Hawk, still as the sole lyricist, composed the songs with Maurice and Pearson. Rod Jones came back as producer, and also became one of the band's managers. They recorded the album at his Post Electric Studio in Leith, and by September 2019 the album was done. Hawk and the band received funding from Creative Scotland to complete the album. Initially to be published in 2020, the release date got pushed due to the COVID-19 pandemic, and was finally released on 17 September 2021 via Assai Recordings. In support of the album Hawk and his band went on tour across the country, they supported Franz Ferdinand at a show in Dunfermline and later performed at South by Southwest in March 2022. Heavy Elevator was shortlisted at the Scottish Album of the Year Award that same year, which resulted in a £1000 prize. The album was chosen as one of the best albums of the year by The Skinny, Vic Galloway, and Otis Hart of NPR. The follow up to Heavy Elevator was an EP Covers, which featured four renditions of the Jesus and Mary Chain's "Happy When It Rains", Courtney Barnett's "Need a Little Time", Leonard Cohen's "Suzanne" and the Smiths' "Please, Please, Please, Let Me Get What I Want". The last two tracks had already been released on Hawk's YouTube channel in 2021, and recorded in December 2020 and February 2021, respectively. In August, Hawk played a support slot for Simple Minds at the Princes Street Gardens. Hawk said of that moment, "I saw Franz Ferdinand play on that stage in 2005 and I remember it so vividly. [...] So to make these steps and get to these points where there potentially could be someone in the audience who is the same age that I was then, looking up at me and going 'Oh wow'…it's something else".

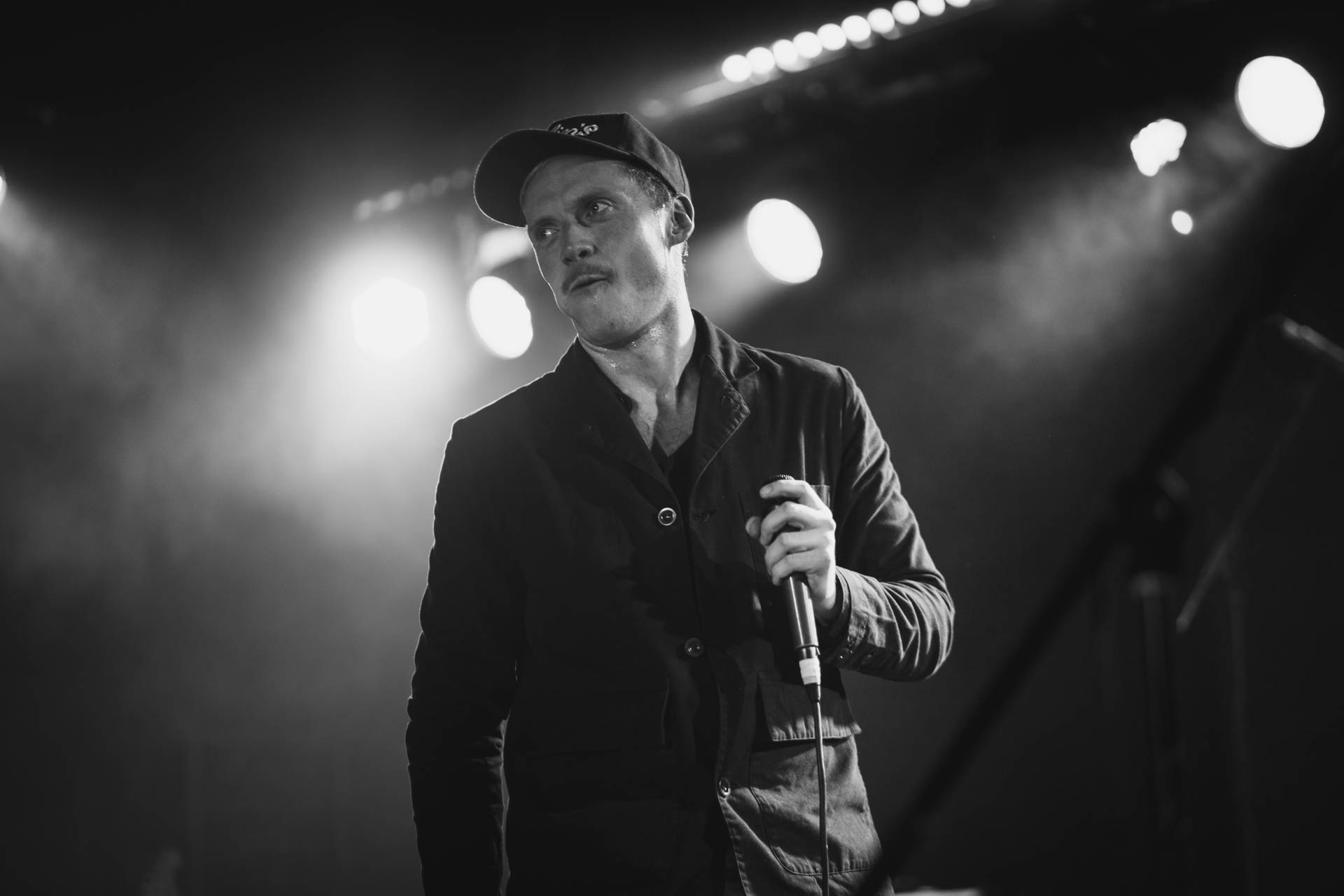
Hawk performing in 2023

By January 2022, Hawk was in the process of recording his second album, Angel Numbers, and later that year it was already finished. Most of the songs were written in 2020 during lockdown, "It was this ridiculous purple patch Andy and I had, we just kept writing. There was a two week period where we were writing a song a day", he recalled. Hawk has described the record as "very much a product of its time", it was produced by Rod Jones, and recorded at his Post Electric Studio. The album was released on 3 February 2023 via Post Electric, and peaked at 1# in the UK Indie Breakers Chart and at 55# in the UK Albums Chart in March 2023. It received positive reviews from critics. He played at South by Southwest for the second time, and that summer supported the Proclaimers on three dates in Scotland. Angel Numbers was shortlisted for the 2023 Scottish Album of the Year Award, it was the second time Hawk was up for the award. The album appeared on several publications best of the year lists, such as Mojo, The Skinny, and God Is in the TV.

On 29 April 2024, Hawk announced his third album, A Firmer Hand, alongside its tracklist and cover. The same day the album was announced, its first single, "Big Cat Tattoos", premiered on Steve Lamacq's BBC Radio 6 Music show. The album focuses on his relationships with the men in his life, and has been described as an "anthology of diary entries, homoerotic encounters, vainglorious men and unreliable narrators". Hawk performed solo as a support act for Villagers on ten dates of their European tour through late May and early June. On 13 June, Hawk premiered the album's second single, "Nancy Dearest". The third single of A Firmer Hand, "Men Like Wire", was released on 8 July. On July 21, the band supported Elbow on their show at Englefield House, and will join Travis on several dates in August and December, across the UK and Europe. Produced by Jones at Post Electric Studios, A Firmer Hand, was released on 16 August via So Recordings and Fierce Panda. It debuted at number twenty-two on the UK Albums Chart, becoming Hawk's first ever top forty placement on the list. It also debuted at number one in his native Scotland. The album was well received by critics. In September 2024, Hawk announced a headline tour of the UK, that took place throughout early 2025. He was part of the top forty on The List 's Hot 100 Scottish Cultural personalities of 2024. A Fimer Hand was shortlisted at the 2025 Scottish Album of the Year Award, the third time Hawk has been up for the award.

=== 2025–present: Covers II and Life in a Scotch Sitting Room, Vol. 0 ===
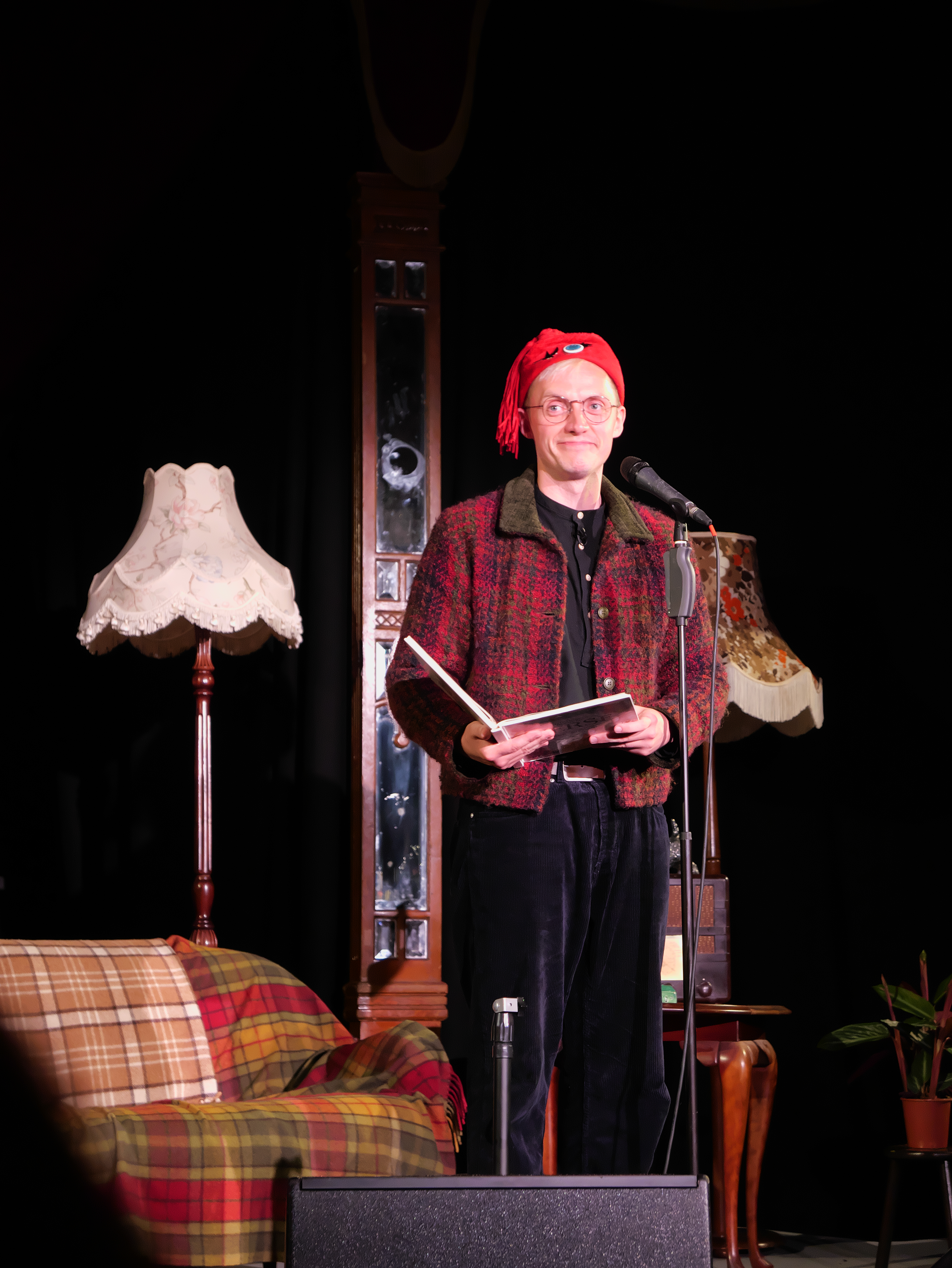
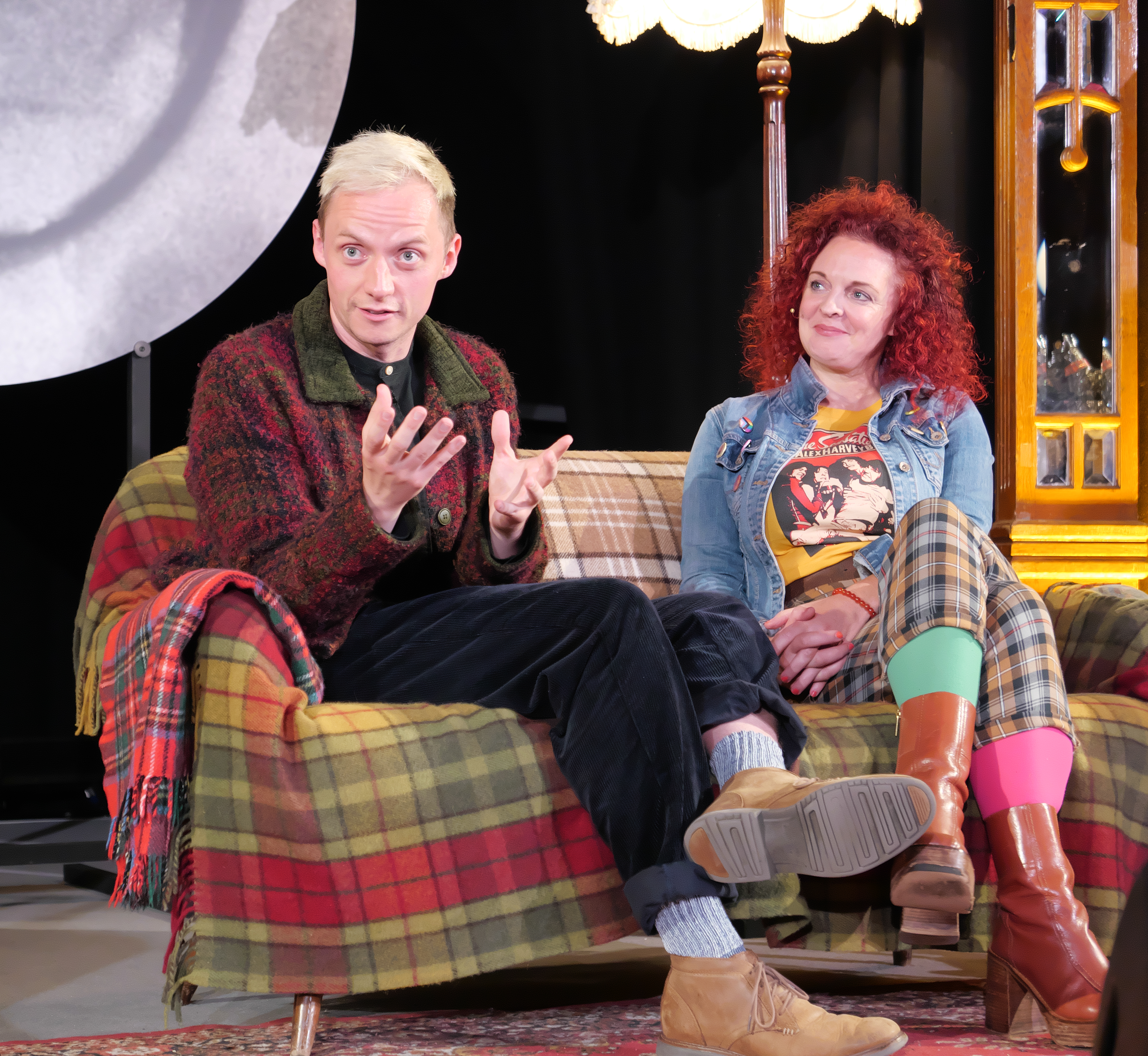
Hawk as Cutler (left) and Nicola Meighan interviewing Hawk (right).

In January 2025, Hawk appeared at the Rockaway Beach Festival, and covered two tracks at the Celtic Connections' Roaming Roots Revue in Glasgow. In May of that year Hawk premiered a version of Madonna's "Burning Up" (1983) on Steve Lamacq's BBC Radio 6 show, the single was part of the EP Covers II, which was released in September 2025. Hawk's version of Pet Shop Boys' "So Hard" was featured at number twenty on The Quietus Tracks of the Year list.

Hawk premiered a one-man show at the Edinburgh International Book Festival, inspired by Ivor Cutler's Life in a Scotch Sitting Room, Vol. 2 and featuring backing music from Pearson and Maurice. Cutler's own harmonium was used for the performance. Hawk was motivated to create the show at the suggestion of festival director Jenny Niven, who approached him about making a bespoke project. An album featuring tracks performed at the show was released in December 2025, it received a four star review from Fiona Sheperd at The Scotsman. Hawk featured on "Ultra Aura Glow" a track from Voka Gentle's third album, Domestic Bliss.

== Artistry ==
=== Influences ===
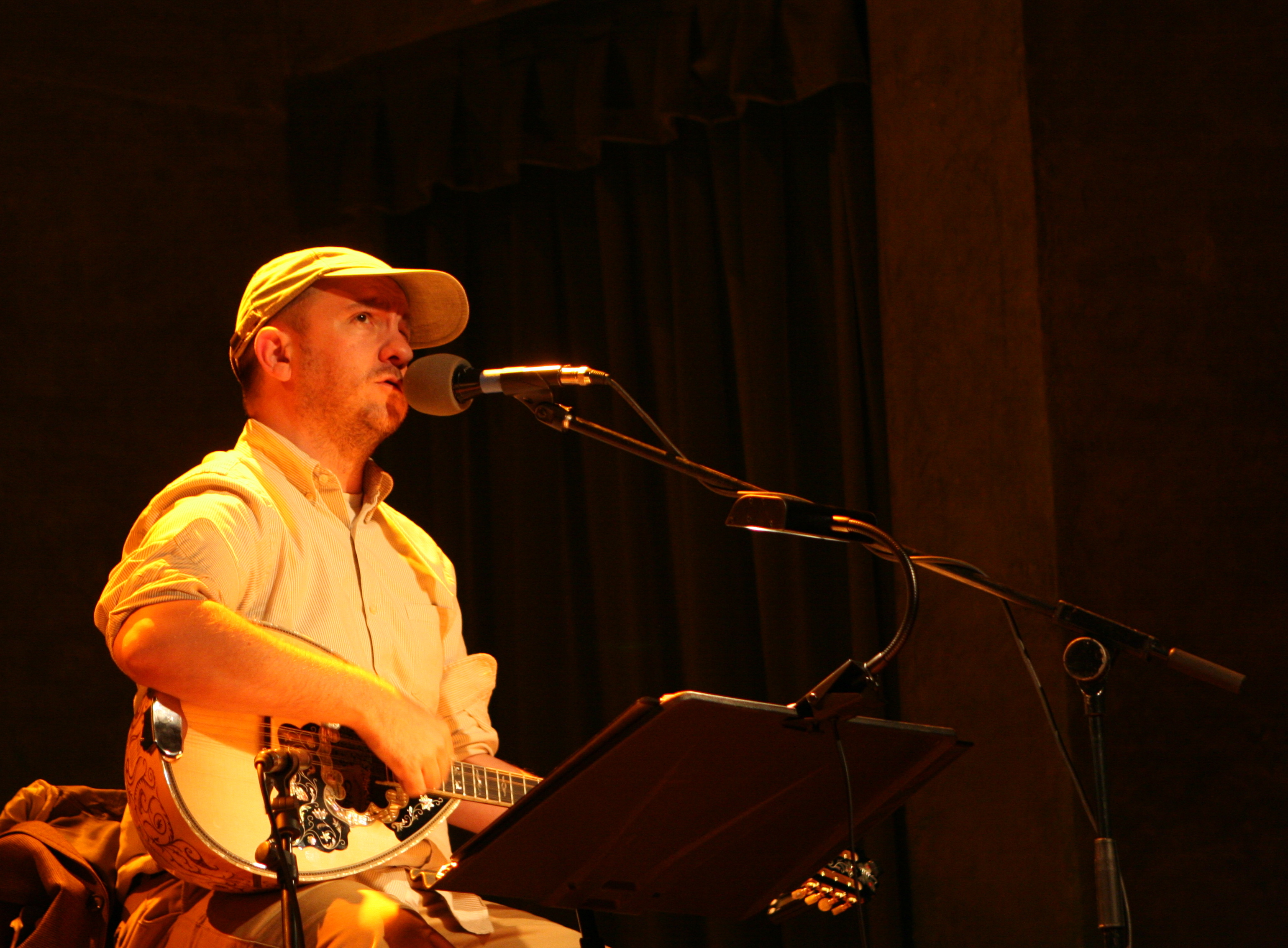
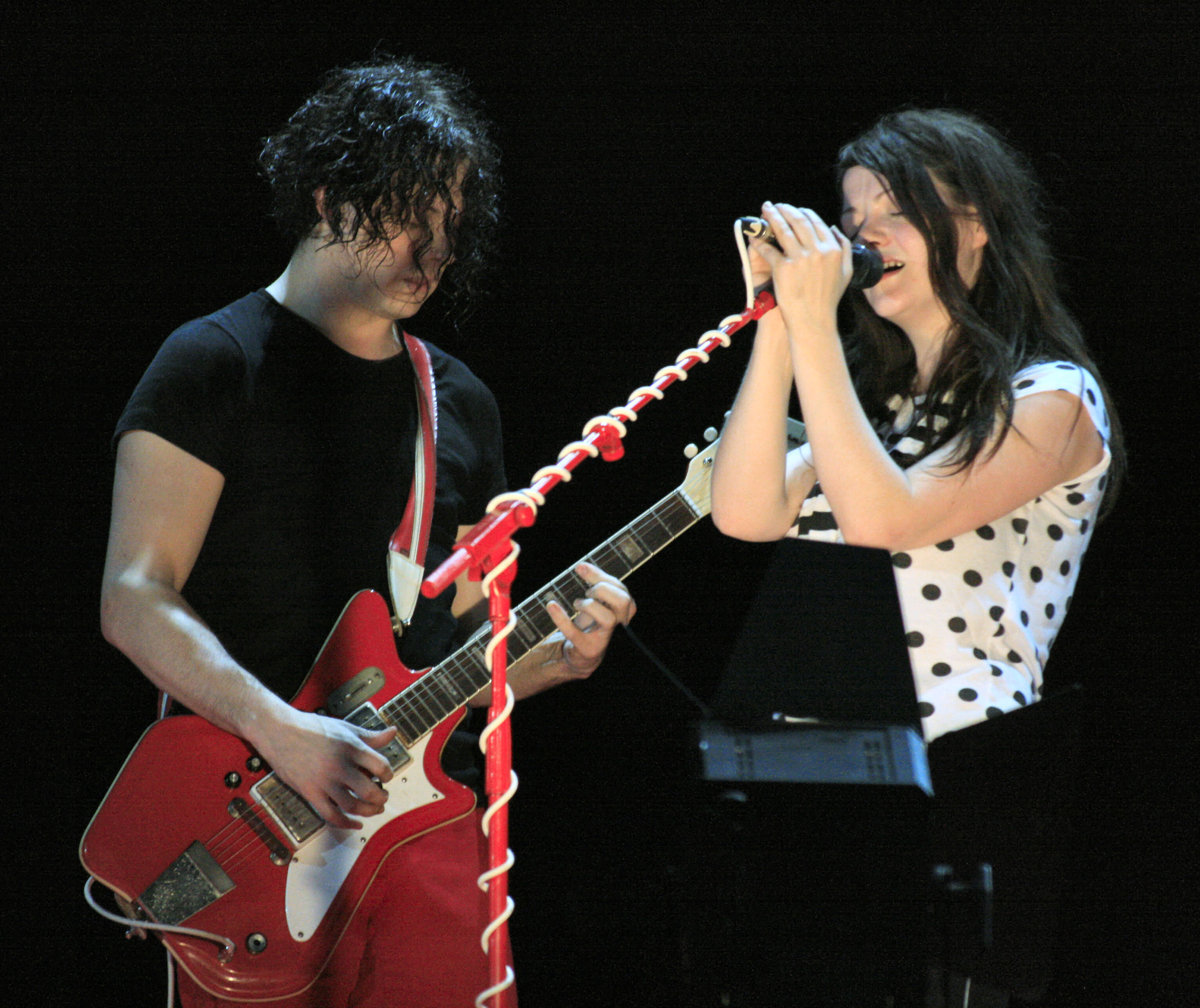
Stephin Merritt (left) and the White Stripes (right) have influenced Hawk.

The first albums Hawk recalls buying and owning as a teenager were by the White Stripes, Franz Ferdinand, and the Libertines. He has named Stephen Fretwell as an influence as he encountered his music while learning guitar chords for the first time, "That record [Magpie] was it. Whatever it is that I've got going here, it started because of that record. I know it back to front, and there are songs on it that my hands habitually start playing when I pick up a guitar to this day". Hawk credited Arctic Monkeys for inspiring him to explore new sounds: "They really did take something from the indie movement, but consistently, in my mind, do it better than all of their contemporaries. They evolve." He later discovered bands like Pulp and the Smiths, and was heavily influenced by Jarvis Cocker and Morrissey. Other bands that serve as inspiration are Talking Heads and XTC.

Hawk has said some of his favourite albums are Antony and The Johnsons' I Am a Bird Now (2005), The White Stripes' self titled record (1999), The Magnetic Fields' 69 Love Songs (1999), Camera Obscura's Let's Get Out of This Country (2006), Withered Hand's Good News (2009), Bill Callahan's Sometimes I Wish We Were an Eagle (2009), Bob Dylan's Blood on the Tracks (1975), Purple Mountains' self titled (2019) and The Velvet Underground's The Velvet Underground & Nico (1967).

Some of his lyrical heroes include, Leonard Cohen, Stephin Merritt, Randy Newman, Joni Mitchell, Bob Dylan, Nick Cave, Dory Previn, Vic Chesnutt and Neil Tennant. He has also cited Scottish poet Ivor Cutler as a source of inspiration.

=== Songwriting ===
"I don't write in personas. ‘I'm a 48-year-old … whatever it might be.’ I don't do that, They start with me. They will start with a couplet or an observation or a symbol or a feeling. They are me at that point. But what I will do with them between that and the end point is pull and stretch them and throw them around and see how they react to other things. I'll exaggerate and embellish. And often what I will do is match a feeling with what I feel is its symbolic partner, attach it to an image, a symbol, or a reference point, and see what kind of song that makes."

— Hawk for The Herald, 2021

Although at the beginning of his career Hawk wrote all his music alone, now along with guitarist Andrew Pearson, and drummer Stefan Maurice, they function as a songwriting unit. He writes the lyrics, while Pearson and Maurice focus more on the musical composition. Hawk has said that he comes up "with the words and basic structure for a song" alone, and later shares it with the other members when he feels they are ready. "It's important for any song to be able to work on a solo level", he added. Hawk has described himself as a "perfectionist", and the process of writing as, "an all-consuming experience where everything else in my life falls away". He often includes references to pop-culture or other artists in his music: "I don't want people to think that I'm shoehorning references in to appear literate, wise or worldly. [...] Lots of these references are all about the sound of the words and so on. As much as the references need to have that personal connection, you can bank on me not bringing it in for a frivolous reason." When told that his lyrics were described as "abstract", he disagreed, "I don't think my lyrics are particularly abstract, I think odd, off-kilter or offbeat maybe."

Hawk's musical style has been described as indie pop, and chamber pop, with influences from post-punk. Hawk has referred to his sound as "Lyrically driven alternative pop music". Nevertheless, he prefers not to label his musical style, "We don't deal in genres, my career has been an exercise against that. I don't want to be pigeonholed. I've always felt quite comfortable with the fact that the songs on the album will be cohesive, insofar as they all involve the same people putting them together." Hawk's third album A Firmer Hand, further incorporates art rock, gothic rock and new wave sounds.

=== Voice ===
Hawk has been described as a baritone crooner. And has been compared to Neil Hannon, Scott Walker, and Morrissey. He has cited Charles Aznavour, Jaques Brel, Morrissey, Cohen and Merrit as vocal influences, citing their "high drama sort of voice" as a reason. He described their vocal technique as "storytelling, very witty, very funny, but very dramatic. Everything sounded like something was going to happen. It feels like watching a play"

== Personal life ==
Hawk lives in Edinburgh and likes to swim in his free time. He has had relationships with both men and women, but prefers to not label his sexuality.

== Backing band ==
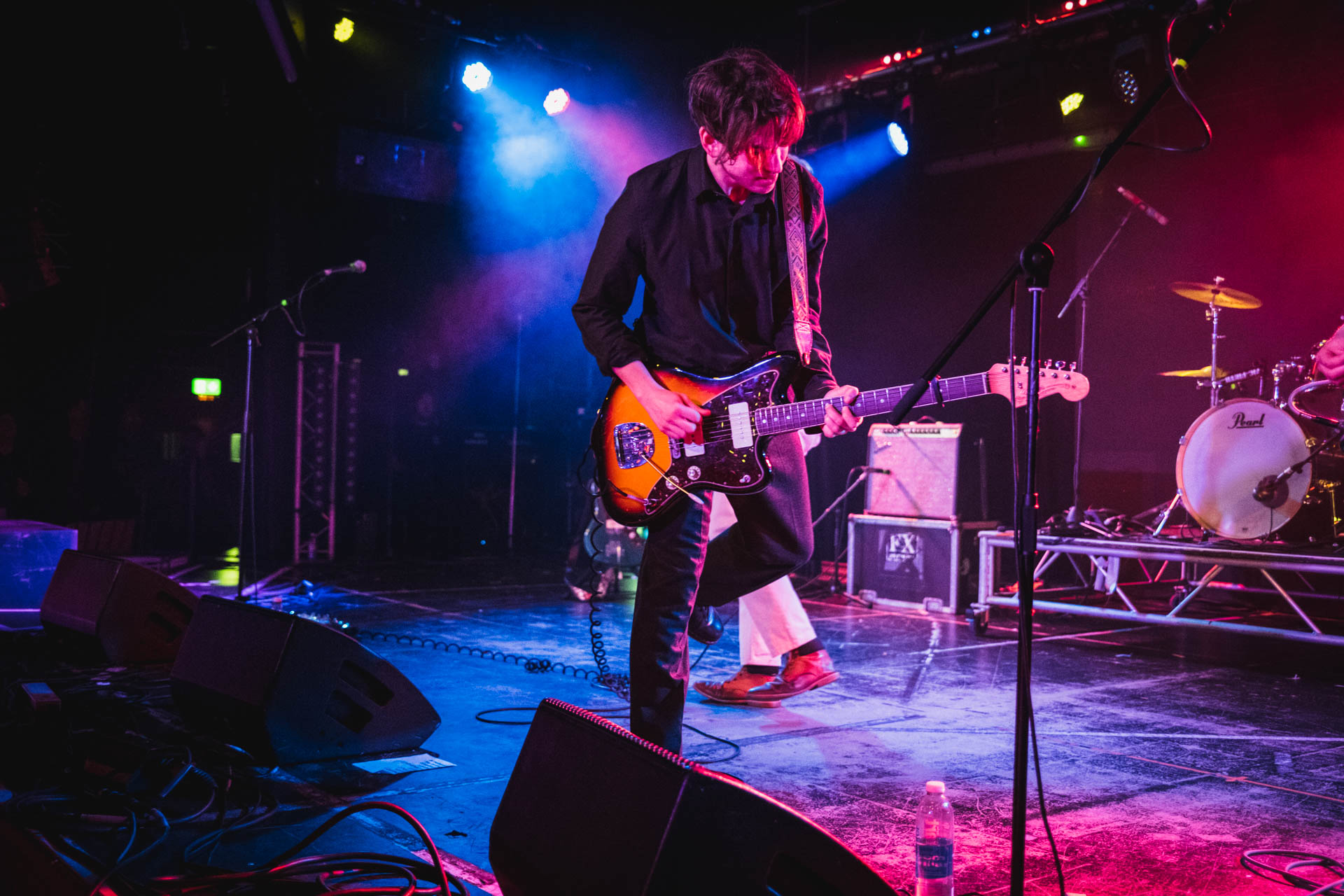
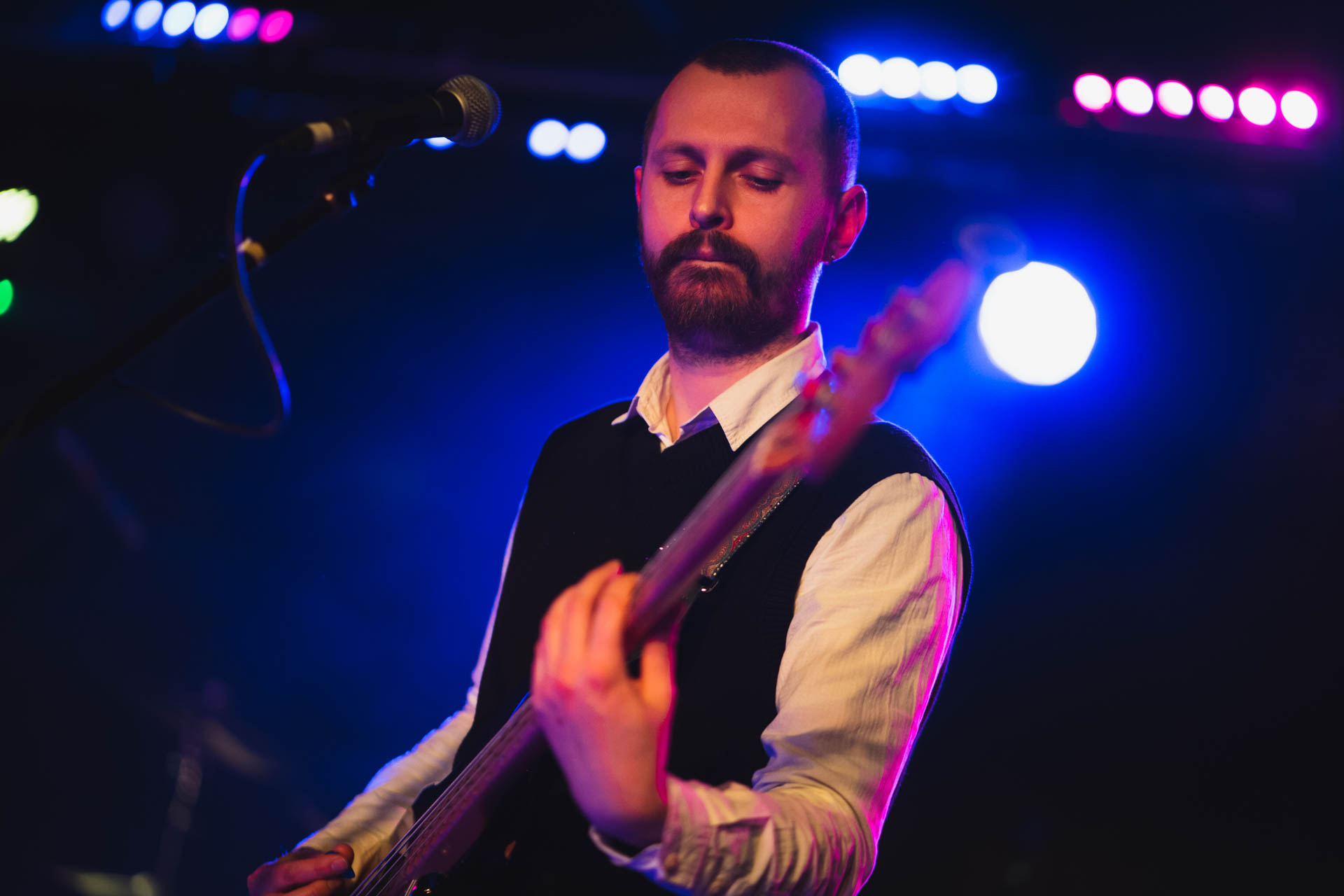
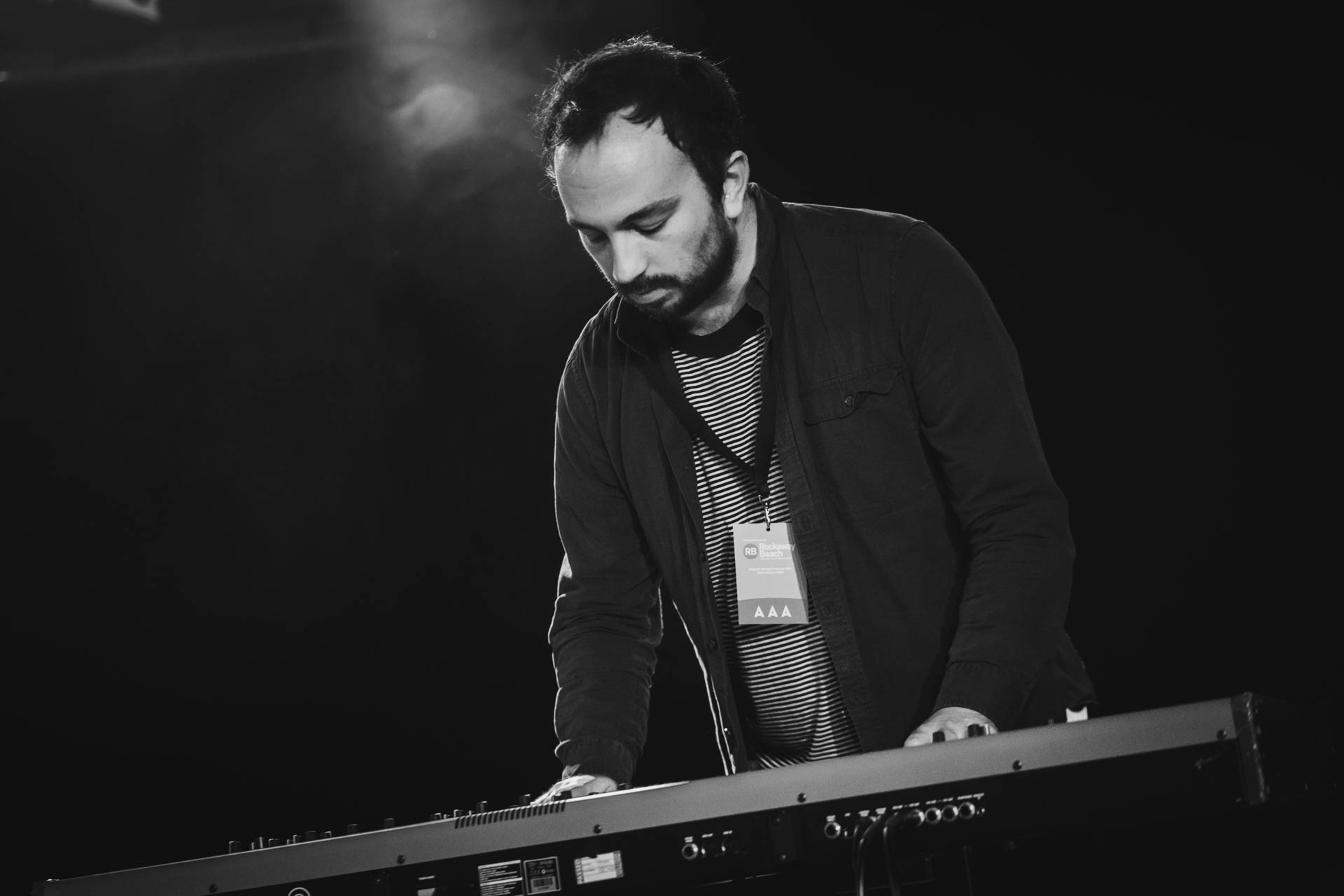
From left to right: Andrew Pearson, Alex Duthie, and John Cashman.

Current members

- Andrew Pearson – guitar (2015–present)
- Stefan Maurice – drums (2015–present)
- Lizzie Reid – bass (2025–present)
- John Cashman – keyboards, synth (2015–present)
- Oliver Brown – guitar, keyboards (2024–present)

Past members

- Barry Carty – drums (2015–2018)
- Ivan Rea – violin (2016–2018)
- Alex Duthie – bass (2015–2024)

== Discography ==
Studio albums

as Hamish James Hawk

- Aznavour (2014)
- Mull (2015)

as Hamish Hawk & the New Outfit

- From Zero to One (2018)

as Hamish Hawk

- Laziest River (2019)
- Heavy Elevator (2021)
- Angel Numbers (2023)
- A Firmer Hand (2024)
- Intriguer/Tenderness (2027)

Extended plays

- Covers (2022)
- Covers II (2025)
