= Ralph Perrazzo =

Italian American chef

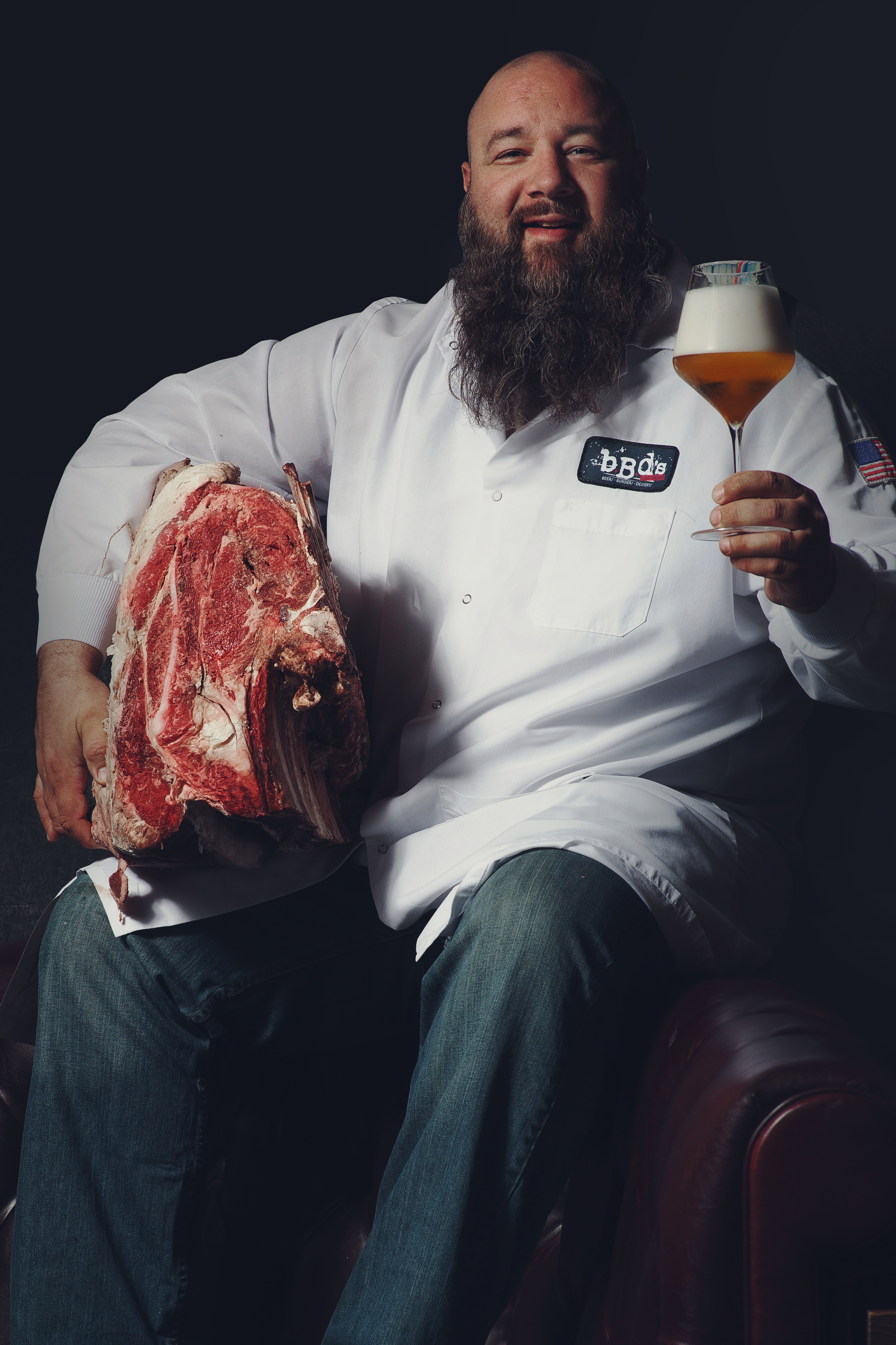
- Chef Ralph Perrazzo, 2019
- Born: Long Island, NY
- Education: The Culinary Institute of America
- Culinary career
- Cooking style: American cuisine
- Current restaurants
- bBd's (Beers, Burgers, Desserts), Snap-O-Razzo Hot Dogs
- Website: www.snaporazzo.com; www.eatbbds.com

Ralph Perrazzo is an Italian American chef.

His restaurant, bBd's (Beers, Burgers, Desserts) was the New York City Wine & Food Festival's 2015 Burger Bash Winner and was included in Newsday's Top Long Island Restaurants in 2014, 2015 and 2016.

He cooked at the Life Is Beautiful Music & Art Festival official kick-off party, Grills & Guitars in 2016 where he was noticed for his pickle fries and steamed burgers. Perrazzo has also been recognized for his ramen.

In 2020, Perrazzo started focusing on his new artisan line of hot dogs and his hot dog company, Snap-O-Razzo Hot Dogs.

== Biography ==
Perrazzo opened his first restaurant, bBd's in Rocky Point on Long Island, New York where it garnered recognition as a neighborhood burger joint with a high quality craft beer selection.

In 2018, he closed bBd's in Rocky Point and opened bBd's in Palace Station hotel and casino in Las Vegas, Nevada, later becoming recognized by Las Vegas Weekly as one of Las Vegas’ Best New Restaurants and “one of the best places to eat in Vegas” by Food & Wine.

As of 2022, Perrazzo moved bBd's to the Las Vegas Strip and began focusing on distributing his Snap-O-Razzo Hot Dogs nationwide and internationally.

Snap-O-Razzo, ever since its establishment, had spread out across the entire United States. Two of Perrazzo’s non-cased Spinner Snaps, Juicy's Beef Wieners and Roasted Jalapeno Wieners, are available in Kroger stores – Smith's Food and Drug, King Soopers, and City Market (US grocery store chain) – in Arizona, Colorado, Idaho, Montana, New Mexico, Nevada, Utah, and Wyoming since January 2023.

== Restaurants and brands ==
- bBd's – Beers Burgers Desserts in Palace Station Casino, Las Vegas, NV
- bBd's – Beers Burgers Desserts in Rocky Point, NY
- Snap-O-Razzo Hot Dogs
- Snap-O-Razzo Hot Dogs Spinner Snaps

== Awards ==
- 2004: Bradley Ogden at Caesars Palace received “Best New Restaurant” award by the James Beard Foundation during Ralph Perrazzo's tenure
- 2005: StarChefs.com Las Vegas Rising Star Pastry Chef
- 2017: The Best Gastropubs on Long Island
- 2018: Best New Las Vegas Restaurants by Thrillist
- 2018: Las Vegas’ Best New Restaurants by Las Vegas Weekly
- 2019: Gold Best Ramen by Best of Las Vegas, Las Vegas Review-Journal
- 2019 :Best of Vegas – Best Eclectic Beer Menu
- 2019: USA Today 5 Best – Best Restaurants in Las Vegas
- 2020: “The 52 Essential Restaurants” in Eating Las Vegas by John Curtas
