= Sex Week =

American indie rock duo

- Origin: Brooklyn, New York
- Genres: Indie rock, shoegaze
- Years active: 2023–present
- Label: Grand Jury Records
- Members: Pearl Amanda Dickson, Richard Orofino
- Website: grandjurymusic.com/artist/sex-week/

Sex Week is an American indie rock duo from Brooklyn, New York consisting of Pearl Amanda Dickson and Richard Orofino. The duo is currently signed to Grand Jury Records.

== History ==
Dickson began her career as an actress, with roles in Yellowjackets and The Girl from Plainville. After moving from Los Angeles, to New York, Dickson met Orofino, where she mentioned to him being a fan of his music Orofino mentioned enjoying a playlist that Dickson had made for her then partner. In 2023, the duo released their first song under the "Sex Week" moniker called "Toad Mode." The duo released their debut self-titled EP in 2024. In 2025, the duo released their second EP titled Upper Mezzanine. Prior to the album's release, the duo released the song "Coat". Dickson and Orofino are currently in a relationship together.

== Discography ==
EPs

- Sex Week (2024, Grand Jury)
- Upper Mezzanine (2025, Grand Jury)
