= Something Good (Catherine Porter album) =

Studio album by Catherine Porter
- Released: September 30, 2002
- Recorded: 2002
- Genres: Pop, acoustic
- Length: 49:00
- Label: Jive
- Producer: Kevin Malpass

Catherine Porter chronology
Live at the Brixton Academy (1994)	Something Good (2002)

Something Good is the debut full-length studio album by the singer songwriter Catherine Porter released in 2002. Recorded at Battery Studios, Westside Studios & Fort Studios, all in London, the album is mostly composed by Catherine with producer Kevin Melpass, though it also includes several cover versions. It was Catherine's only full-length release before leaving Jive Records, unhappy with the direction they were trying to push her in.

Crazy had been Catherine's entry into the 2000 Song for Europe competition in the United Kingdom - which she lost to Nikki French. Talkin' To The Fish is her 9/11 song, and tells the story of a doomed employee in the World Trade Center wishing anything to swap places with the hapless fish in the office tank, just to escape the knowledge of what was about to happen to them.

One single was released from the album - She's So Cool. Neither the single or the album were promoted, and despite strong interest from BBC Radio 2, both failed to chart.

== Track listing ==
- All tracks written by Catherine Porter and Kevin Malpass except where noted
1. "She's So Cool"
2. "At Seventeen" (Janis Ian)
3. "Talkin' to the Fish"
4. "Some of Your Lovin'" (Gerald Goffin/Carole King)
5. "Something Good"
6. "It Ain't Rocket Science"
7. "I've Got You"
8. "Crazy" (Catherine Porter/Tony Moore)
9. "I'll See You When I See You"
10. "Essex Road"
11. "I'm Not Needed Here Now" David Gates/Billy Dean
12. "Winds of Change"

== Personnel ==
- Vocals: Catherine Porter
- Keyboards: James Pearson
- Bass: Norman Watt-Roy
- Drums: Dylan Howe
- Guitars: John Themis
- Cello: Tony Peace
- Oboe: John Anderson
- Saxophone, Flute: Snake Davis
- Trombone: Neil Sidwell
- Strings: Gavin Wright
- Produced by Kevin Malpass
- Recorded and mixed by Simon Smart
