= 2027 in music =

This topic covers events and articles related to 2027 in music.

== Events ==
- Sharon Osbourne has announced that Ozzfest will return this year after a nine-year hiatus, with two shows in Birmingham and two in North America in the works. This will be the first Ozzfest held without her husband Ozzy, who died in 2025.
- Children of Bodom plans to celebrate their 30th anniversary of releasing music, following their reunion shows in February 2026.
