= Smush (band) =

Canadian rock band

smush
- Origin: Vancouver, British Columbia
- Genres: Shoegaze; indie rock; grunge; dream pop
- Years active: 2022–present
- Labels: Elev8music; Zegema Beach; Candlepin
- Members: Emily Borrowman; Atley King; Rudi Neubrander
- Past members: Jay Christie

Smush (stylized in all lowercase) is a Canadian-founded and Brooklyn-based shoegaze band, formed in 2022 in Vancouver, British Columbia, by Emily Borrowman (bass, vocals), Atley King (guitar), and Jay Christie (drums). In 2024, they released their first studio album, if you were here i'd be home now.

== History ==
Before forming Smush, Emily Borrowman and Atley King—who are married—had been casually writing songs together for several years. In 2022, they both began to dive deeper into the shoegaze genre and began writing more intentional songs, with the band being formed informally. They were further inspired after a trip to New York and seeing some of the bands there. King had been in previous bands and has a BA in jazz vibraphone, while Borrowman had previously performed in choirs and theatre.

The band released their first studio album, if you were here i'd be home now, on June 15, 2024. It was originally only available on Bandcamp before the band was able to find a digital distributor, later releasing it on streaming on November 1. Some of the album's tracks originated from the band's first recording sessions from 2022. In the songwriting process, Borrowman took much inspiration from female songwriters, using an honest and reflective style.

On February 20, 2026, Smush released the covers EP, standards. They plan to have their next album be a concept album..

== Influences and musical style ==
The band's music has been described as shoegaze with elements of indie rock, grunge, and dream pop. Smush have stated that they were originally inspired by East Coast bands on a trip to New York, including Feeble Little Horse, Hotline TNT, and Weed. After the release of their debut album, if you were here i'd be home now, the online magazine Idioteq compared the band's style of music to that of My Bloody Valentine, Slow Pulp, Julie, and Slow Crush. In contrast to My Bloody Valentine and other shoegaze bands such as Ride and Slowdive, however, Borrowman's vocals are not buried in the mix and are intelligible, similar to those of Beach House. The band's experimentation with harsh noise, feedback, and distortion was compared to Sonic Youth and their art rock influence..

== Discography ==
=== Studio albums ===
Title	Details
if you were here i'd be home now	Released: June 15, 2024; Label: Zegema Beach/Candlepin; Formats: CD, LP record, digital download

=== Extended plays ===
Title	Details
standards	Released: February 20, 2026; Label: Elev8music; Formats: Digital download, LP record

=== Singles ===
Title	Year	Album
"if we didn't cry"	2024	if you were here i'd be home now
"lizzy mcguire"	2024	if you were here i'd be home now
"41"	2025	standards
"don't know why"	2026	standards
"milkweed butterfly"	2026	i'll always stay
"john dearly"	2026	i'll always wish,,
