= Inferum =

Dutch death metal band

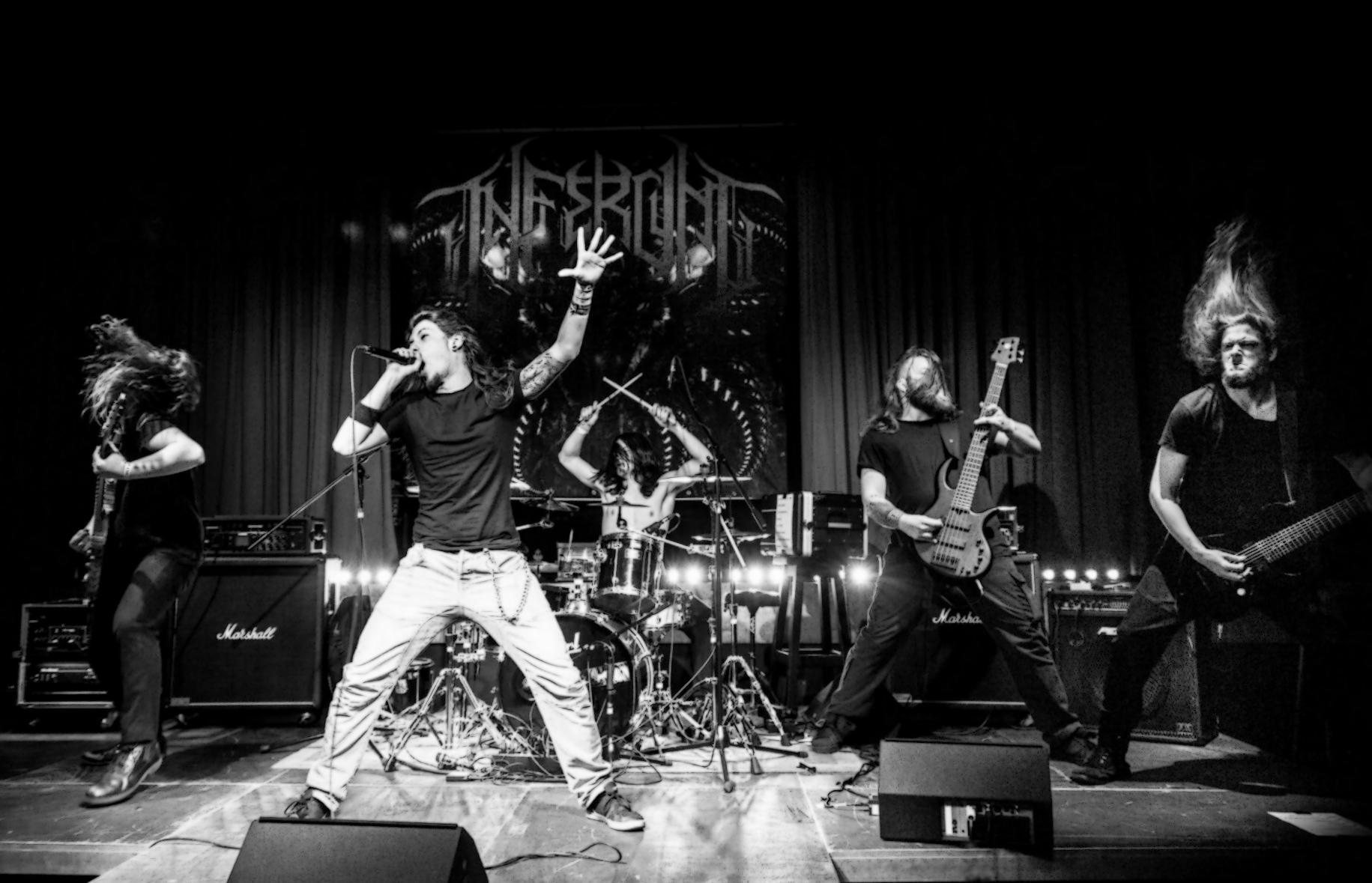
- Inferum in 2017

Background information
- Origin: Eindhoven, Netherlands
- Genres: Death metal; extreme metal; progressive metal
- Years active: 2015–present
- Members: Morrison de Boer; David Luiten; Remco Schouten; Ozzy Voskuilen; Wouter Macare
- Past members: Lars Deelman; Stan Albers

Inferum is a Dutch death metal band from Eindhoven, formed in 2015.

== Biography ==
Inferum was founded in 2015 by vocalist Morrison de Boer and lead guitarist Lars Deelman. They both studied at the Metal Factory in Eindhoven.

In 2017 Inferum represented the Netherlands in the W:O:A Metal Battle (also known as Wacken Metal Battle): a worldwide metal music competition by Wacken Open Air. The band went on to win third prize, giving their country the highest ranking it had achieved in the W:O:A Metal Battle so far. In the same year Inferum released their first EP: Modern Massacre. The band also appeared on Dutch festivals Baroeg Open Air, Occultfest, and Stonehenge Festival.

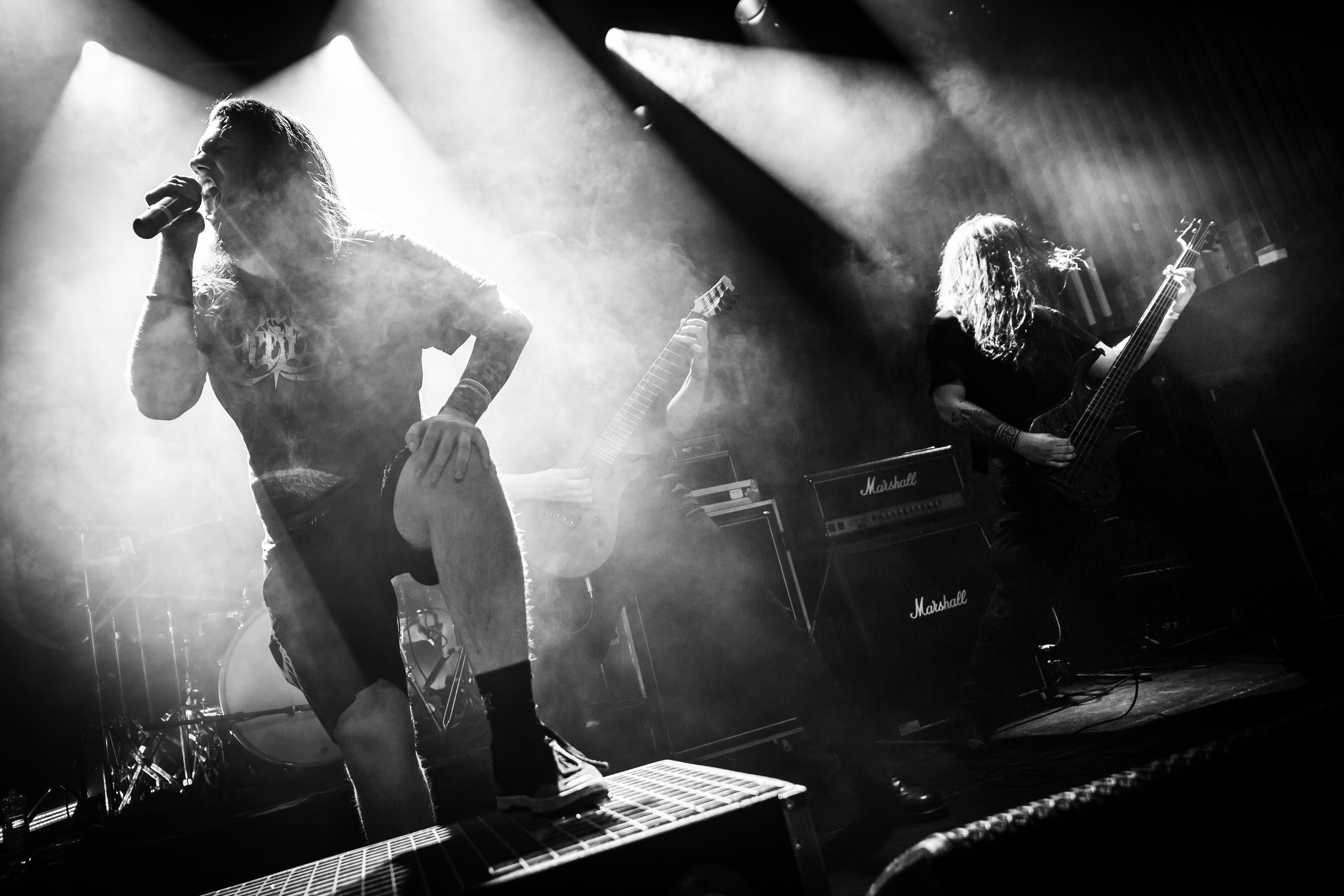
Inferum at Complexity Fest, 2019

== Band members ==
=== Current members ===
- Morrison de Boer – vocals
- David Luiten – guitar
- Remco Schouten – guitar
- Ozzy Voskuilen – bass guitar (formerly rhythm guitar)
- Wouter Macare – drums

=== Former members ===
- Lars Deelman – lead guitar
- Stan Albers – bass guitar

== Discography ==
=== Albums ===
- Human Disposal (2019)

=== EP's ===
- Modern Massacre (2017)

=== Singles ===
- Autophagia with guest vocals by CJ McMahon from Thy Art Is Murder (2018)
- Beyond Reach (2019)
