= Intriguer/Tenderness =

2027 studio album by Hamish Hawk

Studio album by Hamish Hawk
- Released: 2 April 2027
- Label: So

Hamish Hawk chronology
A Firmer Hand (2024)	Intriguer/Tenderness (2027)

Singles from Intriguer/Tenderness
- 1. "Intriguer/Tenderness" Released: 28 September 2026; 2. "Ice-like Empty" Released: 28 September 2026

Intriguer/Tenderness is the upcoming fourth studio album by Scottish musician Hamish Hawk. It is set to be released on 2 April 2027, through the imprint So Recordings. The album is being promoted by the singles "Intriguer/Tenderness" and "Ice-like Empty", which were released on 28 September 2026.

== Track listing ==
All lyrics are written by Hamish Hawk.

Intriguer/Tenderness track listing
No.	Title	Length
1.	"Isn't"
2.	"Intriguer/Tenderness"	4:01
3.	"Ice-like Empty"	3:25
4.	"Ego in Lotus"
5.	"Half of Paris"
6.	"Thirsty Girl"
7.	"Mother of Vinegar"
8.	"Oyster"
9.	"The Tuscan Kind"
10.	"Ashes, and Then Some"

Limited Edition Dinked LP – bonus 7" vinyl.
No.	Title	Length
11.	"Pain That"
12.	"L.Coward"
