= Steve Lamacq =

English DJ (born 1964)

Steve Lamacq MBE
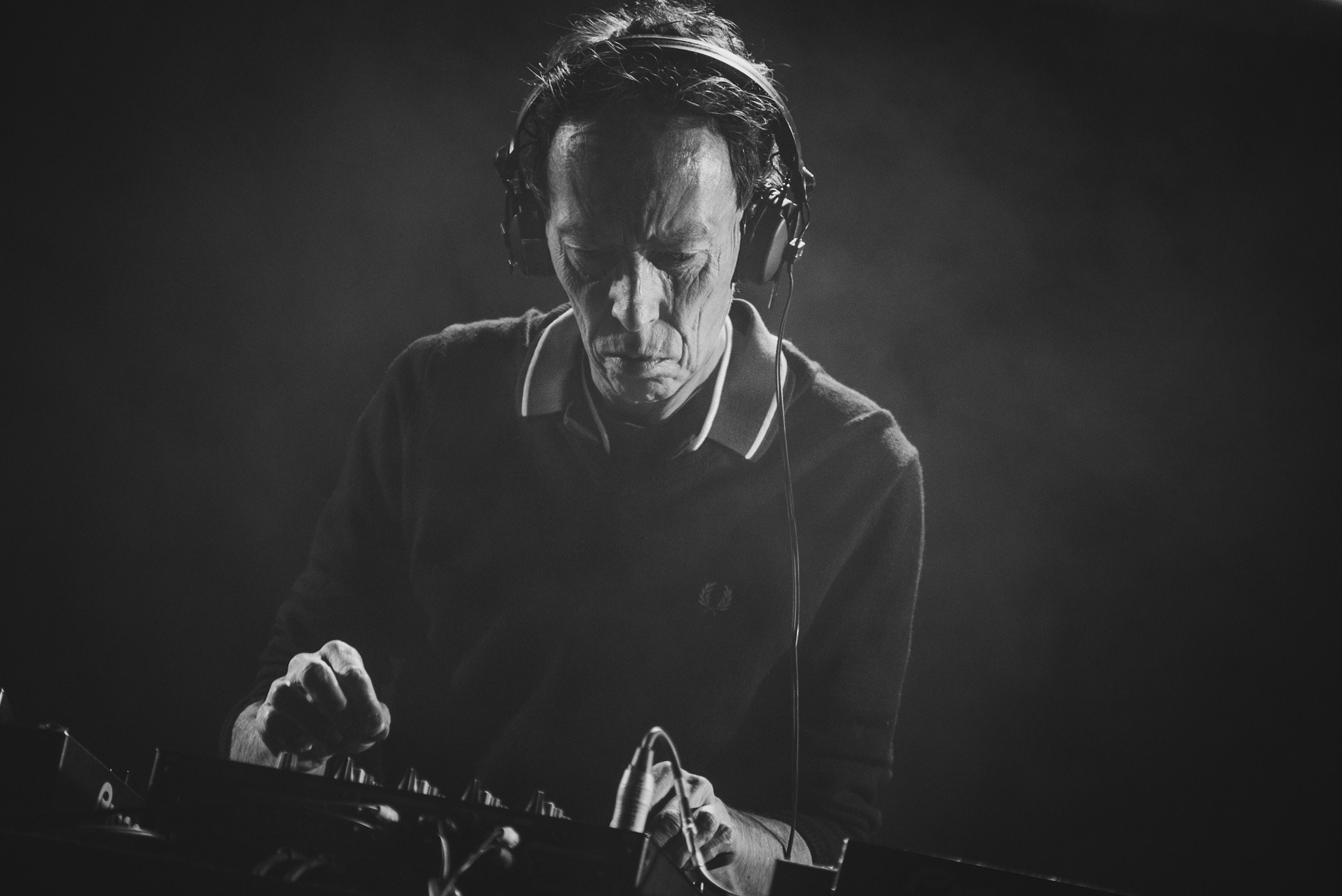
- Lamacq at Rockaway Beach in 2018
- Born: Stephen Paul Lamacq; 16 October 1964 (age 61); Bournemouth, England
- Spouse: Jen Willis (m. 2019)
- Children: 1
- Presenting career
- Show: Steve Lamacq
- Station: BBC Radio 6 Music
- Time slot: 16:00 – 19:00 Mondays
- Style: Disc Jockey
- Country: United Kingdom
- Previous shows: The Evening Session; In New Music We Trust, BBC Radio 1 Steve Lamacq's Rock College, BBC Radio 2

Stephen Paul Lamacq (born 16 October 1964), sometimes known by his nickname Lammo (given to him by John Peel), is an English disc jockey, currently working with BBC Radio 6 Music.

Lamacq was appointed Member of the Order of the British Empire (MBE) in the 2025 New Year Honours for services to broadcasting and to music venues.

== Early life ==
Lamacq was born in Bournemouth, and first lived in Ferndown. He and his family later moved to the Essex village Colne Engaine and, from 1976, attended The Ramsey Academy, which had been formed the previous year from two grammar schools.

== Early career ==
Lamacq cites Orchestral Manoeuvres in the Dark's "wonderful" 1979 single "Electricity" as his inspiration to become a disc jockey, noting that he wanted to afford air time to similar, "curious" music. Prior to launching this career, he studied journalism at Harlow College, Essex, and worked as a junior reporter at the West Essex Gazette. In similar fashion to other music journalists who started fanzines during their teenage years, Lamacq started one called A Pack of Lies.

During his time at NME he began DJing on the pirate radio station Q102, which would become XFM. He formed a record label in 1992 with Alan James and Tony Smith, called Deceptive Records. The majority of the label's releases shared a punk-pop sensibility, with Elastica being their most successful signing, before the label eventually folded in 2001.

Between 1995 and 1997, Lamacq occasionally presented Top of the Pops on BBC One with fellow Radio 1 DJ Jo Whiley.

In a 1996 Peel session by Mogwai, the fourth item on the track listing is '"Mogwai Salute The Brilliance Of Steve Lamacq".

Lamacq is a fan of Colchester United. He visited their training ground for his 50th birthday where he trained as a goalkeeper, has written an autobiography, entitled Going Deaf for a Living and has also acted as a compere on the main stage at the Reading Festival on several occasions.

== BBC Radio ==
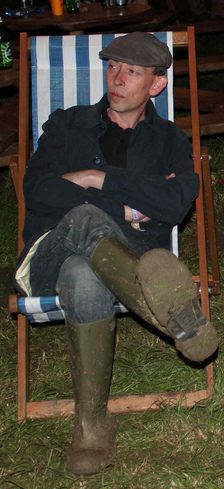
Lamacq backstage at the Glastonbury Festival's BBC Introducing Stage in 2011

In the early 1990s, Lamacq appeared regularly on the Gary Crowley show, a three-hour Sunday afternoon indie music programme on the BBC station GLR. Lamacq contributed the Gig Guide and the NME Indie Top 20.

=== Radio 1 ===
Between 1993 and 1997 Lamacq presented The Evening Session with Jo Whiley, and then on his own until December 2002, when the programme was cancelled. Colin Murray served as a temporary replacement for six months until Zane Lowe's contract with the London station XFM ended in June 2003, where he took up a permanent position. On 28 September 2007, both he and Whiley reunited to recreate The Evening Session on the latter's show as part of Radio 1's 40th Anniversary celebrations.

He also presented the indie radio show Lamacq Live every Monday evening, beginning in July 1998 and ending on 18 September 2006. The show ended as part of a makeover in Radio 1's schedule to present a "younger image" to Radio One listeners, with Colin Murray taking over his slot.

Lamacq has also presented documentaries for the station, as well as hosting their John Peel Night special. He presented the In New Music We Trust programme every Monday night from 9 to 10 pm until August 2009, when it was announced he would be leaving Radio 1 as part of a shakeup in the scheduling.

=== 6 Music ===
Lamacq's homepage on the 6 Music website described Lamacq Live as "the UK's most influential indie radio show". He also has a programme on the BBC's digital station, BBC Radio 6 Music, which was on Sunday afternoons, but from April 2005 he presented the daily teatime show on BBC Radio 6 Music, taking over from Andrew Collins.

In March 2010 it was announced that Lamacq and fellow Radio 1 presenter Jo Whiley would present a one-off Evening Session (the first in 13 years) on Good Friday (2 April) for BBC Radio 6 Music.

In 2016, Lamacq broadcast from the studios at BBC Radio Humberside, as part of Radio 6 Music's Independent Venue Week tour. One night of the nationwide tour was hosted at The New Adelphi Club in Hull, East Yorkshire, on 26 January 2016, with Mark Morriss as the headline act.

On 1 September 2023, it was announced that Lamacq would stand down from his weekday drive time show and present a single weekly show on Monday called Steve Lamacq’s Teatime Session from January 2024.

=== Radio 2 and other appearances ===
In addition to his regular 6 Music slot, he also presented a weekly show on BBC Radio 2 where he played his own choice of music and introduces his listeners to both new and emerging artists.

Beginning in April 2007, the show was originally broadcast on Wednesdays between 11:30 pm and 12:30 am and, from April 2008, between 11 pm and 12 am. At Easter 2010, as part of wider changes to the Radio 2 evening schedule, Trevor Nelson took over the Wednesday 11 pm slot (having previously been on in the hour before Lamacq), with Lamacq moving to 11 pm on Saturday nights. In April 2012, the show was renamed Steve Lamacq's Rock College and moved to a Thursday 11 pm slot. Lamacq left regular presenting duties on Radio 2 in September 2013 as part of a reshuffle of evening presenters.

In 2007, he deputised for Bob Harris on Saturdays from 11 pm to 2 am, who had to receive treatment for cancer.

He has also appeared as a guest on 5live sport punditry show Fighting Talk hosted by Colin Murray.

== Weekenders mix album ==
Weekenders is a DJ mix album mixed by Steve Lamacq and released by London Records in 1996. It has a dance and indie-alternative rock feel rolled into one with Britpop tracks such as Pulp's "Common People" and Blur's "Girls & Boys" alongside tracks by electronica artists such as The Chemical Brothers, Prodigy and Orbital.
