= Something Good (Claire Rousay and Zander Raymond album) =

Studio album by Claire Rousay and Zander Raymond
- Released: January 29, 2027
- Genres: Experimental pop; free improvisation
- Label: Thrill Jockey

Claire Rousay chronology
On Holding (2026)	Something Good (2027)

Zander Raymond chronology
No One Notices the Fly (2025)	Something Good (2027)

Something Good is an upcoming collaborative studio album by experimental musicians Claire Rousay and Zander Raymond. It is scheduled to be released on January 29, 2027, via Thrill Jockey.

== Production ==
Something Good was promoted as "an open-ended exchange" between Los Angeles and Chicago, the residences of Rousay and Raymond, respectively.

The production of "Can't We Have Both" was new to Rousay, which inspired her to create the rest of Something Good. Raymond stated that the album "was made far more spontaneously" and described the production as "more just playing."

== Composition ==
=== Overview ===
Something Good merges experimental pop from Rousay and free improvisation from Raymond, featuring piano, synthesizer, electric guitar, and pipe organs. The album's track primarily revolve around various trends and pop culture references, and how an artist can find their place amid it all.

=== Tracks ===
"Can't We Have Both", one of two tracks on Something Good that includes vocals, features Rousay singing about Yung Lean, the fading influence of india pale ales, and a resurgence of DVDs. Rousay opens the track with the lyrics, "Feeling washed up in the used CD store" and "My industry evaporates and it doesn't need me anymore", on top of a faint distortion, a sparse piano, and a wave of sounds akin to sound collage. It was described by Robin Murray of Clash as "extra-dimensional" and having "a surreal sense of humour."

== Release and promotion ==
In mid-October 2026, Something Good was quietly announced by Thrill Jockey, alongside an advance copy of the lead single, "Can't We Have Both". The following week on October 20, the album and the single were officially announced and released, respectively.

== Track listing ==
No.	Title	Length
1.	"Driving"
2.	"Free Monday"
3.	"Can't We Have Both"
4.	"Blue Shirt Always"
5.	"Somewhat Habitable"
6.	"Colors and Feelings"
7.	"Boat Rack"
8.	"Some Good News"
9.	"Major Freedom"
