= ViVii =

Swedish indie pop band

ViVii is a Swedish indie-pop trio, self-described as a "music project based in Stockholm". ViVii is composed of married couple Emil and Caroline Jonsson, alongside Anders Eckborn. “Siv (You and I),” their debut single, is accompanied by a video made through home recordings and disposable cameras. On March 15, 2019, the band released their debut eponymous album. The album has been characterized as "fluttering ethereal indie-pop," and "reminiscent of Belle and Sebastian in its penchant for fairytale-esque storytelling and Lykke Li in its superb use of vocal harmonies."
