= Edoardo Tresoldi =

Italian sculptor

Edoardo Tresoldi is an Italian sculptor. He makes near-transparent sculptures using wire mesh, and often positions them in public places.
