= Mia Joy =

American indie rock musician

Mia Joy Rocha, better known by her stage name Mia Joy, is an American indie rock musician from Oak Park, Illinois.

== Career ==
Growing up, Rocha sang with the Chicago Children's Choir. Rocha began her musical career in 2016, when she formed a band to perform songs under the moniker Mia Joy with. The following year Rocha and the bandmates she gathered released an EP titled Gemini Moon. After releasing the EP, Rocha went on to release a handful of solo standalone singles in the years proceeding that EP. In January 2021, the record label Fire Talk announced they had signed Rocha, alongside the release of a new song titled Haha. Rocha released her debut full-length album on May 7, 2021 through Fire Talk titled Spirit Tamer.
