= Akash =

Akash may refer to:

- Akash (Jainism)
- Akash (missile)
- Akash, Hama, a Syrian village
- Cyclone Akash, 2007
- Akash, a character in the 2001 Indian film Dil Chahta Hai
- Akash, a character in the 2006 Indian film Gangster
- Akash Sarraf, a character in the 2018 Indian film Andhadhun
- Akasha, Sanskrit term for sky

== People ==
=== Given name ===
==== Sportspeople ====
- Akash Antil, track and field athlete
- Akash Bhandari, cricketer
- Akash Chikte, field hockey player
- Akash Choolun, footballer
- Akash Choudhary, cricketer
- Akash Deep, cricketer
- Akash Lal, cricketer
- Akash Malhotra, cricketer
- Akash Madhwal, cricketer
- Akash Mishra, footballer
- Akash Modi, gymnast
- Akash Parkar, cricketer
- Akash S. Madhavan, para-athlete
- Akash Senaratne, cricketer
- Akash Sharma, cricketer
- Akash Singh (cricketer, born 2002)
- Akash Singh (cricketer, born 1995)
- Akash Sudan, cricketer
- Akash Vasisht, cricketer
- Akash Verma, cricketer
- Akash Yadav, cricketer

==== Others ====
- Akassh, composer
- Akash Banerjee, YouTuber
- Akash Chaurasia, agriculturalist
- Akash Dasnayak, actor and politician
- Akash Pandurang Fundkar, politician
- Akash Kapur, journalist
- Akash Khurana, actor
- Akash Manoj, cardiologist
- Akash Thosar, actor
- Akash Vijayvargiya, politician
- Akash Vukoti, internet personality

=== Surname ===
- Abu Akash, al-Qaeda operative
- Ahmad Akash, footballer
- Annabathula Akash, cricketer
- Aravind Akash, actor
- GMB Akash, photographer
- Jai Akash, actor
- Megha Akash, actress
- Uttam Akash, director

== See also ==
- Akasha (disambiguation)
- Aakash (disambiguation)
- Akashi (disambiguation)
