= Antil =

Antil may refer to:

- Agência Noticiosa de Timor-Leste

== People ==
- Sumit Antil, Indian paralympian and javelin thrower
- Seema Antil alias Seema Punia, Indian discus thrower
- Mandeep Antil, Indian field hockey player
- Tarsem Antil, Indian producer director
- Akash Antil, Indian track and field athlete
