= Coccinia pwaniensis =

Scientific classification
- Kingdom: Plantae
- Clade: Tracheophytes
- Clade: Angiosperms
- Clade: Eudicots
- Clade: Rosids
- Order: Cucurbitales
- Family: Cucurbitaceae
- Genus: Coccinia
- Species: C. pwaniensis

Binomial name
- Coccinia pwaniensis Holstein

Species of flowering plant

Coccinia pwaniensis is an East African species of Coccinia that was first described in 2010.

== Description ==
Perennial, dioecious climber. Shoot length up to 3 m. Young shoots are glabrous and green and later make a grey to reddish-grey bark. Leaves are alternate with 0.6 to 4.1 cm long petiole, lamina 2–10 × 2.7–11.4 cm, shallowly to profoundly 3-lobate (rarely 5-lobate). Upper lamina glabrous with clear to whitish pustules. Lower lamina and petiole with sparse hairs that appear wart-like when broken off. Tendrils simple. Probracts 2–3 mm long.

Flowers in male plants in long many-flowered racemes, in female plants solitary. Calyx with 5 very acute ("subulate"), 2.5–3.5 mm long lobes. Corolla 1.7–2.6 cm long, pale yellowish-orange. Stamens in male flowers 3, combined to a single column. Anthers sinuate, in a globose head. Fruits short cylindrical, 6.2–8.0 cm long and 1.8–2.3 cm in diameter. Seeds 6.5–7.0 × 4.0–4.5 × ca. 1.5 mm (L/W/H), symmetrically obovate, face lenticular.

== Distribution ==
Coccinia pwaniensis occurs along the margins of northern East African coastal forests in SE Kenya, E and NE Tanzania.

== Etymology ==
The epithet is derived from the Swahili word for "coast", referring to the distribution of the species.

== Hybridization ==
The species is known to produce sterile hybrids with Coccinia grandis in the wild.
