= Akashi =

Akashi may refer to:

== People ==
- Akashi (surname)

== Places ==
- Akashi, Hyōgo
- Akashi Station, a Japanese railroad station on the Sanyō Main Line
- Akashi Strait
- Akashi Kaikyō Bridge, crossing the former
- Akashi Castle
- Akashi Domain
- Akashi, the name given to Hagåtña, Guam during the Japanese occupation of Guam (1941-1944)

== Vessels ==
- Japanese cruiser Akashi
- Japanese repair ship Akashi

== Music ==
- "Akashi", a song by Zone (band) from Japan

== Film ==
- Akashi (film), a 2025 Canadian drama film directed by Mayumi Yoshida

== See also ==
- Akash (disambiguation)
