= Akasha (disambiguation) =

Akasha is a Sanskrit word referring to the Vedic concept of the aether or space.

Akasha, Akasa, Akash, Aakash or Akaash may also refer to:

== Arts and entertainment ==
=== Fictional characters ===
- Akasha (comics), a character in the Marvel Universe
- Akasha (The Vampire Chronicles), a character in Anne Rice's novels (and screen adaptions)

=== Film ===
- Aakash (film), a 2005 Indian Kannada language action drama film
- Akasha (2018 film), a 2018 Sudanese comedy film

== Music ==
- Akasha (album), a 1995 album by Bill Laswell
- Akasha (band), a UK-based electronic music duo
- Akasa (band), a London-based pop band
- Akasha (singer), a Mexican hip hop performer

== Religion ==
- Akasha, Aether in Hindu cosmology
- Ākāśa (Jainism), space in Jain cosmology
- Akash Bhairav, a Hindu deity, particularly worshipped in Nepal

== Technology ==
- Akash (missile), an Indian medium-range mobile surface-to-air missile defense system
- Aakash (tablet), an Android-based tablet computer
- SS Akasha, a British steamship

== People ==
- Akasha Lawrence-Spence, American politician
- Akasa Singh, singer and performer

== Weather ==
- Cyclone Akash, the first named tropical cyclone of the 2007 North Indian Ocean cyclone season

== See also ==
- Akashic Books, a Brooklyn-based independent publisher
- Akashic records (disambiguation)
- Akasa (disambiguation)
- Akash (disambiguation)
- Aakash (disambiguation)
- Akasaka (disambiguation)
