= Aakash =

Aakash may refer to:

- Aakash (tablet)
- Aakash (film)

== People with the given name ==
- Aakash Chopra, cricket commentator, YouTuber and former cricketer
- Aakash Choudhary, cricketer
- Aakash Dabhade, actor
- Aakash Gandhi, composer, pianist, songwriter, and entrepreneur
- Aakash Talwar, television actor

== See also ==
- Akash (disambiguation)
- Akasha (disambiguation)
