= Akash Singh =

Akash Singh can refer to:

- Akash Singh (actor), Indian actor
- Akash Singh (cricketer, born 1995), Indian cricketer
- Akash Singh (cricketer, born 2002), Indian cricketer
- Akaash Singh, American stand-up comedian, actor, and podcaster
