= Akashi (surname) =

Akashi (written: 明石) is a Japanese surname. Notable people with the surname include:

- Kaijin Akashi (明石 海人, 1901–1939), Japanese poet
- Akashi Kakuichi (明石 覚一, 1299–1371), Japanese Buddhist monk
- Ken Akashi (明石 顕, born 1976), Japanese race walker
- Kenji Akashi (明石 健志, born 1986) Japanese baseball player
- Masao Akashi (明石 昌夫, 1957–2025), Japanese musical arranger
- Momoka Akashi (明石 百夏, born 1981), Japanese musician
- Akashi Morishige (明石 全登, 1566–1618?), Japanese samurai
- Akashi Motojiro (明石 元二郎, 1864–1919), Japanese general and Governor General of Taiwan
- Akashi Shiganosuke (明石 志賀之助, c. 1600–c. 1649), Japanese sumo wrestler
- Yasushi Akashi (明石 康, born 1931), Japanese diplomat

Fictional characters:

- Akashi Kaoru, character in Psychic Squad
- Akashi, character in the film Ra.One
- Akashi Seijūrō, character in Kuroko's Basketball
- Akashi Yuuna, character in Negima! Magister Negi Magi
- Akaashi Keiji, character in Haikyu!!
- Akashi Takeomi, character in Tokyo Revengers
