= MTV Video Music Award for Best Direction =

Annual music video award

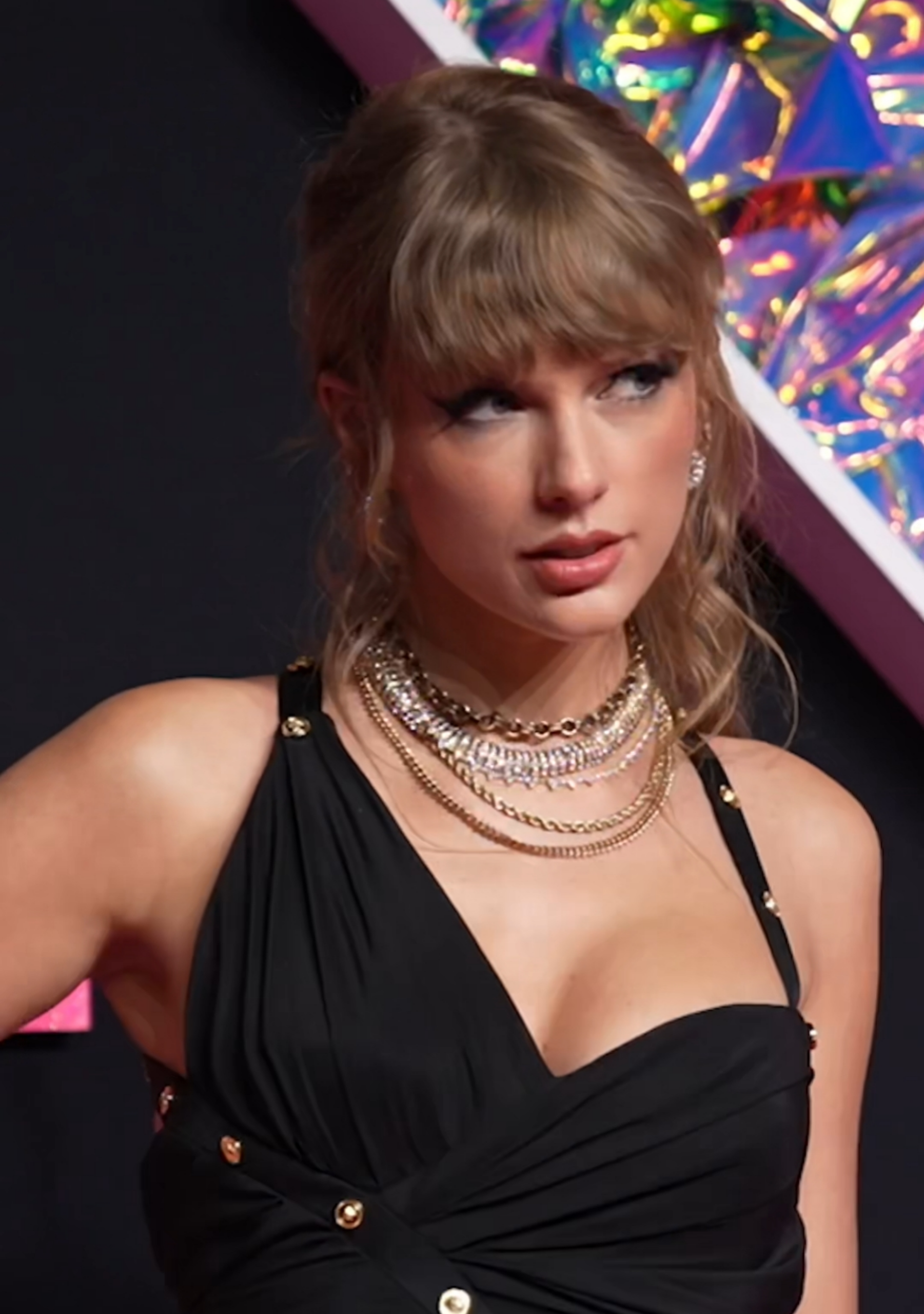
- "Opalite", directed by Taylor Swift, is the most recent recipient
- Awarded for: Direction
- Country: United States
- Presented by: MTV
- First award: 1984
- Currently held by: Taylor Swift – "Opalite" by Taylor Swift (2026)

Highlights
- Most wins: Taylor Swift (5)
- Most nominations: Eminem (8); David Fincher & Dave Meyers (8); Taylor Swift (8)
- Website: VMA website

The MTV Video Music Award for Best Direction is an award given to the artist, the artist's manager, and the director of the music video. From 1984 to 2006, the full name of the award was Best Direction in a Video, and in 2007, it was briefly renamed Best Director. The category acquired its current name with the 2008 awards.

The director with the most wins is Taylor Swift with five. The most nominated directors are David Fincher, Dave Meyers, and Swift with eight nominations. Remarkably, seven of Fincher's nominations were achieved in a three-year span (1989–1991), as he was nominated a record three times in both 1989 and 1990. Fincher's recent nomination (and win) occurred over twenty years later in 2013 for his work on Justin Timberlake's "Suit & Tie." Closely following them is Francis Lawrence with six nominations. Hype Williams is the director with the most nominations and no wins at five.

The performer whose videos have won the most awards is Swift with five. The most nominated performers are Eminem and Swift with eight nominations. Swift is also the only performer to have won five moonmen in this category for her work directing.

Six other performers have won a moonman in this category for their work directing/co-directing their videos: George Michael, Beck, Erykah Badu, Adam Yauch of the Beastie Boys, Kendrick Lamar, and Lil Nas X. An additional nine performers have been nominated for their work co-directing/directing videos: Busta Rhymes, Missy Elliott, Christina Aguilera, Jared Leto (as Bartholomew Cubbins), Ryan Lewis, Bruno Mars, Billie Eilish, Tyler, the Creator (as Wolf Haley), and Travis Scott.

== Recipients ==
=== 1980s ===
Year	Winner(s)	Work	Nominees	Ref.
1984	Tim Newman	"Sharp Dressed Man" (performed by ZZ Top)	"All of the Good Ones Are Taken" – Martin Kahan (performed by Ian Hunter); "Dancing with Myself" – Tobe Hooper (performed by Billy Idol); "Every Breath You Take" – Godley & Creme (performed by The Police); "Gimme All Your Lovin'" – Tim Newman (performed by ZZ Top); "I Want a New Drug" – David Rathod (performed by Huey Lewis and the News); "Numbers with Wings" – Juliano Waldman (performed by The Bongos); "Time After Time" – Edd Griles (performed by Cyndi Lauper)	
1985	Jean-Baptiste Mondino	"The Boys of Summer" (performed by Don Henley)	"Dancin'" – Mary Lambert (performed by Chris Isaak); "Don't Come Around Here No More" – Jeff Stein (performed by Tom Petty and the Heartbreakers); "Don't You (Forget About Me)" – Daniel Kleinman (performed by Simple Minds); "Run to You" – Steven Barron (performed by Bryan Adams); "Stranger in Town" – Steven Barron (performed by Toto); "The Wild Boys" – Russell Mulcahy (performed by Duran Duran)	
1986	Steven Barron	"Take On Me" (performed by a-ha)	"Burning House of Love" – Daniel Kleinman (performed by X); "Money for Nothing" – Steven Barron (performed by Dire Straits); "Rough Boy" – Steven Barron (performed by ZZ Top); "Sex as a Weapon" – Daniel Kleinman (performed by Pat Benatar)	
1987	Stephen R. Johnson	"Sledgehammer" (performed by Peter Gabriel)	"Don't Dream It's Over" – Alex Proyas (performed by Crowded House); "Higher Love" – Peter Kagan and Paula Greif (performed by Steve Winwood); "Land of Confusion" – Jim Yukich and John Lloyd (performed by Genesis); "With or Without You" – Meiert Avis (performed by U2)	
1988	Andy Morahan and George Michael	"Father Figure" (performed by George Michael)	"Dear God" – Nicholas Brandt (performed by XTC); "Learning to Fly" – Storm Thorgerson (performed by Pink Floyd); "The One I Love" – Robert Longo (performed by R.E.M.); "You Have Placed a Chill in My Heart" – Sophie Muller (performed by Eurythmics)	
1989	David Fincher	"Express Yourself" (performed by Madonna)	"Finish What Ya Started" – Andy Morahan (performed by Van Halen); "Parents Just Don't Understand" – Scott Kalvert (performed by DJ Jazzy Jeff & The Fresh Prince); "Real Love" – David Fincher (performed by Jody Watley); "Roll with It" – David Fincher (performed by Steve Winwood)	

=== 1990s ===
Year	Winner(s)	Work	Nominees	Ref.
1990	David Fincher	"Vogue" (performed by Madonna)	"The End of the Innocence" – David Fincher (performed by Don Henley); "Janie's Got a Gun" – David Fincher (performed by Aerosmith); "Opposites Attract" – Michael Patterson and Candace Reckinger (performed by Paula Abdul)	
1991	Tarsem	"Losing My Religion" (performed by R.E.M.)	"Freedom! '90" – David Fincher (performed by George Michael); "Silent Lucidity" – Matt Mahurin (performed by Queensrÿche); "Wicked Game (Concept)" – Herb Ritts (performed by Chris Isaak)	
1992	Mark Fenske	"Right Now" (performed by Van Halen)	"Baby Got Back" – Adam Bernstein (performed by Sir Mix-a-Lot); "Give It Away" – Stéphane Sednaoui (performed by Red Hot Chili Peppers); "My Lovin' (You're Never Gonna Get It)" – Matthew Rolston (performed by En Vogue)	
1993	Mark Pellington	"Jeremy" (performed by Pearl Jam)	"Free Your Mind" – Mark Romanek (performed by En Vogue); "Kiko and the Lavender Moon" – Ondrej Rudavsky (performed by Los Lobos); "Man on the Moon" – Peter Care (performed by R.E.M.)	
1994	Jake Scott	"Everybody Hurts" (performed by R.E.M.)	"Amazing" – Marty Callner (performed by Aerosmith); "Sabotage" – Spike Jonze (performed by Beastie Boys); "Sweet Lullaby" – Tarsem (performed by Deep Forest)	
1995	Spike Jonze	"Buddy Holly" (performed by Weezer)	"Basket Case" – Mark Kohr (performed by Green Day); "Scream" – Mark Romanek (performed by Michael Jackson and Janet Jackson); "Waterfalls" – F. Gary Gray (performed by TLC)	
1996	Jonathan Dayton and Valerie Faris	"Tonight, Tonight" (performed by The Smashing Pumpkins)	"Big Me" – Jesse Peretz (performed by Foo Fighters); "Ironic" – Stéphane Sednaoui (performed by Alanis Morissette); "It's Oh So Quiet" – Spike Jonze (performed by Björk)	
1997	Beck	"The New Pollution" (performed by Beck)	"The End Is the Beginning Is the End" – Joel Schumacher, Jonathan Dayton and Valerie Faris (performed by The Smashing Pumpkins); "The Perfect Drug" – Mark Romanek (performed by Nine Inch Nails); "The Rain (Supa Dupa Fly)" – Hype Williams (performed by Missy Elliott); "Virtual Insanity" – Jonathan Glazer (performed by Jamiroquai)	
1998	Jonas Åkerlund	"Ray of Light" (performed by Madonna)	"Gone Till November" – Francis Lawrence (performed by Wyclef Jean featuring Refugee Allstars); "Karma Police" – Jonathan Glazer (performed by Radiohead); "Push It" – Andrea Giacobbe (performed by Garbage); "Smack My Bitch Up" – Jonas Åkerlund (performed by The Prodigy)	
1999	Torrance Community Dance Group	"Praise You" (performed by Fatboy Slim)	"Freak on a Leash" – Todd McFarlane, Graham Morris, Jonathan Dayton and Valerie Faris (performed by Korn); "My Name Is" – Dr. Dre and Phillip Atwell (performed by Eminem); "No Scrubs" – Hype Williams (performed by TLC); "What's It Gonna Be?!" – Hype Williams and Busta Rhymes (performed by Busta Rhymes featuring Janet Jackson)	

=== 2000s ===
Year	Winner(s)	Work	Nominees	Ref.
2000	Jonathan Dayton and Valerie Faris	"Californication" (performed by Red Hot Chili Peppers)	"Everything is Everything" – Sanji (performed by Lauryn Hill); "Learn to Fly" – Jesse Peretz (performed by Foo Fighters); "The Real Slim Shady" – Dr. Dre and Phillip Atwell (performed by Eminem); "Untitled (How Does It Feel)" – Paul Hunter and Dominique Trenier (performed by D'Angelo)	
2001	Spike Jonze	"Weapon of Choice" (performed by Fatboy Slim)	"Imitation of Life" – Garth Jennings (performed by R.E.M.); "Crawling" – Brothers Strause (performed by Linkin Park); "Ms. Jackson" – F. Gary Gray (performed by OutKast); "Stan" – Dr. Dre and Phillip Atwell (performed by Eminem featuring Dido)	
2002	Joseph Kahn	"Without Me" (performed by Eminem)	"Alive" – Francis Lawrence (performed by P.O.D.); "By the Way" – Jonathan Dayton and Valerie Faris (performed by Red Hot Chili Peppers); "One Minute Man" – Dave Meyers (performed by Missy Elliott featuring Ludacris and Trina); "This Train Don't Stop There Anymore" – David LaChapelle (performed by Elton John)	
2003	Jamie Thraves	"The Scientist" (performed by Coldplay)	"Cry Me a River" – Francis Lawrence (performed by Justin Timberlake); "The Hell Song" – Marc Klasfeld (performed by Sum 41); "Hurt" – Mark Romanek (performed by Johnny Cash); "Work It" – Dave Meyers and Missy Elliott (performed by Missy Elliott)	
2004	Mark Romanek	"99 Problems" (performed by Jay-Z)	"The Hardest Button to Button" – Michel Gondry (performed by The White Stripes); "Hey Ya!" – Bryan Barber (performed by OutKast); "It's My Life" – David LaChapelle (performed by No Doubt); "Walkie Talkie Man" – Michel Gondry (performed by Steriogram)	
2005	Samuel Bayer	"Boulevard of Broken Dreams" (performed by Green Day)	"Blue Orchid" – Floria Sigismondi (performed by The White Stripes); "Get Right" – Francis Lawrence and Diane Martel (performed by Jennifer Lopez); "Lose Control" – Dave Meyers and Missy Elliott (performed by Missy Elliott featuring Ciara and Fatman Scoop); "Vertigo" – Alex and Martin (performed by U2)	
2006	Robert Hales	"Crazy" (performed by Gnarls Barkley)	"Dani California" – Tony Kaye (performed by Red Hot Chili Peppers); "Miss Murder" – Marc Webb (performed by AFI); "Testify" – Anthony Mandler (performed by Common); "Wasteland" – Kevin Kerslake (performed by 10 Years)	
2007	Samuel Bayer	"What Goes Around... Comes Around" (performed by Justin Timberlake)	"Beautiful Liar" – Jake Nava (performed by Beyoncé and Shakira); "Candyman" – Matthew Rolston and Christina Aguilera (performed by Christina Aguilera); "Stronger" – Hype Williams (performed by Kanye West); "Umbrella" – Chris Applebaum (performed by Rihanna featuring Jay-Z); "What I've Done" – Joe Hahn (performed by Linkin Park)	
2008	Erykah Badu and Mr. Roboto	"Honey" (performed by Erykah Badu)	"Nine in the Afternoon" – Shane Drake (performed by Panic! at the Disco); "Shadow of the Day" – Joe Hahn (performed by Linkin Park); "Take a Bow" – Anthony Mandler (performed by Rihanna); "When I Grow Up" – Joseph Kahn (performed by Pussycat Dolls)	
2009	Marc Webb	"21 Guns" (performed by Green Day)	"Circus" – Francis Lawrence (performed by Britney Spears); "Good Girls Go Bad" – Kai Regan (performed by Cobra Starship (featuring Leighton Meester)); "Paparazzi" – Jonas Åkerlund (performed by Lady Gaga); "Single Ladies (Put a Ring on It)" – Jake Nava (performed by Beyoncé)	

=== 2010s ===
Year	Winner(s)	Work	Nominees	Ref.
2010	Francis Lawrence	"Bad Romance" (performed by Lady Gaga)	"Empire State of Mind" – Hype Williams (performed by Jay-Z and Alicia Keys); "Funhouse" – Dave Meyers (performed by P!nk); "Kings and Queens" – Bartholomew Cubbins (performed by Thirty Seconds to Mars); "Not Afraid" – Rich Lee (performed by Eminem)	
2011	Adam Yauch	"Make Some Noise" (performed by Beastie Boys)	"E.T." – Floria Sigismondi (performed by Katy Perry featuring Kanye West); "Hurricane" – Bartholomew Cubbins (performed by Thirty Seconds to Mars); "Love the Way You Lie" – Joseph Kahn (performed by Eminem featuring Rihanna); "Rolling in the Deep" – Sam Brown (performed by Adele)	
2012	Romain Gavras	"Bad Girls" (performed by M.I.A.)	"Big Bad Wolf" – Keith Schofield (performed by Duck Sauce); "Otis" – Spike Jonze (performed by Jay-Z and Kanye West featuring Otis Redding); "Princess of China" – Adria Petty and Alan Bibby (performed by Coldplay featuring Rihanna); "Swim Good" – Nabil Elderkin (performed by Frank Ocean)	
2013	David Fincher	"Suit & Tie" (performed by Justin Timberlake featuring Jay-Z)	"Can't Hold Us" – Ryan Lewis, Jason Koenig and Jon Jon Augustavo (performed by Macklemore and Ryan Lewis featuring Ray Dalton); "Carry On" – Anthony Mandler (performed by Fun.); "Sacrilege" – Megaforce (performed by Yeah Yeah Yeahs); "Started from the Bottom" – Director X and Drake (performed by Drake)	
2014	DANIELS	"Turn Down for What" (performed by DJ Snake and Lil Jon)	"The Monster" – Rich Lee (performed by Eminem featuring Rihanna); "Pretty Hurts" – Melina Matsoukas (performed by Beyoncé); "Wrecking Ball" – Terry Richardson (performed by Miley Cyrus); "The Writing's on the Wall" – Damian Kulash, Aaron Duffy and Bob Partington (performed by OK Go)	
2015	Colin Tilley and the Little Homies	"Alright" (performed by Kendrick Lamar)	"Bad Blood" – Joseph Kahn (performed by Taylor Swift featuring Kendrick Lamar); "Sober" – Hiro Murai (performed by Childish Gambino); "Take Me to Church" – Brendan Canty and Conal Thomson (performed by Hozier); "Uptown Funk" – Bruno Mars and Cameron Duddy (performed by Mark Ronson featuring Bruno Mars)	
2016	Melina Matsoukas	"Formation" (performed by Beyoncé)	"Hello" – Xavier Dolan (performed by Adele); "Lazarus" – Johan Renck (performed by David Bowie); "The Less I Know the Better" – Canada (performed by Tame Impala); "Up&Up" – Vania Heymann and Gal Muggia (performed by Coldplay)	
2017	Dave Meyers and The Little Homies	"HUMBLE." (performed by Kendrick Lamar)	"24K Magic" – Cameron Duddy and Bruno Mars (performed by Bruno Mars); "Chained to the Rhythm" – Mathew Cullen (performed by Katy Perry featuring Skip Marley); "Reminder" – Glenn Michael (performed by The Weeknd); "Scars to Your Beautiful" – Aaron A (performed by Alessia Cara)	
2018	Hiro Murai	"This is America" (performed by Childish Gambino)	"Apeshit" – Ricky Saix (performed by The Carters); "God's Plan" – Karena Evans (performed by Drake); "In My Blood" – Jay Martin (performed by Shawn Mendes); "Perfect" – Jason Koenig (performed by Ed Sheeran); "Say Something" – Arturo Perez Jr. (performed by Justin Timberlake featuring Chris Stapleton)	
2019	Calmatic	"Old Town Road (Remix)" (performed by Lil Nas X featuring Billy Ray Cyrus)	"Bad Guy" – Dave Meyers (performed by Billie Eilish); "Cellophane" – Andrew Thomas Huang (performed by FKA Twigs); "Thank U, Next" – Hannah Lux Davis (performed by Ariana Grande); "No New Friends" – Dano Cerny (performed by LSD); "You Need to Calm Down" – Taylor Swift and Drew Kirsch (performed by Taylor Swift)	

=== 2020s ===
Year	Winner(s)	Work	Nominees	Ref.
2020	Taylor Swift	"The Man" (performed by Taylor Swift)	"Adore You" – Dave Meyers (performed by Harry Styles); "Blinding Lights" – Anton Tammi (performed by The Weeknd); "Don't Start Now" – Nabil (performed by Dua Lipa); "Say So" – Hannah Lux Davis (performed by Doja Cat); "Xanny" – Billie Eilish (performed by Billie Eilish)	
2021	Lil Nas X and Tanu Muino	"Montero (Call Me by Your Name)" (performed by Lil Nas X)	"Franchise" – Travis Scott (performed by Travis Scott featuring Young Thug and M.I.A.); "Lumberjack" – Wolf Haley (performed by Tyler, the Creator); "Popstar" – Julien Christian Lutz aka Director X (performed by DJ Khaled featuring Drake); "Willow" – Taylor Swift (performed by Taylor Swift); "Your Power" – Billie Eilish (performed by Billie Eilish)	
2022	Taylor Swift	All Too Well: The Short Film (performed by Taylor Swift)	"Family Ties" – Dave Free (performed by Baby Keem and Kendrick Lamar); "Happier Than Ever" – Billie Eilish (performed by Billie Eilish); "Shivers" – Dave Meyers (performed by Ed Sheeran); "As It Was" – Tanu Muino (performed by Harry Styles); "Industry Baby" – Christian Breslauer (performed by Lil Nas X and Jack Harlow)	
2023	Taylor Swift	"Anti-Hero" (performed by Taylor Swift)	"Attention" – Tanu Muiño (performed by Doja Cat); "Count Me Out" – Dave Free and Kendrick Lamar (performed by Kendrick Lamar); "Falling Back" – Director X (performed by Drake); "Her" – Colin Tilley (performed by Megan Thee Stallion); "Kill Bill" – Christian Breslauer (performed by SZA); "Unholy" – Floria Sigismondi (performed by Sam Smith and Kim Petras)	
2024	Taylor Swift	"Fortnight" (performed by Taylor Swift featuring Post Malone)	"Boa" – Daniel Iglesias Jr. (performed by Megan Thee Stallion); "Houdini" – Rich Lee (performed by Eminem); "Please Please Please" – Bardia Zeinali (performed by Sabrina Carpenter); "Tiny Moves" – Alex Lockett and Margaret Qualley (performed by Bleachers); "We Can't Be Friends (Wait for Your Love)" – Christian Breslauer (performed by Ariana Grande)	
2025	Lady Gaga, Bethany Vargas and Parris Goebel	"Abracadabra" (performed by Lady Gaga)	"APT." – Bruno Mars and Daniel Ramos (performed by Rosé and Bruno Mars); Brighter Days Ahead – Christian Breslauer (performed by Ariana Grande); "Guess" – Aidan Zamiri (performed by Charli XCX featuring Billie Eilish); "Manchild" – Vania Heymann and Gal Muggia (performed by Sabrina Carpenter); "Not Like Us" – Dave Free and Kendrick Lamar (performed by Kendrick Lamar)	
2026	Taylor Swift	"Opalite" (performed by Taylor Swift)	Confessions II – The Film – TORSO (performed by Madonna); "Hate That I Made You Love Me" – Christian Breslauer (performed by Ariana Grande); "House Tour" – Sabrina Carpenter and Margaret Qualley (performed by Sabrina Carpenter); "I Just Might" – Bruno Mars and Daniel Ramos (performed by Bruno Mars); "Storm" – Romain Gavras (performed by Gener8ion featuring Yung Lean)	

== Director statistics ==
=== Multiple wins ===
5 wins

- Taylor Swift

3 wins

- David Fincher

2 wins

- Samuel Bayer
- Spike Jonze
- Jonathan Dayton
- The Little Homies
- Valerie Faris

=== Multiple nominations ===
8 nominations

- David Fincher
- Dave Meyers
- Taylor Swift

6 nominations

- Francis Lawrence

5 nominations

- Steven Barron
- Mark Romanek
- Spike Jonze
- Jonathan Dayton
- Valerie Faris
- Hype Williams
- Christian Breslauer

4 nominations

- Joseph Kahn

3 nominations

- Daniel Kleinman
- Dr. Dre
- Phillip Atwell
- Billie Eilish
- Jonas Åkerlund
- Bruno Mars
- Director X
- Dave Free
- Rich Lee
- Anthony Mandler
- Tanu Muino
- Floria Sigismondi

2 nominations

- Tim Newman
- Andy Morahan
- Daniel Ramos
- Tarsem
- Stéphane Sednaoui
- Matthew Rolston
- F. Gary Gray
- Jesse Peretz
- Jonathan Glazer
- David LaChapelle
- Joe Hahn
- Jake Nava
- Bartholomew Cubbins
- Kendrick Lamar
- Vania Heymann
- Gal Muggia
- Romain Gavras
- Samuel Bayer
- Hannah Lux Davis
- Cameron Duddy
- Nabil Elderkin
- Missy Elliott
- Michel Gondry
- Jason Koenig
- The Little Homies
- Melina Matsoukas
- Hiro Murai
- Colin Tilley
- Marc Webb
- Margaret Qualley

== Artist statistics ==
=== Multiple wins ===
5 wins

- Taylor Swift (Note: 5 also as director.)

3 wins

- Madonna

2 wins

- Fatboy Slim
- Green Day
- Jay-Z (Note: 1 as a featured artist.)
- Justin Timberlake
- Kendrick Lamar
- Lady Gaga (Note: 1 also as co-director.)
- Lil Nas X (Note: 1 also as co-director.)
- R.E.M.

=== Multiple nominations ===
8 nominations

- Eminem
- Taylor Swift (Note: 1 also as co-director; 6 also as a director.)

6 nominations

- Jay-Z (Note: 2 as a featured artist; 1 with The Carters.)
- Kendrick Lamar (Note: 2 also as co-director.)

5 nominations

- Beyoncé (Note: 1 with The Carters.)
- Billie Eilish (Note: 3 also as director; 1 as a featured artist.)
- R.E.M.
- Rihanna (Note: 3 as a featured artist.)

4 nominations

- Ariana Grande
- Bruno Mars (Note: 3 also as co-director.)
- Drake (Note: 1 as a featured artist.)
- Missy Elliott (Note: 2 also as co-director.)
- Madonna
- Justin Timberlake
- Red Hot Chili Peppers

3 nominations

- Coldplay
- Green Day
- Kanye West (Note: 1 as a featured artist.)
- Lady Gaga (Note: 1 also as co-director.)
- Lil Nas X (Note: 1 also as co-director.)
- Linkin Park
- Sabrina Carpenter (Note: 1 also as co-director.)
- ZZ Top

2 nominations

- Adele
- Aerosmith
- Beastie Boys
- Childish Gambino
- Chris Isaak
- Doja Cat
- Don Henley
- Ed Sheeran
- En Vogue
- Fatboy Slim
- Foo Fighters
- George Michael (Note: 1 also as co-director.)
- Harry Styles
- Janet Jackson (Note: 1 as a featured artist.)
- Katy Perry
- Megan Thee Stallion
- M.I.A. (Note: 1 as a featured artist.)
- OutKast
- Steve Winwood
- The Smashing Pumpkins
- The Weeknd
- The White Stripes
- Thirty Seconds to Mars
- TLC
- U2
- Van Halen

== See also ==
- MTV Movie Award for Best New Filmmaker
