= Atsushi Fujiwara =

Japanese photographer

Atsushi Fujiwara (藤原 敦, Fujiwara Atsushi; born 1963) is a Japanese photographer. He is the co-founder of and the main contributor to the Japanese photo magazine Asphalt. His work has been exhibited both in Japan and internationally.

== Life and career ==
Fujiwara was born in Okayama City in 1963. His family soon moved to Ōyamazaki (Kyoto), and moved again to Shiga when he was at primary school. He lived in Yasu (Shiga) until he was 26, and considers himself a native of Shiga.

After working as an interior designer, Fujiwara went to Britain in 1989, working as an architectural designer and in the restaurant business. Back in Japan, in 2005 he set up a photographic studio. A year later, he started out as a photographer, this unusually late start being helped by the photographers Kiyoshi Tanno and Daidō Moriyama.

Together with the photographer Shin'ichirō Tōjinbara (唐仁原信一郎), Fujiwara set out to create a photography magazine, Asphalt, that would avoid the commercial priorities of mainstream Japanese photography and photography magazines, and that would run for just ten issues. From the second issue on, Akira Hasegawa (長谷川明) joined as editor, and the normal pattern was to combine work by Fujiwara, Tōjinbara and, as a guest photographer, someone who was not already a star but who instead merited exposure. These guest photographers included Yang Seungwoo) and Takehiko Nakafuji (中藤毅彦). (Note: List of contributing photographers, Asphalt archive.) Asphalt is in the holdings of several art museums outside Japan, (Note: Interview by Akina (a photobook publisher) of Fujiwara about Asphalt.) and its content is available online. (Note: Archive of the magazine Asphalt.)

Nangokusho: Ode to the Southern Lands of Japan (2013) was the first of four photobooks by Fujiwara to be published by Sokyu-sha, each of these containing work in black and white. It borrows the title Nangokushō (南国頌) from a collection of tanka by Fujiwara's grandfather, Tōmon Fujiwara (the pseudonym of Hiroji Fujiwara), who, after workplace conflicts elsewhere, had eventually settled down to a satisfying post as teacher in Kagoshima. The book presents photographs of Kagoshima from 2009 and 2010. (Note: Description (in Japanese) of the book Nangokusho by Shuntaro Kanekiyo; visual presentation of it by Josef Chladek; review of it by Adam Bell.)

Butterfly Had a Dream shows the family life in Miyako-jima and the work and single life in Tokyo of a professional kinbaku practitioner. Her father, a suicide victim, had been a professional butterfly collector, and the book brings to mind the metamorphoses in the life of a butterfly. (Note: Visual presentation of the book Butterfly Had a Dream by Josef Chladek; review of it by Jan-Frederik Rust; short interview by 3/3 of Fujiwara and the book's designer (Koichi Hara) about it.)

As a child, Fujiwara had visited Nagashima Aiseien, a leper sanatorium, whose general manager was an uncle of his. He returned there 35 years later, influenced by Kaijin Akashi, who had been incarcerated there and had died there, but whose poems continued to express joy despite his loss of sight and other physical decay. For his book Poet Island (2015), Fujiwara photographed the sanatorium and depicted mementoes of Akashi's. Recommending an exhibition of these photographs at Zen Foto Gallery (Roppongi), Kōtarō Iizawa praised this and Fujiwara's two previous photobooks as of high quality. (Note: Review (in Spanish) of the book Poet Island by Gabriela Cendoya; review of it by Christer Ek; review of it by Jan-Frederik Rust.)

Semimaru (2017) is named after a noh play that in turn is named after its main character. The book looks for traces of Semimaru on Mt Ōsaka and elsewhere in what is now Shiga prefecture. (Note: Visual presentation of the book Semimaru by Josef Chladek; review of it by Jan-Frederik Rust.)

== Exhibitions ==
- Trace, Sokyu-sha Gallery (Shinjuku, Tokyo), 2009.
- Asphalt photo exhibition, Rencontres d'Arles (Arles, France), 2010 (with work by Kōji Onaka and Photographer Hal); Zen Foto Gallery (Beijing), 2011 (with work by Yang Seung-Woo and Muge); Tanto Tempo Gallery (Kobe, Japan), 2012
- Kagoshima, Sokyu-sha Gallery (Shinjuku, Tokyo), 2010.
- Poet's island, Sokyu-sha Gallery (Shinjuku, Tokyo), 2011.
- Butterfly had a dream, Sokyu-sha Gallery (Shinjuku, Tokyo), 2012; Tanto Tempo Gallery (Kobe, Japan), 2014; Reclaim Photography West Midlands 2016, Wolverhampton Art Gallery, England, 2016; 6th Different Dimension Festival, the State Novosibirsk Art Museum, Russia, 2016
- Nangokusho, Sokyu-sha Gallery (Shinjuku, Tokyo), 2013; Tanto Tempo Gallery (Kobe, Japan), 2014; Reclaim Photography Festival, Lighthouse Media Centre (Wolverhampton, England), 2018
- Nangokusho (together with work by Yang Seung-Woo and Tomohisa Tobitsuka), In)(between record vol. 1, In)(between Art Gallery (Paris), 2013.
- Japanese Eyes, In)(between record vol. 12, In)(between Art Gallery (Paris), 2014. Group exhibition.
- Poet Island, Zen Foto Gallery (Roppongi Tokyo), 2015; Gallery722 (Okayama, Japan), 2015; Sokyu-sha Gallery (Shinjuku, Tokyo), 2015; Reclaim Photography West Midlands (Birmingham, England), 2017
- Semimaru, Sokyu-sha Gallery (Shinjuku, Tokyo), 2017; Gallery722 (Okayama, Japan), 2017.
- Un regard sur ses publications = A Look into His Publications, In)(between record vol. 31, In)(between Art Gallery (Paris), 2017.
- Tukurohi, Mii-dera (Ōtsu, Japan), 2018.
- Semimaru, within Beauty in Imperfection (group show), Reclaim Photography Festival West Midlands (Birmingham England), 2020
- 2200Miles, Books and Modern, Tokyo, 2020 + Blue Sheep Gallery Tokyo, 2020
- 2200Miles, Gallery722 (Okayama, Japan), 2020
- Butterfly Had a Dream, Casa Da Caltura De Avintes, Portugal), 2021
- 2200Miles, Rosphoto (Saint Petersburg, Russia), 2024
- 2200Miles, Gallery Negative (Busan, South Korea), 2024
- Butterfly Had a Dream, Space S (Busan, South Korea), 2024
- Sakura River, Zen Foto Gallery (Tokyo, Japan), 2024

== Publications ==
- Asphalt (10 issues). Asphalt Publishing, 2008–2012.
- Nangokushō (南国頌) = Nangokusho: Ode to the Southern Lands of Japan. Tokyo: Sokyu-sha, 2013. OCLC 840124636.
- Chō no mita yume (蝶の見た夢) = Butterfly Had a Dream. Tokyo: Sokyu-sha, 2014. OCLC 880594778.
- Wombat No. 16. Paris: Wombat, 2015. Contains a print by Fujiwara, a portfolio by William Klein, a print by Utagawa Hiroshige, and a "silkscreen print with Aesop complicity". (Note: Publisher's description of Wombat No. 16.)
- Shijin no shima (詩人の島) = Poet Island. Tokyo: Sokyu-sha, 2015. ISBN 9784904120477.
- Semimaru (蟬丸) = Semimaru. Tokyo: Sokyu-sha, 2017. ISBN 9784904120828
- 2200Miles. Tokyo: Sokyu-sha, 2019. ISBN 9784909883124
- Sakura River. Tokyo: Zen Foto Gallery, 2024. ISBN 9784910244334
