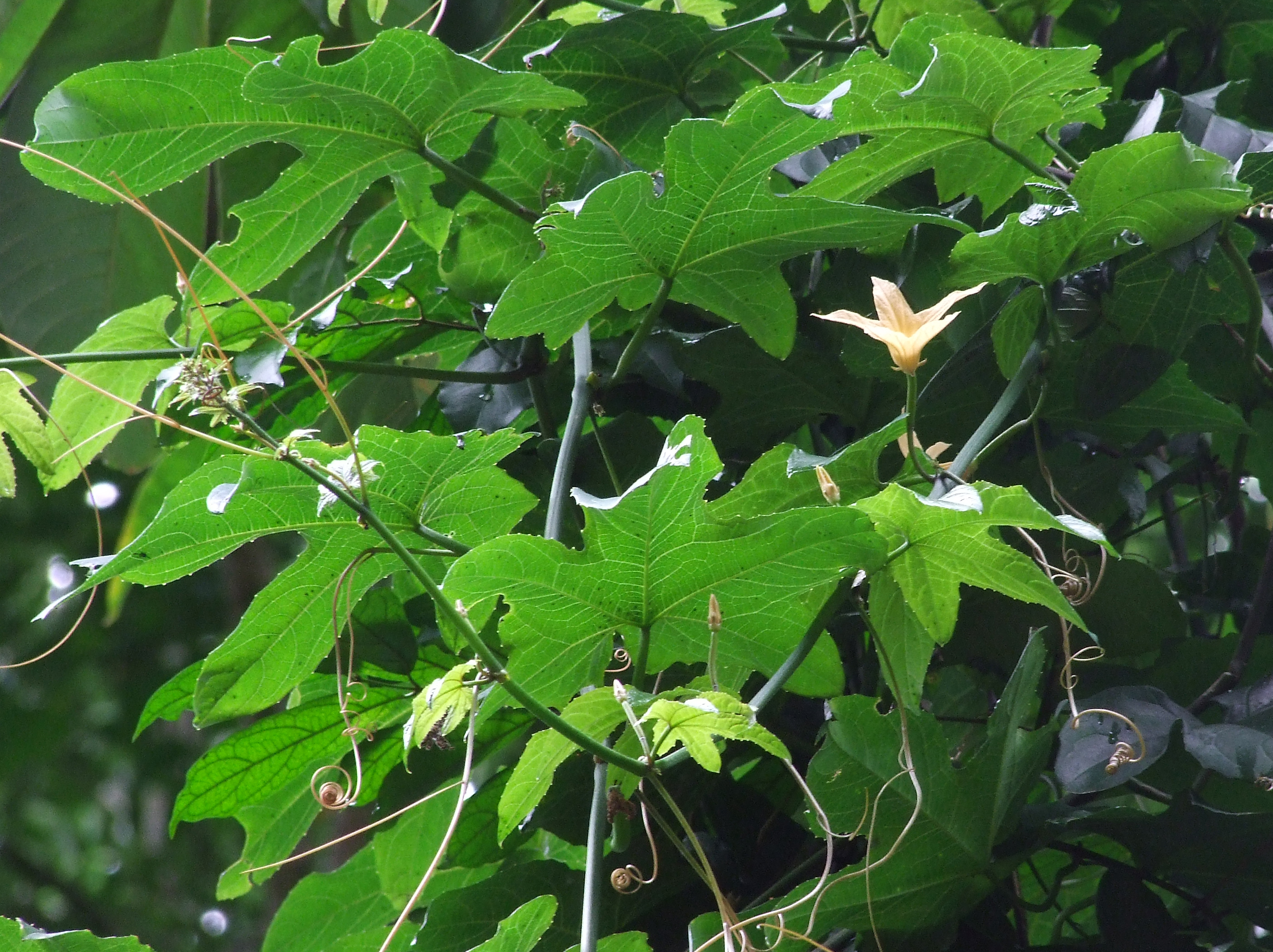

Conservation status
- Least Concern (IUCN 3.1)

Scientific classification
- Kingdom: Plantae
- Clade: Tracheophytes
- Clade: Angiosperms
- Clade: Eudicots
- Clade: Rosids
- Order: Cucurbitales
- Family: Cucurbitaceae
- Genus: Coccinia
- Species: C. grandiflora

Binomial name
- Coccinia grandiflora Cogn.

Synonyms
- Coccinia calantha Gilg; Coccinia engleri Gilg

= Coccinia grandiflora =

Species of flowering plant

Coccinia grandiflora is an East African species of Coccinia which was first described in 1895 by Alfred Cogniaux.

== Description ==
Perennial, dioecious climber. Shoot length up to 20 m and up to 6 cm in diameter. Leaves are alternate with 2.5–13 cm long petiole, lamina 12–20 × 11–20 cm, profoundly 5-lobate, more or less auriculate. Upper lamina glabrous with clear to whitish pustules. Lower lamina paler than upper lamina, glabrous, often with small dark glands along the main nerves. Fresh shoots, lower sides of petioles and leaves are glabrous, sometimes with soft white hairs. Tendrils unequally bifid. Probracts up to 5 mm long.

Flowers in each sex usually solitary, sometimes in few-flowered racemes. Receptacle pale green, glabrous. Calyx teeth 4–13 mm long, lineal, narrowly lanceolate to triangulate, tip subulate to subacute. Corolla 4–6.5 cm long, apricot, salmon, yellowish-buff to yellow, lobes 2–4.7 cm. Stamens 3, reduced to staminodia in female flowers. Anthers in male flowers sinuate, in a globose head. Ovary cylindrical, glabrous. Style columnar, yellowish to buff. Stigmas 2-lobed, yellow. Fruits cylindrical, up to 30 cm long and 2–4 cm in diameter, glabrous, when unripe green, ripe (orange-)red. Seeds 4.5 × 2.5 × 1–1.2 mm (L/W/H), symmetrically obovate, face flatly lenticular.

Chromosomes 2n = 24.

== Distribution ==
SE Kenya, NE to S Tanzania, Malawi, W Mocambique, E Zimbabwe.

== Ecology ==
Lowland rainforest communities, gallery forests, humid woodlands that degraded from rainforest. Flowering around the year.

== Etymology ==
The epithet refers to the large flowers, however, similarly large flowers are also found in the closely related Coccinia schliebenii.

== Systematics and evolution ==
According to molecular analyses, Coccinia grandiflora is closely related to Coccinia schliebenii. Both species share large flowers and cylindrical fruits and occur in rainforests and humid woodland communities. Their common ancestor likely evolved from a species occurring in drier woodlands.

== Literature ==
- Holstein, N. (2015). "Monograph of Coccinia (Cucurbitaceae)". PhytoKeys (54): 1–166. doi:10.3897/phytokeys.54.3285. PMC 4547038. PMID 26312043.
