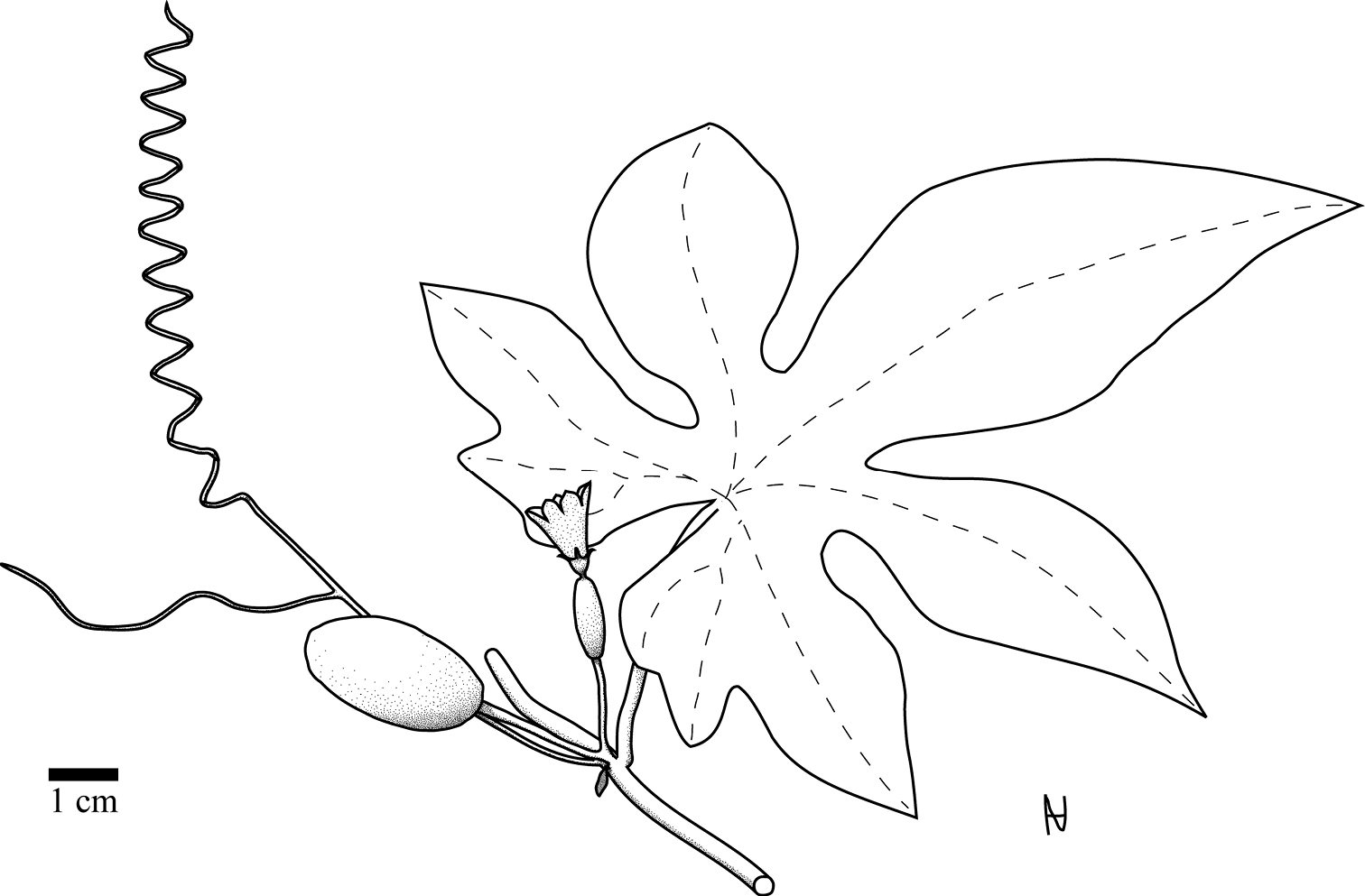

Scientific classification
- Kingdom: Plantae
- Clade: Tracheophytes
- Clade: Angiosperms
- Clade: Eudicots
- Clade: Rosids
- Order: Cucurbitales
- Family: Cucurbitaceae
- Genus: Coccinia
- Species: C. intermedia

Binomial name
- Coccinia intermedia Holstein

= Coccinia intermedia =

Species of flowering plant

Coccinia intermedia is a species of Coccinia which was first described in 2011 by Norbert Holstein.

== Description ==
Perennial, diclinous climber; shoot length unknown, but likely several meters. Shoots lignify with whitish bark and up to 1 cm diam. Fresh shoots green, glabrous, older shoots with clear to white pustules. Petioles 2.8–10.8 cm, glabrous, when older with clear to white pustules. Leaves 6–15 × 7–18 cm, shallowly to profoundly 5-lobate, more or less auriculate. Upper lamina glabrous with clear to whitish pustules. Lower lamina paler than upper lamina, glabrous, often with small dark glands near the leaf base. Tendrils simple or bifid. Probracts up to 2.5 mm long, glabrous, apex rounded. Male flowers in few-flowered racemes, likely sometimes accompanied by a single flower. Common peduncle up to 1 cm, pedicels in racemose flowers 2–4 mm, glabrous. Bracts up to 1.5 mm long, round to obovoid. Receptacle pale green, glabrous. Calyx teeth 1.5 mm long, lineal to narrow triangulate, erect with slightly recurved tips. Corolla campanulate, 1.6 cm long, pale reddish-yellow to yellow, lobes 0.7 cm long. Anthers sinuate, in a globose head. Pollen unknown. Female flowers 1–3 clustered (strongly reduced raceme). Pedicels 0.6–1.2 cm, glabrous. Perianth like in males. Ovary fusiform, glabrous. Stigma and staminodes unknown. Fruit 4.5 × 2.5 cm, elliptical to oblong, smooth. Unripe green with pale green longitudinal mottling. Ripe orange?, more likely becoming red via orange ripening stage. Fruit with waxy cover. Size of mature seeds unknown (≥ 5.5 × 3.5 × 1.3 mm), symmetrical (to slightly asymmetrical), face flat.

== Distribution ==
NE Ivory Coast, SE Ghana (likely also in the north), S Togo (likely also in the north), NW Benin. Based on the current collections, Coccinia intermedia is likely to occur in the Dahomey Gap region and the Isoberlinia woodlands of West Africa.

== Ecology ==
Wooded grasslands (semi-humid savanna), woodlands, dry forests, and along rivers. Flowering specimens have been collected during May, August, and October, which in each site was during or shortly after the rainy season.

== Etymology ==
The epithet refers to the species' status as the only Coccinia from West Africa that occurs in habitats intermediate between semi-arid and humid conditions. Morphologically, Coccinia intermedia combines characters also found in the other four West African species although not in this combination.
