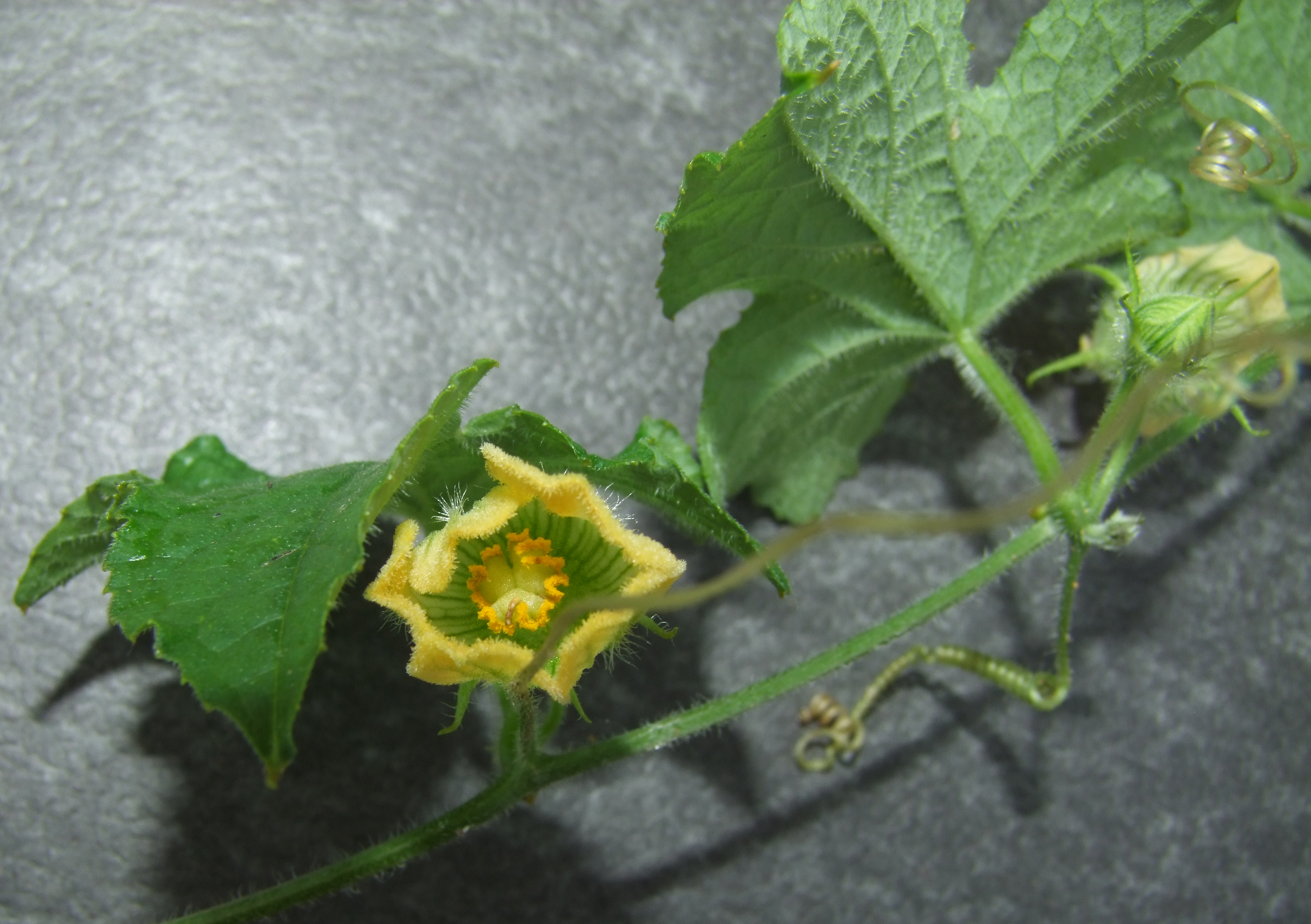

Scientific classification
- Kingdom: Plantae
- Clade: Tracheophytes
- Clade: Angiosperms
- Clade: Eudicots
- Clade: Rosids
- Order: Cucurbitales
- Family: Cucurbitaceae
- Genus: Coccinia
- Species: C. abyssinica

Binomial name
- Coccinia abyssinica (Lam.) Cogn.

= Coccinia abyssinica =

Species of flowering plant

Coccinia abyssinica is an Ethiopian species of Coccinia which was first described by Jean-Baptiste Lamarck. The tuber is under its Oromo name anchote a well-known local crop, but also the leaves are eaten.

== Description ==
Perennial, dioecious climber. Shoot length up to 5 m, more or less densely covered with white hairs. Leaves are alternate with 1.5-14.0 cm long petiole, lamina 7.5–12.0 × 6.5–12.0 cm, often cordate to profoundly 3- or 5-lobate. If lobate, then the central lobe is dominating and has a sharp tip. Upper lamina glabrous with clear to whitish pustules, sometimes with white hairs. Lower lamina paler than upper lamina, with white hairs, that can appear wart-like when broken off. Tendrils simple. Probracts up to 3 mm long.

Flowers of male plants solitary or in few-flowered racemes. Flowers in female plant solitary. Flowers in each sex usually solitary, sometimes in few-flowered racemes. Receptacle pale green, glabrous. Calyx teeth 2–4 mm long, lineal-subulate. Corolla ca. 1.4 cm long, yellow to slightly orange, lobes ca. 0.5 cm. Stamens in male flowers 3, connected to a central column. Anthers in male flowers sinuate, in a globose head. Fruits short elliptical, 5.5-6.0 cm long and 3.5–4.0 cm in diameter, glabrous, when unripe green, ripe orange-red, sometimes with remaining yellowish longitudinal mottling. Seeds 5-6 × 3 × 1.5 mm (L/W/H), slightly asymmetrically obovate, face flat.

== Distribution ==
Widespread in the highlands of Ethiopia between 1300 and 2800 m.

== Ecology ==
Along lake shores, in forest clearings and degraded forests, evergreen shrublands. Cultivated. Flowering between June and October.

== Use ==
Coccinia abyssinica tubers are an important staple crop in the Ethiopian highlands. The tubers are rich in starch and are cooked. Also the young shoots and the leaves are cooked and eaten around Dembi Dolo, Oromia State. There are also beliefs about medical use, but none is scientifically verified so far. The relatively high content of calcium might be the reason for the local belief that eating C. abyssinica helps against fractured bones. The edibility of the fruits is disputed, eventually, there are different races.

== Systematics and evolution ==
According to molecular analyses, Coccinia abyssinica is closely related to Coccinia megarrhiza. Both species look similar, but, among other character traits, they differ by the leaf shape. The leaves of C. abyssinica have a long pointed (central) tip, while the tip of C. megarrhiza leaves are acute or obtuse. Coccinia abyssinica is distributed in the more humid highlands, while C. megarrhiza occurs in the dry lowlands. Both species belong to the C. rehmannii-clade that shares the character of usually producing a dark green halo around the white spots on ripening fruits.

== Literature ==
- Holstein, N. (2015). "Monograph of Coccinia (Cucurbitaceae)". PhytoKeys (54): 1–166. doi:10.3897/phytokeys.54.3285. PMC 4547038. PMID 26312043.
