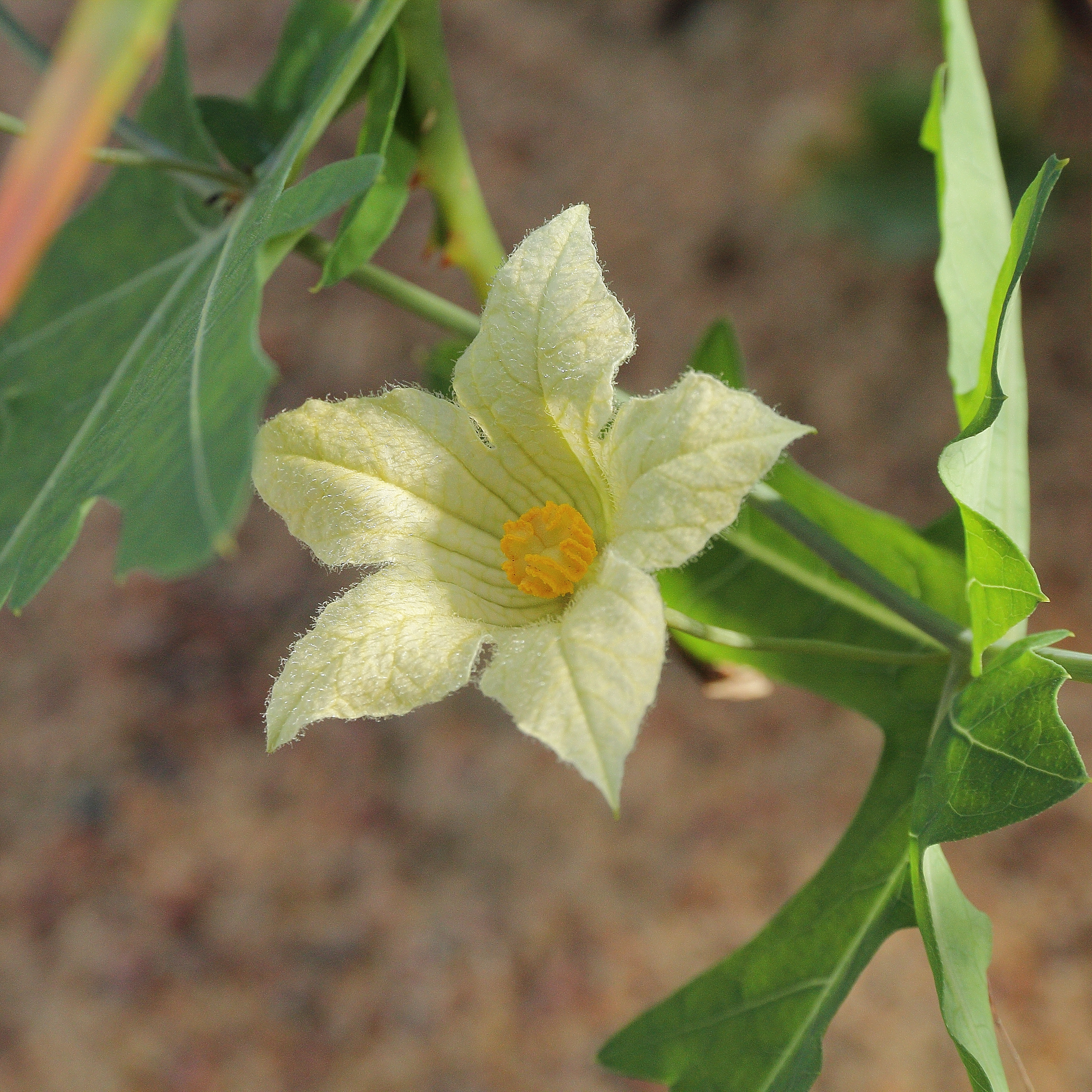

Scientific classification
- Kingdom: Plantae
- Clade: Embryophytes
- Clade: Tracheophytes
- Clade: Spermatophytes
- Clade: Angiosperms
- Clade: Eudicots
- Clade: Rosids
- Order: Cucurbitales
- Family: Cucurbitaceae
- Genus: Coccinia
- Species: C. sessilifolia

Binomial name
- Coccinia sessilifolia (Sond.) Cogn.

= Coccinia sessilifolia =

Species of flowering plant

Coccinia sessilifolia is a species of Coccinia from southern Africa.

== Description ==
Perennial, dioecious climber. The plants produce a woody hypocotyl tuber and herbaceous, up to 5 m long shoots. The shoots are glabrous and have a waxy bluish green cover. Leaves are alternate usually sessile. Only the first leaves leaves of the shoots and in rare cases on mature shoots, short petioles can be observed. The lamina is 1.5–12.5 × 2.2–13.5 cm, usually profoundly 5-lobate, more or less amplexicaulous. Upper lamina glabrous with clear to whitish pustules. Lower lamina paler than upper lamina, glabrous, often with small dark glands along the main nerves. Tendrils are simple, very rarely unequally bifid. Probracts up to 1.7 mm long but usually missing.

Flowers in each sex usually solitary, sometimes male flowers are in few-flowered racemes. Receptacle pale green, glabrous. Calyx teeth 1.5–3.5 mm long, lanceolate to (narrow) triangulate, erect to reflexed. Corolla 1.5–3 cm long, whitish cream to pale yellow, rarely dull orange-brown with conspicuous green venation, lobes 0.9–2 cm. Stamens 3, reduced to staminodia in female flowers. Anthers in male flowers sinuate, in a globose head. Ovary cylindrical, glabrous. Style in male flowers missing, in female flowers columnar, greenish yellow. Stigmas bulging, greenish yellow. Fruit 8–12 × 3–4 cm, ellipsoid to oblong, when immature green with white longitudinal spots to stripes with waxy bloom, ripe red. Seeds 6–8 × 3–3.5 × 1–1.5 mm, more or less symmetrically obovate, face flat.

Male and female plants have (2n=) 24 equally sized chromosomes.

== Distribution ==
Coccinia sessilifolia occurs in South Africa (Gauteng, Free State, Limpopo, Mpumalanga, North West, and western Northern Cape), Namibia (Erongo, Khomas, Oshana, Otjozondjupa), and Botswana (Central District. Kgatleng, North-West District, South-East District).

== Ecology ==
Semi-arid open habitats, except for Cape region and high mountains. Flowering January–May, October–December.

== Systematics and evolution ==
According to molecular DNA analyses, Coccinia sessilifolia is related to other South African species, such as Coccinia hirtella, Coccinia mackenii, and Coccinia quinqueloba. Some populations from the western part of Limpopo province have long petioles, but share all other characters with Coccinia sessilifolia. These were described as a distinct species: Coccinia variifolia A.Meeuse. Due to the strong similarities and the close relationship in the molecular phylogeny, Holstein (2015) interpreted that these populations are better dealt with as a variety of C. sessilifolia. Since long petioles are the dominant character state in all closer relatives, Coccinia sessilifolia var. variifolia can either be interpreted as a relict of long-petiolate ancestors or a secondary development of an ancestral character.
