= Tarsem =

Tarsem is an Indian given name that may refer to

- Tarsem Antil (born 1980), Indian film director
- Tarsem Jassar, Punjabi lyricist, singer and producer
- Tarsem King, Baron King of West Bromwich (1937–2013), British politician
- Tarsem Singh (born 1961), Indian-American film director
- Tarsem Singh (field hockey) (1946–2005), Indian field hockey player
- Tarsem Singh Purewal (c.1935–1995), Indian editor
