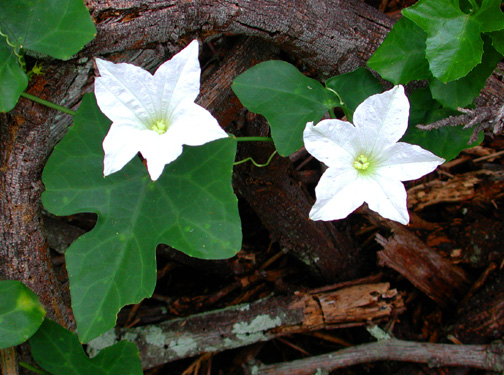
- Coccinia grandis

Scientific classification
- Kingdom: Plantae
- Clade: Tracheophytes
- Clade: Angiosperms
- Clade: Eudicots
- Clade: Rosids
- Order: Cucurbitales
- Family: Cucurbitaceae
- Subfamily: Cucurbitoideae
- Tribe: Benincaseae
- Genus: Coccinia; Wight & Arn.

Species
- C. abyssinica; C. adoensis; C. barteri; C. grandiflora; C. grandis; C. heterophylla; C. hirtella; C. intermedia; C. keayana; C. longicarpa; C. mackenii; C. megarrhiza; C. microphylla; C. mildbraedii; C. ogadensis; C. pwaniensis; C. quinqueloba; C. racemiflora; C. rehmannii; C. samburuensis; C. schliebenii; C. senensis; C. sessilifolia; C. subsessiliflora; C. trilobata

Synonyms
- Cephalandra Schrad. ex Eckl. & Zeyh.; Physedra Hook.f.; Staphylosyce Hook.f.

= Coccinia =

Genus of flowering plants

The scarlet gourds are a genus (Coccinia from the Greek, kokkinia or kokkinias - "red" or "scarlet") with 25 species. It is distributed in sub-Saharan Africa and with one species, C. grandis also in South Asia and Southeast Asia, and it is also introduced into the New World. Incidentally, C. grandis is also a cultivated crop and it is used for culinary and medical purposes.

== Description ==
Coccinia species are perennial climbing or creeping herbs. Climbing is supported by simple of unequally bifid tendrils. Most species develop a tuber from the hypocotyl, sometimes on roots. The cotyledons are simple, entire and have a blunt tip. The leaves are usually stalked, rarely sessile. The leaves are simple to deeply lobed, usually with teeth along the margin. The lower leaf side often bears small nectar-producing glands.

Coccinia species are dioecious, meaning that individual plants produce flowers with only male or only female organs. The sepals are connected and have five triangulate to lineal lobes. The corolla is also connected at the base and has five free lobes. The color of the corolla is creamy white to yellowish orange, rarely also snow-white or pinkish. The male flowers are solitary, in fascicles or often in racemes, female flowers are usually solitary, sometimes also in racemes. Male flowers have three stamens that are connected to a single filament column. The anthers form a globose head. The pollen is produced in S-shaped thecae. Female flowers have an inferior ovary consisting of three carpels and producing a single style. Each carpel ends in a bulging or 2-lobed stigma. Whereas male flowers lack any sign of female organs, female flowers contain three sterile stamens (staminodes). The fruit is a berry with red flesh and a red skin that rarely exhibits a white longitudinal mottling. The seeds are enclosed in a juicy hull (aril), grayish-beige, flat to lentil-shaped.

== Distribution ==
All species occur in sub-Saharan Africa, from semi-arid savannas to rain forests, rarely also mountain forests. The species adapted to these different habitats one to several times independently. One species, C. grandis also occurs in tropical Asia, but is also spreading to Australia, several Pacific Islands and the tropical Americas. Sometimes it behaves invasive, e.g. in Hawaii, where it is regarded as obnoxious weed.

== Use ==
The genus Coccinia is best known for C. grandis, commonly known as "ivy gourd". Its fruits can be eaten raw when ripe or cooked when unripe. In the latter case, it is used in curries. Young leaves and shoots are also edible. All used plants are a good source of carotenoids. The tuber of Coccinia abyssinica is cooked and a source of starch for the Oromo people in Ethiopia. Local culinary uses also exist. However, many species and also populations within species can be bitter due to cucurbitacins.

Coccinia grandis is also well known in ayurvedic medicine for diabetes treatment, and modern research seems to confirm that it might be of value in that application.

== Primary literature ==
- Holstein, N. (2015). "Monograph of Coccinia (Cucurbitaceae)". PhytoKeys (54): 1–166. doi:10.3897/phytokeys.54.3285. PMC 4547038. PMID 26312043.

== Gallery ==
Ovary and fruit

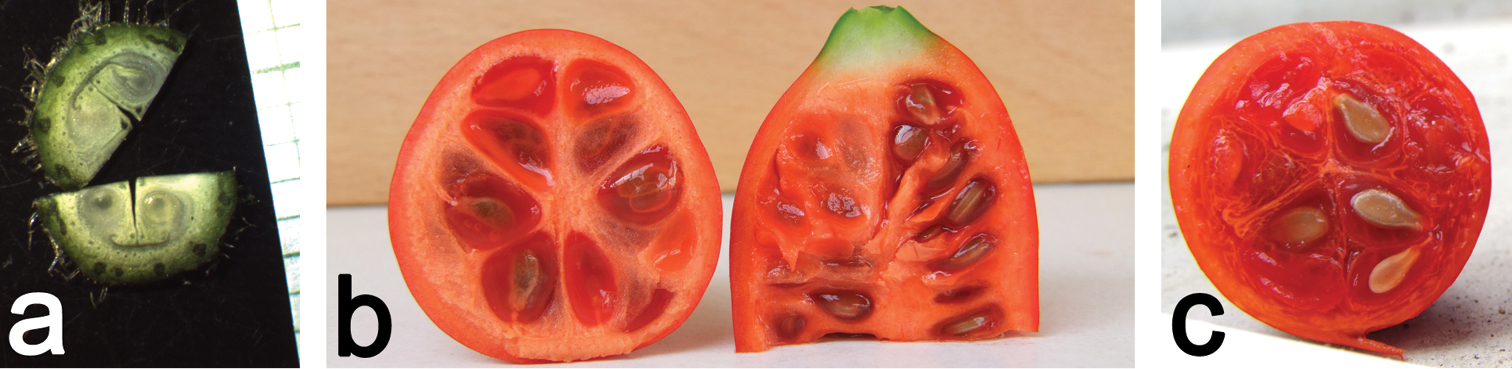
Holstein (2015): "a Cross-section through an ovary of C. hirtella. The ovules are anatropous with the micropyle facing outwards b Cross- and longitudinal section of a C. megarrhiza fruit. The seeds are enclosed in a hyaline hull (aril) and seemingly attached to the periphery c Cross-section through a fruit of C. sessilifolia. Note that the vascular bundles in the lower left of the picture bend in the periphery, so the placentation is not parietal but involute."

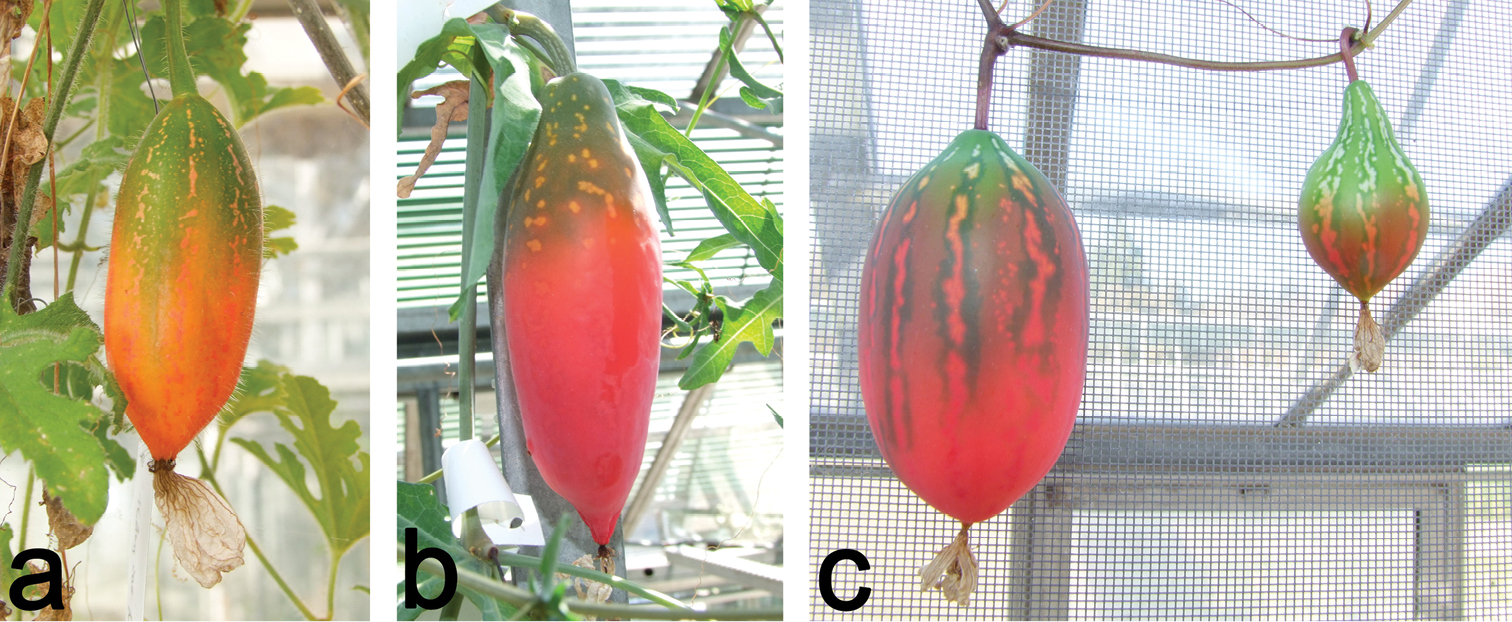
Holstein (2015): "a Ripening fruit of C. hirtella. Note the typical lobulate leaves of this species in the lower right b Ripening fruit of C. sessilifolia. The fruit, like the plant, bears a waxy bloom c Ripening fruits of C. megarrhiza have a dark green halo around the white longitudinal mottling. The left fruit is derived from pollination with C. megarrhiza pollen, whereas the smaller fruit on the right is derived from cross-pollination with C. trilobata (both pollinations were conducted on the same day)."

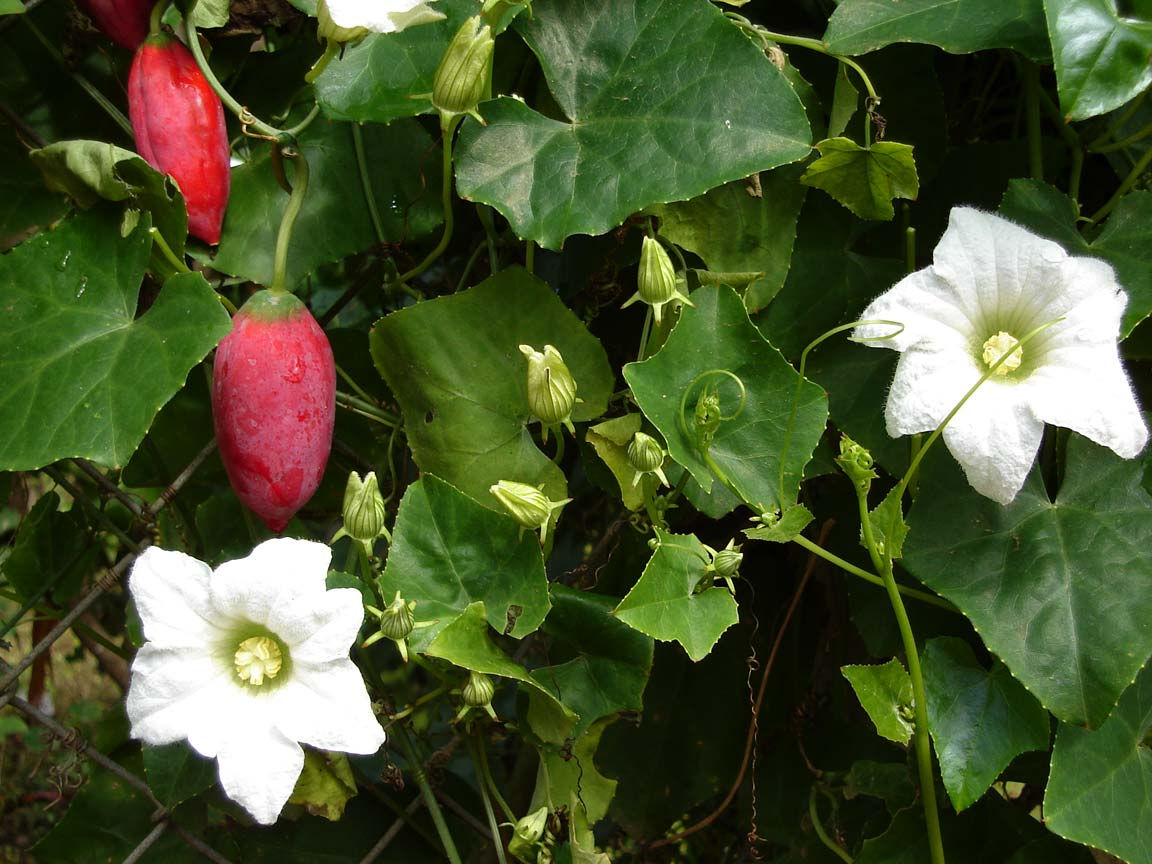
Coccinia grandis is the only one distributed also out of Africa, its immature fruits are consumed cooked as a vegetable, ripe fuits are edible raw.
