= Akashic records (disambiguation) =

In Theosophy and Anthroposophy, the Akashic records are believed to be a compendium of all universal events, thoughts, words, emotions, and intent ever to have occurred in the past, present, or future, regarding not just humans, but all entities and life forms.

Akashic records may also refer to:

- Akashic Records, an American record label founded by Craig Smith
- Akashic Re:cords, a 2016 Japanese role-playing video game
- Akashic Records of Bastard Magic Instructor, a Japanese light novel series
- Akasic Record, a 2001 album by Kalahari Surfers
- The Akashic Record, a 2012 album by Radioinactive
- Akashic Records, a level in the video game Geometry Dash

== See also ==
- Akasha (disambiguation)
