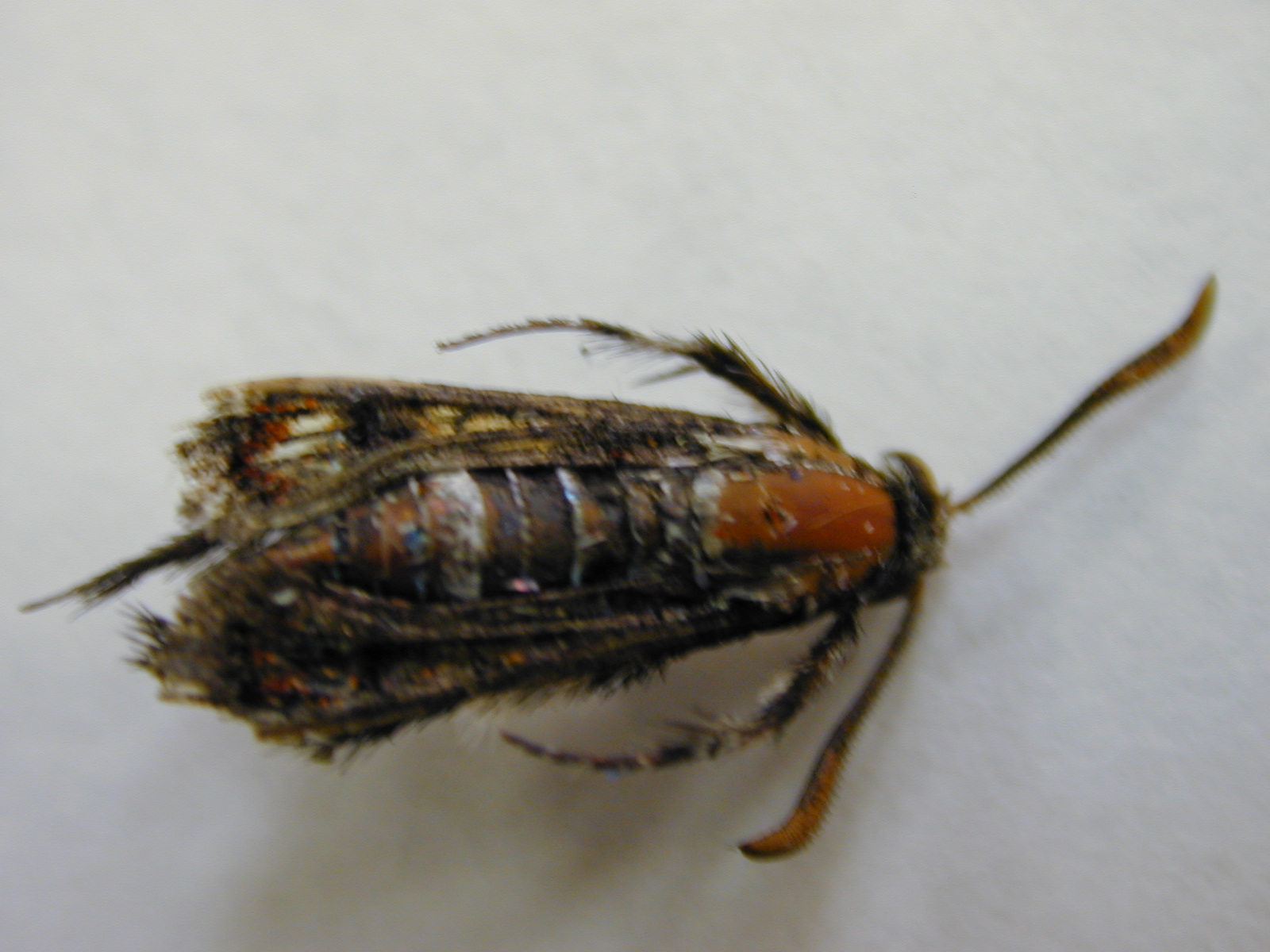

Scientific classification
- Domain: Eukaryota
- Kingdom: Animalia
- Phylum: Arthropoda
- Class: Insecta
- Order: Lepidoptera
- Family: Sesiidae
- Genus: Melittia
- Species: M. oedipus

Binomial name
- Melittia oedipus Oberthür, 1878

Synonyms
- Melittia ignidiscata Hampson, 1910; Melittia oedipoides Strand, 1913; Melittia thoracalis Strand, 1916

= Melittia oedipus =

Species of moth

Melittia oedipus, the African vine borer, is a moth of the family Sesiidae. It originates from Africa (where it is known from Equatorial Guinea, Malawi, South Africa, Tanzania, Zambia, Zimbabwe and Kenya), but has been introduced in Hawaii to control ivy gourd (Coccinia grandis).

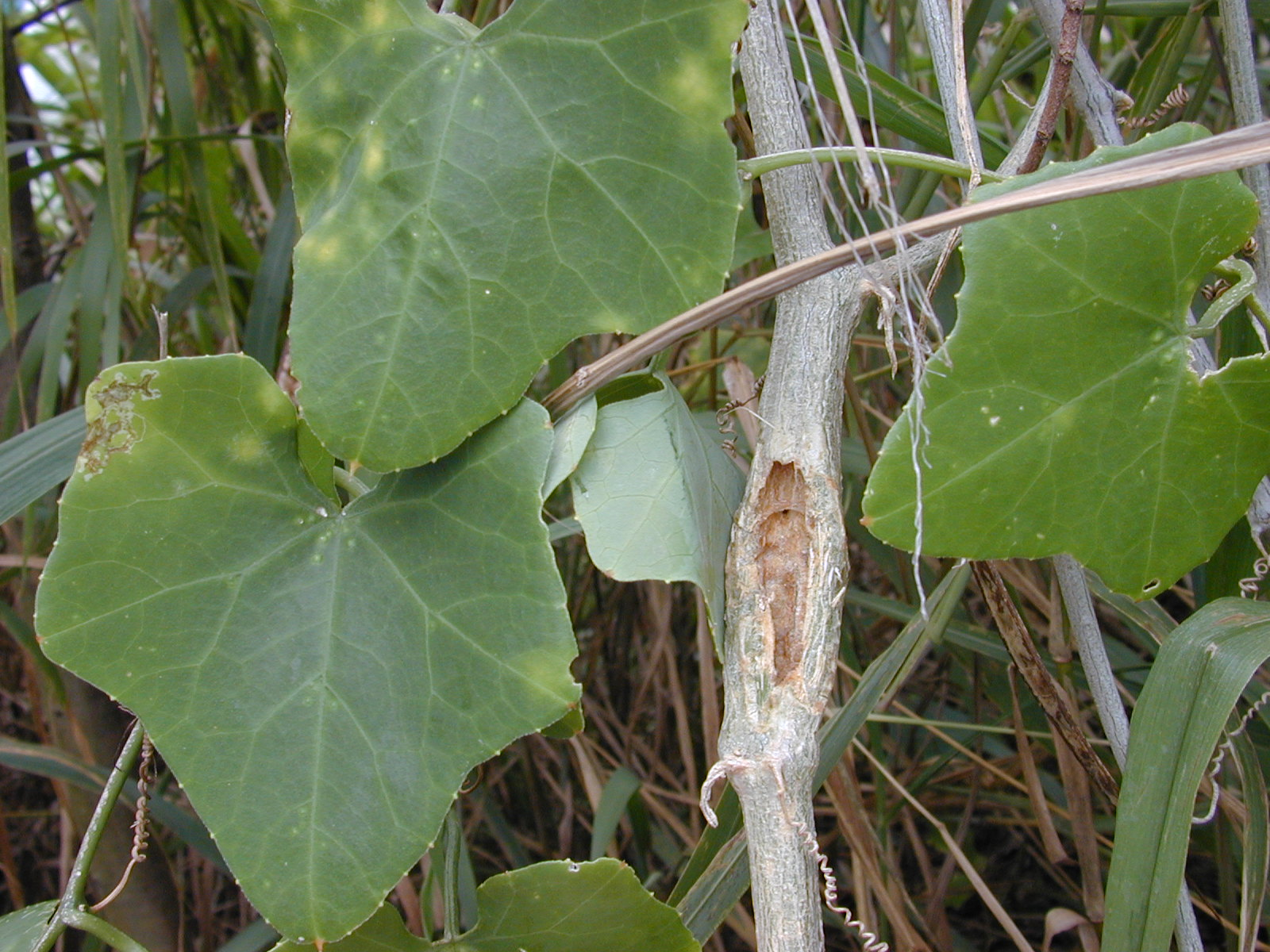
Damage

The wingspan is 10–15 mm.

The larvae feed on Coccinia grandis.
