= Akash Chaurasia =

Indian agriculturist (born 1988)

Akash Chourasiya
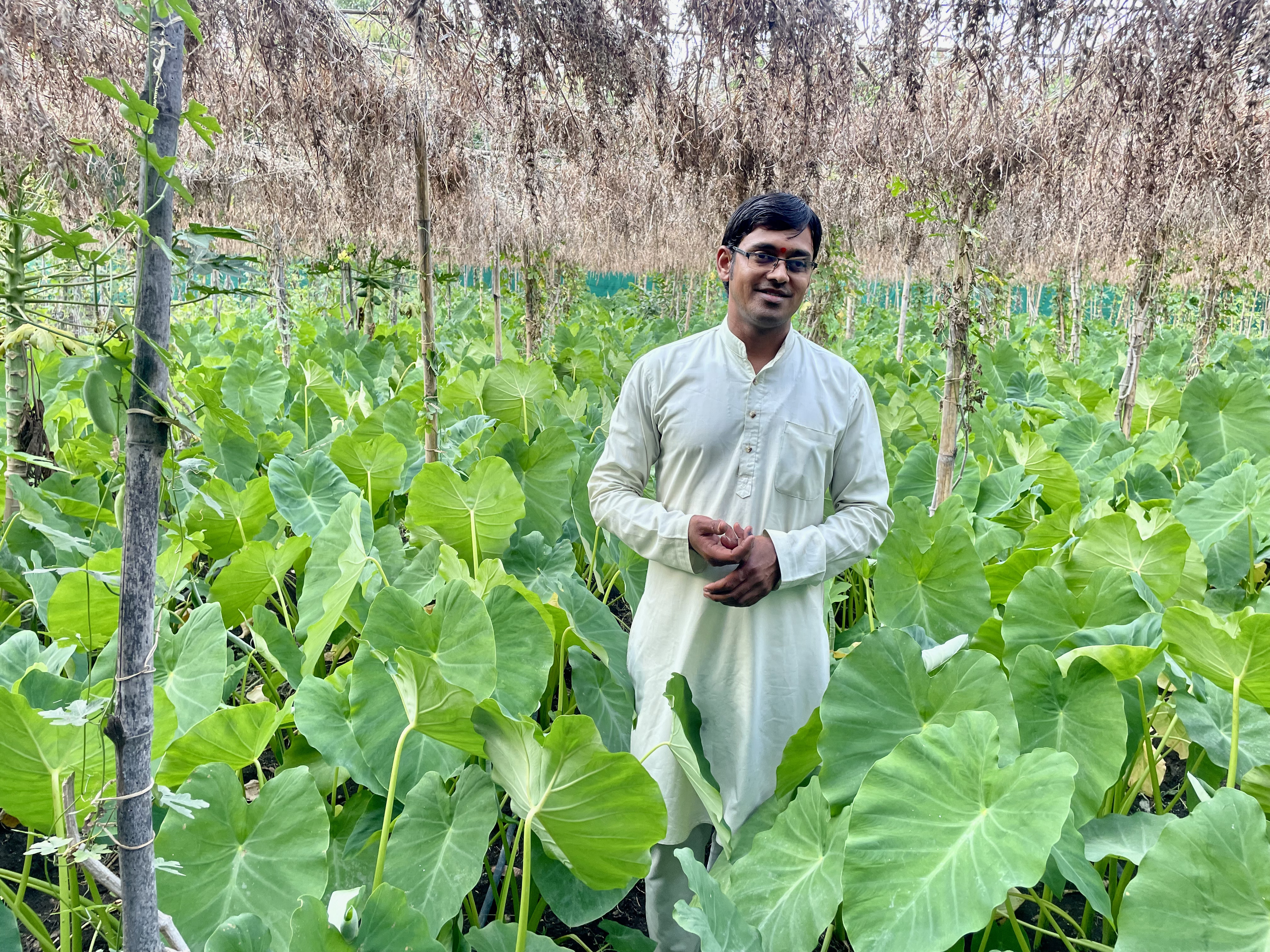
- Born: 5 July 1988 (age 38); Sagar, Madhya Pradesh
- Occupation: Farmer & Agriculturist,
- Known for: Multilayer Farming, Natural Farming
- Notable work: Multilayer Farming Innovator

Akash Chourasiya is a farmer from Sagar District in Madhya Pradesh, India. He is known for innovative farming techniques like organic agriculture and multi-layer agriculture.

== Early life ==
Akash Chourasiya initially wanted to pursue a career in medicine as a doctor but after completing high school changed direction and started farming on just ten decimal land.

== Agricultural work ==
=== Organic farming ===
Chourasiya does not use any chemical products in the agriculture. All the manures and pesticides are prepared using natural products. He prepares vermicompost to replace fertilizers using cow dungs and uses various techniques to avoid insects in the crops.

=== Multi-layer farming ===
Chourasiya invented multi-layer farm technique on his land. On one piece of land, he grows crops at multiple layers simultaneously, for example: ginger (below ground), amaranthus (at 1–2 feet above ground), ivy gourd (at 6–8 feet above ground) and papaya (at 9–10 feet above ground). This method reduces the cost and leads to higher agriculture output.

=== Farmer training ===
Chourasiya has been organising free training to interested farmers in month at his farms for many years. He has trained thousands of farmers and many of them have their own success stories.

== Awards ==
Chourasiya has been awarded by Prime Minister Narendra Modi. He has received several other national level awards such as:

- Patanjali Krishi Gaurav award
- Jindal Foundation Swayam Sidhdha award
- Krishithon award
- Mahindra smridhdhi krishi yuva (youth farmer)
- Best farmer award by Bioved institute allahabad
