= Akash, Hama =

Akash عكش
- Village
- Nickname: Akash Sarkar
- Location in Syria
- Coordinates: 35.0069°N 37.3406°E
- Country: Syria
- Governorate: Hama
- District: Salamiyah District
- Subdistrict: Barri Sharqi Subdistrict

Population (2004)
  - Total: 1,167
- Time zone: UTC+3 (AST)
- City Qrya Pcode: C3260

Akash (Arabic: عكش) is a Syrian village located in Barri Sharqi Subdistrict in Salamiyah District, Hama. According to the Syria Central Bureau of Statistics (CBS), Akash had a population of 1,167 in the 2004 census.
