= Momoka Akashi =

Japanese popular music artist

- Born: Japan
- Occupation: musician

Momoka Akashi (明石 百夏, Akashi Momoka) is a female Japanese popular music artist.

== Discography ==
=== Singles ===
- 'Showa Kissa' (3/20/1999)
- 'Tabi no Yado' (9/20/2000)

=== Albums ===
- Do za Puroretaria Dansu (8/21/1999)
