= Abu Akash =

Al-Qaeda member (died 2012)

- Born: Iraq
- Died: 2012-09-24; North Waziristan, Pakistan
- Other names: Haji Akasha Khan, Abdur Rehman, Iraqi Malang
- Military career
- Allegiance: Al-Qaeda
- Known for: Calling for attacks on coalition forces (2007), Chief of financial affairs for Al-Qaeda in the region

Abu Akash was an Al-Qaeda operative. He was believed to have been killed in a drone attack in Asori village in North Waziristan on 31 October 2008. However, he managed to escape safely. He was known by aliases Haji Akasha Khan, Abdur Rehman and Iraqi Malang. He was born in Iraq. He came to notoriety in 2007 when he released a video calling for attacks on coalition forces. Sources said Abu Akash was Al Qaeda's chief of financial affairs in the region and set up his headquarters in Mir Ali, Pakistan. One of his sons was killed in a drone attack previously on 30 November 2005. Abu Akash was killed in another drone attack on 24 September 2012.

== See also ==
- War on terror
