= Kaijin Akashi =

Japanese poet

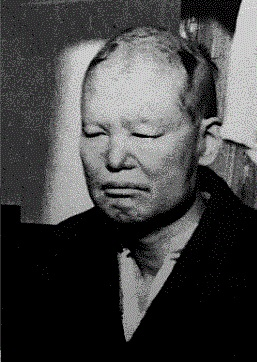
Kaijin Akashi late in life

Kaijin Akashi (Japanese: 明石 海人) was the pen name of Shōtarō Noda (野田勝太郎, 5 July 1901 – 9 June 1939), a Japanese poet whose writing was inspired by his diagnosis of leprosy and confinement to a leper colony.

== Early life ==
Akashi was born in Numazu, Shizuoka prefecture on 5 July 1901. He was the third son of a farmer. At the age of twenty, he graduated from Shizuoka Normal School with a license to teach elementary school. He worked as a teacher until 1926. In 1924, he married Asako Furugōri, also an elementary school teacher. They had two daughters, born in February 1925 and late 1926.

== Leprosy and poetry ==
Akashi began to show symptoms of leprosy in early 1926, and was diagnosed that same spring. He retired from teaching after his diagnosis and was soon subjected to the mandatory quarantine regime in practice in Japan at that time. In the following year, he was hospitalized in Akashi Rakusei hospital (明石楽生病院), which stood in what is now Nishi-ku, Kobe. When this facility closed in 1932, he was moved to the leper colony Nagashima Aiseien Sanatorium.

While at Nagashima Aiseien, Akashi learned to write traditional Japanese poetry, primarily tanka. His poems were published in the sanatorium's magazine, Aisei; and he became one of the best-known of a group of leprosy patients who wrote poetry and prose about their condition, a genre referred to as "leprosy literature" until the 1940s.

Akashi's health deteriorated as a result of his condition, and in autumn of 1936, he went blind. On 11 November 1938, he underwent a tracheotomy as a result of difficulty in breathing. On 9 June 1939, he died at the sanatorium of intestinal tuberculosis.

He published his most successful work, Hakubyō, in 1939, shortly before his death. It sold over 250,000 copies (Note: The figure of 250,000 copies is generally cited, but the collection 『海人全集』 (Kaijin zenshū) says 25,000. This much lower figure does not seem to be a typographical error.) and drew significant attention to the plight of leprosy patients in Japan. Hakubyō was a bittersweet work, exploring Akashi's grief over his condition and the loneliness that stemmed from his lengthy mandated isolation, as well as his eventual view that his condition was a gift enabling him to experience beauty and insight beyond the physical world.

== Legacy ==
Akashi's work continues to be read and studied by contemporary scholars. Inspired by Akashi's poetry, Japanese photographer Atsushi Fujiwara photographed the decaying remains of Nagashima Aiseien for his 2015 book Poet Island. Four monuments honoring Akashi were erected in his home town of Numazu in 2001.

== Books of verse by Akashi ==
- 海人遺稿 (Kaijin ikō). Tokyo: Kaizōsha, 1939. NCID BA32958162, OCLC 672684061.
  - New edition. Tokyo: Ozorasha, 1998. ISBN 475680439X.
- 白描 明石海人歌集 (Hakubyō: Akashi Kaijin kashū). Tokyo: Kaizōsha, 1939. NCID BN12555325, OCLC 674958110. (transl. A Plain Sketch; 1939)
- 明石海人全集 (Akaishi Kaijin zenshū). 2 vols. Tokyo: Kaizōsha, 1941. NCID BN11353584, OCLC 672411359.
  - New edition. Takeshi Muramatsu, et al, eds. 海人全集 (Kaijin zenshū). 3 vols. Tokyo: Koseisha, 1993. NCID BN0950746X, OCLC 51018011.
- Hiroto Uchida, ed. 明石海人全歌集 (Akaishi Kaijin zenkashū). Tokyo: Tanka-shinbun-sha, 1978. NCID BN0738216X, OCLC 673783389.
- Osamu Murai, ed. 明石海人歌集 (Akashi Kaijin kashū). Tokyo: Iwanami, 2012. ISBN 9784003119013.
