= Aakash Gandhi =

American songwriter

Aakash Gandhi is an Indian-American composer, pianist, songwriter, and entrepreneur who is currently based in Mumbai, India. He is widely known for his musical arrangements which blend piano and world elements to create largely instrumental and acoustic works. His YouTube channel, 88KeysToEuphoria, has amassed over 120 million views as of June 2020.

== Early life and education ==
Aakash was born on May 22, 1985, in Orlando, Florida. From an early age, he displayed an interest in music, learning to play his first tune on the piano at age 7. At the age of 8, he began taking private piano lessons where he was first introduced to western classical music, which he would continue to learn for the next ten years. He grew up listening to the music of Bollywood. Throughout his teenage years, He began performing at local cultural and community events in the Orlando area.

Aakash studied with honors and spent his high school years in the International Baccalaureate program. At the age of 18, he enrolled in the University of Central Florida to pursue a bachelor's degree in finance. Soon after, he attained his MBA in Finance from the same institution.

== Music career ==
=== 88KeysToEuphoria ===
Aakash gained his initial popularity through his YouTube channel, 88KeysToEuphoria, which he created in January 2008. He fast became noticed for his soulful piano and instrumental renditions, which he often performed live.

88 Keys To Euphoria soon became a collaborative powerhouse, where he used his fame to promote small and unknown music creators, beginning with flutist Sahil Khan in 2011 and vocalist Jonita Gandhi in 2012. Many of his music videos have gone viral on the web, reaching millions of views each. Amongst some of his most popular works are “Tujhe Bhula Diya on Piano,” “Pani Da Rang (Acoustic Cover),” “Tum Hi Ho (Acoustic cover),” and “Galliyan (Acoustic cover).”

Due to the growing popularity of his music, Aakash made the decision to shift to Mumbai in the fall of 2011 to pursue music full-time.

He was also invited by Google to represent his channel, 88KeysToEuphoria, at the official YouTube FanFest in Mumbai on March 1, 2014.

=== Music videos ===
Aakash has released over 132 videos on YouTube via his channel. some of his videos, including “Tum Hi Ho (Acoustic Cover),” “Suhani Raat |Chaudhvin Ka Chand (Acoustic Cover),” and “Galliyan (Acoustic Cover),” have received critical and commercial acclaim for their musical and visual appeal.

Aakash made his debut onto YouTube on January 24, 2008, with a simple piano rendition of the song “Kal Ho Na Ho.” The video was shot with a tripod and handycam in his home in Florida. His videos featured shots of primarily his hands on the keyboard, which were recorded live in one-take. He continues to record his videos in one take.

In 2012, he began investing his own money to produce professional music videos for his channel. He worked with director Devina Kanani to create videos intended to convey the mood in the music.

=== Collaborations ===
==== Online collaborations ====
Aakash has collaborated with numerous singers and musicians, featuring them in his music videos on 88 Keys To Euphoria. His most popular collaborations have been with vocalist Jonita Gandhi and flutist Sahil Khan, creating music that has since become popular. He has also featured singer Sanam Puri and guitarist Samar Puri, along with Jonita on his “Tum Hi Ho (Acoustic Cover) in May 2013. The popularity of the song caught the attention of music producer Clinton Cerejo, who invited in Sanam and Jonita for a duet in an episode of MTV's Coke Studios.

==== Sony Music collaboration ====
In May 2014, Aakash collaborated on a song with Sony Music to promote the worldwide release of Michael Jackson's 2014 album – Escape. He also appeared in the music video released by Sony Music India.

==== Original composer ====
Aakash has plans to begin releasing his original compositions through his YouTube channel.

== Music and film critic ==
From 2003 to 2009, Aakash served as Senior Writer and Managing Editor for the Bollywood web portal. He writes reviews of films and their soundtracks. In 2009 and 2010 he began freelancing as a writer for AVS TV Network. He later credited his time as a music reviewer as a major factor for his interest and appreciation for music composition.
