= Akash Banerjee =

Indian YouTuber

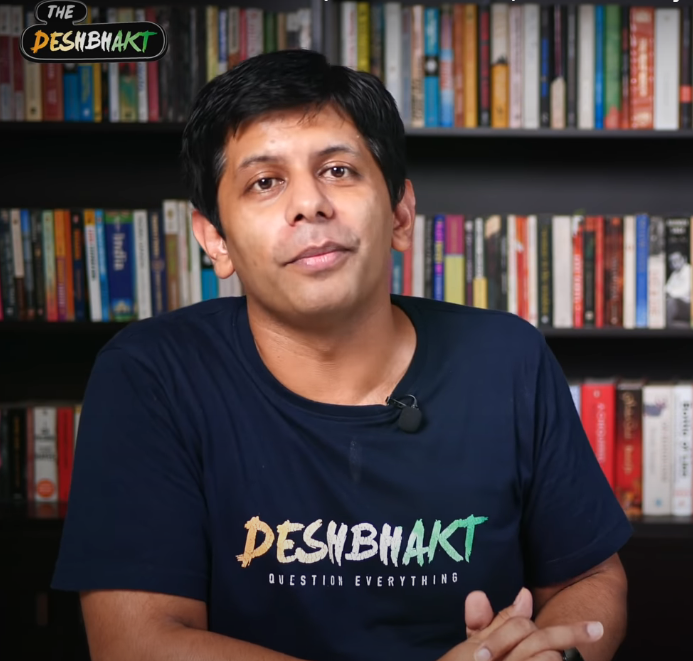
- Born: 31 March 1980 (age 46); Lucknow
- Education: La Martinière College; Hindu College (BA (Hons) in History); St. Stephens College (MA in History)
- Occupations: Radio jockey; YouTuber
- Years active: 2006–present
- Known for: Caricature Bhakt Banerji

YouTube information
- Channel: The Deshbhakt
- Genres: Politics; Satire; Interviews
- Subscribers: 6.8M million
- Views: 1.322 billion
- Last updated: 2 August 2026

Akash Banerjee (born 31 March 1980) is an Indian YouTuber, radio jockey and political satirist. He is known for his YouTube channel "The Deshbhakt" a satirical show focusing on social, political and environmental issues and his caricature "Bhakt Banerjee". As of September 2026, he has over 5 million regular viewers and over 6.87 million subscribers with over 1.44 billion total views, with The Washington Post calling Deshbhakt "one of the biggest YouTube channels in India".

== Career ==
Initially working in Radio Mirchi and Times Now, Banerjee started working in India Today as a senior correspondent covering stories like the 2008 Mumbai terror attacks and the Naxal insurgency. Disillusioned by TV journalism he moved back to Radio Mirchi where he worked till 2018.

While working in radio; Banerjee was inspired to start his YouTube channel as a satirical show mixing humour with political commentary. One of Banarjee's popular caricatures is Bhakt Banarjee who is portrayed as a fervid supporter of the BJP government and often berates the opposition and people critical of the government. Bhakt Banarjee is often seen interviewing journalists like Ravish Kumar, politicians and other YouTubers like Dhruv Rathee.

He has also authored the book "Tales from Shining India and Sinking India" in 2013 about events that took place in recent India and the inner-workings of broadcast television in India. In a review, the Sunday Guardian described it as "lacking substance" and "self-aggrandizement", while Rekhta described it as a "realistic and detailed account on how broadcast media works in the country".

== Bibliography ==
- Tales from Shining India and Sinking India (2013)

== Awards ==
- Ramnath Roenka Award 2025, The Worst of Indian TV Journalism

== See also ==
- List of Indian journalists
- List of Indian YouTubers
