= Akasha (1886) =

History
- Name: Akasha
- Owner: British Government
- Builder: Fairfield Shipbuilding and Engineering, Govan, Scotland
- Yard number: 296
- Completed: 1886
- Status: Active

General characteristics
- Type: Exploration Vessel

The SS Akasha was a paddle propelled steamship built in 1886 at Fairfield Shipbuilding and Engineering, Govan, Scotland for the British Government's Nile Expedition.
