= Tarsem Antil =

Producer/director from India

- Born: 1980 (age 45–46); Sonipat, Haryana, India
- Occupations: Producer; director

Tarsem Antil (1980) is an Indian producer and director who has worked on films, TV serials, short films, documentaries and commercials.

== Early life ==
Tarsem Antil was born in Sonipat, Haryana to a Jaat family.

== Career ==
Tarsem Antil began his career producing programmes for Doordarshan. He has produced, direct & edited more than 700 TV programmes, commercials, short films, TV serials. He started his company Harikrit Films in 2005 partnering with JV Manisha.

In 2012, Tarsem Antil directed short film Roshni Se Seencho Desh ki buniyaad and won RMAI Gold Prize for Best Short Film. In 2015 Tarsem Antil Produced To B or Not To B (2016) Hindi & English movie starring Rahul Roy, Akansha Shivhare and Trivikram Mattoo.

In 2015 he started two companies Harikrit Motion Pictures Private Limited for Feature Films & Tuner Rocks Private Limited for Music.

== Filmography ==
- Andhere Se Ujale Tak (2008)
- Pandit Sheel Bhadra Yaaje (2012)
- Roshni Se Seencho Desh ki Buniyaad (2012)
- Dhartiputra Ch. Ranbir Singh (2013)
- Vah Chaudhary (2015)
- To B or Not To B (2016)
- A Thin Line (2019)
