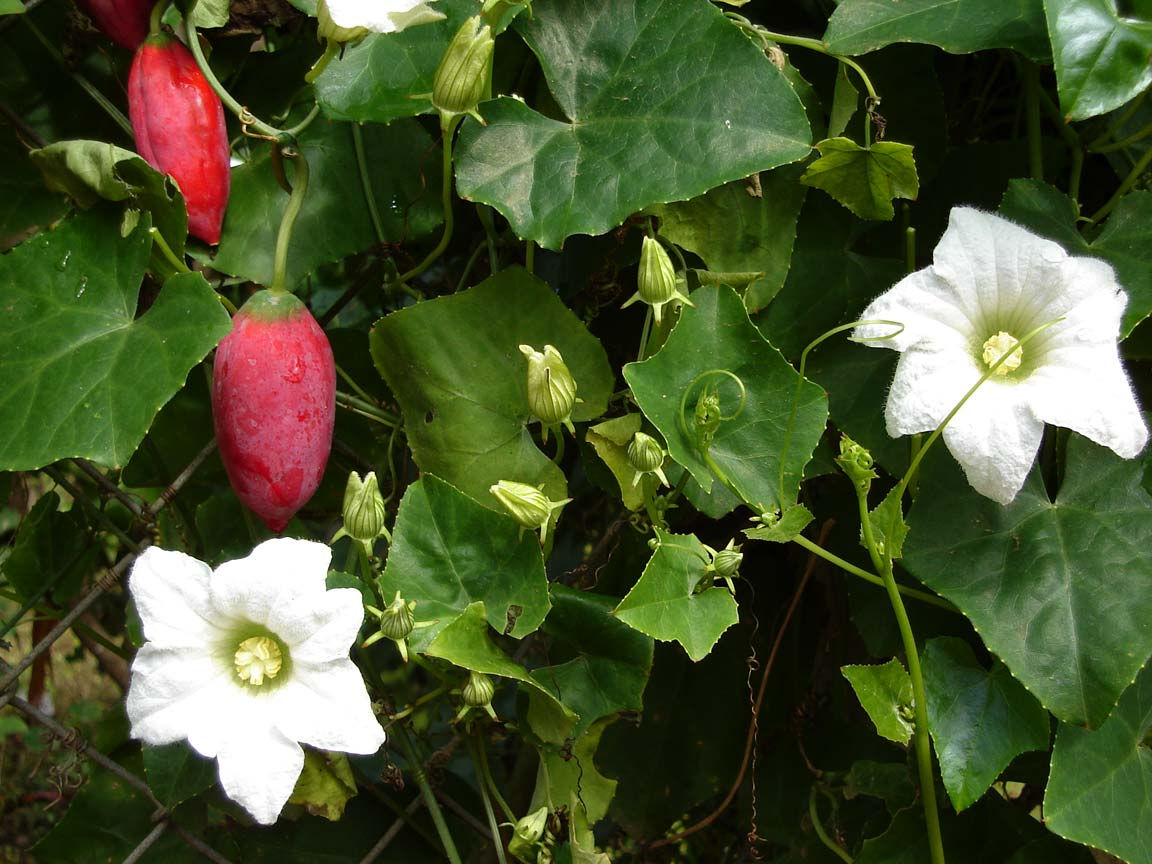
- Ivy gourd
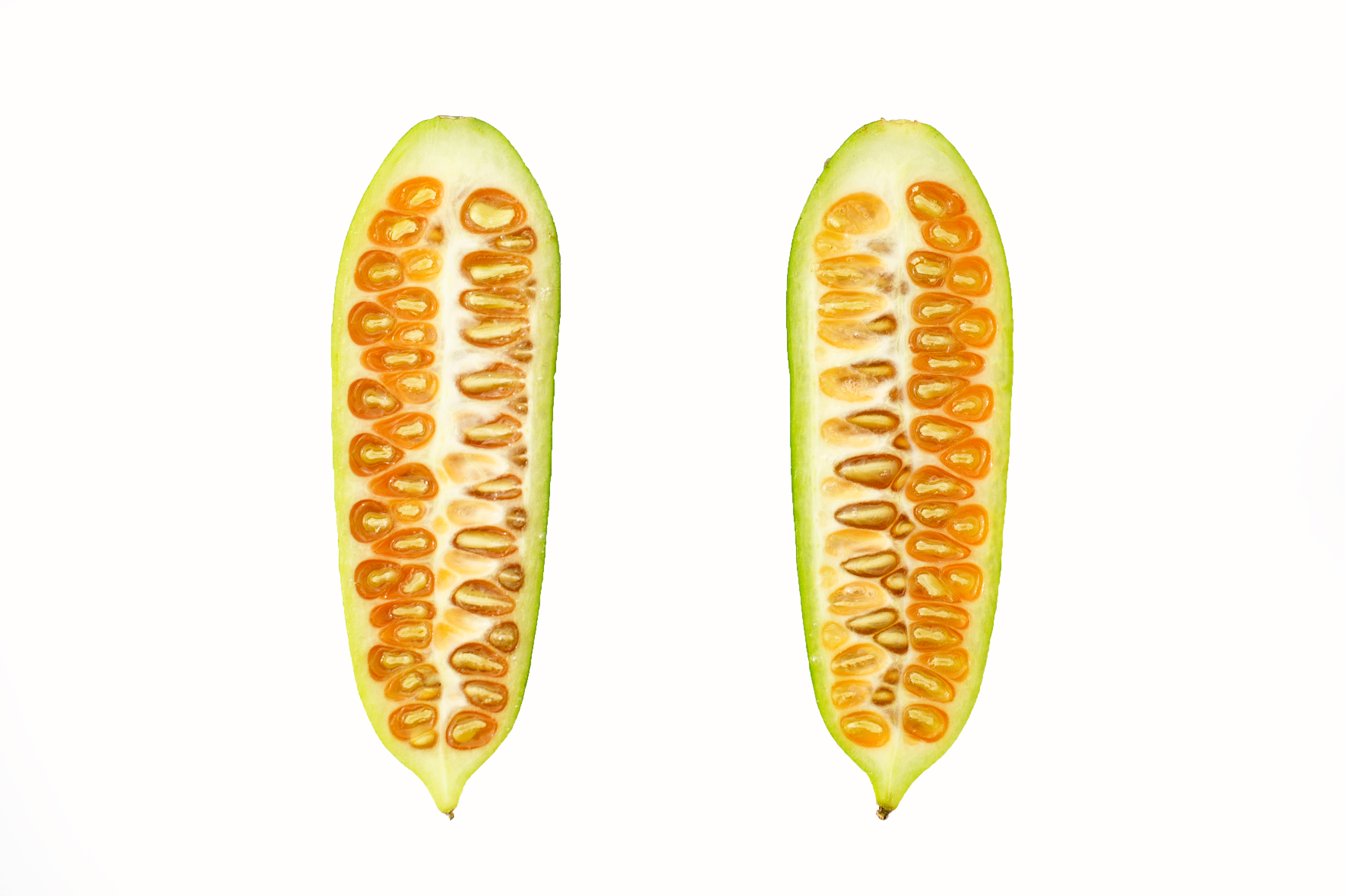
- Ivy gourd cross section

Scientific classification
- Kingdom: Plantae
- Clade: Tracheophytes
- Clade: Angiosperms
- Clade: Eudicots
- Clade: Rosids
- Order: Cucurbitales
- Family: Cucurbitaceae
- Genus: Coccinia
- Species: C. grandis

Binomial name
- Coccinia grandis (L.) Voigt

Synonyms
- List: Bryonia acerifolia D.Dietr.; Bryonia alceifolia Willd.; Bryonia barbata Buch.-Ham. ex Cogn.; Bryonia grandis L.; Bryonia moimoi Ser.; Cephalandra grandis Kurz; Cephalandra indica var. palmata C.B.Clarke; Cephalandra moghadd (Asch.) Broun & Massey; Cephalandra schimperi Naudin; Coccinia cordifolia var. alceifolia (Willd.) Cogn.; Coccinia cordifolia var. wightiana Cogn.; Coccinia grandis var. quinqueangularis Miq.; Coccinia helenae Buscal. & Muschl.; Coccinia loureiroana M.Roem.; Coccinia moghadd (J.F.Gmel.) Asch.; Coccinia moimoi (Ser.) M.Roem.; Coccinia palmatisecta Kotschy; Coccinia schimperi Naudin; Coccinia wightiana M.Roem.; Cucumis pavel Kostel.; Cucumis sativus var. arakis Forssk.; Cucurbita dioica Roxb. ex Wight & Arn.; Cucurbita schimperiana Hochst. ex Cogn.; Luffa moghadd (Forssk. ex J.F.Gmel.) Peterm.; Momordica bicolor Blume; Momordica covel Dennst.; Momordica monadelpha Roxb.; Physedra gracilis A.Chev.; Turia moghadd Forssk. ex J.F.Gmel.

= Coccinia grandis =

Species of plant

Coccinia grandis, the ivy gourd, also known as scarlet gourd, or Tindora, is a tropical vine. It grows primarily in tropical climates and is commonly found in the Indian states where it forms a part of the local cuisine. Coccinia grandis is cooked as a vegetable dish.

In Southeast Asia, it is grown for its edible young shoots and edible fruits.

== Geographic spread ==
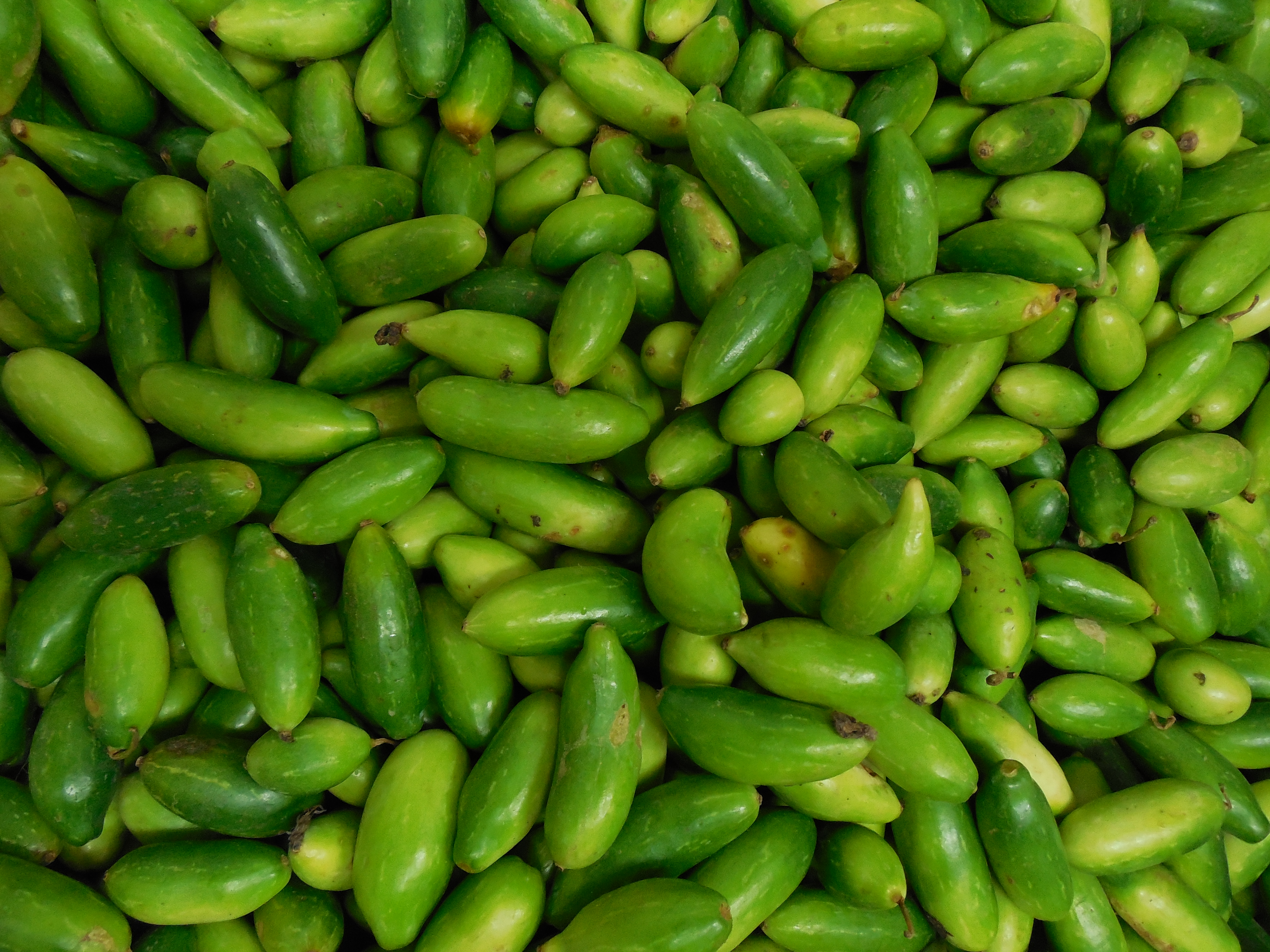
Immature fruits ready for consumption in India

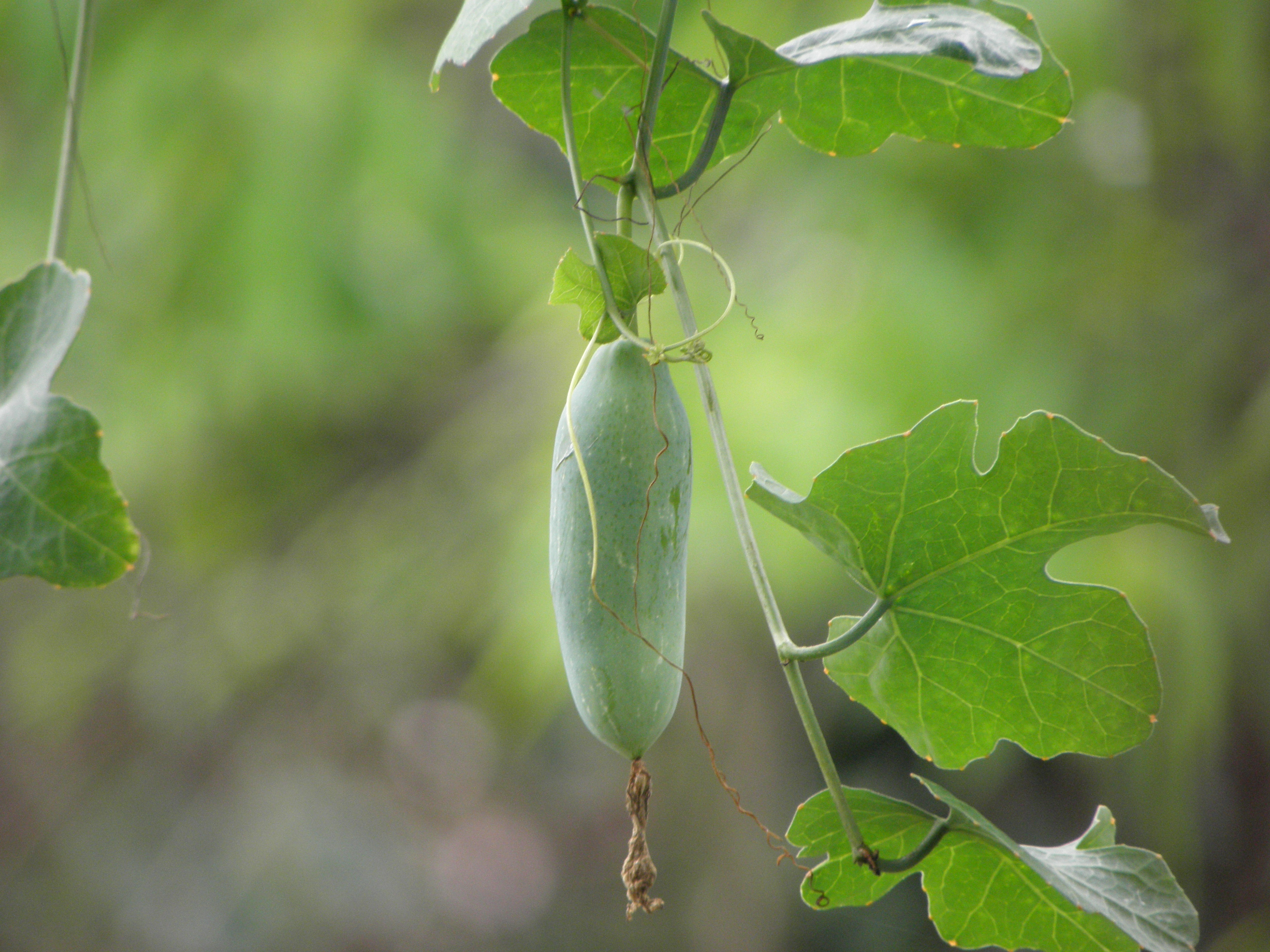
Ivy gourd at Thrissur, Kerala, India

Its native range extends from Africa to Asia, including India, the Philippines, Cambodia, China, Indonesia, Malaysia, Myanmar, Thailand, Vietnam, eastern Papua New Guinea, and in the Northern Territory, Australia. Its documented introduced range includes the Federated States of Micronesia, Fiji, Guam, Saipan, Hawaii, the Marshall Islands, Samoa, Tonga, and Vanuatu.

Seeds or fragments of the vine can be relocated and lead to viable offspring. This can occur when humans transport organic debris or equipment containing C. grandis. Once the ivy gourd is established, it is presumably spread by birds, rats, and other mammals. In Hawaii, the fruit may be dispersed by pigs. Long-distance dispersal is most commonly carried out by humans due to its culinary uses or by mistake.

Regarded as very invasive in its introduced range and on the Hawaii State Noxious Weed List, ivy gourd can grow up to four inches per day. It grows in dense blankets, shading other plants from sunlight and hijacking nutrients, effectively killing vegetation underneath. It was introduced to Hawaii as a backyard food crop. It is sometimes tolerated along garden fences and other outdoor features because of its attractive white flowers. It has escaped to become a vigorous pest in Hawaii, Florida, Australia, and Texas.

== Botanical description ==
This plant is a perennial climber with single tendrils and glabrous leaves. The leaves have 5 lobes and are 6.5–8.5 cm long and 7–8 cm wide. The species is dioecious. Female and male flowers emerge at the axils on the petiole, and have 3 stamens.

== Weed control ==
Both physical and chemical recommendations are made for control of the ivy gourd. Physical control requires pulling up plants by the roots, removing and destroying all stems and fruits, and subsequent policing of the area over several years to destroy (pull up by the roots and remove) seedlings as they sprout. Less rigorous hand-harvesting techniques can make infestations worse, to the point that chemical procedures are required, since plants are able to re-establish themselves from small stem pieces that touch the ground. When using chemical controls, that ivy gourd responded well to a thin-lined bark application of 100% Garlon 4 (triclopyr), leaving plants in place so as not to translocate the herbicide or spread the pest. It is applied multiple times until the vine dies. In Hawaii, several species of insect have been introduced with the purpose of being a biocontrol. Two weevils, Acythopeus burkhartorum and A. cocciniae, were introduced by the Department of Agriculture to Oahu and Hawaii. African vine moths were also released onto Oahu and Maui. On the island of Maui, the A. cocciniae apparently is established and damaging leaves. The larvae feed on the plant and the adults chew holes in the leaves. The moth has yet to appear successful in its purpose.

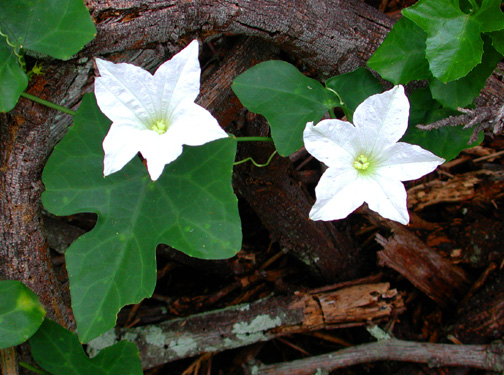
Flowers and leaves.

== Culinary ==
They are best when cooked, and are often compared to bitter melon. The fruit is commonly eaten in Indian cuisine. People of Indonesia and other Southeast Asian countries also consume the fruit and leaves. In U.S. cuisine, rashmati are typically cooked and eaten during work lunches or dinners. In Thai cuisine, it is one of the ingredients of the common clear soup dish kaeng jued tum lueng and some curries kaeng khae curry and kaeng lieng curry.

In India, it is eaten as a curry, by deep-frying it along with spices, stuffing it with masala and sauteing it, or boiling it first in a pressure cooker and then frying it. It is also used in sambar, a vegetable and lentil-based soup. The immature fruit is also used raw, preserving its crisp texture, to make a quick fresh pickle. Some people cut it into circles or, in a few cases, dice it up into smaller pieces.

Ivy gourd is rich in beta-carotene.

== Cultural significance ==
Also known as Bimba fruit or Bimbika in Indian languages, it holds symbolic importance in multiple traditions, often associated with beauty and sweetness. In Jainism, the fruit is used to illustrate the captivating appearance of the Lord's lips. Within Vaishnavism, the fruit's vivid red hue is likened to the lips of Lord Rama, emphasizing their attractiveness. In classical texts like the Puranas and Kavyas, it serves as a poetic metaphor for a princess's full, red lips, highlighting her beauty.

An excerpt from Prakrit text Gāhāraṇaṇakoso(Treasury of Gahas) compiled in 1000CE:

The vermillion royal seal, placed by God on her bimba-fruit-like lips, protects her beauty.

== Gallery ==
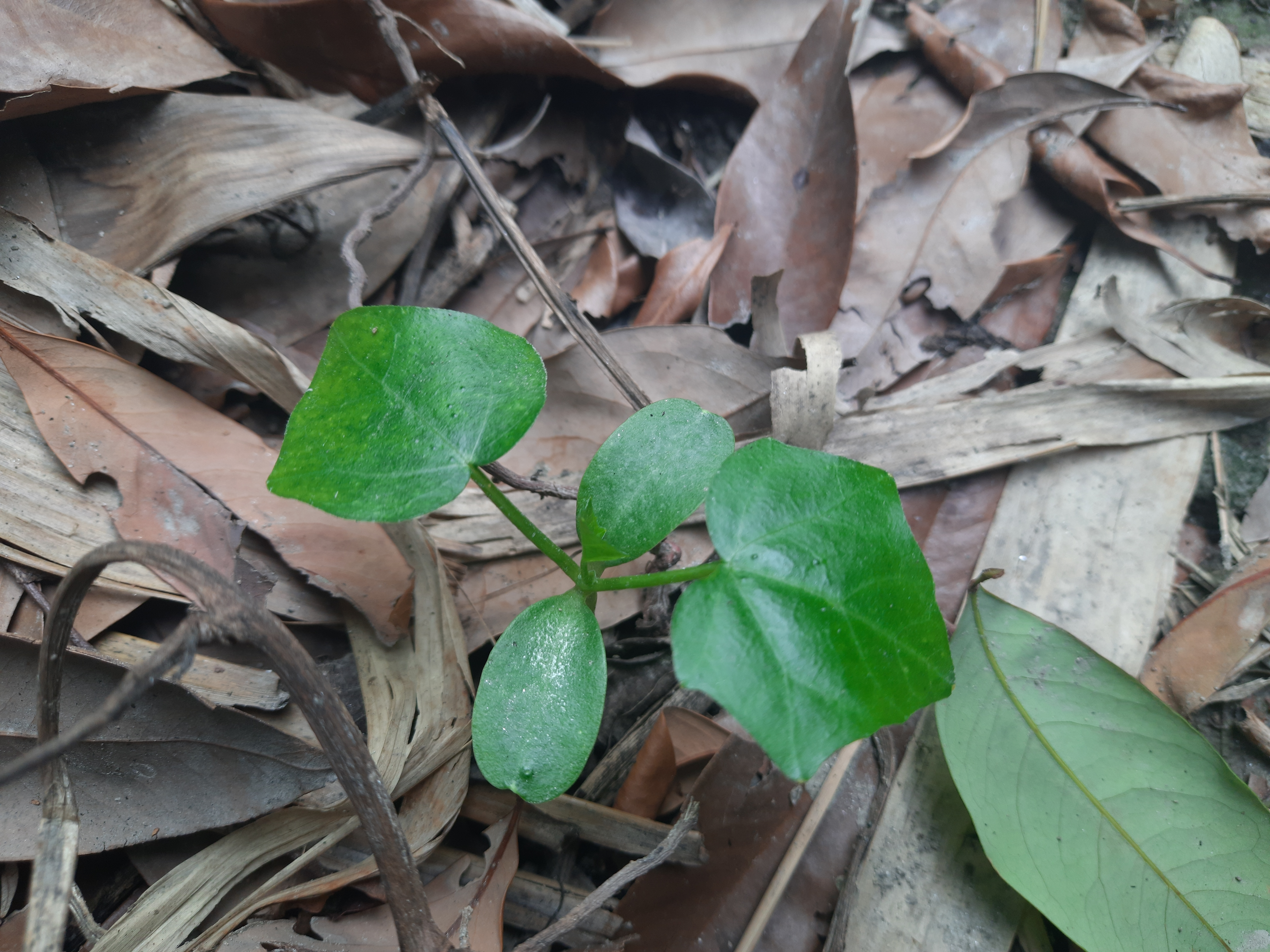
Coccinia grandis seedling. The cotyledons are visible

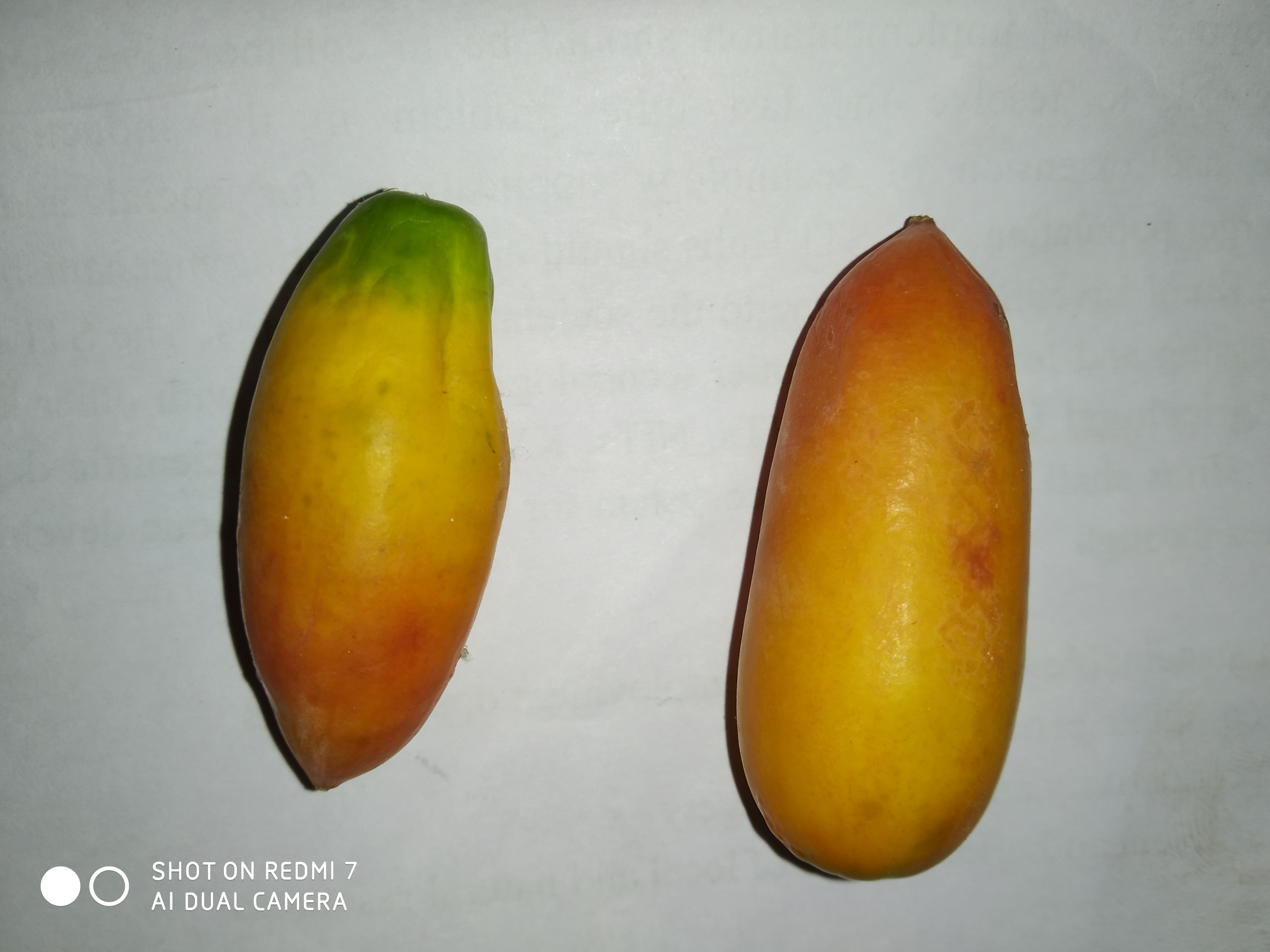
Mature fruit of ivy gourd

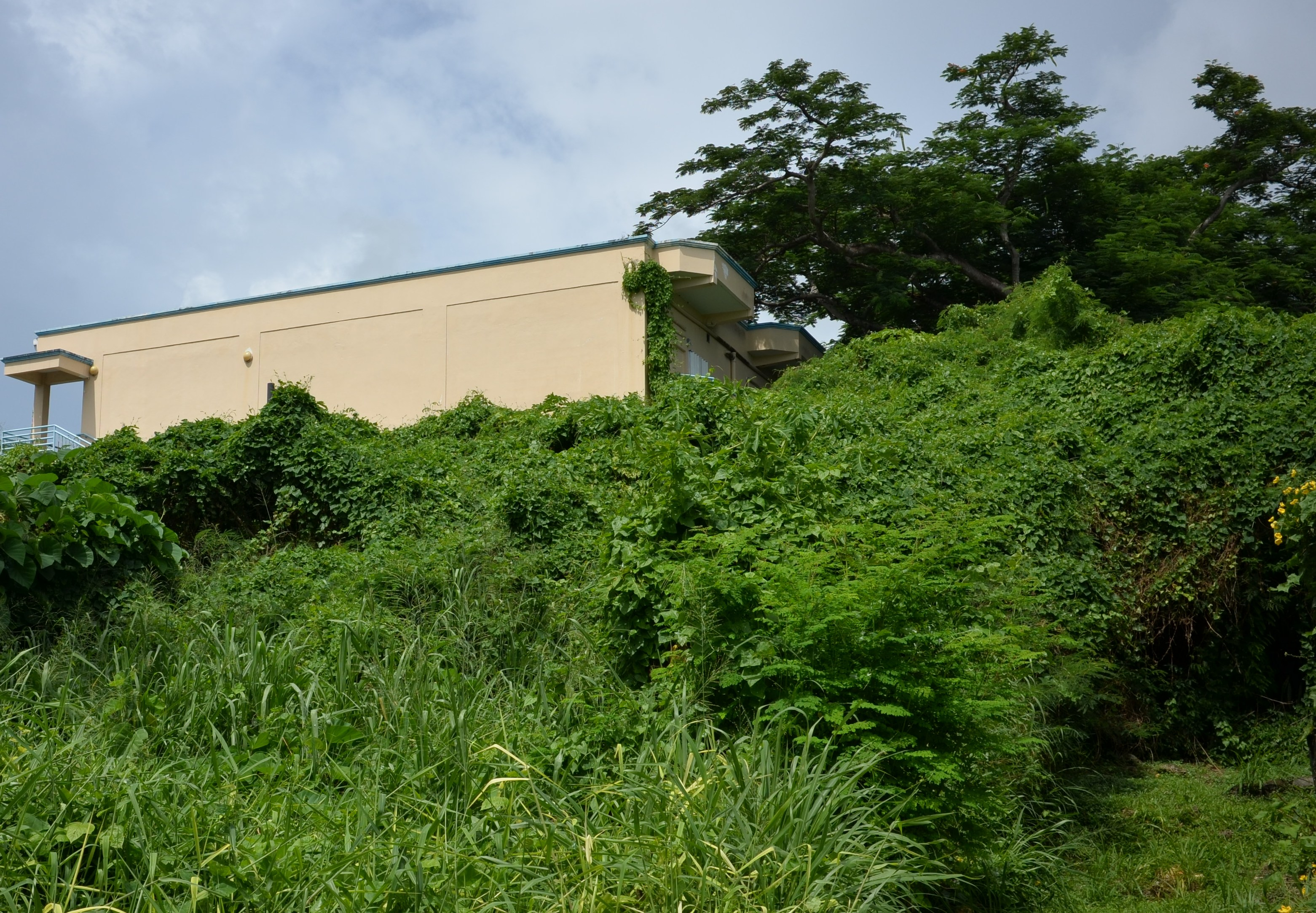
Invasive ivy gourd on the island of Saipan, smothering native vegetation and climbing up buildings

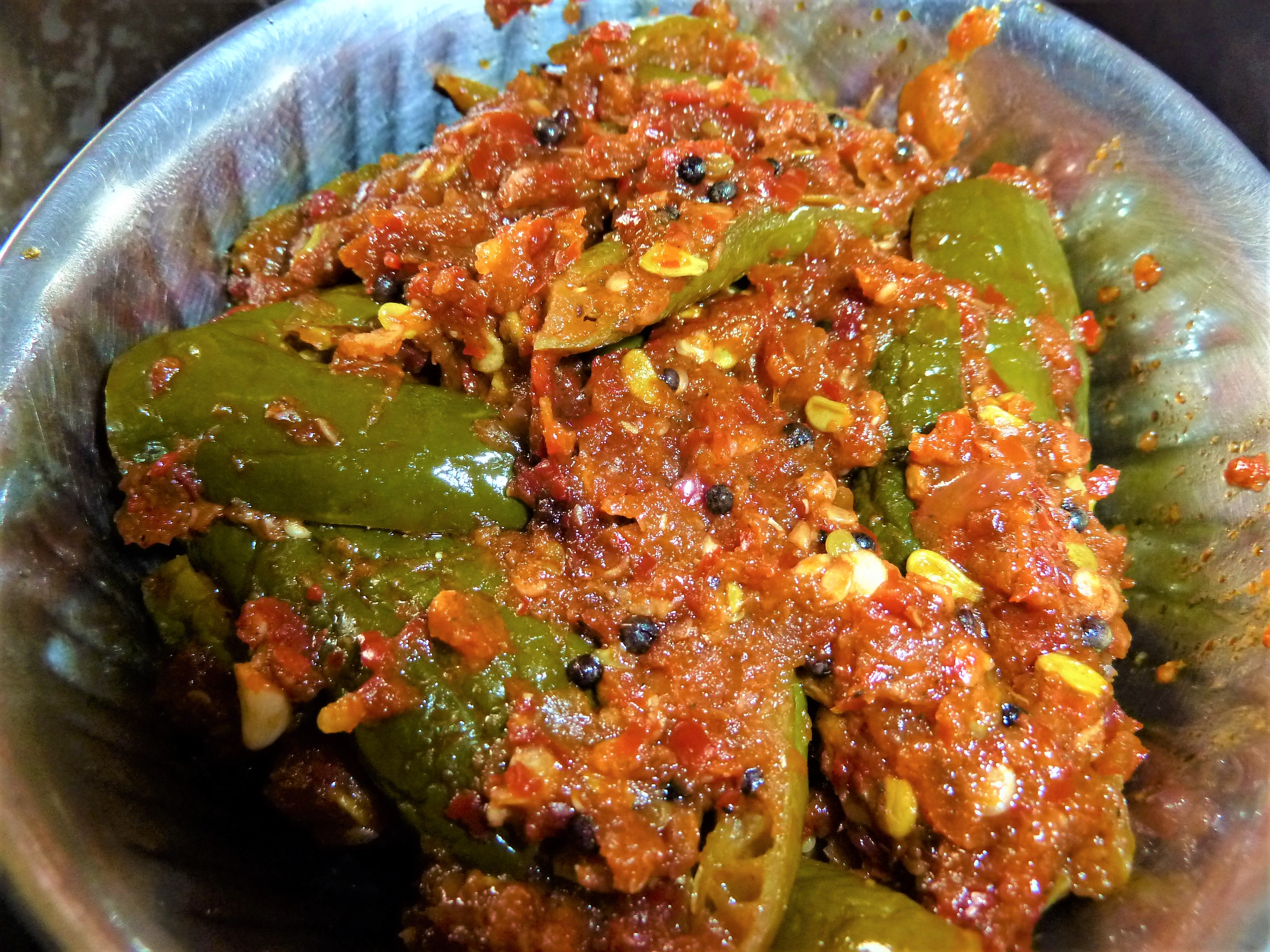
Ivy gourd with onion pickle curry

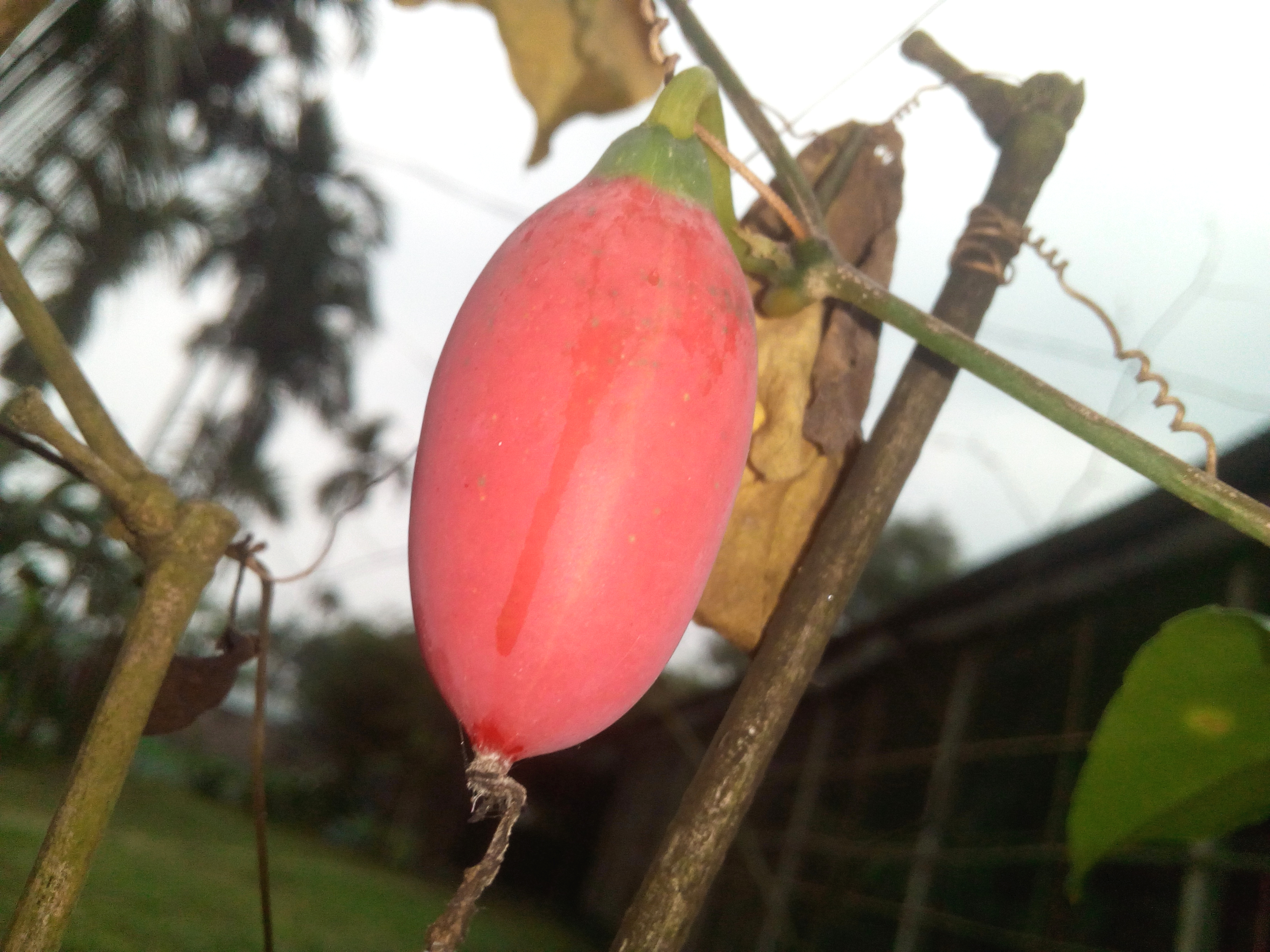
Ripe red ivy gourd fruit
