= Akash Singh (cricketer, born 1995) =

Indian cricketer (born 1995)

Personal information
- Full name: Akash Singh
- Born: 20 December 1995 (age 30); Itanagar, Arunachal Pradesh
- Source: ESPNcricinfo, 1 November 2018

Akash Singh (born 20 December 1995) is an Indian cricketer. He made his first-class debut for Arunachal Pradesh in the 2018–19 Ranji Trophy on 1 November 2018. He made his List A debut on 8 December 2021, for Arunachal Pradesh in the 2021–22 Vijay Hazare Trophy.
