= Akash Antil =

Indian discus thrower

Akash Antil (born 1991) is an Indian track and field athlete competing in the discus throw. He won the silver medal at the 2007 South Asian Junior Athletics Championships. He failed a doping test at the 2010 Indian National Games and was banned from competition.
