= One Step Away (song) =

Song by Madonna

from the album Confessions II
- Released: July 3, 2026
- Studio: Start Here (London); Republic Studios (New York City)
- Genre: Dance-pop; trance; EDM; deep house; nu-disco
- Length: 4:23
- Label: Warner
- Songwriters: Madonna; Stuart Price
- Producers: Madonna; Stuart Price

"One Step Away" is a song by American singer-songwriter Madonna from her fifteenth studio album, Confessions II (2026). She wrote and produced it alongside British producer Stuart Price, and the song became available as the album's second track on July 3, 2026, by Warner Records. A dance-pop tune that blends deep house, nu-disco, EDM, and trance, the song is a manifesto of the healing power of dance music. "One Step Away" received positive reviews from music critics and was also included on the musical short film Confessions II (2026).

== Background and release ==
In 2005, Madonna released her tenth studio album Confessions on a Dance Floor, produced by Stuart Price, to critical and commercial success. In September 2024, Madonna announced on her Instagram account that she was working on new music with Price. The following February, she confirmed that her new music was a follow-up to Confessions on a Dance Floor and teased its release in 2025. She continued to document the recording sessions on social media, posting pictures in the studio with Price throughout 2025. In September 2025, she announced a reunion with her original record label of over 25 years, Warner Records, with the album slated for release in 2026. Madonna officially announced Confessions II on April 15, 2026, and its tracklist on May 14, revealing "One Step Away" as the second song on the tracklist. Warner Records released the song along with the rest of the album for digital download and streaming on July 3.

"One Step Away", alongside the five other first tracks on Confessions II, is featured on the musical short film of the album, directed by TORSO (David Toro and Solomon Chase) and premiered during the Tribeca Festival on June 5, 2026. In the song's segment, Madonna is shown behind a rain-covered window while the scene alternates with footage of her driving recklessly on a highway. The segment ends with her crashing into a barrier and leaving a red lipstick mark on the airbag.

== Composition ==
"One Step Away" was written and produced by Madonna and Stuart Price, with engineering and mixing handled by Price at Republic Studios in New York City and Start Here in London. Musically, the track is a rousing dance-pop composition that blends deep house, nu-disco, EDM, and trance-like elements. Built upon a throbbing percussion, a low-simmering bassline, and gently chugging basement rhythms, the arrangement features understated, plaintive piano flourishes alongside soulful string arrangements and tropospheric synth washes. Critics compared its lush sonic texture to the work of deep house producer Mr. Fingers, as well as Mondo Grosso's 2017 single "Labyrinth".

The track opens with a breathy spoken word voiceover that establishes the conceptual manifesto for Confessions II: "People think that dance music is superficial / But they've got it all wrong / The dance floor is not just a place / It's a threshold / A ritualistic space where movement / Replaces language." Lyrically, "One Step Away" frames the dancefloor as a transformative, ritualistic space for emotional recovery and spiritual liberation. Madonna delivers contemplative lines addressing personal healing and catharsis ("Understand your violence / And the trauma you've survived / Nobody's free until they're broken"), which The New York Times noted felt "tailor made for recovery communities." Throughout the song, she offers a message of hope and salvation, emphasizing that freedom is accessible to everyone ("One step away from your freedom / One breath away from the dance of life").

== Critical reception ==
Joe Lynch, for Billboard, named "One Step Away" the ninth best song on Confessions II.

== Credits and personnel ==
The credits are adapted from Madonna's official website.

- Madonna – vocals, songwriting, producer
- Stuart Price – songwriting, producer, keyboards, bass, programming, string arrangement, engineering, mixing
- Gloria Colston – assistant engineering
- Jagger Price – assistant mixing
- Ruairi O'Flaherty – mastering
- Miles Showell – vinyl master cut

Recorded at Republic Studios (New York City). Mixed at Start Here (London). Mastered at Sterling Sound (Los Angeles). Vinyl master cut at Abbey Road Studios (London).

== Charts ==
Chart performance
Chart (2026)	Peak position
New Zealand Hot Singles (RMNZ)	7
