= I Feel So Free =

2026 song by Madonna

- Peggy Gou energy mix cover

Promotional single by Madonna

from the album Confessions II
- Released: April 17, 2026
- Studio: Bentley House (New York City); Start Here (London)
- Genre: EDM; deep house; techno; post-disco
- Length: 5:03
- Label: Warner
- Songwriters: Madonna; Stuart Price; Marvin Burns
- Producers: Madonna; Stuart Price

Visualizer
- "I Feel So Free" on YouTube

"I Feel So Free" is a song by the American singer Madonna from her fifteenth studio album, Confessions II (2026). Warner Records released it as a promotional single on April 17, 2026, and an energy mix by Peggy Gou was released as a single on May 15. Madonna wrote and produced the song alongside the British electronic musician Stuart Price, with Lil Louis (Marvin Burns) receiving songwriting credits for the sample for his song "French Kiss" (1989) and the Venezuelan musician Arca receiving credits as an additional producer. An EDM and deep house song compared to the work of Lil Louis and Donna Summer, its lyrics contains Madonna uttering a soliloquy about creating a new persona on the dancefloor. It was nominated for Best Dance/Electronic Recording at the 69th Annual Grammy Awards.

== Writing and recording ==
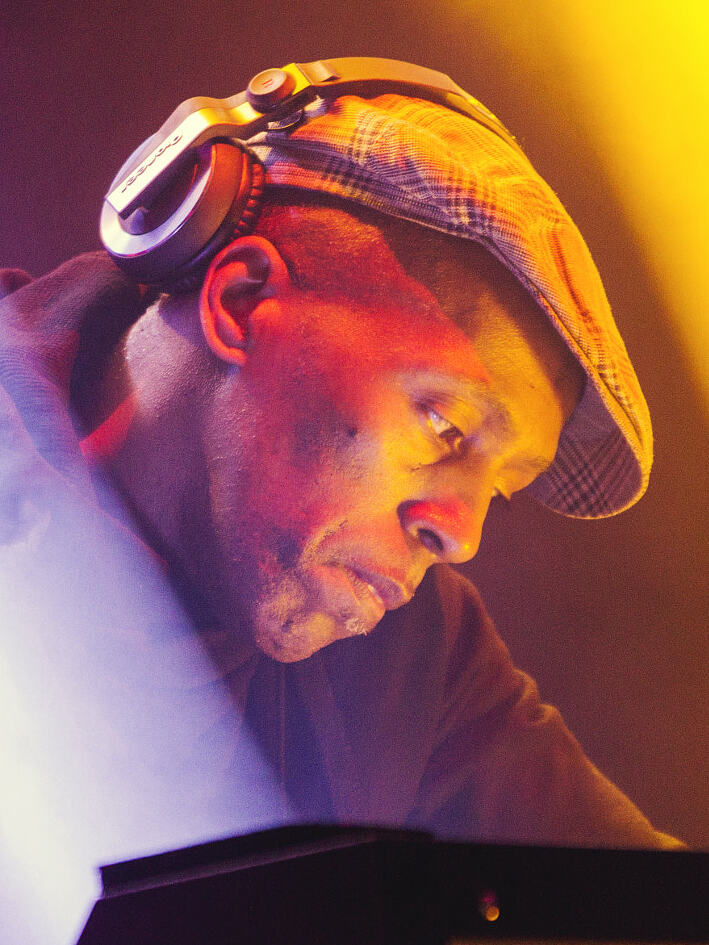
Lil Louis, whose song "French Kiss" (1989) was sampled in "I Feel So Free"

"I Feel So Free" was written and produced by Madonna and Stuart Price, along with additional production by Arca. It was the first song recorded for the album, and developed at Bentley Studios in Spanish Harlem, New York City, from an instrumental originally created in London using analog equipment to produce hypnotic grooves. Madonna came up with the idea for a spoken intro, incorporating spoken-word vocals sampled from her 2021 interview for V.

One day she brought Lil Louis' house song "French Kiss" (1989) to the studio with the idea to incorporate it into the song, sampling the part when Lil Louis says "Oh, by the way, it all started like this." Madonna combined elements of "French Kiss" with the existing instrumental before spontaneously recording vocals inspired by her feelings about dance music and the dance floor as a place of sanctuary.

Madonna revealed that the song was inspired by the feeling that on the dancefloor "you're with a lot of people and you don't feel judged, you can hide." She further explained the meaning of the song,

"I can be whoever I want to be." That's why I start the record that way. "Thanks for coming." It's a little confessional moment, revealing how hard it is to trust people. I never know why people like me. It's hard to understand my place in the world, but out here on the dance floor, I feel so free. I think that's true for a lot of people. It's welcoming people back to that state of mind because everybody's worried. It's a big thing.

== Release and promotion ==
Madonna previewed "I Feel So Free" in a 60-second video on April 15, 2026, when announcing her album Confessions II would follow that July. She also confirmed it would serve as the album's opening track. The full song premiered on iHeartRadio's Pride Radio on April 17, 2026, where it was set to play at the top of every hour for the rest of this weekend, and was serviced to a select few DJs and clubs. Subsequently, it was released on all streaming platforms via Warner Records the following day, along with the visualizer. Billboard confirmed that it will not serve as the album's lead single, but is rather a first taste of the project. A remix by South Korean DJ Peggy Gou was released on May 15, 2026.

The song was included in Madonna's musical short film Confessions II, directed by TORSO and serving as the visual companion of the album. It premiered on June 5, 2026, on the Tribeca Festival, and was released on YouTube three days later.

== Composition ==
"I Feel So Free"
A sample of the song featuring the spoken verse and sung chorus, with lyrics about dance-floor escapism.

"I Feel So Free" is an EDM, deep house, techno and post-disco song, in which Madonna is "half-singing, half-whispering" and "uttering a soliloquy over the top." It opens with "spacey strings, rumbling sub-bass, and bone-dry snare hits". According to The Guardian's Alexis Petridis, "It's devoid both of anything you might reasonably call a chorus – it's structured in the slowly building manner of an underground dance track rather than a pop song". He also recalled "a subtle acid line that emerges about four minutes in." Bilboard's Joe Lynch pointed out "sensual whisper atop an arpeggiated volley of retro synths and soothing soundscapes." The Independent's Roisin O'Connor described the song as "a swell of synths".

The lyrics refer to the dance floor and creating "a new persona", with Madonna proclaiming "that the only place she can truly be herself is in the anonymity of a crowded disco." Lynch interpreted it as a description of a loss of confidence, in which the dance floor is presented as "a place of escape, release and self-actualization." Hattie Lindert of Pitchfork deemed it a "house ode to dancing in a crowd." The Wall Street Journal's Mark Richardson interpreted it as the "thesis statement, framing the club as a place that dissolves ego, lessens anxiety, and offers a portal to communal bliss". Jeff Nelson from People called it a "hymn consecrating clubs and the comfort, community and escapism they can provide". Sam Rosenberg of Paste felt that in the song Madonna was a "wise, all-knowing club-kid sage and encouraging us to go to the club with a trusted group of people". Her vocals were described as "lusty", "hypnotic", "airy", "with the irresistible iciness" and with "an intimate, breathy tone". Evelyn McDonnell of The New York Times felt that she created "a vocal echo chamber".

It was described as a homage to Lil Louis' house song "French Kiss" (1989), which it samples. The title is a reference to Madonna's 1985 song "Into the Groove". Additionally, it received comparisons to Donna Summer's songs "Love to Love You Baby" (1975) and "I Feel Love" (1977), as well as Madonna's 2005 song "Future Lovers" (from Confessions on a Dance Floor), with Lynch adding that it "exists within the continued sonic realm of Confessions on a Dance Floor." Ed Powers of The Daily Telegraph deemed it a tribute to the 1970s music and a "searing love letter to Studio 54-style dance-floor escapism".

== Critical reception ==
Bilboard's Joe Lynch opined that "Madonna continues to make the case for pop music as a means of self-expression and spiritual fortification." Alexis Petridis of The Guardian deemed it "subtly appealing, exceptionally well made, very obviously the work of people who genuinely understand and love house music". He added that "it sounds like Madonna being herself, rather than trying to chase whatever current pop trend has caught her eye and absorb it into her sound." Ed Powers of The Daily Telegraph called it "an old-school banger", adding that it "barely lets up across its near five-minute runtime". Tom Breihan of Stereogum opined that the lyrics about achieving personal liberation "might sound generic if anyone else sang it, but Madonna's voice still has a ton of presence." Mark Savage from BBC News and Jeff Nelson of People called it "hypnotic".

Lucy O'Brien of Mojo opined out that the song accentuates "Madonna's shamanic female energy". The Independent's Roisin O'Connor compared it to "the opening of a door into a dark, heady underground". The Irish Times's Ed Power called it "an effective if unoriginal Giorgio Moroder pastiche". Sal Cinquemani of Slant Magazine gave a mixed review, called the song "utterly sublime" and "sublimely euphoric, nostalgic beast". However, he deemed it "reductive", adding that "Madonna chirps in a nod to at least half a dozen of her own hits". Spencer Kornhaber of The Atlantic felt that "the expected blastoff into ecstasy doesn't quite arrive".

In June 2026, Billboard staff placed it on the 14th place of their raking of the best songs of 2026 so far.

== Commercial performance ==
In the United States, "I Feel So Free" debuted at number 14 on the Dance/Mix Show Airplay, the fifth highest debut on this chart in the 2020s. In its fifth week, the song ascended to the top position on the chart, becoming Madonna's first number-one hit on a Billboard radio chart in 18 years, since "Miles Away" (2008). It also debuted at number one on the Dance Digital Song Sales chart, number six on the all-genre Digital Song Sales, and number 12 on the Hot Dance/Pop Songs. In the United Kingdom, "I Feel So Free" debuted at number 90 on the UK Singles Chart, making it her fifth consecutive decade with a solo song on the chart. It also entered at number 18 on the UK Singles Sales Chart and at number two on the UK Singles Downloads Chart.

== Accolades ==
Awards and nominations
Award	Date	Category	Result	Ref.
Grammy Awards	February 7, 2027	Best Dance/Electronic Recording	Pending	

== Live performance ==
On June 4, 2026, Madonna performed the song during the surprise, free Pride Month concert at The Square in Times Square, produced and live streamed by Grindr.

== Formats and track listings ==
Digital download / streaming
No.	Title	Length
1.	"I Feel So Free"	4:59
Total length:		4:59

Digital download / streaming (Peggy Gou Energy Mix)
No.	Title	Length
1.	"I Feel So Free" (Peggy Gou Energy Mix)	4:27
Total length:		4:27

== Credits and personnel ==
The credits are adapted from Madonna's official website and Tidal.

- Madonna – lead vocals, songwriting, producer, background vocals
- Stuart Price – songwriting, producer, programming, keyboards, bass, drum, strings, engineering, mixing
- Lil Louis – songwriting, additional vocals
- Arca – additional producer, programming, keyboards
- Henry Elkind – engineering assistance
- Jeremy Brown – engineering assistance
- Theo Rogers – second engineering assistance
- Varun Jhunjhunwalla – second engineering assistance
- Luke Volkert – second engineering assistance
- Jagger Price – mixing assistance
- Ruairi O'Flaherty – mastering
- Miles Showell – vinyl master cut

Recorded at Bentley House Studios (New York City) and Start Here (London). Mixed at Start Here (London). Mastered at Sterling Sound (Los Angeles). Vinyl master cut at Abbey Road Studios (London).

== Charts ==
Chart performance
Chart (2026)	Peak position
Argentina Anglo Airplay (Monitor Latino)	10
Australia Club Tracks (ARIA)	9
Costa Rica Anglo Airplay (Monitor Latino)	15
Croatia International Airplay (Top lista)	44
Global Dance Radio (Billboard/WARM)	52
Japan Hot Overseas (Billboard Japan)	15
New Zealand Hot Singles (RMNZ)	15
UK Singles (Official Charts)	90
US Dance Airplay (Billboard)	1
US Digital Song Sales (Billboard)	6
US Hot Dance/Pop Songs (Billboard)	12
Venezuela Anglo Airplay (Monitor Latino)	10

== Release history ==
Region	Date	Format(s)	Version	Label	Ref.
Various	April 17, 2026	Digital download; streaming	Original	Warner	
Various	May 15, 2026	Digital download; streaming	Peggy Gou energy mix	Warner	
Italy	May 15, 2026	Radio airplay	Peggy Gou energy mix	Warner	

== See also ==
- List of Billboard number-one dance songs of 2026
