= Read My Lips (Madonna and Feid song) =

Song by Madonna and Feid

from the album Confessions II
- Released: June 26, 2026 (FIFA version); July 3, 2026 (album version)
- Studio: Bentley Studios (New York City); Start Here (London)
- Genre: Latin pop
- Length: 4:46 (album version); 2:47 (FIFA version)
- Label: Warner
- Songwriters: Madonna; Stuart Price; Marcos Masis; Salomón Villada Hoyos
- Producers: Madonna; Stuart Price; Tainy

Official audio
- Album version on YouTube
- FIFA version on YouTube

"Read My Lips" is a song by the American singer Madonna and Colombian singer Feid from Madonna's fifteenth studio album, Confessions II (2026). It was written and produced by Madonna, Stuart Price and Tainy, with additional songwriting by Feid. Prior to its release, its alternative version, subtitled "FIFA version", was included on the bonus edition of Official FIFA World Cup 2026 Album compilation.

== Release and promotion ==
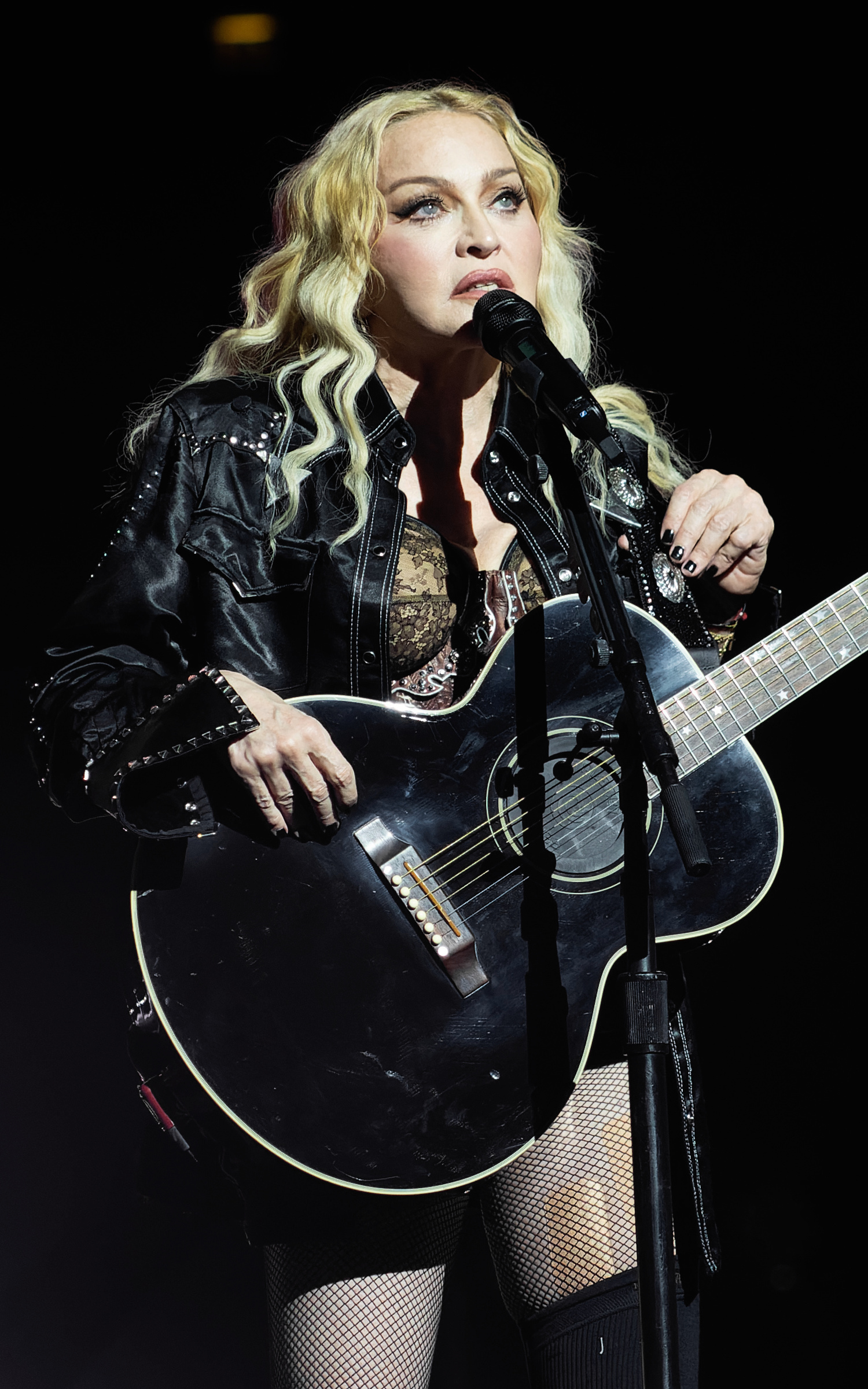
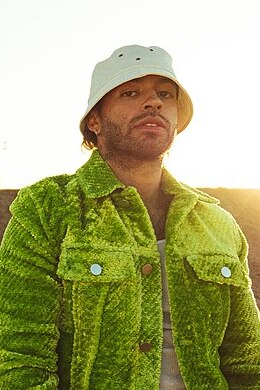
Madonna (left) and Feid (right)

Madonna announced her fifteenth studio album, Confessions II, on April 15, 2026. Produced by Stuart Price, the album serves as a sequel to Confessions on a Dance Floor (2005). The song was written and produced by Madonna, Price and Tainy, with additional songwriting by Feid. On May 14, 2026, the track list for the album had appeared on posters in major global cities, containing 12 tracks, including "Read My Lips".

The shortened version of "Read My Lips" was included in the short musical film Confessions II, released on June 5, 2026. Its scene features Feid behind a vanity mirror, watching Madonna singing on screens. An alternative version of the song, subtitled FIFA version, was released on June 25, 2026, on the bonus edition of Official FIFA World Cup 2026 Album, the official compilation album of the 2026 FIFA World Cup, ahead of Madonna's performance at its final halftime show.

== Composition ==
"Read My Lips" is a Latin pop song with a "pacy beat". Its arrangement features Spanish guitar, which, according to Katie Bain from Billboard, "adds to the Latin mood", as well as sampled Batucada drums. John Murphy of musicOMH felt it was flecked by flamenco and compared it to Madonna's 1986 song "La Isla Bonita". Vulture's Craig Jenkins called it "a middle ground" between the Latin pop style of "La Isla Bonita" and South American party music. The song is about the failed love and lies, with Madonna commanding "Shut your mouth". Feid is singing in Spanish in its second half.

== Critical reception ==
John Earls of Classic Pop complimented Feid's verse, calling the song "a more fluid, uplifting party anthem than anything on guest-heavy albums like MDNA or Rebel Heart". Ludovic Hunter-Tilney of Financial Times called it a "well-worked exercise in Latin pop". Ximena Zambrano of Rolling Stone called it a "fresh, balanced, and natural collaboration" and complimented the performers for retaining their signature styles "without losing their artistic identities". Jovita Trujillo of ¡Hola! called it "the perfect fusion of energies".

Katie Bain from Billboard felt the song "doesn't seem likely to be an eventual fan favorite, but does its job in terms of the album's overall tone-setting". Paolo Ragusa of Consequence opined the song "can't save itself from being a stereotypical 'boy, bye' clap-back".

== Credits and personnel ==
The credits are adapted from Madonna's official website and Tidal.

- Madonna – vocals, songwriting, producer
- Feid – vocals, songwriting
- Stuart Price – songwriting, producer, keyboards, bass, guitar, strings arrangement, drum programming, engineering, mixing
- Tainy – bass, drum programming, songwriting, producer
- Henry Elkind – engineering assistance
- Jeremy Brown – engineering assistance
- Theo Rogers – second engineering assistance
- Varun Jhunjhunwalla – second engineering assistance
- Luke Volkert – second engineering assistance
- Ruairi O'Flaherty – mastering
- Miles Showell – vinyl master cut

Recorded at Bentley Studios (New York City) and Start Here (London). Mixed at Start Here (London). Mastered at Sterling Sound (Los Angeles). Vinyl master cut at Abbey Road Studios (London).

== Charts ==
Chart performance
Chart (2026)	Peak position
Honduras Anglo Airplay (Monitor Latino)	2
Panama Anglo Airplay (Monitor Latino)	11
Paraguay Anglo Airplay (Monitor Latino)	9
UK Singles Sales (OC)	32
