= My Sins Are My Savior =

Song by Madonna and Stromae

from the album Confessions II
- Language: English; French
- Released: July 3, 2026
- Studio: Start Here (London)
- Genre: Hip-house; trip-hop
- Length: 3:20
- Label: Warner
- Songwriters: Madonna; Stuart Price; Paul Van Haver; Magnus Baard; Lars Hakansson; Anders Hansson; Tim Norell; Per Thyrén
- Producers: Madonna; Stuart Price

"My Sins Are My Savior" is a song by American singer-songwriter Madonna featuring Belgian rapper Stromae from her fifteenth studio album, Confessions II (2026). It was written by Madonna, Stuart Price and Paul Van Haver (Stromae). As Army of Lovers' 1991 song "My Army of Lovers" is sampled on the song, Magnus Baard, Lars Hakansson, Anders Hansson, Tim Norell, and Per Thyren also receive songwriting credits. The song became available as the album's thirteenth track on July 3, 2026, by Warner Records. It's a electro-R&B-influenced hip-house and trip-hop song which reflects on public judgment, resilience, and personal redemption.

== Background and release ==
In 2005, Madonna released her tenth studio album Confessions on a Dance Floor, produced by Stuart Price, to critical and commercial success. In September 2024, Madonna announced on her Instagram account that she was working on new music with Price. The following February, she confirmed that her new music was a follow-up to Confessions on a Dance Floor and teased its release in 2025. She continued to document the recording sessions on social media, posting pictures in the studio with Price throughout 2025. In September 2025, she announced a reunion with her original record label of over 25 years, Warner Records, with the album slated for release in 2026. Madonna officially announced Confessions II on April 15, 2026, and its tracklist on May 14, revealing "My Sins Are My Savior" as the thirteenth song on the tracklist. Warner Records released the song along with the rest of the album for digital download and streaming on July 3.

== Composition ==
"My Sins Are My Savior" was written by Madonna, Stuart Price, Stromae, Magnus Baard, Lars Hakansson, Anders Hansson, Tim Norell, and Per Thyren, and produced by Madonna and Price. Recorded and mixed by Price at Start Here in London, the track features keyboards, bass, drum programming, and string arrangements by Price. Musically, the track is a hip-house, trip-hop, and R&B-influenced electronic ballad that samples Army of Lovers' 1991 single "My Army of Lovers". The arrangement transitions from legato French spoken word to percolating rhythms reminiscent of Brian Eno and David Byrne's collaborative soundscapes, hazy devotional textures, and subtle piano flourishes. Critics noted strong sonic and stylistic nods to Madonna's 1990s releases, including Erotica (1992), Bedtime Stories (1994), and "Justify My Love" (1990).

Lyrically, "My Sins Are My Savior" functions as a deeply confessional reflection on public judgment, resilience, and personal redemption. Through untranslated French spoken word by Stromae and whispered English vocals by Madonna, the song directly addresses her critics and societal condemnation ("They tried to break me / But I would not give in", "They tried to take me down / They tried to take my crown"). In an interview with Interview, Madonna explained that the lyrics target "narrow-minded people" and societal hypocrisy, while asserting that her provocative artistic choices hold deeper layers of meaning. The lyrics also feature literary and cinematic references to Marquis de Sade and Belle de Jour, framing past struggles, mistakes, and perceived sins as sources of strength and spiritual salvation ("I was not lost, I was just broken... My sins are my savior").

== Critical reception ==
Joe Lynch, for Billboard, named the song the fourteenth best on Confessions II, stating that it "enriches the experience without standing on its own".

== Credits and personnel ==
The credits are adapted from Madonna's official website.

- Madonna – vocals, songwriting, producer
- Stromae – featured vocals, songwriting
- Stuart Price – songwriting, producer, keyboards, bass, drum programming, string arrangement, engineering, mixing
- Magnus Baard – songwriting
- Lars Hakansson – songwriting
- Anders Hansson – songwriting
- Tim Norell – songwriting
- Per Thyren – songwriting
- Ruairi O'Flaherty – mastering
- Miles Showell – vinyl master cut

Recorded and mixed at Start Here (London). Mastered at Sterling Sound (Los Angeles). Vinyl master cut at Abbey Road Studios (London).
