= French Kiss (Lil Louis song) =

Single by Lil Louis

from the album From the Mind of Lil Louis
- Released: July 17, 1989
- Genre: House; acid house; techno
- Length: 9:52
- Label: Epic; FFRR
- Songwriters: Marvin Burns; Karlana Johnson
- Producer: Lil Louis

Lil Louis singles chronology
"French Kiss" (1989)	"New York" (1989)

Alternative cover
- US release, B-side

"French Kiss" is a song by American DJ and record producer Lil Louis, released in July 1989 by Epic and FFRR Records. It was written by Marvin Burns and Karlana Johnson, and was a European and American hit played widely in clubs, spending two weeks at number one on the US Billboard Dance Club Play chart in October 1989. The song became a crossover pop hit, peaking at number 50 on the Billboard Hot 100. It was also a mainstream pop hit in several European countries, where it entered the top five in 10 countries. In the United Kingdom, where the song peaked at number two, it was banned by the BBC.

Originally an instrumental song (apart from wordless moans), vocals were recorded after the song was picked up for distribution by major labels. In the United States, the lead vocals on the track were performed by American singer Shawn Christopher and in Europe vocal duties were performed by a woman known only as Pasquale.

== Structure and usage ==
Distinctions of this song are that it is based on a single note (F-natural) and that it gradually slows down to a complete stop, marked by the sound of female moans, and then gradually speeding up. This was an innovative feature for any dance track at that time. The song includes a more erotic vocal performance than the title implies.

The American 12-inch single was never released commercially on compact disc. It was sampled heavily on Josh Wink's single "How's Your Evening So Far?"—credited to Wink vs. Lil Louis. It was also sampled on the Wiseguys' 1998 song "Au-Pair Girls". In 1990, French TV presenter Lagaf' used a sample of the song in a parodic version under the name Bo le lavabo (WC Kiss).

A remix of Sonia's 1990 single "You'll Never Stop Me Loving You" called the "Kissing mix" was created by adding Sonia's vocals onto the song's instrumental version. It was also sampled on a remix of "The Loco-Motion" for Kylie Minogue's 1990 Enjoy Yourself Tour as the "The Oz Tour Mix", which remained unreleased in studio form until it appeared on the bonus disc of remixes of the 2002 compilation Greatest Hits ’87–’92.

The main riff was used by Black Box on its song "Open Your Eyes" in 1990.

The track was featured on the 1999 Carl Cox DJ album Non-stop 2000—CD 1, starting roughly midway through track six, "Funk on the Roll". Cox seamlessly mixed it in the background continuously, through the whole of the next track "Let It Roll", before it plays in its entire original form as track eight.

The song's moans are sampled as part of the beat on "Custom Made (Give It to You)" by Lil' Kim, which appeared on her album The Notorious K.I.M.

In 2014, Norwegian singer Annie released the protest song "Russian Kiss" (which condemns Russia's anti-gay laws), that used a reworked instrumental of Louis' track. Robyn's 2018 song "Send to Robin Immediately" creates a slow build using a sample of "French Kiss".

The 2026 promotional single and first track of the album Confessions II (2026) by American singer-songwriter Madonna, "I Feel So Free", samples the song. It was written and produced by Madonna and Stuart Price, with co-production by Arca. Later versions of the song, like the Peggy Gou remix also sampled Louis' song.

== Impact and legacy ==
In 1995, American DJ, record producer, remixer and songwriter Armand van Helden named "French Kiss" one of his "classic cuts", saying, "This song is my first introduction to trance because, to me, it's a serious house track. It was for real house enthusiasts at the time. It's a simple track which builds, it's very electronic. It's full of soul. It's very sexual. It's the first dance track I've known to date to change bpms drastically – I've never heard of an electronic track that had the balls to do that." Also British DJ and producer Pete Tong named it one of his "classic cuts" the same year, adding, "One of the most important riffs ever written in house music and frequently imitated but never bettered. Everyone else has put it in their charts so why shouldn't I? I signed it and it makes me proud. You can hear its influence in almost 50% of house music that comes out in Europe." In 1996, Mixmag ranked it number 53 in its "100 Greatest Dance Singles of All Time" list, commenting, "Back in 1989, this was the record that every DJ needed. The one that, if you dared mix out it before the slow down - orgasm bit - speed up gimmick, a horde of people would come up to the DJ for a whinge. At the time it was a bit of fun, a peak time stomper for the height of orbital raving. But looking back, nothing else set the repetitive building tone so much for what would become trance. Ten minutes of eyes-closed bliss from Chicago's legendary trackhead." In 2003, Q Magazine ranked it number 516 in their list of the "1001 Best Songs Ever".

In 2006, Slant Magazine ranked it 7th in its "100 Greatest Dance Songs" list, adding, "'French Kiss' is a moaning, sex-as-house track that audaciously and amazingly slows down and then stops altogether. It builds again, chugging back to its initial speed until it fades brighter than ever in post-orgasmic glow." In 2014, Rolling Stone featured it in their "20 Best Chicago House Records" list, saying, "For all the pseudo-romantic flailings of contemporary EDM diva anthems, it's hard to match the raw sexiness of this track, whose vocals came courtesy of Shawn Christopher. But Louis also stretched house's characteristic build-ups to their most dramatic extreme for the era. "French Kiss" is one long, drawn-out crescendo to a climax — get it? — and it hits an almost techno-like, robotic trance." In 2015, Time Out's list of "The 20 Best House Tracks Ever" included it as number four. They wrote, "This number from Chicago's Lil' Louis was one of the first house tracks to enjoy both considerable commercial success and heavy club airplay on its release. Even one listen to its infectious, unrelenting groove and orgasmic tempo shifts is enough to understand why it got everyone so excited. In 2020, NME ranked "French Kiss" among "The 20 Best House Music Songs... Ever!", while Slant Magazine ranked it number 26 in its list of "The 100 Best Dance Songs of All Time". In 2022, Rolling Stone ranked it number 21 in its list of "200 Greatest Dance Songs of All Time". In 2024, Classic Pop ranked "French Kiss" number nine in its list of "Top 20 80s House Hits" and DJ Mag featured it in their "40 Essential Tracks from 40 Years of House Music". In 2025, Billboard magazine ranked it numbers 53 and 18 in its lists of "The 100 Best Dance Songs of All Time" and "The 50 Best House Songs of All Time".

== Formats and track listings ==
=== United Kingdom ===
- 12-inch, cassette and CD single
1. "French Kiss" — 10:02
2. "Wargames" — 7:18

Note: The tracks are actually 9:55 and 7:13 long, respectively, but almost all artwork denote the longer durations.

- 7-inch single
1. "French Kiss" — 4:09
2. "New York" — 3:40
- French Kisses (The Complete Mix Collection E.P.) – 12-inch, cassette and CD
1. "French Kiss (Original Mix)" — 10:02
2. "French Kiss (Innocent Until Proven Guilty Vocal Remix) (Re-Layed)" — 9:45
3. "French Kiss (Passion Radio Mix)" — 4:15
4. "French Kiss (Back Up Your Conversion Mix)" — 9:45
5. "French Kiss (Hitting Virgin Territory Instrumental Mix)" — 3:50

=== United States ===
- 12-inch single
1. "French Kiss" — 10:02
2. "New York" — 3:40
3. "Wargames (Remix)" — 7:18
4. "Jupiter" — 5:20
- 12-inch remix single
1. "French Kiss" (The Original Underground Mix) — 9:54
2. "French Kiss" (Talkin' All That Jazz Mix) — 4:14
3. "French Kiss" (Short But Sweet Radio Vocal Mix) — 4:08
4. "French Kiss" (The Songbird Sings Long Vocal Mix) — 9:59
5. "French Kiss" (Cherry Talk Conversational Mix) — 5:29

== Charts ==
=== Weekly charts ===
Chart (1989)	Peak position
Australia (ARIA)	35
Austria (Ö3 Austria Top 40)	4
Belgium (Ultratop 50 Flanders)	3
Europe (Eurochart Hot 100)	3
Finland (Suomen virallinen lista)	3
France (SNEP)	5
Greece (IFPI Greece)	2
Iceland (Íslenski Listinn Topp 10)	8
Ireland (IRMA)	6
Luxembourg (Radio Luxembourg)	4
Netherlands (Dutch Top 40)	1
Netherlands (Single Top 100)	1
Spain (AFYVE)	2
Sweden (Sverigetopplistan)	16
Switzerland (Schweizer Hitparade)	2
UK Singles (Official Charts)	2
US Billboard Hot 100	50
US 12-inch Singles Sales (Billboard)	1
US Dance Club Play (Billboard)	1
West Germany (GfK)	2

=== Year-end charts ===
Chart (1989)	Position
Belgium (Ultratop)	31
Europe (Eurochart Hot 100)	8
Netherlands (Dutch Top 40)	36
Netherlands (Single Top 100)	13
Switzerland (Schweizer Hitparade)	24
UK Singles (OCC)	28
US 12-inch Singles Sales (Billboard)	20
US Dance Club Play (Billboard)	2
West Germany (Media Control)	14

== Certifications and sales ==
Region	Certification	Certified units/sales
France (SNEP)	Silver	200,000^{*}
Germany (BVMI)	Gold	250,000^{^}
^{*} Sales figures based on certification alone.^{^} Shipments figures based on certification alone.

== See also ==
- List of number-one dance hits (United States)
