= MTV Video Music Award for Best Album =

Music video award

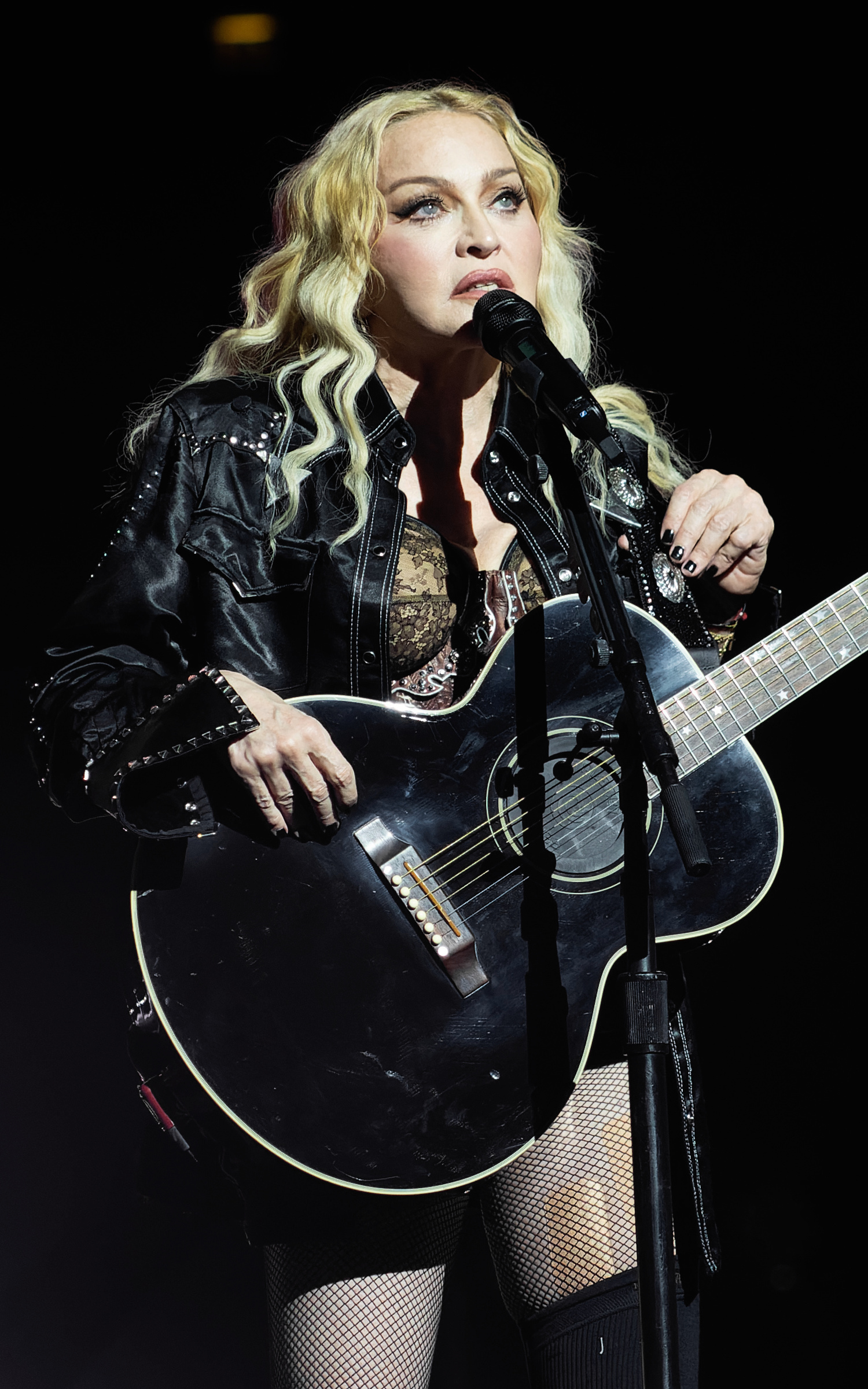
- Confessions II by Madonna is the most recent recipient
- Country: United States
- Presented by: MTV
- First award: 2022
- Currently held by: Madonna – Confessions II (2026)

Highlights
- Most nominations: Bad Bunny and Drake (2)
- Website: VMA website

The MTV Video Music Award for Best Album is a recent category presented at the annual MTV Video Music Awards. It was introduced at the 2022 ceremony as Album of the Year, marking the first time the VMAs recognized full-length albums as part of its awards. The category was not presented in 2024 and was reinstated in 2025 under its current name.

== Recipients ==
=== 2020s ===
Recipients
Year (Note: Each year is linked to the article about the MTV Video Music Awards held that year.)	Winner(s)	Album	Nominees	Ref.
2022	Harry Styles	Harry's House	Adele – 30; Bad Bunny – Un Verano Sin Ti; Billie Eilish – Happier Than Ever; Drake – Certified Lover Boy	
2023	Taylor Swift	Midnights	Beyoncé – Renaissance; Drake and 21 Savage – Her Loss; Metro Boomin – Heroes & Villains; Miley Cyrus – Endless Summer Vacation; SZA – SOS	
2024	—N/a			
2025	Sabrina Carpenter	Short n' Sweet	Bad Bunny – Debí Tirar Más Fotos; Kendrick Lamar – GNX; Lady Gaga – Mayhem; Morgan Wallen – I'm the Problem; The Weeknd – Hurry Up Tomorrow	
2026	Madonna	Confessions II	Bruno Mars – The Romantic; Drake – Iceman; Ella Langley – Dandelion; Harry Styles – Kiss All the Time. Disco, Occasionally; Olivia Dean – The Art of Loving; Olivia Rodrigo – You Seem Pretty Sad for a Girl So in Love; Sabrina Carpenter – Man's Best Friend; Taylor Swift – The Life of a Showgirl	
