= Love Without Words =

Song by Madonna

from the album Confessions II
- Released: July 3, 2026
- Studio: Start Here (London)
- Genre: Deep house
- Length: 4:20
- Label: Warner
- Songwriters: Madonna; Stuart Price
- Producers: Madonna; Stuart Price; Parisi

"Love Without Words" is a song by American singer-songwriter Madonna from her fifteenth studio album, Confessions II (2026). She wrote and produced it alongside British producer Stuart Price, with Italian duo Parisi credited as additional producers, and the song became available as the album's ninth track on July 3, 2026, by Warner Records. A deep house song, its lyrics are an ode to dance music, mentioning house, techno and trance as "love without words".

== Background and release ==
In 2005, Madonna released her tenth studio album Confessions on a Dance Floor, produced by Stuart Price, to critical and commercial success. In September 2024, Madonna announced on her Instagram account that she was working on new music with Price. The following February, she confirmed that her new music was a follow-up to Confessions on a Dance Floor and teased its release in 2025. She continued to document the recording sessions on social media, posting pictures in the studio with Price throughout 2025. In September 2025, she announced a reunion with her original record label of over 25 years, Warner Records, with the album slated for release in 2026. Madonna officially announced Confessions II on April 15, 2026, and its tracklist on May 14, revealing "Love Without Words" as the ninth song on the tracklist. Warner Records released the song along with the rest of the album for digital download and streaming on July 3.

== Composition ==
"Love Without Words" was written and produced by Madonna and Stuart Price, with additional production provided by the Italian duo Parisi. Recorded and mixed by Price at Start Here in London, the track features instrumentation including keyboards and bass by Price and Marco Parisi, alongside drums and programming by Price and Giampaolo Parisi. Musically, "Love Without Words" is a slinky, groovy deep house and electronic track. The arrangement unfolds layer by layer, featuring experimental chopped-up vocals, squelchy synths, and an eruptive acid synth line in its middle section. Following a transition into digital noise, the song builds toward an Italo-disco drop.

Lyrically, "Love Without Words" serves as a reverent ode to dance music and club culture, framing movement and dancing as a universal language. Madonna opens the track by declaring its musical ethos ("Call it trance, call it house / Call it love without words"), which reviewers compared to her 2005 song "Future Lovers". The song incorporates themes of unity and spiritual sanctuary on the dancefloor ("You are a sister to me... You are a brother to me", "This is a club, this is a temple of sweat and surrender"), alongside repetitive club-oriented mantras beckoning listeners to join the experience ("Come to the Club, come in to the Club of Love").

== Critical reception ==
Katie Bain, for Billboard, named "Love Without Words" the eleventh best song on Confessions II, stating that although the song's message runs throughout the album, "we don’t mind hearing it again here". For BBC News, Mark Savage wrote that "by this point we've heard some variation of "the rhythm sets us free" approximately 900 times. Yes, we get it, Madonna. Dancing = good. Not dancing = sad face emoji".

== Credits and personnel ==
The credits are adapted from Madonna's official website.

- Madonna – vocals, songwriting, producer
- Stuart Price – songwriting, producer, keyboards, bass, drums, programming, engineering, mixing
- Marco Parisi – bass, synthesizers, additional producer
- Giampaolo Parisi – drums, programming, additional producer
- Ruairi O'Flaherty – mastering
- Miles Showell – vinyl master cut

Recorded at Republic Studios (New York City) and Start Here (London). Mixed at Start Here (London). Mastered at Sterling Sound (Los Angeles). Vinyl master cut at Abbey Road Studios (London).
