= School (Madonna song) =

Song by Madonna

from the album Confessions II
- Released: July 3, 2026
- Studio: Start Here (London); Sterling Sound (Los Angeles); Abbey Road Studios (London)
- Genre: Techno; house
- Length: 4:23
- Label: Warner
- Songwriters: Madonna; Stuart Price; Lanita LaShonda Smith; Scott M. Carter; Mustapha M. Mbiakop; Matthew Fonson; Jessica Ashley Karpov
- Producers: Madonna; Stuart Price; Lanita LaShonda Smith; Triangle Park; Mustapha LeBeau

"School" is a song by American singer-songwriter Madonna from her fifteenth studio album, Confessions II (2026). She wrote it alongside British producer Stuart Price, Lanita Smith, Scott M. Carter, Mustapha Mbiakop, Matthew Fonson, and Jessica Ashley Karpov, and produced it with Price, Smith, Triangle Park, and Mustapha LeBeau, and the song became available as the album's eleventh track on July 3, 2026, by Warner Records. The dark techno and house song has lyrics that use "school" as a central euphemism for sexual education and empowerment.

== Background and release ==
In 2005, Madonna released her tenth studio album Confessions on a Dance Floor, produced by Stuart Price, to critical and commercial success. In September 2024, Madonna announced on her Instagram account that she was working on new music with Price. The following February, she confirmed that her new music was a follow-up to Confessions on a Dance Floor and teased its release in 2025. She continued to document the recording sessions on social media, posting pictures in the studio with Price throughout 2025. In September 2025, she announced a reunion with her original record label of over 25 years, Warner Records, with the album slated for release in 2026. Madonna officially announced Confessions II on April 15, 2026, and its tracklist on May 14, revealing "School" as the eleventh song on the tracklist. Warner Records released the song along with the rest of the album for digital download and streaming on July 3.

== Composition ==
"School" was written by Madonna, Stuart Price, Lanita Smith, Scott M. Carter, Mustapha Mbiakop, Matthew Fonson, and Jessica Ashley Karpov, and produced by Madonna, Price, Smith, Triangle Park, and Mustapha LeBeau. The track was recorded at Start Here in London, Londyn Taylor Studio, and The Park House Studio, with mixing by Price and additional production elements including keyboards by LeBeau and Price, alongside bass and drum programming by Price. During a TikTok livestream, Price revealed that Madonna created all the vocal effects on the song herself. Musically, "School" is an unconventional, dark, and sexually charged techno and house track characterized by a throbbing, hissing beat, shimmering percussion, chopped-up vocal samples, and squelchy synthesizers. Some critics noted that the swirly, pulsing production matched the overt, lip-biting sensuality of her albums Erotica (1992) and Bedtime Stories (1994).

Lyrically, the song uses "school" as a central euphemism for sexual education and empowerment, opening with a spoken word request: "Please, someone, teach me something I don't already know." Throughout the song, Madonna delivers smoldering, provocative lines about desire, agency, and romance ("I can make moves on the dance floor / I can make love on a man's floor", "'Cause, baby, I'm not your mother / I'd rather be your lover"). The lyrics also address romantic skepticism and artistic metaphors ("Maybe you're Picasso, but you're also a liar / I need a blank canvas and I'll paint my desire"), alongside themes of personal consent and self-rule ("Nobody knows all the rules"). The song also references her 1994 track "I'd Rather Be Your Lover", from Bedtime Stories ("'Cause, baby, I'm not your mother / I'd rather be your lover, lover, lover").

== Critical reception ==
Katie Bain, for Billboard, named "School" the fifth best song on Confessions II, stating that in the song, "she again defies the haters, proving that Madonna at 67 is as proudly lusty as she was in any other era, and that she’s not only refusing to apologize for it but, as is her legacy, insisting on making it sound and feel good." Hattie Lindert, for Pitchfork, named the song one of the contenders for the 2026 song of the summer, saying that the "there’s a reason the entrance to Madonna’s hot-commodity Knockdown Center pop-up was between her legs. Her bag has always been body music, and “School” is Confessions II’s throbbing, veiny heart."

== Credits and personnel ==
The credits are adapted from Madonna's official website.

- Madonna – vocals, songwriting, producer
- Stuart Price – songwriting, producer, bass, drum programming, keyboards, engineering, mixing
- Lanita Smith – songwriting, producer, engineering
- Triangle Park – producer
- Mustapha LeBeau – songwriting, producer, keyboards
- Scott M. Carter (Robot Scott Carter) – songwriting, engineering
- Mustapha M. Mbiakop – songwriting
- Matthew Fonson – songwriting
- Jessica Ashley Karpov – songwriting
- Ruairi O'Flaherty – mastering
- Miles Showell – vinyl master cut

Recorded at Start Here (London), Londyn Taylor Studio, and The Park House Studio. Mixed at Start Here (London). Mastered at Sterling Sound (Los Angeles). Vinyl master cut at Abbey Road Studios (London).
