= Lourdes Leon =

American singer and dancer; daughter of Madonna (born 1996)

- Born: Lourdes Maria Ciccone Leon; October 14, 1996 (age 30); Los Angeles, California, U.S.
- Education: University of Michigan; State University of New York at Purchase
- Occupations: Singer; dancer; model
- Years active: 2009–present
- Mother: Madonna
- Relatives: Christopher Ciccone (uncle)
- Musical career
- Also known as: Lola Leon • Lolahol
- Genre: Experimental
- Label: Chemical X
- Modeling information
- Height: 5 ft 7 in (1.70 m)
- Hair color: Black
- Eye color: Hazel
- Agency: Creative Artists Agency

Lourdes Maria Ciccone Leon (born October 14, 1996), also known as Lola Leon, is an American singer, dancer and fashion model. Her parents are Madonna and Carlos Leon. In September 2021, she appeared on an ensemble cast cover of Vogue. In August 2022, she released her debut single "Lock&Key", which was then followed by her debut extended play, Go (2022).

== Early life and education ==
Lourdes Maria Ciccone Leon was born at Good Samaritan Hospital in Los Angeles, California, on October 14, 1996. She is the oldest child of American singer, songwriter, and actress Madonna, and personal trainer and actor Carlos Leon. From her parents' subsequent marriages and adoptions, Leon has a paternal half-brother, a maternal half-brother, Rocco, from her mother's marriage to British film director Guy Ritchie, as well as a brother and three sisters all born in Malawi. Her mother is of Italian and French-Canadian ancestry, while her father is of Afro-Cuban ancestry. Speaking about her life, El País mentioned "it was documented even before she was born."

While still very young, Leon appeared at some events and works by her mother, including her performance at the 2003 MTV Video Music Awards, throwing petals on the stage, a cameo in an alternative video of "Celebration" in 2009, and provided backing vocals at MDNA's track "Superstar" in 2012, which her mother wrote about her.

Her mother put her in ballet classes beginning at age three after she expressed an interest. Leon grew up in New York City and went to Fiorello H. LaGuardia High School, a performing arts school in Manhattan. Among other students, actor Timothée Chalamet also attended the school and she regards him as her first boyfriend. After graduating, she began college at the University of Michigan's Ann Arbor campus, but transferred to New York's Purchase College after reportedly seeing her first MAGA hat on campus. She continued studying dance at Purchase in its intensive program. Leon told Vogue magazine in 2021, she paid for her own college studies, driven by her desire to be independent of Madonna, whom she labeled at that time as a "control freak", though she later credited, "I didn't fully comprehend that until I realized the importance of empowerment". She also told Interview magazine, "Obviously, I grew up with extreme privilege. There's no denying that. But I think my mom saw all these other kids of famous people, and she was like, 'My kids are not going to be like this'".

== Career ==
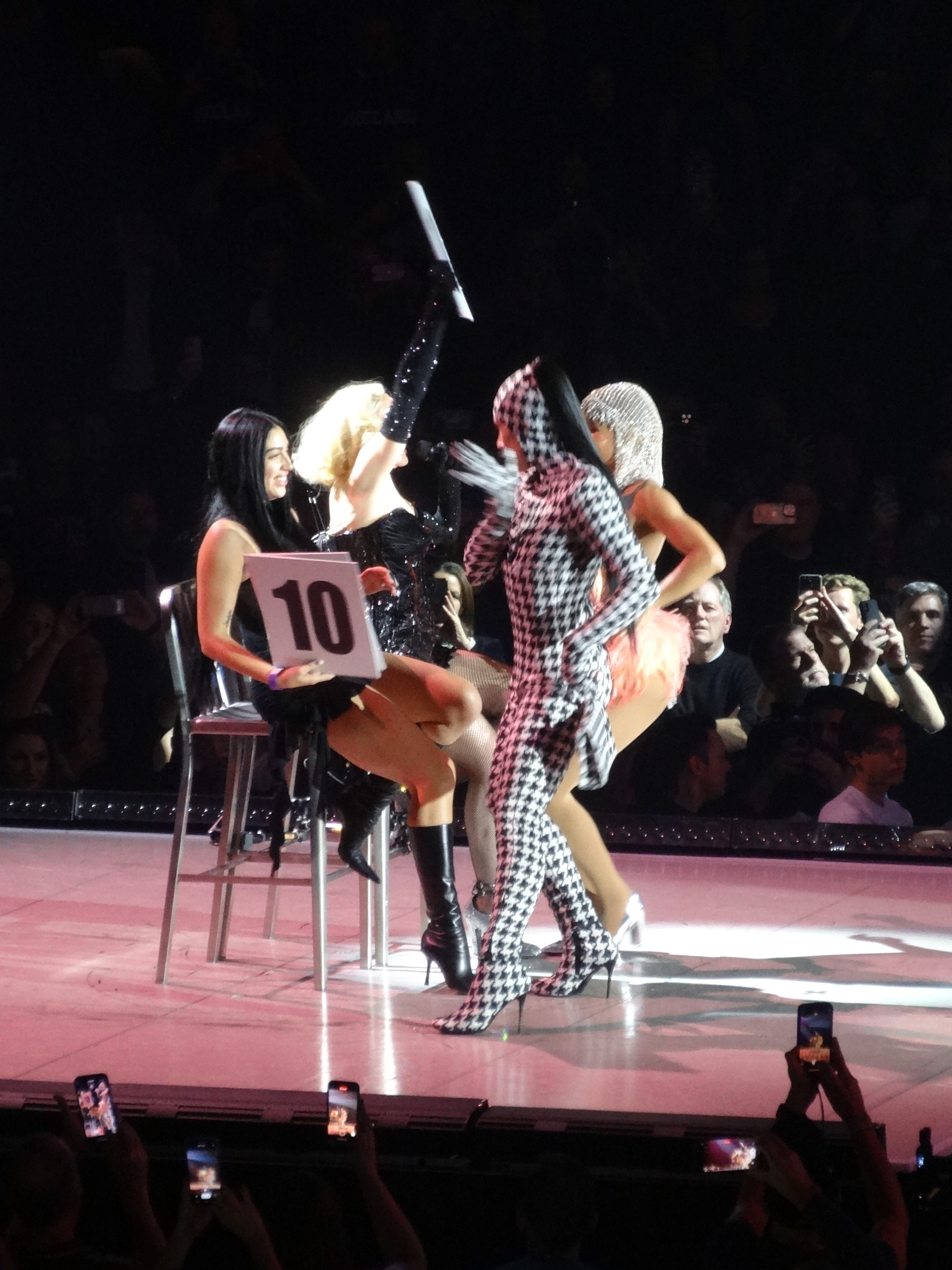
Leon and Madonna (on the chairs) during the Celebration Tour in London, 2023

Leon's first forays in fashion began in 2010. She and Madonna created Material Girl, a teenage clothing line sold exclusively through Macy's stores. Leon made her modeling debut starring in a perfume ad campaign for Pop by Stella McCartney, also featuring Grimes, Amandla Stenberg, and Kenya Kinski-Jones. She has further appeared in campaigns for Marc Jacobs, Miu Miu, Calvin Klein, Tom Ford, Burberry, Savage X Fenty, Gypsy Sport, Dion Lee and Mugler. In 2018, she made her runway debut at New York Fashion Week. She appeared on the September 2021 cover of American Vogue with models Anok Yai, Ariel Nicholson, Bella Hadid, Kaia Gerber, Precious Lee, Sherry Shi, and Yumi Nu. In 2023, she became the face of a limited edition flavor Coca-Cola's 3000 Zero Sugar, and made her first makeup campaign as one of the faces of Make Up For Ever.

Leon, using the stage name Lolahol, made her musical debut in August 2022 via Chemical X, an imprint of record label Mad Decent. Her first release was "Lock&Key", followed by "Cuntradiction" in November, both from her five-track debut EP Go, an experimental music project launched on November 9, 2022, in collaboration with American multi-instrumentalist, producer, composer and vocalist Eartheater. On October 11, 2023, she released "Spelling". Its visuals paid homage to Madonna's video for "Frozen" (1998). Leon also made her first major musical performance debut at IFEMA's Brava Madrid Music Festival on September 23, 2023.

Leon co-wrote and provided vocals for a track titled "The Test", for her mother's 2026 album Confessions II, which the latter described as a "healing moment" between them; Leon also made a cameo appearance in the album's accompanying short film Confessions II.

== Influences ==
Leon has cited various British artists of the late 1990s and early 2000s as influences, including PJ Harvey, Massive Attack and Amy Winehouse. She commented about Winehouse: "She really didn't give a shit about optics of who she was and was just there to make music".

Speaking about Madonna's music and influence, Leon said: "My experience with my mom's music has changed so much as I've gotten older, because I'm increasingly able to recognize how influential and amazing this woman is, and how empowering to other women [...] she has always been". She has also taken inspiration from Madonna while building a career in fashion, denoting her advice: "It's not about the money or your face or how hot you look. It's about what you're bringing into the world and what you're going to leave behind".

== Discography ==
=== Extended plays ===
- Go (2022)

=== Singles ===
List of singles as lead artist, showing year released and originating album
Title	Year	Album
"Lock&Key"	2022	Go
"Love Me Still" (with J!mmy)	2022	Non-album single
"Cuntradiction"	2022	Go
"Spelling"	2023	Non-album singles
"Boy Next Door"	2023	Non-album singles
"Except in Spring" (with Safety Trance)	2026	Sacrificio
"T Shirt"	2026	TBA

=== Guest appearances ===
List of appearances as a guest, showing year released, lead artist(s), originating album and role(s) on a given track
Title	Year	Artist(s)	Album	Role(s)
"Superstar"	2012	Madonna	MDNA	Background vocals
"Sore"	2023	Bapari	Oasis	Featured artist
"Mona Lisa Moan"	2023	Eartheater	Powders	Background vocals
"Ancient History"	2026	Wiki	Ancient History	Background vocals
"The Test"	2026	Madonna	Confessions II	Featured artist
