= Confessions II =

Studio album by Madonna
- Released: July 3, 2026
- Recorded: 2024–2026
- Studios: Bentley House (New York City); Start Here (London); Republic (New York City); Electric Lady (New York City); Taylor (London); The Park House
- Genres: EDM; house; dance-pop; synth-pop; disco
- Length: 63:52
- Languages: English; Spanish; French
- Label: Warner
- Producers: Madonna; Stuart Price; Andrew Watt; Cirkut; Tainy; Martin Garrix; Osrin; Lanita Smith; Triangle Park; Mustapha LeBeau; Mirwais

Madonna chronology
Bedtime Stories: The Untold Chapter (2025)	Confessions II (2026)

Singles from Confessions II
- 1. "Bring Your Love" Released: April 30, 2026; 2. "Love Sensation" Released: June 4, 2026; 3. "Danceteria" Released: July 10, 2026

Confessions II (also referred to as Confessions on a Dance Floor: Part II) is the fifteenth studio album by American singer and songwriter Madonna. It was released on July 3, 2026, through Warner Records. Conceived as a sequel to Confessions on a Dance Floor (2005), the album was inspired by familial and professional challenges, in addition to the sociopolitical state of the world, which led Madonna to record an upbeat album as a distraction. She wrote and produced all the material with Stuart Price, her main collaborator on the original album. Madonna also worked with Andrew Watt, Cirkut, Tainy, Martin Garrix, and Mirwais. Confessions II features guest appearances by Sabrina Carpenter, Feid, Stromae, and Madonna's eldest daughter Lola Leon.

Mainly an EDM record, it explores a variety of dance and electronic music subgenres, including house, dance-pop, disco, trip hop, and downtempo. Like Confessions on a Dance Floor, it is structured like a continuous DJ mix and includes several samples and interpolations. Its main themes are freedom, escapism, self-realization, grief, and spirituality. Additionally, it includes memories of Madonna's early life and troubled family relationships. Partially a visual album, it was accompanied by a short musical film, Confessions II. The album has spawned three singles: "Bring Your Love", "Love Sensation", and "Danceteria," while "I Feel So Free" was released as a promotional single. Additionally, a remix of "Love Sensation" with Kylie Minogue and a remix of "Danceteria" with Charli XCX were released. Madonna promoted the album through several promotional campaigns, live performances, and a series of club appearances with Price called Club Confessions.

Confessions II received critical acclaim upon its release, with multiple critics calling it Madonna's best album since Confessions on a Dance Floor. Particular praise was aimed at the eclectic production, Madonna's introspective lyricism and her vocals. The album charted at number one in 17 countries, and has been certified gold in Canada, Italy, Spain and in the United Kingdom. It was nominated for Best Dance/Electronic Album at the 69th Annual Grammy Awards and won Best Album at the 2026 MTV Video Music Awards.

== Background and development ==
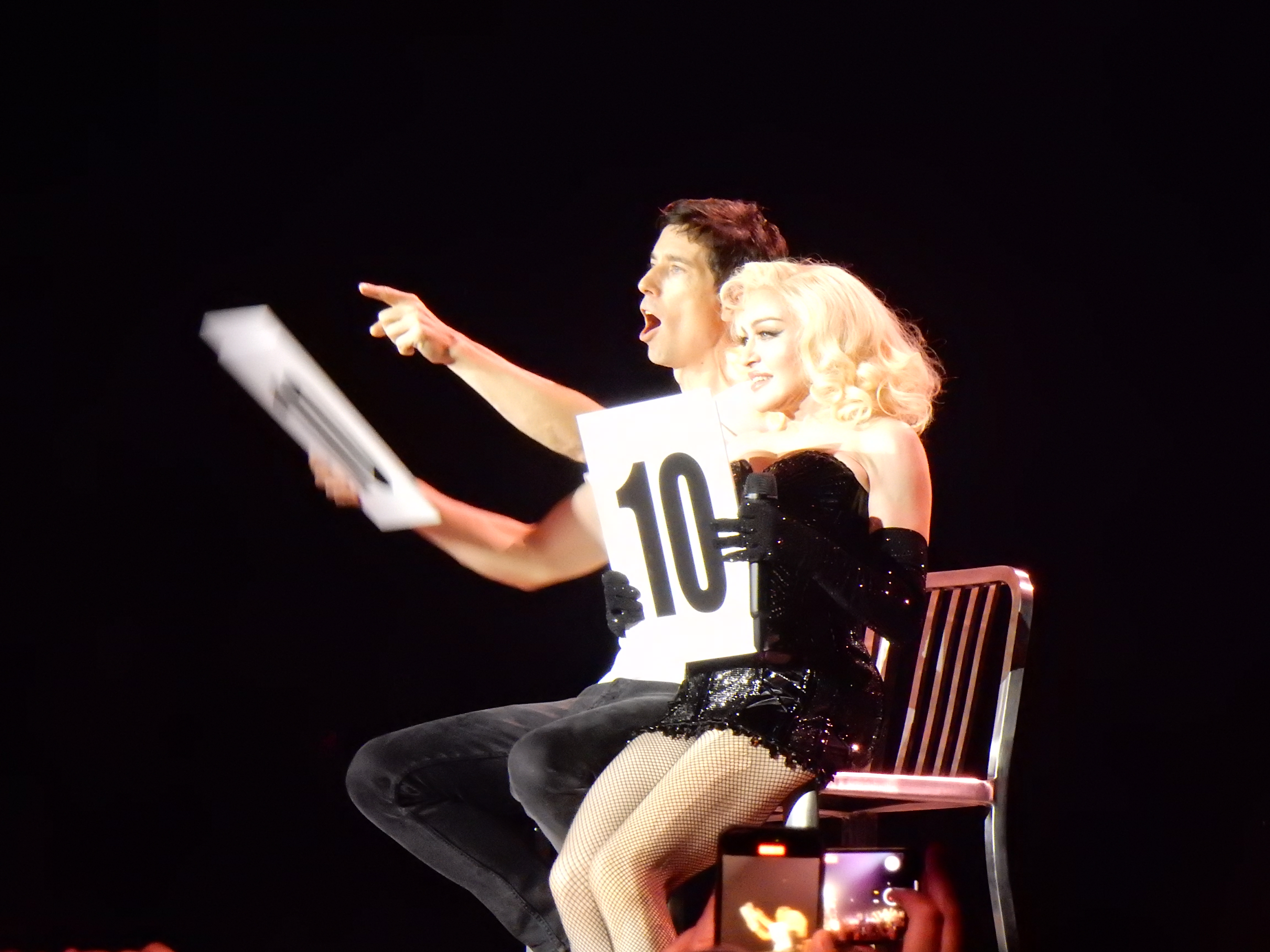
Madonna with Stuart Price during the Celebration Tour in Antwerp, 2023. Price was the tour's musical director and served as opening act for selected concerts.

In 2005, Madonna released the studio album Confessions on a Dance Floor, recorded mainly with Stuart Price in his London flat. It was a dance-pop album with disco influences, recorded in a non-stop mix. Before its release, Price secretly tested the tracks they were creating by slipping instrumental dubs into his DJ sets. During its promotion, Madonna played a series of intimate performances in nightclubs. The album met with critical acclaim and won Best Electronic/Dance Album at the 49th Annual Grammy Awards.

After finishing promotion of Confessions on a Dance Floor, Madonna did not speak with Price for about 15 years. In 2023, she hired him as a musical director for the Celebration Tour, her retrospective concert series. After finishing the tour, she resumed working on her biographical film, which was ultimately scrapped by Universal Pictures due to budget constraints. Afterwards, Netflix reached out to her about creating a television series based on her life, but its development got longer while she was trying to find a proper showrunner. She decided to make a dance album as a distraction from waiting for both projects to materialize. Feeling that "the world is in a very dark place and people need to dance", she reached out to Price to record a sequel of Confessions on a Dance Floor. Previously, she wanted to record an album with other producers and "have other experiences", but their collaborative work on the Celebration Tour made them remember "how much we loved working with each other, how aligned we are not only sonically but also intellectually and emotionally".

In September 2024, Madonna announced on her Instagram account that she was working on new music with Price. The following February, she confirmed that her new music was a follow-up to Confessions on a Dance Floor and teased its release in 2025. She continued to document the recording sessions on social media, posting pictures in the studio with Price throughout 2025. In September 2025, she announced a reunion with her original record label of over 25 years, Warner Records, with the album slated for release in 2026. In the same month, she revealed the titles of two songs from the album: "Fragile" and "Forgive Yourself", in a podcast interview on an episode of On Purpose with Jay Shetty. Additionally, in advance of the sequel album, she released a twentieth anniversary edition of Confessions on a Dance Floor on streaming and digital retailers in November 2025.

== Writing and recording ==
Madonna moved from New York City to London, where she started working with Price in his studio in Maida Vale. She described the creative process as "medicine for my soul" and said that songwriting allows for full artistic freedom without having to "ask anyone for their permission". During the initial one week session in London they wrote "Good for the Soul". Afterwards, they moved to Bentley Studios in New York City, where "I Feel So Free" was recorded. According to Price, during the second week of recording they decided that their sound was reminiscent of Confessions on a Dance Floor. While its re-release was planned, they thought the new album has "got to be as good as or better than this".

The album was inspired by the illnesses of Madonna's brother, Christopher Ciccone, and stepmother, Joan Ciccone, both of whom died in 2024. She started working on the album by writing songs about family trauma. She wrote "Fragile" right after a phone conversation with Christopher, calling the experience "cathartic" and "like an exorcism". Her daughter, Lourdes Leon, approached her to create a song together, which became their first music collaboration. They co-wrote "The Test", with Madonna describing it as a "healing moment" between them, which "solidified the idea that now is the time to make" the album. She approached Sabrina Carpenter over an Instagram direct message to record a collaboration for the album, which ended up being "Bring Your Love". She also collaborated with Dutch DJ and music producer Martin Garrix on "Bizarre". Belgian musician Stromae provided guest vocals on "My Sins Are My Savior".

The album was recorded for about a year and a half. Madonna revealed that she recorded eight additional songs that did not make it onto the album, including "What Will Save Me" with Price and Arca, but added that she hopes to release the extra songs in the future.

== Composition ==
We must dance, celebrate, and pray with our bodies. These are things that we've been doing for thousands of years—they really are spiritual practices. After all, the dance floor is a ritualistic space. It's a place where you connect—with your wounds, with your fragility. To rave is an art. It's about pushing your limits and connecting to a community of like-minded people. Sound, light, and vibration/ Reshape our perceptions/ Pulling us into a trance-like state. The repetition of the bass, we don't just hear it but we feel it. Altering our consciousness and dissolving ego and time.

— Madonna's and Price's "manifesto" about the album's concept

Confessions II is primarily a blend of EDM, house, dance-pop, synth-pop and disco, but also features more downtempo songs. Nick Levine of NME described it as Madonna's "most full-on dance record". Rolling Stone's Rob Sheffield felt it was "drawing from all over the history of dance music", while Jeff Nelson from People called it an "aural odyssey that celebrates dance music's history", exploring its sub-genres. Pitchfork's Shaad D'Souza opined that Madonna incorporates the genres that she "has never touched", like acid house, French house and 2-step garage, calling it the "variegated, blended vision of vintage club music". According to Alexis Petridis of The Guardian, the downtempo songs reference the work of Mo' Wax label due to "breakbeats, misty atmospherics, crackling vinyl [and] muted orchestrations". Madonna and Price pointed to Detroit techno and Chicago house as their inspirations for the record. It was released as a non-stop mix in the style of DJ mix, echoing Confessions on a Dance Floor. Price revealed the mixing was done "against the grain of what is expected" in the era of music streaming services, where "your song can be for two and a half minutes and then it must stop".

Madonna described that many of the songs on the album were "confessional", but she "curated the record based on how much it made me move". According to her, its main themes are consciousness and freedom, which she explained: "Dance floors are a ritualistic space where you are free in your body and mind, you let go of anxiety and hopefully it elevates you to a higher level of consciousness." Eric Henderson of Slant Magazine interpreted the album as the place where "two lineages – the dark id and the transcendent omniscience – finally brush skin on the dance floor". He compared the "reset-and-rebirth drive" to Madonna's 1998 album Ray of Light, adding that she "actually seems relieved" about its discoveries. The Irish Times' Ed Power described the album as the reassessment of Madonna's belief that "the dance floor is a place both of bliss and escapism and of emotional growth and self-realisation". The Independent's Roisin O'Connor pointed out "catharsis, release, and the freedom that comes with that" as the album's main themes. Katie Bain from Billboard interpreted the album as a focus on "the club as church and dancing as spiritual work", while Variety's Steven J. Horowitz called it a celebration of "the thrill of the dance floor while embracing its mystique". Paolo Ragusa of Consequence felt it was an attempt to revive the "self-reflexive vibrance" of Confessions on a Dance Floor, centered on "the dance floor as a space for transcendence and spiritual awakening". The Wall Street Journal's Mark Richardson felt it presented "music as a religious calling more than a form of entertainment." The album features multiple spoken word passages. Richardson described them as "brief ambient interludes, during which Madonna often offers spiritual incantations about the healing power of music".

Sheffield opined that the album's three first songs are "a 12-minute suite where [Madonna] rides the electro-throb beat while pondering the inner neediness that drives her to the floor". Similarly, Power felt the album opens with "what is essentially a 20-minute suite of tracks built around a looping barrage of house beats" and subsequently goes into a "melancholic worldview, caught in the relentless tractor beam of Madonna's nostalgia". Henderson described its first half as communion and its second half as reckoning, driven by the "crisis of conscience". D'Souza felt that the album's first two thirds is "fixated on love and its healing powers", while the final five songs are "fixated on death and inherited trauma". Horowitz opined that in the last songs Madonna "faces the comedown after the ecstasy and grapples with the heaviness of reality".

=== Songs ===
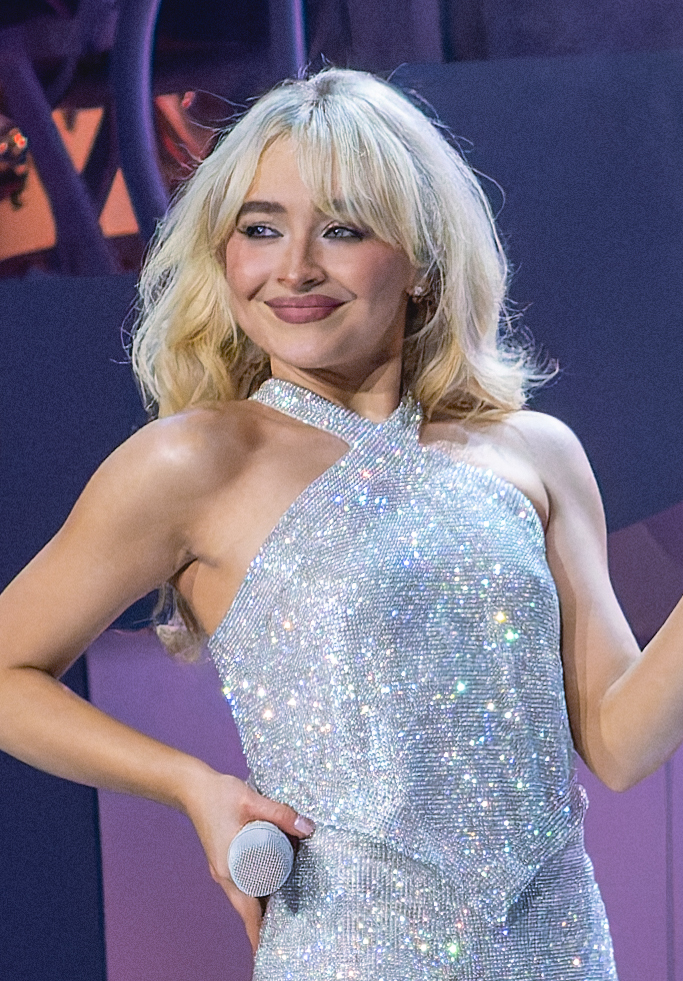
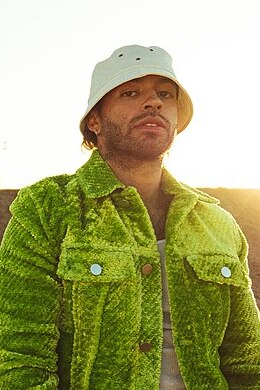
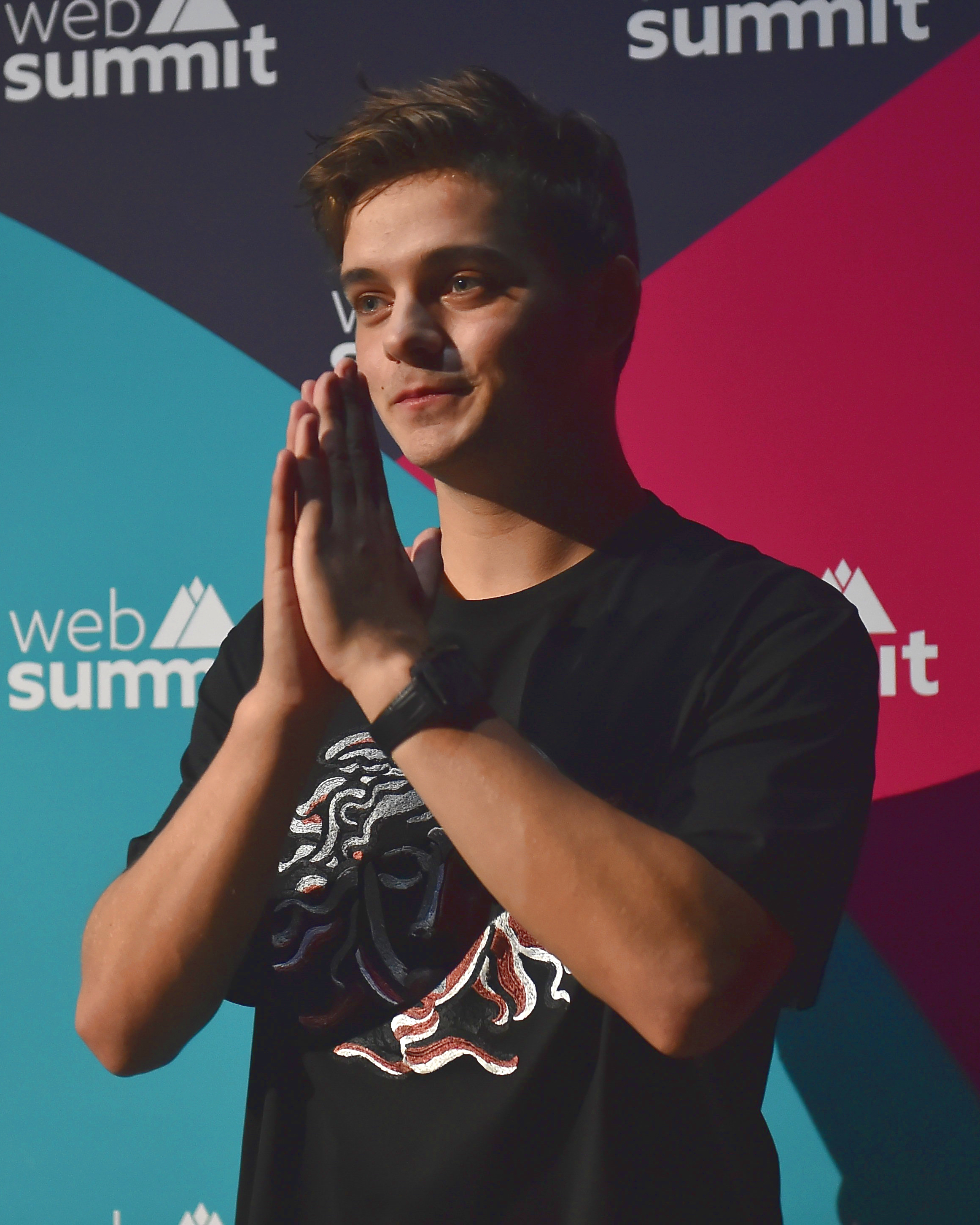
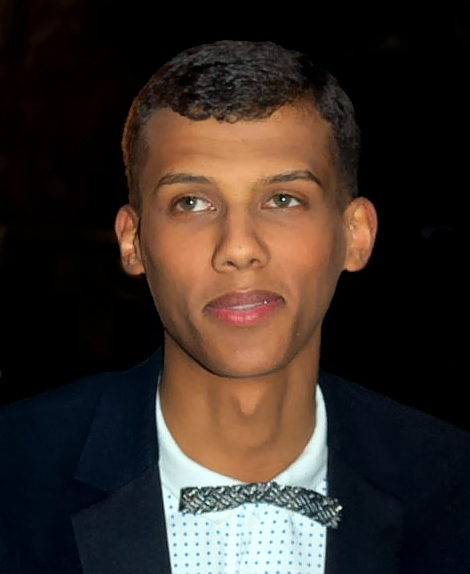
Guest features on the album include Sabrina Carpenter, Feid, Martin Garrix, and Stromae.

"I Feel So Free" is a deep house and post-disco song, on which Madonna is "half-singing, half-whispering". Billboard's Joe Lynch pointed out its "sensual whisper atop an arpeggiated volley of retro synths and soothing soundscapes." The lyrics refer to the dance floor and creating "a new persona", with Madonna proclaiming "that the only place she can truly be herself is in the anonymity of a crowded disco." She described the song as a "little confessional moment", inspired by the difficulty of trusting people and understanding her place in the world. It samples the acid house song "French Kiss" (1989) by Lil Louis, and received comparisons to Madonna's 2005 song "Future Lovers" and the work of Donna Summer. "Good for the Soul" is an electronica, UK garage and trance song with strings, beginning with Madonna speaking "Everything begins with consciousness". Lynch interpretated it as a "message of dance music's power to succor the soul", referring to Madonna's near-death experience in 2023, while Evelyn McDonnell from The New York Times felt it was an explanation of the "cosmology of a rave". "One Step Away" is an EDM and trance song featuring strings, percussion, piano, synths, and chord that has funk influences. According to Billboard, it begins with the manifesto about dance music and dancefloor as a "ritualistic space where movement replaces language". Critics compared it to the work of Mondo Grosso and Mr. Fingers, as well as Madonna's "2000s electronic heyday".

"Bring Your Love", a duet with Carpenter, is a house and dance-pop song, interpolating Inner City's 1988 song "Good Life". It received comparisons to Madonna's song "Vogue" (1990). The lyrics address criticisms about Madonna's and Carpenter's public personas, which was inspired by Madonna's reluctance to think about the charts and streaming numbers. "Danceteria" is a disco, electroclash and French house song, which interpolates the hook from Lou Reed's "Walk on the Wild Side". It was inspired by Madonna's early days and partying at the Danceteria. In the lyrics, she mentions people from the 1980s New York City downtown scene, which was compared to the spoken section from "Vogue". "Read My Lips" is an eurodance and Latin pop song about failed love and lies, featuring Spanish guitar and Batucada drums. It features a Spanish-language verse by Feid. "Everything" is a house and techno song about finding "the greatest light" among "the greatest amount of darkness". According to Bain, it "bridges the gap between processing the sadness of the world and trying to avoid it via clubland escapism". Levine compared it to Madonna's 1990 song "Justify My Love".

"Love Sensation" is a house and disco track with electronica sounds, compared to the work of Kylie Minogue and Daft Punk. Its main theme is the healing power of love, while Madonna described it as "just joy". "Love Without Words" is a multilayered, experimental house song with an acid house line and an Italo disco-infused drop. Called an "ode to dance music" by Ragusa, it features Madonna singing about the transcendence and repeating "come into the club". "Bizarre", recorded in a collaboration with Martin Garrix, is a love song about a "movie star with deep blue eyes", according to BBC. It features baroque synth strings and received comparisons to the work of Eurythmics. "School" is an experimental synth-pop and techno song, which features Madonna asking to teach her something she doesn't already know, interpreted by Bain as a euphemism for sexual education. She compared it to Madonna's albums Erotica (1992) and Bedtime Stories (1994). "Fragile" is a drum and bass and 2-step garage song based on an acoustic guitar and synth strings, described by Levine as a "rave ballad". It was inspired by Madonna's relationship with her estranged late brother Christopher Ciccone. She sings about their childhood, estrangement and reconciliation. According to Lucy O'Brien, the song is about fallibility and forgiveness, with a "sense of acceptance".

"My Sins Are My Savior" is a hip house piano song, with samples from "My Army of Lovers" (1991), performed by Army of Lovers. It was described by Sheffield as a "Catholic exorcism". It features Stromae's legato singing in French, which was compared by Petridis to the work of Serge Gainsbourg. Madonna revealed the song was inspired by "narrow-minded people who are ignorant, who judge first before investigating". It received comparisons to Erotica, Madonna's 1994 song "Bedtime Story" and the collaborative work of Brian Eno and David Byrne. "Betrayal" is a minimalistic trip hop song with a trumpet and an interpolation from Erik Satie's Gnossienne No. 1. Its lyrics are about Madonna's troubled relationship with her late stepmother, Joan Ciccone. "The Test", a trip hop and ambient duet with Madonna's daughter Lola Leon, describes the ways Madonna's fame affected them. Critics from Slant Magazine, Pitchfork, and The Guardian felt it was a sequel to Madonna's 1998 song "Little Star", which was also written about Leon. The last track, "L.E.S. Girl", describes Madonna's memories of pre-stardom musical life in New York City and ends with repeated line "everything fades away". Described as a "dreamy lullaby", it features acoustic guitar and received comparisons with Ray of Light.

== Release ==
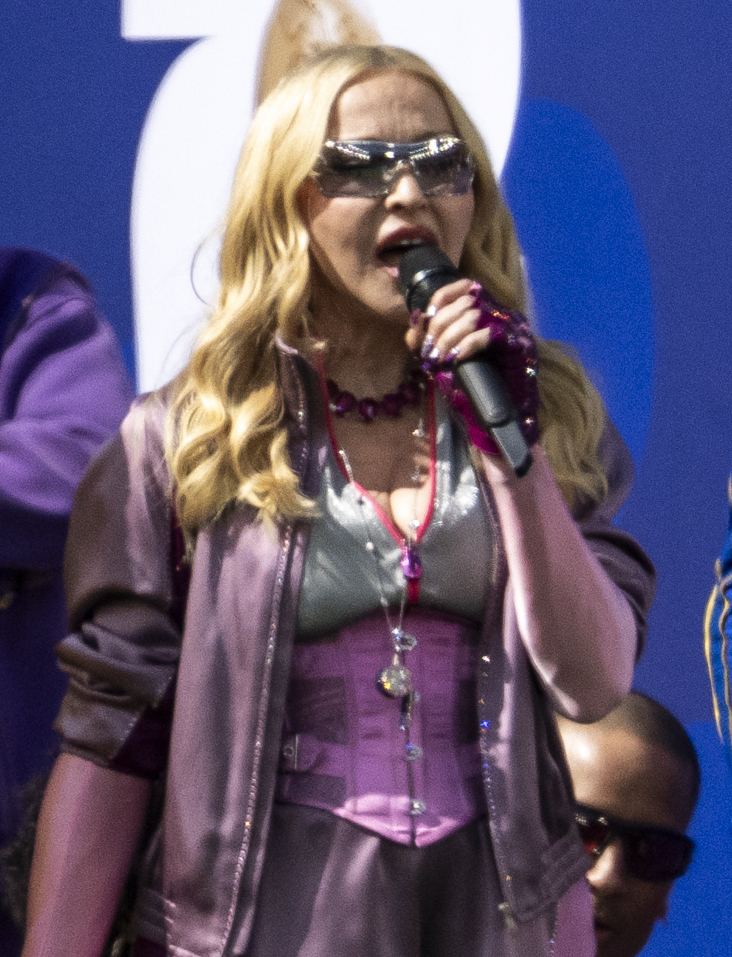
Madonna performing during the 2026 FIFA World Cup final halftime show, on which she interpolated elements of "Danceteria".

On April 14, 2026, Madonna cleared her Instagram profile and uploaded a blurred profile picture. Her website was updated to display a series of designs, followed by a static image of a silver speaker in between Madonna's legs. In the photo, she was wearing a "glittery update" to custom-made lace-up Yves Saint Laurent boots from the first Confessions era. The following day, Madonna officially announced Confessions II on Instagram. Simultaneously, its preorder started, including CD, vinyl and cassette, and wheatpaste posters appeared in major cities. On May 14, 2026, the standard track list for the album had appeared on posters in major global cities, containing 12 tracks.

On April 24, 2026, Madonna announced an exclusive picture disc vinyl edition of the album as a part of her partnership with Grindr. On May 27, 2026, she announced exclusive limited-edition vinyl version as a part of her partnership with Bilt Rewards, released exclusively for member release night parties. On June 29, 2026, she announced a limited edition vinyl, distributed exclusively on the TikTok House of Confessions events. She also released several alternative digital versions of the album. The Icon Edition includes an additional song "Hot Sauce", released as a part of her partnership with Absolut Vodka. The Film Edition includes the Confessions II film, Instrumentals edition includes instrumental versions, the Grindr Edition includes live recordings from the Times Square promotional concert and the Afterhours Edition includes remixes. The album was released in fifteen vinyl, four CD, one cassette and six digital editions. On November 9, 2026, Madonna announced Confessions on a Dance Floor Parts I & II, a boxset with both albums repackaged, scheduled to be released in March 2027.

=== Artwork and packaging ===
The album's visuals, including the cover and lead imagery, were photographed by Rafael Pavarotti, under styling by Ib Kamara and creative direction by Raw Materials. Madonna commented that she was drawn by Pavarotti's "distinctive style" and ability to bring people's personality out in bold colors. New York City-based studio Special Offer, Inc. designed Confessions II's artwork and packaging. It uses a bright pink, red, and purple color scheme to echo the Confessions on a Dance Floor album art. The digital and deluxe edition employs an "editorial look", with "Madonna" and "Confessions II" written in Helvetica.

Wanting to reference the artwork of Confessions on a Dance Floor, Madonna wore similar clothes, including Yves Saint Laurent boots and Gucci jackets. On the cover, she is perched on a platform of speakers in a lavender lace bodysuit and matching fishnet stockings with a contrasting pink veil over her head. While doing the fittings, she found the veil and decided to wear it for the photoshoot. She referenced the cover as "a kind of religious image, a revelation", comparing her image to the saint Madonna.

== Promotion ==
=== Marketing ===
On April 24, 2026, Madonna's partnership with geosocial networking app Grindr to promote the album campaign was revealed, introducing exclusive behind the scene content. Her image referring the album's artwork along with a voice message were displayed in the app. Starting on May 1, 2026, the album's commercial starring Madonna and Anna Wintour, filmed during the Dolce & Gabbana fashion show in Milan, was shown in selected theaters ahead of The Devil Wears Prada 2. On June 12, 2026, Madonna announced a partnership with Absolut Vodka called Absolut Icon, featuring a menu of four different cocktails available in various bars, clubs, and nightlife venues made with Absolut Tabasco, inspired by the album. An alternative version of "Read My Lips", subtitled FIFA version, was released on June 25, 2026, on the bonus edition of Official FIFA World Cup 2026 Album, the official compilation album of the 2026 FIFA World Cup. On the following day, BBC One aired the television special Madonna & Graham, in which Madonna was interviewed by Graham Norton at the Koko in London, with guest appearances by Price and Kylie Minogue.

On June 29, 2026, Madonna announced a promotional partnership with social networking service TikTok. As a part of collaboration, she hosted an interactive event on July 2, 2026, in London, with exclusive first listen to the album, live streamed by iHeartRadio radio stations and on TikTok. It drew over 2.1 million viewers worldwide on TikTok, becoming the most-watched standalone live stream in the service's history. On July 3 and July 4, 2026, TikTok held the immersive events TikTok House of Confessions in New York City and London, featuring exclusive merchandise and content creation opportunities inspired by the album.

=== Singles and promotional singles ===
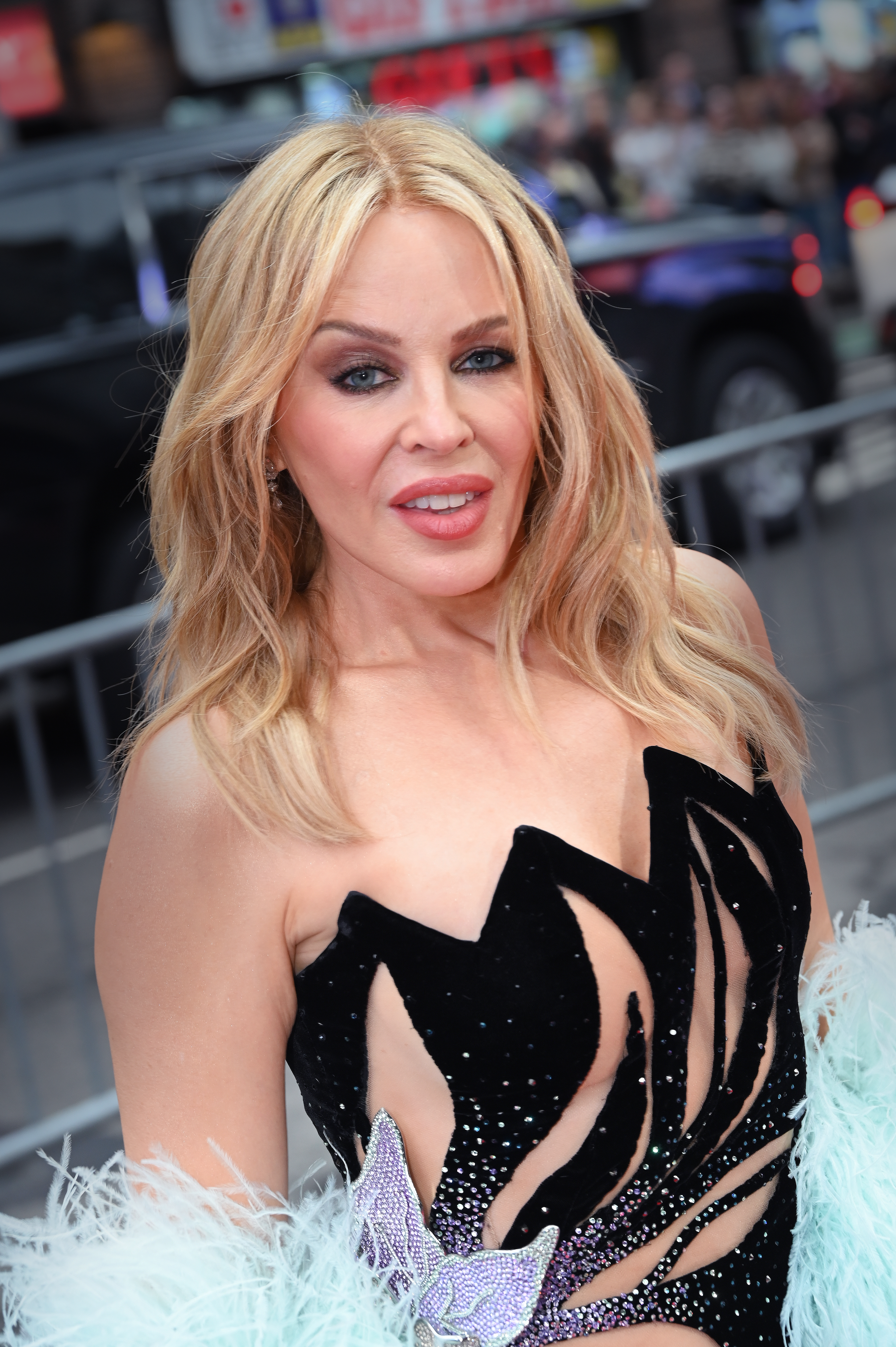
Kylie Minogue appears on the remix of "Love Sensation".

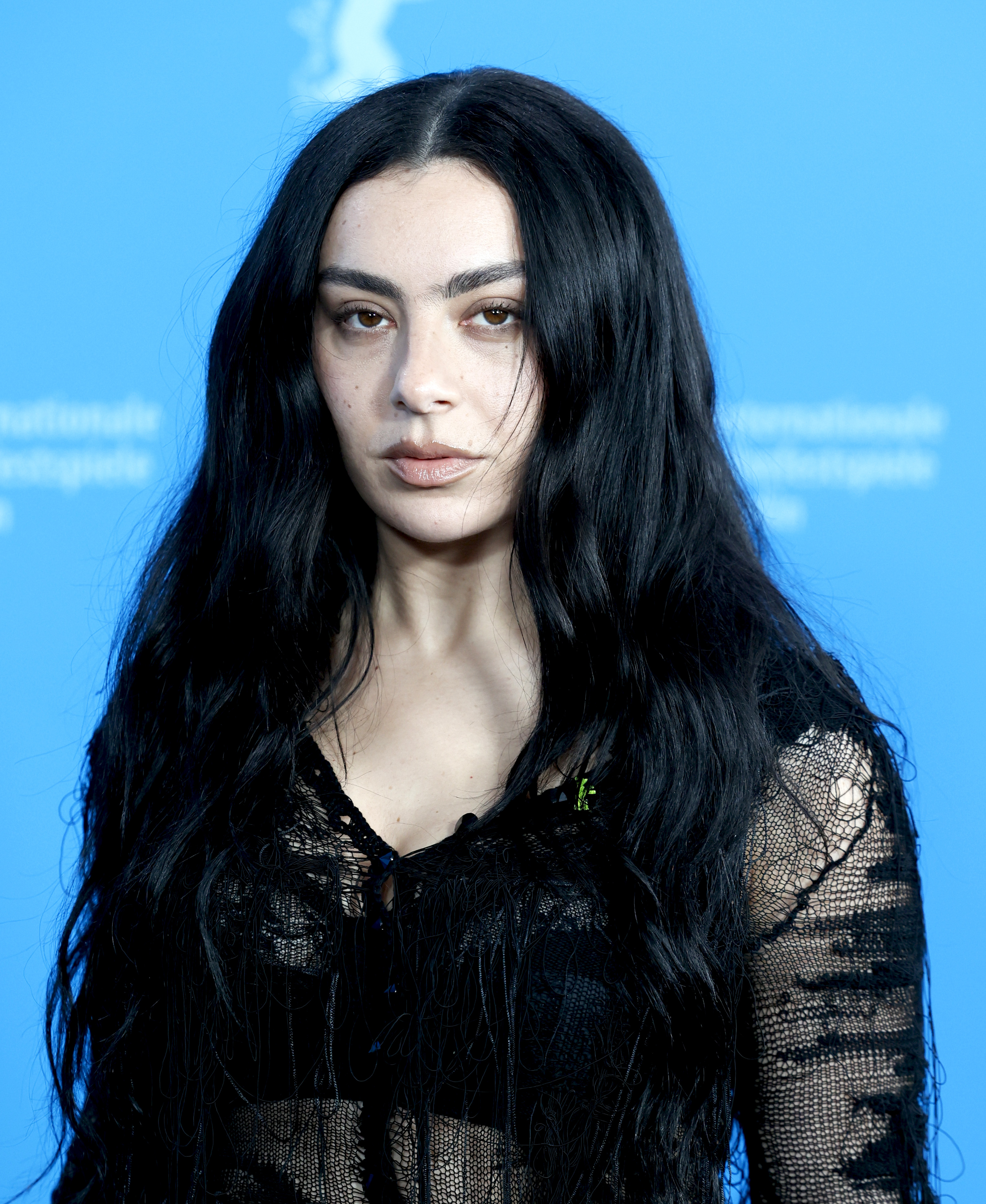
Charli XCX appears on the remix of "Danceteria".

Madonna previewed the opening track "I Feel So Free" in a 60-second video alongside the album's announcement. The full song premiered on iHeartRadio's Pride Radio on April 17, 2026, and subsequently was released on all streaming and digital download platforms the following day. The song topped the Dance/Mix Show Airplay chart, becoming Madonna's first number-one hit on a Billboard radio chart in 18 years.

"Bring Your Love" with Carpenter was released as the album's lead single on April 30, 2026. In the U.S. the song was released to hot adult contemporary radio on May 4, and contemporary hit radio the following day. The accompanying music video premiered on June 15, 2026. The song reached number 91 on the Billboard Global 200 and number 74 on the Billboard Hot 100. In the United Kingdom, it reached number 29 on the UK singles chart and debuted at number one on the UK Airplay Chart, becoming Madonna's first song in 18 years to be included on BBC Radio 1's A-List playlist. Additionally, it topped the Italy airplay chart and reached top 20 on the Spain airplay chart and in Wallonia. The song received two nominations for the 2026 MTV Video Music Awards, winning Best Collaboration.

"Love Sensation" was released as the second single on June 4, 2026. Its remix with Australian singer Kylie Minogue was released on August 6, 2026. The song reached number one on the Dance Airplay chart. It peaked at number eight on the UK singles chart, becoming Madonna's highest entry since 2009.

The third single, "Danceteria" was released on July 10, 2026. A remix with British singer Charli XCX titled "Danceteria Afterhours" was released on September 24, 2026. The song reached number one at the Dance Airplay chart. In the United Kingdom, it reached number 22 on the UK singles chart, making Confessions II Madonna's first album since Hard Candy (2008) to have three top 40 songs.

=== Live performances and appearances ===
On April 17, 2026, Madonna joined Sabrina Carpenter on the main stage at Coachella 2026 as a surprise guest, where they performed "Bring Your Love" prior to its release, along with "Vogue" and "Like a Prayer". On June 4, 2026, she played a surprise, free Pride Month concert at the Square in Times Square, produced and live streamed by Grindr. She performed "I Feel So Free", "Bring Your Love" and "Love Sensation", along with three Confessions on a Dance Floor songs. On June 13, 2026, Garrix debuted the song "Bizarre" during his performance at Barclays Center in Brooklyn, New York. On July 19, 2026, Madonna included elements of "Danceteria" in her performance of "Music" during the 2026 FIFA World Cup final halftime show. On September 27, 2026, she opened the 2026 MTV Video Music Awards with the medley of "Bring Your Love" with Carpenter and "Danceteria Afterhours" with Charli XCX, marking her first performance on the VMA since 2003. On April 10 and 17, 2027, she is set to perform in the Dance Tent at Coachella 2027.

Madonna and Price embarked on the series of club parties, Club Confessions, during which they played songs from the album. The first private party took place on April 25, 2026, at the Abbey in West Hollywood, California, and included previews of "Love Sensation" and "One Step Away". The second private party, which took place on June 23, 2026 at the Paradis Latin in Paris. It was co-hosted by Anthony Vaccarello and included Arca previewing her remix of "The Test". The third party was organized on July 2, 2026 at Magazine London in London, with tickets available to buy via Madonna's website. The fourth party was held on July 11, 2026 at the Knockdown Center in New York City. The fifth party was held on August 1, 2026 at the AFAS Live in Amsterdam as a part of WorldPride during the Pride Amsterdam. Kylie Minogue joined Madonna and Price onstage during "Love Sensation".

=== Accompanying film ===
An accompanying musical film, Confessions II, was directed by Torso (David Toro and Solomon Chase). Built around the first six songs in the track listing, it stars Madonna, with appearances by Arca, Archie Madekwe, Benedict Cumberbatch, Carpenter, Cole Palmer, Mazar, Gwendoline Christie, Honey Dijon, Feid, João Pedro, Julia Garner, Kate Moss, Odessa A'zion, Richard E. Grant, Shygirl, and Lourdes Leon. The film premiered on June 5, 2026, at the Beacon Theatre in New York City, during the Tribeca Festival, which also featured an interview with Anderson Cooper. It was released on YouTube on June 8, 2026. It received nine nominations for the 2026 MTV Video Music Awards, including Video of the Year, winning Best Dance, Best Long Form Video, Best Cinematography and Best Choreography.

== Critical reception ==
Professional ratings
Aggregate scores
Source	Rating
AnyDecentMusic?	7.4/10
Metacritic	82/100
Review scores
Source	Rating
AllMusic	4.5/5 stars
The Arts Desk	3/5 stars
The Daily Telegraph	4/5 stars
The Guardian	4/5 stars
The Independent	4/5 stars
NME	4/5 stars
Pitchfork	8.1/10
Rolling Stone	4/5 stars
Slant Magazine	4.5/5 stars
The Times	4/5 stars

Confessions II received critical acclaim from critics. (Note: Attributed to multiple sources:) According to the review aggregator Metacritic, Confessions II received "universal acclaim" based on a weighted average score of 82 out of 100 from eighteen critic scores. The review aggregator site AnyDecentMusic? compiled twenty-one reviews and gave the album a weighted average score of 7.4 out of 10, based on their assessment of the critical consensus. Multiple critics called it Madonna's best album since Confessions on a Dance Floor. (Note: Reviewers from Billboard, The Guardian, The Independent, musicOMH, NME, Pitchfork, Rolling Stone, Shatter the Standards, Variety, Vulture, and The Wall Street Journal.)

Mark Savage from BBC News felt that the album offered Madonna's most revealing work since Ray of Light and said it "really soars when it gets autobiographical". The Times' critic Will Hodgkinson believed Confessions II to be one of Madonna's most personal albums to date, writing that it "goes to the heart" of who she is. Henderson of Slant Magazine described it as Madonna's most focused and cohesive album in decades, calling it her most "galvanizing" statement since Confessions on a Dance Floor. Nelson from People deemed it Madonna's best album in decades, adding it "masterfully employs all the signatures [...] of a classic Madonna record". The Irish Times's Power called it Madonna's most confident record in years. Robin Murray of Clash described it as a "groundbreaking moment" in Madonna's career and "her most energetic and downright irresistible album in over a decade". Pitchfork's D'Souza called the album "not just a passable album but an excellent one" and praised Madonna's pop instincts and emotional sharpness, describing it as one of the strongest reinventions of her career. Neil Z. Yeung of AllMusic called it her best album in decades, praising the lyrical depth and production quality.

Petridis of The Guardian deemed it a "nostalgic dancefloor trip" and suggested that its engagement with Madonna's past could benefit her future work. In her review for Mojo, Lucy O'Brien felt that the album reconnected Madonna with her club roots after a long gap, calling it a record of "shamanic force". The Independent's O'Connor deemed it "a celebration of the dance floor", which is "engineered to make you move, or indeed, sweat". Levine of NME opined that most of the album succeeded because it showed Madonna as an "uncommonly talented club kid" still deeply connected to dance music. Sheffield of Rolling Stone wrote that Madonna revisits youthful dreams to conquer the planet and "demonstrates smashingly how she made them come all true". Crack's Alim Kheraj called the album "both cohesive and multifaceted" and a "work of a master reasserting herself after a period of exile", comparing it to her releases which followed Confessions of a Dance Floor. Sam Rosenberg of Paste deemed it Madonna's return to form and "the most alive and present she's sounded in ages". Vulture's Craig Jenkins opined it "pulls [Madonna] back into vaunted space with hook-writing powers on a level that exceeds her work" on the last three albums.

Billboard's Bain and Joe Lynch wrote that Madonna "comfortably veers between insecurity and omnipotence, candor and camp", while Bain separately called the album "a stunner" and praised its 2020s take on club music, which evoked earlier eras without falling into pastiche. Variety critic Horowitz called the album a celebration of the dance floor's thrill and mystique, and felt that it showed Madonna still "reigning over the dance floor". John Earls of Classic Pop believed that the album reminded listeners why Madonna "absolutely ruled pop music for so long", while Jason Landry of Soundwaves felt that it highlighted her "classic vocals and infectious beats" and reaffirmed her status as the Queen of Pop and a dance-floor figure. The Wall Street Journal's Richardson called it a "strong dance set with real variety and relentless drive". The Daily Telegraph chief music critic Neil McCormick wrote that the sequel did not quite match the original but remained strong enough to continue the concept, and added that it reaffirmed Madonna's status as a long-standing dance-pop figure. Ludovic Hunter-Tilney of the Financial Times felt that the album had a sense of purpose absent from her music since 2005, although he believed that none of its songs reached the level of "Hung Up".

In a more mixed review, Ragusa of Consequence felt that Confessions II "throws a great party, but has little to say" and it did not deliver the transcendence which is mentioned in the lyrics. The Observer's Kitty Empire felt that the album's dancefloor-as-refuge theme remained effective, but argued that a fresher approach could have elevated a very good record into a great one. John Murphy of MusicOMH wrote that "the Queen of Pop is still very much on her throne", but felt that the first half's energy was petering out towards the end. The Arts Desk's Thomas H. Green headlined that the album mingled "the generic with nuggets of gold". He further referred to the album as a "bold, righteous affront to those who would place pop culture's veteran female performers in desexualised boxes", but felt it lacked "contemplative, unselfconsciously older Madonna". Spencer Kornhaber of The Atlantic deemed it a "perfectly okay summer soundtrack". However, he criticized the songwriting and opined that the album sounded like AI. Jeffrey Davies of PopMatters gave Confessions II a five out of ten rating, arguing that it lacked innovation. He wrote that Madonna was on "autopilot" and that the album reinforced nostalgia rather than advancing the Confessions concept. Spectrum Culture's Thomas Britt rated the album 48 out of 100, arguing that it failed to justify its dance-as-salvation premise, describing much of it as "painfully monotonous" despite noting some stronger moments. In August 2026, Pitchfork placed Confessions II on their ranking of the best music of 2026 so far.

== Commercial performance ==
On its first day of release, Confessions II received 13,068,922 streams on Spotify. This marked the platform's biggest opening for a solo female artist whose career began in the 1980s at the latest and the second-biggest debut for any solo artist who debuted before 2000, behind Shakira's Las Mujeres Ya No Lloran (2024). Confessions II reached number one on the official charts of 17 countries.

In the United States, Confessions II debuted at number one on the Billboard 200, with 134,000 album-equivalent units earned in its first week, consisting of 114,000 pure sales, 19,000 streaming-equivalent units, and 1,000 track-equivalent units. It marked Madonna's best sales week for an album since Billboard switched to measuring album-equivalent units in 2014, and her biggest streaming week for an album. She became the first act with a number one album in the 2020s to have also topped the chart in three other decades. Confessions II was her tenth number-one album in the United States, making her the fourth act to have at least ten number-ones on both Billboard 200 and Billboard Hot 100. With 59,000 vinyl albums sold in its first week, Confessions II marked Madonna's best vinyl sales week for an album since 1991, when Luminate started tracking sales. It dropped out of that chart on its sixth week. In Canada, the album opened at number one on the Billboard Canadian Albums chart. On September 25, 2026, it was certified gold by Music Canada.

In the United Kingdom, it entered at number one on the UK Albums Chart, with 48,502 album-equivalent units earned in its first week, consisting of 35,445 physical copies, 6,577 downloads, and 6,480 sales-equivalent streams. The album surpassed the 27,227 first week units earned by her previous studio album, Madame X (2019), on its first day of release, achieving her highest first-week sales since her last number-one album in the country, MDNA (2012). Madonna became the first American female artist to chart a number-one album in the country across five decades. Confessions II was her thirteenth number-one album in the United Kingdom, tying her with Elvis Presley for the fourth-highest total of number-one albums among all acts. It spent six weeks on the chart, and charted at number one on the UK Dance Albums chart for six weeks. On July 24, 2026, the album was certified silver by the British Phonographic Industry (BPI).

In France, it arrived at number one on the SNEP Albums Chart with 25,491 album-equivalent units, marking the highest debut of 2026 for both an album by a female artist and a pop album. Confessions II also became Madonna's first number-one album in France since Hard Candy (2008). In Spain, it entered at number one on the albums chart, with 10,875 album-equivalent units, becoming Madonna's tenth chart-topper. It was certified gold by the Productores de Música de España. In Italy, it debuted atop the FIMI Albums Chart and was certified gold by the Federazione Industria Musicale Italiana. Across Europe, it reached number one in Austria, Belgium (both Flanders and Wallonia), Finland, Greece, Hungary, Netherlands, Portugal, and Switzerland, as well as at number two in Germany, Ireland, Poland and Sweden. Within Australia, the album entered at number one on the ARIA Albums Chart, becoming Madonna's thirteenth chart-topping album and giving her the fourth-highest total of number-one albums among all acts. In New Zealand, it debuted at number two on the Aotearoa Top 40 Albums. Confessions II debuted at number one on the Croatian International Album Chart, and remained at number one for eight non-consecutive weeks.

== Accolades ==
Madonna received thirtheen nominations for the 2026 MTV Video Music Awards, tying Lady Gaga's 2010 record for the most nominations for an artist in a single year. During the ceremony, she won seven awards, the most among all performers, including Artist of the Year and Best Album. At the 69th Annual Grammy Awards, Confessions II was nominated for Best Dance/Electronic Album, while its songs earned four nominations.

Awards and nominations
Award	Date	Category	Result	Ref.
Queerty Awards	March 10, 2026	Next Big Thing	Nominated	
MTV Video Music Awards	September 27, 2026	Best Album	Won	
Los 40 Music Awards	November 20, 2026	Best International Album	Nominated	
Prêmio Claro Música	December 2026	International Album of the Year	Pending	
Grammy Awards	February 7, 2027	Best Dance/Electronic Album	Pending	

== Track listing ==
Standard edition
No.	Title	Writer(s)	Producer(s)	Length
1.	"I Feel So Free"	Madonna; Stuart Price; Marvin L. Burns	Madonna; Price	4:59
2.	"Good for the Soul"	Madonna; Price	Madonna; Price	3:08
3.	"One Step Away"	Madonna; Price	Madonna; Price	4:23
4.	"Bring Your Love" (with Sabrina Carpenter)	Madonna; Price; Roy Holman; Shanna Jackson; Kevin Saunderson	Madonna; Price	3:42
5.	"Danceteria"	Madonna; Andrew Watt; Henry Walter; Jeremiah Patrick Lordan; Price; Lou Reed	Madonna; Watt; Cirkut; Price	3:55
6.	"Read My Lips" (with Feid)	Madonna; Price; Marcos Masis; Salomón Villada Hoyos	Madonna; Price; Tainy	4:46
7.	"Everything"	Madonna; Price	Madonna; Price	4:09
8.	"Love Sensation"	Madonna; Price	Madonna; Price	3:47
9.	"Love Without Words"	Madonna; Price	Madonna; Price	4:20
10.	"Bizarre" (with Martin Garrix)	Madonna; Martijn Garritsen; Oskar Rindborg; Wilhelm Börjesson; Taylor Upsahl; Price	Madonna; Martin Garrix; Osrin; Price	4:05
11.	"School"	Madonna; Price; Lanita LaShonda Smith; Scott M. Carter; Mustapha M. Mbiakop; Matthew Fonson; Jessica Ashley Karpov	Madonna; Price; Smith; Triangle Park; Mustapha LeBeau	4:23
12.	"Fragile"	Madonna; Price	Madonna; Price	4:19
13.	"My Sins Are My Savior" (featuring Stromae)	Madonna; Price; Paul Van Haver; Magnus Baard; Lars Hakansson; Anders Hansson; Tim Norell; Per Thyrén	Madonna; Price	3:20
14.	"Betrayal"	Madonna; Price; Mirwais; Erik Satie	Madonna; Price; Mirwais	4:08
15.	"The Test" (with Lola Leon)	Madonna; Price; Lourdes Leon	Madonna; Price	3:38
16.	"L.E.S. Girl"	Madonna; Watt; Walter; Price	Madonna; Watt; Cirkut; Price	2:50
Total length:				63:52

Icon edition
No.	Title	Writer(s)	Length
17.	"Hot Sauce"	Madonna; Masis; Price; Benny Andersson; Björn Ulvaeus	3:07
Total length:			66:59

Grindr edition disc two
No.	Title	Writer(s)	Length
1.	"I Feel So Free" (live at Times Square)	Madonna; Price; Burns	3:04
2.	"Bring Your Love" (live at Times Square)	Madonna; Price; Holman; Jackson; Saunderson	3:45
3.	"Love Sensation" (live at Times Square)	Madonna; Price	2:50
4.	"Get Together" (live at Times Square)	Madonna; Anders Bagge; Peer Åström; Price	3:06
5.	"Sonata Faccile" (live at Times Square)	Wolfgang Amadeus Mozart	0:35
6.	"I Love New York" (live at Times Square)	Madonna; Price	2:26
7.	"Hung Up" (live at Times Square)	Madonna; Price; Andersson; Ulvaeus	3:25
Total length:			19:11

Afterhours edition disc two
No.	Title	Writer(s)	Producer(s)	Length
1.	"I Feel So Free" (Peggy Gou Energy mix)	Madonna; Price; Burns	Madonna; Price	4:27
2.	"Bring Your Love" (Stuart Price Afterhours mix)	Madonna; Price; Holman; Jackson; Saunderson	Madonna	5:34
3.	"Bring Your Love" (Twilight mix; with Carpenter)	Madonna; Price; Holman; Jackson; Saunderson	Madonna; Price	7:13
4.	"Bring Your Love" (Peaktime Dub remix; with Carpenter)	Madonna; Price; Holman; Jackson; Saunderson	Madonna; Price	4:29
5.	"Love Sensation" (Salute's Infinite Passion remix)	Madonna; Price	Madonna; Price	5:57
6.	"Love Sensation" (Floorplan mix)	Madonna; Price	Madonna; Price	5:27
Total length:				33:07

=== Notes ===
- Tracks are mixed into one another, similar to Confessions on a Dance Floor.
- "Love Sensation", "Betrayal", "The Test", and "L.E.S. Girl" are omitted on standard physical releases.
- An exclusive vinyl edition on Madonna's official store includes a bonus 7" vinyl featuring the original version and the Afterhours Edit of "Bring Your Love".
- Apple Music includes a teaser video as track 17.
- The Film edition includes the Confessions II film as track 17.
- Instrumentals edition includes the standard tracklist and, subsequently, instrumental versions of all 16 songs.

=== Sample credits ===
- "I Feel So Free" contains elements from "French Kiss" (1989), written and performed by Lil Louis.
- "Bring Your Love" contains an interpolation of "Good Life" (1988), written by Roy Holman, Shanna Jackson and Kevin Saunderson.
- "Danceteria" contains an interpolation of "Walk on the Wild Side" (1973), written by Lou Reed.
- "My Sins Are My Savior" contains elements from "My Army of Lovers" (1991), written by Ola Håkansson, Timothy Norell, Anders Hansson, Alexander Bard and Per Thyrén, and performed by Army of Lovers.
- "Betrayal" contains an interpolation of Gnossienne No. 1, written by Erik Satie.

== Credits and personnel ==
The credits are adapted from Madonna's official website and Tidal.

=== Locations ===
- Recorded at:
  - Bentley House Studios, New York City (tracks 1, 6)
  - Start Here, London (tracks 1, 2, 4–16)
  - Republic Studios, New York City (tracks 3, 4, 7, 10, 12, 15)
  - Electric Lady Studios, New York City (track 4)
  - Taylor Studio, London (track 11)
  - The Park House Studio (track 11)
- Mixed at Start Here, London
- Mastered at Sterling Sound, Los Angeles
- Vinyl master cut at Abbey Road Studios, London

=== Musicians ===
- Madonna – vocals (all tracks), background vocals (track 1), executive production
- Stuart Price – programming (tracks 1–4, 7, 9, 15), keyboards (tracks 1–4, 6–15), bass (tracks 1, 3, 4, 6–11, 13–15), drums (tracks 1, 4, 7, 9), strings (track 1), guitar (tracks 2, 6, 7, 12, 15), strings arrangement (tracks 3, 6, 12–14), additional programming (tracks 5, 16), additional keyboards (track 5), drum programming (tracks 6, 8, 10–14), backing vocals (track 8); executive producer; engineering, mixing (tracks 1–15); vocal engineering (tracks 2, 10)
- Arca – programming, keyboards (tracks 1, 15)
- Lil Louis – additional vocals (track 1)
- Marco Parisi – bass (tracks 4, 7, 9), keyboards (tracks 4, 9, 14), synthesizer (track 7), trumpet (track 14)
- Giampaolo Parisi – drums, programming (tracks 4, 7, 9); additional programming (track 14), sound effects (track 14)
- Sabrina Carpenter – vocals (track 4)
- Andrew Watt – guitar, keyboards (tracks 5, 16); bass (track 5), drums (track 16)
- Cirkut – keyboards, programming (track 5); drum programming, drums, mixing (track 16)
- Tainy – bass, drum programming (track 6)
- Feid – vocals (track 6)
- Martin Garrix – drum programming, keyboards (track 10)
- Mustapha LeBeau – keyboards (track 11)
- Estere – vocals (track 12)
- Stella – vocals (track 12)
- Stromae – vocals (track 13)
- Mirwais – drum programming, keyboards (track 14)
- Kamilla Arku – piano (track 14)
- Lola Leon – vocals (track 15)

=== Technical ===
- Laura Sisk – engineering (track 4)
- Lanita Smith – engineering (track 11)
- Robot Scott Carter – engineering (track 11)
- Lauren D'Elia – vocal engineering (track 10)
- Henry Elkind – engineering assistance (tracks 1, 6)
- Jeremy Brown – engineering assistance (tracks 1, 6)
- Luke Volkert – second engineering assistance (tracks 1, 6)
- Theo Rogers – second engineering assistance (tracks 1, 6)
- Varun Jhunjhunwalla – second engineering assistance (tracks 1, 6)
- Gloria Colston – engineering assistance (tracks 3, 4, 7, 12, 15)
- Jack Manning – engineering assistance (track 4)
- Jagger Price – mixing assistance (tracks 1–3)
- Pepe – stem mixing (track 10)
- Ruairi O'Flaherty – mastering
- Miles Showell – vinyl master cut
- Danny Zook – sample clearances
- Ron Cabiltes – sample clearances

== Charts ==
=== Weekly charts ===
Weekly chart performance
Chart (2026)	Peak position
Australian Albums (ARIA)	1
Austrian Albums (Ö3 Austria)	1
Belgian Albums (Ultratop Flanders)	1
Belgian Albums (Ultratop Wallonia)	1
Canadian Albums (Billboard)	1
Croatian International Albums (HDU)	1
Czech Albums (ČNS IFPI)	10
Danish Albums (Hitlisten)	5
Dutch Albums (Album Top 100)	1
Finnish Albums (Suomen virallinen lista)	1
French Albums (SNEP)	1
German Albums (Offizielle Top 100)	2
German Pop Albums (Offizielle Top 100)	1
Greek Albums (IFPI)	1
Hungarian Albums (MAHASZ)	1
Irish Albums (Official Charts)	2
Italian Albums (FIMI)	1
Japanese Albums (Oricon)	12
Japanese Combined Albums (Oricon)	13
Japanese Hot Albums (Billboard Japan)	80
Lithuanian Albums (AGATA)	31
New Zealand Albums (RMNZ)	2
Norwegian Albums (IFPI Norge)	8
Polish Albums (ZPAV)	2
Portuguese Albums (AFP)	1
Scottish Albums (Official Charts)	1
Slovak Albums (ČNS IFPI)	7
Spanish Albums (PROMUSICAE)	1
Swedish Albums (Sverigetopplistan)	2
Swiss Albums (Schweizer Hitparade)	1
UK Albums (Official Charts)	1
UK Dance Albums (Official Charts)	1
US Billboard 200	1
US Top Dance Albums (Billboard)	1

=== Monthly charts ===
Monthly chart performance
Chart (2026)	Position
Croatian International Vinyl Albums (HDU)	1
German Vinyl Albums (Offizielle Top 100)	3
Japanese Western Albums (Oricon)	17

== Certifications ==
Certifications for Confessions II
Region	Certification	Certified units/sales
Canada (Music Canada)	Gold	40,000^{‡}
Italy (FIMI)	Gold	25,000^{‡}
Spain (Promusicae)	Gold	20,000^{‡}
United Kingdom (BPI)	Silver	60,000^{‡}
^{‡} Sales+streaming figures based on certification alone.

== Release history ==
Release history
Region	Date	Edition(s)	Format(s)	Ref.
Worldwide	July 3, 2026	Standard; deluxe	Cassette; CD; music download; streaming; LP (Note: Including exclusive editions for Target, Amazon, Barnes & Noble, independent stores and TikTok.); picture disc (Note: Including exclusive edition for Grindr.)	(Note: Attributed to multiple sources:)
Worldwide	July 3, 2026	Icon Edition	Music download; streaming	
Worldwide	July 3, 2026	The Film Edition	Music download; streaming	
Worldwide	July 5, 2026	Instrumentals	Music download; streaming	
Worldwide	July 7, 2026	Grindr Edition	Music download; streaming	
Worldwide	July 10, 2026	Afterhours Edition	Music download; streaming	
Japan	July 29, 2026	Standard; deluxe	CD	

== See also ==
- List of Billboard 200 number-one albums of 2026
- List of Top Album Sales number ones of the 2020s
- List of Billboard 200 number-one albums of the 2020s
- List of Billboard number-one dance albums of 2026
- List of number-one albums of 2026 (Australia)
- List of number-one hits of 2026 (Austria)
- List of number-one albums of 2026 (Belgium)
- List of number-one albums of 2026 (Canada)
- List of number-one albums of 2026 (Finland)
- List of number-one hits of 2026 (France)
- List of number-one hits of 2026 (Italy)
- List of number-one albums of 2026 (Portugal)
- List of number-one albums of 2026 (Scotland)
- List of number-one albums of 2026 (Spain)
- List of number-one hits of 2026 (Switzerland)
- List of UK Albums Chart number ones of the 2020s
- List of UK Album Downloads Chart number ones of the 2020s
- List of UK Dance Albums Chart number ones of 2026
- List of UK top-ten albums in 2026
