= Everything (Madonna song) =

Song by Madonna

from the album Confessions II
- Released: July 3, 2026
- Studio: Start Here (London); Republic Studios (New York City)
- Genre: Techno; house; EDM
- Length: 4:09
- Label: Warner
- Songwriters: Madonna; Stuart Price
- Producers: Madonna; Stuart Price; Parisi

"Everything" is a song by American singer-songwriter Madonna from her fifteenth studio album, Confessions II (2026). She wrote and produced it alongside British producer Stuart Price, with Italian duo Parisi credited as additional producers, and the song became available as the album's seventh track on July 3, 2026, by Warner Records. The techno and house song has lyrics about the sadness of the world and trying to avoid it via clubland escapism. "Everything" received positive reviews from music critics.

== Background and release ==
In 2005, Madonna released her tenth studio album Confessions on a Dance Floor, produced by Stuart Price, to critical and commercial success. In September 2024, Madonna announced on her Instagram account that she was working on new music with Price. The following February, she confirmed that her new music was a follow-up to Confessions on a Dance Floor and teased its release in 2025. She continued to document the recording sessions on social media, posting pictures in the studio with Price throughout 2025. In September 2025, she announced a reunion with her original record label of over 25 years, Warner Records, with the album slated for release in 2026. Madonna officially announced Confessions II on April 15, 2026, and its tracklist on May 14, revealing "Everything" as the seventh song on the tracklist. Warner Records released the song along with the rest of the album for digital download and streaming on July 3.

== Composition ==
"Everything" was written and produced by Madonna and Stuart Price, with additional production by Italian duo Parisi. The track was recorded and engineered by Price at Republic Studios in New York City and Start Here in London, with additional keyboards, bass, guitars, drums, and programming provided by Price alongside Marco and Giampaolo Parisi. Musically, "Everything" is a dark techno and stuttering house anthem featuring a heavy, thumping bassline and EDM elements. Described by Kitty Empire, from The Observer, as containing "one of the hardest-slapping beats on the record," the track builds with a sense of poignant urgency, creating an atmospheric, club-ready soundscape. Critics noted sonic nods to her classic 1990s singles, such as "Justify My Love" (1990) and "Bedtime Story" (1994), as well as the elevated EDM style of her 2012 album MDNA. The song features continuously ascending chord harmonies resembling a Shepard tone.

Lyrically, "Everything" functions as a socio-cultural screed and an urgent plea for dancefloor escapism. Madonna addresses modern isolation, doomscrolling, and the decline of nightlife culture, expressing frustration at people staying indoors ("No one wants to go outside / It's not okay, it blows my mind / It's not okay, I don't fuck with it"). Alongside its critique of societal withdrawal and negativity ("Why you always make me feel so bad about myself?"), the song explores themes of spiritual transcendence and catharsis, offering a message of hope amidst dark times ("So come outside into the light", "Wherever there's the greatest amount of darkness / That's where you'll find the greatest light").

== Critical reception ==
Katie Bain, for Billboard, named "Everything" the second best song on Confessions II, stating that it has "a genuinely emotional high point that makes good on all of the album’s other promises of dance floor salvation".

== Credits and personnel ==
The credits are adapted from Madonna's official website.

- Madonna – vocals, songwriting, producer
- Stuart Price – songwriting, producer, keyboards, bass, drums, programming, guitars, engineering, mixing
- Marco Parisi – bass, synthesizers, additional producer
- Giampaolo Parisi – drums, programming, additional producer
- Gloria Colston – assistant engineering
- Ruairi O'Flaherty – mastering
- Miles Showell – vinyl master cut

Recorded at Republic Studios (New York City) and Start Here (London). Mixed at Start Here (London). Mastered at Sterling Sound (Los Angeles). Vinyl master cut at Abbey Road Studios (London).
