= Bizarre (song) =

2026 song by Madonna and Martin Garrix

Song by Madonna and Martin Garrix

from the album Confessions II
- Released: July 3, 2026
- Studio: Start Here (London); Republic Studios (New York City)
- Genre: EDM; trance; house
- Length: 4:05
- Label: Warner
- Songwriters: Madonna; Martijn Garritsen; Oskar Rindborg; Wilhelm Börjesson; Taylor Upsahl; Stuart Price
- Producers: Madonna; Martin Garrix; Osrin; Price

"Bizarre" is a song by American singer Madonna and Dutch DJ and record producer Martin Garrix from the former's fifteenth studio album, Confessions II (2026). An EDM song about the bizarrity of love, it was written and produced by Madonna, Garrix, Osrin and Stuart Price, with additional songwriting by Wilhelm Börjesson and Upsahl.

The song debuted at number 10 on the New Zealand Hot Singles Chart and at number 58 on the UK Singles Downloads Chart.

== Background, release and promotion ==
Madonna announced her fifteenth studio album, Confessions II, on April 15, 2026. Produced by Stuart Price, the album serves as a sequel to Confessions on a Dance Floor (2005). On May 14, 2026, the track list for the album had appeared on posters in major global cities, containing 12 tracks, including "Danceteria". The song was recorded with Martin Garrix in New York City.

On June 13, 2026, Garrix played the song for the first time at his show at Barclays Center in Brooklyn. At the afterparty he confirmed it was a collaboration with Madonna. He has included the song in an alternative remix during his subsequent shows. On July 3, 2026, the day of the song's release, he played it as a surprise guest on the release party of Confessions II during the Open'er Festival in Gdynia, Poland.

== Composition ==
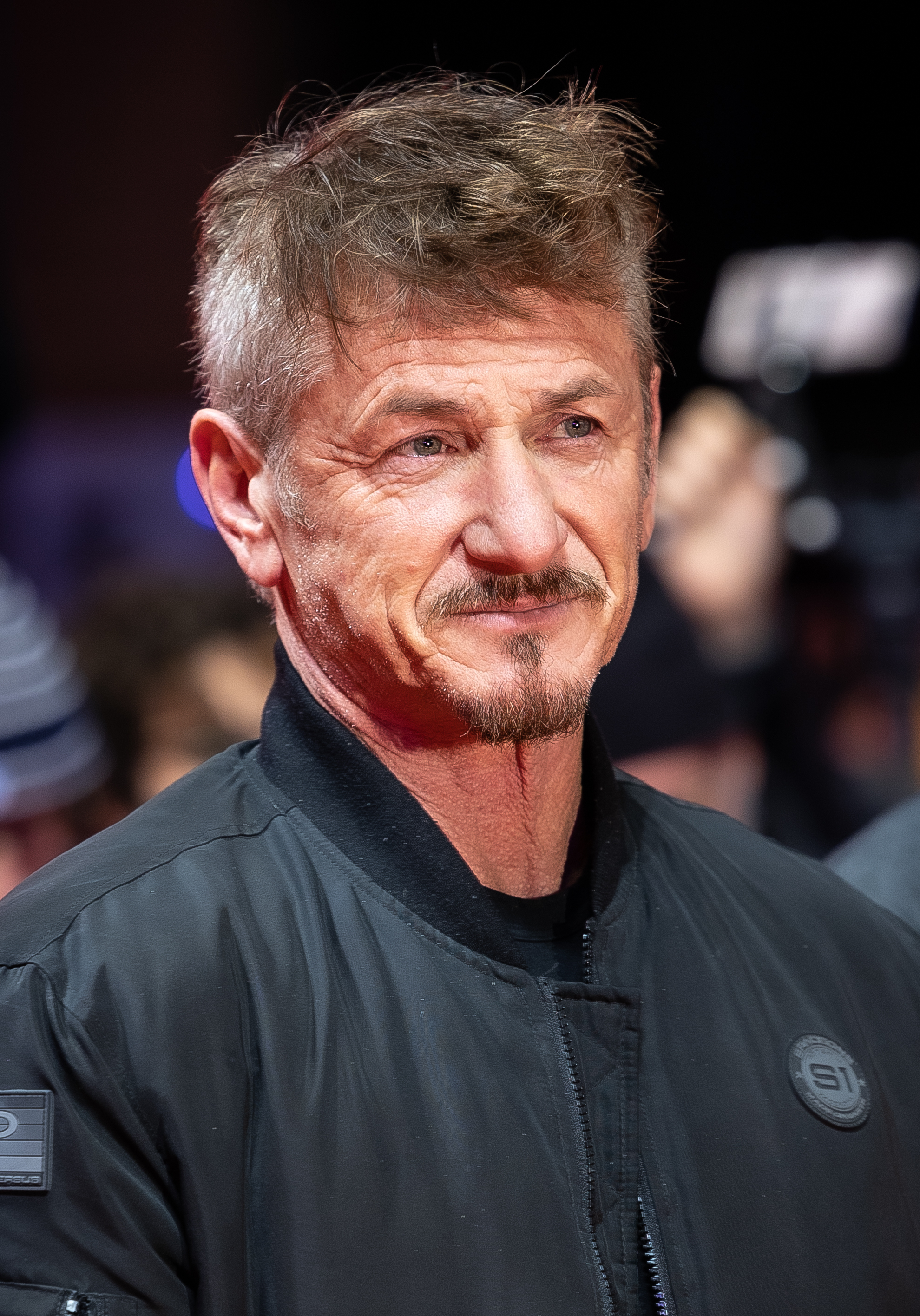
The song has been interpreted as addressed to Madonna's ex-husband, Sean Penn (pictured).

"Bizarre" is an EDM, trance and house song with string synthesizers. Steven J. Horowitz of Variety called it a "big tent anthem". Classic Pop's John Earls deemed it "the most route-one euphoric track for dayravers". Neil Z. Yeung of AllMusic felt that the song was "slowly building" and exploded with "some angelic vocal highs". Soundwaves's Jason Landry described it as a "experimental electronic piece that relies on harmonious vocals and a driving industrial beat". Consequence's Paolo Ragusa compared it to "if Eurythmics' 'Sweet Dreams (Are Made of This)' opened up and swallowed a turbo pop rager". Eric Henderson of Slant Magazine described the string synthesizers as "baroque" and compared them to the work of Eurythmics. People's Jeff Nelson compared the song's "cinematic and driving beat" to Madonna's 2012 song "Gang Bang". Sam Rosenberg of Paste felt that the song was "conjuring" the EDM style of her 2012 album MDNA. Mark Savage from BBC News called it "all brightness and light".

The song starts with a spoken word intro: "Love is the strangest thing. Just when you think you finally let go, it comes back to you." Its lyrics refer to a love relationship with an ex man from Hollywood, described as "movie star with deep blue eyes", who wouldn't share the red carpet moments with her and drove Shelby Cobra. Madonna reflects with surprise on a bizarrity of still caring and feeling temptation and pain over their broken relationship. Several media outlets interpreted the song to be about Madonna's ex-husband, actor Sean Penn, pointing out that Shelby Cobra was her wedding present for him.

== Critical reception ==
Savage listed "Bizarre" among the album's standout tracks. Yeung called it "one of the album's most satisfying entries". The Independent's Roisin O'Connor felt that Madonna's collaboration with Garrix was an "intriguing prospect", resulting in a "quick dopamine hit". Rosenberg opined that the song was elevating the EDM style "to a surprisingly refreshing degree". Landry opined: "The build up to the chorus is epic and shows how a seasoned icon can still take massive artistic risks and make them feel so effortless and expansive all at the same time." Alex F. of EDMTunes felt that "the satisfying beat and catchy chorus ensure the song works in both club and everyday listening settings".

Katie Bain of Billboard listed it as the album's worst track. She felt that while it was "well produced and certainly enticing in terms of subject matter, it's cluttered with sonic ideas that almost get there but never fully gel".

== Credits and personnel ==
The credits are adapted from Madonna's official website and Tidal.

- Madonna – vocals, songwriting, production
- Martin Garrix – songwriting, production, drum programming, keyboards
- Stuart Price – songwriting, production, keyboards, bass, drum programming, engineering, mixing, vocal engineering
- Oskar Rindborg (Osrin) – songwriting, production
- Wilhelm Börjesson – songwriting
- Taylor Upsahl – songwriting
- Lauren D'Elia – vocal engineering
- Pepe – stem mixing
- Ruairi O'Flaherty – mastering
- Miles Showell – vinyl master cut

Recorded at Start Here (London) and Republic Studios (New York City). Mixed at Start Here (London). Mastered at Sterling Sound (Los Angeles). Vinyl master cut at Abbey Road Studios (London).

== Charts ==
=== Weekly charts ===
Weekly chart performance
Chart (2026)	Peak position
Belarus Airplay (TopHit)	2
CIS Airplay (TopHit)	10
Estonia Airplay (TopHit)	34
Kazakhstan Airplay (TopHit)	34
Latvia Airplay (TopHit)	23
Moldova Airplay (TopHit)	7
New Zealand Hot Singles (RMNZ)	10
Russia Airplay (TopHit)	4
Ukraine Airplay (TopHit)	199
UK Singles Sales (OCC)	65
UK Singles Downloads (OCC)	58

=== Monthly charts ===
Monthly chart performance
Chart (2026)	Peak position
Belarus Airplay (TopHit)	4
CIS Airplay (TopHit)	11
Estonia Airplay (TopHit)	42
Kazakhstan Airplay (TopHit)	36
Latvia Airplay (TopHit)	26
Moldova Airplay (TopHit)	10
Russia Airplay (TopHit)	3
