= Lil Louis =

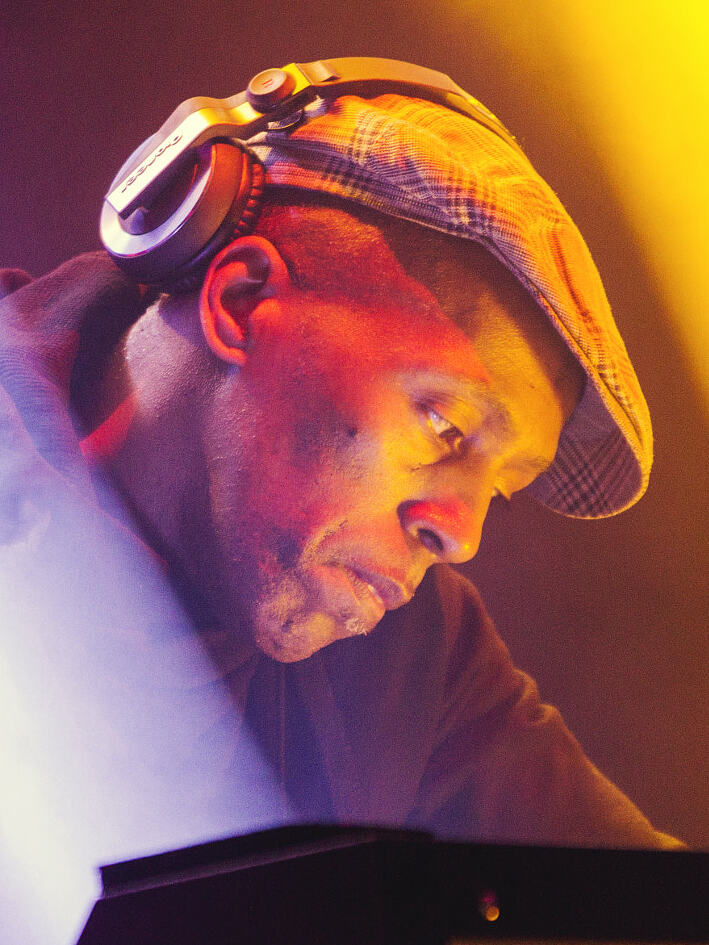
- Lil Louis in 2015

Background information
- Born: Marvin Louis Burns; May 13, 1962 (age 64); Chicago, Illinois, U.S.
- Genres: House
- Occupations: DJ; record producer; singer; songwriter; musician
- Labels: FFRR/PolyGram; Epic/SME Records; Diamond Records

Marvin Louis Burns (born May 13, 1962), known by his stage name Li'l Louis (sometimes expanded to Li'l Louis & the World and Li'l Louis & the Party), is a Chicago-born house-music producer and DJ . He scored a number of hits on the Billboard Hot Dance Music/Club Play chart in the 1980s and 1990s, three of which hit number one.

His best-known song, "French Kiss", spent two weeks at No. 1 on the U.S. Hot Dance Music/Club Play chart in 1989. Originally an instrumental, the track features a several-minute breakdown in which the tempo gradually slows to a stop. As the song gained popularity, vocals by Shawn Christopher were added. Even with its erotic sound, it crossed over to some pop radio stations and climbed to No. 50 on the Billboard Hot 100. It was a big success throughout Europe, reaching No. 2 in the UK Singles Chart, despite being banned by the BBC, and in Germany, and No. 1 in the Netherlands. The video was directed by Marek Budzynski. British drum-and-bass producers Ed Rush and Optical later produced a remix.

In the track "Teachers" from the 1997 Homework album by Daft Punk, Lil Louis is one of the many musicians mentioned.

Laurent Garnier's 1997 single "Flashback" contained a remix by Lil Louis called "Lil Louis Civilized Instrumental Painting."

In 2000, fellow producer Josh Wink released "How's Your Evening So Far?"—credited to Wink Featuring Lil Louis—a track that heavily sampled "French Kiss". The song peaked at No. 3 on the dance chart. The song was also sampled in 2000 by hip hop emcee Lil' Kim on the track "Custom Made (Give It To You)," which was featured on The Notorious KIM.

In 2009, Louis was featured in the track "One More Chance" by British electronic music duo Basement Jaxx from their fifth studio album Scars.

In 2013, John Legend released the song "Made to Love", which features a prominent sample of the Lil' Louis song "Video Clash", on Kanye West's G.O.O.D. Music label.

On January 24, 2015, Louis suffered permanent sound-induced hearing loss in his left ear during a soundcheck in Manchester, England, when an air horn was let off near him.

On April 17, 2026, American singer-songwriter Madonna premiered "I Feel So Free" on iHeartRadio's Pride station, and released the first promotional single from her upcoming fifteenth studio album, Confessions II (2026) two days later. The song, written and produced by Madonna and Stuart Price, with co-production by Arca, heavily samples "French Kiss" by Louis, and it was later described as an homage to the producer and DJ.

== Discography ==
=== Albums ===
- From the Mind of Lil Louis (FFRR/PolyGram UK; Epic/SME Records US, 1989)
- Li'l Louis & the World – Journey with the Lonely (Epic/SME Records US, 1992)

=== Singles ===
Year	Single	Peak positions												Album
Year	Single	US	US Dance	AUS	NED	BEL (FL)	FRA	GER	AUT	SWI	SWE	IRE	UK	Album
1987	"Frequency / How I Feel"	—	—	—	—	—	—	—	—	—	—	—	—	singles only
1988	"The Original Video Clash / Music Takes U Away"	—	—	—	—	—	—	—	—	—	—	—	—	singles only
1988	"7 Days of Peace / War Games" (as Lil' Louis and the Diamond Corp.)	—	—	—	—	—	—	—	—	—	—	—	—	singles only
1989	"French Kiss"	50	1	35	1	3	5	2	4	2	16	6	2	French Kisses – The Complete Mix Collection EP
1990	"I Called U (But You Weren't There)"	—	—	—	66	48	—	—	—	—	—	23	16	From The Mind of Lil' Louis (as Lil' Louis & The World)
1990	"Nyce & Slo"	—	—	—	—	—	—	—	—	—	—	—	89	From The Mind of Lil' Louis (as Lil' Louis & The World)
1992	"Club Lonely" (featuring Joi Cardwell)	—	1	—	—	—	—	—	—	—	—	—	—	Journey with the Lonely (as Lil' Louis & The World)
1992	"Saved My Life" (featuring Joi Cardwell)	—	1	—	—	—	—	—	—	—	—	—	74	Journey with the Lonely (as Lil' Louis & The World)
1997	"Clap Your Hands" (as Lil' Louis & The Party)	—	—	—	—	—	—	—	—	—	—	—	77	Singles only
2000	"How's Your Evening So Far?" (with Josh Wink)	—	—	—	—	—	—	—	—	—	—	—	23	Singles only
2001	"Blackout" (Li'l Louis vs. Hydrogen Rockers)	—	—	—	—	—	—	—	—	—	—	—	—	Singles only
"—" denotes releases that did not chart or were not released.

== See also ==
- List of number-one dance hits (United States)
- List of artists who reached number one on the US Dance chart
