= Confessions II (film) =

2026 short film

- Directed by: TORSO
- Produced by: Sara Zambreno; Mathilde Hamart
- Starring: Madonna
- Cinematography: Daniel Landin
- Edited by: Will Town; Lauren Fiedman; Danny Tull
- Music by: Madonna; Stuart Price
- Production company: Division
- Distributed by: Warner Records
- Release dates: June 5, 2026 (Tribeca Festival); June 8, 2026 (YouTube)
- Running time: 14 minutes
- Country: United States
- Language: English

Confessions II (also known as Confessions II – The Film) is a 2026 musical short film and visual album directed by TORSO. It stars American singer Madonna and serves as the visual companion to her fifteenth studio album Confessions II (2026), built around the first six songs. It premiered on June 5, 2026, on the Tribeca Festival and was released three days later on YouTube. It won four awards at the 2026 MTV Video Music Awards, including Best Long Form Video, along with a nomination for Video of the Year.

== Synopsis ==
The film opens with the spoken-word introduction from "I Feel So Free", showing Madonna seated in a revolving chair as a film crew dressed as a SWAT team breaks into the room and surrounds her with cameras. The sequence transitions into "Good for the Soul", where Madonna appears in a forest among dancers performing ritualistic choreography with green laser effects. In "One Step Away", Madonna is shown behind a rain-covered window while the scene alternates with footage of her driving recklessly on a highway. The segment ends with her crashing into a barrier and leaving a red lipstick mark on the airbag. "Bring Your Love" follows Madonna into a fog-filled nightclub, where the SWAT crew loses sight of her in the crowd, while she sings with Sabrina Carpenter. The "Danceteria" segment takes place in the nightclub bathroom. In "Read My Lips", Madonna discovers Feid behind a vanity mirror, leading into a performance surrounded by screens showing Madonna against a pink backdrop. The film then returns to the opening setup for the final "I Feel So Free" sequence, revealing that members of the SWAT crew have been reviewing the footage. One masked crew member is revealed to be Madonna's daughter, Lourdes Leon, who walks through the apartment as the crew is shown off duty. After Leon says "Cut, bitch", the credits roll.

== Cast ==
- Madonna
- Arca
- Archie Madekwe
- Benedict Cumberbatch
- Cole Palmer
- Daniele Sibilli
- Debi Mazar
- Feid
- Gwendoline Christie
- Honey Dijon
- João Pedro
- Julia Garner
- Kate Moss
- Odessa A'zion
- Richard E. Grant
- Sabrina Carpenter
- Shygirl
- Lourdes Leon

== Production ==
The film was directed by TORSO (David Toro and Solomon Chase) and shot over six months in London, Los Angeles and New York City, while Madonna was working on her 2026 studio album Confessions II. It was built around the first six songs of the album. Madonna revealed that she preferred creating a visual album rather than music videos, because she found the idea of a film more impressive than a video, which she deemed "cheap". She thought of TORSO as the directors for the project and described them her idea of "transporting people" through the film. The film featured costumes from both archival and recent collections of Dolce & Gabbana, including Madonna's rhinestone-embellished top from the fall 1991 collection and a body-skimming dress inspired by a silhouette from the spring 1998 collection. The main choreographer was Damien Jalet, who previously collaborated with Madonna for the Madame X Tour.

16 celebrities appeared in the film, including Sabrina Carpenter and Feid, featured performers on "Bring Your Love" and "Read My Lips". It also includes cameo appearance by Julia Garner, who was tapped to play Madonna in her unrealized biographical film, as her younger version, as well as Madonna's daughter Lourdes Leon. The cameo appearance of Debi Mazar during "Danceteria" referenced the song being inspired by Madonna partying with her at the Danceteria nightclub in the 1980s, before either of them were famous.

== Release ==
On May 12, 2026, Madonna announced the film and its premiere. The film premiered on June 5, 2026, at the Beacon Theatre in New York City, during the Tribeca Festival; it was followed by a Q&A with Madonna and TORSO, moderated by Anderson Cooper, who filled for the initially announced moderator Jimmy Fallon. The tickets for the event were available for purchase exclusively to Madonna Community members. The film was released on YouTube on June 8, 2026. On June 15, 2026, the extended version of "Bring Your Love" from the film was released as the song's standalone music video. On June 24, 2026, the film had a special screening at the Max Linder Panorama in Paris, followed by a Q&A with Madonna. It was also included on the alternative digital version of Confessions II album, subtitled The Film Edition. On July 6, 2026, Madonna released a behind the scenes short film of the making of the video.

== Response ==
The video was watched 1.2 million times in its first 24 hours on YouTube. Zoe Williams of The Guardian suggested that it would be remembered as the "vagina laser video".

Joey Nolfi of Entertainment Weekly called the film Madonna's "boldest (and best) work in years", as well as "a powerful meditation on her legacy, her future, and how the world sees her as she reaches a new dawn in a storied life that's largely played out in arenas beyond her control." Consequence's Travis Bland felt that it "leads us through a feverish vision, defying the passage of time, and proving she still knows what it takes to stand out and be true to herself as well as the magnetism that made her a star." Sal Cinquemani of Slant Magazine called it "phantasmagoric disco dream", feeling it was "little more than a highlight reel for the album, which is exactly what music videos were originally conceived to be." Clash's Robin Murray deemed it a "glitzy, all-star affair". Kory Grow of Rolling Stone felt it was "something unique, neither a clip nor a short film, but a let's-get-unconscious freaky bedtime story", where "everything blended together into a fever dream".

== Accolades ==
At the 2026 MTV Video Music Awards, the film was the most-nominated video of the night, receiving nine nominations, including Video of the Year. It won four awards: Best Dance, Best Long Form Video, Best Cinematography, and Best Choreography. It was also nominated for Music Video of the Year in the 2026 Grindr Unwrapped year in review.

Awards and nominations
Award	Date	Category	Recipient(s)	Result	Ref.
MTV Video Music Awards	September 27, 2026	Video of the Year	Madonna	Nominated	
MTV Video Music Awards	September 27, 2026	Best Dance	Madonna	Won	
MTV Video Music Awards	September 27, 2026	Best Long Form Video	Madonna	Won	
MTV Video Music Awards	September 27, 2026	Best Direction	TORSO	Nominated	
MTV Video Music Awards	September 27, 2026	Best Art Direction	TORSO and Arthur de Borman	Nominated	
MTV Video Music Awards	September 27, 2026	Best Cinematography	Daniel Landin	Won	
MTV Video Music Awards	September 27, 2026	Best Editing	Will Town, Lauren Friedman and Danny Tull	Nominated	
MTV Video Music Awards	September 27, 2026	Best Choreography	Damien Jalet, Megan Lawson, Young Boy Dancing Group and Nicolas Huchard	Won	
MTV Video Music Awards	September 27, 2026	Best Visual Effects	Monumental	Nominated	
UK Music Video Awards	November 4, 2026	Best Pop Video – International	TORSO	Nominated	
UK Music Video Awards	November 4, 2026	Best Special Visual Project	TORSO	Nominated	
UK Music Video Awards	November 4, 2026	Best Cinematography in a Video	Daniel Landin	Nominated	
Camerimage International Cinematography Festival	November 14, 2026	Best Music Video	TORSO and Daniel Landin	Nominated	
