= 2015 in British radio =

This is a list of events in British radio during 2015.

== Events ==
=== January ===
- 1 January – BBC Radio 4 airs a 10-hour adaptation of Tolstoy's War and Peace written by Timberlake Wertenbaker.
- 5 January –
  - Magic launches nationally on Digital One, while all Magic Network AM stations in the north of England are rebranded as Bauer City 2.
  - Absolute Radio changes from broadcasting in stereo to mono to make way for Magic on DAB.
- 7 January – Ken Bruce celebrates 30 years as a presenter with BBC Radio 2.
- 9 January – UTV Media confirms that it is considering the sale of some of its UK radio stations.
- 12 January – Simon Bates begins presenting the breakfast show for BBC Radio Devon. The programme is quickly criticised on social media for its lack of direction, while Deborah Vinton of the Plymouth Herald describes BBC Radio Devon's decision to employ Bates as a "huge and costly mistake".
- 19 January –
  - The Hits is split into a network of fresh-hits DAB stations in Bauer's heritage areas – Bauer City 3 – with split localised news, branding and advertising, and shared programme content. This programming also remains available nationally on Freeview under The Hits Radio name. The Hits is removed from DAB in London and Birmingham, the Birmingham space going to Kisstory (then to KissFresh after Kisstory's move to Sound Digital in 2016).
  - Ofcom finds Kiss FM to have breached its regulations after it played an explicit version of Calvin Harris's "Open Wide" on an edition of its Kiss Official Top 40 in November 2014.
- 25 January – Clara Amfo joins BBC Radio 1 and becomes the new presenter of The Official Chart.
- 28 January – It is announced that Georgey Spanswick will take over the Friday edition of the BBC Local Radio evening programme from April as Mark Forrest reduces his number of weekly shows from five to four.

=== February ===
- 2 February –
  - Ofcom reprimands BBC Radio 1 after presenter Nick Grimshaw played a live recording of the Foo Fighters song "Something from Nothing" which contained two expletives during an edition of his breakfast show in November 2014.
  - The Radio Today website reports that Burslem based community station 6 Towns Radio was banned from reporting on Port Vale matches by the club's chairman following the way the station is alleged to have handled a charity day at the beginning of the 2014–15 season.
- 3 February – Ofcom announces that two bids have been received for the second national digital multiplex.
- 10 February – Radio Today reports that the RNIB have removed Insight Radio from Sky and Freesat in order to concentrate on its Freeview service. Absolute Radio 70s has replaced Insight Radio on Sky Channel 0188.
- 10 February – Making his debut on Radio 4's Just a Minute, actor David Tennant becomes the quiz show's most successful debut contestant after speaking about William Shakespeare's stage direction "Exit, Pursued by a Bear", for 60 seconds without once being interrupted.
- 15 February – It is announced that Zane Lowe will leave Radio 1 in March after twelve years with the network. Annie Mac will take over his weekday evening new music programme. Lowe's last show will be on 5 March.
- 18 February – Radio 1 denies banning Madonna's latest single "Living for Love" from the airwaves because of her age following complaints from listeners because the song was not added to the station's playlist.
- 19 February – BBC Radio Ulster announces a shake up of its schedule, which includes extending Cherrie McIlwaine's music show to five nights a week.
- 22 February – Victory, the first of two forgotten screenplays written by Harold Pinter that have been recorded for radio, is aired by Radio 4. The second play, The Dreaming Child, airs on 28 February.
- 24 February – A glitch at Heart Scotland allows listeners to hear a private conversation between breakfast presenters Robin Galloway and Adele Cunningham after their microphones remain live following the end of the show. The conversation includes expletives and a discussion about circumcision. The pair later apologise over the incident.
- 26 February – The Radio 1 Chart Show may be moved from Sunday to a different day of the week after the International Federation of the Phonographic Industry announced moves for Friday to become a worldwide day for the release of new music. Presently singles are released in the UK on Sundays and albums the following day.
- 27 February – Fearne Cotton announces she is to leave Radio 1 to start "a new chapter".

=== March ===
- 3 March – Several BBC local radio stations are launched on Freeview, with ten of the 40 local stations in England now broadcasting on the platform. They can be found on channels 719 to 722.
- 4 March –
  - Jazz FM celebrates its 25th anniversary with a series of clips from its archives.
  - Radio 1 DJ Nihal criticises the station's diversity, and claims that "nothing has changed" at the BBC since its former Director-General Greg Dyke described it as "hideously white" in 2001.
- 12 March – Madonna criticises Radio 1's decision not to play her latest single as "discriminatory and unfair".
- 19 March – As part of BBC cost-cutting plans Radio 1 is to reduce the number of live music events it covers.
- 23 March – Police charge DJ Neil Fox with nine counts of sexual assault against six individuals, including three children.
- 24 March – Radio 1 announces that The Official Chart will move from Sundays to Friday afternoons from mid-July in response to changes in the day new music is released. There will also be a live television programme on the CBBC Channel.
- 27 March –
  - BBC Radio 2 newsreader and continuity announcer Alan Dedicoat presents his final bulletins for the network after 28 years. But although he is retiring from radio, Dedicoat will continue his work on television.
  - The Sound Digital consortium, which includes UTV Media, wins the licence to launch the Digital Two network in 2016. UTV Media will launch four new stations on the platform.
- 31 March – Ofcom launches an investigation into Bauer Media and Absolute Radio for an alleged breach of its regulations, but no details of the incident are to be released until the investigation is complete.

=== April ===
- 2 April – Absolute 80s announces that it will begin airing classic charts from the 1980s in the 4.00–7.00pm Sunday slot vacated by Radio 1. The show, hosted by Martyn Lee, will begin in May.
- 5 April – BBC Radio 3 Controller Alan Davey announces plans to revive Pied Piper, the 1970s series that introduced young listeners to classical music.
- 15 April – Schedule changes at Radio 1 and BBC 1Xtra are announced for early June. They will see Adele Roberts presenting the Early Breakfast Show currently hosted by Gemma Cairney. Cairney will become the station's social action presenter, hosting The Surgery and documentaries for both networks.
- 28 April – Sandi Toksvig announces she is to step down as presenter of Radio 4's The News Quiz after nine years. She subsequently announces that she decided to leave the programme in order to establish a new political party named the Women's Equality Party.
- 29 April – BBC television sitcom Peter Kay's Car Share introduces the fictitious radio station Forever FM.

=== May ===
- 19 May – BBC Radio 2 presenter Chris Evans announces that Jeremy Clarkson will be a guest on the 21 May edition of his breakfast show, where the pair will discuss Clarkson's departure from Top Gear. The interview is Clarkson's first since leaving the programme. During his subsequent appearance on the show, Clarkson describes the reason for his sacking from Top Gear as being "my own silly fault".
- 20 May – Ofcom clears Global Radio over a decision to advise its radio stations to drop reports about the HSBC tax controversy on the day the story broke. Reporting of the story was resumed some days later. The regulatory body finds that no third party was involved in influencing Global's decision.
- 21 May – Figures released by RAJAR indicate that BBC Radio 4 Extra has overtaken BBC 6 Music as the most listened digital only radio station, with 2.17 million tuning in weekly to BBC Radio 4 Extra compared to 2.06 million for BBC 6 Music.
- 22 May – Fearne Cotton presents her final show for BBC Radio 1 after ten years with the network.
- 23–24 – Radio 1's Big Weekend takes place at Norwich's Earlham Park. Acts appearing on stage include Taylor Swift, Muse, Fall Out Boy and the Foo Fighters.

=== June ===
- 3 June – Radio 4 presenter James Naughtie apologises after facing an online backlash because he referred to transgender celebrity Caitlyn Jenner in the male gender during a discussion on the Today programme.
- 5 June – UTV Media agrees a £10 million deal to sell Liverpool's Juice FM to Global Radio.
- 8 June – Apple announce the launch of Apple Music, a service that will include Beats 1, a worldside radio station based in Britain and the United States, and headed by former Radio 1 presenter Zane Lowe.
- 11 June – It is confirmed that the Official Chart Show will move to Fridays from 10 July to coincide with the new weekly worldwide music release day. The programme, titled The Official Chart with Greg James, will air on Radio 1 at 4.00pm on Fridays.
- 28 June – Radio 4 will mark National Poetry Day on 8 October with a series of poems telling the story of Britain. We British: An Epic In Poetry will run throughout the day and see Andrew Marr, Dominic West and Fiona Shaw reading works by names such as Walter Raleigh, William Shakespeare, Geoffrey Chaucer and William Wordsworth.
- 29 June –
  - BBC Radio 4 announces the commissioning of Dead Girls Tell No Tales, a drama telling the behind-the-scenes story of a plotline from The Archers which saw the character Grace Archer killed in a fire in 1955.
  - Miles Jupp is revealed as the new presenter of Radio 4's The News Quiz, succeeding Sandi Toksvig.
- 30 June – Launch of Apple's global radio station Beats 1.

=== July ===
- 4 July – Stephanie Hirst returns to radio to present a 90s show for BBC Radio Manchester.
- 5 July – The final Sunday broadcast of Radio 1's Official UK Chart Show.
- 7 July –
  - James Naughtie announces he will leave the Today programme after 21 years to become a special correspondent at the end of the year.
  - Writing for the Radio Times, BBC Radio 3 presenter Suzy Klein describes the critics of a planned BBC Proms concert celebrating the sounds of Ibiza as "snobs and scaremongers".
- 9 July – Nick Robinson is to step down from the role of BBC News's political editor in order to succeed James Naughtie as presenter of BBC Radio 4's Today programme. He will also report on news and current affairs for radio and television.
- 10 July – The first Friday broadcast of Radio 1's Official UK Chart Show.
- 14 July – BBC radio programmes will be made available for download to smartphones and tablets for the first time within days.
- 31 July – The first of ten multiplexes trialling small-scale DAB multiplexes launches in Brighton. Each multiplex is initially licensed for nine months but the trial periods are later extended and the multiplexes are now licensed until March 2020.

=== August ===
- 6 August – Official figures released by RAJAR indicate that Nick Grimshaw's breakfast show has increased its audience in the second quarter of 2015, up from 5.5 million to 5.84 million. Figures for the first quarter were the lowest for the programme since Grimshaw succeeded Chris Moyles.
- 12 August – The National Union of Journalists announce that staff at the BBC Asian Network are to stage a one-day strike on 19 August in protest at planned cuts to the service.
- 13 August –
  - BBC Radio Solent presenter Alex Dyke is suspended after he told listeners during a phone in the previous day that breastfeeding in public was “unnatural” and “must be stopped”.
  - Labour Party London mayoral hopeful and practising Muslim Sadiq Khan criticises the talk radio station LBC for the way it reported the findings of a YouGov poll that asked whether Londoners would be comfortable with the idea of a Muslim mayor. Another Labour potential candidate, Christian Wolmar, criticises the station after he and another candidate hopeful were excluded from an on-air hustings meeting.

=== September ===
- 7 September –
  - Global announces that XFM will be relaunched as a national station called Radio X on 21 September.
  - Absolute Radio starts broadcasting on FM in the West Midlands, replacing Planet Rock.
- 13 September – Ahead of the relaunch of XFM as Radio X, Global hands back the Paisley licence, on which it had broadcast XFM Scotland, to Ofcom when the regulator refused Global's request to network 24/7 from London.
- 21 September – Chris Moyles returns to radio to present a breakfast show for Radio X to coincide with the relaunch of XFM as Radio X.

=== October ===
- 1 October –
  - BBC Radio 3 unveils its autumn schedule, with highlights including an appearance by playwright Alan Bennett on Private Passions, and actor Alec Baldwin on Essential Classics.
  - Plans to expand BBC Radio 5 Live Sports Extra are dropped for a second time over concerns over the impact it would have on commercial rivals such as Talksport.
- 6 October – After 27 years, the name BBC Radio London returns to the airwaves following a name change from BBC London 94.9.
- 8 October – Radio 4 marks National Poetry Day with a series of poems telling the story of Britain. We British: An Epic In Poetry runs throughout the day and sees Andrew Marr, Dominic West and Fiona Shaw reading works by names such as Walter Raleigh, William Shakespeare, Geoffrey Chaucer and William Wordsworth.
- 12 October – Manchester station Sunset 102 returns after 22 years as The New Sunset Radio with programming that is similar to the original and features many of the original DJs.

=== November ===
- 12–15 November – BBC Radio 3 joins with commercial station Jazz FM to operate a four-day pop-up station called BBC Music Jazz.

=== December ===
- 3 December – The last of the ten multiplexes trialling small-scale DAB multiplexes launches in Glasgow.
- 7 December – Liverpool stations Radio City 2 and Radio City Talk swap wavebands. City 2 moves from AM to FM with City Talk going in the opposite direction.
- 16 December – James Naughtie presents the Today programme for the final time after 21 years to become a special correspondent.

== Station debuts ==
- 12 January – Wandsworth Radio (later Riverside Radio)
- Undated in December – The VIP Lounge

== Programme debuts ==
- 17 January – Stumped on the BBC World Service (2015–Present)
- 25 February – Boswell's Lives on BBC Radio 4 (2015–2018)
- 18 September – Shush! on BBC Radio 4 (2015–2017)
- 18 November – Ankle Tag on BBC Radio 4 (2015 (Pilot), 2017–2020)

== Changes of network affiliation ==
Show	Moved from	Moved to
The Chris Moyles Show	BBC Radio 1	Radio X

== Returning this year after a break of one year or longer ==
- 21 September – The Chris Moyles Show on Radio X (2004–2012, 2015–Present)

== Continuing radio programmes ==
=== 1940s ===
- The Sunday Hour (1940–2018)
- Desert Island Discs (1942–Present)
- Woman's Hour (1946–Present)
- A Book at Bedtime (1949–Present)

=== 1950s ===
- The Archers (1950–Present)
- The Today Programme (1957–Present)

=== 1960s ===
- Farming Today (1960–Present)
- In Touch (1961–Present)
- The World at One (1965–Present)
- The Official Chart (1967–Present)
- Just a Minute (1967–Present)
- The Living World (1968–Present)
- The Organist Entertains (1969–2018)

=== 1970s ===
- PM (1970–Present)
- Start the Week (1970–Present)
- You and Yours (1970–Present)
- I'm Sorry I Haven't a Clue (1972–Present)
- Good Morning Scotland (1973–Present)
- Newsbeat (1973–Present)
- File on 4 (1977–Present)
- Money Box (1977–Present)
- The News Quiz (1977–Present)
- Feedback (1979–Present)
- The Food Programme (1979–Present)
- Science in Action (1979–Present)

=== 1980s ===
- Steve Wright in the Afternoon (1981–1993, 1999–2022)
- In Business (1983–Present)
- Sounds of the 60s (1983–Present)
- Loose Ends (1986–Present)

=== 1990s ===
- The Moral Maze (1990–Present)
- Essential Selection (1991–Present)
- Essential Mix (1993–Present)
- Up All Night (1994–Present)
- Wake Up to Money (1994–Present)
- Private Passions (1995–Present)
- In Our Time (1998–Present)
- Material World (1998–Present)
- Scott Mills (1998–2022)
- The Now Show (1998–Present)

=== 2000s ===
- BBC Radio 2 Folk Awards (2000–Present)
- Big John @ Breakfast (2000–Present)
- Sounds of the 70s (2000–2008, 2009–Present)
- Dead Ringers (2000–2007, 2014–Present)
- Kermode and Mayo's Film Review (2001–2022)
- A Kist o Wurds (2002–Present)
- Fighting Talk (2003–Present)
- Jeremy Vine (2003–Present)
- Annie Mac (2004–2021)
- Elaine Paige on Sunday (2004–Present)
- The Bottom Line (2006–Present)
- The Christian O'Connell Breakfast Show (2006–Present)
- The Unbelievable Truth (2006–Present)
- Radcliffe & Maconie (2007–Present)
- Geoff Lloyd's Hometime Show/Geoff Lloyd with Annabel Port (2008–2017)
- The Media Show (2008–Present)
- Newsjack (2009–Present)
- Paul O'Grady on the Wireless (2009–2022)
- Alan and Mel's Summer Escape (2009–2020)

=== 2010s ===
- The Chris Evans Breakfast Show (2010–2018)
- Graham Norton (2010–2020)
- Simon Mayo Drivetime (2010–2018)
- The Third Degree (2011–Present)
- BBC Radio 1's Dance Anthems (2012–Present)
- Late Night Graham Torrington (2012–2020)
- The Radio 1 Breakfast Show with Nick Grimshaw (2012–2018)
- Sounds of the 80s (2013–Present)
- Question Time Extra Time (2013–Present)
- The Show What You Wrote (2013–Present)
- Friday Sports Panel (2014–Present)
- Home Front (2014–Present)

== Ending this year ==
- 22 May – Fearne Cotton (2009–2015)
- 8 November – Weekend Wogan (2010–2015)

== Closing this year ==
Date	Station	Debut(s)
11 February	Radio Hafren	1993
19 October	Time 106.6	1993

== Deaths ==
- 22 March – Derek Chinnery, 89, controller (BBC Radio 1)
- 26 April – Colin Bloomfield, 33, presenter (BBC Radio Derby)
- 1 July – Edward Greenfield, 86, classical music critic and presenter
- 12 August – Ray Daniels, 52, presenter (West Sound, Real Radio Scotland)
- 2 November – Peter Donaldson, 70, newsreader
