= Bring Your Love =

Single by Madonna & Sabrina Carpenter

from the album Confessions II
- Released: April 30, 2026
- Studio: Republic (New York City); Start Here (London); Electric Lady (New York City)
- Genre: House; dance-pop
- Length: 3:36 (original); 2:55 (radio edit)
- Label: Warner
- Songwriters: Madonna Ciccone; Stuart Price; Roy Holman; Shanna Jackson; Kevin Saunderson
- Producers: Madonna; Stuart Price

Madonna singles chronology
"Vulgar" (2023)	"Bring Your Love" (2026)	"Love Sensation" (2026)

Sabrina Carpenter singles chronology
"House Tour" (2026)	"Bring Your Love" (2026)

Music video
- "Bring Your Love" on YouTube

"Bring Your Love" is a song by the American singers Madonna and Sabrina Carpenter. It was released on April 30, 2026, through Warner Records, as the lead single from Madonna's fifteenth studio album, Confessions II (2026). It was written and produced by Madonna and Stuart Price, with Italian duo Parisi providing additional production. Roy Holman, Shanna Jackson, and Kevin Saunderson received songwriting credits for the interpolation of Inner City's song "Good Life" (1988). A house and dance-pop song, its lyrics see Madonna and Carpenter addressing critics and rejecting external judgment regarding their careers and public personas.

The song received generally positive reviews from music critics, who praised its club-ready production and labeled it a blockbuster summer track. While some reviewers noted minor lyrical ambiguity, major praise was directed at Price's sleek production and the vocal dynamic between Madonna and Carpenter. Critics also compared its sonic direction to Madonna's 1990 single "Vogue". "Bring Your Love" debuted at number 74 on the US Billboard Hot 100, marking Madonna's highest debut on the chart since 2012, and reached the top 30 of the UK Singles Chart. The song became Madonna's first track in eighteen years to be added to BBC Radio 1's A-List playlist, topping the UK Airplay chart. It also charted in Australia, Canada, Belgium, France and on the Global 200 chart.

"Bring Your Love" was included in the musical short film Confessions II that accompanies the album, which was directed by TORSO and premiered on June 5, 2026. On June 15, 2026, the full version of the music video was released. The song was nominated for Best Pop Duo/Group Performance at the 69th Annual Grammy Awards and received two nominations for the 2026 MTV Video Music Awards, winning for Best Collaboration. Madonna and Carpenter performed it at Coachella 2026 and at the 2026 MTV Video Music Awards.

== Writing and recording ==
The song was written and produced by Madonna and Stuart Price, with additional production by Parisi. It interpolates Inner City's song "Good Life" (1988), therefore Roy Holman, Shanna Jackson, and Kevin Saunderson also received songwriting credits. According to Price, the song came from Madonna's and his desire to "spread the message", similarly to sampling ABBA's "Gimme! Gimme! Gimme! (A Man After Midnight)" in "Hung Up" on Confessions on a Dance Floor (2005). They decided to record a collaboration, which is "in itself a talking point". Their choice was Carpenter, who has been open about the influence Madonna had on her. After the collaboration offer was ignored by her team for five days, Madonna approached her over an Instagram direct message. Carpenter commented: "My team replies [...], but I respond faster."

Madonna explained the song's lyrics were inspired by her reluctance to think about the charts and streaming numbers, adding: "Algorithms and artificial intelligence are the opposite of taking risks and to me that is the opposite of making art." Price described the message of the song: "That it can either be about Madonna and Sabrina's shared experience in the music business, or it can be very specifically about Madonna's sense of what it’s like to be doubted and to be a fighter."

== Composition ==
"Bring Your Love"
A sample of the song's chorus, featuring Madonna and Carpenter singing together over the track's house and dance-pop composition.

"Bring Your Love" is a house and dance-pop song. It received comparisons to Madonna's 1990 song "Vogue", as well as Lady Gaga and Ariana Grande's 2020 song "Rain on Me". Robin Murray of Clash noted that "the New York house tinged production is boosted to stadium levels". Consequence's Paolo Ragusa felt it was a "dance-forward track almost scientifically designed for runway shows." Mark Savage from BBC News compared the "chunky piano house groove" to Madonna's 1989 song "Express Yourself".

According to Alyssa Bailey of Elle, the song addresses criticisms about Madonna's and Carpenter's public personas. She felt "they both remind the world that their love of music is what drives them to create art, not the feedback they receive." According to Pitchfork contributor Harry Tafoya, the song "operates on the idea that the dancefloor is a contested space where Madonna isn't fully welcome", adding that she "giving the track an unexpected jolt of neo-noir." Murray felt it "revels in two sides of female sexuality; Madonna's explicit, barrier-breaking eroticism, and Sabrina Carpenter's cartoonish reclaiming of her urges". Savage opined that "two titans of pop defend their right to explore female sexuality in all its forms". The Independent's Roisin O'Connor interprated the song: "Madonna seemingly hits back at misogynist attempts to keep her, or indeed any woman in pop, in a box."

== Release and promotion ==
On April 15, 2026, Madonna announced the release of her album Confessions II (2026). On April 27, Madonna and Carpenter revealed in a joint Instagram post that the song would be released on April 30 at 3 p.m. PT. In the post, they included a promotional graphic of the single, which consists of a black-and-white photo of Madonna and Carpenter standing side-by-side, encased in a red frame. Alongside the announcement, Madonna shared a snippet of the song. Billboard confirmed that it will serve as the album's lead single, after "I Feel So Free" was released as a promotional single. After the release, the song was used in the album's commercial starring Madonna and Anna Wintour, filmed during the Dolce & Gabbana fashion show in Milan and shown in selected theaters ahead of The Devil Wears Prada 2. Madonna would later use the song as part of her global ambassador campaign for Italian-based makeup brand Kiko Milano, as part of their global expansion campaign. The visual advertisement features an exclusive remix of "Bring Your Love", created by Stuart Price. The remix, subtitled "Stuart Price Afterhours Mix" and featuring only Madonna's vocals, was released on digital platforms on June 12, 2026. Additional remixes created by Honey Dijon were released on June 18, 2026. An exclusive vinyl edition of Confessions II on Madonna's official store includes a bonus 7" vinyl single featuring the original version and the Afterhours Edit of "Bring Your Love".

== Critical reception ==
Clash's Robin Murray described it as "frothy and intoxicating" and "an all-out blockbuster", adding that Carpenter "more than rises to the occasion" and "differing perspectives and voices helping to amplify the track". Lyndsey Havens of Billboard called it "alluring and hypnotic," adding it "is sure to start summer early, as it's essentially sonic bait to lure listeners out of the house and onto the nearest dance floor". Katie Bain, also from Billboard, described it as "fabulous, with the sly, frothy duet functioning as another moment of Madonna bridging generations of the pop A-list". Eric Henderson of Slant Magazine opined that the song "functions less like a collab and more like a torch being passed". The Independent's Roisin O'Connor deemed it "dazzling". John Murphy of musicOMH deemed it a "perfect summer dancefloor anthem".

Harry Tafoya of Pitchfork wrote that the premise of the song was "extremely vague and nonsensical", though he added that it was still "fun". He praised Price's production as "an elegant platform" for Madonna and Carpenter, and said the song's mix of "lyrical confusion and musical certainty" had a "trance-like" effect. Paste's Sam Rosenberg called it a "bouncy if slightly rote track". Sebas E. Alonso of Jenesaispop said the song was neither a musical revolution nor a major reinvention for Madonna, but viewed it as an accessible summer track that could introduce her to a younger audience. Paolo Ragusa of Consequence felt that the song "can't locate a chorus worthy of its beat". In their album's reviews, Ed Power of The Irish Times called Carpenter's guest appearance "forgettable", while Neil McCormick of The Daily Telegraph felt that "a collaboration with Sabrina Carpenter seems shoehorned in to prove [Madonna's] down with the kids".

== Commercial performance ==
In the United States, "Bring Your Love" debuted at number 74 on the Billboard Hot 100, with 4.1 million streams, 6.6 million airplay audience, and 3,000 pure sales earned during its first week of release, for the chart week dated May 16, 2026. It was the highest new entry that week, and became Madonna's fifty-ninth Hot 100 entry and Carpenter's thirty-fourth. It is Madonna's first entry on the chart since "Popular" (2023), and her highest debut since "Give Me All Your Luvin'", which opened at number 13 in February 2012. On the Dance Digital Song Sales chart, the song reached number one. Additionally, the song debuted at number 29 on the Pop Airplay chart, and at number 24 on the Adult Pop Airplay chart, for the chart week dated May 9, 2026. In Canada, "Bring Your Love" debuted at number 51 on the Canadian Hot 100.

In the United Kingdom, "Bring Your Love" debuted at number 29 on the UK singles chart, earning 13,557 equivalent sales in its first week. The track became Madonna's seventy-third top forty entry on the chart, her first since "Popular" (2023), and Carpenter's sixteenth. Additionally, it debuted at number one on the UK Airplay Chart, with 52.11 million audience impressions and 3,531 radio spins. "Bring Your Love" was the first Madonna song in eighteen years to be included on BBC Radio 1's A-List playlist, eleven years after the station was accused of ageism for declining to feature her track "Living for Love" (2014).

In Ireland, "Bring Your Love" debuted at number 44. Elsewhere, the track debuted at number 88 in Australia, number 49 in the Flanders region of Belgium, number 75 in Switzerland, and number 200 in France. In Japan, the track reached number 5 on the Hot Overseas chart. On the Billboard Global 200, "Bring Your Love" debuted at number 91, becoming Madonna's second entry on the chart since its inception in 2020, and Carpenter's ninth.

== Accolades ==
Awards and nominations
Award	Date	Category	Result	Ref.
BreakTudo Awards	November 24, 2026	International Collaboration of the Year	Pending	
MTV Video Music Awards	September 27, 2026	Song of the Year	Nominated	
MTV Video Music Awards	September 27, 2026	Best Collaboration	Won	
MTV Video Music Awards Japan	September 8, 2026	Best Collaboration Video (International)	Won	
MTV Video Music Awards Japan	October 29, 2026	Video of the Year	Nominated	
Nickelodeon Kids' Choice Awards	November 14, 2026	Favorite Music Collaboration	Nominated	
Grammy Awards	February 7, 2027	Best Pop Duo/Group Performance	Pending	

== Music video ==
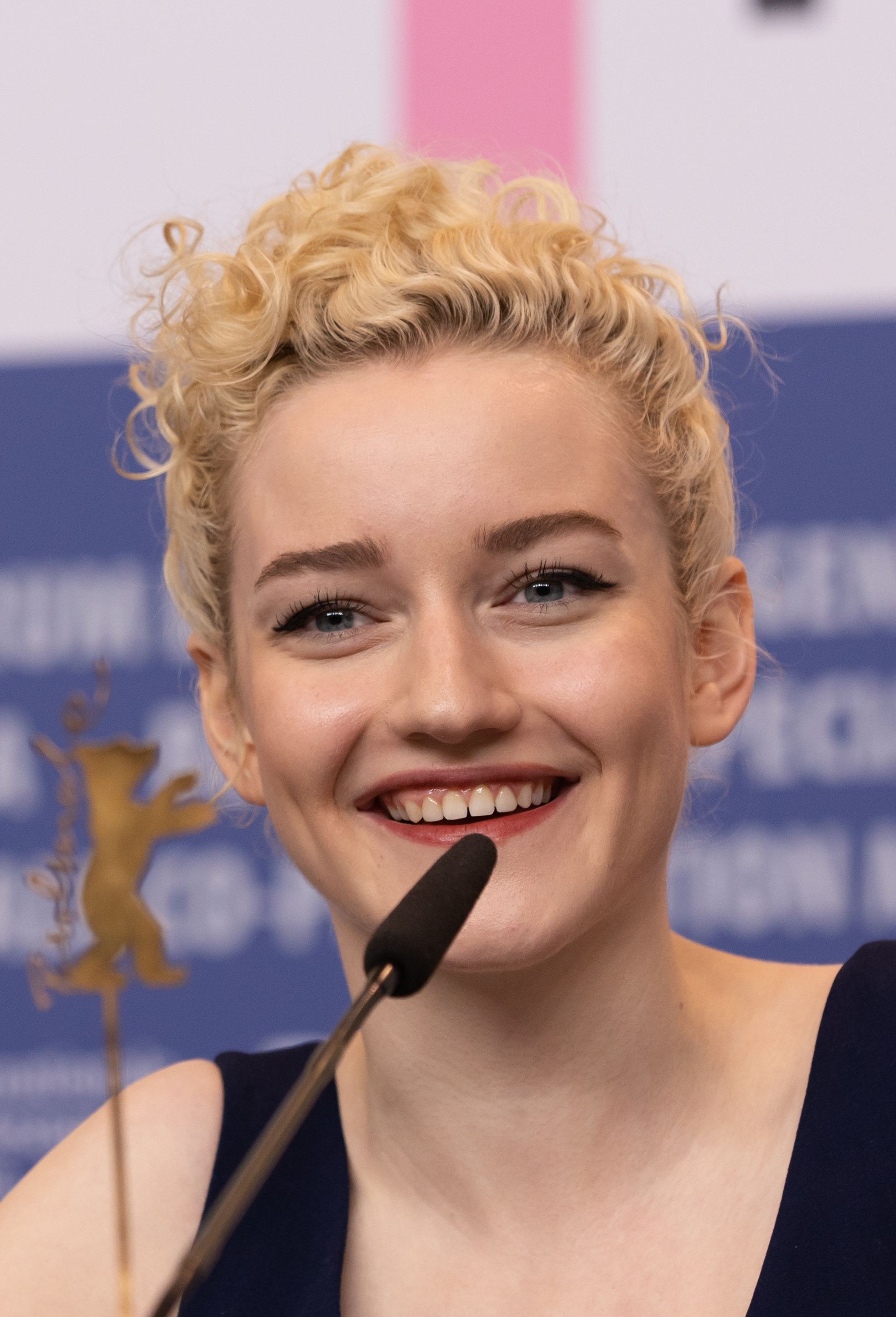
The video includes a cameo appearance by Julia Garner.

The accompanying music video was directed by TORSO (David Toro and Solomon Chase) and produced as a part of Madonna's musical short film Confessions II, where it was included in the shortened version. The film premiered on June 5, 2026, on the Tribeca Festival and was released three days later on YouTube. The full-length music video was released on June 15, 2026.

The video starts with Madonna entering an empty nightclub and strutting around on the dance floor. Then, the club is filled with many clubgoers, who quickly rush in from both sides, while Madonna is rolled up in a long carpet that is pushed down the dance floor, trying to get out of it. Afterwards, Madonna and Carpenter are performing on the respective corners of the club, described by Max Pilley of NME as "glossy, retro-future," with topless male dancers. They try to avoid the floating SWAT team who are spying on the crowd. Toward the end of the video, they strut toward one another on a long catwalk and come together before raising their arms. Ultimately, they float above the watching crowd. The video includes a cameo appearance by Julia Garner, whose look was described by Jon Blistein of Rolling Stone as reminiscent of the 1980s Madonna. At the end of the video, Madonna walks down a hallway and into a doorway decorated with a poster "Come to the Club of Love."

== Live performances ==
On April 17, 2026, Madonna joined Carpenter onstage as a surprise guest during her set at Coachella 2026. They performed "Bring Your Love" prior to its release, along with Madonna's songs "Vogue" and "Like a Prayer" (1989). On June 4, 2026, Madonna performed the song during the surprise free Pride Month concert at the Square in Times Square, produced and live streamed by Grindr.

On September 27, 2026, Madonna opened the 2026 MTV Video Music Awards with the medley of "Bring Your Love" with Carpenter and "Danceteria Afterhours" with Charli XCX, marking her first performance on the VMA since 2003. The show began with the instrumental intro from "One Step Away", concluded with the pre-recorded voice of Madonna saying "It's motha". Afterwards, "Bring Your Love" started from an acoustic part, with Carpenter playing the piano, on which Madonna sat. Carpenter wore a black-and-white glittery ensemble along with a beret, compared to Madonna's 1980s style by Anja Stanković of Vogue Adria. Madonna wore a black waistcoat and knee-high boots. After the acoustic intro, the performance turned into an "all-out dance-floor rave", as desribed by Billboard's Kyle Denis, for which Madonna removed her coat to reveal a red-and-black corset. It included green lasers and dancers portraying the steadicam operators following them. Joey Nolfi of Entertainment Weekly opined that the singers "recreated the club-set runway duel" of the Confessions II film. After Carpenter left the stage, dancers lifted Madonna onto a moving platform, on which she performed choreography for the song's refrain, belted out by the gospel choir in white gowns. Denis compared the part with "Like a Prayer". Rob Sheffield of Rolling Stone called the medley "one of the most stunning performances in the entire history of the VMAs".

== Formats and track listings ==
Digital download / streaming
No.	Title	Length
1.	"Bring Your Love"	3:36
Total length:		3:36

Digital download / streaming (Stuart Price Afterhours Mix)
No.	Title	Length
1.	"Bring Your Love" (Stuart Price Afterhours Mix)	5:35
2.	"Bring Your Love"	3:42
Total length:		9:17

Digital download / streaming (Honey Dijon Remixes)
No.	Title	Length
1.	"Bring Your Love" (Peaktime Dub Remix)	4:29
2.	"Bring Your Love" (Twilight Mix)	7:13
3.	"Bring Your Love"	3:36
Total length:		15:18

== Credits and personnel ==
The credits are adapted from Madonna's official website and Tidal.

- Madonna – vocals, songwriting, producer
- Sabrina Carpenter – vocals
- Stuart Price – songwriting, producer, programming, keyboards, bass, drums, engineering, mixing
- Roy Holamn – songwriting
- Shanna Jackson – songwriting
- Kevin Saunderson – songwriting
- Parisi – additional producers

- Marco Parisi – bass, keyboards
- Giampaolo Parisi – drums, programming

- Madonna – executive producer
- Laura Sisk – engineering
- Gloria Colston – engineering assistance
- Jack Manning – engineering assistance
- Ruairi O'Flaherty – mastering
- Miles Showell – vinyl master cut

Recorded at Republic Studios (New York City), Start Here (London) and Electric Lady Studios (New York City). Mixed at Start Here (London). Mastered at Sterling Sound (Los Angeles). Vinyl master cut at Abbey Road Studios (London).

== Charts ==
=== Weekly charts ===
Weekly chart performance
Chart (2026)	Peak position
Argentina Anglo Airplay (Monitor Latino)	6
Australia (ARIA)	88
Austria Airplay (IFPI Austria)	39
Belarus Airplay (TopHit)	161
Belgium (Ultratop 50 Flanders)	48
Belgium (Ultratop 50 Wallonia)	15
Bolivia Anglo Airplay (Monitor Latino)	4
Bulgaria Airplay (PROPHON)	8
Canada Hot 100 (Billboard)	51
Canada AC (Billboard)	13
Canada CHR/Top 40 (Billboard)	30
Canada Hot AC (Billboard)	21
Central America Anglo Airplay (Monitor Latino)	10
Chile Airplay (Monitor Latino)	17
CIS Airplay (TopHit)	49
Costa Rica Anglo Airplay (Monitor Latino)	10
Croatia International Airplay (Top lista)	9
Czech Republic Airplay (ČNS IFPI)	17
Ecuador Anglo Airplay (Monitor Latino)	5
Estonia Airplay (TopHit)	66
France (SNEP)	200
Germany Airplay (BVMI)	49
Global 200 (Billboard)	91
Greece International (IFPI)	48
Guatemala Anglo Airplay (Monitor Latino)	7
Honduras Airplay (Monitor Latino)	11
Ireland (IRMA)	44
Italy Airplay (EarOne)	1
Japan Hot 100 (Billboard)	16
Kazakhstan Airplay (TopHit)	44
Latin America Anglo Airplay (Monitor Latino)	7
Latvia Airplay (TopHit)	51
Lithuania Airplay (TopHit)	23
Malta Airplay (Radiomonitor)	9
Netherlands (Single Tip)	4
Netherlands Airplay (Radiomonitor)	46
New Zealand Hot Singles (RMNZ)	4
Nicaragua Anglo Airplay (Monitor Latino)	4
North Macedonia Airplay (Radiomonitor)	1
Panama Anglo Airplay (Monitor Latino)	7
Paraguay Airplay (Monitor Latino)	7
Peru Anglo Airplay (Monitor Latino)	13
Poland Airplay (OLiS)	61
Portugal (AFP)	135
Puerto Rico Anglo Airplay (Monitor Latino)	9
Russia Airplay (TopHit)	54
San Marino Airplay (SMRTV Top 50)	1
Serbia Airplay (Radiomonitor)	2
Slovakia Airplay (ČNS IFPI)	49
South Africa Airplay (TOSAC)	4
Spain Airplay (Promusicae)	14
Sweden Heatseeker (Sverigetopplistan)	5
Switzerland (Schweizer Hitparade)	75
UK Singles (Official Charts)	29
Uruguay Anglo Airplay (Monitor Latino)	5
US Billboard Hot 100	74
US Adult Contemporary (Billboard)	27
US Adult Pop Airplay (Billboard)	20
US Dance Airplay (Billboard)	36
US Hot Dance/Pop Songs (Billboard)	7
US Pop Airplay (Billboard)	22
Venezuela Anglo Airplay (Monitor Latino)	3

=== Monthly charts ===
Monthly chart performance
Chart (2026)	Peak position
CIS Airplay (TopHit)	59
Estonia Airplay (TopHit)	83
Kazakhstan Airplay (TopHit)	45
Latvia Airplay (TopHit)	97
Lithuania Airplay (TopHit)	31
Paraguay Airplay (SGP)	21
Russia Airplay (TopHit)	87

== Release history ==
Release history
Region	Date	Format(s)	Version	Label(s)	Ref.
Various	April 30, 2026	Digital download; streaming	Original	Warner	
Italy	May 1, 2026	Radio airplay	Original	Warner; Island	
United Kingdom	May 1, 2026	Radio airplay	Original	Warner	
United States	May 4, 2026	Hot adult contemporary radio	Original	Warner	
United States	May 5, 2026	Contemporary hit radio	Original	Warner	
Various	June 12, 2026	Digital download; streaming	Stuart Price Afterhours mix	Warner	
Various	June 18, 2026	Digital download; streaming	Honey Dijon remixes	Warner	
Various	July 3, 2026	7-inch vinyl	Original; Afterhours remix	Warner	
