= 2026 MTV Video Music Awards Japan =

24th edition of the MTV Video Music Awards Japan held in 2026

- Date: October 29, 2026
- Location: Tokyo Dome, Tokyo
- Country: Japan
- Hosted by: Hiccorohee; Seiya (Shimofuri Myojo)

Highlights
- Most awards: Mrs. Green Apple (5)
- Website: vmaj.jp

Television/radio coverage
- Network: MTV Japan

The 2026 MTV Video Music Awards Japan were held at Tokyo Dome in Tokyo, Japan, on October 29, 2026. The 24th edition of the ceremony, and the first held at Tokyo Dome, was hosted by Hiccorohee and Seiya of the comedy duo Shimofuri Myojo. The awards honored music videos released between January 1, 2025, and August 31, 2026.

Mrs. Green Apple won five awards, including Video of the Year for "Brand New", becoming the first act to receive the award in three consecutive editions. The ceremony was scheduled for broadcast on MTV Japan and streaming on Telasa on November 15, 2026.

== Winners and nominees ==
The winners in the 30 music video categories were announced on September 8, 2026. The category-winning videos were eligible for the public vote for Video of the Year, which closed on September 23; the winner was announced at the ceremony on October 29.

=== Video of the Year ===
The winner of Video of the Year was announced at the ceremony on October 29, 2026.

Video of the Year
- Mrs. Green Apple – "Brand New"

- Aina the End – "革命道中 - On The Way"
- Aimyon – "ビーナスベルト"
- back number – "ブルーアンバー"
- BTS – "SWIM"
- Cho Tokimeki Sendenbu – "超最強"
- EBiDAN – "Yes! 東京"
- =Love – "とくべチュ、して"
- =Love – "劇薬中毒"
- Fujii Kaze – "Hachikō"
- HANA – "ROSE"
- – "Quartet"
- JO1 – "BE CLASSIC"
- Kenshi Yonezu and Hikaru Utada – "JANE DOE"
- Kvi Baba – "BPM feat. KREVA"
- M!LK – "好きすぎて滅！"
- Madonna and Sabrina Carpenter – "Bring Your Love"
- Motoki Ohmori – "催し"
- Mrs. Green Apple – "lulu."
- Mrs. Green Apple – "クスシキ"
- Nogizaka46 – "最後に階段を駆け上がったのはいつだ？"
- ≠ME – "愛くださいませ"
- Sakanaction – "怪獣"
- SixTONES – "Dance Forever"
- SixTONES – "一秒"
- SixTONES – "マイオンリー"
- sombr – "12 to 12"
- SUPER BEAVER – "燦然"
- Taylor Swift – "The Fate of Ophelia"
- XG – "GALA"

=== Category winners ===
The winners of the following categories were announced on September 8, 2026.

Best Solo Artist Video (Japan)	Best Solo Artist Video (International)
Aina the End – "革命道中 - On The Way"	Taylor Swift – "The Fate of Ophelia"
Best Group Video (Japan)	Best Group Video (International)
SixTONES – "Dance Forever"	BTS – "SWIM"
Best New Artist Video (Japan)	Best New Artist Video (International)
HANA – "ROSE"	sombr – "12 to 12"
Best Collaboration Video (Japan)	Best Collaboration Video (International)
Kenshi Yonezu and Hikaru Utada – "JANE DOE"	Madonna and Sabrina Carpenter – "Bring Your Love"
Best Dance & Vocal Group Video	Best Idol Video
JO1 – "BE CLASSIC"	=Love – "とくべチュ、して"
Best Rock Video	Best Alternative Video
SUPER BEAVER – "燦然"	Mrs. Green Apple – "lulu."
Best Pop Video	Best R&B Video
SixTONES – "一秒"	Fujii Kaze – "Hachikō"
Best Hip Hop Video	Best Electronic Video
Kvi Baba – "BPM feat. KREVA"	XG – "GALA"
Best Dance Video	Best Choreography
Motoki Ohmori – "催し"	M!LK – "好きすぎて滅！"
Best Trending Video	Best Buzz Video
EBiDAN – "Yes! 東京"	Cho Tokimeki Sendenbu – "超最強"
Best Creative Video	Best Art Direction Video
Sakanaction – "怪獣"	Aimyon – "ビーナスベルト"
Best Style Video	Best Conceptual Video
Nogizaka46 – "最後に階段を駆け上がったのはいつだ？"	≠ME – "愛くださいませ"
Best Visual Effects	Best Cinematography
Mrs. Green Apple – "クスシキ"	SixTONES – "マイオンリー"
Best Editing	Best Direction
Mrs. Green Apple – "Brand New"	=Love – "劇薬中毒"
Best Storytelling Video	Best Breakthrough Video
back number – "ブルーアンバー"	– "Quartet"

=== Special awards ===
Artist of the Year	Group of the Year
BTS	SixTONES
Song of the Year	Album of the Year
Kenshi Yonezu – "IRIS OUT"	Fujii Kaze – Prema
Best Live Production	Inspiration Award Japan
Mrs. Green Apple – DOME TOUR 2025 "BABEL no TOH"	SPEED
Best Producer	Performance of the Year
Rino Sashihara	&TEAM
Best Asia Song	Best Live Performance
&TEAM – "Back to Life"	
Best Asia Group	Best Breakthrough Artist
INI	MAZZEL
Rising Star Award	Best Revival Song
STARGLOW	Orange Range – "イケナイ太陽"
MTV Breakthrough Song	Best Teen Choice Artist presented by minimo
M!LK – "好きすぎて滅！"	EBiDAN
Best Family Choice Artist presented by 家族アルバム みてね	Daisy Bell Award
=Love	r-906 – "匙ノ咒"
Future Icons Award
PURPLE BUBBLE; 梓川 (Azusagawa); Cocoa & JEWEL; 岬小次郎 (Kojiro Misaki); ponytailmama; Pxrge Trxxxper; Tee Shyne; やみの おねえさん／タマ (教育番組)
