= MTV Video Music Award for Best Collaboration =

Annual music video award

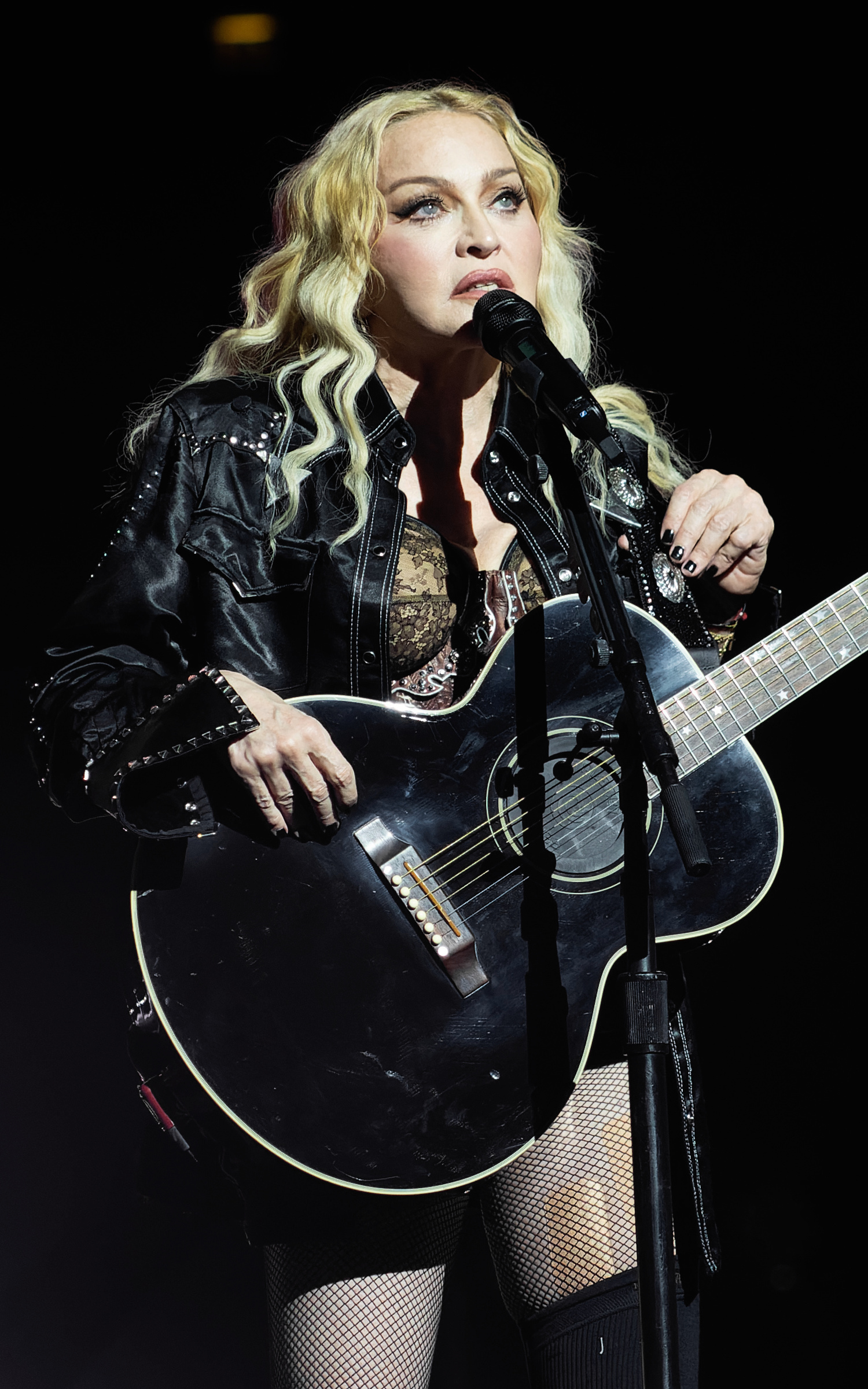
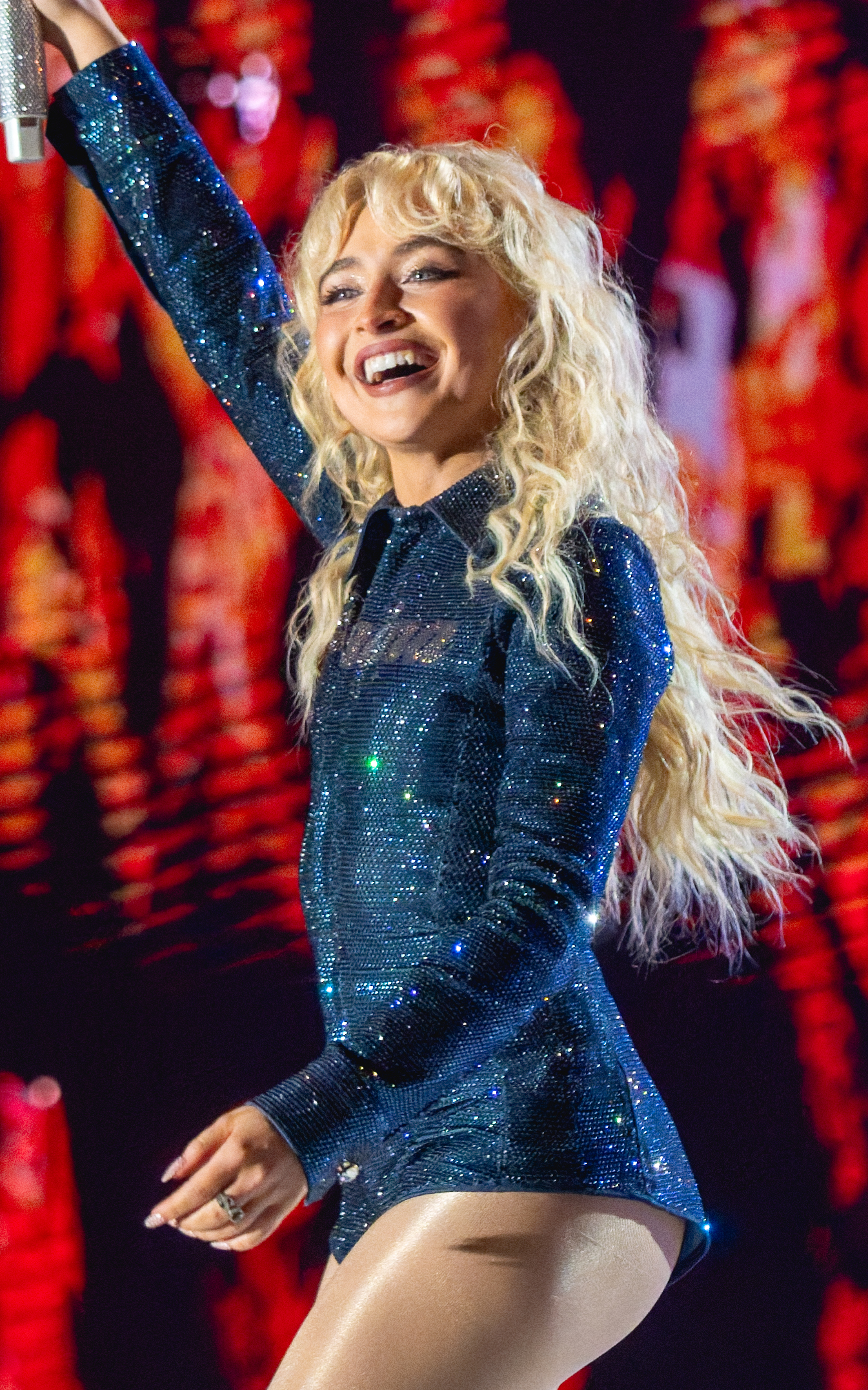
- Madonna & Sabrina Carpenter are the most recent recipients for "Bring Your Love"
- Awarded for: Collaborative music videos
- Country: United States
- Presented by: MTV
- First award: 2007
- Currently held by: Madonna and Sabrina Carpenter – "Bring Your Love" (2026)

Highlights
- Most awards: Beyoncé, Taylor Swift and Lady Gaga (3)
- Most nominations: Rihanna, Ariana Grande & Drake (6)
- Website: VMA website

The MTV Video Music Award for Best Collaboration is given at the annual MTV Video Music Awards. The category was first introduced at the 2007 MTV Video Music Awards under the name Most Earthshattering Collaboration, as the VMAs were revamped and a few new categories were added to the show. When MTV brought the VMAs back to their old format in 2008, this category did not return. It was not until 2010 that the category was reintroduced under the name Best Collaboration.

Beyoncé, Lady Gaga and Taylor Swift have received the most wins in this category with three moonmen each. Beyoncé won for "Beautiful Liar" with Shakira (2007), "Telephone" with Lady Gaga (2010) and "Drunk in Love" with Jay-Z (2014); Taylor Swift won for "Bad Blood" with Kendrick Lamar (2015), "I Don't Wanna Live Forever" with Zayn (2017) and "Fortnight" with Post Malone (2024); and Lady Gaga won for "Telephone" with Beyoncé (2010), "Rain on Me" with Ariana Grande (2020), and "Die with a Smile" with Bruno Mars (2025). Shakira won in this category 2 times: "Beautiful Liar" with Beyoncé (2007) and "TQG" with Karol G (2023).

Ariana Grande, Drake and Rihanna are the most nominated artists with six nominations, followed by Beyoncé, Lady Gaga and Post Malone with five.

== Recipients ==
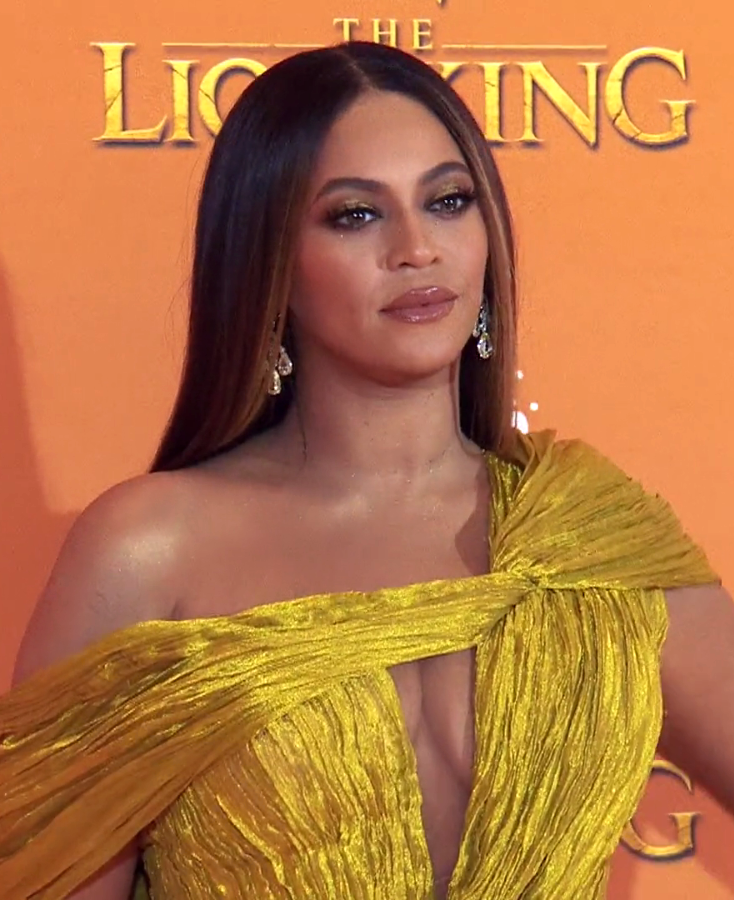
Inaugural winner Beyoncé is one of the category's most awarded artists, winning three times.

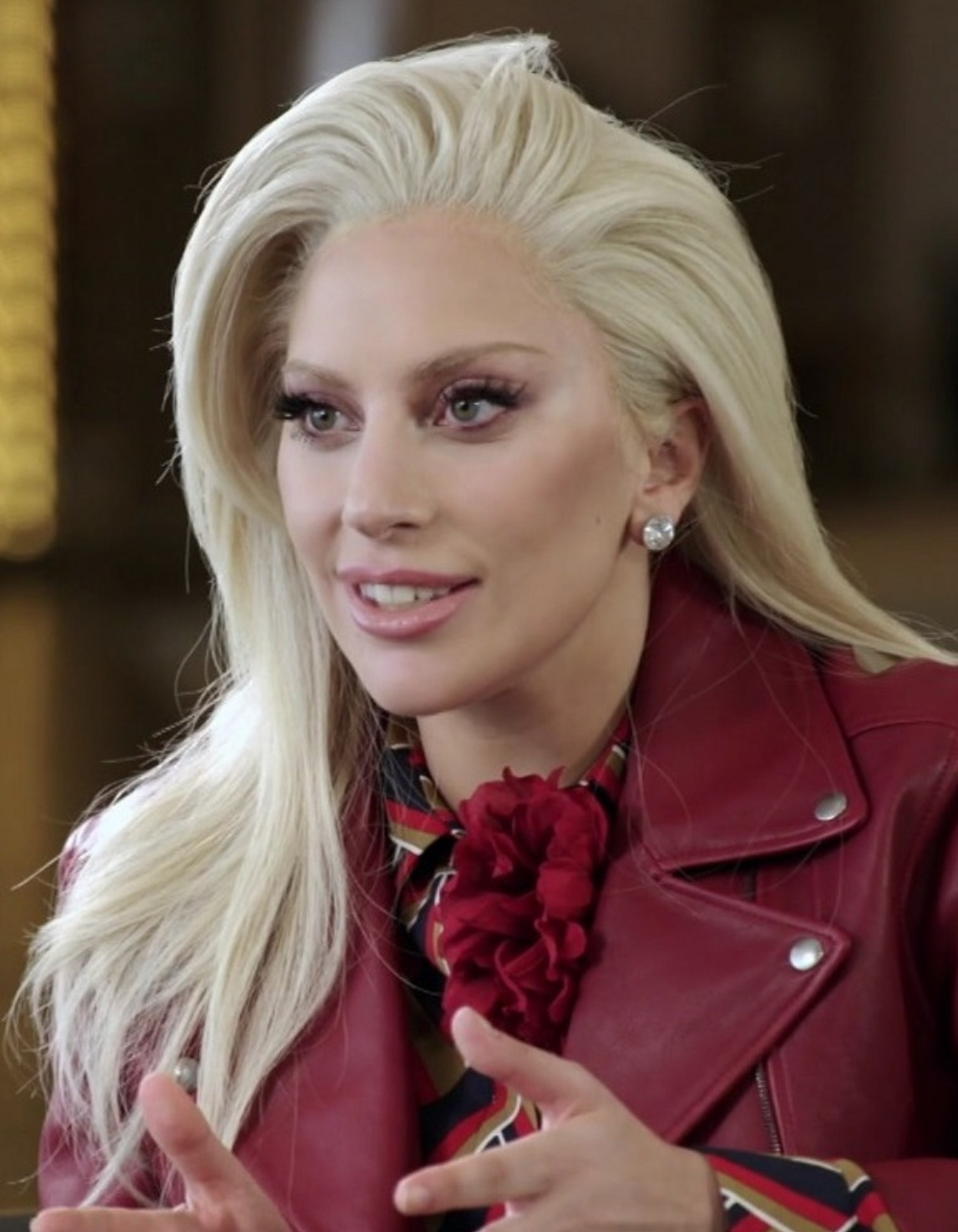
Lady Gaga is one of the category's most awarded artists, winning three times.

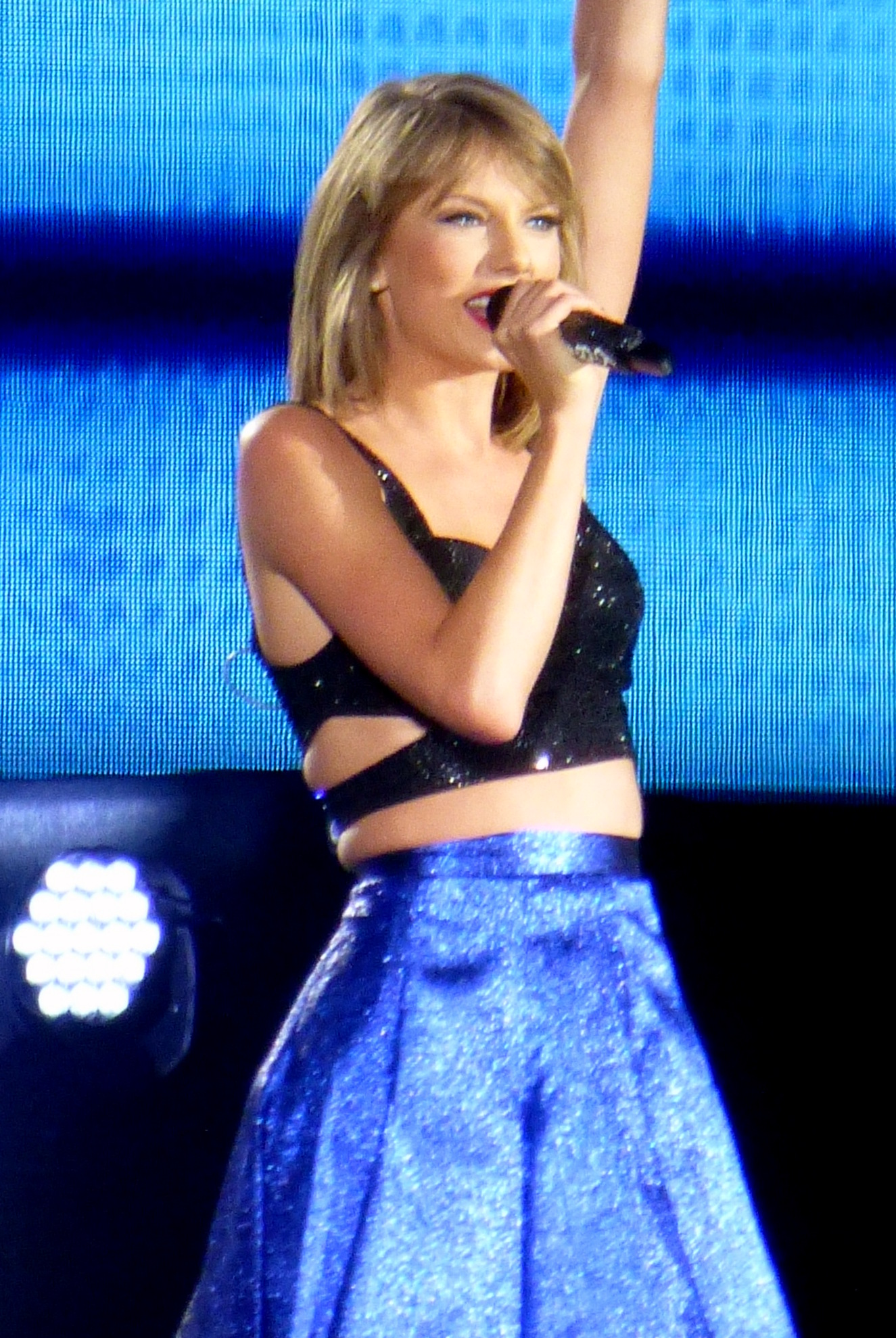
Taylor Swift is one of the category's most awardest artists, winning three times.

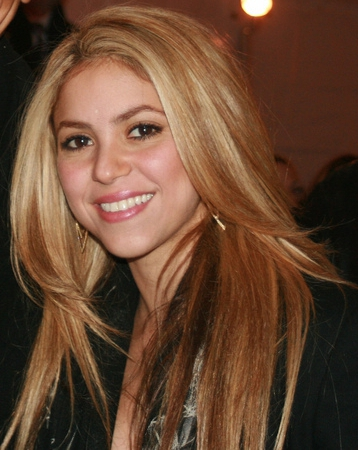
Inaugural winner Shakira. She also won the award in 2023 with the first all-Latin American female artist collaboration with Karol G.

Ariana Grande ties Rihanna as the most nominated female artists of the category with six, one of which she won.

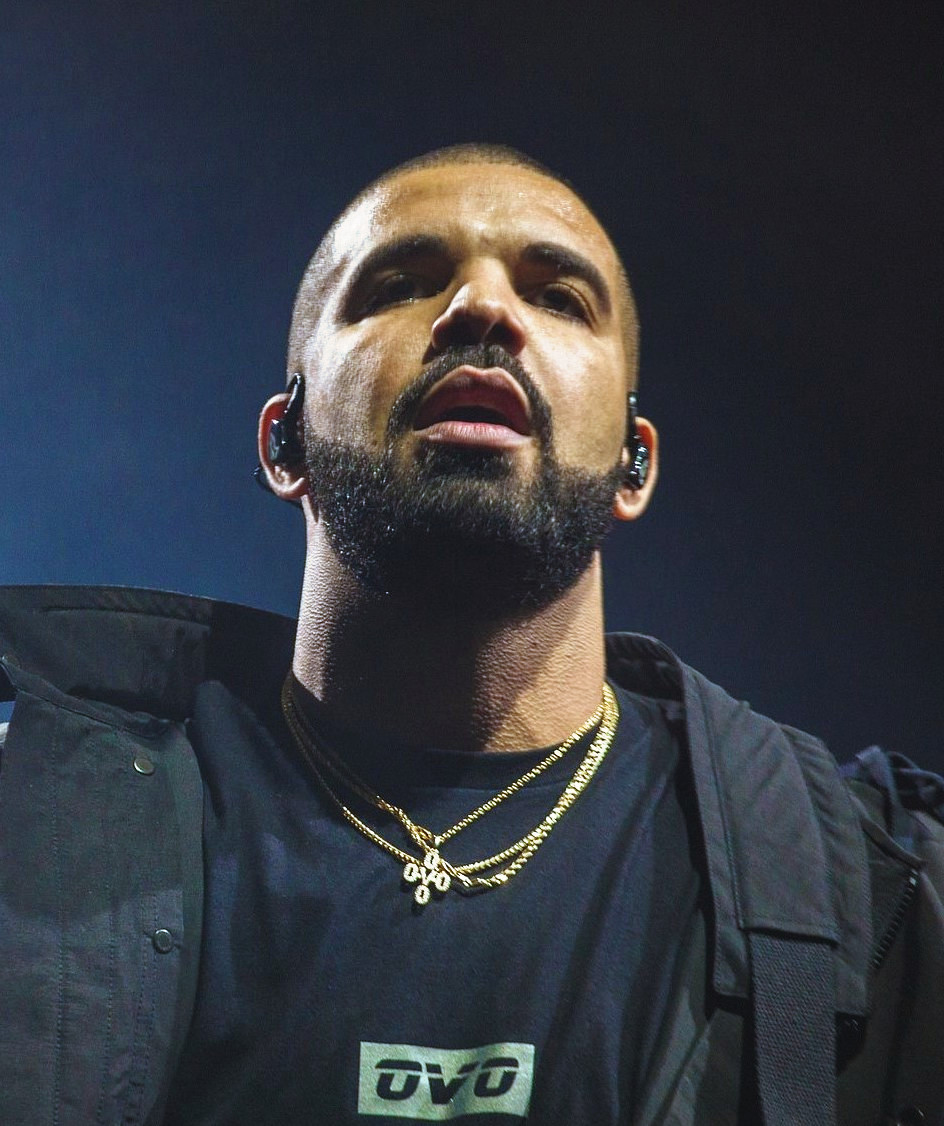
Drake is the most nominated male artist with six.

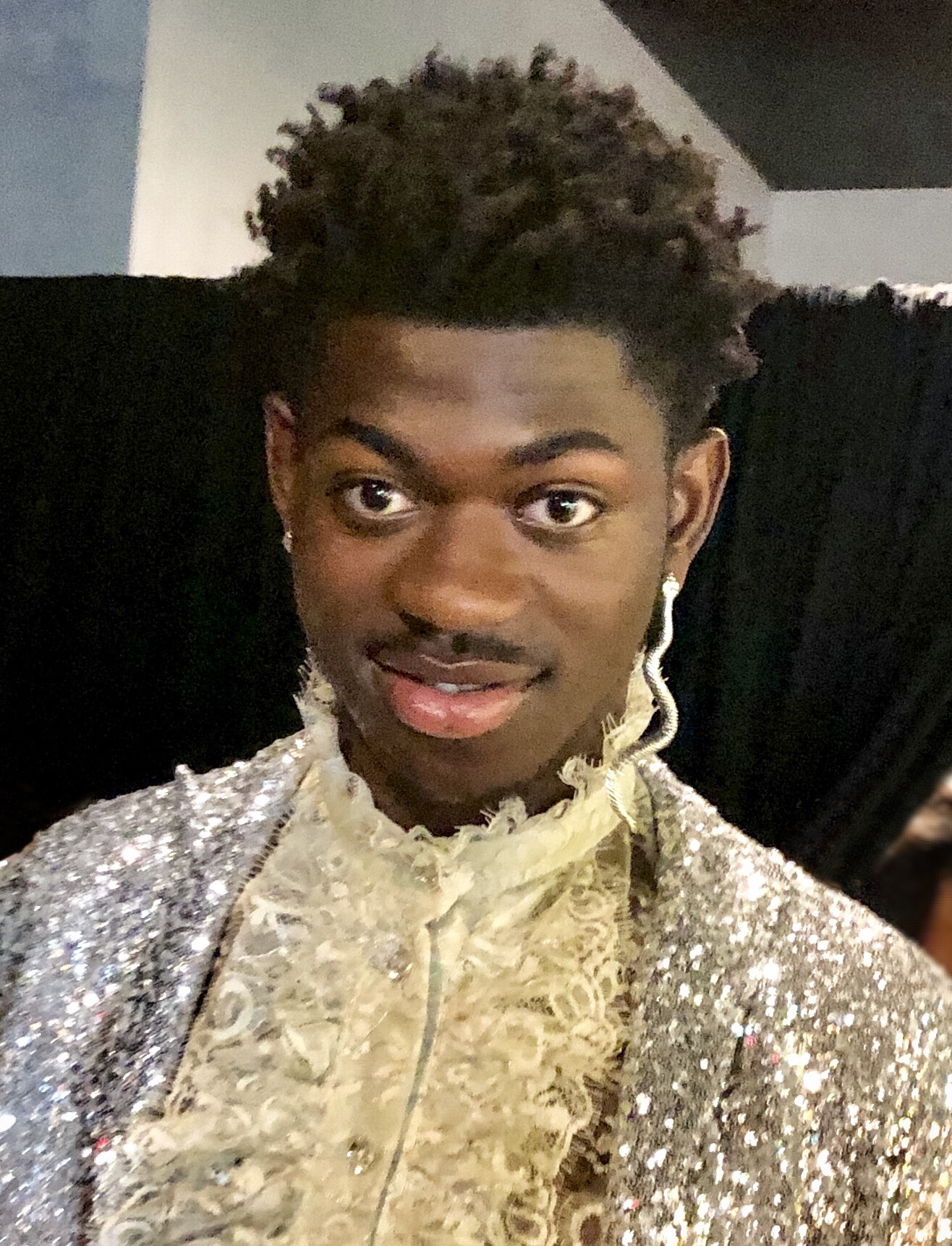
Lil Nas X was the first to be recognised with an all-male collaboration with Jack Harlow in 2022.

=== 2000s ===
Recipients
Year (Note: Each year is linked to the article about the MTV Video Music Awards held that year.)	Winner(s)	Video	Nominees	Ref.
2007	Beyoncé and Shakira	"Beautiful Liar"	Akon (featuring Eminem) – "Smack That"; Gwen Stefani (featuring Akon) – "The Sweet Escape"; Justin Timberlake (featuring Timbaland) – "SexyBack"; U2 and Green Day – "The Saints Are Coming"	
2008	—N/a			
2009	—N/a			

=== 2010s ===
Recipients
Year (Note: Each year is linked to the article about the MTV Video Music Awards held that year.)	Winner(s)	Video	Nominees	Ref.
2010	Lady Gaga (featuring Beyoncé)	"Telephone"	3OH!3 (featuring Ke$ha) – "My First Kiss"; Beyoncé (featuring Lady Gaga) – "Video Phone (Extended Remix)"; B.o.B (featuring Hayley Williams) – "Airplanes"; Jay-Z and Alicia Keys – "Empire State of Mind"	
2011	Katy Perry (featuring Kanye West)	"E.T."	Chris Brown (featuring Lil Wayne and Busta Rhymes) – "Look at Me Now"; Nicki Minaj (featuring Drake) – "Moment 4 Life"; Pitbull (featuring Ne-Yo, Nayer and Afrojack) – "Give Me Everything"; Kanye West (featuring Rihanna and Kid Cudi) – "All of the Lights"	
2012	—N/a			
2013	Pink (featuring Nate Ruess)	"Just Give Me a Reason"	Calvin Harris (featuring Ellie Goulding) – "I Need Your Love"; Pitbull (featuring Christina Aguilera) – "Feel This Moment"; Robin Thicke (featuring T.I. and Pharrell) – "Blurred Lines"; Justin Timberlake (featuring Jay-Z) – "Suit & Tie"	
2014	Beyoncé (featuring Jay-Z)	"Drunk in Love"	Chris Brown (featuring Lil Wayne and Tyga) – "Loyal"; Eminem (featuring Rihanna) – "The Monster"; Ariana Grande (featuring Iggy Azalea) – "Problem"; Katy Perry (featuring Juicy J) – "Dark Horse"; Pitbull (featuring Kesha) – "Timber"	
2015	Taylor Swift (featuring Kendrick Lamar)	"Bad Blood"	Ariana Grande and The Weeknd – "Love Me Harder"; Jessie J, Ariana Grande and Nicki Minaj – "Bang Bang"; Mark Ronson (featuring Bruno Mars) – "Uptown Funk"; Wiz Khalifa (featuring Charlie Puth) – "See You Again"	
2016	Fifth Harmony (featuring Ty Dolla $ign)	"Work from Home"	Beyoncé (featuring Kendrick Lamar) – "Freedom"; Ariana Grande (featuring Lil Wayne) – "Let Me Love You"; Calvin Harris (featuring Rihanna) – "This Is What You Came For"; Rihanna (featuring Drake) – "Work"	
2017	ZAYN and Taylor Swift	"I Don't Wanna Live Forever"	The Chainsmokers (featuring Halsey) – "Closer"; DJ Khaled (featuring Rihanna and Bryson Tiller) – "Wild Thoughts"; DRAM (featuring Lil Yachty) – "Broccoli"; Calvin Harris (featuring Pharrell Williams, Katy Perry and Big Sean) – "Feels"; Charlie Puth (featuring Selena Gomez) – "We Don't Talk Anymore"	
2018	Jennifer Lopez (featuring DJ Khaled and Cardi B)	"Dinero"	The Carters – "Apeshit"; Logic (featuring Alessia Cara and Khalid) – "1-800-273-8255"; Bruno Mars (featuring Cardi B) – "Finesse (Remix)"; N.E.R.D. and Rihanna – "Lemon"; Bebe Rexha (featuring Florida Georgia Line) – "Meant to Be"	
2019	Shawn Mendes and Camila Cabello	"Señorita"	BTS (featuring Halsey) – "Boy with Luv"; Lady Gaga and Bradley Cooper – "Shallow"; Lil Nas X (featuring Billy Ray Cyrus) – "Old Town Road (Remix)"; Ed Sheeran and Justin Bieber – "I Don't Care"; Taylor Swift (featuring Brendon Urie of Panic! at the Disco) – "Me!"	

=== 2020s ===
Recipients
Year (Note: Each year is linked to the article about the MTV Video Music Awards held that year.)	Winner(s)	Video	Nominees	Ref.
2020	Lady Gaga with Ariana Grande	"Rain on Me"	Black Eyed Peas and J Balvin – "Ritmo (Bad Boys for Life)"; Future (featuring Drake) – "Life Is Good"; Ariana Grande and Justin Bieber – "Stuck with U"; Karol G (featuring Nicki Minaj) – "Tusa"; Ed Sheeran (featuring Khalid) – "Beautiful People"	
2021	Doja Cat (featuring SZA)	"Kiss Me More"	24kGoldn (featuring Iann Dior) – "Mood"; Justin Bieber (featuring Daniel Caesar and Giveon) – "Peaches"; Cardi B (featuring Megan Thee Stallion) – "WAP"; Miley Cyrus (featuring Dua Lipa) – "Prisoner"; Drake (featuring Lil Durk) – "Laugh Now Cry Later"	
2022	Lil Nas X and Jack Harlow	"Industry Baby"	Drake (featuring Future and Young Thug) – "Way 2 Sexy"; Elton John and Dua Lipa – "Cold Heart (Pnau remix)"; The Kid Laroi and Justin Bieber – "Stay"; Megan Thee Stallion and Dua Lipa – "Sweetest Pie"; Post Malone and The Weeknd – "One Right Now"; Rosalía (featuring The Weeknd) – "La Fama"	
2023	Karol G and Shakira	"TQG"	Diddy (featuring Bryson Tiller, Ashanti and Yung Miami) – "Gotta Move On (Queens Remix)"; David Guetta and Bebe Rexha – "I'm Good (Blue)"; Post Malone with Doja Cat – "I Like You (A Happier Song)"; Metro Boomin with the Weeknd, 21 Savage and Diddy – "Creepin' (Remix)"; Rema and Selena Gomez – "Calm Down"	
2024	Taylor Swift (featuring Post Malone)	"Fortnight"	Drake (featuring Sexyy Red and SZA) – "Rich Baby Daddy"; GloRilla and Megan Thee Stallion – "Wanna Be"; Jungkook (featuring Latto) – "Seven"; Post Malone (featuring Morgan Wallen) – "I Had Some Help"; Jessie Murph (featuring Jelly Roll) – "Wild Ones"	
2025	Lady Gaga and Bruno Mars	"Die with a Smile"	Bailey Zimmerman and Luke Combs – "Backup Plan"; Kendrick Lamar and SZA – "Luther"; Post Malone featuring Blake Shelton – "Pour Me a Drink"; Rosé and Bruno Mars – "APT."; Selena Gomez and Benny Blanco – "Sunset Blvd"	
2026	Madonna and Sabrina Carpenter	"Bring Your Love"	Clipse, Kendrick Lamar, Pusha T and Malice – "Chains & Whips"; French Montana and Max B – "Ever Since U Left Me"; PinkPantheress and Zara Larsson – "Stateside"; Shakira and Burna Boy – "Dai Dai"; Teyana Taylor and Lucky Daye – "Hard Part"	

== Statistics ==
=== Artists with multiple wins ===
3 wins

- Beyoncé
- Taylor Swift
- Lady Gaga

2 wins

- Shakira

=== Artists with multiple nominations ===
6 nominations

- Rihanna
- Ariana Grande
- Drake

5 nominations

- Beyoncé
- Lady Gaga
- Post Malone

4 nominations

- Justin Bieber
- The Weeknd
- Taylor Swift
- Bruno Mars

3 nominations

- Calvin Harris
- Jay-Z
- Katy Perry
- Lil Wayne
- Nicki Minaj
- Pitbull
- Cardi B
- Dua Lipa
- Megan Thee Stallion
- Kendrick Lamar
- SZA
- Selena Gomez
- Shakira

2 nominations

- Kesha
- Ed Sheeran
- Lil Nas X
- Future
- Bebe Rexha
- Doja Cat
- Diddy
- Bryson Tiller
- Karol G
- Chris Brown
- Eminem
- Justin Timberlake
- Pharrell
- Halsey
- Akon
- Khalid
- Charlie Puth
- Kanye West
- DJ Khaled

== See also ==
- MTV Europe Music Award for Best Collaboration
