= Radio 1 Madonna controversy =

Event

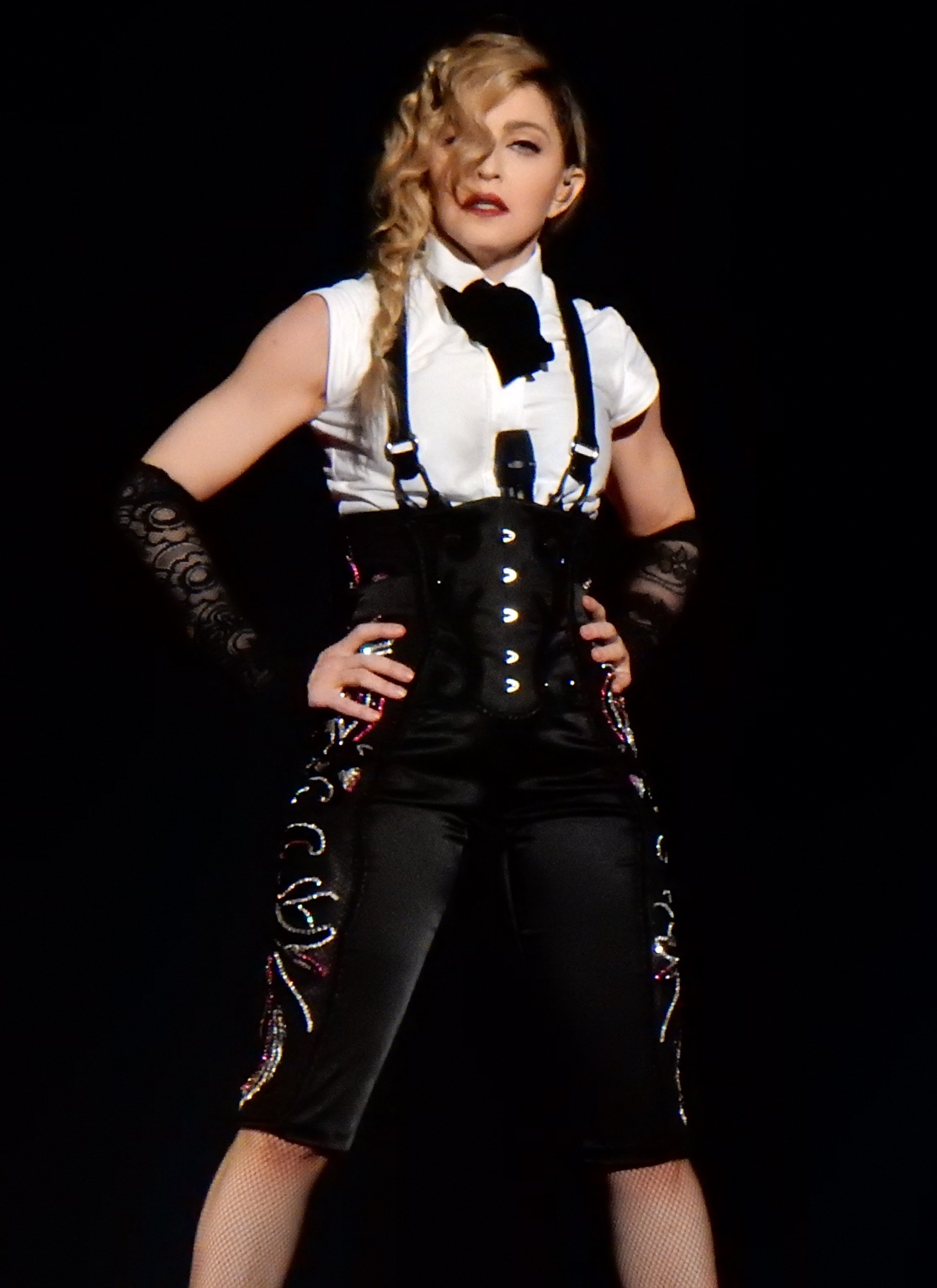
Madonna during the Rebel Heart Tour (2015–2016)

The Radio 1 Madonna controversy was a series of events that occurred as a result of BBC Radio 1's decision not to playlist American singer Madonna's single "Living for Love" in February 2015. Despite receiving moderate airplay from commercial radio in the United Kingdom, the single was not added to Radio 1's playlist, leading to accusations of ageism. The controversy stemmed from an article in the Daily Mail, which quoted an unnamed Radio 1 insider describing Madonna as "old" and "irrelevant". In response, the singer's fans posted numerous requests for the song on Radio 1's social media accounts, and several artists criticized Radio 1's music policy, prompting the station to release a statement defending their decision not to play the track.

The controversy received significant media coverage in the UK and internationally, sparking a wider discussion about ageism in the music industry. "Living for Love" was subsequently added to BBC Radio 2's C-list, before being promoted to the B-list. The station targets audiences aged 35 and higher. Commercially, the single peaked at number 26 on the UK Singles Chart for the week ending 28 February 2015.

Across the following decade, Madonna would continue to have moderate chart success, including a top 10 song in 2023 with "Popular". In 2026, Madonna returned as a lead artist to Radio 1's A-list with "Bring Your Love".

== Background ==
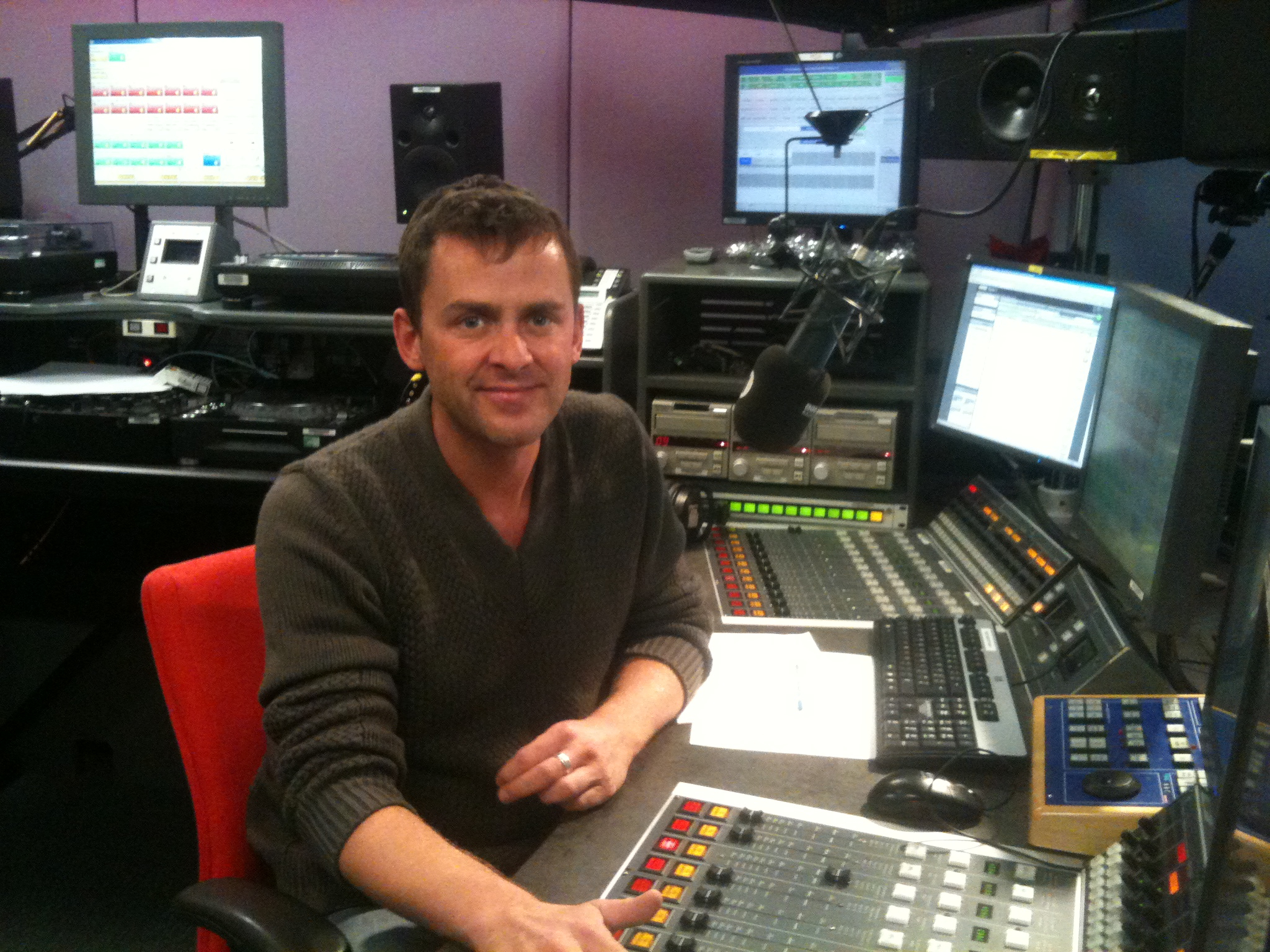
Radio 1's Scott Mills: "I don't think we play Madonna anymore".

Madonna has received considerable airplay on BBC Radio 1 since the beginning of her career and made her first appearance on the station on 22 December 1986, when she was interviewed by Simon Bates during the promotion of the film Shanghai Surprise. The singer gave subsequent interviews to Jakki Brambles, Bates, Simon Mayo, Mark Goodier, Sara Cox, Jo Whiley, and Chris Moyles in 1990, 1991, 1994, 1998, 2000, 2001, and 2006, respectively. The station also broadcast the Blond Ambition World Tour in 1990 and The Girlie Show in 1993. On 10 May 2008, Madonna headlined BBC Radio 1's Big Weekend at Mote Park, in Maidstone to promote the release of her album Hard Candy. The first single from the album, "4 Minutes" (2008), was added to the station's A-list.

In 2012, Madonna released her twelfth studio album, MDNA. The lead single, "Give Me All Your Luvin'", and subsequent releases from the album were not added to the Radio 1 playlist, despite the former featuring rappers Nicki Minaj and M.I.A., two artists who receive regular rotation on the station. Radio 1 DJ Scott Mills defended their decision not to play Madonna saying, "I don't think we play Madonna any more. There is a lot of research, and if you ask a 17-year-old about her, they go 'don't care' [...] it's a sign of the times, things change, it's a generational thing. I like Madonna, does a 17-year-old? [She's] probably not at the top of their list. And that's horrible, but that is the way it is [...] and also youth audiences are so fickle in what they like and what they don't like, and they're quite opinionated, you just have got to keep on top of that."

Speaking at a Radio Academy event in 2014, the station's Head of Music, George Ergatoudis, stated that its audience had "moved on" from Madonna, and that the majority of her fans were "over 30". He added that the BBC Trust had decided to make Radio 1 as a station appealing to a younger demographic, a factor which determines their daytime playlists.

== Events ==
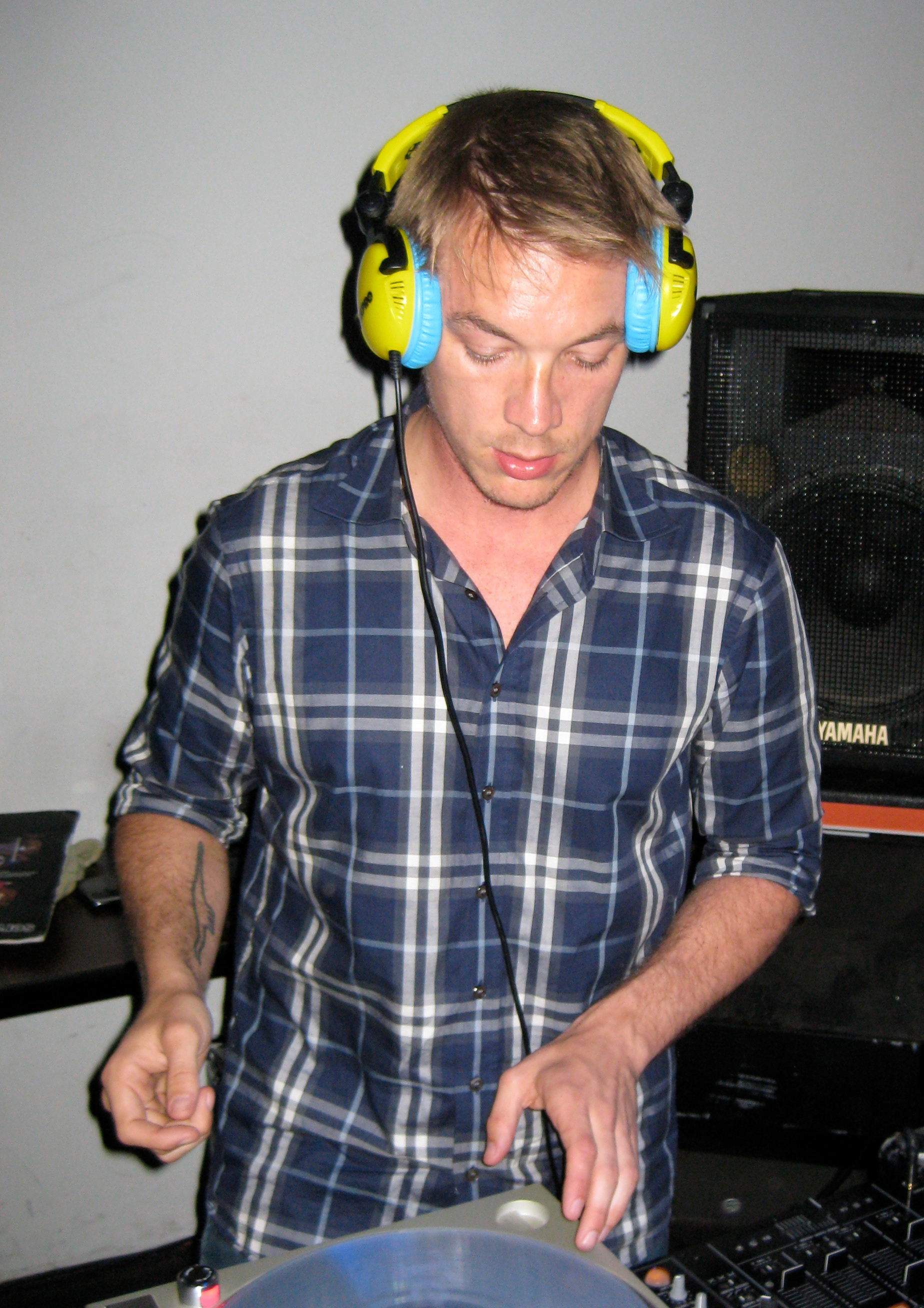
"Living for Love" was produced by Diplo, who hosts a weekly show on Radio 1.

On 20 December 2014, Madonna's thirteenth studio album Rebel Heart became available for pre-order. Unlike other countries, first single "Living for Love" was only made available for pre-order in the United Kingdom, and was not chart-eligible until 25 February 2015. On 22 December 2014, "Living for Love" started to receive airplay on commercial radio, most notably Capital FM, where the song was eventually added to the station's playlist.

On 9 January 2015, Annie Mac played "Living for Love" on Radio 1 during her evening dance show. In a later interview with The Independent, Mac said that her mission was to "represent the landscape of new music honestly", and hoped that older artists such as Madonna should not get excluded from the station. "I'm a lifelong Madonna fan and I played her on my Friday show. [...] If I'm excited by a song, then I think it's going to be all right to play it", Mac concluded.

An article published by the Daily Mail on 14 February 2015 quoted an unnamed BBC Radio 1 insider who stated that "Living for Love" would not be played on the station because Madonna is "irrelevant" and "old". Radio 1 later denied the claims on their Facebook page, stating that the station "does not ban anyone". One of its representatives explained that tracks are chosen on "musical merit" and that an artist's age is never a factor when choosing songs for their playlist.

== Reception ==
The Daily Mail article quickly went viral, and hundreds of messages were left on Radio 1's Facebook page from Madonna's fans urging the station to play "Living for Love". Support for the singer soon spread to the station's Twitter and Instagram accounts, with fans posting links to the "Living for Love" video, her performance at the 57th Annual Grammy Awards, and posts claiming that the BBC was being discriminatory.

Madonna received support from artists such as Boy George, Elly Jackson, Diplo and Rita Ora. Shirley Manson wrote on her Twitter account that Madonna should "contemplate suing Radio 1 for discrimination in the workplace", and that the station's music policy was "bordering on, if not actively, unlawful".

Madonna posted a newspaper clipping that featured the story on her Twitter and Instagram accounts, and thanked her fans for their support. She also recalled discussing the incident with her manager Guy Oseary and admitted that it was perplexing for her to learn that artists in their fifties do not get played on radio, without exceptions. "We've made so many advances in other areas — civil rights, gay rights — but ageism is still an area that's taboo and not talked about and dealt with," she concluded.

== BBC rebuttal and aftermath ==
The BBC was quick to refute allegations of ageism, and explained that songs were chosen on a case-by-case basis for inclusion on their weekly playlist. Their representative noted that Paul McCartney had two songs on the playlist, although critics pointed out that both of these tracks were collaborations with younger artists (McCartney featured on "Only One", with Kanye West, and "FourFiveSeconds", with Rihanna). The station further listed David Guetta, the Foo Fighters, and Sia as examples of older artists making their playlist. In an interview with The Daily Telegraph, Radio 1's controller Ben Cooper explained that the station has not banned Madonna, and that a group of twelve personnel aged 16–24 would meet on a regular basis to review the network's musical output, determining the relevant musical choice for their demographic.

In an interview with the Daily Mirror, Mills defended the station's decision not to play the song. He stated, "[Radio 1 are] trying to get the average age of the listener down and, to be honest, most Madonna fans are in their 30s and 40s. I don't actually mind the new single, but do I think Radio 1 should play it? Probably not." According to the Official Charts Company, "Living for Love" moved towards the top-twenty of the UK Singles Chart with two days of available sales as reported in their mid-week chart report. It ultimately debuted at number 26 on the chart with sales of 17,936 copies, becoming Madonna's 71st top-forty single, extending her record as the female artist with the most top-forty UK singles. Madonna would continue to debut songs on the chart, including "Medellín" at 87 in 2019, "Vulgar" with Sam Smith at 69 and "Popular" at 10 in 2023. The latter became Madonna's highest-peaking single in the UK since "Celebration" reached number three in 2009 and her 64th top-ten hit across four non-consecutive decades. This extended Madonna's record for the female artist with the most top-ten songs on the chart.

In March 2026, over 40 years after its initial release, the song "Into the Groove" experienced a significant resurgence on streaming platforms following a viral social media trend initiated by online influencer Gymskin. This led to the song re-entering the official UK singles chart at number 40, its first appearance in the top 40 since 1985. The following week, the song re-entered the top 20 at number 18, becoming Madonna's first solo entry in the UK top 20 since "Celebration" reached number three in 2009. The song also re-entered the Irish charts, at number 24.

In April 2026, eleven years after the incident, it was confirmed that Madonna's music would return to BBC Radio 1's A-list, with the release of Madonna's lead single for her fifteenth album Confessions II, "Bring Your Love" featuring American performer Sabrina Carpenter. "Bring Your Love" debuted at number 29 on the UK Singles Chart, earning 13,557 sales in its first week. The track became Madonna's 72nd top-forty entry on the chart. Ultimately, the song debuted at number one on the UK Airplay Chart, with 52.11 million audience impressions and 3,531 radio spins during its first week.

== See also ==
- BBC controversies
- "Real Love", a Beatles song that received similar treatment in 1996
- "Candy", a Robbie Williams song that received similar treatment in 2012
- "Padam Padam", a Kylie Minogue song given similar treatment in 2023
