= Living for Love =

Single by Madonna

from the album Rebel Heart
- Released: December 20, 2014
- Recorded: 2014
- Genre: EDM; diva house; disco; electropop
- Length: 3:38
- Label: Interscope
- Songwriters: Madonna Ciccone; Thomas Wesley Pentz; Maureen McDonald; Toby Gad; Ariel Rechtshaid
- Producers: Madonna; Diplo; Ariel Rechtshaid

Madonna singles chronology
"Turn Up the Radio" (2012)	"Living for Love" (2014)	"Ghosttown" (2015)

Music video
- "Living for Love" on YouTube

"Living for Love" is a song recorded by American singer Madonna for her thirteenth studio album, Rebel Heart (2015). It was written and produced by Madonna, Diplo and Ariel Rechtshaid, with additional writing from MoZella and Toby Gad. Originally intended for a Valentine's Day 2015 release, the song was rush-released as the lead single from the album on December 20, 2014, by Interscope Records, after demos recorded for the album leaked on to the internet. An EDM, diva house, disco and electropop track on which Madonna experimented with different musical genres, "Living for Love" contains instrumentation from percussion and piano by singer Alicia Keys, along with a gospel choir. Madonna composed the track as a break-up song, however she wanted to deviate and make the lyrics as uplifting in nature, talking about counteracting negative thoughts with positive responses.

"Living for Love" received positive reviews from critics, who praised its rhythm and lyrics, comparing it to her earlier works. They also considered the song a step-up from her last two lead singles. In the United States, it failed to enter the Billboard Hot 100, but became Madonna's 44th number-one hit on the Dance Club Songs chart, tying her with country singer George Strait as the act with most number-one singles on any Billboard chart. Although United Kingdom's BBC Radio 1 decided not to play it, the song entered the UK Singles Chart at number 26, becoming Madonna's 71st top-forty single, extending her record as the female artist with the most top-forty UK singles. "Living for Love" also reached the top-twenty of the charts in Finland, Hungary, Israel, Japan, Lebanon, and Scotland as well as the top 30 in Italy and Spain.

An accompanying music video was directed by the French duo Julien Choquart and Camille Hirigoyen, together known as J.A.C.K., and was released in February 2015. The storyline incorporates mythological elements and shows Madonna as a matador, fighting her dancers dressed like minotaurs in a red circular stage. It had numerous costume changes, and was critically appreciated for its empowering theme and transcending gender roles. Madonna first performed the song in a similar matador theme at the 57th Annual Grammy Awards; it became the most-watched moment of the night. The second performance was at the 2015 Brit Awards, which made headlines due to the singer's wardrobe malfunction causing her to be pulled down a flight of stairs that made up part of the stage. Alternate versions of "Living for Love" were performed on Le Grand Journal, The Ellen DeGeneres Show, and on Madonna's 2015–2016 Rebel Heart Tour.

== Writing and development ==
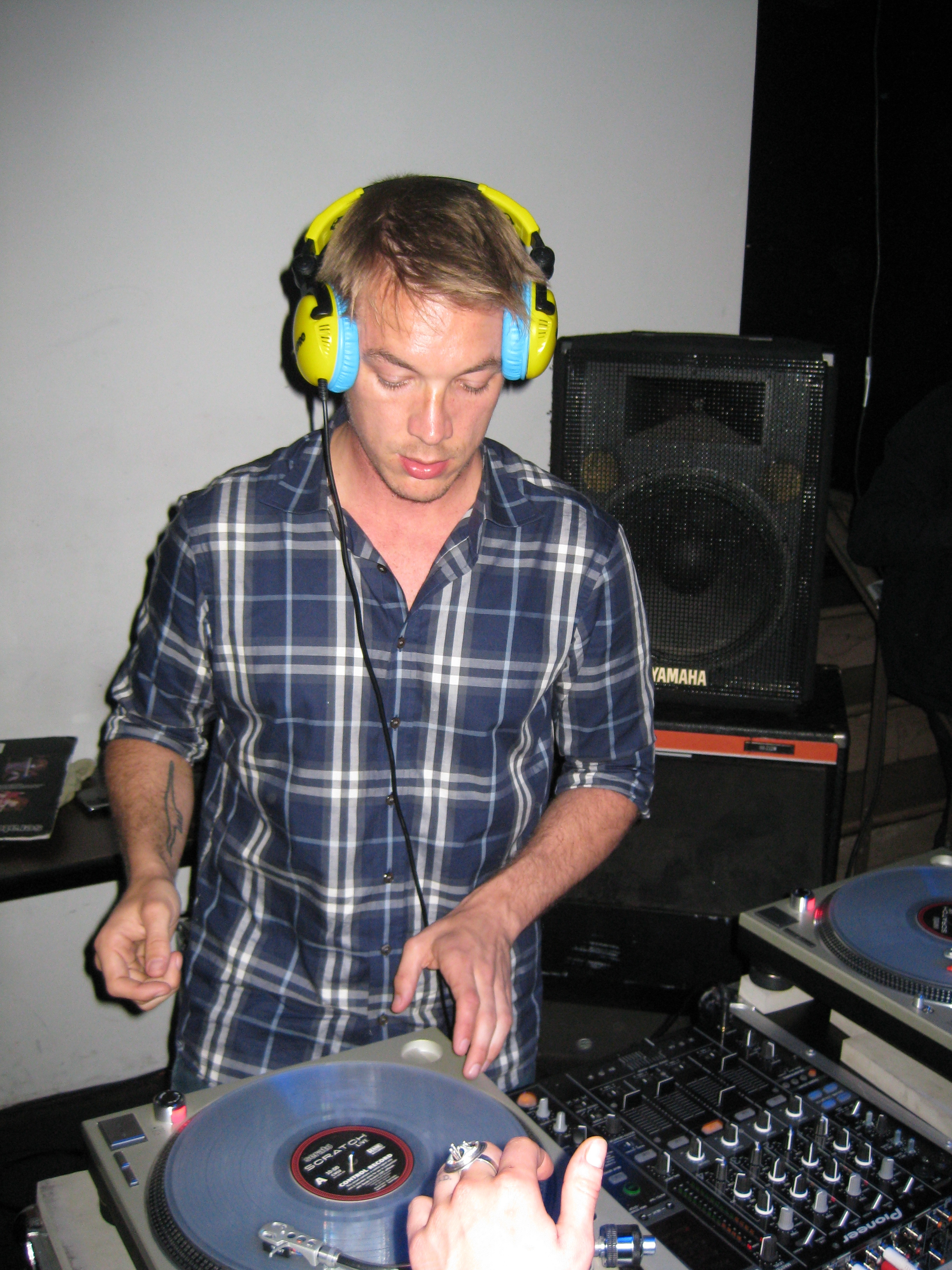
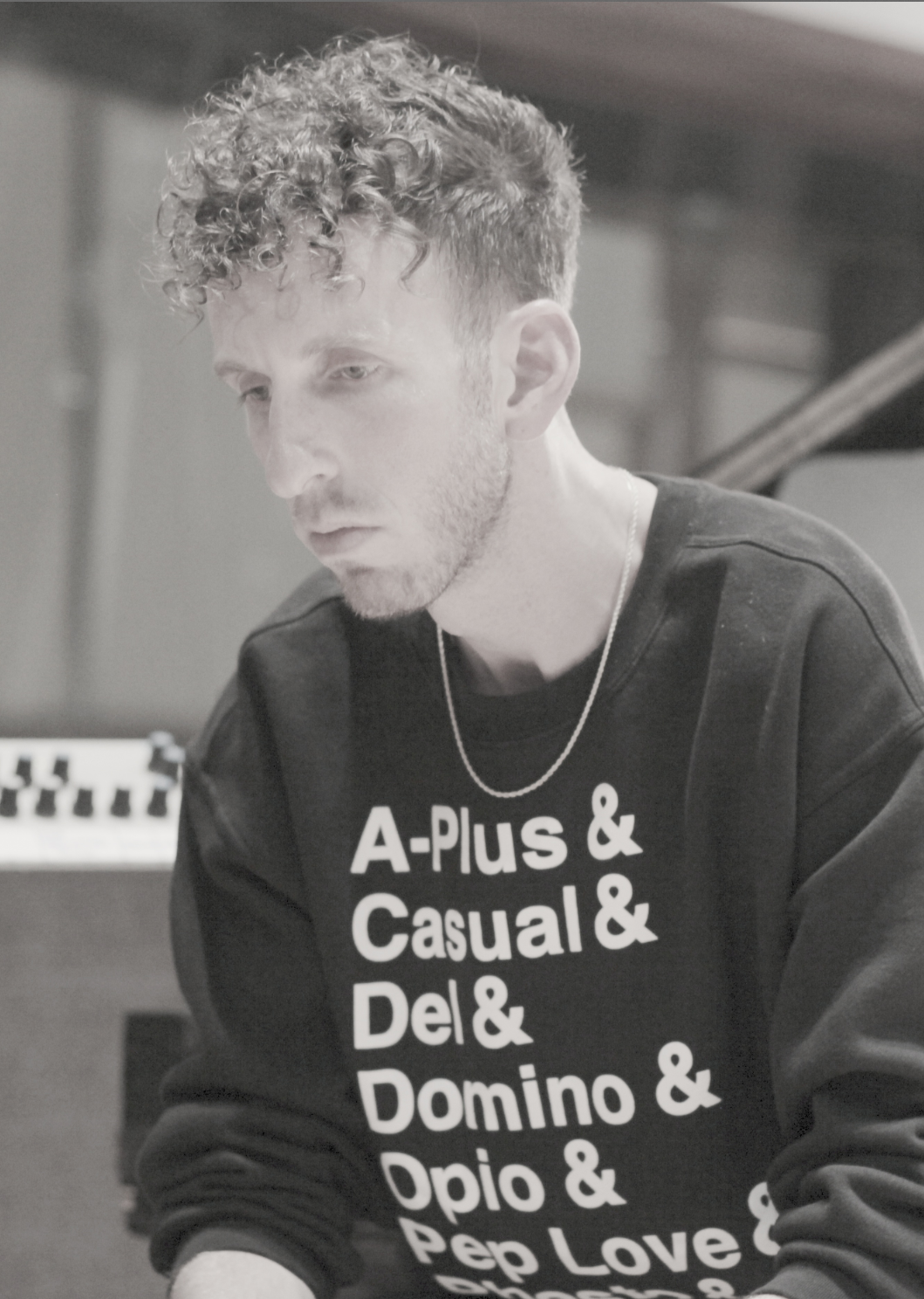
Diplo (left) and Ariel Rechtshaid co-wrote and co-produced "Living for Love" with Madonna.

"Living for Love" was written and produced by Madonna, Diplo and Ariel Rechtshaid, with additional writing from MoZella and Toby Gad. Madonna's collaboration with Diplo was revealed in May 2014 through an image on her Instagram showing her working on her laptop with him. She had invited him for her annual Oscar party, and he could not make it. So he began texting with her about music and sent some music. Madonna replied with a 20-page text containing her anecdotes on the music. Following this they started collaborating for the album. In an interview with Idolator, Diplo explained that Madonna had asked him to provide his "craziest record" for the album. Together they wrote and recorded seven songs and Diplo added that "Those records are gonna be crazy-sounding. We really pushed the envelope with some of the stuff we were doing... [S]he was up for anything. I love when an artist gives a producer the confidence he needs to work with them, and Madonna was very open-minded to my ideas... she was down from day one." According to Diplo, "Living for Love" had almost 20 versions ranging from a piano ballad to an EDM composition, ultimately Madonna and Diplo compromising on a middle level. Rechtshaid and British singer MNEK also joined for writing sessions with them, improving the verse of the song. Madonna denied that there were 20 versions of the song, admitting it "might be a little too high", and commented on how she wanted it to sound:

We knew we wanted to make a dance record. But you know, there's so many different levels of dance music and even different categories of house music. So, it was really like, what's the bass line gonna sound like? Is it gonna be really stripped down and sparse, or is it going to be loaded up? Is it gonna be Chicago house? Is it gonna be U.K. house? It's like, all over the place. Is it gonna be a little bit of one vocal line? Is it gonna be a whole choir singing? So we were experimenting and trying out different things. They all sounded good, but at the end of the day, we wanted it to sound timeless, also. Not just something of the moment.

In October 2014, American singer Alicia Keys confirmed that she worked on Madonna's upcoming studio album, saying "It was good. I was in here doing a meeting or something and [Madonna] was working with Diplo. They were like, 'Oh, maybe you can play some piano on this thing'. And I was like, 'Alright. I'll try. If you hate it, you can take it off'. It was just like that, casual and cool." Annie from the London Community Gospel Choir provided the female background vocals throughout the song. Madonna also mentioned that new versions would be "coming out, but just not yet". Describing the song as "one of [Diplo's] more mellow productions", Madonna composed "Living for Love" as a break-up song, commenting, "lots of people write about being in love and being happy or they write about having a broken heart and being inconsolable. But nobody writes about having a broken heart and being hopeful and triumphant afterwards. So I thought, how can I do this? I didn't want to share the sentiment of being a victim. This scenario devastated me, but it just made me stronger". She complemented saying that "Living for Love" was "kind of like the old me and the new me all mixed in together".

== Release ==
The demo version of "Living for Love" leaked onto the Internet in December 2014, alongside the other twelve demo recordings for Madonna's then untitled thirteenth studio album. On December 20, 2014, the album's title was confirmed to be Rebel Heart and became available for pre-order on iTunes along with six tracks, including "Living for Love" as the album's lead single. Madonna stated that the songs were meant to be "an early Christmas gift". Originally, "Living for Love" was intended to be released on Valentine's Day 2015, with the rest of the record slated for a spring release. However, due to the leak of materials, the release date had to be pushed up. She went on to say she would prefer her fans hear the completed versions of some of the songs instead of the incomplete tracks that were circulating.

Gordon Murray from Billboard reported that two versions of the song were sent to US club DJs on December 21, 2014: the original version and the instrumental. Interscope sent the song as a "soft sell" on December 22 to radio outlets, and it failed to receive airplay at the Top 40 formats, garnering a total of 10 plays due to the rushed out release and being on a Christmas week, when most programmers were on vacation. The label decided to re-service it to radio after 2015 started, with an official adds date to Top 40/Mainstream radio stations on February 10. "Living for Love" was commercially released on February 25 in the United Kingdom. A number of remixes were released for streaming, namely those by Djemba Djemba, Offer Nissim, Mike Rizzo and Drew G.

== Recording and composition ==
"Living for Love" is an EDM, diva house, disco and electropop song which starts as Madonna sings over a "regal" piano line which is eventually joined by percussion. The song is set in the simple time signature of 4/4, with a tempo of 123 beats per minute. It is composed in the key of F minor, with Madonna's vocals spanning the range from E♭_{3} to C_{5}. "Living for Love" has a I–IV–V–I sequence as its chord progression, with the rhythm flowing as Fm–Cm–D♭–A♭–E♭/A♭. The song was engineered by Demacio "Demo" Castellon and Nick Rowe, while the former also mixed it. Angie Teo did the additional recording and mixing of the track, with Ann Mincieli. Along with The London Community Gospel Choir, MNEK and Santell also provided backing vocals on the track, while Keys and Gad acted as additional musicians. Dean Piper from The Daily Telegraph explained that "Living for Love" has "some classic Madonna traits: religious references, a gospel choir, 1990s piano beats and a whirling bass", and was compared to her 1989 singles, "Like a Prayer" and "Express Yourself", by Jason Lipshutz from Billboard. Keys' piano tracks are played along with the electronic music, up to the chorus.

Unlike Madonna's previous two lead singles, "4 Minutes" (2008) and "Give Me All Your Luvin'" (2012), "Living for Love" puts the emphasis on the lyrics and vocals, with the lines on the bridge going like "Took me to heaven, let me fall down/Now that it's over, I'm gonna carry on" and a "throbbing drop" in the middle. Sal Cinquemani from Slant Magazine described the song as Kiesza meets "Like a Prayer", and noted that there were many changes from the leaked demo version: the throwback house music being replaced by an 808 pulse sound and Keys' piano, as well as handclaps and gospel riffing being removed towards the end of the song. For Jon Lisi from PopMatters, "Living for Love" fitted with contemporary pop music releases and the DIY ethic they displayed, starting from Taylor Swift's "Shake It Off", to Ariana Grande's "Break Free" and Katy Perry's "Roar". The survivor anthem-like nature of the track was evocative of Madonna's survival in her music career. With NRJ the singer herself explained the meaning behind the lyrics: "It's a song having your heart broken but it's about saying you know what I'm going to my life goes on, I will carry on, I won't stop believing in love, I'll pick up my crown, put it back on my head and I will walk through life proudly believing that love, true love does exist."

== Critical reception ==
Following its release, "Living for Love" earned critical praise. Lipshutz was appreciative of the song, commending Madonna's "confident" vocal delivery. He said that the song sounded "like a giddy combination of Madonna's past and present, and represents an encouraging sign for a 2015 project that was unexpectedly thrown into jeopardy at the end of 2014." Stern compared the song to Madonna's 1992 single "Deeper and Deeper", noting that unlike the UK dance acts and the teen-pop groups paying homage to 1990s house music, Madonna had lived through that era. Calling the song a "total beast of a collaborative effort", and ended his review saying "Fuck singing about Tanqueray in the club: This is the Madonna we've always known and lived to love, with flares of the future and nostalgic nods to the past." Time's Jamieson Cox observed that "Living for Love" was tailor-made for radio, with the increase in popularity of house music and the crossover success of British house musicians.

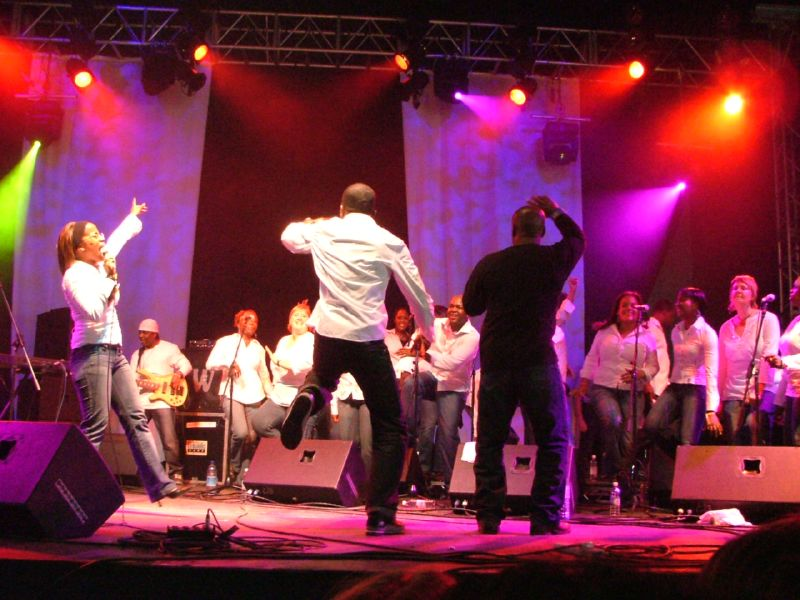
Usage of the London Community Gospel Choir in the song was received positively by critics.

Writing for USA Today, Brian Mansfield complimented the optimistic and "self-assured" nature of the song, adding that "it's the sort of determined dance anthem Madonna does so well". The Dallas Morning News' Hunter Hauk described the song as a "solid melding" of different club musics and appreciated the dance break, and Madonna's singing attitude, calling it "less prickly or defiant than we see on Instagram these days". Jeff Miers from The Buffalo News compared "Living for Love" to earlier club anthems, songs which had become commercial success for Madonna. Writing for i-D, Nick Levine described the song as a "perfectly-pitched comeback single: rather than returning with a cheap EDM banger... When she sings 'I picked up my crown, put it back on my head', it feels like a statement of intent." Lewis Corner from Digital Spy listed it as one of the top ten tracks of the week, adding that the composition made it "a euphoric first cut from [...] Rebel Heart". Jed Gottlieb from Boston Herald described the track's beats as contemporary, while found the chorus and the hooks to be reminiscent of "old school" Top 40 songs. "True Blue fans will hear a joy and nostalgia in [the song]". Jon Pareles from The New York Times commended "Living for Love"'s ability to transform "the breakup emotions into an uplifting redemption". He called it "one of Madonna's best singles in a decade". Writing for PopMatters, Lisi found the track to be Madonna's "most joyous" release since "Express Yourself".

Daryl Deino from The Inquisitr praised the song for being "epic and uplifting", believing that it would open up Madonna's music to a new generation. Jim Farber of New York Daily News found the song to be a return to form for the singer, describing it as "prime mix of club and pop music, with an old-school R&B piano, soaring backup vocals and a melody that keeps lifting you higher." Zel McCarthy from Vice believed that the song reflected the personalities of its songwriters, feeling that the production and the personable lyrics made it a success. Bernard Zuel from The Sydney Morning Herald believed that "Living for Love" embodied every aspect of Madonna's life, a mixture of her past, present and future. This view was shared by Lindsay Zoladz from New York, who had criticized the other five songs from the album, but called "Living for Love" as "an unexpectedly perfect balance between the ghosts of Madge past and future". Dean Piper from The Daily Telegraph called it the "most original" among the songs released, however he was critical of the lyrics saying that they failed "to penetrate your soul". Cinquemani complemented the changes in the song from the demo version, calling it Madonna's "most rousing lead single in years", but lamented the nasal vocals of the singer. Michael Jose Gonzalez from Danish music magazine, Gaffa, found the song to be melodic but reminiscent of the music from Madonna's tenth studio album, Confessions on a Dance Floor (2005).

At their year-end ranking of the Top 25 Singles of 2015, Slant Magazine listed "Living for Love" at number 25, saying "Overworked and overthought, for sure, but the song's essence remains in tact [sic], and if Madonna's message of life after love didn't register as a commercial comeback on the scale of, say, Cher's 'Believe', it remains a pop-gospel sequel of the highest order." While ranking Madonna's singles, in honor of her 60th birthday, The Guardian's Jude Rogers placed "Living for Love" at number 23, writing that its "pulsing house piano, gospel vocals and boxfresh Diplo production sound fantastic". Chuck Arnold from Entertainment Weekly called it a "righteous return to form" for Madonna, comparing it to Gloria Gaynor's 1978 hit "I Will Survive". He listed "Living for Love" as the singer's 53rd best single. In August 2018, Slant Magazine's Ed Gonzalez placed "Living for Love" at number 56 of his ranking of the singer's singles, calling it a "straight shot of electro-fried love-as-religion theater that sounds too much like a remix of a true original for it to ever cast a lasting spell, nostalgic or otherwise".

== Chart performance ==
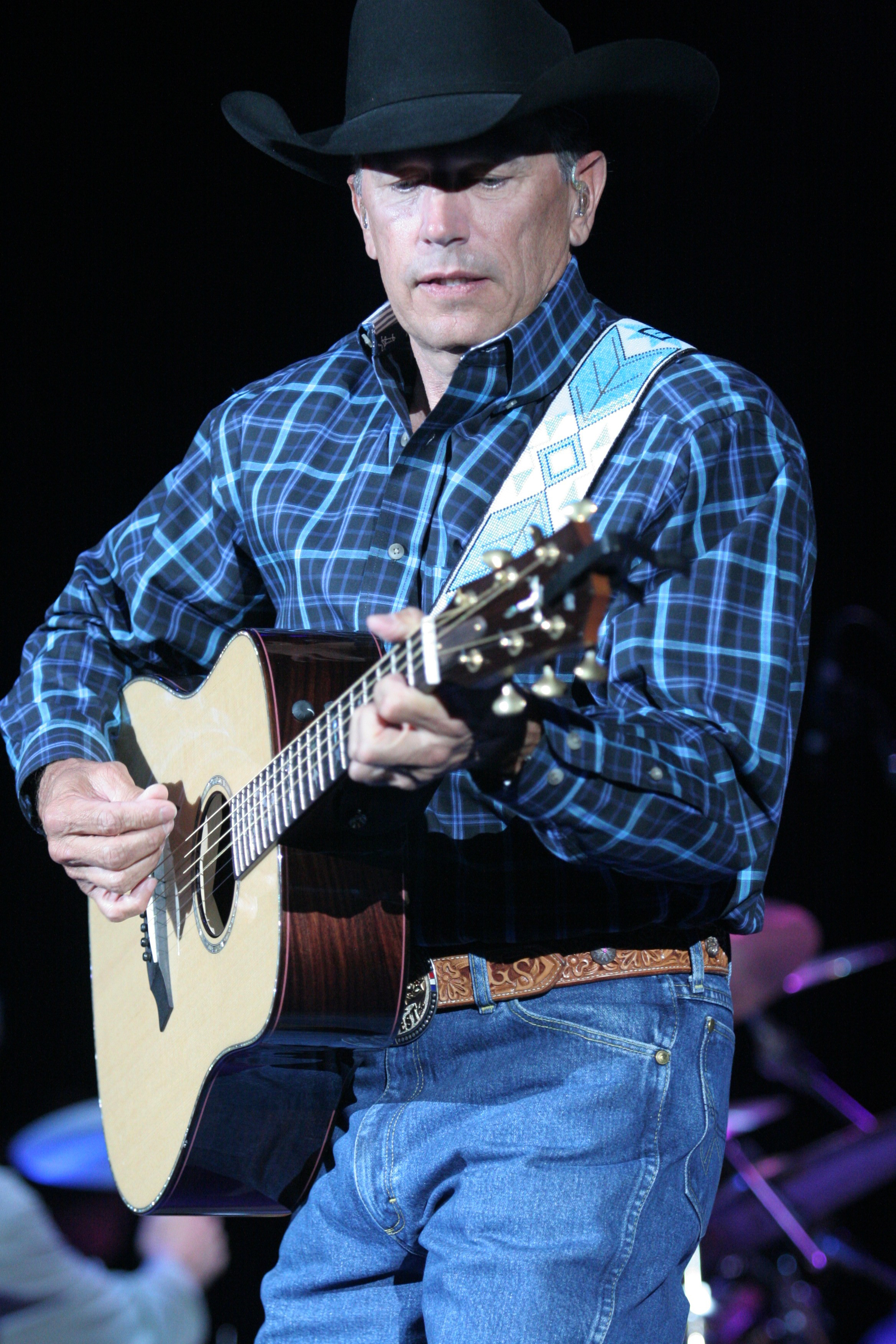
Madonna tied country singer George Strait, as the artists with most number-one songs on a Billboard chart with "Living for Love", which became her 44th number-one on the Dance Club Songs chart.

Following the pre-order release of Rebel Heart, "Living for Love" entered the Dance/Electronic Songs chart at number 16 and the Dance/Electronic Digital Songs chart at numbers 12, with 10,000 digital downloads. The next week, "Living for Love" moved to number 13 on the Dance/Electronic Songs chart, with further sales of 11,000 copies, and has since peaked at number 9, thereby becoming the singer's first top-ten single on the chart. It achieved 587,000 streams after the music video premiere and further sales of 17,000 copies, becoming the greatest gainer on the Dance/Electronic Digital Songs chart. In January 2015, "Living for Love" debuted at number 32 on the Dance Club Songs chart, making it the singer's first appearance since her previous single "Turn Up the Radio". It then climbed to number 18 and the following week to number 11 as the greatest gainer on the chart for both weeks.

For the issue dated March 7, 2015, "Living for Love" became Madonna's 44th number-one song on the chart. She equaled George Strait—who collected 44 chart-toppers on the Hot Country Songs—as the act with most number-one singles on any Billboard chart. "Living for Love" did not enter the Billboard Hot 100 but debuted at number 8 on the Bubbling Under Hot 100 Singles chart. It became Madonna's 29th entry in the Pop Songs chart, debuting at number 36 on February 24, 2015. Billboard reported that the debut was due to an increased radio spins from iHeartMedia stations. It also debuted at number 35 on Dance/Mix Show Airplay chart. Madonna became the oldest female artist to enter the Pop Songs chart, since Carly Simon, who reached number 20 as the featured artist on Janet Jackson's 2002 single, "Son of a Gun (I Betcha Think This Song Is About You)".

Across Europe, the song debuted at number 50 in France, number 12 in Hungary and number 21 in Spain, alongside the other tracks from Rebel Heart. In Japan, the song debuted at number 80 on the Japan Hot 100 for the week ending January 12, 2015, climbing to number 26 the following week. In Spain it debuted at number 21 on the Spanish Singles Chart; after the release of the remixes, they charted separately on the albums chart at number 93.

In the United Kingdom, BBC Radio 1 decided not to play Madonna's single as their playlist committee did not think the track was good enough for heavy airplay. According to their head of music, George Ergatoudis, Madonna's fans were older than station's target demographic. The station was criticized by the singer as well as musicians Diplo and Boy George for promoting age discrimination. Representatives from Radio 1 said that the songs listed on their playlists were not chosen on the basis of an artist's age but on quality. "Living for Love" was later added to the playlist of BBC Radio 2, which caters to audiences aged 35 and more. According to the Official Charts Company, the track moved towards the top-twenty of the UK Singles Chart with two days of available sales as reported in their mid-week chart report. It ultimately debuted at number 26 on the chart with sales of 17,936 copies, becoming Madonna's 71st top-forty single, and extending her record as the female artist with the most top-forty UK singles.

== Music video ==
=== Development ===
In December 2014, Madonna's manager Guy Oseary announced that a music video was scheduled to be released in early February 2015. The video was directed by the French duo Julien Choquart and Camille Hirigoyen, together known as J.A.C.K. It was edited by Danny B. Tull, styled by B. Akerlund and choreographed by Megan Lawson. According to Madonna, she wanted to have a cinematic and storytelling aspect with the video adding that:

The thing about that song, it's such a passionate song. I had to present it in a passionate way, and I used mythology to tell the story, with the story of the Minotaur, the matador, fighting for love. And the color red. And flowers. Horns, and death. And naked men. You know, the important things in life. I don't want to make every video the same. But I did love the richness of that video. To me it felt like a painting that came to life. That's what I was trying to do.

Verena Dietzel, creator of the fashion label V-Couture, who specializes in different kinds of corsets, were enlisted to create clothing for the video, as well as a Grammy Awards performance. Dietzel explained that she had initially thought Madonna's e-mail as spam, however after confirmation from the singer's assistant stylist, B. Åkerlund, she started working on the designs. Within 48 hours she sewed a new corset, as well as created two new ones, by basing them on the only information provided to her, that of Madonna's bra-size. She had to search on Google for deducing the rest of the singer's proportions. In total four different corsets were shipped off to Madonna. Lebanese designer Shady Zeineldine was also contacted by Åkerlund, who visited the designer's press conference in Los Angeles, and asked him to send his ideas and sketches for the video. After the deal was finalized, he created a custom made matador jacket which Madonna wore in the video. Another dress was a bodysuit, featuring a nude satin-stretch corset covered in three different types of lace, a black chiffon silk top and a satin tie. There was also a red velvet bolero jacket.

The corset was described by Steff Yotka from Style.com as "masculine-feminine mix... it's the sort of tight, sexy, gender-bending thing we've come to expect from [Madonna]". The singer and her team had sent matador references to Zeineldine, who wanted to give a feminine touch to the designs, utilizing numerous laces and nude color palette to highlight the singer's body curves. Amber Kallor from Style.com explained that Madonna's make-up in the video was inspired by recent runway shows of Christian Dior and Givenchy. The singer had applied parallel eye liner with her bolero jacket look, as well as sported bobby pin and Princess Leia like buns on her hair. Designer Riccardo Tisci approved of the Minotaur costumes used by the dancers, which used crystal masks designed by Marianna Harutunian and leather horns. He also gave his approval of the gemstones applied on the singer's face for one sequence in the video.

=== Release and synopsis ===
Madonna in the music video for the song. She is dressed in the nude corset created by Shady Zeineldine. The shot portrays her onstage being surrounded by the dancers as Minotaurs.

The music video was released on picture messaging application Snapchat on February 5, 2015, where it was available for viewing on the application's "Snap Channel" platform. Madonna became the first artist to premiere her video on Snapchat. The video was deleted after 24 hours, in lieu of Snapchat's self-destructing ethos, and was later uploaded on Madonna's Vevo channel. Sara Spary from Marketing Week commended the decision, believing it to be "a major move for Snapchat and the decision by Madonna's label could pave the way for other label giants to host content on the app as well as other branded content."

The video begins with a focus light on Madonna's hand which gradually reveals a circular red stage surrounded by red curtains. Madonna, wearing the red velvet jacket moves around the stage throwing off a cape and does choreographed dance moves. Interspersed are visuals of a male dancer as a Minotaur wearing the horned mask, dancing on the ground and Madonna in the matador dress. She entices the male dancer with the cape as the chorus ends. A flock of male dancers wearing similar horned mask appear and surround Madonna around the stage.

Throughout the second verse Madonna chase the dancers and defeat them in mock fight. One of them pick her up and together they perform a second choreography atop the stage. Madonna is also shown in the bejeweled corset flapping around a red cape. For the final verses and chorus, Madonna in the nude corset dances among the Minotaurs, and ultimately slays them all. The last visual shows the singer standing among the slain bodies of the Minotaurs, throwing off the cape while holding a pair of horns in her left hand. Red roses fall around her and sound of applause is heard as a quote by German philosopher Friedrich Nietzsche flashes on screen, "Man is the cruelest animal. At tragedies, bullfights and crucifixions he has felt best on earth; and when he invented hell for himself that was his very heaven."

=== Reception and analysis ===
Hugh McIntyre from Forbes commended Madonna's decision to partner with Snapchat for the video release, because he considered it to be a profit for both parties. For Madonna it would enable her to connect with the younger audience, while for Snapchat, release of a new Madonna video would lead to an older demographic to download the app. Matthew Jacobs from The Huffington Post believed that the music video and its imagery matched with the uplifting nature of the song. He compared parts of the video with "Express Yourself" and "Hung Up", saying that Madonna emerging victorious among a flock of men dressed as bulls, evoked the leaks of Rebel Heart's songs. Recalling the self-referential undertones in the videos for "Give Me All Your Luvin'" and "Girl Gone Wild", Jacobs explained that "Madonna presents herself as queen of the big top without relying on allusions to her own résumé to prove she is the master of the postmodern pop scene... This is the Madonna video we've waited a decade for." The Houston Chronicle's Joey Guerra gave another positive review, saying "we haven't already learned time and again – never underestimate Madonna" and describing the video as a "nice fit" for the song. A writer for The Guardian described the video as a "straightforward performance clip" and believed that the simplistic nature of the video suggested that it was designed for being viewed on mobile devices.

Louis Virtel from HitFix called "Living for Love" as Madonna's "best video since 'Hung Up'". He found references to older Madonna videos, like "Express Yourself" in the "unusual choreography with all of its masculine posturing and grappling", "Take a Bow" with its bullfighting theme and playing on a familiar imagery from her career, and "Open Your Heart" during the sequences where Madonna fends off the Minotaur dancers. Virtel also commended the choreography, costumes, Madonna's looks and the cinematography of the video. Along with the "Take a Bow" reference, Billboard's Joe Lynch called the video as incredible and "lush, arresting" but criticized for the misspelling of Nietzsche at the end." Rita Kokshanian from InStyle said that the video was "just as good as you could have expected... And while we were completely transfixed by her killer moves and insane physique, we were equally in awe of her outfits."

Nathan Smith from Out found the video to be transcending gender roles, with Madonna assuming the role of a matador, a title generally reserved for a man. Also he noted that Madonna demonstrated her "toned and lean physique, demonstrating her unique and unparalleled mastery of the male species". For Alyssa Tomey from E!, Madonna "transforms into a fierce and sexy matador in the clip" and dances "her butt off with some seriously acrobatic moves". Jim Farber from New York Daily News found a contrast with the song's title and the "battlefield" like portrayal in the video, saying "While it's sonically exuberant, the song's lyrics reflect the aftermath of a hard-won battle." Rachel Pilcher from Yahoo! found the video to be strange, but believed that it was to be expected from Madonna.

== Live performances ==
Madonna first performed "Living for Love" at the 57th Annual Grammy Awards on February 8, 2015. She confirmed her appearance at the ceremony, by uploading an image of the Grammy trophy wrapped with black strings like the Internet memes for the cover art of Rebel Heart. The singer was dressed in a one-piece outfit in matador red, surrounded by male dancers as Minotaurs similar to the song's music video. It was developed by designer Riccardo Tisci for Givenchy and styled by Akerlund. The performance was described as a "beautiful story for why the matadors fight the bulls and that also reflects life". After being introduced by singers Miley Cyrus and Nicki Minaj, the performance began with images of Madonna on a kabuki screen talking about starting a revolution. She emerged from the screen and started singing, surrounded by the dancers. Near the end, the singer encouraged the audience to sing-along with her, finally being pulled atop the stage on a wire. Dina Gachman from Forbes reported that Madonna's performance was the most-watched moment of the night. Brittany Spanos from Rolling Stone described it as "the legendary singer was out for blood with her first live performance [of the song]". Shauna Murphy from MTV News observed Illuminati symbolism with the performance, including rituals, organized religion homage and a metaphor for death. MuuMuse's Bradley Stern listed it as the best performance of the Grammys, saying that "this is how a major pop performance should really look". Her effort to sing live without Auto-Tune during the choreographed performance was also heavily praised.

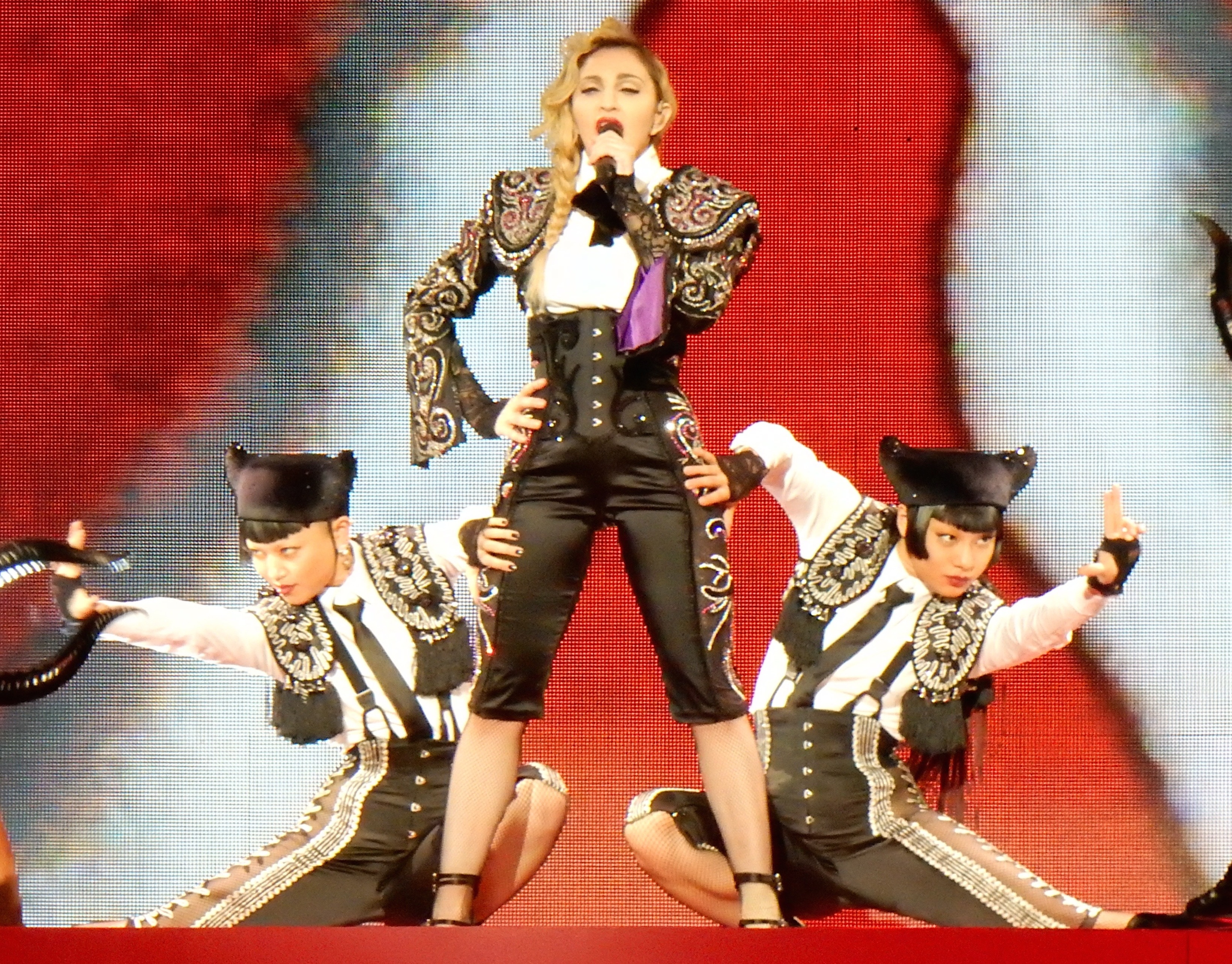
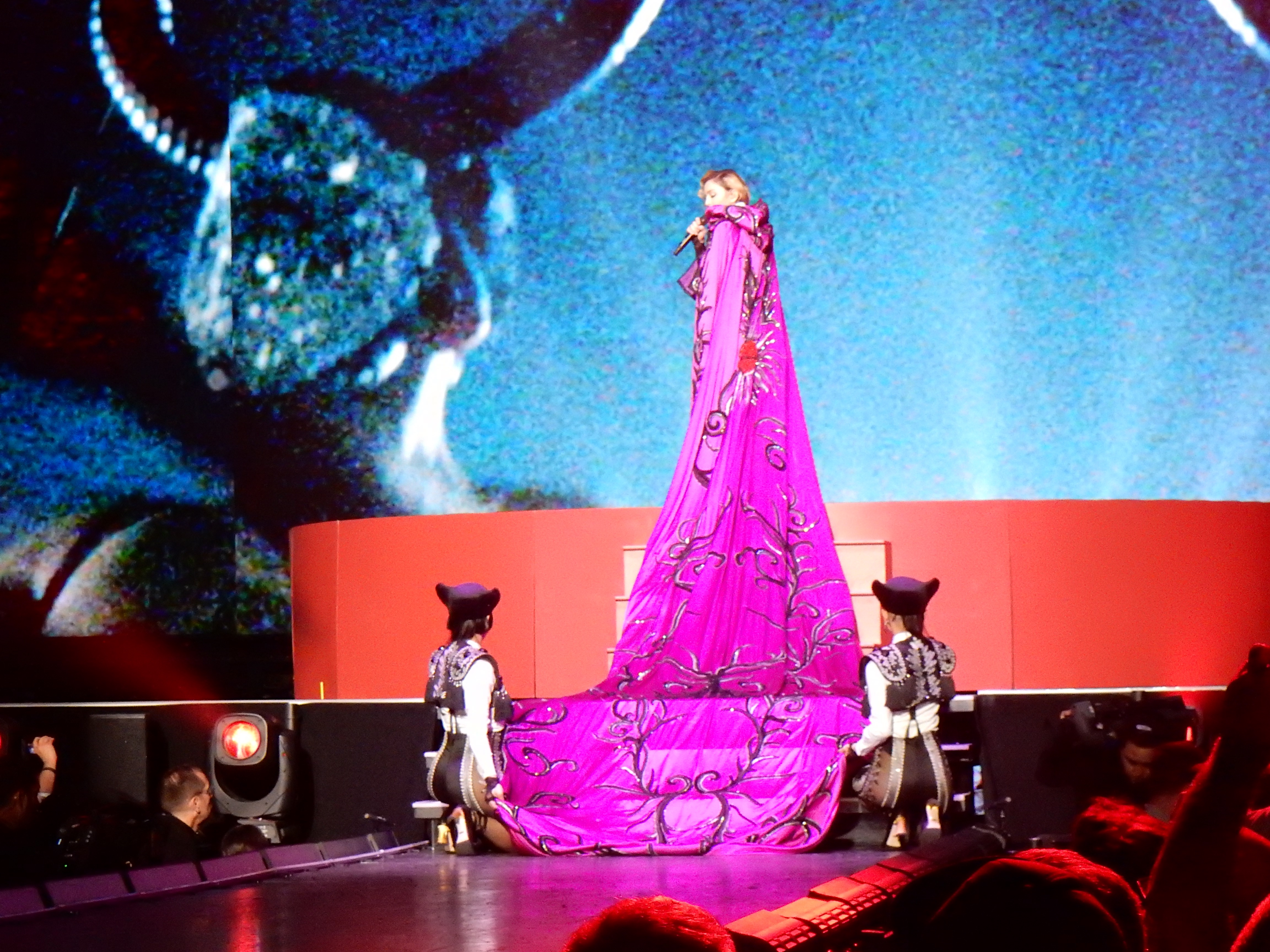
The performance of "Living for Love" during the Rebel Heart Tour (left); similar to the Brit Awards, Madonna wore a long cape at the beginning (right).

Madonna also performed the song at the 2015 Brit Awards, on February 25. However, in the early stages of the performance, a wardrobe malfunction caused her to be pulled down a flight of stairs that made up part of the stage. It was later revealed that since her cape was tied tightly, when her dancers attempted to remove it from her neck, she fell down to the floor. However Madonna then continued the performance as planned. She later took to Instagram to confirm that she was well, posting "Thanks for the good wishes! I'm fine". Richard Smirke from Billboard praised the performance and Madonna's recovery, saying that "[the singer] didn't let the fall affect her performance and quickly recovered to deliver a slickly choreographed routine that mirrored the matador theme of her recent Grammy Awards performance." Madonna explained on The Jonathan Ross Show that she was told to start walking towards the stage further than originally planned. Hence her team thought that the cape could have slid off and tied it tightly round her neck. The singer had two choices when the cape did not come undone, "I could either be strangled or fall, and I chose to fall". Madonna endured a whiplash and added that she "smacked the back of my head. And I had a man standing over me with a flashlight until about 3 am to make sure I was compos mentis". The singer jokingly added that she would not use any cape for further performances and attributed her prompt recovery to having good core strength and her daily exercise routine. The accident led to an increase in viewership of the awards show. According to the British Phonographic Industry, the event resulted a 95% increase in Twitter activity about the show compared with the previous year, with an exchange of 7.8 million tweets, while 6.8 million viewers tuned in to watch the performance. The singer's fall was voted the most shocking "Celebrity Moment of 2015" by UK's Channel 5.

On February 26, 2015, Madonna appeared on The Jonathan Ross Show in the United Kingdom, which aired on March 14. She performed an edited version of "Living for Love" wearing a black matador dress. On March 2, Madonna appeared on France's Le Grand Journal show, where an edited version of "Living for Love" was also performed. Lionel Nicaise from MCM observed that Madonna did not wear any cape during the performance. Writing for Idolator, Bradley Stern noted that the performance used an "energetic remix" of the song, with MNEK's vocals in the background. There was also voguing and during one segment Madonna climbed atop a piano to sing the song. Two weeks later, similar performance aired on The Ellen DeGeneres Show in the US, where she was joined by DeGeneres onstage at the end of the performance. Madonna added the song on the third section of the set list of her 2015–16 Rebel Heart Tour. The singer had enlisted a Spanish tailoring company from Zaragoza for creating two bullfighter traje de luces costume, along with a cape and matador related costumes for her backing dancers. Set to a remix of the song, the performance had the same choreography as that of the Brit Awards. Jordan Zivitz of Montreal Gazette said that the performance was one of "the evening's minor victories" calling it a "sulphur-scented campiness", although he saw a smooth transition from "Living for Love" to the next section of the tour. The performance of the song at the March 19–20, 2016 shows in Sydney's Allphones Arena was recorded and released in Madonna's fifth live album, Rebel Heart Tour. During the Celebration Tour, an instrumental extract of this version was played as an interlude.

== Track listings and formats ==
- CD single
1. "Living for Love" – 3:38
2. "Living for Love" (Offer Nissim Living for Drama Mix) – 6:34
- Digital download
1. "Living for Love" – 3:38
- Digital download (Remixes)
1. "Living for Love" (Michael Diamond Remix) – 4:56
2. "Living for Love" (Djemba Djemba Club Mix) – 5:48
3. "Living for Love" (Erick Morillo Club Mix) – 6:12
4. "Living for Love" (Thrill Remix) – 5:11
5. "Living for Love" (Offer Nissim Living for Drama Mix) – 6:34
6. "Living for Love" (Offer Nissim Dub) – 7:15
7. "Living for Love" (DJ Paulo Club Mix) – 8:15
8. "Living for Love" (Mike Rizzo's Funk Generation Club) – 7:03
9. "Living for Love" (Dirty Pop Remix) – 4:58
10. "Living for Love" (Paulo & Jackinsky Full Vocal Mix) – 7:14
11. "Living for Love" (Funk Generation & H3dRush Dub) – 6:07
- CD maxi single
1. "Living for Love" – 3:38
2. "Living for Love" (Mike Rizzo's Funk Generation Club) – 7:02
3. "Living for Love" (Offer Nissim Living for Drama Mix) – 6:33
4. "Living for Love" (Djemba Djemba Club Mix) – 5:47
- Digital download (The Remixes 1)
1. "Living for Love" (Mike Rizzo's Funk Generation Club) – 7:03
2. "Living for Love" (Djemba Djemba Club Mix) – 5:47
3. "Living for Love" (Erick Morillo Club Mix) – 6:12
4. "Living for Love" (DJ Paulo Club Mix) – 8:15
- Digital download (The Remixes 2)
1. "Living for Love" (Thrill Remix) – 5:10
2. "Living for Love" (Dirty Pop Remix) – 4:59
3. "Living for Love" (Offer Nissim Living for Drama Mix) – 6:30
4. "Living for Love" (Offer Nissim Dub) – 7:12

== Credits and personnel ==
Credits adapted from Madonna's official website.

=== Management ===
- MNEK appears courtesy of Virgin EMI Records, a division of Universal Music Operations.
- Alicia Keys appears courtesy of RCA Records.
- Webo Girl Publishing, Inc. (ASCAP) / Songs Music Publishing, LLC, "I Like Turtles" Music and Songs of SMP (ASCAP) / EMI April Music, Inc., MoZella Mo Music (ASCAP) / Atlas Music Publishing and Gadfly Songs (ASCAP) / Lion of God Publishing Co. (ASCAP), Kobalt Songs Music Publishing

=== Personnel ===
- Madonna – vocals, songwriter, producer
- Diplo – songwriter, producer
- Ariel Rechtshaid – songwriter, producer
- Toby Gad – songwriter, musician
- Maureen McDonald – songwriter
- Alicia Keys – piano
- London Community Gospel Choir – background vocals
- Ann Mincieli – additional recording
- MNEK – background vocals
- Demacio "Demo" Castellon – engineer, mixer
- Nick Rowe – engineer
- Santell – background vocals
- Angie Teo – additional recording, additional mixing

== Charts ==
=== Weekly charts ===
Chart (2015)	Peak position
Australia (ARIA)	157
Belgium (Ultratip Bubbling Under Flanders)	4
Belgium Dance (Ultratop Flanders)	21
Belgium (Ultratop 50 Wallonia)	43
Belgium Dance (Ultratop Wallonia)	18
Canada Hot 100 (Billboard)	92
CIS Airplay (TopHit)	116
Czech Republic Airplay (ČNS IFPI)	46
Finland Download (Latauslista)	7
France (SNEP)	50
Germany (GfK)	40
Hungary (Editors' Choice Top 40)	35
Hungary (Single Top 40)	12
Ireland (IRMA)	79
Israel (Media Forest)	4
Italy (FIMI)	30
Japan Hot 100 (Billboard)	11
Lebanon (The Official Lebanese Top 20)	20
Netherlands (Dutch Top 40 Tipparade)	18
Russia Airplay (Tophit)	116
Scottish Singles Sales (Official Charts)	15
South Korea (Gaon)	71
Spain (Promusicae)	21
Spanish Albums (Promusicae) "Living for Love" remixes	93
Sweden (DigiListan)	8
Switzerland (Schweizer Hitparade)	49
UK Singles (Official Charts)	26
US Bubbling Under Hot 100 (Billboard)	8
US Dance Club Songs (Billboard)	1
US Hot Dance/Electronic Songs (Billboard)	9
US Hot Singles Sales (Billboard)	3
US Pop Airplay (Billboard)	36

=== Year-end charts ===
Chart (2015)	Position
US Dance Club Songs (Billboard)	4
US Hot Dance/Electronic Songs (Billboard)	43

== Certifications and sales ==
Region	Certification	Certified units/sales
Brazil (Pro-Música Brasil)	Gold	30,000^{‡}
France	—	7,000
Italy (FIMI)	Gold	25,000^{‡}
United States	—	41,000
^{‡} Sales+streaming figures based on certification alone.

== Release history ==
Country	Date	Format	Label	Ref.
Worldwide	December 20, 2014	Digital download	Universal	
Italy	December 22, 2014	Contemporary hit radio	Universal	
United States	February 9, 2015	Digital download (Remixes)	Interscope	
United States	February 10, 2015	Contemporary hit radio	Interscope	
United Kingdom	February 25, 2015	Digital download	Polydor	
United Kingdom	February 25, 2015	Digital download (The Remixes 1)	Polydor	
United Kingdom	February 25, 2015	Digital download (The Remixes 2)	Polydor	
Germany	February 27, 2015	CD single	Universal	
Worldwide	March 9, 2015	CD single	Universal	

== See also ==
- Artists with the most number-ones on the U.S. dance chart
- List of number-one dance singles of 2015 (U.S.)
- List of Madonna records and achievements
