= 2026 UK Music Video Awards =

- Date: 4 November 2026
- Location: Roundhouse, London
- Hosted by: Ana Matronic
- Most wins: Gener8ion and Yung Lean (5)
- Most nominations: Charli XCX (9)
- Website: www.ukmva.com

The 2026 UK Music Video Awards were held on 4 November 2026, recognising the best in music videos and music flimmaking from United Kingdom and internationally released between August 2025 and August 2026. Submissions for the awards were open from 10 June to 3 August.

The ceremony was presented at Roundhouse in London, returning to the venue after four consecutive ceremonies held at Magazine London. It was seventh time the awards are held at the venue. American singer and former Scissor Sisters frontwoman Ana Matronic served as the host for the fourth consecutive year. Nominations were announced on 1 October 2026. British singer Charli XCX led the nominations with nine across six different music videos, followed by Irish hip-hop band Kneecap with eight.

French DJ Gener8ion and Swedish rapper Yung Lean received the most awards with five wins (including Video of the Year), all for the music video for their collaboration "Storm", directed by Romain Gavras. Music video commissioner John Moule was honoured posthumously with the Legend Award.

== Video of the Year ==
Video of the Year
- Gener8ion featuring Yung Lean – "Storm"
  Director: Romain Gavras

== Video Genre Categories ==
Best Pop Video – UK	Best Pop Video – International
Harry Styles – "Aperture" Director: Aube Perrie; Charli XCX – "Camera" Director: Aidan Zamiri; Meek – "Fabulous" Director: Sophie Muller and Theo Adams; Flo – "Leak It" Director: Olivia de Camps; Pinkpantheress and Zara Larsson – "Stateside" Director: Charlotte Rutherford; Charli XCX – "Wink Wink" Director: Aidan Zamiri	Rosalía featuring Björk and Yves Tumor – "Berghain" Director: Nicolás Méndez; Madonna – Confessions II – The Film Director: Torso; Theodora – "Des mythos" Director: Melchior Leroux; Tove Lo – "I'm Your Girl Right?" Director: Nogari; Sabrina Carpenter – "Tears" Director: Bardia Zeinali; Angèle featuring Justice – "What You Want" Director: (La)Horde
Best R&B / Soul / Jazz Video – UK	Best R&B / Soul / Jazz Video – International
Joy Crookes – "Painkiller" Director: Ethan & Tom; Alewya – "City of Symbols" Director: Mollie Mills; Wesley Joseph featuring Jorja Smith – "July" Director: Wesley Joseph; Ezra Collective featuring Pa Salieu – "Only Love" Director: Ebeneza Blanche; Tom Misch – "Sisters with Me" Director: Juliet Klottrup; Olivia Dean – "So Easy (To Fall in Love)" Director: Jake Erland	Kelsey Lu – "Running to Pain" Director: Savanah Leaf; Amber Mark featuring Anderson .Paak – "Don't Remind Me" Director: Olivia de Camps; Baby Keem – "Good Flirts" Director: Renell Medrano; Laufey – "Madwoman" Director: Warren Fu; Ibeyi – "Offerings" Director: Corry van Rhijin and Román Pichón Herrera; Ayra Starr – "Tornado" Director: Melchior Leroux
Best Dance / Electronic Video – UK	Best Dance / Electronic Video – International
A. G. Cook – "Residue" Director: Aidan Zamiri; Barry Can't Swim – "Dance Dance Dance!" Director: Dan French; Fred Again, Kettama and Shady Nasty – "Hardstyle 2" Director: rubberband.; Bonobo – "Me and You" Director: in/out; Overmono – "Pure Devotion" Director: Rollo Jackson; Kettama – "Sort It Out" Director: Hugh Mulhern	Gener8ion featuring Yung Lean – "Storm" Director: Romain Gavras; Povoa x Madge – "Beat Bunny" Director: Tanner K. Williams; Fred Again and Ca7riel & Paco Amoroso – "Beto's Horns" (Fred Remix) Director: Loose; Purple Disco Machine – "Disco Cherry" Director: Maxim Kelly; Channel Tres – "Medicine" Director: Onda; Kneecap featuring Paul Hartnoll – "Sayōnara" Director: Finn Keenan
Best Rock Video – UK	Best Rock Video – International
Makeshift Art Bar – "Discipline" Director: Colin Peppard; Beabadoobee featuring The Marias – "All I Did Was Dream of You" Director: Jake Erland and Aboveground; The Last Dinner Party – "Count the Ways" Director: Grapjer; The Rolling Stones – "Jealous Lover" Director: Chris Barrett and Luke Taylor; Wolf Alice – "Just Two Girls" Director: Colin Sol; Charli XCX – "Rock Music" Director: Aidan Zamiri	The Neighbourhood – "Hula Girl" Director: Ramez Silyan; Gurriers – "Nothing Happens Twice" Director: Thomas James; Foo Fighters – "Of All People" Director: Alex Acy; Dillom – "Rojo Profundo" Director: Noduerm0; Genesis Owusu – "Stampede" Director: Isaac Brown; Atarashii Gakko! – "TTTTOKYO" Director: Mackenzie Sheppard
Best Alternative Video – UK	Best Alternative Video – International
Jim Legxacy – "'06 Wayne Rooney" Director: Lauzza; JJerome87 – "Brush Me Like a Horse" Director: Alex Takács; James Blake – "Death of Love" Director: Harrison Adair; Novo Amor and Yvette Young – "Monty" Director: Leo Villares and Victor Nauwynck; Wet Leg – "Pokemon" Director: Elliot Arndt; Truman featuring Isabel – "Tell Him" Director: Saul Abraham	Kneecap featuring Kae Tempest – "Irish Goodbye" Director: Thomas James; Alaskan Tapes – "Holocene" Director: Andrew de Zen; Balming Tiger – "Keep On" Director: Pennacky; Apashe – "Kyiv" Director: Adrián Villagomez; Phoebe Bridgers – "Lost Boys" Director: Lance Oppenheim and Pablo Rochat; Mitski – "Where's My Phone" Director: Noel Paul
Best Hip Hop / Grime / Rap Video – UK	Best Hip Hop / Grime / Rap Video – International
Kwn – "Risk It All" Director: Sophie Jones; AntsLive – "Billie Holiday" Director: Billy King; Dave and Kano – "Chapter 16" Director: Edem Wornoo; Wesley Joseph featuring Danny Brown – "Peace of Mind" Director: Harrison Adair; 21 Savage featuring Young Nudy – "Stepbrothers" Director: Wesley Joseph; Dave – "The Boy Who Played the Harp" Director: Gabriel Moses	ASAP Rocky – "Helicopter" Director: Dan Streit; Mond – "BZNS" Director: Ahmed Razeek; Rich the Kid – "Calling My Line" Director: Bleu Desert; ASAP Rocky – "Punk Rocky" Director: Folkert Verdoorn and Simon Becks; Asinine – "Si le soleil existe" Director: Jules Harbulot; Tierra Whack – "Wax Paper" Director: child.
Best Pop / R&B / Soul / Jazz Video – Newcomer	Best Rock / Alternative Video – Newcomer
Béesau – "Pas encore" Director: Remi Belleville; Ibeyi – "Aset" Director: Corry van Rhijin and Román Pichón Herrera; Chiara Savasta – "Cross Control Patrol" Director: Alex Acy and Chris Yellen; Ebony – "Rage" Director: Sinclair; MNEK – "Reverse!!" Director: Douglas Reddan; Oklou featuring FKA twigs – "Viscus" Director: Gil Gharbi	American Football – "Bad Moons" Director: Alex Acy and Remi Belleville; Keg – "Call Me Satan" Director: Asa Gartland; Bonnie Banane – "Hoes of Na" Director: Alma de Ricou and Manon Engel; Space Afrika – "If This Is Hell" Director: Pablo Dunkerly; Common Saints – "Illusions" Director: Ben Harris; Bilderbuch – "Irgendwo" Director: Stanko Repac
Best Dance / Electronic Video – Newcomer	Best Hip Hop / Grime / Rap Video – Newcomer
Logic1000 featuring Christine and the Queens – "The Only One" Director: Dora Paphides; Gilm0re – "Another Breathtaking Melody" Director: Ricky Dick; Shelter 12 and Benjamin Amaru – "Everybody Feels That Way (From Time to Time)" Director: Sinan Taner; Belaria – "Losing Control" Director: Roso; Venbee – "Not My Day" Director: Dante Richardson; LB aka LABAT and notinbed – "Take Me Home" Director: Jules Harbulot	TR Gobrazy – "Forreduci" Director: Will Norman; John Glacier – "Bond Girl" Director: Léa Ceheivi; BK – "Castelos & Ruinas" Director: Willy Haji and Poeta Visual; Coast Contra – "Don't Worry" Director: Bard Ezzat; Yvnnis – "Emoticone" Director: Lea Esmaili; Corto.alto featuring Mick Jenkins – "Whodis" Director: Shynite
Best Low Budget Video or Visualizer
Tamara Flores – "Chingona" Director: Rupert Höller; Foule – "Brigitte" Director: Vicky Schoukroun; Andy – "Can't Wait" Director: Harry Welsh; Makeshift Art Bar – "Discipline" Director: Colin Peppard; Shelter 12 and Benjamin Amaru – "Everybody Feels That Way (From Time to Time)" Director: Sinan Taner; Farmar – "Rambla" Director: Rupert Höller

== Technical and Craft Categories ==
Best Performance in a Video	Best Casting in a Video
Gener8ion featuring Yung Lean – "Storm" Performers: Performance Group (Note: Yung Lean, Leo Merrien, Valentin Beaufils, Matteo Masson, Max Cookward, Noah Bruyninckx, Ethan Byrotheau Elkaim, Martin Boyer, Matys Pouvait, Lino Echenstein, Adrian Torres, Nicolas Lamaina, Gabriel Wastchenkoketelaer, Matisse Blocken, Largo Jacques, Corneel Goethals, Micah Shapiro, Hugo Finfe, Adrien Lefebvre, Sebastián Latorre, Paul Raer Mackiewicz, Antoine Pierquin, Yann Louvrier Sain Mary, Christian Corsi, Henri Klein, Mathis Backes, Rio Moons, Anton Obukhivskyi, Tonin Fontanel, Kennedy Mukadi, Tom wan de Weghe, Malyk Toussaint, Hugo Daubresse, Rodrigo López, Pantaleone di Domenico, Andrea Schmitz, Antonio Serrapiglio, Marien Mazzoni, Vince de Cock, Tom Godfroid, Sander Los, Carl Giacomelli Schanberg, Andrea Tenerini, Paul Cretin-Maitenaz, Alex Gosmore, Noah Meteau, Mateusz Piekarski, Lewis Cooke, Jarno de Vos, Faye El Hadji Mbaye, Gabin Pau, Ronan Tchio, Robert Cornejo, Vilim Polianec, David Kodys, Paul-Loup Denis, Joshua Salamona Bisi, Paul van Belleghem, Simon Nelissen, Alex Lawicki, Manel Llopis Rodriguez, Pierre Moiret, Enki Hermans, Felipe Londoño, Wouter Rodeyns and Noah Goffin); Harry Styles – "Aperture" Performer: Harry Styles; Charli XCX – "Camera" Performer: Vincent Cassel; Kneecap featuring Kae Tempest – "Irish Goodbye" Performers: Performance Group (Note: Móglaí Bap, Mo Chara, DJ Próvaí, Kae Tempest, Colm O'Brien, Barry Dobson, Deirdre O'Kane, Liam Cunningham, Patricia Twomey, Emmanuel Okoye, Callan Cummins, Cúán Hosty-Blaney, Peter Newington, Joni Morris, Sue Mather, Lucia Mather, Garvin Power, Daire Power, Dylan Moran, Nicole Roche, Patricia Regan and David Bruce); Kneecap featuring Paul Hartnoll – "Sayōnara" Performer: Jamie-Lee O'Donnell; Jungle – "Someday, Somewhere" Performers: Will West, Kaycee Rice, Ella Moce, Igor Martins, Jacob Rassi, Jaih Betote, Mack Jarrett, Marlee Hightower, Rob Bynes and Selene Irehi	Gener8ion featuring Yung Lean – "Storm" Casting director: Marie Levy; Additional casting: Coralie Rose; Povoa x Madge – "Beat Bunny" Casting director: Magen Young and Robbie Blue; Wallace Cleaver – "Incendie" Casting director: Andrea Thirion; Kneecap featuring Kae Tempest – "Irish Goodbye" Casting director: Hannah Ashby-Ward; Tom Misch – "Sisters with Me" Casting director: Juliet Klottrup; Truman featuring Isabel – "Tell Him" Casting director: Heather Bastenu
Best Production Design in a Video	Best Styling in a Video
Novo Amor and Yvette Young – "Monty" Production designer: Mafer Ramirez; Ariana Grande – "Hate That I Made You Love Me" Production designer: Taisa Malouf; Taylor Swift – "Opalite" Production designer: Arthur de Borman and Ethan Tobman; Balming Tiger – "Keep On" Production designer: Yoomi Park; Dave – "The Boy Who Played the Harp" Production designer: David Hamilton; Olivia Rodrigo – "The Cure" Production designer: Liam Moore	Rosalía featuring Björk and Yves Tumor – "Berghain" Stylist: José Carayol; Jade – "Church" Stylist: Maximilian Raynor; Tove Lo – "I'm Your Girl Right?" Stylists: Annie + Hannah, Nick Lennon, Marina Vieira and Suy Abreu; Adéla – "KBG" Stylist: Chris Horan; Charli XCX – "SS26" Stylists: Chris Horan and Juan Corrales; Pinkpantheress and Zara Larsson – "Stateside" Stylist: Milena Agbaba, Caterina Ospina and Ellie Walker
Best Cinematography in a Video	Best Cinematography in a Video – Newcomer
Mond – "BZNS" Cinematographer: Mostafa El Kashef; Madonna – Confessions II – The Film Cinematographer: Daniel Landin; Charli XCX featuring John Cale – "House" Cinematographer: Ben Carey; Tove Lo – "I'm Your Girl Right?" Cinematographer: Andrew Chemetoff; Tamino – "Raven" Cinematographer: João de Botelho; Gener8ion featuring Yung Lean – "Storm" Cinematographers: Lara Perrotte and Matias Boucard	Coast Contra – "Don't Worry" Cinematographer: Bard Ezzat; Erin LeCount – "Alice" Cinematographer: Kit Dale; Navy Blue – "Commencement" Cinematographer: George Beattie; Bilderbuch – "Irgendwo" Cinematographer: Stanko Repac; Joy Crookes – "Painkiller" Cinematographer: Ryan Zeller; Asinine – "Si le soleil existe" Cinematographer: Cyan Mariani
Best Colour Grading in a Video	Best Colour Grading in a Video – Newcomer
Ezra Collective featuring Pa Salieu – "Only Love" Colourist: Connor Coolbear at Electric Theatre Collective; Beabadoobee featuring The Marias – "All I Did Was Dream of You" Colourist: Tim Smith at Rascal; Baby Keem – "Good Flirts" Colourist: Mikey Pehanich at Royal Muster; Ariana Grande – "Petal" Colourist: Kaitlyn Battistelli at Ethos Studio; Odeal – "Pretty Girls" Colourist: Juliette Wileman at Studio RM; Charli XCX – "Wink Wink" Colourist: Dante Pasquinelli at Ethos Studio	Kneecap featuring Kae Tempest – "Irish Goodbye" Colourist: Nathaniel Skeels at The Shop; Kota the Friend – "Anyway" Colourist: Mackenzie Taylor at Electric Theatre Collective; Henry Coke – "I Want to Feel It in My Heart" Colourist: Nuval Jolly at Electric Theatre Collective; Kelela – "Linknb" Colourist: John Layton at Avenues; Adam Oh – "Stroke" Colourists: Annika White and Carl Knight at Clam Studios; Reign Judge – "Wouldn't You Like to Know" Colourist: Sam Fischer at Ink
Best Editing in a Video	Best Editing in a Video – Newcomer
Kneecap featuring Paul Hartnoll – "Sayōnara" Editors: Finn Keenan and Ed Fay; Povoa x Madge – "Beat Bunny" Editor: Carlos Crooks at Makemake; Charli XCX featuring John Cale – "House" Editor: Dylan Edwards at Cabin Edit; ASAP Rocky – "Punk Rocky" Editor: Fouad Gaber at Cabin Edit; Gener8ion featuring Yung Lean – "Storm" Editor: Benjamin Weill at Poster; Olivia Rodrigo – "The Book of Love" Editor: Thomas Carter at Trim Editing	Kettama – "Man with a Second Face" Editor: Craig Griffiths at Cabin Edit; George Riley – "Drip" Editor: Eden Reat at The Assembly Rooms; Mura Masa – "I'm Really Hot (for Myself)" Editor: Eden Read at The Assembly Rooms; Belaria – "Losing Control" Editor: Lucas Mary at Pelican; Joy Crookes – "Painkiller" Editor: Liv Ay at Trim Editing; Supermodel – "Seventeen Days" Editor: Hannah Yerbury
Best Choreography in a Video	Best Visual Effects in a Video
Gener8ion featuring Yung Lean – "Storm" Choreographer: Damien Jalet; Povoa x Madge – "Beat Bunny" Choreographer: Robbie Blue; Love Spells – "Don't Touch" Choreographer: Shay Latukolan; FKA twigs – "Hard" Choreographer: James Vu Ahn Pham; Adéla – "KBG" Choreographer: Robbie Blue; No Na – "Work" Choreographer: Sienna Lalau	Theodora – "Des mythos" VFX: Melchior Leroux at Paume; Jim Legxacy – "'06 Wayne Rooney" VFX: Lifeavx, Michos and Minesweeper at Neuron Studios; Rich the Kid – "Calling My Line" VFX: Jean de Font Reaulx, Tristan Corty, Pacôme Gabrillagues, Julien Mercier, Félix Gouarne, Rayan Tahtah and Tom Noordanus-Calmels at Archives; ASAP Rocky – "Helicopter" VFX: Dan Streit at Grin Machine; The Rolling Stones – "In the Stars" VFX: Mark Stannard at Black Kite Studios; J. Cole – "The Fall-Off Is Inevitable" VFX: Louis de Rollan, Flavio Fernandes, Jeremy Michel, Romain Livenais, Julie Hervieu and Laura François at Orage Studio
Best Animation in a Video
Tinariwen – "Erghad Afewo" Animators: Axel Digoix, Camille Lherminier, Léo Shweitzer, Jean Curtois, Anaïs Moumet and Paul Surmont at Wizz; Cassius – "Dance On" Animators: Mrzyk & Moriceau, Armand Beraud, Josselin Facon, Madé Castel and Marguerite de Crécy; Mr. Bruce featuring Brian Eno and Homeboy Sandman – "How Will We Know" Animator: Ian Bruce; The Rolling Stones – "Shame, Shame, Shame" Animators: Amy Hancock, Adolfo Redaño and Ewan Jones Morris; Thundercat and Mac Miller – "She Knows Too Much" Animators: Joshua Clauss, Cruz Animation, Turçin Soylu, Lola Lefèvre, Tom Jeanbourquin, Valentin Gaubert, Frederick Venet, Cecil Tawale, Titouan Crasson, Barnabé Cantin, Ines Fragueiro, Yutong Zhang and Zofia Klamka at Mathematic Studio; Lex Amarni – "The Kill 2" Animator: Chris Ullens

== Special Video Categories ==
Best Live Video	Best Special Video Project
Fred Again, Ezra Collective, Ca7riel & Paco Amoroso – "Beto's Horns" (Ezra Remix) Director: Loose; James Blake – "Death of Love" Director: Harrison Adair; Anaiis – "Devotion & the Black Diving" (Live Session) Director: Reuben Bastienne-Lewis; Nectar Woode – "Live on the Rooftop with Friends" Directors: Marcus Prouse Jr. and Nathan Ivor Barlow; Raye – "Nightingale Lane" (Live from Abbey Road Studios) Director: Becky Garner; Arca – XXXXX (Livestream) Director: Daniel Sannwald	War Child – Help(2) Directors: Jonathan Glazer, Billy Boyd Cape, John Angus Stewart and Talia Beale; André 3000 – 7 Piano Films Director: Graham Bomason; Madonna – Confessions II – The Film Director: Torso; Ezra Collective – Here Because of Hope Director: Ebeneza Blanche; Kneecap featuring Kae Tempest – "Irish Goodbye" Director: Thomas James; Ibeyi – "Offerings" Director: Corri van Rhijin and Román Pichón Herrera

== Individual and Company Categories ==
Best Director	Best New Director
Aidan Zamiri; Folkert Verdoorn and Simon Becks; Lee Suho; Jake Erland; Olivia de Camps; TORSO	Tanner K. Williams; Alex Acy; Ben Harris; Billy King; Léa Esmaili; Melchior Leroux
Best Producer	Best Executive Producer
Chris Murdoch; Alice Wills; Collin Druz; Maggie Curwin; Nathan Scherrer; Rowan Mackintosh King	Nnena Nwakodo; Alex Brinkman; Elizabeth Doonan; Kiran Mandia; Morgan Clement; Shelley Jones
Best Production Company	Best Creative Commissioner
Canada; Anonymous Content; Division; Iconoclast; Magna Studios; Object & Animal	Emily Jeffery (Polydor); Jake Crossland (Partisan); Kat Cattaneo (Sony Music); Kim Jarrett; Michael Lewin (Sony Music); Ruth Morris (Warp Records)
Best Agent	Legend Award
Claire Stubbs (Mouthpiece); Alexa Haywood (FreeAgent); André Reid (Rep Media); Lee Fairweather (Leethal Reppin); Nikhil Sinh Smith (Lux Artists); Sam Davey (Hurry Sundown)	John Moule
