= 2026 MTV Video Music Awards =

43rd edition of the MTV Video Music Awards held in 2026

- Date: Sunday, September 27, 2026 from 4:51 p.m. PDT
- Venue: Peacock Theater, Los Angeles, California
- Country: United States
- Hosted by: Snoop Dogg

Highlights
- Most awards: Madonna (7)
- Most nominations: Madonna (13)
- Website: mtv.com/vma

Television/radio coverage
- Network: CBS; Paramount+; MTV
- Viewership: 8.43 million
- Produced by: Bruce Gillmer; Jesse Ignjatovic; Barb Bialkowski; Van Toffler; Barry Barclay; Floris Bauer; Snoop Dogg
- Directed by: Micah Bickham

The 2026 MTV Video Music Awards were held at the Peacock Theater in Los Angeles, California, on September 27, 2026. It was broadcast live on CBS, streamed on Paramount+'s premium tier and simulcast on MTV. The show was hosted by rapper Snoop Dogg.

The ceremony recognized outstanding music videos and songs released between June 20, 2025, to June 18, 2026. Madonna was the most nominated and awarded artist, winning seven trophies out of thirteen nominations. Taylor Swift's "The Fate of Ophelia" won Video of the Year. Nirvana was honored with the Video Vanguard Award, and Swift with the inaugural MTV VMA Artist Director Honor. The music video for Swift's song "Patient Zero" premiered during the broadcast. The CBS and MTV telecast, along with a repeat airing on MTV, drew 8.43 million viewers in the United States, excluding streaming, the most-watched since 2015.

== Performances ==
On September 16, 2026, Madonna was announced as opening performer, her first performance at the VMAs in 23 years. The first round of performers were announced on September 17. The performers for the George Michael tribute were announced on September 22. A tribute to Dolly Parton by Kacey Musgraves was announced on September 23.

Artist(s)	Song(s)
Madonna	"One Step Away" (intro only) "Bring Your Love" (with Sabrina Carpenter) "Danceteria Afterhours" (with Charli XCX) (Note: With cameo appearances by Debi Mazar, Julia Garner, Fab Five Freddy, Tony Ward, Sombr, Seth Rogen and Andrew Watt.)
Raye	"I Will Overcome" "Where Is My Husband!"
Bruno Mars	"Dance With Me" (Pre-Taped from Caesars Superdome)
Kacey Musgraves	Tribute to Dolly Parton "I Will Always Love You" (Pre-Taped)
Shaboozey	"Cowgirl" "High Noon" (with Gunna)
Lisa	"Sawadika"
Sienna Spiro	"Great Expectation"
Sombr Raye Teddy Swims Adam Lambert Meek MNEK Saint Harison	Tribute to George Michael "Faith" "Father Figure" "I Knew You Were Waiting (For Me)" "Careless Whisper" "Freedom! '90"
Gener8ion Yung Lean	"Storm II"

== Presenters ==
Presenters were announced on September 24, 2026. Additional presenters were announced on September 26, 2026.

- Teyana Taylor – presented Best Pop
- Paris Hilton – introduced Bruno Mars
- Ciara Miller – introduced Shaboozey and Gunna
- Isabel May and David Corenswet – presented Best Collaboration
- Tyla – introduced Lisa
- Chuck D – presented the Video Vanguard Award to Nirvana
- Rachel Dratch and Emma Bunton – presented Artist of the Year
- Ella Bright and Belmont Cameli – introduced Sienna Spiro
- Dakota Johnson – presented the MTV VMA Artist Director Honors
- Charli XCX and Troye Sivan – presented Best Dance
- Orville Peck – introduced the George Michael tribute
- Alex Warren – presented Best New Artist
- Brandon Sklenar and Jeff Probst – introduced Gener8ion and Yung Lean
- Snoop Dogg (host) – presented Video of the Year

== Winners and nominees ==
The nominees were announced on August 18, 2026. The nominees in the social categories–Best Group, Best Long Form Video, Best Album and Song of Summer–were announced on September 18, with additional nominees for Best Album announced on the next day. Madonna led with thirteen nominations, tying Lady Gaga's 2010 record for the most nominations for an artist in a single year. She is followed by Taylor Swift with eleven; Sabrina Carpenter with nine; Ariana Grande with eight; Bruno Mars with seven; Ella Langley, PinkPantheress, and Zara Larsson with five; and Charli XCX, Gener8ion, Katseye, Lisa, Olivia Rodrigo, and Yung Lean with four.

Winners are listed first and highlighted in bold.

=== Voted categories ===
The winners of the following categories were chosen by fan votes.

**Video of the Year**: **Taylor Swift – "The Fate of Ophelia"**; Ariana Grande – "Hate That I Made You Love Me"; Bruno Mars – "I Just Might"; Gener8ion – "Storm" starring Yung Lean; Madonna – Confessions II – The Film; Sabrina Carpenter – "Tears"	**Artist of the Year**: **Madonna**; Ariana Grande; Bruno Mars; Morgan Wallen; Sabrina Carpenter; Taylor Swift
**Song of the Year**: **BTS – "Swim"**; Ella Langley – "Choosin' Texas"; Huntrix – "Golden"; Madonna and Sabrina Carpenter – "Bring Your Love"; Olivia Dean – "Man I Need"; PinkPantheress – "Stateside + Zara Larsson"; Raye – "Where Is My Husband!"	**Best New Artist** **(Presented by The General)**: **Sienna Spiro**; Bella Kay; Cortis; Magnus Ferrell; Malcolm Todd; Myles Smith; Stella Lefty
**Best Collaboration**: **Madonna and Sabrina Carpenter – "Bring Your Love"**; Clipse, Kendrick Lamar, Pusha T and Malice – "Chains & Whips"; French Montana and Max B – "Ever Since U Left Me"; PinkPantheress – "Stateside + Zara Larsson"; Shakira and Burna Boy – "Dai Dai"; Teyana Taylor and Lucky Daye – "Hard Part"	**Best Pop**: **Lisa – "Dream" featuring Kentaro Sakaguchi**; Ariana Grande – "Hate That I Made You Love Me"; Charli XCX – "SS26"; Olivia Rodrigo – "Drop Dead"; Sabrina Carpenter – "House Tour"; Tate McRae – "Nobody's Girl"; Taylor Swift – "The Fate of Ophelia"
**Best Hip-Hop**: **Cardi B featuring Kehlani – "Safe"**; Don Toliver – "E85"; Drake – "Janice STFU"; Megan Thee Stallion – "Lover Girl"; Travis Scott – "Dumbo"; Tyler, The Creator – "Sugar on My Tongue"	**Best R&B**: **Bruno Mars – "I Just Might"**; Chris Brown – "It Depends / Obvious"; Dave and Tems – "Raindance"; Justin Bieber – "Yukon"; Kehlani – "Folded"; Mariah the Scientist and Kali Uchis – "Is It a Crime"
**Best Alternative**: **Olivia Rodrigo – "The Cure"**; Geese – "Taxes"; MGK and Fred Durst – "Fix Ur Face"; Noah Kahan – "The Great Divide"; Sombr – "Homewrecker"; Tame Impala – "Dracula"; Twenty One Pilots – "Drag Path"	**Best Latin**: **Bad Bunny – "Nuevayol"**; Anitta and Shakira – "Choka Choka"; Fuerza Regida – "Tu Sancho"; Karol G – "Papasito"; Rosalía featuring Yahritza y su Esencia – "La Perla"; Ryan Castro, Kapo and Gangsta – "La Villa"; Shakira and Burna Boy – "Dai Dai"
**Best K-Pop**: **BTS – "Swim"**; Blackpink – "Jump"; Cortis – "RedRed"; Katseye – "Pinky Up"; Le Sserafim featuring J-Hope – "Spaghetti"; Lisa – "Dream" featuring Kentaro Sakaguchi	**Best Dance** **(Presented by Bacardi)**: **Madonna – Confessions II – The Film**; Bebe Rexha and Faithless – "New Religion"; Harry Styles – "Aperture"; Lady Gaga and Doechii – "Runway"; PinkPantheress – "Stateside + Zara Larsson"; Slayyyter – "Dance..."; Tate McRae – "Nobody's Girl"
**Best Country**: **Ella Langley – "Choosin' Texas"**; Kacey Musgraves – "Dry Spell"; Lainey Wilson – "Somewhere Over Laredo"; Luke Combs – "Back in the Saddle"; Shaboozey – "Cowgirl"; Stella Lefty – "Boston"; Tucker Wetmore – "Brunette"	**Best Group**: **BTS**; Blackpink; Cortis; Flo; Fuerza Regida; Geese; Katseye; Twenty One Pilots
**Best Long Form Video**: **Madonna – Confessions II – The Film**; Charli XCX – Music, Fashion, Film; Ella Langley – "Choosin' Texas"; Gener8ion – "Storm" starring Yung Lean	**Best Album**: **Madonna – Confessions II**; Bruno Mars – The Romantic; Drake – Iceman; Ella Langley – Dandelion; Harry Styles – Kiss All the Time. Disco, Occasionally; Olivia Dean – The Art of Loving; Olivia Rodrigo – You Seem Pretty Sad for a Girl So in Love; Sabrina Carpenter – Man's Best Friend; Taylor Swift – The Life of a Showgirl
**Song of Summer**: **Ariana Grande – "Hate That I Made You Love Me"**; Bruno Mars – "Risk It All"; Charli XCX – "Camera"; Ella Langley – "Choosin' Texas"; Katseye – "Hootie Frutti"; Latto featuring Doja Cat – "Okayyy"; Morgan Wallen – "Been By Now"; Olivia Dean – "So Easy (To Fall in Love)"; Olivia Rodrigo – "Stupid Song"; Sabrina Carpenter – "House Tour"; Slayyyter – "Brand New Chanel$"; Sombr – "Homewrecker"; Stella Lefty – "Boston"; Tame Impala and Jennie – "Dracula"; Taylor Swift – "I Knew It, I Knew You"

=== Professional categories ===
The winners of the following categories were chosen by industry professionals.

**Best Direction**: **Taylor Swift – "Opalite" (Director: Taylor Swift)**; Ariana Grande – "Hate That I Made You Love Me" (Director: Christian Breslauer); Bruno Mars – "I Just Might" (Directors: Bruno Mars and Daniel Ramos); Gener8ion – "Storm" starring Yung Lean (Director: Romain Gavras); Madonna – Confessions II – The Film (Director: TORSO); Sabrina Carpenter – "House Tour" (Directors: Sabrina Carpenter and Margaret Qualley)	**Best Art Direction**: **PinkPantheress – "Stateside + Zara Larsson" (Art Director: Furmaan Ahmed)**; Madonna – Confessions II – The Film (Art Director: TORSO and Arthur de Borman); Lady Gaga and Doechii – "Runway" (Art Director: Freyja Bardell); Charli XCX – "SS26" (Art Director: Nicola Scarlino); Sombr – "My Body Isn't Ready" (Art Director: Olivia McManus); Taylor Swift – "The Fate of Ophelia" (Art Director: Ethan Tobman)
**Best Cinematography**: **Madonna – Confessions II – The Film (Director of Photography: Daniel Landin)**; A$AP Rocky – "Punk Rocky" (Director of Photography: Jake Gabbay); Ariana Grande – "Hate That I Made You Love Me" (Director of Photography: Janusz Kamiński); Lisa – "Dream" featuring Kentaro Sakaguchi (Director of Photography: Eumko); Shaboozey – "Cowgirl" (Director of Photography: Mitchell Maher Perrin); Taylor Swift – "The Fate of Ophelia" (Director of Photography: Rodrigo Prieto)	**Best Editing**: **Sabrina Carpenter – "House Tour" (Editor: Sofia Kerpan at Modern Post)**; Ariana Grande – "Hate That I Made You Love Me" (Editor: Luis Caraza Peimbert); Bruno Mars – "I Just Might" (Editor: Daniel Ramos); Lisa – "Dream" featuring Kentaro Sakaguchi (Editor: Kwon O-jun); Madonna – Confessions II – The Film (Editors: Will Town, Lauren Friedman and Danny Tull); Taylor Swift – "The Fate of Ophelia" (Editor: Chancler Haynes)
**Best Choreography**: **Madonna – Confessions II – The Film (Choreographer: Damien Jalet, Megan Lawson, Young Boy Dancing Group and Nicolas Huchard)**; Gener8ion – "Storm" starring Yung Lean (Choreographer: Damien Jalet); Harry Styles – "Dance No More" (Choreographer: Ryan Heffington); Katseye – "Pinky Up" (Choreographers: Grant Gilmore, Sohey Sugihara, Sergio Reis, and Zacc Milne); Tate McRae – "Nobody's Girl" (Choreographer: (LA)HORDE, Arthur Harel, Marine Brutti, and Jonathan Debrouwer); Taylor Swift – "The Fate of Ophelia" (Choreographers: Mandy Moore and Amanda Balen)	**Best Visual Effects**: **Ariana Grande – "Hate That I Made You Love Me" (Visual Effects: Mathematic Studio, Hadi Dahrouge, and Jehan Bouazza)**; Jisoo and Zayn – "Eyes Closed" (Visual Effects: Serhii Solodkyi); Madonna – Confessions II – The Film (Visual Effects: Monumental); PinkPantheress – "Stateside + Zara Larsson" (Visual Effects: Copenhagen VFX); Raye featuring Hans Zimmer – "Click Clack Symphony" (Visual Effects: Frame23 Studio); Taylor Swift – "The Fate of Ophelia" (Visual Effects: Parliament)

=== Special awards ===
The recipient of the Video Vanguard was announced on September 9, 2026. The recipient of the inaugural MTV VMA Artist Director Honors was announced on September 21.

- Video Vanguard Award: Nirvana
- MTV VMA Artist Director Honors: Taylor Swift

== Artists with multiple wins and nominations ==
Artists who received multiple awards
Wins	Artist
7	Madonna
3	BTS
3	Taylor Swift
2	Ariana Grande
2	Sabrina Carpenter

Artists who received multiple nominations
Nominations	Artist
13	Madonna
11	Taylor Swift
9	Sabrina Carpenter
8	Ariana Grande
7	Bruno Mars
5	Ella Langley
5	PinkPantheress
5	Zara Larsson
4	Charli XCX
4	Gener8ion
4	Katseye
4	Kentaro Sakaguchi
4	Lisa
4	Olivia Rodrigo
4	Yung Lean
3	BTS
3	Cortis
3	Harry Styles
3	Olivia Dean
3	Shakira
3	Sombr
3	Stella Lefty
3	Tate McRae
2	Blackpink
2	Burna Boy
2	Doechii
2	Drake
2	Fuerza Regida
2	Geese
2	Kehlani
2	Lady Gaga
2	Morgan Wallen
2	Raye
2	Shaboozey
2	Slayyyter
2	Tame Impala
2	Twenty One Pilots

=== Music Videos with multiple wins and nominations ===
Music Videos that received multiple awards
Wins	Artist	Music Video
4	Madonna	Confessions II – The Film

Music Videos that received multiple nominations
Nominations	Artist	Music Video
9	Madonna	Confessions II – The Film
7	Ariana Grande	"Hate That I Made You Love Me"
7	Taylor Swift	"The Fate of Ophelia"
5	PinkPantheress	"Stateside + Zara Larsson"
4	Bruno Mars	"I Just Might"
4	Ella Langley	"Choosin' Texas"
4	Gener8ion	"Storm" starring Yung Lean
4	Lisa (featuring Kentaro Sakaguchi)	"Dream"
4	Sabrina Carpenter	"House Tour"
3	Tate McRae	"Nobody's Girl"
2	BTS	"Swim"
2	Charli XCX	"SS26"
2	Katseye	"Pinky Up"
2	Lady Gaga & Doechii	"Runway"
2	Madonna & Sabrina Carpenter	"Bring Your Love"
2	Shaboozey	"Cowgirl"
2	Shakira & Burna Boy	"Dai Dai"
2	Sombr	"Homewrecker"
2	Stella Lefty	"Boston"
