= Opalite (song) =

2026 single by Taylor Swift

Single by Taylor Swift

from the album The Life of a Showgirl
- Released: January 12, 2026
- Studio: MXM; Shellback (Stockholm)
- Genre: Pop rock; soft rock; synth-pop
- Length: 3:55
- Label: Republic
- Songwriters: Taylor Swift; Max Martin; Shellback
- Producers: Taylor Swift; Max Martin; Shellback

Taylor Swift singles chronology
"The Fate of Ophelia" (2025)	"Opalite" (2026)	"Elizabeth Taylor" (2026)

Music video
- "Opalite" on YouTube

"Opalite" is a song by the American singer-songwriter Taylor Swift from her twelfth studio album, The Life of a Showgirl (2025). Swift wrote and produced "Opalite" with the Swedish musicians Max Martin and Shellback. Titled after artificial opals, "Opalite" is a love song about how Swift and her romantic partner create happiness together after a string of miseries in previous relationships. Using gemstone metaphors, the lyrics visualize painful experiences as dark "onyx" nights and subsequent joy as a bright, opalescent sky. It is an upbeat pop rock, soft rock, and synth-pop track, driven by a jangle, a disco groove, and a bouncy swing arrangement of bass and vocal harmonies.

"Opalite" was released as the second single from The Life of a Showgirl on January 12, 2026. Music critics generally praised its breezy sound and uplifting message; many deemed it an album highlight. The track reached number one in Germany, the Philippines, the United Kingdom, and the United States, and number two on the Billboard Global 200 chart as well as in Australia, Austria, Canada, Ireland, New Zealand, Portugal, and Switzerland. The song has been certified diamond in Brazil, multi-platinum in Canada and New Zealand, and platinum in Australia, Belgium, France, Portugal, and the United Kingdom. At the 69th Annual Grammy Awards, the Chris Lake remix has been nominated for Best Remixed Recording, Non-Classical.

Swift wrote and directed the music video for "Opalite", which was released on Spotify and Apple Music on February 6, 2026. The video was shot on film and incorporates 1990s rom-com aesthetics, with cinematography by Rodrigo Prieto. It features the cast of an October 2025 episode of The Graham Norton Show during the promotional cycle of The Life of a Showgirl, starring Swift opposite Domhnall Gleeson, with Greta Lee, Jodie Turner-Smith, Lewis Capaldi, and Graham Norton in supporting roles, as well as a cameo and voiceover by Cillian Murphy. Swift and Gleeson play two lonely people who fall in love with each other after using an "Opalite" potion. It won Best Direction at the 2026 MTV Video Music Awards.

== Background and release ==
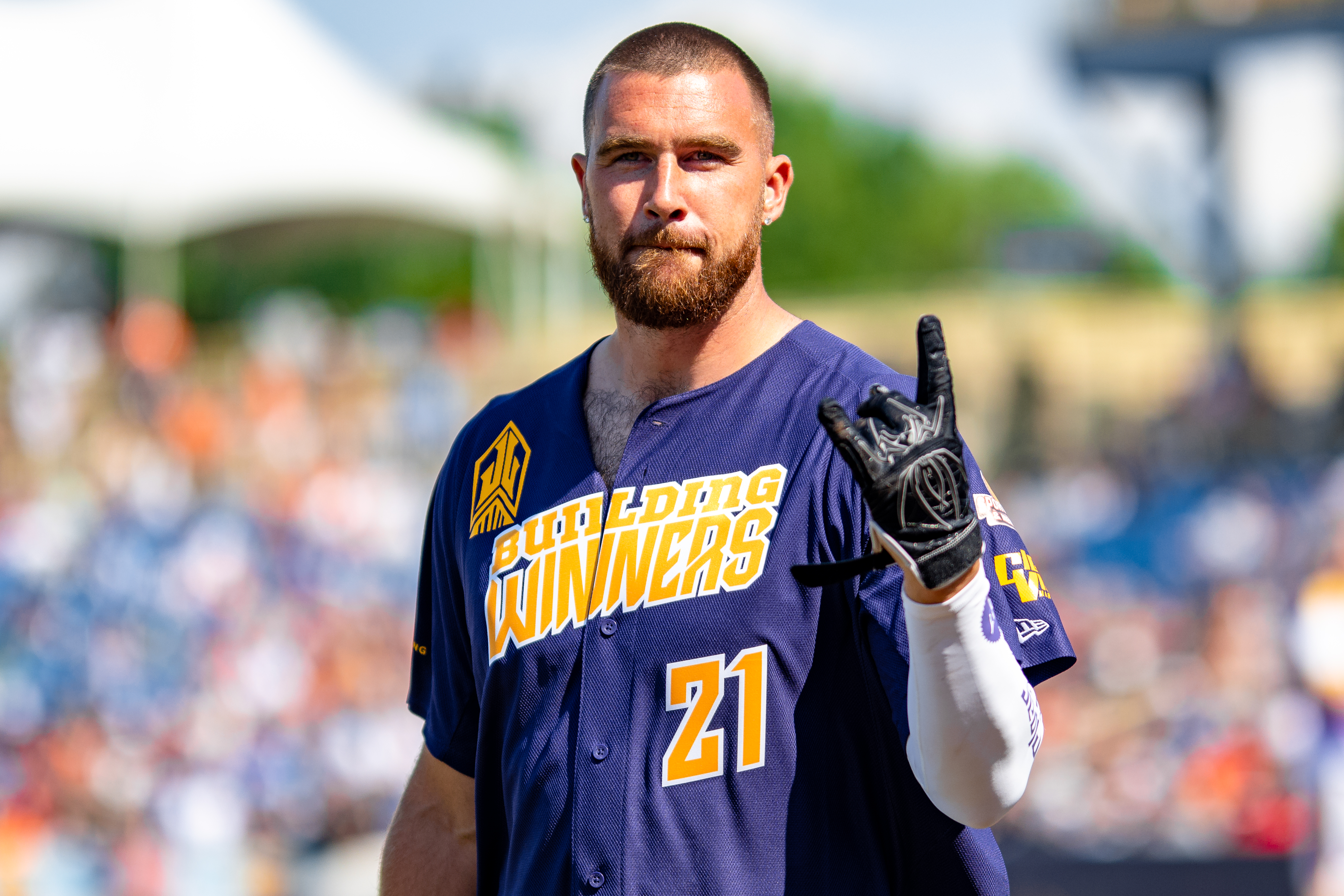
Swift's husband Travis Kelce was an inspiration for the song.

On August 13, 2025, Taylor Swift announced her twelfth studio album, The Life of a Showgirl, during an episode of New Heights, a sports podcast co-hosted by her then-boyfriend (now husband) Travis Kelce and his brother Jason. "Opalite" was also announced that day as the third track on the album. Swift's childhood love of opals inspired the song's title. Opal is also Kelce's birthstone. An opalite is an artificial opal—a synthetic opalescent glass, simulating various opal and moonstone gems. Swift drew inspiration from these facts, employing opalite as a metaphor for the idea that happiness can be voluntarily created. Swift described the song as "a song about forgiving yourself for having gone through something that didn't pan out the way you wanted it to and giving yourself permission to not have it all figured out or not marry the first person you ever dated". In his podcast New Heights, Kelce described it as his favorite song on the album.

After the release of The Life of a Showgirl, "Opalite" performed well on charts, garnered consistent airplay, and became a fan favorite. "Opalite" became the second single from The Life of a Showgirl. Universal Music released the song to French radio stations on January 12, 2026, and to Italian radio on January 23. CD singles of "Opalite", available on Swift's online webstore, were distributed by February 16. Five versions of the song were also released as CD singles: an acoustic rendition by Swift, subtitled "Life is A Song", and four electronic dance music remixes by the English DJ Chris Lake, German DJ Bunt, English DJ Skream, and Austrian DJ Ely Oaks. Kelce, a fan of Lake, inspired Lake to collaborate with Swift on a remix of "Opalite". Rolling Stone described Lake's remix as a house track.

== Composition ==
"Opalite"
A sample of the refrain of "Opalite", featuring guitar jangles, bouncy bass, and disco beats

"Opalite" is a pop rock, soft rock, and synth-pop song, with influences of Europop, Eurodance, doo-wop, and disco. It was written and produced by Swift, Max Martin, and Shellback. It opens with a looping, acoustic guitar jangle, and grows into a contrasting disco refrain, supported by a bouncy bass, layered harmonies, and vintage swing beats. The chorus features a three-note progression. Critics compared the song to the music of ABBA, the Ronettes, and Fleetwood Mac. Anna Gaca from Pitchfork described the track as a "stage adaptation" of Post Malone's "Circles" (2019) and Maroon 5's "Sugar" (2015). Molanphy referenced the Ronettes' "Be My Baby" (1963). Nicole Fell of The Hollywood Reporter compared the song's "dreaminess" to that of Swift's tenth studio album, Midnights (2022), while Tess Patton of TheWrap found it reminiscent of the "bubbly pop" in her fifth studio album, 1989 (2014). Others drew parallels with Swift's songs "Paper Rings" (2019) and "Message in a Bottle" (2021).

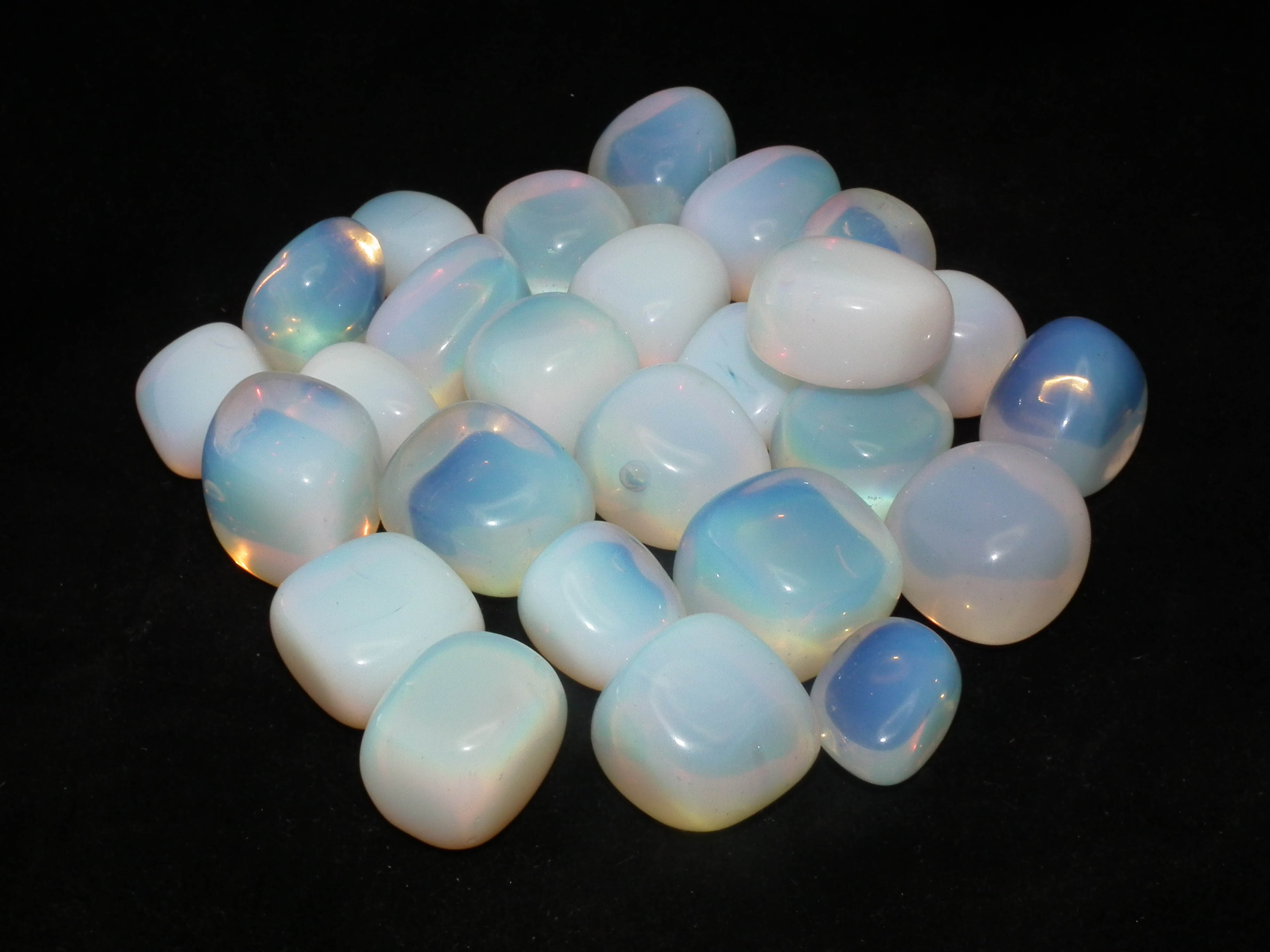
A cluster of opalites, the song's namesake

Lyrically, "Opalite" is a love song about Swift's romance with Kelce. The lyrics are mainly focused on their relationship and include references to both Swift's and Kelce's former relationships. In the first verse, she describes her past dating life, her habit of reminiscing on her ex-lovers, and her brother's advice. It is followed by a refrain that is words of comfort from her mother, Andrea. Swift reflects on Kelce's dating life in the second verse. In the refrain, Swift carries on her lyrical tradition of associating colors with emotions. She describes sadness and sorrow as "onyx night"—onyxes being a generally black-and-white group of gemstones, and equates happiness with an "opalite" sky—an iridescent pastel blue shade; this contrast evokes a symbolic transition to healing, as in dark clouds giving way to sunny skies. The bridge offers words of encouragement, describing loss and failure as steps towards freedom. People's Samantha Stutsman described the song as "a celebration of growth, self-forgiveness and the messy, beautiful journey of love." According to Collider's Isabella Soares, it "is a love song about surpassing romantic hardships alongside a person that brings you joy and stability."

== Critical reception ==
Critical reception of "Opalite" was positive, with emphasis on its uplifting and optimistic message. Its shimmering and "glossy" production drew plaudits. Writing for USA Today, Bryan West described the melody as being "as addictive as a narcotic", while Melissa Ruggeri deemed it the best song of 2025. Variety's Chris Willman called the refrain "a sheer pheromone rush". According to Lauren Hague of Clash, "Opalite" is "destined to be a radio 'pop song of the summer' style hit", boasting an "infectious" hook and a "delightful" bridge that showcases Swift's upper-register vocals. Similarly, Kristen S. Hé of NME called the song a sweet, "obvious radio single". Soares described it as a catchy, bubbly, danceable track. According to Alan Light from Esquire, "Opalite" is a "straight-up bop, dizzy in love".

BBC News's Mark Savage praised the song's "breezy" composition, describing it as "unfurling like a blossoming romance". Maria Sherman of the Associated Press admired the swooning, "addictive and idiosyncratic Swiftisms" the song offers, claiming "Opalite" would not work for any other artist. She noted that the song has an "almost iridescent" sonic quality, while Anna Gaca of Pitchfork thought the song is theatrical in sound.

Several critics considered the song a highlight of The Life of a Showgirl. The Los Angeles Times critic Mikael Wood liked its "gorgeous", laid-back sound. Durva More of The Economic Times called "Opalite" a stand-out for its themes of emotional growth and self-forgiveness, and for a display of Swift's hopeful side. Caroline Darney of For the Win placed it number one in their ranking of the album's 12 songs, praising its joyous and "sweet" atmosphere. Molanphy called it the album's "perkiest ditty". Jason Lipshutz of Billboard ranked it 8th in his list, describing it as a "slick, shimmying" track with a lively, singable refrain. Prestige Hong Kong's Bushra Jung also ranked it 8th, calling it an "infectiously, contagiously happy" song with an explosive, thumping refrain. Harper's Bazaar editors ranked it the 6th-best song on the album. Willman considered "Opalite" as a surprising change of pace within the album. Gaca picked "Opalite" as one of the album's best songs, describing it as "a better-days-ahead anthem".

The song also received a few mixed reviews. Carl Wilson of Slate named the song a near-perfect "classic Max Martin banger", but preferred its refrains and bridge over the "dull" verses. Wren Graves of Consequence quipped that "Opalite" has a "fine but forgettable" refrain. Soares of Collider placed the song 9th in her ranking of the album's 12 songs, finding its lyricism subpar for Swift's songwriting acumen.

== Commercial performance ==
Upon the album's release, "Opalite" topped the charts in the Philippines as the second song from The Life of a Showgirl to reach number one, following the lead single "The Fate of Ophelia". The song reached the top 10 in several countries across the globe, including Australia, Belgium, Malaysia, the Netherlands, Norway, Singapore, Switzerland, the United Arab Emirates, and Vietnam. It landed in the top 20 in Brazil, France, Mexico, Poland, Spain, and Taiwan. The single has been certified diamond in Brazil, double platinum in Canada and New Zealand, and platinum in Australia, Belgium, France, Portugal, and the United Kingdom.

In the United States, "Opalite" debuted at number two on the Billboard Hot 100 chart upon the album's release. It spent 19 weeks on the chart and 14 weeks in the top 10 before rising to number one following its single release, becoming Swift's 14th number-one song in the country. The Life of a Showgirl became her first album since 1989 (2014) to produce multiple number ones. Swift broke the record for the most number-one songs by an artist in the 2020s and tied the Barbadian singer Rihanna for the most number-one songs in the 21st century. Molanphy remarked that none of Swift's previous singles had lasted as long on the charts as "Opalite" did before reaching number one in the United States. The song reached number one on the Pop Airplay and Adult Pop Airplay charts, marking Swift's record-extending 15th number-one single on both. The single also became her record-extending 31st number one on the Digital Song Sales chart.

In the United Kingdom, "Opalite" had debuted at number two on the UK Singles Chart and vaulted to number one following the music video's release. It marked Swift's sixth number-one song in the UK and made The Life of a Showgirl her first album to produce two number-one songs in the country. In Germany, "Opalite" debuted at number three on the singles chart upon the album's release and topped the charts following its single release. It became Swift's second number-one song in Germany and the second song from The Life of a Showgirl to reach number one on the chart, following the lead single "The Fate of Ophelia".

== Music video ==
=== Production and release ===
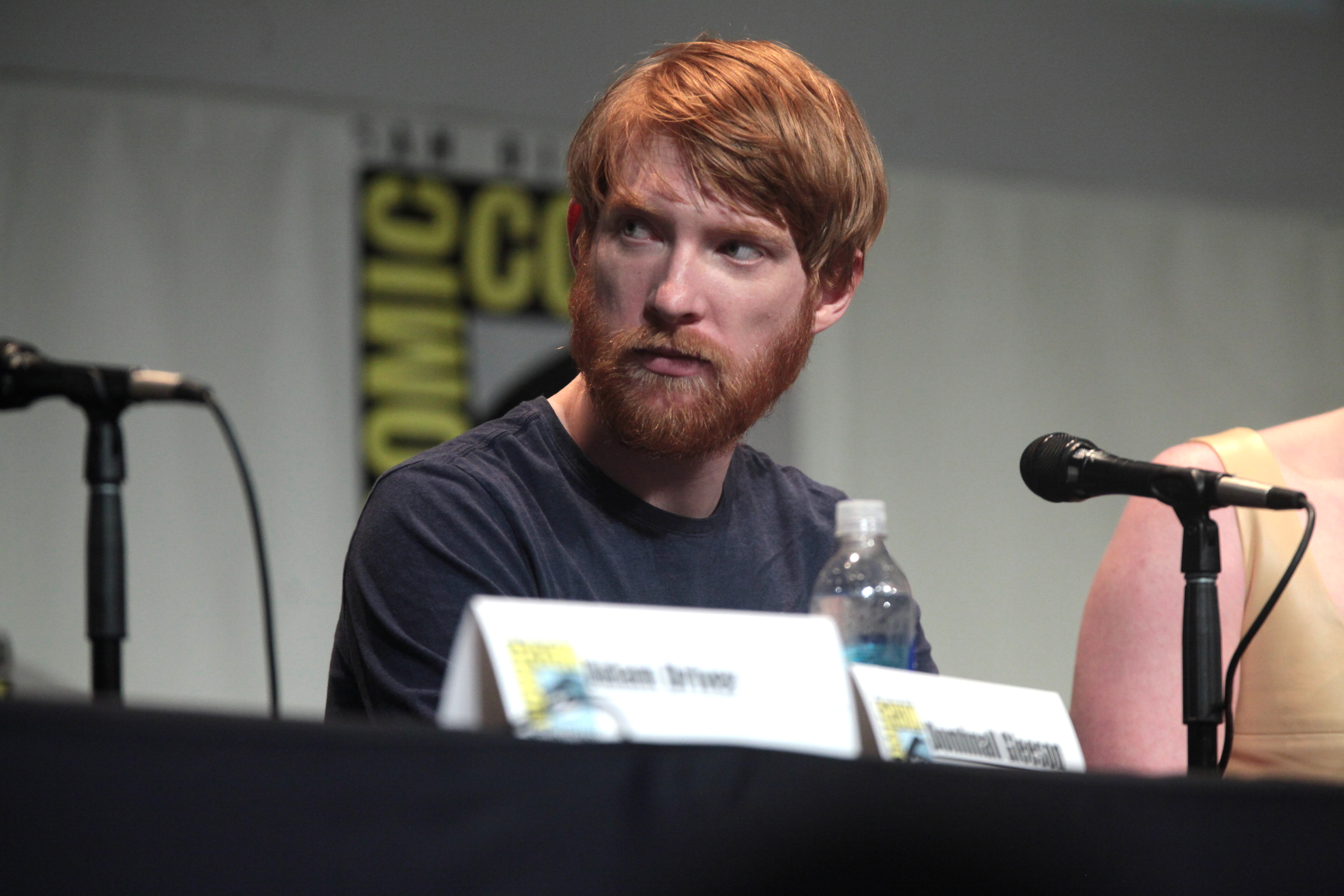
The Irish actor Domhnall Gleeson plays Swift's love interest in the "Opalite" music video.

Swift wrote and directed the music video for "Opalite". She collaborated with the cinematographer Rodrigo Prieto, who shot the video on film, and the choreographer Mandy Moore, who choreographed Swift's Eras Tour and "The Fate of Ophelia" music video. Swift conceived the video following her appearance on the talk show The Graham Norton Show in October 2025, where she was a guest alongside Domhnall Gleeson, Lewis Capaldi, Cillian Murphy, Greta Lee, and Jodie Turner-Smith. During the broadcast, Gleeson jokingly expressed interest in appearing in one of Swift's music videos, which inspired her to conceptualize the video featuring all her fellow guests, along with the host Graham Norton. Swift sent Gleeson the script for the music video within a week, featuring him in the starring role. The video also features cameo appearances from Swift's backup dancers from her 2023–2024 concert tour, the Eras Tour, as well as Swift's brother Austin.

The music video was released on Apple Music and Spotify Premium on February 6, 2026, and on YouTube two days later. UK politician Sarah Jones, the Member of Parliament for Croydon West, shared on social media that some scenes of the video were filmed at the Whitgift Centre, a shopping complex in her constituency. People reported that Swift transformed the "run-down" mall for the music video, using production to restore it to a 1990s visual. Two behind-the-scenes (as extended versions of the music video) were released on Apple Music and Spotify Premium on February 13.

=== Synopsis ===
The video stars Swift and Gleeson as a pair of wallflowers bonded with inanimate objects before they find each other and forge a new bond with the help of a magical spray potion called "Opalite". It is set in the 1990s.

The 1990s-inspired music video of "Opalite" incorporates an infomercial that advertises a fictional potion of the same name (pictured) that can fix all types of relationships.

Swift watches an infomercial promoting the potion, advertised and voiced by Murphy. The spray is claimed to provide companionship and transform "crappiness into happiness". The video then shows Swift as a "lonely woman" who is attached to her Pet Rock. She makes friendship bracelets, performs karaoke, and goes to bars with the unresponsive rock. Lee appears as an indie rock singer-songwriter on MTV, while Turner-Smith plays an aerobics instructor. Gleeson is shown as a "lonely man" who is in an abusive relationship with his pet cactus, which repeatedly injures him despite his best efforts. He places an order for "Opalite" and sprays it on the cactus, while Swift sprays herself at the same time, prompting her to appear in his house magically. Gleeson helps Swift, who is drenched in the potion, clean up in his bathtub.

Swift and Gleeson begin a relationship and are shown going on several dates, including a visit to a shopping mall, where Capaldi's character photographs them. The couple run into the cactus, which gives them the finger, and the rock, which wears a "Fuck you, forever" bracelet. Norton plays a salesman for "Nope-alite", the second-best-selling spray and one that reverses the effects of "Opalite". Norton attempts to give Swift a free sample, but Gleeson stops him. The couple perform a choreographed number at a dance competition, where all the judges, including Kameron Saunders, score them a zero, which does not seem to bother Swift and Gleeson.

In the epilogue, the cactus and the rock get married after having met through "Opalite". The end credits feature clips from The Graham Norton Show episode that served as the catalyst for the video's production.

=== Reception ===
Maya Georgi of Rolling Stone described the music video as a funny, "silly but sweet" story. Mehera Bonner of Cosmopolitan dubbed it the "cutest romcom ever", while Mark Savage of BBC News called it a "hilarious" video. The Guardian's Ben Beaumont-Thomas described it as a "whimsical, fantastical video" with a retro 1990s aesthetic. Alyssa Bailey of Elle contrasted the "Opalite" video with that of "The Fate of Ophelia", saying the former focuses on "the search for love and connection—through a '90s lens", while the latter is an exploration of fame and female performers. Bailey also opined that the video's dance competition and mall trip depict "quintessential" romantic dates in the 1990s. Molanphy referred to the video as a "strenuously amusing clip". Callie Ahlgrim of Business Insider listed several visual and lyrical Easter eggs in the video, referencing her other songs such as "You Belong with Me" (2009), "Lover" (2019), "Mad Woman" (2020), "Bejeweled" (2022), "Father Figure", and "Ruin the Friendship" (both 2025). Alim Kheraj of The Independent criticized the video as "another vehicle for Swiftian world-building" that leans into commercial self-mythology more than artistic expression. Kheraj described Swift as an exceptional storyteller-cum-popstar who has resorted to insularity and "hollow" creativity with the video.

== Accolades ==
Accolades received by "Opalite"
Organization	Year (Note: Indicates the year of ceremony. Each year is linked to the article about the awards held that year, wherever possible.)	Category	Result	Ref.
AICP Awards	2026	AICP Post – Music Video	Nominated	
ASCAP Pop Music Awards	2026	Winning Songs	Won	
Grammy Awards	2027	Best Remixed Recording, Non-Classical (Note: For the Chris Lake remix.)	Pending	
MTV Video Music Awards	2026	Best Direction	Won	
UK Music Video Awards	2026	Best Production Design in a Video	Nominated	

== In popular culture ==
Upon the announcement of the tracklist of The Life of a Showgirl, Google searches for the word "opalite" increased. Following the song's release, it inspired a viral dance trend on social media, especially in the Philippines, where the track was viral on TikTok, YouTube, and Instagram, and those viral videos integrated the Filipino language. A surge in opal sales was reported, with Gina Vaynshteyn and Katie Ann Lehman of StyleCaster describing it as a "much deserved hype". In Latin America, social media users alleged that "Opalite" sampled "Dos Enamorados", a popular song recorded by several artists, including the Mexican singer Luis Miguel.

Some TikTok users accused Swift of racial insensitivity with the lyric "Sleepless in the onyx night, but now the sky is opalite", dubbing it an attack on Kelce's former girlfriend, the American social media influencer Kayla Nicole. The song's second verse features the lyric "you were in it for real, she was in her phone, and you were just a pose", which some listeners and critics also speculated to be about Nicole. Following the album's release, a resurfaced video on the Internet showed Kelce asking Nicole to "get off the phone". Subsequently, Nicole's social media posts were interpreted by media outlets as disses aimed at Kelce and Swift, while Nicole claimed they were inspired by her childhood friend named Taylor. After facing backlash from fans of Swift and Kelce, Nicole posted tweets such as "Protect black women. Respect black women." Swift's fans accused Nicole of hypocrisy, resurfacing her old tweets containing language widely described as racist, sexist, ableist, and homophobic. Nicole deleted the controversial tweets before fully deactivating her Twitter account.

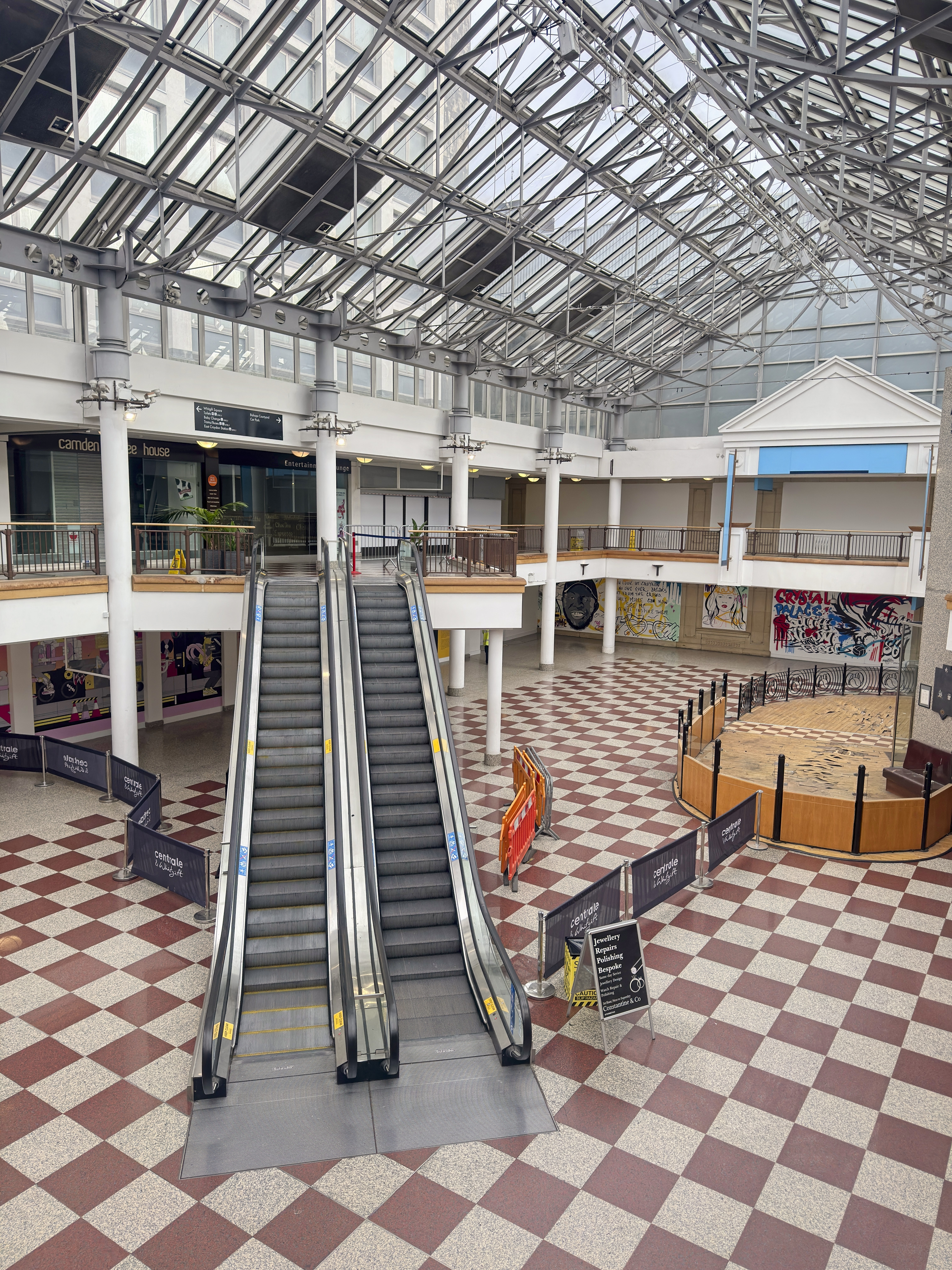
The section of the Whitgift Centre in Croydon, England, featured in the "Opalite" music video

A merchandise necklace inspired by "Opalite" became the subject of controversy after a viral TikTok video claimed it contained "Nazi" and "white supremacist" symbolism. Rolling Stone's Brian Hiatt said that some of the online discourse was "downright ludicrous, rooted in bad-faith misreadings of lyrics by listeners". In December 2025, media publications reported that the backlash was coordinated as part of a smear campaign targeting Swift. According to research by the behavioral intelligence platform GUDEA, a coordinated network of inauthentic accounts seeded and amplified social media posts falsely accusing her of endorsing far-right politics, Nazism, and white supremacism in her lyrics and album merchandise.

"Opalite" soundtracked the promotional video NBC began airing on February 17, 2026, in support of the Team USA women's figure skating trio (Amber Glenn, Alysa Liu, and Isabeau Levito), the Blade Angels, at the 2026 Winter Olympics. The video was narrated by Swift, who dubbed the athletes "showgirls on ice". The Whitgift Centre, the Croydon shopping mall that had been in a ruinous state, attracted renewed public interest after being featured in the "Opalite" music video. Fans flocked to the mall to take pictures and videos. According to Georgia Bell of The Standard, the mall's escalator seen in the video, on which Swift and Gleeson descend while holding hands, became a locally recognized landmark. Some locals felt that Swift had put Croydon back "on the map" while others took issue with journalists calling the mall "abandoned".

== Credits ==
Adapted from the liner notes of The Life of a Showgirl

Studios

- Produced at MXM Studios and Shellback Studios, Stockholm
- Recorded at Shellback Studios, Stockholm
- Mixed at MixStar Studios, Virginia Beach
- Mastered at Sterling Sound, Edgewater, New Jersey

Personnel

- Taylor Swift – lead vocals, songwriting, production, claps
- Max Martin – production, songwriting, programming, keyboards, claps, recording
- Shellback – production, songwriting, programming, bass, drums, guitar, keyboards, Omnichord, percussion, claps, recording
- Lasse Mårtén – recording, engineering
- Serban Ghenea – mixing
- Bryce Bordone – assistant mixing
- Randy Merrill – mastering

== Charts ==
=== Weekly charts ===
Chart performance
Chart (2025–2026)	Peak position
Argentina Hot 100 (Billboard)	17
Argentina Airplay (Monitor Latino)	12
Australia (ARIA)	2
Austria (Ö3 Austria Top 40)	2
Belarus Airplay (TopHit)	181
Belgium (Ultratop 50 Flanders)	3
Belgium (Ultratop 50 Wallonia)	3
Bolivia Airplay (Monitor Latino)	8
Brazil Hot 100 (Billboard)	20
Canada Hot 100 (Billboard)	2
Canada AC (Billboard)	3
Canada CHR/Top 40 (Billboard)	2
Canada Hot AC (Billboard)	2
Central America Anglo Airplay (Monitor Latino)	5
Chile Anglo Airplay (Monitor Latino)	7
Colombia Anglo Airplay (National-Report)	1
CIS Airplay (TopHit)	19
Costa Rica Airplay (FONOTICA)	16
Croatia (Billboard)	9
Croatia International Airplay (Top lista)	11
Czech Republic Airplay (ČNS IFPI)	6
Czech Republic Singles Digital (ČNS IFPI)	9
Denmark (Tracklisten)	3
Denmark Airplay (Tracklisten)	1
Dominican Republic Anglo Airplay (Monitor Latino)	5
Ecuador Anglo Airplay (Monitor Latino)	4
El Salvador Anglo Airplay (Monitor Latino)	5
Estonia Airplay (TopHit)	3
Finland (Suomen virallinen lista)	4
France (SNEP)	20
France Airplay (SNEP)	13
Germany (GfK)	1
Global 200 (Billboard)	2
Greece International (IFPI)	3
Guatemala Anglo Airplay (Monitor Latino)	5
Honduras Anglo Airplay (Monitor Latino)	1
Hong Kong (Billboard)	8
Hungary (Rádiós Top 40)	1
Hungary (Single Top 40)	21
Iceland (Tónlistinn)	6
India International (IMI)	2
India International (IMI)	2
Ireland (IRMA)	2
Israel (Mako Hitlist)	43
Italy (FIMI)	30
Japan Hot Overseas (Billboard Japan)	19
Latin America Anglo Airplay (Monitor Latino)	4
Latvia Airplay (LaIPA)	4
Latvia Streaming (LaIPA)	3
Lebanon (Lebanese Top 20)	5
Lithuania (AGATA)	9
Lithuania Airplay (TopHit)	4
Luxembourg (Billboard)	4
Malaysia (IFPI)	7
Malaysia International (RIM)	5
Malta Airplay (Radiomonitor)	1
Mexico (Billboard)	20
Middle East and North Africa (IFPI)	10
Netherlands (Dutch Top 40)	9
Netherlands (Single Top 100)	5
New Zealand (Recorded Music NZ)	2
Nicaragua Anglo Airplay (Monitor Latino)	2
Nigeria (TurnTable Top 100)	77
Nigeria International (TurnTable)	15
Nigeria Airplay (TurnTable)	46
North Macedonia Airplay (Radiomonitor)	3
Norway (IFPI Norge)	3
Panama Anglo Airplay (Monitor Latino)	4
Panama Streaming (PRODUCE)	97
Paraguay Airplay (Monitor Latino)	16
Peru (Billboard)	24
Philippines (Philippines Hot 100)	1
Poland (Polish Airplay Top 100)	4
Poland (Polish Streaming Top 100)	15
Portugal (AFP)	2
Puerto Rico Anglo Airplay (Monitor Latino)	4
Romania Airplay (TopHit)	38
Russia Airplay (TopHit)	50
Saudi Arabia (IFPI)	14
Serbia Airplay (Radiomonitor)	10
Singapore (RIAS)	3
Slovakia Airplay (ČNS IFPI)	1
Slovakia Singles Digital (ČNS IFPI)	14
Slovenia Airplay (Radiomonitor)	3
South Africa Airplay (TOSAC)	5
South Africa Streaming (TOSAC)	18
Spain (Promusicae)	11
Spain Airplay (Promusicae)	1
Suriname (Nationale Top 40)	3
Sweden (Sverigetopplistan)	4
Switzerland (Schweizer Hitparade)	2
Switzerland Airplay (Schweizer Hitparade)	2
Taiwan (Billboard)	11
Turkey International Airplay (Radiomonitor Türkiye)	5
Ukraine Airplay (TopHit)	12
United Arab Emirates (IFPI)	3
UK Singles (Official Charts)	1
UK Airplay (Radiomonitor)	1
Uruguay Anglo Airplay (Monitor Latino)	3
US Billboard Hot 100	1
US Adult Contemporary (Billboard)	4
US Adult Pop Airplay (Billboard)	1
US Pop Airplay (Billboard)	1
Venezuela Anglo Airplay (Monitor Latino)	8
Vietnam (IFPI)	9

=== Monthly charts ===
Monthly chart performance
Chart (2026)	Peak position
CIS Airplay (TopHit)	25
Estonia Airplay (TopHit)	4
Latvia Airplay (TopHit)	24
Lithuania Airplay (TopHit)	3
Paraguay Airplay (SGP)	69
Romania Airplay (TopHit)	43
Russia Airplay (TopHit)	60
Ukraine Airplay (TopHit)	62

=== Year-end charts ===
Year-end chart performance
Chart (2025)	Position
Australia (ARIA)	78
Estonia Airplay (TopHit)	121
Lithuania Airplay (TopHit)	172
Philippines (Philippines Hot 100)	69

== Certifications ==
List of certifications received by the single
Region	Certification	Certified units/sales
Australia (ARIA)	Platinum	70,000^{‡}
Austria (IFPI Austria)	Gold	15,000^{‡}
Belgium (BRMA)	Platinum	40,000^{‡}
Brazil (Pro-Música Brasil)	Diamond	160,000^{‡}
Canada (Music Canada)	2× Platinum	160,000^{‡}
Denmark (IFPI Danmark)	Gold	45,000^{‡}
France (SNEP)	Platinum	200,000^{‡}
Germany (BVMI)	Gold	300,000^{‡}
New Zealand (RMNZ)	2× Platinum	60,000^{‡}
Poland (ZPAV)	Gold	62,500^{‡}
Portugal (AFP)	Platinum	25,000^{‡}
Spain (Promusicae)	Gold	50,000^{‡}
Switzerland (IFPI Switzerland)	Gold	15,000^{‡}
United Kingdom (BPI)	Platinum	600,000^{‡}
Streaming
Central America (CFC)	Gold	3,500,000^{†}
^{‡} Sales+streaming figures based on certification alone.^{†} Streaming-only figures based on certification alone.

== Release history ==
Release formats and dates for "Opalite"
Region	Date	Format	Version	Label	Ref.
France	January 12, 2026	Radio airplay	Original	Universal	
Italy	January 23, 2026	Radio airplay	Original	Universal	
Various	February 6, 2026	Digital download	Original	Republic	
Various	February 6, 2026	Streaming	Original; music video	Republic	
Various	February 6, 2026	Streaming	Original; acoustic	Republic	
Various	February 9, 2026	7-inch single	Original; acoustic	Republic	
Various	February 13, 2026	Streaming	Original; extended music video part 1; extended music video part 2; music video	Republic	
United States	February 16, 2026	CD single	Original; instrumental	Republic	
United States	February 16, 2026	CD single	Acoustic; acoustic instrumental	Republic	
Various	February 16, 2026	Digital download	Acoustic	Republic	
Various	February 16, 2026	Digital download	Chris Lake remix	Republic	
Various	February 17, 2026	Digital download	Bunt remix	Republic	
Various	February 17, 2026	Digital download	Skream remix	Republic	
Various	February 17, 2026	Digital download	Ely Oaks remix	Republic	
Various	February 19, 2026	Streaming	Bunt remix	Republic	
Various	February 19, 2026	Streaming	Skream remix	Republic	
Various	February 19, 2026	Streaming	Ely Oaks remix	Republic	
Various	February 20, 2026	Streaming	Chris Lake remix	Republic	
United States	February 23, 2026	CD single	Chris Lake remix; original	Republic	
United States	February 23, 2026	CD single	Bunt remix; original	Republic	
United States	February 23, 2026	CD single	Skream remix; original	Republic	
United States	February 23, 2026	CD single	Ely Oaks remix; original	Republic	
