= Foreign Tongues =

Studio album by the Rolling Stones
- Released: 10 July 2026
- Recorded: 2019; 2021 (Note: The band's final session with Charlie Watts.); 2022–2023; 2025–2026
- Studios: Henson (Los Angeles); Metropolis (London)
- Genre: Rock and roll
- Length: 62:33
- Labels: Polydor; Capitol
- Producer: Andrew Watt

The Rolling Stones chronology
Welcome to Shepherd's Bush (2024)	Foreign Tongues (2026)

The Rolling Stones studio album chronology
Hackney Diamonds (2023)	Foreign Tongues (2026)

Singles from Foreign Tongues
- 1. "In the Stars" Released: 5 May 2026; 2. "Jealous Lover" Released: 25 June 2026; 3. "Mr. Charm" Released: 1 October 2026

Singles from Foreign Tongues, Loose Lips
- 1. "Who You Callin' Crazy" Released: 21 October 2026

Foreign Tongues is the twenty-fifth British and the twenty-seventh American studio album by the English rock band the Rolling Stones, released on 10 July 2026. Produced by Andrew Watt, the album features musical contributions from Steve Jordan, Darryl Jones, Steve Winwood, Robert Smith, Paul McCartney, Benmont Tench, Bruno Mars, and Chad Smith, among others. It also features a song recorded with Charlie Watts prior to his death.

The lead single, "In the Stars", was released through YouTube and streaming services on 5 May 2026 backed with "Rough and Twisted", which had previously been released only in extremely limited quantities as a physical 12-inch single several weeks earlier under the pseudonym of The Cockroaches, which the band had occasionally used in the 1970s to perform secret shows at smaller venues. A second single, "Jealous Lover", was released on 25 June, backed with "Divine Intervention".

Foreign Tongues was nominated for a Grammy Award for Best Rock Album. Additionally, "In the Stars" was nominated for a Grammy Award for Best Rock Song.

== Background and releases ==
Foreign Tongues is produced by Andrew Watt. Ronnie Wood first confirmed in late September 2025 that fans would be getting a new Rolling Stones album when he told UK publication The Sun, "Yes, you will be getting a new album next year. It is done." Reports dispelled rumours that it will be their last album, and asserted that the band have written at least 10 more songs for an album after it. The album was first teased as part of a marketing campaign for the single "Rough and Twisted", credited to pseudonym The Cockroaches, which was released on 11 April 2026, including only 1,000 vinyl copies to select records stores. A number of publications had also erroneously announced in the days leading up to its release that a song entitled "Mr. Charm" was rumoured to be released as the lead single for a new Rolling Stones album on 11 April 2026. Of the single, Will Hodgkinson of The Times stated that it had "a killer riff, a rambunctious harmonica solo from Mick Jagger, a devil-may-care spirit and the feeling that, six decades on from first crawling out of a notoriously squalid flat in Edith Grove, southwest London, to play the blues in smoke-clogged pubs and clubs along the Surrey Delta, the Rolling Stones are still a chaotic bar band forever on the verge of collapse, happiest in the most low-down dives."

The album primarily consists of new material, with four compositions recorded during the band's last album, Hackney Diamonds, including "Covered In You". The album includes material from band's final session with drummer Charlie Watts in 2021, as confirmed by Jagger at a press conference hosted by the band in New York City. On 25 April 2026, the band posted 20 photographs onto their official Facebook page taken in different countries showing street views with posters announcing the words Foreign Tongues written in different languages, which was later to be revealed as the title of their new studio album. On 2 May 2026, the album's front cover was unveiled, a 2025 painting by American painter Nathaniel Mary Quinn entitled Trinity showing Wood, Richards, and Jagger's "faces seem[ing] to merge into one". The next day, the band teased further details to be released on 5 May.

On 5 May 2026, the band confirmed that Foreign Tongues would be released on 10 July 2026, also launching the album's first single, "In the Stars", on YouTube and other streaming services, and also included the complete audio version of "Rough and Twisted" included on "In the Stars" three and a half weeks after its physical release. The band released a music video for "In the Stars", featuring Odessa A'zion, on 14 May 2026. The album features guest appearances by Paul McCartney, Robert Smith (the Cure), Chad Smith (Red Hot Chili Peppers), and Steve Winwood and Bruno Mars. The band's recording with Watts occurred during a session in Los Angeles shortly before his death in 2021. Several tracks included on Hackney Diamonds were recorded during the same Los Angeles sessions.

On 14 October 2026, it was announced that Foreign Tongues, Loose Lips, a special edition of the album (available on 1LP, including the original album on CD, or deluxe 2CD edition housed in a six-panel digisleeve with a 16-page booklet) featuring five new "blues and country" tracks recorded during the album sessions: "Where There's a Will", "Who You Callin' Crazy", "Human Tide", "Bad Luck Hideaway", and "She Still Comes Around" would be released on 27 November 2026.

== Artwork ==
The album's cover art is a 2025 pastel drawing by American artist Nathaniel Mary Quinn, whose work has been described as "fractured, dreamlike portraits [which] assemble identity from overlapping memories, emotions, and experiences rather than conventional likeness". Entitled Trinity, it consists of a composite, collage-like surrealist portrait of the three bandmembers' faces "seem[ing] to merge into one". The artwork was made under the art direction of Portuguese illustrator Bráulio Amado and English art director and visual artist Mat Maitland. Possibly inspired by the art of British painter Francis Bacon, it is reported to be reminiscent of a "better version of the cover to Metallica's 2016 album Hardwired... to Self-Destruct". The artwork has met with a divided reception, with Euronews dismissing it as "retina punishing".

== Critical reception ==
Professional ratings
Aggregate scores
Source	Rating
AnyDecentMusic?	7.1/10
Metacritic	75/100
Review scores
Source	Rating
The Arts Desk	4/5 stars
Classic Rock	3.5/5 stars
The Guardian	4/5 stars
The Independent	4/5 stars
The Irish Times	4/5 stars
Mojo	3/5 stars
Pitchfork	6.1/10
Rolling Stone	4/5 stars
The Telegraph	5/5 stars
The Times	5/5 stars
Uncut	4/5 stars

According to the review aggregator Metacritic, Foreign Tongues received "generally favorable reviews" based on a weighted average score of 75 out of 100 from 19 critic scores. The review aggregator AnyDecentMusic? gave it a weighted average score of 7.1 out of 10 from 22 critic scores. Rather than being a nostalgic retread, Dave Simpson's review in The Guardian described Foreign Tongues as "a thoroughly modern-sounding, occasionally political record that has the band confronting the world around them and their remaining time within it". Simpson highlighted the tracks "Mr. Charm" and "Covered in You" for their railing against "mad mogul Mr Musk" and autocrats respectively. Kory Grow of Rolling Stone stated the album "continue[s] their late-career winning streak", finding it to be superior to Hackney Diamonds. Grow praised the record for being "more guitar-centric and holistically Stones-y" than its predecessor, stating that while the production is "a little overly slick at times", it mostly "stays faithful to the Stones' signature sound, or at least Watts' idea of how the Stones should sound".

The Telegraph's Neil McCormick awarded the album five stars out of five, finding it contains "more than enough vitality, wit, richness, energy and joy on offer here to make the case that rock 'n' roll still rules in the modern pop firmament, and the Stones remain its greatest advocates." Alex Flood of the NME found the album to be "a cool, confident compendium of everything the band have done so far", and commended Jagger's vocal performances as well as the record's "fresh and refined" songs. Danny Eccleston of Mojo called the album a "rousing and varied experience with plenty of trademark Stones action and only a handful of caveats". Eccleston did criticize the record's "loud and busy" production, as well as some songs which he found were "reaching for a modern airplay hit", but found these to be offset by "key moments when the Stones' soul shines through". Soundwaves contributor Jason Landry wrote, "The Rolling Stones defy the calendar with a raw, timeless surge of blues-rock that honors their deepest roots while proving their signature swagger remains entirely untouched by time."

Conversely, Paste writer Grant Sharples gave the album a D+ rating and denounced Watt's production, finding its "pristine polish sands down the edges and defangs the Stones' guitar solos", while the "shambolic rowdiness that defines the band's best work is almost entirely absent". Sharples was also critical of the band members' performances and the album's runtime, ultimately deeming the record to be "impulsive and haphazard" while sounding like a group of outtakes from Hackney Diamonds. Steve Horowitz of PopMatters gave the album a score of 5 out of 10, feeling it "reveal[s] their songs and talents are not what they used to be" and lamenting that "whatever special songwriting and performance sparks they had once [have] vanished". While Horowitz notes that the record "may please some Rolling Stones fans, as the individual members share inspired moments", he opines that "it is doubtful this album will attract new fans".

== Commercial performance ==
In the United Kingdom, Foreign Tongues debuted at number one on the Official Albums Chart, selling 38,016 copies in its first week. The album marks The Rolling Stones' 15th number-one album in the UK, tying the Beatles as the second artist with the most number-one albums, behind only Robbie Williams, who has 16.

In the United States, the album debuted at number seven on the US Billboard 200, earning 54,000 album-equivalent units, calculated from 4.48 million on-demand streams and 49,000 pure album copies. Foreign Tongues marks the band's 39th top 10-charting album on the Billboard 200. The album was the best-selling album of the week.

== Track listing ==
All tracks are written by Jagger–Richards, except where noted.

Foreign Tongues track listing
No.	Title	Writer(s)	Length
1.	"Rough and Twisted"		4:40
2.	"In the Stars"		4:13
3.	"Jealous Lover"		3:50
4.	"Mr. Charm"		4:34
5.	"Divine Intervention"		4:46
6.	"Ringing Hollow"		5:18
7.	"Never Wanna Lose You"	Jagger–Richards; Matt Clifford	4:31
8.	"Hit Me in the Head"		2:57
9.	"You Know I'm No Good"	Amy Winehouse	4:54
10.	"Some of Us"		4:01
11.	"Covered in You"	Jagger–Richards; Clifford	4:32
12.	"Side Effects"	Jagger–Richards; Andrew Watt	4:35
13.	"Back in Your Life"	Jagger–Richards; Watt	6:13
14.	"Beautiful Delilah"	Chuck Berry	3:29
Total length:			62:33

iTunes Store bonus track
No.	Title	Writer(s)	Length
15.	"Bad Luck Hideaway"	Jagger–Richards; Watt	3:50
Total length:			66:23

Foreign Tongues, Loose Lips bonus tracks (released on 27 November 2026)
No.	Title	Writer(s)	Length
15.	"Where There's a Will"
16.	"Who You Callin' Crazy"	Jagger–Richards	4:09
17.	"Human Tide"
18.	"Bad Luck Hideaway"	Jagger–Richards; Watt	3:50
19.	"She Still Comes Around"

== Video releases ==
Several of the tracks were supported by video releases for such songs as "Mr Charm" and "Jealous Lover".

== Personnel ==
Credits are adapted from liner notes and Apple Music credits:

=== The Rolling Stones ===
- Mick Jagger – lead vocals (except 10), backing vocals (except 13–14), electric guitar (1–2, 4–8, 11), acoustic guitar (2, 5, 6, 11, 14), harmonica (1, 8–9, 11), percussion (4-5, 7, 12)
- Keith Richards – electric guitar (all tracks), acoustic guitar (4, 9–10), backing vocals (2, 6, 8, 11–12, 14–15), piano (8), lead vocals (10, 15)
- Ronnie Wood – electric guitar (except 14), bass guitar (1–2), background vocals (4, 10)

=== Additional musicians ===
- Steve Jordan – drums (1–7, 9–13), percussion (4, 9)
- Andrew Watt – electric guitar (1–4, 9, 11, 13), background vocals (1, 2, 5, 7, 9, 10, 12, 15), percussion (2, 8, 11–13), acoustic guitar (3, 12, 13), piano (3, 4, 9), synthesizer (3, 5, 7, 12), bass guitar (8)
- Matt Clifford – piano (1, 2, 11, 15), organ (1), synthesizer (3, 11), Rhodes (9, 11)
- James King – tenor saxophone (1, 5, 9, 13), alto saxophone (5, 13), baritone saxophone (9)
- Courtney Pine – saxophone (16)
- Ben Waters – piano (1)
- Benmont Tench – organ (2, 10, 15), piano (15)
- Darryl Jones – bass guitar (3–7, 9, 10, 12, 13)
- Steve Winwood – organ (3–6, 9, 12, 13, 15), Rhodes (3, 7), piano (5–7, 10, 12, 13)
- Naarai Jacobs – background vocals (4, 13)
- Porcha Clay – background vocals (13)
- Robert Smith – electric guitar (5), background vocals (7), synthesizer (7)
- Ron Blake – trumpet (5, 9, 13), flugelhorn (13)
- Bruno Mars – cowbell (7)
- Charlie Watts – drums (8, 15)
- Paul McCartney – bass guitar (11)
- Chad Smith – concert bass drum (14)

=== Technical ===
- Andrew Watt – production, engineering (all tracks); mixing (14)
- Don Was – additional production (8)
- Paul Lamalfa – engineering (all tracks), mixing (14)
- Marco Sonzini – engineering (1–7, 9–13), additional engineering (8)
- Matt Clifford – engineering (8), pre-production (1–13)
- Krish Sharma – engineering (8)
- Lars Fox – additional engineering (1–13)
- Joe Brice – engineering assistant
- Joe Dougherty – engineering assistant (1, 2, 11)
- Kelsey Porter – engineering assistant (1, 2, 11)
- Tommy Turner – engineering assistant (1, 2, 11)
- Alex Kalteziotis – engineering assistant (1–13)
- Harpaal Sanghera – additional engineering (3–7, 9, 10, 12, 13)
- Mollie Crammond – additional engineering (3–7, 9, 10, 12, 13)
- Dani Perez – additional engineering (8, 11, 12)
- Rich Evatt – additional engineering (11)
- Lawrence Adams – additional engineering (13), studio personnel (5–12)
- Serban Ghenea – mixing
- Bryce Bordone – mixing assistant
- Randy Merrill – mastering
- Andrew Koenig – studio personnel (5–14)
- Dom Faccini – studio personnel (5–14)
- Laura Ramsay – studio personnel (5–14)
- Pia Squillino – studio personnel (5–14)
- Pierre de Beauport – studio personnel (5–14)
- Ryan Bullington – studio personnel (5–14)
- Tavish Westwood – studio personnel (5–14)
- Tony Russell – studio personnel (5–14)
- Anna Donarski – studio personnel (5–13)
- Artie Smith – studio personnel (5–13)
- Marc Van Gool – studio personnel (5–13)

== Charts ==
=== Weekly charts ===
Weekly chart performance
Chart (2026)	Peak position
Argentine Albums (CAPIF)	1
Australian Albums (ARIA)	2
Austrian Albums (Ö3 Austria)	1
Belgian Albums (Ultratop Flanders)	1
Belgian Albums (Ultratop Wallonia)	1
Canadian Albums (Billboard)	7
Croatian International Albums (HDU)	1
Czech Albums (ČNS IFPI)	10
Danish Albums (Hitlisten)	2
Dutch Albums (Album Top 100)	1
Finnish Albums (Suomen virallinen lista)	1
French Albums (SNEP)	1
French Rock & Metal Albums (SNEP)	1
German Albums (Offizielle Top 100)	1
German Rock & Metal Albums (Offizielle Top 100)	1
Greek Albums (IFPI)	1
Hungarian Albums (MAHASZ)	16
Irish Albums (Official Charts)	8
Italian Albums (FIMI)	2
Japanese Albums (Oricon)	5
Japanese Combined Albums (Oricon)	5
Japanese Hot Albums (Billboard Japan)	42
Japanese Rock Albums (Oricon)	1
New Zealand Albums (RMNZ)	2
Norwegian Albums (IFPI Norge)	1
Norwegian Rock Albums (IFPI Norge)	1
Polish Albums (ZPAV)	1
Portuguese Albums (AFP)	3
Scottish Albums (Official Charts)	1
Slovak Albums (ČNS IFPI)	38
Spanish Albums (Promusicae)	2
Swedish Albums (Sverigetopplistan)	1
Swiss Albums (Schweizer Hitparade)	1
UK Albums (Official Charts)	1
US Billboard 200	7
US Top Rock & Alternative Albums (Billboard)	3

=== Monthly charts ===
Monthly chart performance
Chart (2026)	Position
Croatian International Vinyl Albums (HDU)	2
Japanese Albums (Oricon)	16
Japanese Rock Albums (Oricon)	1

== Certifications ==
Region	Certification	Certified units/sales
United Kingdom (BPI)	Silver	60,000^{‡}
^{‡} Sales+streaming figures based on certification alone.
