= MTV Video Music Award for Best Long Form Video =

Annual music video award

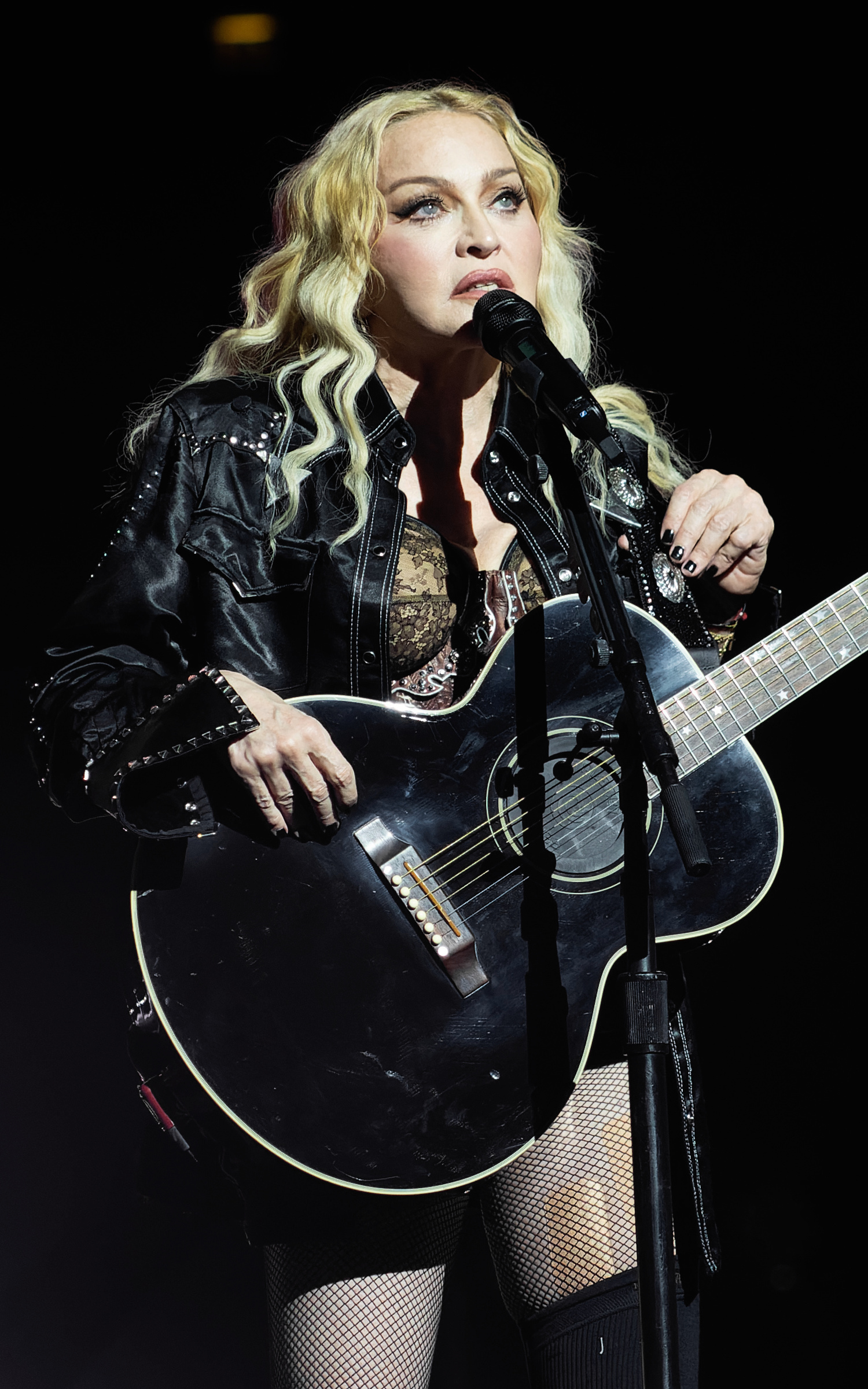
- Madonna is the most recent recipient for Confessions II - The Film.
- Awarded for: Long form music video
- Country: United States
- Presented by: MTV
- First award: 1991
- Currently held by: Madonna – Confessions II – The Film (2026)

Highlights
- Most nominations: Madonna (3)
- Website: VMA website

The MTV Video Music Award for Best Long Form Video was first given out in 1991. It was re-introduced in 2016 as Breakthrough Long Form Video and in 2022 under the original name.

== Recipients ==
Year	Winner(s)	Nominees	Ref.
1991	Madonna – The Immaculate Collection	Aerosmith – Things That Go Pump in the Night; Peter Gabriel – P.O.V.; R.E.M. – Tourfilm	
1992 – 2015	—N/a		
2016	Beyoncé – Lemonade	Justin Bieber – Purpose: The Movement; Chris Brown – Royalty; Florence + The Machine – The Odyssey; Troye Sivan – Blue Neighbourhood Trilogy	
2017 – 2021	—N/a		
2022	Taylor Swift – All Too Well: The Short Film	Billie Eilish – Happier Than Ever: A Love Letter to Los Angeles; Foo Fighters – Studio 666; Madonna – Madame X; Kacey Musgraves – Star-Crossed; Olivia Rodrigo – Driving Home 2 U	
2023 – 2024	—N/a		
2025	Ariana Grande – Brighter Days Ahead	Bad Bunny – Debí Tirar Más Fotos (Short Film); Damiano David – Funny Little Stories; Mac Miller – Balloonerism; Miley Cyrus – Something Beautiful; The Weeknd – Hurry Up Tomorrow	
2026	Madonna – Confessions II – The Film	Charli XCX – Music, Fashion, Film; Ella Langley – "Choosin' Texas"; Gener8ion – "Storm" starring Yung Lean	
