= Storm (Gener8ion song) =

2026 single by Gener8ion featuring Yung Lean

Single by Gener8ion featuring Yung Lean

from the album Love & Tears
- Released: 24 April 2026
- Length: 6:22
- Label: Iconoclast
- Songwriters: Benoit Heitz; Canblaster; Jonatan Leandoer
- Producer: Gener8ion

Gener8ion singles chronology
| "Neo Surf" (2021) | "Storm" (2026) | "Love & Tears" (2026) |

Yung Lean singles chronology
| "Advent" (2025) | "Storm" (2026) | "Robotboy" (2026) |

Music video
- "Storm" starring Yung Lean on YouTube

"Storm" (also known as "Storm Pt. I & II") is a dual single by French producer Surkin (under his alias Gener8ion) featuring Swedish rapper Yung Lean. It was released on 24 April 2026 as the lead single for his first studio album under the alias Gener8ion, Love & Tears. A musical short film, directed by Romain Gavras and choreographed by Damien Jalet, was released on the same day. It received four nominations at the 2026 MTV Video Music Awards and five awards at the 2026 UK Music Video Awards, including Video of the Year. It was also nominated for Best Music Video at the 69th Annual Grammy Awards.

== Premise ==
Set in an all-boys British boarding school class of 2034, the film follows a disruptive and aggressive student and his sidekick, portrayed by Yung Lean and Alexander Hogg. The first part of the project depicts acts of rebellion and disorder among the students, while the second installment shifts toward a more stylized and euphoric tone centered on unity, music, and choreographed movement.

== Production ==
The music video for "Storm" was created by Gener8ion, the multimedia project of French producer and visual artist Surkin. The project was directed by Romain Gavras. Choreography for the production was developed by Damien Jalet.

The video was produced by Iconoclast, with production contributions from Maeva Tenneroni, Guillaume Le Gat, and Nicolas Galoux. Creative direction was provided by Surkin, while cinematography was handled by Lara Perotte and Matias Boucard.

The video was filmed at the school Collège Cardinal Mercier in Braine l'Alleud.

== Release and reception ==
Following its release, "Storm" attracted significant online attention and was widely discussed for the video's choreography and visual style. Writing for Man of Many, Elliot Nash described the project as a "controlled descent into chaos" and highlighted its depiction of institutional life, group dynamics, and synchronized dance sequences. The publication particularly noted the choreography by Damien Jalet, emphasizing the large-scale ensemble movement featured in the film’s concluding sequence.

Esquire compared the film's depiction of youth rebellion and disorder to works such as Bully, Skins, and Adolescence. The publication also noted the film's darker and more grounded visual style in contrast to the neon-influenced aesthetics of series such as Euphoria. Damien Jalet's choreography in "Storm II" was described as drawing from schoolboy chanting and locker-room behavior.

At the 2026 MTV Video Music Awards, the music video was nominated for Video of the Year, Best Choreography, Best Direction and Best Long Form Video. At the 2026 UK Music Video Awards, it was nominated for seven categories, later winning Video of the Year, Best Dance / Electronic Video – International, Best Performance in a Video, Best Casting in a Video and Best Choreography in a Video. It was also nominated for Best Music Video at the 34th Camerimage International Cinematography Festival and the 69th edition of the Grammy Awards.

== Track listing ==
All lyrics are written by Yung Lean.

"Storm" track listing
| No. | Title | Music | Length |
|---|---|---|---|
| 1. | "Storm I" | Benoit Heitz; Canblaster; Jonatan Leandoer | 3:29 |
| 2. | "Storm II" | Heitz; Leandoer | 2:53 |
| Total length: | | | 6:22 |

== Credits ==
Credits were adapted from Apple Music.

- Gener8ion – producer, composer
- Yung Lean – composer, lyricist
- Canblaster – composer
- Nathan Boddy – mixing engineer
- Lilian Nuthall – assistant mixing engineer
- Ben Matravers – assistant mixing engineer

== Charts ==
Weekly chart performance
| Chart (2026) | Peak position |
|---|---|
| Australia (ARIA) | 42 |
| Austria (Ö3 Austria Top 40) | 15 |
| Belgium (Ultratop 50 Wallonia) | 35 |
| Canada Hot 100 (Billboard) | 50 |
| Czech Republic Singles Digital (ČNS IFPI) | 37 |
| France (SNEP) | 48 |
| Germany (GfK) | 38 |
| Global 200 (Billboard) | 61 |
| Ireland (IRMA) | 23 |
| Kazakhstan Airplay (TopHit) | 74 |
| Latvia Streaming (LaIPA) | 9 |
| Lithuania (AGATA) | 11 |
| Luxembourg (Billboard) | 21 |
| Malta Airplay (Radiomonitor) | 19 |
| Norway (IFPI Norge) | 20 |
| Poland Streaming (OLiS) | 79 |
| Portugal (AFP) | 152 |
| Russia Streaming (TopHit) | 60 |
| Slovakia Airplay (ČNS IFPI) | 88 |
| Sweden (Sverigetopplistan) | 5 |
| Switzerland (Schweizer Hitparade) | 10 |
| UK Singles (Official Charts) | 37 |
| UK Independent (Official Charts) | 8 |
| US Billboard Hot 100 | 93 |
| US Hot Dance/Electronic Songs (Billboard) | 2 |
