= Opalite =

Trade name for opal and moonstone simulants

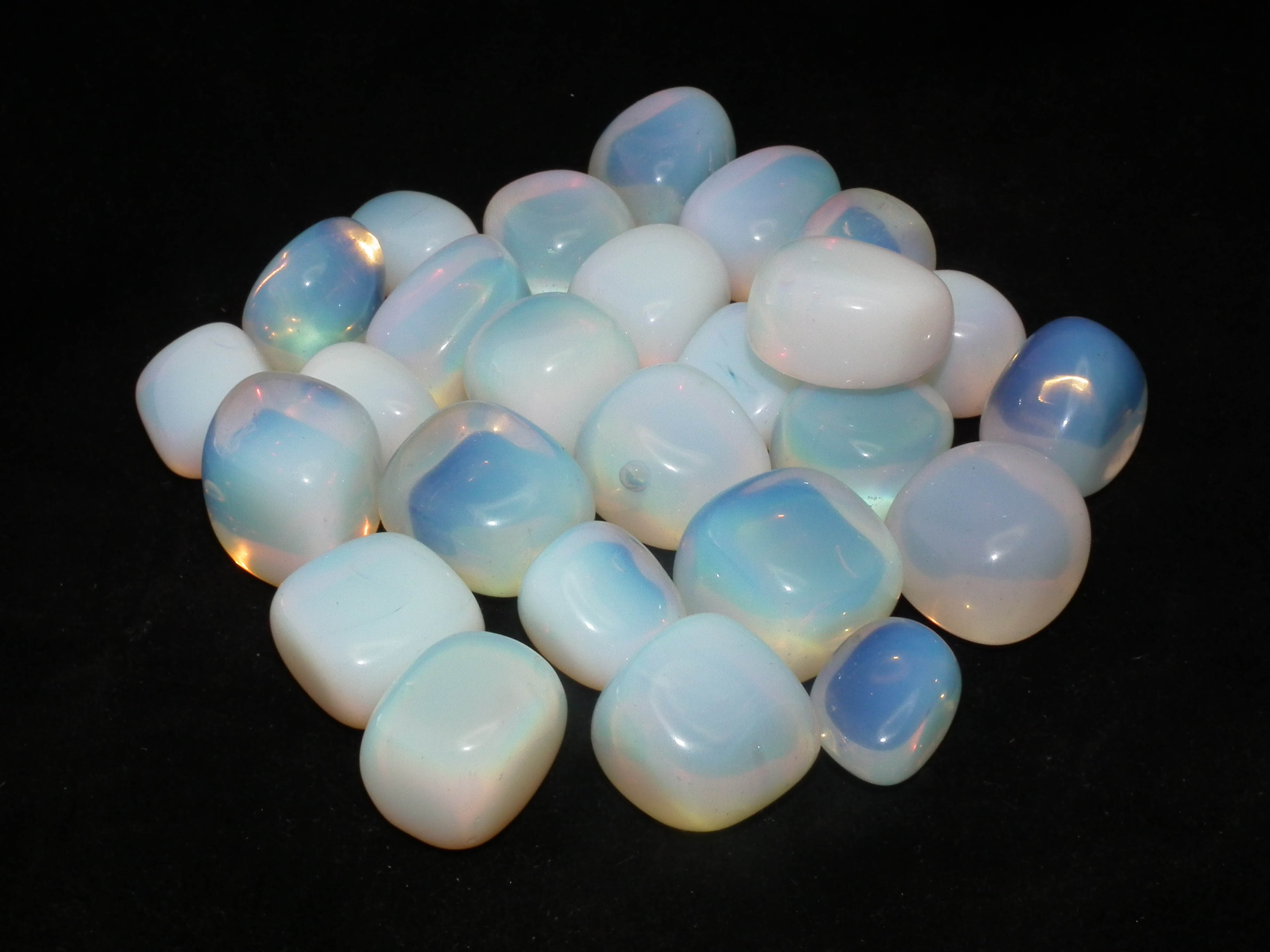
10–20 mm pieces of tumble-polished opalite, an artificial glass

Opalite is a generic term for synthetic opalescent glass and various opal and moonstone simulants. Other names for this glass product include argenon, sea opal, opal moonstone, and other similar names. It is also used to promote impure varieties of variously colored common opal.

Natural opalite (as opposed to the man-made opalite) shares the same basic chemical properties as opal. It is made of tiny spheres of silicon dioxide, which stack onto each other in a pyramid grid shape. This grid is what allows the cat's-eye effect to be displayed when the stone is cut into a ball.

When opalite glass is placed against a dark background, it appears to have a blue color. When placed against a light background, it is milky white with an orange or pink glow. Since it is glass, it may sometimes contain air bubbles, an after-effect of the forming process.

== Usages ==
Opalite is mainly used as a decorative stone and is usually sold either tumble polished or carved into decorative objects. Some sellers will sell opalite as opal or moonstone.
