= Homewrecker (Sombr song) =

Single by Sombr
- Released: February 5, 2026
- Genre: Indie pop
- Length: 3:29
- Label: SMB; Warner
- Songwriter: Shane Boose
- Producers: Sombr; Tony Berg

Sombr singles chronology
"12 to 12" (2025)	"Homewrecker" (2026)	"Potential" (2026)

Music video
- "Homewrecker" on YouTube

“Homewrecker” is a song by American singer-songwriter Sombr, released on February 5, 2026, under Warner Records and his own label, SMB. Sombr wrote the song entirely himself and co-produced it with Tony Berg. The track showcases Sombr’s musical style and songwriting abilities, further adding to his growing body of work.

"Homewrecker" peaked at number 15 on the Billboard Hot 100. Outside of the United States, "Homewrecker" peaked within the top ten of the charts in several countries, including in Australia, Ireland, Latvia, New Zealand, and the United Kingdom.

== Background and release ==
On February 4, 2026, Sombr posted a snippet of the song on his Instagram, captioned "homewrecker drops Thursday at 3 p.m. PST", alongside Milo Manheim and Quenlin Blackwell. The song marked his first release of 2026, following his 2025 singles "12 to 12" and "Undressed". Its release came shortly after his performance at the 68th Annual Grammy Awards on February 1.

== Composition ==
"Homewrecker" is an "upbeat pop song" in which Sombr addresses a love interest who is unavailable. In the song, he expresses that, despite not wanting to insult the partner of the love interest or interfere in their relationship, that he would be a better match.

== Commercial performance ==
"Homewrecker" marked Sombr's fifth entry on the Billboard Global 200, debuting at number 28 on the chart dated February 21, 2026, before reaching number 21 in its third week. On the Billboard Hot 100, the song debuted at number 31, and climbed to number 24 in its third week. The debut marked Sombr's highest first-week position on the Hot 100 to date; his previous entries, "Back to Friends", "12 to 12", and "Undressed", debuted at numbers 90, 95, and 96, respectively. The song also became his fourth top-ten entry on the Hot Rock & Alternative Songs chart, peaking at number three.

In Canada, "Homewrecker" debuted at number 25 on the Canadian Hot 100 in the same week as its US and Global 200 debuts, and entered the top 20 in its third week at number 18.

In the United Kingdom, "Homewrecker" debuted at number 14 on the UK Singles Chart on February 13, 2026 — for the week ending date February 19, 2026. "Homewrecker" later peaked at number four on the chart on April 17, 2026 — for the week ending April 23, 2026 — becoming Sombr's third top ten song in Britain after "Back to Friends" and "Undressed".

In Ireland, "Homewrecker" became the singer's fourth top ten single, peaking at number four on the Irish Singles Chart.

In Australia, "Homewrecker" entered the at number 18 on the ARIA Singles Chart dated February 16, 2026, and reached number six in its third week.

In New Zealand, "Homewrecker" debuted at number 26 on the New Zealand Singles Chart for the week beginning February 13, 2026, and peaked at number 10 the following week.

== Music video ==
The accompanying music video was released alongside the song on February 5, 2026, and was directed by Gus Black. Visually inspired by Western films, the video reflects the song's themes and depicts the singer caught in a "love triangle" with characters portrayed by media personality and model Quenlin Blackwell and actor Milo Manheim. Manheim serves as the director within the video. By the end of the video, Sombr and Blackwell's characters are shown falling in love, having earlier displayed "undeniable chemistry", while the "volatile director" is left without anyone to bond with.

== Charts ==
=== Weekly charts ===
Weekly chart performance for "Homewrecker"
Chart (2026)	Peak position
Australia (ARIA)	6
Australia Airplay (RCS)	1
Austria (Ö3 Austria Top 40)	20
Austria Airplay (IFPI)	9
Belarus Airplay (TopHit)	158
Belgium (Ultratop 50 Flanders)	1
Belgium (Ultratop 50 Wallonia)	3
Bolivia Airplay (Monitor Latino)	11
Canada Hot 100 (Billboard)	6
Canada AC (Billboard)	5
Canada CHR/Top 40 (Billboard)	2
Canada Hot AC (Billboard)	2
Canada Modern Rock (Billboard Canada)	18
CIS Airplay (TopHit)	34
Costa Rica Anglo Airplay (Monitor Latino)	8
Croatia International Airplay (Top lista)	9
Czech Republic Airplay (ČNS IFPI)	44
Czech Republic Singles Digital (ČNS IFPI)	36
Denmark (Tracklisten)	27
Denmark Airplay (Tracklisten)	4
Ecuador Anglo Airplay (Monitor Latino)	11
Estonia Airplay (TopHit)	4
Finland Airplay (Radiosoittolista)	34
France Airplay (SNEP)	54
Germany (GfK)	30
Germany Airplay (MusicTrace)	5
Global 200 (Billboard)	21
Greece International (IFPI)	74
Hungary (Editors' Choice Top 40)	15
Ireland (IRMA)	4
Italy Airplay (EarOne)	6
Japan Hot Overseas (Billboard Japan)	5
Kazakhstan Airplay (TopHit)	30
Latvia Airplay (LaIPA)	2
Lebanon (Lebanese Top 20)	8
Lithuania (AGATA)	25
Lithuania Airplay (TopHit)	3
Malta Airplay (Radiomonitor)	1
Mexico Anglo Airplay (Monitor Latino)	6
Netherlands (Dutch Top 40)	3
Netherlands (Single Top 100)	17
Netherlands Airplay (Dutch Charts)	4
New Zealand (Recorded Music NZ)	10
New Zealand Airplay (RCS)	9
Nicaragua Anglo Airplay (Monitor Latino)	4
Norway (VG-lista)	19
Norway Airplay (IFPI)	14
Philippines Hot 100 (Billboard Philippines)	50
Poland Airplay (OLiS)	16
Poland Streaming (OLiS)	70
Portugal (AFP)	109
Portugal Airplay (AFP)	2
Romania Airplay (TopHit)	177
Russia Airplay (TopHit)	68
Slovakia Airplay (ČNS IFPI)	33
Slovakia Singles Digital (ČNS IFPI)	44
Slovenia Airplay (Radiomonitor)	9
South Africa Airplay (TOSAC)	17
Spain Airplay (Promusicae)	12
Sweden (Sverigetopplistan)	22
Switzerland (Schweizer Hitparade)	28
Switzerland Airplay (MusicTrace)	14
UK Singles (Official Charts)	4
US Billboard Hot 100	15
US Adult Contemporary (Billboard)	17
US Adult Pop Airplay (Billboard)	3
US Dance Airplay (Billboard)	35
US Hot Rock & Alternative Songs (Billboard)	2
US Pop Airplay (Billboard)	2

=== Monthly charts ===
Monthly chart performance for "Homewrecker"
Chart (2026)	Peak position
CIS Airplay (TopHit)	36
Estonia Airplay (TopHit)	6
Kazakhstan Airplay (TopHit)	31
Latvia Airplay (TopHit)	14
Lithuania Airplay (TopHit)	6
Russia Airplay (TopHit)	72

== Certifications ==
Certifications for "Homewrecker"
Region	Certification	Certified units/sales
Australia (ARIA)	Platinum	70,000^{‡}
Austria (IFPI Austria)	Gold	15,000^{‡}
Canada (Music Canada)	2× Platinum	160,000^{‡}
New Zealand (RMNZ)	Platinum	30,000^{‡}
United Kingdom (BPI)	Platinum	600,000^{‡}
^{‡} Sales+streaming figures based on certification alone.

== Release history ==
Release dates and formats for "Homewrecker"
Region	Date	Format	Label	Ref.
Various	February 5, 2026	Digital download; streaming	SMB; Warner	
Italy	February 6, 2026	Radio airplay	Warner	
