= Jealous Lover (Rolling Stones song) =

Single by the Rolling Stones

from the album Foreign Tongues
- B-side: "Divine Intervention"
- Released: 25 June 2026
- Length: 3:50
- Label: Polydor
- Songwriter: Jagger–Richards
- Producer: Andrew Watt

The Rolling Stones singles chronology
"In the Stars" (2026)	"Jealous Lover" (2026)	"Mr. Charm" (2026)

Music video
- "Jealous Lover" on YouTube

"Jealous Lover" is a song by the English rock band the Rolling Stones, released as the second single from the band's twenty-fifth British and the twenty-seventh American studio album Foreign Tongues (2026), backed by "Divine Intervention" from the same album. "Jealous Lover", was released on 25 June. It features Steve Winwood on organ and Rhodes.

== Release and reception ==
"Jealous Lover" was released on 25 June 2026 as Foreign Tongues' second single, and was well received. In a review for Consequence, Chris Coplan wrote that on the track, "Mick Jagger spends most of the tune pushing the higher registers of his falsetto while the instrumental—which includes contributions from Steve Winwood and Andrew Watt — jams along." Blabbermouth notes the track "offers another compelling example of the band's remarkable ability to move effortlessly between musical styles.", they also write that it "combines infectious melodies, rich musicianship and sharp lyrical observations. Jagger delivers a pointed warning to an over-inquisitive lover, bringing humor, attitude and vivid imagery to the song's narrative." concluding by saying that ""Jealous Lover" highlights the chemistry and creativity that continue to define the Rolling Stones more than six decades into their career, blending classic influences with a fresh and contemporary approach." A music video directed by Chris Barrett and Luke Taylor was released and featured stars like Anya Taylor-Joy and Charles Melton.

== Credits and personnel ==
Credits adapted from Tidal:

The Rolling Stones

- Mick Jagger – lead and backing vocals
- Keith Richards – electric guitar
- Ronnie Wood – electric guitar

Additional personnel

- Andrew Watt – acoustic guitar, electric guitar, piano, synthesizer, engineer, producer
- Darryl Jones – bass
- Steve Jordan – drums and percussion
- Steve Winwood – organ, Rhodes
- Matt Clifford – synthesizer, pre-production

Technical

- Alex Kalteziotis – additional engineer
- Harpaal Sanghera – additional engineer
- Joe Brice – additional engineer
- Lars Fox – additional engineer
- Mollie Crammond – additional engineer
- Bryce Bordone – additional mixing engineer
- Marco Sonzini – engineer
- Paul Lamalfa – engineer
- John Hanes – immersive mixing engineer
- Randy Merrill – mastering engineer
- Serban Ghenea – mixing engineer
- Andrew Koenig – studio
- Anna Donarski – studio
- Artie Smith – studio
- Dom Faccini – studio
- Laura Ramsay – studio
- Marc Van Gool – studio
- Pia Squillino – studio
- Pierre de Beauport – studio
- Ryan Bullington – studio
- Tavish Westwood – studio
- Tony Russell – studio

== Charts ==
Chart performance
Chart (2026)	Peak position
Argentina Anglo Airplay (Monitor Latino)	12
Japan Hot 100 (Billboard)	92
Japan Rock Singles (Oricon)	7
Netherlands Airplay (Dutch Charts)	46
San Marino Airplay (SMRTV Top 50)	45
UK Singles Sales (Official Charts)	2
Uruguay Anglo Airplay (Monitor Latino)	13
