= Nathaniel Mary Quinn =

American artist

Nathaniel Mary Quinn is an American painter known for his collage-style composite portraits that feature disfigured faces.

== Early life ==
Quinn was born in Chicago, where he grew up in the Robert Taylor Homes on the South Side. In his ninth grade of high school, he was awarded a scholarship to attend the Culver Military Academy in Indiana. While he was at Culver, his mother, Mary, died. He later legally adopted the middle name Mary in her memory, so her name would appear on his degree.

== Career ==
In 2013, Quinn made his first major hit painting, Charles. It was the first he made with his distinct collage-inspired style. The painting was based on five photographs, which produced an amalgamation resembling the smirk of his long-lost brother, Charles.

The artwork was shown in a home-based art salon run by the mother of one of his students. It caught the attention of the executive director of the Museum of Contemporary African Diasporan Arts in Brooklyn, who displayed it in the museum's window.

In 2014, Quinn held his first solo show at Pace Gallery in London.

During the fall of 2018, Quinn's work was included in a group show at The Drawing Center. His first solo museum exhibition, This Is Life, was presented at the Madison Museum of Contemporary Art, Wisconsin, from December 2018 to March 2019.

His work is included in the collection of the Pérez Art Museum Miami, Whitney Museum of American Art, the Hammer Museum, the MOCA, and the Art Institute of Chicago.

In 2019, Quinn became represented by Gagosian.
