= In the Stars (Rolling Stones song) =

Single by The Rolling Stones

from the album Foreign Tongues
- B-side: "Rough and Twisted"
- Released: 5 May 2026
- Length: 4:13
- Label: Polydor
- Songwriter: Jagger–Richards
- Producer: Andrew Watt

The Rolling Stones singles chronology
"Satisfaction Skank" (2025)	"In the Stars" (2026)	"Jealous Lover" (2026)

Music video
- "In the Stars" on YouTube

"In the Stars" is a song by English rock band the Rolling Stones. It was released on 5 May 2026, as the first widely-released single from their twenty-fifth studio album Foreign Tongues (2026). The single release is backed by "Rough and Twisted", which had previously been distributed as a limited-release single to record stores, under the pseudonym The Cockroaches.

Upon release, "In the Stars" topped multiple vinyl sales charts in the UK. A music video directed by Francois Rousselet was created for the song, featuring de-aged versions of the band members created with deepfake technology.

== Overview ==
Upon its physical release, "In the Stars" topped the UK Official Vinyl Singles and Official Physical Singles charts and peaked at number two on the Official Singles Sales chart. A music video was created for the song, directed by Francois Rousselet, which depicted de-aged, deepfake versions of the band members at a house party with actress Odessa A'zion.

== Personnel ==
Personnel taken from the single's liner notes.

The Rolling Stones

- Mick Jagger – vocals, background vocals, electric guitar, acoustic guitar
- Keith Richards – electric guitar, background vocals
- Ronnie Wood – electric guitar, bass guitar

Additional musicians

- Steve Jordan – drums
- Andrew Watt – electric guitar, percussion, background vocals
- Matt Clifford – piano
- Benmont Tench – organ

Technical personnel

- Andrew Watt – producer, engineer
- Paul Lamalfa – engineer
- Marco Sonzini – engineer
- Lars Fox – additional engineer
- Joe Dougherty – assistant engineer
- Joe Brice – assistant engineer
- Kelsey Porter – assistant engineer
- Tommy Turner – assistant engineer
- Alex Kalteziotis – assistant engineer
- Serban Ghenea – mixing
- Bryce Bordone – mix assistant
- Randy Merrill – mastering

== Charts ==
Chart performance
Chart (2026)	Peak position
Argentina Anglo Airplay (Monitor Latino)	7
Austria Airplay (IFPI Austria)	35
Bolivia Airplay (Monitor Latino)	3
Colombia Anglo Airplay (Monitor Latino)	9
Croatia International Airplay (Top lista)	14
Czech Republic Modern Rock (ČNS IFPI)	5
Finland Airplay (Radiosoittolista)	87
Germany Airplay (BVMI)	70
Italy Airplay (EarOne)	41
Japan (Oricon)	30
Japan Hot 100 (Billboard)	37
Japan Rock Singles (Oricon)	4
Latvia Airplay (TopHit)	84
Netherlands Airplay (Dutch Charts)	25
New Zealand Hot Singles (RMNZ)	39
Norway Airplay (IFPI)	91
Portugal Airplay (AFP)	35
Switzerland Airplay (IFPI Schweiz)	37
UK Singles Sales (Official Charts)	2
UK Physical Singles Chart (Official Charts)	1
UK Vinyl Singles Chart (Official Charts)	1
Uruguay Anglo Airplay (Monitor Latino)	5
US Adult Alternative Airplay (Billboard)	14
US Rock & Alternative Airplay (Billboard)	42
