= Surkin =

French DJ and music producer (born 1985)

- Gener8ion in 2015

Background information
- Also known as: Gener8ion
- Born: Benoit Heitz; 1985 (age 40–41)
- Genres: French house; electro house; chiptune
- Years active: 2006–present
- Labels: Institubes; Marble; Ed Banger; EMI Music Japan; Iconoclast
- Website: gener8ion.world

Benoit Heitz (born 1985), known by his stage name Surkin, is a French musician, composer, record producer, DJ and art director. He is also known for his electronic music under the project name Gener8ion.

== Life and career ==
Surkin was born in Arles in the south of France. He studied contemporary art at Villa Arson in Nice before moving to Paris to start his music career.

He first gained attention in 2006 with his first releases on the French Institubes music label, DJ performances in clubs and music festivals such as Coachella, Fuji Rock Festival and Ultra Music Festival, and remixes for artists like Paul Johnson, Justice, Chromeo, DJ Mehdi, and Kavinsky. During this time, Surkin's productions are notable for their use of heavily modified vocal samples and the use of cut-up.

In 2011 he launched the independent record label Marble along with Para One and Bobmo.

In late 2011 Surkin released his first album USA, which was called by dance magazine Mixmag "one of the most exciting concept albums of the 21st century". The album is influenced by Detroit techno, 80's electro and Chicago house, featuring vocals by Ann Saunderson from Inner City and Marshall Jefferson collaborator Kevin Irving.

In 2015 he released the EP The New International Sound Part II featuring vocals by M.I.A, under the name GENER8ION. The subsequent music video, directed by Inigo Westmeier and executive produced by French director Romain Gavras, was shot at the Chinese fighting school of Shaolin Tagou and featured a synchronized choreography by 36,000 of their students.

In 2016, Surkin composed the original music of the Nike campaign "Da Da Ding" which won numerous awards at international advertising competitions, and scored the launch video of the iPhone 7 "Don't Blink", which was shown in September at the Apple keynote in Cupertino. In March 2016, he released a visual magazine called "Unite Or Perish", and a new EP under the name Gener8ion called "GN8003" through the French label Bromance.

In 2017 Surkin collaborated with fashion brand Dior to create the music of their campaign "Poison Club", and composed the music of the global Mercedes-Benz campaign "Never Stop Improving" featuring Roger Federer.

On 24 April 2026, Gener8ion released the dual single "Storm" featuring Swedish rapper Yung Lean. It was accompanied by a seven-minute music video filmed at a school in Belgium set in 2034, directed by Romain Gavras and choreographed by Damien Jalet. The first album under the alias Gener8ion, titled Love & Tears, was released on 12 June 2026.

== Awards ==
- 2017: D&AD Awards – 'Nike, Da Da Ding' – Wood Pencil - Use of Music for Film Advertising
- 2017: Cannes Lion – 'Nike, Da Da Ding' – Bronze Lion - Use of Original Music
- 2026: UK Music Video Awards – "Storm"
  - Video of the Year
  - Best Dance / Electronic Video – International

== Discography ==
=== Albums ===
- Action Replay (2007, Institubes/Klee)
- USA (2011, Marble/Ed Banger/EMI Japan)
- USA Club Mixes (2012, Marble)
- Athena – Soundtrack from the Netflix Film (2022, Maisie Anthems/Virgin)
- Love & Tears (2026, Iconoclast)

=== EP and singles ===
- Ghetto Obsession (2006, Institubes)
- Play Do / I Joke On You (2006, Arcade Mode)
- Radio Fireworks (2006, Institubes)
- Fireworks Refired (2007, Institubes)
- Next of Kin (2008, Institubes)
- Next of Kin, Mark II (2008, Institubes)
- Silver Island (2010, Institubes)
- Fan Out Remixes (2010, Institubes)
- Ultra Light (2011, Marble)
- Lose Yourself (2012, Marble)
- I Want You Back (with Todd Edwards) (2012, Sound Pellegrino)
- Advanced Entertainment System (2013, Marble)
- Neo Surf (2021, Iconoclast)
- Storm (2026, Iconoclast)

=== Production ===
- M.I.A. - Bring The Noize (2013, Interscope)
- Gener8ion & Yung Lean: STORM (2026, Iconoclast)

=== Remixes ===
Year	Artist	Title	Label
2005	M.I.A.	"Sunshowers" (Surkin vs. M.I.A.)	Institubes
2006	Para One	"Epiphanie Teaser" (Surkin Megamixx)	Institubes
2006	Para One	"Midnight Swim" (Surkin Drowning Mix)	Institubes
2007	Boys Noize	"Don't Believe the Hype" (Surkin Remix No. 1) & (Surkin Remix No. 2)	Boysnoize Records
2007	Chromeo	"Fancy Footwork" (Surkin Rogue Teens Remix)	Vice/Turbo
2007	DJ Mehdi	"Lucky Boy"	Ed Banger Records
2007	Foals	"Hummer"	Transgressive Records
2007	Goose	"Low Mode" (Surkin Mode)	Skint Records
2007	Justine Electra	"Killalady"	City Slang
2007	Kate Wax	"Catch the Buzz"	Mental Groove Records
2007	Klaxons	"Golden Skans"	Because Music
2007	Paul Johnson	"Hot"	Blackjack
2007	Spencer Parker	"Open Your Eyes"	Cr2 Records
2007	Teki Latex feat. Lio	"Les Matins de Paris"	Virgin
2007	VHS or BETA	"Burn It All Down"	Astralwerks
2007	Yuksek	"Composer"	Relish Recordings
2008	Justice	"DVNO"	Ed Banger Records
2008	Nacho Lovers	"Acid Life"	Scion Audio/Visual
2009	The Juan Maclean	"One Day"	DFA
2009	Street Fighter IV	"Bionic Commando"	
2011	Canblaster	"Totem" (Surkin 'Gravity' Edit)	Marble
2012	Mademoiselle Yulia	"Bam Me"	EMI Music Japan
2012	Drop the Lime	"Bandit Blues"	Ultra Records
2012	Usher	"Scream"	RCA
2012	M.I.A.	"Bad Girls"	
2013	Kavinsky	"Odd Look"	Mercury
2014	Charli XCX	"Boom Clap"	Atlantic
2015	Röyksopp and Jamie Irrepressible	"I Had This Thing"	Dog Triumph
2016	They	"Motley Crew"	Genius Records
