= Reading and Leeds Festivals line-ups =

Pair of music festivals

The Reading and Leeds Festivals are a pair of annual music festivals that take place in Reading and Leeds, England. The events both happen on the bank holiday weekend in August (on Friday, Saturday, Sunday), and share the same bill (occasionally with one or two exceptions). The festival's origins date to the Beaulieu Jazz Festival (1956–1961) which became the National Jazz Festival in 1961 (The National Jazz and Blues Festival in 1963) and settled in Reading in 1971. In 1999 a second leg was added at Leeds.

The following is a list of acts that have played at the festival.

== 1961 ==
=== Main stage ===
Richmond Saturday	Richmond Sunday
Alvin Roy's Saratoga Jazz Band; Bob Wallis and his Stureville Jazzmen; Bruce Turner Jump Band; Chris Barber's Jazz Band; Don Rendell Quintet; Fairweather-Brown Allstars; Gerry Brown's Jazzmen; Johnny Dankworth and his Orchestra; Joe Harriott Quintet; Johnny Dankworth Quartet; Jazz News Allstars; Mike Cotton Jazzmen; The Merseysippi Jazz Band; Ottilie Patterson; Ronnie Ross Quartet; Tubby Hayes Quintet	Alex Welsh and His Band; Alan Elsdon and His Jazz Band; The Back O' Town Syncopators; Clyde Valley Stompers; Dick Charlesworth and His City Gents; Jackie Lynn; Ken Colyer's Jazzmen; Ken Sims' Vintage Jazz Band; Original Downtown Syncopaters; Sutton Chicago Jazz Group; Terry Lightfoot; Tony Russell Student Orchestra

== 1962 ==
=== Main stage ===
Richmond Saturday 28 July	Richmond Sunday 29 July
Chris Barber's Jazz Band; Ottilie Patterson; Humphrey Lyttelton Band; Alex Welsh & his Band; Bruce Turner's Jump Band; Bob Wallis and his Storeyvile Jazz Band; Coe-Picard Quintet; Gerry Brown's Jazzmen; Keith Christie-Wally Fawkes; Cyril Preston's Jazz Band; Festival Big Band – dir. by Chris Barber & Humphrey Lyttelton	Kenny Ball's Jazzmen; Johnny Dankworth Quintet; Terry Lightfoot's Jazzmen; Joe Harriott Quintet; Dick Charlesworth Band; Tubby Hayes Quintet; Forrie Cairns & The Clansmen; Ronnie Ross Quartet; Back o' Town Syncopaters; Don Rendell Quintet; Alvin Roy's Jazz Band; New Orleans Brass Band led by Ken Colyer

== 1963 ==
=== Main stage ===
Richmond Saturday 10 August	Richmond Sunday 11 August
Chris Barber and his Jazz Band; Ottilie Patterson; Alex Welsh Band; Humphrey Lyttelton Band; Dill Jones Trio; Rustix; Ginger Johnson's African Drums; Graham Bond Quartet; Georgie Fame Group; The Mastersounds; Tubby Hayes Quintet; Joe Harriott Quintet; Ronnie Ross Quartet with Bill Sage; Frank Holder; John Williams Big Band; Mike Falana	Acker Bilk's Paramount Jazz Band; Terry Lightfoot's Jazzmen; Freddy Randall Band; Blue Note Jazz Band; Cyril Davies' Rhythm and Blues Allstars; Long John Baldry; The Rolling Stones; The Velvettes; Night Shift (incl. Jeff Beck)

=== Notes ===
The third NJF Festival saw the first non-Jazz acts appear, notably the Rolling Stones and Long John Baldry on the Sunday afternoon. The Sunday afternoon session featured the final heats of the National Amateur Jazz Contest featuring twelve jazz bands chosen from semi-finals held across Britain.

== 1964 ==
=== Main stage ===
Richmond Friday 7 August	Richmond Saturday 8 August	Richmond Sunday 9 August
The Rolling Stones; The T-Bones (incl. Gary Farr); Val McCallum and the Authentics; The Grebbels; Night Shift	Chris Barber Band; Ottilie Patterson; Alex Welsh Band; Colin Kingwell's Jazz Bandits; Long John Baldry and the Hoochie Coochie Men; Manfred Mann; Memphis Slim; Jimmy Witherspoon; Ronnie Scott Quartet; Johnny Scott Quintet; Dick Morrissey Quartet; Tubby Hayes Big Band	Kenny Ball and His Jazzmen; The African Messengers (incl. Ginger Johnson); The Graham Bond Organisation; Humphrey Lyttelton Band; Georgie Fame and the Blue Flames; The Yardbirds; Mose Allison

=== Notes ===
The Festival expanded to three days with the addition of a rhythm & blues themed Friday evening session. The Sunday afternoon session featured the fourteen best jazz bands from a National Amateur Jazz Contest chosen from regional contests held nationwide.

== 1965 ==
=== Main stage ===
Richmond Friday 6 August	Richmond Saturday 7 August	Richmond Sunday 8 August
The Yardbirds; The Who; The Moody Blues; The Mike Cotton Sound	Manfred Mann; Georgie Fame and The Blue Flames; Graham Bond Organisation; Gary Farr & The T-Bones; The Bruce Turner Jump Band; Ronnie Jones and the Blue Jays; Ronnie Scott; Dick Morrissey; Albert Mangelsdorff Quintet; The New Jazz Orchestra	The Animals; Spencer Davis; Jimmy James and the Vagabonds; Alex Welsh Band; The Steam Packet with the Brian Auger Trinity; Rod Stewart; Julie Driscoll; Long John Baldry; Chris Barber; Kenny Ball; Ottilie Patterson; Ken Colyer; The Dedicated Men's Jug Band; Johnny Parker; Barry Martyn's Ragtime Band; Keith Christie; Bobby Wellins

== 1966 ==
=== Main stage ===
Windsor Friday 29 July	Windsor Saturday 30 July	Windsor Sunday 31 July
Small Faces; Spencer Davis; The Soul Agents; Mark Barry; Marmalade; Geno Washington and the Ram Jam Band	The Who; The Yardbirds; Chris Farlowe and the Thunderbirds; The Move; Gary Farr and the T-Bones; The Summer Set; Julian Covey and the Machine (Philip Kinorra); Jimmy James and the Vagabonds; Chris Barber; Alex Welsh; Colin Kingwell's Jazz Bandits; Kid Martyn's Ragtime Band with Louis Nelson	Georgie Fame and the Blue Flames; Cream; The Action; Diane and Nicky; Alan Bown; The Harry South Orchestra; Bluesology; Dick Morrissey; Stan Tracey; Ernestine Anderson; Kenny Baker; Ronnie Scott; Keith Christie; Bobby Wellins

=== Notes ===
The Festival moved to the larger Windsor Racecourse venue in 1966 after five years at Richmond Athletic Ground. Cream were billed as 'Eric Clapton – Jack Bruce – Ginger Baker' as the band were still unnamed when promotional posters & advertising were printed.

== 1967 ==
=== Main stage ===
Windsor Friday 11 August	Windsor Saturday 12 August	Windsor Sunday 13 August
Small Faces; The Move; Eric Burdon and the New Animals; Tomorrow; Marmalade; The Syn; The Nite People	The Nice; Paul Jones; The Crazy World of Arthur Brown; Zoot Money; Amen Corner; Adams Recital; Aynsley Dunbar's Retaliation; Ten Years After; Timebox; Al Cohn & Zoot Sims; Graham Collier Septet; Danny Moss Quartet; Yusef Lateef; Mike Carr Trio; London Jazz Four	Cream; John Mayall's Bluesbreakers; P.P. Arnold; Jeff Beck; Alan Bown; Denny Laine; Pentangle; Peter Green's Fleetwood Mac; Chicken Shack; Donovan; Ottilie Patterson; Al Stewart; Piccadilly Line (Edwards Hand)

=== Marquee stage ===
Windsor Saturday	Windsor Sunday
Aynsley Dunbar's Retaliation; Ten Years After; Timebox; Richard Kent Style	Pentangle; Peter Green's Fleetwood Mac; Chicken Shack; Blossom Toes

=== Notes ===
Pink Floyd pulled out on Saturday evening due to singer/guitarist Syd Barrett's health problems and were replaced by The Nice. The Nice also acted as backing band for P P Arnold. A second "Marquee" stage was added on Saturday and Sunday evenings. Four bands played sets each night, three of which also appeared on the main stage on the same day.

== 1968 ==
=== Main stage ===
Sunbury Friday 10 August	Sunbury Saturday 11 August	Sunbury Sunday 12 August
The Herd; Marmalade; Taste; Jerry Lee Lewis; Timebox	The Nice; Jeff Beck; Ten Years After; The Crazy World of Arthur Brown; Tyrannosaurus Rex; Joe Cocker; The Nite People; Clouds; Ginger Baker; Deep Purple; John Hendricks; Ronnie Scott Quintet; Don Rendell; Ian Carr Quintet; Alan Haven Trio; Mike Westbrook Band	Traffic; Spencer Davis; John Mayall; Fairport Convention; Chicken Shack; Jethro Tull; Tramline; The Incredible String Band; Eclection; Sonya; The Johnstons; Al Stewart & Fairport Convention; Dynaflow Blues

== 1969 ==
=== Main stage ===
Plumpton Friday 8 August	Plumpton Saturday 9 August Afternoon	Plumpton Saturday 9 August Evening	Plumpton Sunday 10 August Afternoon	Plumpton Sunday 10 August Evening
Pink Floyd; Soft Machine; East of Eden; Blossom Toes; Keith Tippett Jazz Group; Junior's Eyes; The Village	Bonzo Dog Band; Roy Harper; The Strawbs; Breakthru'; Jigsaw; Peter Hammill	The Who; Chicken Shack; Fat Mattress; John Surman; Aynsley Dunbar; Yes; The Spirit of John Morgan; King Crimson; Idle Race; The Groundhogs; Dry Ice; The Wallace Collection	Pentangle; Long John Baldry; Ron Geesin; Jo-Ann Kelly; Magna Carta; Noel Murphy	The Nice; Family; London Cast of 'Hair'; Chris Barber; Keef Hartley; Eclection; Blodwyn Pig; Circus; Hard Meat; Steamhammer; Babylon; Cuby's Blues Band

== 1970 ==
=== Main stage ===
Plumpton Thursday	Plumpton Friday	Plumpton Saturday	Plumpton Sunday
Jellybread; Fox; Samuel Purdy; Castle	Family; Steamhammer; The Groundhogs; Fat Mattress; Rare Bird; Audience; Clark Hutchinson; Patto; Daddy Longlegs	Taste; Hardin York; Jackson Heights; Black Sabbath; Keef Hartley; Peter Green; East of Eden; Granny's New Intentions; Magna Carta; Strawbs; Cat Stevens; Fotheringay; Gracious; Made in Sweden	Deep Purple; Juicy Lucy; Yes; Hard Meat; Van Der Graaf Generator; Colosseum; Every Which Way; Chris Barber Band; Turley Richards; Incredible String Band; Trevor Billmuss; Matthews Southern Comfort; Burnin' Red Ivanhoe

=== Village stage ===
Village Stage Saturday	Village Stage Sunday
The Chicago Climax Blues Band; Quatermass; Wild Angels; Brethren; T2	Da-Da; Chris Barber Band; Wishbone Ash; Caravan

=== Notes ===
The 1970 Festival was a four-day event for the only time in its history, with a South of England Local Talent session in the main arena on the Thursday evening. A 'Village' stage was added on Saturday and Sunday running from later afternoon to mid-evening.

== 1971 ==
=== Main stage ===
Reading Friday	Reading Saturday	Reading Sunday
Arthur Brown; Daddy Longlegs; Warm Dust; Bell & Arc; Ricotti/Albuquerque; Armada; Accrington Stanley; Anno Domini	East of Eden; Sha Na Na; Lindisfarne; Ralph McTell; Hardin & York; Wishbone Ash; Terry Reid; Stud; Renaissance; Audience; Genesis; Gillian McPherson; Universe	Colosseum; Rory Gallagher; Al Kooper; Iain Matthews; Medicine Head; Van Der Graaf Generator; Osibisa; Stray; Demick & Armstrong; Clark Hutchinson; Storyteller; Country Jug; Colonel Bagshot; Steel Mill

=== Notes ===
In 1971 the Festival moved to its permanent home at Little John's Farm on the south bank of the River Thames in Reading, a venue it has remained at ever since (with the exception of two years in the 1980s when the Festival was banned by the Conservative Party controlled Reading Borough Council).

== 1972 ==
=== Main stage ===
Reading Friday	Reading Saturday	Reading Sunday
Curved Air; Mungo Jerry; Genesis; Jackson Heights; The Pretty Things; Nazareth; Steamhammer; Cottonwood; Good Habit	Faces; Electric Light Orchestra; Johnny Otis; If; Jericho; Edgar Broughton Band; Focus; Linda Lewis; Man; Solid Gold Cadillac; Jonathan Kelly	Quintessence; Ten Years After; Mahatma Kane Jeeves Band; Wizzard; Stray; Status Quo; Vinegar Joe; Stackridge; Matching Mole; String Driven Thing; Gillian McPherson; Sutherland Brothers

== 1973 ==
=== Main stage ===
Reading Friday	Reading Saturday	Reading Sunday
Rory Gallagher; Jo'burg Hawk; Commander Cody; Capability Brown; Greenslade; Stray Dog; Alquin; Embryo	Faces; Andy Bown; Status Quo; Strider; Sensational Alex Harvey Band; Chris Barber; Lindisfarne; Magma; Fumble; Riff Raff; Tasavallan Presidentti; Quadrille; Claire Hamill; Dave Ellis	Genesis; The Spencer Davis Group; Jimmy Witherspoon; Mahatma; Jon Hiseman's Tempest; George Melly; Stackridge; Medicine Head; Jack The Lad; Premiata Forneria Marconi; Tim Hardin; Ange; John Martyn and Danny Thompson; A J Webber

=== Notes ===
Roy Buchanan and Bert Jansch were scheduled to appear, but they did not play.

== 1974 ==
=== Main stage ===
Reading Friday	Reading Saturday	Reading Sunday
The Sensational Alex Harvey Band; 10cc; Camel; Beckett; Johnny Mars	Traffic; Ronnie Lane; Greenslade; JSD Band; Blodwyn Pig; Sutherland Brothers; Heavy Metal Kids; Trapeze; G. T. Moore and the Reggae Guitars; Georgie Fame and the Blue Flames; John Baldry	Focus; Eric Burdon; Barclay James Harvest; Refugee; Gryphon; Strider; Esperanto; The Winkies; Harvey Andrews & Graham Cooper; George Melly; Kiki Dee

== 1975 ==
=== Main stage ===
Reading Friday	Reading Saturday	Reading Sunday
Hawkwind; Dr. Feelgood; U.F.O.; Kokomo; Judas Priest; Joan Armatrading	Yes; Supertramp; Ozark Mountain Daredevils; Alan Stivell; Thin Lizzy; Snafu; String Driven Thing; Kursaal Flyers; Alberto y Lost Trios Paranoias	Wishbone Ash; Alberto Y Los Trios Paranoias; Mahavishnu Orchestra; Soft Machine; Caravan; Richard & Linda Thompson; Heavy Metal Kids; Babe Ruth; Climax Blues Band

== 1976 ==
=== Main stage ===
Reading Friday	Reading Saturday	Reading Sunday
Gong; Mallard; Mighty Diamonds; Supercharge; U Roy; Roy St. John; Stallion	Rory Gallagher; Camel; Phil Manzanera; Van Der Graaf Generator; Manfred Mann; Sadista Sisters; Jon Hiseman's Colosseum; Pat Travers Band; Moon; Eddie & The Hot Rods; Nick Pickett	Osibisa; Black Oak Arkansas; Ted Nugent; Sutherland Bros & Quiver; AC/DC; Brand X; Sassafras; BackDoor; A Band Called O; The Enid; Aft; Howard Bragen

== 1977 ==
=== Main stage ===
Reading Friday	Reading Saturday	Reading Sunday
Golden Earring; Eddie and the Hot Rods; Uriah Heep; Lone Star; Five Hand Reel; Kingfish; Woody Woodmansey's U-Boat; S.A.L.T; Staa Marx	Thin Lizzy; Graham Parker and the Rumour; Aerosmith; John Miles; Little River Band; Ultravox; George Hatcher Band; No Dice; Krazy Kat; Gloria Mundi	The Sensational Alex Harvey Band; The Doobie Brothers; Wayne County and the Electric Chairs; Hawkwind; The Enid; The Motors

=== Notes ===
Frankie Miller, Widowmaker, Racing Cars, Blue, Tiger, and Hand Reef all made appearances, but their place on the lineup is unclear.

== 1978 ==
=== Main stage ===
Reading Friday	Reading Saturday	Reading Sunday
The Jam; Ultravox; Pirates; Sham 69; Penetration; Radio Stars; New Hearts; The Automatics; Dennis O'Brien	Status Quo; The Motors; Spirit; Lindisfarne; The Greg Kihn Band; Next; Gruppo Sportivo; The Business; Jenny Darren; Speedometers	Patti Smith; Tom Robinson Band; Foreigner; Chelsea; Ian Gillan Band; Paul Inder; Albion Band; John Otway; Squeeze; Bethnal; Pacific Eardrum; After The Fire

== 1979 ==
=== Main stage ===
Reading Friday	Reading Saturday	Reading Sunday
The Police; The Tourists; Motörhead; Wilko Johnson; The Cure; Doll by Doll; Punishment of Luxury; The Jags; Bite the Pillow	The Scorpions; Inner Circle; Cheap Trick; Steve Hackett; Gillan; Bram Tchaikovsky; The Movies; Little Bo Bitch; The Yachts; Root Boy Slim and the Sex Change Band	Peter Gabriel; Whitesnake; Nils Lofgren; Climax Blues Band; Molly Hatchet; The Members; Wild Horses; Zaine Griff; Speedometers; Terra Nova; The Cobbers

=== Notes ===
Thin Lizzy were scheduled to headline on Saturday but cancelled. After the Fire and The Ramones were also scheduled to play but cancelled.

== 1980 ==
=== Main stage ===
Reading Friday	Reading Saturday	Reading Sunday
Rory Gallagher; Gillan; Krokus; Nine Below Zero; Fischer-Z; Praying Mantis; Hellions; O1 Band; Red Alert	UFO; Iron Maiden; Pat Travers Band; Samson; Grand Prix; White Spirit; Broken Home; Writz; Quartz; Trimmer and Jenkins	Whitesnake; Def Leppard; Slade; Budgie; Magnum; Girl; Tygers of Pan Tang; Angel Witch; Sledgehammer

=== Notes ===
Angel City withdrew and were replaced by Grand Prix, Q-Tips also pulled out, being replaced by White Spirit. Gary Moore's G-Force were also originally scheduled to play but cancelled. Headboys (replaced by Quartz) and Ozzy Osbourne's Blizzard of Ozz (replaced by Slade) were also cancellations, while The Pencils pulled out at the last minute when all of their equipment was stolen the night before.

== 1981 ==
=== Main stage ===
Reading Friday	Reading Saturday	Reading Sunday
Girlschool; Steve Hackett; Budgie; Telephone; Saga; Lightning Raiders; Nightwing; 1990; Long Tall Shorty; Twelfth Night	Gillan; Trust; Billy Squier; Rose Tattoo; Samson; Lionheart; Vardis; Atomic Rooster; Jackie Lynton's Allstars; Parachutes	The Kinks; Nine Below Zero; Greg Lake; Wishbone Ash; 38 Special; Desperadoes; The Enid; Afraid of Mice; The Reluctant Stereotypes; Andy Allan's Future

=== Notes ===
Thompson Twins, Midnight Oil, Outlaws, The Marshall Tucker Band and Alex Harvey Band were originally scheduled to play but cancelled. Stan Webb's Chicken Shack pulled out due to illness and were replaced at short notice by Atomic Rooster.

== 1982 ==
=== Main stage ===
Reading Friday	Reading Saturday	Reading Sunday
Budgie; Diamond Head; Randy California; Barón Rojo; Praying Mantis; Tank; Stampede; Overkill; The Angels; Against the Grain	Iron Maiden; Tygers of Pan Tang; Blackfoot; Gary Moore; Cheetah; Ore; Bernie Torme; Grand Prix; Rock Goddess; Bow Wow; Just Good Friends	Michael Schenker Group; Jackie Lynton Band; Y&T; Dave Edmunds; Bernie Marsden's SOS; Wilko Johnson & Lew Lewis; Twisted Sister; Marillion; Spider; Chinatown; Terraplane

== 1983 ==
=== Main stage ===
Reading Friday	Reading Saturday	Reading Sunday
The Stranglers; Big Country; Steel Pulse; Man; Hanoi Rocks; Pallas; Solstice; Pendragon; Auto da fé	Black Sabbath; Marillion; Stevie Ray Vaughan with Double Trouble; Suzi Quatro; Anvil; Magnum; Mama's Boys; Heavy Pettin; Lee Aaron; Fortune; Crazy Angel	Thin Lizzy; Little Steven & The Disciples Of Soul; Ten Years After; Steve Harley & Cockney Rebel; Climax Blues Band; The Enid; Sad Cafe; One the Juggler; Twelfth Night; The Opposition

== 1984 ==
The 1984 Festival was cancelled when the Conservative Party took control of Reading Borough Council. The announced line-up was due to be:

=== Main stage ===
Reading Friday	Reading Saturday	Reading Sunday
Hawkwind; Boomtown Rats; Snowy White; The Playn Jayne; Dumpy's Rusty Nuts; Wildfire; Chelsea Eloy; Tracey Lamb; New Torpedoes	Jethro Tull; Hanoi Rocks; Steve Hackett; Club Karlsson; Nazareth; Twelfth Night; Thor; Silent Running; New Model Army; IQ; The Roaring Boys; She	Marillion; Grand Slam; The Bluebells; Helix; Clannad; The Opposition; The Enid; Young Blood; Scorched Earth; Terraplane

== 1985 ==
No festival held this year

== 1986 ==
=== Main stage ===
Reading Friday	Reading Saturday	Reading Sunday
Killing Joke; Dr & the Medics; The Mission; Balaam & the Angel; Fields of the Nephilim; March Violets; Twenty Flight Rockers; The Bolshoi; Larry Miller; Dog 'Ouse	Saxon; Outlaws; John Waite & the No Brakes Band; Rough Cutt; Ruby Turner; Buddy Curtess & the Grasshoppers; Graham Parker & the Fact; FM; It Bites; Outside Edge; Skagarack	Hawkwind; The Lords of the New Church; Zodiac Mindwarp and the Love Reaction; New Model Army; The Enid; Cherry Bombz; Dumpy's Rusty Nuts; Thrashing Doves; Well Well Well; Cardiacs

== 1987 ==
=== Main stage ===
Reading Friday	Reading Saturday	Reading Sunday
The Mission; Spear of Destiny*No Show; The Fall; Icicle Works; Fields of the Nephilim*Extended Set; The Godfathers; All About Eve; The Babysitters	Status Quo; Georgia Satellites; Magnum; Lee Aaron; MGM; Terraplane; Glory; Shy; Dumpy's Rusty Nuts; Quireboys; Blues 'n' Trouble	Alice Cooper; The Stranglers; Zodiac Mindwarp and the Love Reaction; FM; The Bolshoi; The Enid; Vow Wow; Lizzy Borden; Gypsy Queen; Virginia Wolf; Kooga; Chariot

== 1988 ==
=== Main stage ===
Reading Friday	Reading Saturday	Reading Sunday
Iggy Pop; The Ramones; Fields of the Nephilim; The Godfathers; Ghost Dance; The Wonder Stuff; The Lover Speaks; The Seers	Starship; Meat Loaf; Uriah Heep; Bonnie Tyler; Gene Loves Jezebel; Quireboys; Runrig; Bonfire; The Name	Squeeze; The Smithereens; John Hiatt; Hothouse Flowers; Deacon Blue; Broken English; Ranking Roger; Roachford; The Lucy Show; John Otway

== 1989 ==
=== Main stage ===
Reading Friday	Reading Saturday	Reading Sunday
New Order; The Sugarcubes; House of Love; Swans; Tackhead; That Petrol Emotion; My Bloody Valentine; Spacemen 3; Gaye Bykers on Acid	The Pogues; New Model Army; The Wedding Present; Billy Bragg; Green on Red; Mary Coughlan; The Men They Couldn't Hang; Les Négresses Vertes; Bhundu Boys; Something Happens	The Mission; The Wonder Stuff; Butthole Surfers; Voice of the Beehive; Pop Will Eat Itself; Crazyhead; Jesus Jones; Loop; Head of David; World Dom Enterprises

=== Mean Fiddler stage ===
Reading Friday	Reading Saturday	Reading Sunday
Tom Robinson; Andy Pawlak; The River Detectives; Evon Brenon; The Senators; The Barely Works; Ancient Beat Box; The Jack Rubies; God's Little Monkeys	The Cropdusters; Frank Sidebottom; Edward II & the Red Hot Polka; John Wesley Harding; Sons of the Desert; Joolz Denby; To Hell with Burgundy; Orchestra Jazira; Shanty Dam; Kevin Kennedy & A Bunch of Thieves; Los Pistoleros; McCavity's Cat	Clive Gregson / Christine Collister; Stephen Fearing; Sally Timms; Ted Hawkins; Hank Wangford; King Pleasure & The Biscuit Boys; All Because The Lady Loves; Gutter Brothers; The Dinner Ladies; Andrew Cunningham; Peter Jagger

== 1990 ==
=== Main stage ===
Reading Friday	Reading Saturday	Reading Sunday
The Cramps; Faith No More; Nick Cave and the Bad Seeds; Mudhoney; Jane's Addiction *No Show; An Emotional Fish; Mega City Four	Inspiral Carpets; The Wedding Present; Buzzcocks; Billy Bragg; Ride; The Young Gods; Wire; Psychic TV; Ned's Atomic Dustbin; The Black Velvet Band	Pixies; The Fall; Jesus Jones; Tackhead; Loop; Living Colour; Stereo MCs; The Telescopes; Thee Hypnotics; Senseless Things

=== Mean Fiddler stage ===
Reading Friday	Reading Saturday	Reading Sunday
Tom Robinson Band; Macavity's Cat; Luka Bloom; Half Man Half Biscuit; Skint Video; Frank Tovey; The Penny Candles; All Because The Lady Loves; Keziah Jones; Lost T-Shirts	Martin Stephenson and the Daintees; Furniture; Man From Delmonte; The Fatima Mansions; The Railway Children; Andy Pawlak; Milltown Brothers; The Trash Can Sinatras; The Liberties; Peter Blegvad; Shawn Colvin; Jinsky	Jonathan Richman; Oysterband; The Band of Holy Joy; Ruby Blue; The Bridewell Taxis; Summerhill; The Katydids; Fat and Frantic; McDermott's Two Hours; Andrew Cunningham; Pat Orchard; Dr Millar & The Cute Hoors; Dave Robb

== 1991 ==
=== Main stage ===
Reading Friday	Reading Saturday	Reading Sunday
Iggy Pop; Sonic Youth; Pop Will Eat Itself; Dinosaur Jr.; Chapterhouse; Nirvana; Silverfish; Babes in Toyland; The Honeythieves	James; Carter the Unstoppable Sex Machine; The Fall; De La Soul; Blur; Teenage Fanclub; Flowered Up; The Fat Lady Sings; Kingmaker; Mercury Rev	The Sisters of Mercy; Ned's Atomic Dustbin; The Godfathers; Gang Starr; Nitzer Ebb; Senseless Things; Kitchens of Distinction; Swervedriver; Screaming Target; The Family Cat

=== Mean Fiddler stage ===
Reading Friday	Reading Saturday	Reading Sunday
American Music Club; Guy Clarke & Townes Van Zandt; Sweetmouth; Thin White Rope; etc.	Edwyn Collins; The Milltown Brothers; Five Thirty; Power of Dreams; The Real People; etc.	The Blue Aeroplanes; New Fast Automatic Daffodils; The Cropdusters; Fatima Mansions; etc.

=== Comedy stage ===
Reading Friday	Reading Saturday	Reading Sunday
Denis Leary; Frank Sidebottom; Richard Herring; etc.	Jerry Sadowitz; etc.	Sean Hughes; Tommy Cockles; Jo Brand

== 1992 ==
=== Main stage ===
Reading Friday	Reading Saturday	Reading Sunday
The Wonder Stuff; The Charlatans; Public Image Ltd.; PJ Harvey; Mega City Four; Milltown Brothers; The Fatima Mansions; Redd Kross	Public Enemy; Ride; EMF; Manic Street Preachers; The Farm; The Smashing Pumpkins; Rollins Band; Thousand Yard Stare; Buffalo Tom; Therapy?	Nirvana; Nick Cave and the Bad Seeds; Mudhoney; Teenage Fanclub; L7 (special guests); Beastie Boys; Björn Again; Pavement; Screaming Trees; Melvins

=== Melody Maker stage ===
Reading Friday	Reading Saturday	Reading Sunday
Levitation; Cardiacs; Cracker; Lunachicks; Midway Still; The God Machine; Cop Shoot Cop; Leatherface; Some Have Fins; The Hair and Skin Trading Company; DF118	BAD II; Suede; Sunscreem; The Sultans of Ping FC; Natural Life; The Heart Throbs; Finitribe; Shonen Knife; Spitfire; Wire Train; The Stairs; Urge Overkill; Senser	The Rockingbirds; Catherine Wheel; Eat; Dr. Phibes and the House of Wax Equations; Revolver; Scorpio Rising; Pele; Eugenius; Power of Dreams; 25 May; Pop's Cool Love; Sweet Jesus; Tabitha Zu

=== Comedy stage ===
Reading Friday	Reading Saturday	Reading Sunday
Frank Sidebottom	The Doug Anthony Allstars	Frank Skinner

== 1993 ==
=== Main stage ===
Reading Friday	Reading Saturday	Reading Sunday
Porno for Pyros; Rage Against the Machine; Ned's Atomic Dustbin; Butthole Surfers; Babes in Toyland; Stone Temple Pilots; Bad Brains; Gallon Drunk; Tool	The The; Siouxsie and the Banshees; Therapy?; Ozric Tentacles; Gary Clail's On-U Sound System with Bim Sherman & Adrian Sherwood; Senseless Things; Kingmaker; EAT; Madder Rose; Gigolo Aunts	New Order; Dinosaur Jr.; The Lemonheads; Fishbone; The Breeders; The Goats; Alice Donut; Primus; The Jesus Lizard; Cop Shoot Cop

=== Melody Maker stage ===
Reading Friday	Reading Saturday	Reading Sunday
The Frank and Walters; Chumbawamba; Back to the Planet; Adorable; Leatherface; The Doughboys; The Flaming Lips; Green Apple Quick Step; Voodoo Queens; Fenn	Blur; Radiohead (did not play due to illness, replaced by EAT); Swervedriver; Drop Nineteens; The Mighty Mighty Bosstones; Senser; Credit to the Nation; Bivouac; Die Cheerleader; I Mother Earth; FMB; The Cherrys	Big Star; The Boo Radleys; Paul Westerberg; The Family Cat; The Juliana Hatfield Three; Bettie Serveert; The Pastels; Trumans Water; The Posies; Magnapop; Shampoo; Oilseed Rape

=== Comedy stage ===
Reading Friday	Reading Saturday	Reading Sunday
Frank Sidebottom; John Thomson; Simon Day; Mark Maler; Ian Cognito; John Mann; Logan Murray; John Maloney; Jenny LeCoat; Sean Med	Eddie Izzard	

== 1994 ==
=== Main stage ===
Reading Friday	Reading Saturday	Reading Sunday
Cypress Hill; The Lemonheads; Frank Black; Pavement; Hole; Gang Starr; Transglobal Underground; The Verve; The Flaming Lips; Collapsed Lung	Primal Scream; Ice Cube; Manic Street Preachers; Radiohead; Pulp; Terrorvision; Senseless Things; Fun-Da-Mental; Kitchens of Distinction; Rev. Horton Heat; Luscious Jackson	Red Hot Chili Peppers; Therapy?; Rollins Band; Senser; The Afghan Whigs; The Wildhearts; Helmet; The Jesus Lizard; Stabbing Westward; Cop Shoot Cop

=== Melody Maker stage ===
Reading Friday	Reading Saturday	Reading Sunday
The Wedding Present; Lush; Sebadoh; The Auteurs; Sleeper; Velocity Girl; Honky; Smudge; Drugstore; dEUS; The Tea Party	Madder Rose; Elastica; Compulsion; Shed Seven; Superchunk; Tiny Monroe; Gene; Lotion; Salad; Jale; Possum Dixon; Scarce; Shootyz Groove	Tindersticks; American Music Club; They Might Be Giants; Cud; Echobelly; Morphine; Jeff Buckley; Archers of Loaf; Scrawl; Dig; Cellophane; Candlebox

=== Comedy stage ===
Reading Friday	Reading Saturday	Reading Sunday
Jo Brand; Martin Coyote; John Otway; Attila the Stockbroker	Mark Thomas; Frank Sidebottom; John Thomson; Kevin Day	Eddie Izzard; Phil Davey; Lee Hurst

=== Notes ===
Soundgarden were due to play but cancelled when Chris Cornell was diagnosed with polyps on his vocal cords.

== 1995 ==
=== Main stage ===
Reading Friday	Reading Saturday	Reading Sunday
The Smashing Pumpkins; Green Day; Hole; Teenage Fanclub; Beck; dEUS; Juliana Hatfield; China Drum	Björk; Paul Weller; The Boo Radleys; Tricky; Throwing Muses; Shed Seven; Corduroy; Little Axe; Skunk Anansie; James Hall	Neil Young; Soundgarden; Pavement; Mudhoney; Buffalo Tom; Babes in Toyland; White Zombie; Blind Melon; Pennywise

=== Melody Maker stage ===
Reading Friday	Reading Saturday	Reading Sunday
Gene; Menswear; Stereolab; Marion; Guided by Voices; Whale; Moist; Weknowwhereyoulive; The Cardigans; Heather Nova	Foo Fighters; Echobelly; Drugstore; Electrafixion; The Bluetones; My Life Story; Snuff; 60 Ft. Dolls; Powder; Kaliphz; Puressence; Heavy Stereo; Embassy	Carter the Unstoppable Sex Machine; Monster Magnet; These Animal Men; Reef; Ash; Vent 414; Cast; Paw; Dub War; Silverchair; Geraldine Fibbers; Animals That Swim

=== Carlsberg stage ===
Reading Friday	Reading Saturday	Reading Sunday
Flying Saucer Attack; Prolapse; Joyrider; Understand; Cable; Ciafanes; Speedway; Solar Race; Space; Peepshow	Delicatessen; Flinch [Wrong Flinch hyper linked]; AC Acoustics; Pusherman; Small; Scarfo; Spare Snare; Hooker; Coast; Boutique; Pillbox; Hardbody; Speedy; Thomas Ribeiro	The Mike Flowers Pops; The Weekenders; Thurman; Elcka; Longpigs; Nyack; Super Furry Animals; Livingstone; Pullover; Star 69; Clockwork Dogs; Nilon Bombers; Crazy Gods of Endless Noise

=== Comedy stage ===
Reading Friday	Reading Saturday	Reading Sunday
Eddie Izzard; The Tracey Brothers; Mike Pinder Sextet; Raymond & Mr Timpkins Revue; Mark Hurst; Ian Stone; Paul Thorn; Woody Bop Muddy; Dermot Carmody; Phil Davey	Jerry Sadowitz; Mark Steel; Alister McGowan; John Mann; Phill Jupitus; Matthew Hardy; Andre Vincent; Terry Alderton; Rich Hall	Frank Sidebottom; Jeff Green; Hattie Hayridge; Matt Welcome; Sean Meo; Bastard Son Of Tommy Cooper; Ricky Grover; Malcolm Hardy; Will Durst

== 1996 ==
=== Main stage ===
Reading Friday	Reading Saturday	Reading Sunday
Rage Against the Machine; The Prodigy; The Offspring; Terrorvision; Weezer; Ice-T; Butthole Surfers; Downset.; Collapsed Lung; Seaweed	Black Grape; Garbage; Julian Cope; Dodgy; Billy Bragg; Marion; Super Furry Animals; Moloko; Ruby; Kula Shaker	The Stone Roses; Sonic Youth; Ash; Gene; Reef; The Wedding Present; Moby; Compulsion; The Posies; Audioweb

=== NME stage ===
Reading Friday	Reading Saturday	Reading Sunday
Rocket from the Crypt; Sebadoh; Bis; 60 Ft. Dolls; Drugstore; Social Distortion; Placebo; Sparklehorse; Urusei Yatsura; New Kingdom; Goldblade	Dubstar; Northern Uproar; Space; Catatonia; Salad; My Life Story; China Drum; The Brotherhood; Ben Folds Five; Tiger; Jack; Dweeb	Underworld; The Flaming Lips; Babybird; Lionrock; Tortoise; Vent 414; Girls Against Boys; 3 Colours Red; Scarfo; Linoleum; Earl Brutus

=== Dr. Martens Stage ===
Reading Friday	Reading Saturday	Reading Sunday
The Divine Comedy; Geneva; The Gyres; Soul Coughing; Scheer; Sense Field; Symposium; The Driven; Biddle; Nut; Alone; Feeder; Chest; The Pin-Ups	Rare; Mansun; Octopus; Embassy; Kenickie; Jocasta; Monkfish; 22-Pistepirkko; Bennet; Rude Club; The Supernaturals; Posh; Supermodel; Subcircus; Davey	The Raincoats; AC Acoustics; Bawl; Quickspace; Laxton's Superb; Alabama 3; Broadcast; 12 Rounds; Tunic; Brassy; The Daisies; Dirty Three; Rehab; Pallet

=== Notes ===
Despite being billed as headliners on the Friday night, Rage Against the Machine played their set before The Prodigy

== 1997 ==
=== Main stage ===
Reading Friday	Reading Saturday	Reading Sunday
Suede; Cast; James; Stereolab; The Jon Spencer Blues Explosion; Kenickie; Fountains of Wayne; Strangelove; Scarfo	Manic Street Preachers; The Orb; Space; The Lemonheads; Super Furry Animals; The Cardigans; Republica; Apollo 440; Stereophonics	Metallica; Terrorvision; Marilyn Manson; Bush; Dinosaur Jr.; 3 Colours Red; Descendents; Dog Eat Dog; Feeder; Radish

=== Dr. Martens Stage ===
Reading Friday	Reading Saturday	Reading Sunday
Jonathan Fire*Eater; 16 Horsepower; Jack; Penthouse; Dust Junkys; Rialto; Livingstone; Formula One; Tonic; Carrie; Spy 51; Period Pains	Bentley Rhythm Ace; Edward Ball; Broadcast; Adventures in Stereo; Sussed; The Hybirds; Mulu; Don LK; The Dandys; Silverjet; Cube; Proper; Speedway	Bis; Cornershop; DJ Hurricane; Dweeb; J Church; Midget; Posh; Garageland; theaudience; Ultrasound; Disco Pistol; Girlfrendo; Nightnurse

=== Melody Maker stage ===
Reading Friday	Reading Saturday	Reading Sunday
The Boo Radleys; Symposium; Catatonia; Silver Sun; Cake; Simon Warner; Luna; Earl Brutus; Pecadiloes; Mainstream	Eels; The Wannadies; Gorky's Zygotic Mynci; Death in Vegas; Tiger; Travis; Puressence; Royal Trux; Goldblade; You Am I; Warm Jets; Rude Club	The Verve; Audioweb; Asian Dub Foundation; Embrace; Subcircus; Bennet; Hurricane#1; Mogwai; Snug; Arnold; Toaster; Lower

=== Vans Warped Tour stage ===
Reading Friday
- Millencolin
- Down By Law
- Pennywise
- Sick of It All
- Limp Bizkit
- Royal Crown Revue
- Dance Hall Crashers
- Blink-182
- A
- One Inch Punch

== 1998 ==
=== Main stage ===
Reading Friday	Reading Saturday	Reading Sunday
Jimmy Page, Robert Plant; Ash; Mansun; Deftones; The Afghan Whigs; Symposium; Rocket from the Crypt; Monster Magnet; Headswim	Beastie Boys; Prodigy; Supergrass; Foo Fighters; Echo & the Bunnymen; Lee "Scratch" Perry; Rancid; Asian Dub Foundation; Money Mark; Jurassic 5; Bis	Garbage; New Order; The Bluetones; Shed Seven; The Divine Comedy; Monaco; Audioweb; Drugstore; Girls Against Boys

=== Melody Maker stage ===
Reading Friday	Reading Saturday	Reading Sunday
Super Furry Animals; Mogwai; Kenickie; 60ft. Dolls; Arab Strap; Lodger; Yo La Tengo; Grandaddy; The Delgados; The Soundtrack of Our Lives; Disco Pistol	Travis; Bentley Rhythm Ace; Warm Jets; Unbelievable Truth; The Montrose Avenue; Jonathan Fire*Eater; Idlewild; Campag Velocet; Snug; Addict; Llama Farmers; Seafood	Spiritualized; Ultrasound; Theaudience – see Notes (below); Royal Trux; Soul Coughing; Smash Mouth; Urusei Yatsura; Dust Junkys; Six by Seven; Carrie; A; The Dandys; The Interpreters

=== Dr. Martens Stage ===
Reading Friday	Reading Saturday	Reading Sunday
Gomez; Scott 4; Grand Drive; Formula One; Sunhouse; Spearmint; Medal; Flight 14; Stroke; Fungus; The Wasp Factory; The Reviver Gene; Gel	Cognac; Alabama 3; Dawn of the Replicants; Earl Brutus; Laptop; Sleater-Kinney; Elliott Smith; Gay Dad; Hefner; Electric Sound of Joy; Clinic; Superior; El Niño; PH Family; Toploader; Ten Benson	Fu Manchu; The Pecadiloes; Regular Fries; Mover; Satellite Beach; NT; The Six; Backyard Babies; One Lady Owner; Ooberman; Regurgitator; Merz; Huckleberry; Vyvyan

=== Carlsberg Export stage ===
Reading Friday	Reading Saturday	Reading Sunday
Vans Warped Stage	Full Evolve Stage	Big Beat Boutique
Bad Religion; The Specials; CIV; Lagwagon; No Fun at All; Unsane; Pitchshifter; Cherry Poppin' Daddies; Liberator; MxPx; The Smooths; Unwritten Law	Roni Size Reprazent; Freestylers; DJ's Frost and Bryan Gee; Bill Ryley; J-Raqs; More Rockers; Flynn and Flora	Bentley Rhythm Ace; DeeJay Punk-Roc; Monkey Mafia; Justin Robertson; Lo Fidelity DJs; Les Rhythmes Digitales; DJ Touche; Cut La Roc

=== Notes ===
Curve were due to play on the Melody Maker stage on the Sunday but were replaced by Theaudience at short notice.

== 1999 ==
=== Main stage ===
Reading Friday	Reading Saturday	Reading Sunday
Leeds Saturday	Leeds Sunday	Leeds Monday
The Charlatans; The Chemical Brothers; Reef; Echo & the Bunnymen; Space; Gene; The Dandy Warhols; Apollo 440; The Donnas	Blur; Catatonia; Fun Lovin' Criminals; The Divine Comedy; Pavement; Beth Orton; Sebadoh; The Pharcyde; Sleater-Kinney; Atari Teenage Riot	Red Hot Chili Peppers; The Offspring; Terrorvision; Silverchair; Feeder; Pitchshifter; Sick of It All; Buckcherry; Backyard Babies; Lit

=== Radio 1 Evening Session stage ===
Reading Friday	Reading Saturday	Reading Sunday
Leeds Saturday	Leeds Sunday	Leeds Monday
Elastica; The Jon Spencer Blues Explosion; Stereolab; The Fall; Guided by Voices; Puressence; Bis; Add N to (X); Clinic; Bellatrix; The Paradise Motel	3 Colours Red; Idlewild; Symposium; Kent; Six by Seven; Madder Rose; My Life Story; Snuff; Ten Benson; Doves; Fungus; Cay; Nojahoda	Mansun; The Flaming Lips; Ultrasound; Luscious Jackson; Arab Strap; Fountains of Wayne; The Auteurs; The Living End; Grand Drive; Hefner; Toploader; Coldplay

=== Carling Premier stage ===
Liberty 37 (unknown position)

Reading Friday	Reading Saturday	Reading Sunday
Leeds Saturday	Leeds Sunday	Leeds Monday
Nashville Pussy; My Ruin; The Flys	Remy Zero; The Delgados; Cinerama	Smog; Subcircus; Cornelius

Also included Big Leaves, Black Box Recorder, Cha Cha Cohen, Chicks, Cube, Cyclefly, Dark Star, Dawn of the Replicants, Experimental Pop Band, The Jellys, Jim's Super Stereo World, Linoleum, Llama Farmers, Medal, Mercedes, The Motorhomes, Muse, Peeps Into Fairyland, Quasi, Rico, The Rocking Horses, Rosita, Seafood, Silt, Sonia Fariq, Stroke, Venni, The Webb Brothers, Witness

=== Dance stage ===
Reading Friday	Reading Saturday
Leeds Saturday	Leeds Sunday
Bentley Rhythm Ace; Lo Fidelity Allstars; Sugarhill Gang; Merz; Space Raiders; Cuba; Freddy Fresh; DeeJay Punk-Roc; Arling & Cameron; Moose	All Seeing I; Jurassic 5; GusGus; Breakbeat Era; Les Rhythmes Digitales; Indian Ropeman; μ-Ziq; Skinny; Surreal Madrid; Roni Size; Fantastic Plastic Machine; Dynamite MC; Miss Pink

=== Vans Warped Tour stage ===
Reading Sunday
Leeds Monday
- Ice-T
- Pennywise
- Blink-182
- Suicidal Tendencies
- The Pietasters
- Hepcat
- The Vandals
- Less Than Jake
- 7 Seconds
- Ignite
- Good Riddance

=== Notes ===
Orgy were due to open the Main Stage Reading Sunday/Leeds Monday, but pulled out days before the event. Lit filled in their spot.

== 2000 ==
=== Main stage ===
Reading Friday	Reading Saturday	Reading Sunday
Leeds Monday	Leeds Sunday	Leeds Saturday
Oasis; Primal Scream; Foo Fighters; The Bluetones; Limp Bizkit; Asian Dub Foundation; Doves; Boss Hog; Ooberman; Cotton Mather	Pulp; Beck; Gomez; Super Furry Animals; Deftones; Elastica; Idlewild; Gorky's Zygotic Mynci; The Delgados; Kent	Stereophonics; Placebo; Slipknot; Rage Against the Machine; Blink-182; Daphne and Celeste; A; The Supersuckers; Cay; My Vitriol

=== Radio 1 Evening Session stage ===
Reading Friday	Reading Saturday	Reading Sunday
Leeds Monday	Leeds Sunday	Leeds Saturday
Muse; Shed Seven; Ween; Grandaddy; Royal Trux; Clinic; Brassy; Amen; King Adora; Orange Can; The High Fidelity; The Lapse	Embrace; The Wannadies; Badly Drawn Boy; Graham Coxon; Black Box Recorder; Queens of the Stone Age; Dark Star; Terris; ...And You Will Know Us by the Trail of Dead; JJ72; The Get Up Kids; Crashland; Kustom Built	Ian Brown; Shack; Elliott Smith; Utah Saints; Les Rythmes Digitales; Lupine Howl; The Clint Boon Experience; Sleater-Kinney; The Animalhouse; Clearlake; The Crocketts; Action Spectacular

=== Dance stage ===
Reading Friday	Reading Saturday	Reading Sunday
Leeds Monday	Leeds Sunday	Leeds Saturday
Laurent Garnier; Ken Ishii; Plaid; Rinôçérôse; Alpinestars; BT; Dope Smugglaz; Zan Lyons; Arkarna	The Black Eyed Peas; Slum Village; Junkie XL; Saïan Supa Crew; Thomas Rusiak; Runaways; Creators; So Solid Crew	Red Snapper; Fila Brazillia; Mint Royale; Hooverphonic; Jacknife Lee; Lowfinger; Manchild; Sonic Animation; Psychonauts

=== Carling Premier stage ===
Reading Friday	Reading Saturday	Reading Sunday
Leeds Monday	Leeds Sunday	Leeds Saturday
Calexico; Dirty Three; Mojave 3; Dot Allison; Titan; Wilt; Ben & Jason; Grand Western; I Am Kloot; North Mississippi Allstars; Turin Brakes; Elbow; Robots In Disguise; Lindsay Thompson; Cleavage	Queens of the Stoneage; QueenAdreena; Katastrophy Wife; Medal; At the Drive-In; Aereogramme; Hank Williams III; Beachwood Sparks; Ben Christophers; Home; Co.uk; Little Hell; Fifth Amendment; Ben's Symphonic Orchestra; South	Babybird; Bellatrix; Laika; Lauren Laverne; Angelica; Bowling For Soup; Mellow; Contempo; Cousteau; Turn; AKA; It's Jo and Danny; Mohobishopi; The Kennedy Soundtrack (Only Reading)

=== Notes ===
Rage Against the Machine played their last UK gig at Reading before their break-up. They played their last gig three weeks later. Originally booked play on the mainstage Eminem had to pull out a few weeks prior for legal reasons in America. Elastica pulled out of their Leeds appearance.

== 2001 ==
=== Main stage ===
Reading Friday	Reading Saturday	Reading Sunday
Leeds Saturday	Leeds Sunday	Leeds Friday
Travis; Green Day; PJ Harvey; Iggy Pop; The Strokes; Eels; Run-D.M.C.; Lo Fidelity Allstars; The Living End; The Donnas	Manic Street Preachers; Fun Lovin' Criminals; Supergrass; Feeder; Rancid; Frank Black and the Catholics; ...And You Will Know Us by the Trail of Dead; OPM; Public Domain; Terris	Eminem (With D12); Marilyn Manson; Papa Roach; Queens of the Stone Age; The Cult; Xzibit (Leeds only); System of a Down; Fear Factory; Hed PE; Staind; Boy Hits Car

=== Radio 1 Evening Session stage ===
Reading Friday	Reading Saturday	Reading Sunday
Leeds Saturday	Leeds Sunday	Leeds Friday
Ash; Evan Dando; BS 2000; Amen; King Adora; Cosmic Rough Riders; Mull Historical Society; South; The Moldy Peaches; Crackout; Easyworld	Mogwai; Teenage Fanclub; My Vitriol; The Folk Implosion; Elbow; Gorky's Zygotic Mynci; Guided by Voices; Dislocated Styles; The Electric Soft Parade; Goldrush; The Zephyrs	Mercury Rev; Stephen Malkmus & The Jicks; Gene; Lowgold; Mark B & Blade; Alien Ant Farm; Grand Theft Audio; Seafood; Hundred Reasons; Murder City Devils; Biffy Clyro

=== The End Dance stage ===
Reading Friday	Reading Saturday	Reading Sunday
Leeds Saturday	Leeds Sunday	Leeds Friday
Green Velvet; Gary Numan; Richie Hawtin; Backyard Dog; DJ Erol; Mouse on Mars; Pepe Deluxé; Big Dog; Andy Votel; Original Bedroom Rockers; Ugly Duckling; Spek; Infinite Mass	See Concrete Jungle Stage	Grooverider; Wookie; Roots Manuva; Oxide & Neutrino; Freestylers; Regular Fries; Delinquent Habits; Kosheen; So Solid Crew; Ben Onono; Dee Kline

=== The Concrete Jungle stage ===
Reading Saturday
Leeds Sunday
- Rocket from the Crypt
- Reel Big Fish
- Good Riddance
- Snuff
- Mad Caddies
- Ignite
- Dropkick Murphys
- Shelter
- Capdown
- Save Ferris
- Linea 77
- Kids Near Water

=== Carling stage ===
Reading Friday	Reading Saturday	Reading Sunday
Leeds Saturday	Leeds Sunday	Leeds Friday
Arab Strap; The Posies; I Am Kloot; Mo Solid Gold; Proud Mary; Richard Hawley; American Hi-Fi; Hamell on Trial; Bright Eyes; Tahiti 80; Danny Cichuta; The Pattern; Little Hell; Ikara Colt; The Parkinsons	Backyard Babies; Lostprophets; Nebula; Defenestration; Anyone; The Cooper Temple Clause; Voy; Lift to Experience; Hell Is for Heroes; Skinny; Vex Red; Thirteen:13; Dirty Harry; Bridge & Tunnel	Hefner; Gay Dad; Clearlake; Cat Power; David Kitt; Ladytron; Godhead; Haven; Gloss; Electrelane; Fuzz Light Years; Hopewell; Mower; Redwood

=== Notes ===
This was the year that the Concrete Jungle Stage made its debut. Weekend tickets cost £80, day tickets £35. The Strokes were moved from the Radio One stage to the Main Stage.

== 2002 ==
=== Main stage ===
Reading Friday	Reading Saturday	Reading Sunday
Leeds Saturday	Leeds Sunday	Leeds Friday
The Strokes; Pulp; Jane's Addiction; Weezer; The White Stripes; The Dandy Warhols; Mercury Rev; The Soundtrack of Our Lives; The Moldy Peaches	Foo Fighters; Muse; Ash; Sum 41; The Hives; A; Less Than Jake; Andrew W.K.; Vex Red; Sahara Hotnights	Guns N' Roses (Leeds); The Prodigy; The Offspring; Slipknot; Incubus; NOFX; Puddle of Mudd; Hundred Reasons; Amen; Raging Speedhorn (Reading); The Dillinger Escape Plan

=== Radio 1 Evening Session stage ===
Reading Friday	Reading Saturday	Reading Sunday
Leeds Saturday	Leeds Sunday	Leeds Friday
Feeder; The Breeders; The Electric Soft Parade; The Vines; New Found Glory; Guided by Voices; Fenix TX; The Bellrays; The Von Bondies; Finch	Black Rebel Motorcycle Club; Jimmy Eat World; Blues Explosion; The Cooper Temple Clause; Rival Schools; Alec Empire; The Icarus Line; Goldfinger; Midtown; The Libertines; The Pattern	Spiritualized; ...And You Will Know Us by the Trail of Dead; Cornershop; Haven; Six by Seven; Reel Big Fish; The Shining; Sparta; Capdown; Hoggboy; Death Cab for Cutie

=== Third stage ===
Reading Friday	Reading Saturday	Reading Sunday
Leeds Saturday	Leeds Sunday	Leeds Friday
The Boutique Stage	Concrete Jungle Stage	Dance Stage
Aphex Twin; Luke Vibert; Lo Fidelity Allstars; UNKLE Sound Decks and Effects; Ladytron; Peaches; Dot Allison; Dog; Freq Nasty; Erol Alkan; Curley and Sherman DJs	Sick of It All; No Use for a Name; Saves the Day; Face to Face; The Get Up Kids; Spunge; The Bouncing Souls; Dashboard Confessional; Thursday; Hot Rod Circuit; The Anniversary; Lightyear; Jesse James	The Streets; The Herbaliser; Blade; People Under The Stairs; Blak Twang; Fallacy and Fusion; New Flesh; Andy C; First Rate DJ; DJ Noise; DJ Maley

=== Carling stage ===
Reading Friday	Reading Saturday	Reading Sunday
Leeds Saturday	Leeds Sunday	Leeds Friday
The Polyphonic Spree; Bobby Conn; The Reindeer Section; Cody Chesnutt; Princess Superstar; British Sea Power; The Kennedy Soundtrack; The Datsuns; Interpol; The Kills; Longwave; Simple Kid; Pretty Girls Make Graves	Ikara Colt; The Parkinsons; The (International) Noise Conspiracy; Span; Vendetta Red; Ben Kweller; The Eighties Matchbox B-Line Disaster; Cave In; The Beatings; The D4; Millionaire; Serafin; Vue; The Cognition	The Music; Alpinestars; Easyworld; Maximum Roach; Minuteman; Biffy Clyro; Hell Is for Heroes; Jetplane Landing; Dragpipe; Trik Turner; Tetra Splendour; ThisGirl

=== Notes ===
Guns N' Roses played only in Leeds as they had a prior touring commitment in London on the day of the Reading event. In Reading they were replaced by Raging Speedhorn who appeared much lower on the bill. A weekend ticket cost £90, a day ticket was £39. Reel Big Fish pulled out of Leeds for undisclosed reasons. Antipop Consortium cancelled their Dance Stage appearance after they disbanded earlier that month. Feeder were invited by Melvin Benn to headline the main stage on the first day at Reading and the second day at Leeds. They later turned this down, as they did not want to play such a high-profile slot so soon after the death of their drummer Jon Lee in January of that year. As a result, Feeder would instead headline the Radio 1 Evening Session Stage.

== 2003 ==
=== Main stage ===
Reading Friday	Reading Saturday	Reading Sunday
Leeds Saturday	Leeds Sunday	Leeds Friday
Linkin Park; Blink-182; Placebo; The Darkness; Staind; The Datsuns; Less Than Jake; Finch; Bowling for Soup; InMe	Blur; Black Rebel Motorcycle Club; Beck; Doves; The Streets; The Libertines; Junior Senior; Cave In; The Sleepy Jackson	Metallica; System of a Down; Sum 41; Primal Scream; Good Charlotte; The Used; The All-American Rejects; Biffy Clyro; Sugarcult

=== Radio 1 stage ===
Reading Friday	Reading Saturday	Reading Sunday
Leeds Saturday	Leeds Sunday	Leeds Friday
The Polyphonic Spree; Elbow; Interpol; Electric Six; Ladytron; Mull Historical Society; Alien Ant Farm; OK Go; Saves the Day; Young Heart Attack; Violent Delight	AFI; Hundred Reasons; The Cooper Temple Clause; The Mars Volta; The Thrills; The Kills; The Rapture; Jet; My Morning Jacket; Stellastarr; The Futureheads	The Music; Yeah Yeah Yeahs; Grandaddy; Hot Hot Heat; Hell Is for Heroes; The Eighties Matchbox B-Line Disaster; Radio 4; The Raveonettes; Serafin; Kinesis; The Applicators

=== Smirnoff Dance Arena ===
Reading Friday	Reading Saturday	Reading Sunday
Leeds Saturday	Leeds Sunday	Leeds Friday
Death in Vegas; Richard Fearless; Blackalicious; DM & Jemini; Amon Tobin; Scissor Sisters; Buck 65; My Computer	2 Many DJs; Audio Bullys; Adam F; The Spooks; Photek; Free*land; Gold Chains; Outlandish; Majesticons; Zongamin	Futureshock; Lamb; Mixologists and MC Trip; Squarepusher; Aphrodite; Just Jack; FC Kahuna; Blak Twang; Fat Truckers

=== The Concrete Jungle stage ===
Reading Saturday
Leeds Sunday
- Pennywise
- Lagwagon
- The Ataris
- Alkaline Trio
- Mad Caddies
- Turbonegro
- Boysetsfire
- The Movielife
- Poison the Well
- Thrice
- King Prawn
- Funeral for a Friend

=== Carling stage ===
Reading Friday	Reading Saturday	Reading Sunday
Leeds Saturday	Leeds Sunday	Leeds Friday
Evan Dando; Sparta; The Black Keys; Mclusky; The Hiss; Vue; Jackson; Bell X1; Rocket Science; Razorlight; Franz Ferdinand; Billy Talent; The Blueskins; Colour of Fire	Billy Bragg; Brendan Benson; The Bandits; The Buff Medways; Soledad Brothers; The Sights; The Sons; Ima Robot; The Revs; The Sun; Whirlwind Heat; The Go; The Agenda; The Real	British Sea Power; Manitoba; Hope of the States; Har Mar Superstar; Longview; Calla; Instruction; Winnebago Deal; The Stills; Keane; White Light Motorcade; Cardia; The Prosaics

=== Notes ===
Black Rebel Motorcycle Club played as a replacement for The White Stripes, who pulled out after Jack White was in a car crash with his then-girlfriend, Renée Zellweger. Although they played second on the Main Stage, it was billed as with Black Rebel Motorcycle Club, reflecting their smaller status. Jay-Z also pulled out, with The Darkness moving further up the bill to replace him. The Libertines were without Pete Doherty, who was at that time estranged from the band; he also missed their 2004 appearance. Other drop outs included Courtney Love, Lostprophets and Godsmack. A weekend ticket cost £95, a day ticket £40.

== 2004 ==
=== Main stage ===
Reading Friday	Reading Saturday	Reading Sunday
Leeds Saturday	Leeds Sunday	Leeds Friday
The Darkness; The Offspring; Ash; The Hives; The Distillers; Jurassic 5; Hundred Reasons; Reel Big Fish; Taking Back Sunday; Goldie Lookin Chain	The White Stripes; Morrissey; The Libertines; Franz Ferdinand; The Roots; New York Dolls; Razorlight; Thursday; Young Heart Attack; The 5.6.7.8's	Green Day; 50 Cent; Placebo; Lostprophets; The Streets; Dropkick Murphys; The Rasmus; Thrice; Minús

=== Radio 1 stage ===
Reading Friday	Reading Saturday	Reading Sunday
Leeds Saturday	Leeds Sunday	Leeds Friday
Super Furry Animals; Graham Coxon; Soulwax; Peaches; The Donnas; The Wildhearts; Modest Mouse; The (International) Noise Conspiracy; The Open; Mad Action	Funeral for a Friend; Dizzee Rascal; DKT/MC5; Stereolab; The Eighties Matchbox B-Line Disaster; The Ordinary Boys; Har Mar Superstar; The Icarus Line; The Bronx; Bloc Party; Read Yellow	Supergrass; The Von Bondies; Melissa Auf der Maur; British Sea Power; dEUS; 22-20s; The Stills; Dogs Die in Hot Cars; The Fiery Furnaces; The Futureheads; Eastern Lane

=== Dance Arena ===
Reading Friday	Reading Saturday	Reading Sunday
Leeds Saturday	Leeds Sunday	Leeds Friday
Roots Manuva; 2 Many DJs; NuMark; !!!; LCD Soundsystem; Shystie; Zoot Woman; Black Strobe; DJ Format & MC Abdominal; Blue States; Boom Boom Satellites; Bravecaptain	See Concrete Jungle Stage	Mike Patton and Rahzel; Ty; DJ Krush; Radio 4; Fingathing; Buck 65; Client; The Loose Cannons; Ivory; Chromeo; Roger

=== Concrete Jungle stage ===
Reading Saturday
Leeds Sunday
- A
- Sick of It All
- Goldfinger
- The Dillinger Escape Plan
- The Bouncing Souls
- Coheed and Cambria
- Avenged Sevenfold
- Flogging Molly
- Allister
- Alexisonfire
- The Holiday Plan
- Fireapple Red

=== Carling stage ===
Reading Friday	Reading Saturday	Reading Sunday
Leeds Saturday	Leeds Sunday	Leeds Friday
Kasabian; Mclusky; Danko Jones; Living Things; My Red Cell; Pretty Girls Make Graves; The Departure; The Subways; Terra Diablo; Pink Grease; The Glitterati; Infrasound; The Real	Mark Lanegan; Mondo Generator; Roxy Saint; Blanche; Le Tigre; The Features; TV on the Radio; The Duke Spirit; Do Me Bad Things; The 45's; Autolux; Agent Blue; Riff Random; Mohair; Tat	The Kills; The Soundtrack of Our Lives; Devendra Banhart; The Others; Amplifier; The Secret Machines; The Cribs; Sons and Daughters; The Golden Virgins; Madrugada; yourcodenameis:milo; 10,000 Things; Mr. Mojo

=== Notes ===
On the Radio 1 Stage, the Super Furry Animals headlined on the Leeds Saturday, with Graham Coxon second. This order was reversed when the bands played the Reading Friday. New Found Glory pulled out a few weeks before the festival. A weekend ticket cost £105, a day ticket £45.

== 2005 ==
=== Main stage ===
Reading Friday	Reading Saturday	Reading Sunday
Leeds Saturday	Leeds Sunday	Leeds Friday
Pixies; The Killers; Queens of the Stone Age; The Coral; Elbow; Graham Coxon; Dropkick Murphys; The Wedding Present; Goldie Lookin Chain; Do Me Bad Things	Foo Fighters; Kings of Leon; Razorlight; The Charlatans; Dinosaur Jr.; Roots Manuva; Biffy Clyro; The All-American Rejects; From Autumn to Ashes	Iron Maiden; Marilyn Manson; Incubus; Iggy and The Stooges; NOFX; Funeral for a Friend; Alkaline Trio; Turbonegro; My Chemical Romance (Leeds); Bullet for My Valentine (Reading)

=== NME/Radio 1 Stage ===
Reading Friday	Reading Saturday	Reading Sunday
Leeds Saturday	Leeds Sunday	Leeds Friday
Kasabian; Black Rebel Motorcycle Club; The Cooper Temple Clause; My Chemical Romance (Reading); Bullet for My Valentine (Leeds); Fightstar; The Subways; Death from Above 1979; The Dead 60s; The Blood Brothers; yourcodenameis:milo; The Black Velvets	The Tears; Babyshambles; Arcade Fire; Hot Hot Heat; The Kills; The Others; Juliette and the Licks; Nine Black Alps; The Cribs; The Longcut; Editors; Louis XIV	Bloc Party; The Futureheads; LCD Soundsystem; British Sea Power; The Duke Spirit; Maxïmo Park; Hal; Sons and Daughters; The Rakes; Towers of London; Art Brut; Boy Kill Boy

=== Dance Arena ===
Reading Friday	Reading Saturday	Reading Sunday
Leeds Saturday	Leeds Sunday	Leeds Friday
Lemon Jelly; Audio Bullys; Fort Minor; Kano; DJ Format featuring Abdominal and D-Sisive; Dreadzone; Ralph Myerz and the Jack Herren Band; Performance; Infadels; Akala; Bedouin Soundclash	See Radio 1 Lock-Up Stage	Mylo; M.I.A; Blackalicious; Four Tet; Buck 65; VHS or Beta; Hot Chip; T. Raumschmiere; The Modern

=== Radio 1 Lock-Up Stage ===
Reading Saturday
Leeds Sunday
- Hatebreed
- Bad Religion
- Anti-Flag
- Rise Against
- Eighteen Visions
- Dwarves
- Capdown
- Million Dead
- Emanuel
- The Explosion
- Senses Fail
- NoComply

=== Carling stage ===
Reading Friday	Reading Saturday	Reading Sunday
Leeds Saturday	Leeds Sunday	Leeds Friday
Ladytron; Charlotte Hatherley; Saul Williams; The National; Mando Diao; The Paddingtons; We Are Scientists; The Blood Arm; Cherubs; Two Gallants; The Rogers Sisters; Thirsty Merc; Fell City Girl; Puscha	The Go! Team; The Raveonettes; Sleater-Kinney; Caesar; Be Your Own Pet; Yeti; Dogs; Arctic Monkeys; Mystery Jets; 747s; Clor; Youth Group; Puggy	Echo & the Bunnymen; Adam Green; Engineers; Amusement Parks on Fire; Komakino; The Rifles; Battle; Young Offenders Institute; Test Icicles; Every Move a Picture; Gratitude; The Crimea; ¡Forward, Russia!; Beautiful People

=== Notes ===
In 2005 My Chemical Romance played Reading and Leeds on the same day, in an alteration from the original schedule, due to the MTV Video Music Awards. The Transplants were originally booked to play the festivals but pulled out in mid-August due to illness. Jimmy Eat World also pulled out due to other commitments. Other drop outs included Willy Mason, Simple Plan and Fall Out Boy (also due to the VMAs). A weekend ticket cost £125, a day ticket £60.

== 2006 ==
=== Main stage ===
Reading Friday	Reading Saturday	Reading Sunday
Leeds Saturday	Leeds Sunday	Leeds Friday
Franz Ferdinand; Kaiser Chiefs; Yeah Yeah Yeahs; Belle & Sebastian; Fall Out Boy; The Subways; Panic! at the Disco; Dashboard Confessional; Fightstar; Towers of London	Muse; Arctic Monkeys; The Streets; Feeder; Dirty Pretty Things; The Futureheads; The Cribs; Wolfmother; Flogging Molly; Aiden	Pearl Jam; Placebo; My Chemical Romance; Slayer; Bullet for My Valentine; Less Than Jake; Taking Back Sunday; Killswitch Engage; Mastodon

=== Radio 1 stage ===
Reading Friday	Reading Saturday	Reading Sunday
Leeds Saturday	Leeds Sunday	Leeds Friday
Primal Scream; Dizzee Rascal; The Vines; The Secret Machines; Mystery Jets; Peaches; Gogol Bordello; Guillemots; The Long Blondes; Fields; Duels	The Raconteurs; Coheed and Cambria; Jet; Clap Your Hands Say Yeah; The Fall; The Automatic; Be Your Own Pet; Milburn; Plan B; Giant Drag; 747s	Maxïmo Park; The Rakes; The Kooks; Boy Kill Boy; Broken Social Scene; Goldie Lookin Chain; Hope of the States; The Dresden Dolls; ¡Forward, Russia!; Tapes 'n Tapes; Metric; The Marshals

=== Dance Arena ===
Reading Sunday
Leeds Friday
- Soulwax (Nite Versions Set – live)
- Vitalic (live)
- 2 Many DJs
- Headman (DJ set, Reading only)
- Erol Alkan (Leeds only)
- Coldcut
- Lady Sovereign
- Sway
- Spank Rock
- Shitdisco
- Superthriller

=== Radio 1 Lock-Up Stage ===
Reading Friday	Reading Saturday
Leeds Saturday	Leeds Sunday
Sick of It All; Thursday; Body Count; Hundred Reasons; The Bouncing Souls; Rise Against; Boysetsfire; Lightyear; Municipal Waste; Send More Paramedics; The King Blues	Reel Big Fish; Anti-Flag; Millencolin; Flogging Molly; Alexisonfire; Hawthorne Heights; Against Me!; Capdown; The Bled; Captain Everything!; Adequate Seven; Sonic Boom Six

=== Carling stage ===
Reading Friday	Reading Saturday	Reading Sunday
Leeds Saturday	Leeds Sunday	Leeds Friday
Bedouin Soundclash; The Twilight Singers; Eagles of Death Metal; Howling Bells; Bromheads Jacket; The Sunshine Underground; Little Man Tate; Get Cape. Wear Cape. Fly; Field Music; Scissors For Lefty; The Pigeon Detectives; ZOX; Mumm-Ra	Nouvelle Vague; The Fratellis; TV on the Radio; The View; The Like; The Spinto Band; Noisettes; The Morning After Girls; Tilly and the Wall; The Rumble Strips; Serena Maneesh; The Maccabees; GoodBooks	Animal Collective; Hot Chip; Larrikin Love; Klaxons; Lethal Bizzle; STATIK; The Research; Good Shoes; Semifinalists; You Say Party! We Say Die!; Humanzi; Switches; The On Offs; Kharma 45

=== Nokia Tent ===
Reading Saturday
Modern Clichés

=== Notes ===
Shortly after the first line-up announcement, Feeder and Yeah Yeah Yeahs switched days, meaning that Yeah Yeah Yeahs would play Reading on Friday and Leeds on Saturday, and that Feeder would play Reading on Saturday and Leeds on Sunday. Audioslave pulled out of their slot due to the band being busy recording new material, The Shins pulled out for undisclosed reasons, and From First to Last pulled out due to the then lead singer (Sonny Moore) needing throat surgery, Paramore had to pull out because their singer (Hayley Williams) had throat problems and were replaced by Sonic Boom Six lower in the bill. Story of the Year and Bleeding Through also pulled out for undisclosed reasons. Flogging Molly played twice at both festivals, once in the punk tent and once on the main stage. Tickets were £135 for a weekend ticket and £60 for a day ticket.

== 2007 ==
=== Main stage ===
Reading Friday	Reading Saturday	Reading Sunday
Leeds Saturday	Leeds Sunday	Leeds Friday
Razorlight; Kings of Leon; Interpol; Maxïmo Park; Jimmy Eat World; Gossip; Gogol Bordello; The Long Blondes; Little Man Tate; The Pipettes	Red Hot Chili Peppers; Arcade Fire; Bloc Party; Panic! at the Disco; Angels & Airwaves; The Shins; Eagles of Death Metal; The Dead 60s; Paramore	Smashing Pumpkins; Nine Inch Nails; Lostprophets; Fall Out Boy; Funeral for a Friend; The Used; Billy Talent; Hellogoodbye; Gym Class Heroes

=== Radio 1 stage ===
Reading Friday	Reading Saturday	Reading Sunday
Leeds Saturday	Leeds Sunday	Leeds Friday
Ash; Brand New; The Subways; Enter Shikari; Get Cape. Wear Cape. Fly; The Enemy; The Horrors; Aiden; Sparta; The Sounds; The Scare	The View; We Are Scientists; Biffy Clyro; The Twang; Dinosaur Jr.; The Pigeon Detectives; Young Knives; Nine Black Alps; Good Shoes; Noisettes; Brakes; Dogs	Klaxons; LCD Soundsystem; CSS; Jamie T; Devendra Banhart; Cold War Kids; The Maccabees; The Sunshine Underground; New Young Pony Club; Hadouken!; Pull Tiger Tail; Late of the Pier

=== The Dance Arena ===
Reading Saturday
Leeds Sunday
- UNKLE
- !!!
- Digitalism
- Datarock
- Lethal Bizzle
- Shy Child
- Metronomy
- dan le sac vs Scroobius Pip
- Does It Offend You, Yeah?
- Crystal Castles
- The Teenagers

=== Radio 1 Lock-Up Stage ===
Reading Friday	Reading Sunday
Leeds Saturday	Leeds Friday
Jimmy Eat World; The Living End; Mad Caddies; The Bronx; Capdown; Big D and the Kids Table; Plain White T's; The Draft; Street Dogs; The King Blues; Riverboat Gamblers; The Grit	New Found Glory; Turbonegro; Gallows; Against Me!; From Autumn to Ashes; Dwarves; Cancer Bats; The Casualties; Ignite; Municipal Waste; Sonic Boom Six; The Ghost of a Thousand

=== The Carling stage ===
Reading Friday	Reading Saturday	Reading Sunday
Leeds Saturday	Leeds Sunday	Leeds Friday
Albert Hammond, Jr.; Patrick Wolf; Jack Peñate; Cajun Dance Party; Reverend and The Makers; 1990s; Alberta Cross; Frank Turner; Blood Red Shoes; Manchester Orchestra; Hooks For Hands (Kaiser Chiefs) (Leeds Only); Turbofruits; Ripchord; Bombay Bicycle Club	Hot Hot Heat; The Academy Is...; Battles; Silversun Pickups; Shiny Toy Guns; Tokyo Police Club; Cobra Starship; Foals; Director; Mutemath; Kids in Glass Houses; LostAlone; Eisley; Pete & The Pirates	The Hold Steady; Peter Bjorn and John; Seasick Steve; Charlotte Hatherley; Kate Nash; The Little Ones; Kubichek!; Operator Please; Republic of Loose; I Was a Cub Scout; Saki Cult; Stalkers

=== Notes ===
Kaiser Chiefs played a secret slot on the Carling Stage at the Leeds leg of the event under the pseudonym of 'Hooks for Hands'. Peeping Tom were due to perform on the dance stage, but pulled out. +44 also dropped out. A weekend ticket cost £145 (plus a maximum of £7 booking fee).

== 2008 ==
The line-up for the Reading and Leeds 2008 festivals was announced on 31 March 2008, and tickets were made available thereafter.

=== Main stage ===
Reading Friday	Reading Saturday	Reading Sunday
Leeds Saturday	Leeds Sunday	Leeds Friday
Rage Against the Machine; Queens of the Stone Age; The Fratellis; The Enemy; Biffy Clyro; Serj Tankian; Dizzee Rascal; Taking Back Sunday; Get Cape. Wear Cape. Fly; Anti-Flag	The Killers; Bloc Party; The Raconteurs; Editors; We Are Scientists; Dirty Pretty Things; The Subways; British Sea Power; The Automatic; The Blackout	Metallica; Tenacious D; Feeder; Avenged Sevenfold (Leeds only); Dropkick Murphys; Plain White T's; Alexisonfire; Mindless Self Indulgence; Bring Me the Horizon

=== Radio 1/NME Stage ===
Reading Friday	Reading Saturday	Reading Sunday
Leeds Saturday	Leeds Sunday	Leeds Friday
Babyshambles; The Wombats; Vampire Weekend; MGMT; Jack Peñate; One Night Only; The Duke Spirit; Be Your Own Pet; Blood Red Shoes; Pete & The Pirates; Future of the Left	Manic Street Preachers; Bullet for My Valentine; Justice; Foals; Seasick Steve; The Ting Tings; Mystery Jets; Santigold; Joe Lean & The Jing Jang Jong; Kids in Glass Houses; Bombay Bicycle Club	The Cribs; The Last Shadow Puppets; Conor Oberst and the Mystic Valley Band; Pendulum; The Music; Hadouken!; Lightspeed Champion; Cajun Dance Party; Adam Green; Yeasayer; The Metros

=== Festival Republic stage ===
Reading Friday	Reading Saturday	Reading Sunday
Leeds Saturday	Leeds Sunday	Leeds Friday
Dan le sac vs Scroobius Pip; Does It Offend You, Yeah?; Late of the Pier; The Teenagers; Friendly Fires; Ida Maria; Aimee Braines; Esser; White Denim; Florence and the Machine; Fighting with Wire; These New Puritans; Jubilee; TeenagersInTokyo; Biffy Clyro (Reading Only – Live Lounge special)	Elliot Minor; The Audition; Los Campesinos!; All Time Low; You Me at Six; Black Kids; Louis XIV; White Lies; Twisted Wheel Club; Fight Like Apes; Black Acid; Lovvers; Collapsing Cities	The Kills; Wiley; Glasvegas; Cage the Elephant; The Rascals; Emmy the Great; Johnny Foreigner; Black Tide; In Case of Fire; Wild Beasts; Natty

=== The Dance Arena ===
Reading Sunday
Leeds Friday
- CSS
- Digitalism
- Simian Mobile Disco
- Chromeo
- Crystal Castles
- Lethal Bizzle
- Holy Fuck
- The Whip
- Robots in Disguise
- The Death Set
- The Shoes

=== Radio 1 Lock-Up Stage ===
Reading Friday	Reading Saturday
Leeds Saturday	Leeds Sunday
Less Than Jake; Pennywise; Anti-Flag; Goldfinger; Tiger Army; The Unseen; H_{2}O; Frank Turner; The Briggs; The Loved Ones; Blackhole (band); Hexes	Gallows; Alkaline Trio; Thrice; Flogging Molly; MxPx; Cancer Bats; The King Blues; Fucked Up; The Gaslight Anthem; Hifi Handgrenades; Random Hand

=== Alternative stage ===
- Henry Rollins
- Jeffrey Lewis
- Phill Jupitus
- Michael McIntyre
- Robin Ince
- doktor cocacolamcdonalds

=== BBC Introducing Stage ===
BBC Introducing Stage
- Attack Attack!
- The Bacchae
- The Cherry Cob Cartel
- Darlins
- Be The SplitScreen
- Dinosaur Pile Up
- Eureka Machines
- Fangs
- FFERS
- Flashguns
- Fox Cubs
- General Fiasco
- The Humour
- Hungry Ghosts: Concur
- Ipsum Facto
- The Joy Formidable
- Kid ID
- The Last People on Earth
- Loqui
- The Maybes
- The New York Fund
- Out of Animals
- Our Fold
- Pulled Apart by Horses
- Razzmatazz Lorry Excitement
- Situationists
- Skeletons
- Sole
- Islocus
- That Fucking Tank
- These Monsters
- Thomas Tantrum
- Tiger Shadow
- Tripwires

=== Notes ===
- The festival ran from Friday 22 – Sunday 24 August 2008. Weekend tickets cost £155. Day tickets cost £65.
- Set Your Goals pulled out of the festival. Alkaline Trio pulled mainland festival appearances but still appeared at Reading/Leeds.
- The Pigeon Detectives appeared on the Dance to the Radio Stage (an alias for the BBC Introducing Stage in reference to their label) on Thursday 21st at the Leeds Site.
- Slipknot pulled out of the festival after drummer Joey Jordison broke his ankle. Feeder were their replacement as far as the slot was concerned, as almost every act below them were moved up a slot, with Bring Me the Horizon being booked instead, although not taking their slot and being at the bottom of the schedule.
- Avenged Sevenfold performed a shortened set at Leeds and pulled out of the Reading leg due to illness. Due to the short notice, they were not replaced and the schedule was re-arranged. This meant Mindless Self Indulgence playing before Feeder, although this not an official 4th and are still retroactively listed as the second band to play.

== 2009 ==
=== Main stage ===
Reading Friday	Reading Saturday	Reading Sunday
Leeds Sunday	Leeds Friday	Leeds Saturday
Kings of Leon; Kaiser Chiefs; Placebo; Fall Out Boy; Deftones; Funeral for a Friend; New Found Glory; Alexisonfire; Madina Lake; Sonic Boom Six	Arctic Monkeys; The Prodigy; Maxïmo Park; Ian Brown; The Courteeners; Enter Shikari; Eagles of Death Metal; The Rakes; Fightstar; Mariachi El Bronx	Radiohead; Bloc Party; Yeah Yeah Yeahs; Vampire Weekend; Brand New; The View; The Living End; Noah and the Whale; Kids in Glass Houses

=== Radio 1/NME Stage ===
Reading Friday	Reading Saturday	Reading Sunday
Leeds Sunday	Leeds Friday	Leeds Saturday
Faith No More; Jamie T; Friendly Fires; Florence and the Machine; Jack Peñate; The Horrors; Little Boots; The Airborne Toxic Event; The Virgins; Manchester Orchestra; Dananananaykroyd	Gossip; Glasvegas; White Lies; The Maccabees; You Me at Six; Them Crooked Vultures; Patrick Wolf; Metric; Spinnerette; Delphic; Dinosaur Pile-Up	Lostprophets; AFI; Gallows; The Gaslight Anthem; Crystal Castles; Passion Pit; Metronomy; Frank Turner; Lethal Bizzle; In Case of Fire; Broadway Calls

=== Lock Up Stage/Dance Arena ===
Reading Friday	Reading Saturday	Reading Sunday
Leeds Sunday	Leeds Friday	Leeds Saturday
Billy Talent; Anti-Flag; Alexisonfire; The Bouncing Souls; Leftöver Crack; The Aggrolites; Streetlight Manifesto; Fake Problems; Riverboat Gamblers; The Flatliners; The Ghost of a Thousand; The Plight	Rise Against; Thursday; The Bronx; Mad Caddies; Rival Schools; Set Your Goals; Snuff; Municipal Waste; A Wilhelm Scream; Chuck Ragan; Polar Bear Club; The Computers	Deadmau5; Vitalic; MSTRKRFT; Chase & Status; Lady Sovereign; The Crystal Method; The Qemists; Das Pop (Reading Only); Mixhell (Leeds Only); Chipmunk; 3OH!3; Master Shortie; L'Amour La Morgue

=== Festival Republic stage ===
Reading Friday	Reading Saturday	Reading Sunday
Leeds Sunday	Leeds Friday	Leeds Saturday
Marmaduke Duke; Soulsavers with Mark Lanegan; Black Lips; Bombay Bicycle Club; The Big Pink; Fight Like Apes; A Place to Bury Strangers; Jack's Mannequin; The Temper Trap; Amazing Baby; Sweethead; Single File; Middleman	The Blackout; Bring Me the Horizon; Atreyu; 65daysofstatic; Go:Audio; Hockey; Middle Class Rut; Marina and the Diamonds; The Chapman Family; Baddies; Detroit Social Club; Pulled Apart by Horses; Skint And Demoralised	La Roux; Lightspeed Champion; The Rumble Strips; White Denim; Golden Silvers; The Hot Rats; Broken Records; Grammatics; Magistrates; The Joy Formidable; The xx; Titus Andronicus; Bear Hands

=== The Alternative stage ===
Comedy: Doug Stanhope, Tim Minchin, Brendon Burns, Jack Whitehall, Junior Simpson, Sarah Millican, Tom Stade, Hugh Lennon, MC Matt Read, MC Martin Bigpig, Steve Gribbin, Kevin Bridges, Holly Walsh, Stephen Grant, Markus Birdman, Stuckey & Murray, Jessica Delfino, Dan Nightingale, Gary Delaney, Mark Olver, Daniel Townes, MC Dave Twentyman, Joey Page, Doc Brown, Jamie Kilstein, Joe Bor, Tomb.

Spoken Word: Aidan Moffat, The PeteBox, Kae Tempest, Mik Artistik, John Berkavitch

Debate: ID Instigate Debate

Late Night Entertainment: Smash N' Grab, Swap-A-Rama, Transgressive Records

Film: Le Donk screening plus Q&A session with Mark Herbert and special guests from the film, 3D Night Of The Living Dead, This Is Spinal Tap, Anvil! The Story of Anvil.

=== Dance to the Radio stage ===
Leeds Thursday
- Blood Red Shoes
- Wild Beasts
- Bear Hands
- Airship
- Holy State

=== Notes ===
- The festival ran from Friday 28 August 2009 – Sunday 30 August 2009. Weekend tickets cost £175. Day tickets cost £70.
- Alexisonfire and The Bronx (band) played two sets at both Reading and Leeds – one on the Main Stage and one later in the day on the Lock Up stage.
- A Day to Remember cancelled their appearance on the Festival Republic stage.
- A schedule gap on the Radio1/NME stage on the Friday at Leeds and Saturday at Reading was filled by a surprise appearance by Them Crooked Vultures.

== 2010 ==
The line-up for the Reading and Leeds 2010 festivals was announced on 29 March 2010, and tickets were made available thereafter.

=== Main stage ===
Reading Friday	Reading Saturday	Reading Sunday
Leeds Sunday	Leeds Friday	Leeds Saturday
Guns N' Roses; Queens of the Stone Age; Biffy Clyro; Lostprophets; NOFX; Gogol Bordello; Billy Talent; A Day to Remember; Young Guns	Arcade Fire; The Libertines; Dizzee Rascal; The Cribs; The Maccabees; Modest Mouse; The Gaslight Anthem; Mystery Jets; The Futureheads; The Walkmen	Blink-182; Paramore; Weezer; Cypress Hill; Limp Bizkit; You Me at Six; All Time Low; Thrice; The King Blues; Motion City Soundtrack

=== NME/Radio 1 Stage ===
Reading Friday	Reading Saturday	Reading Sunday
Leeds Sunday	Leeds Friday	Leeds Saturday
LCD Soundsystem; Phoenix; Mumford & Sons; Delphic; Yeasayer; The Big Pink; Two Door Cinema Club; Girls; New Young Pony Club; Surfer Blood; Frankie & The Heartstrings	Pendulum; Enter Shikari; Crystal Castles; Serj Tankian; Frank Turner; Kids In Glass Houses; Hadouken!; 3oh!3; Band of Skulls; Everything Everything; Rolo Tomassi	Klaxons; We Are Scientists; Foals; Band of Horses; Kele Okereke; The Drums; Wild Beasts; Los Campesinos!; Local Natives; The Joy Formidable; Goldheart Assembly

=== Lock-Up Stage/Dance Arena ===
Reading Friday	Reading Saturday	Reading Sunday
Leeds Sunday	Leeds Friday	Leeds Saturday
Alkaline Trio; Sick of It All; Against Me!; Hatebreed; Streetlight Manifesto; Strike Anywhere; This Is Hell; Civet; The Skints; Crazy Arm	Bad Religion; NOFX (Secret Set – Reading Only); The Get Up Kids; Cancer Bats; Zebrahead; Trash Talk; Gallows (Billed As 'The Rats'); Paint It Black; Off With Their Heads; Cerebral Ballzy; Random Hand; Moral Dilemma	Roots Manuva (Co-Headliner); Rusko (DJ Set); Magnetic Man (Co-Headliner); Sub Focus (DJ Set); Metronomy; Four Tet; Chiddy Bang; Holy Fuck; Health; Japanese Popstars (Withdrew from Reading); Lights; L'Amour La Morgue (Leeds Only)

=== Festival Republic stage ===
Reading Friday	Reading Saturday	Reading Sunday
Leeds Sunday	Leeds Friday	Leeds Saturday
Marina and the Diamonds; The Sunshine Underground; Blood Red Shoes; Adam Green; Warpaint; Avi Buffalo; Egyptian Hip Hop; Pulled Apart by Horses; Summer Camp; Funeral Party; Harlem; The Cheek; Gaggle	Ash; Atari Teenage Riot; The Black Angels; Giggs; Darwin Deez; Chapel Club; Villagers; I Blame Coco; Freelance Whales; Chief; Yuck; The Crookes	British Sea Power; Caribou; One Night Only; Minus the Bear; Tame Impala; The Like; Free Energy; Fool's Gold; General Fiasco; Sound of Guns; Foxy Shazam; Goldhawks; Kassidy

=== Notes ===
- Miike Snow pulled out for undisclosed reasons, with The Joy Formidable replacing them.
- Fight Like Apes and Alberta Cross pulled out of their slots due to undisclosed reasons.
- RX Bandits pulled out due to 'unavoidable family circumstances with Cerebral Ballzy replacing them.
- Crime In Stereo pulled out due to the band splitting up, with Random Hand replacing them.

== 2011 ==
The line-up for the Reading and Leeds 2011 festivals was announced on 21 March 2011, and tickets were made available thereafter.

=== Main stage ===
Reading Friday	Reading Saturday	Reading Sunday
Leeds Saturday	Leeds Sunday	Leeds Friday
My Chemical Romance; Thirty Seconds to Mars; The Offspring; Deftones; Rise Against; Bring Me the Horizon; New Found Glory; The Blackout; Architects	The Strokes (Headlining Reading); Pulp (Headlining Leeds); The National; Jimmy Eat World; Madness; Two Door Cinema Club; Seasick Steve; The Pigeon Detectives; The Joy Formidable	Muse; Elbow; Interpol; Friendly Fires; Enter Shikari; The View; Frank Turner; Taking Back Sunday; We Are the Ocean

=== NME/Radio 1 Stage ===
Reading Friday	Reading Saturday	Reading Sunday
Leeds Saturday	Leeds Sunday	Leeds Friday
Beady Eye; White Lies; Noah and the Whale; The Vaccines; Metronomy; Patrick Wolf; The Naked and Famous; Mona; Miles Kane; Frankie & The Heartstrings; Pulled Apart By Horses	Jane's Addiction (Cancelled); Crystal Castles; Bombay Bicycle Club; Glassjaw; Everything Everything; The Kills; OFWGKTA (Reading Only); Edward Sharpe and the Magnetic Zeros; Yuck; Funeral Party	2manydjs; The Streets; Death From Above 1979; Panic! At The Disco; Warpaint; Chapel Club; Cage The Elephant; Best Coast; Fucked Up; Dananananaykroyd

=== Lock-Up Stage/Dance Stage ===
Reading Friday	Reading Saturday	Reading Sunday
Leeds Saturday	Leeds Sunday	Leeds Friday
Unkle; Simian Mobile Disco; Nero (DJ set); Sub Focus; SBTRKT (DJ set); Devlin; Crystal Fighters; Mount Kimbie; Does It Offend You, Yeah?; Cold Cave; D/R/U/G/S	The Mighty Mighty Bosstones; The King Blues; The Bronx; Capdown; Leftöver Crack; Comeback Kid; Boysetsfire; Street Dogs; Letlive; Teenage Bottlerocket; Title Fight; Sharks	Descendents; Flogging Molly; Frank Turner; Face to Face; Hot Water Music; Bedouin Soundclash; Off!; The Black Pacific; The Menzingers; Your Demise; Spycatcher; Fighting Fiction

=== Festival Republic stage ===
Reading Friday	Reading Saturday	Reading Sunday
Leeds Saturday	Leeds Sunday	Leeds Friday
The Horrors; Digitalism; Tom Vek; White Denim; Anna Calvi; The Antlers; Foster the People; Cerebral Ballzy; Dry the River; Royal Bangs; The Computers; Islet; Mini Mansions; Cherri Bomb	The Midnight Beast; Rival Schools; And So I Watch You From Afar; Smith Westerns; Cloud Control; Cults; Mariachi El Bronx; Grouplove; Tribes; Big Deal; The Coopers; Young the Giant (Cancelled); She Keeps Bees	Peter Doherty; Viva Brother; Ed Sheeran; Young Legionnaire; CocknBullKid; Twin Atlantic; Fight Like Apes; Benjamin Francis Leftwich; Little Comets; Dutch Uncles; Nightbox; Flats; Romance

=== Notes ===
Weekend tickets cost £192.50 before booking fees. Pulp headlined over The Strokes at the Leeds Festival. Mouthwash pulled out due to the split up of the band, they were replaced by Fighting Fiction. The Twilight Singers pulled out and were replaced by Young Legionnaire. OFWGKTA pulled out of the Leeds Festival due to the 2011 MTV Video Music Awards, but still performed at the Reading Festival. Jane's Addiction were due to headline the NME/Radio 1 Stage but cancelled both their appearances at the last minute – after arriving at the Reading site – due to frontman Perry Farrell falling ill. Rise Against played a secret acoustic set on the BBC Introducing Stage at Reading after their mainstage slot.

== 2012 ==
The initial line-up announcements for the festivals were made on 12 March 2012 – with the tickets made available for purchase shortly afterwards.

=== Main stage ===
Reading Friday	Reading Saturday	Reading Sunday
Leeds Saturday	Leeds Sunday	Leeds Friday
The Cure; Paramore; Bombay Bicycle Club; You Me at Six; Crystal Castles; Angels & Airwaves; Coheed and Cambria; Cancer Bats; Deaf Havana	Kasabian; Florence and the Machine; The Vaccines; Enter Shikari; The Shins; OFWGKTA; Mystery Jets; Blood Red Shoes; Los Campesinos!	Foo Fighters; The Black Keys; Kaiser Chiefs; Bullet for My Valentine; All Time Low; The Gaslight Anthem; Eagles of Death Metal; Band of Skulls; Pulled Apart by Horses

=== NME/Radio 1 Stage ===
Reading Friday	Reading Saturday	Reading Sunday
Leeds Saturday	Leeds Sunday	Leeds Friday
The Maccabees; Foster the People; The Courteeners; Graham Coxon; Passion Pit; The Blackout; The Hives; Spector; Friends; Hadouken!; Future of the Left	At the Drive-In; The Cribs; Mastodon; Billy Talent; Miike Snow; Santigold; Dry The River; Twin Atlantic; Pure Love; Post War Glamour Girls; Green Day (Secret set, Reading only)	Justice; Two Door Cinema Club; The Horrors; SBTRKT; Mark Lanegan Band; The Joy Formidable; Tribes; Django Django; Howler; Of Monsters and Men

=== Festival Republic stage ===
Reading Friday	Reading Saturday	Reading Sunday
Leeds Saturday	Leeds Sunday	Leeds Friday
Sleigh Bells; The Subways; Veronica Falls; Bastille; Niki & the Dove; Alt-J; Lucy Rose; We Are Augustines; JEFF the Brotherhood; Savages; Fidlar; Palma Violets; O'Brother; Funeral Suits	Bassnectar (DJ Set); Feeder; Young Guns; Lower Than Atlantis; We Are the In Crowd; Dog Is Dead; Jake Bugg; Don Broco; Oberhofer; The Knux; Citizens!; Theme Park; The Minutes	The View; The Futureheads (A-Capella & Acoustic); Benjamin Francis Leftwich; King Charles; 2:54; Zulu Winter; S.C.U.M; Alberta Cross; Iceage; DZ Deathrays; Toy; Deap Vally; The Cast of Cheers; L.A.

=== Lock Up/Dance Stage ===
Lock-Up	Dance Stage	Lock-Up
Reading Friday	Reading Saturday	Reading Sunday
Leeds Saturday	Leeds Sunday	Leeds Friday
Social Distortion; Anti-Flag; Every Time I Die; The Bouncing Souls; Saves the Day; Touche Amore; A Wilhelm Scream; Ceremony; Random Hand; Dead To Me; Star Fucking Hipsters; Pettybone	Metronomy; Katy B; Carl and the Drug Squad; Azealia Banks; Jaguar Skills; Modestep; Feed Me; Grimes; Japanese Popstars; Clement Marfo & The Frontline; Jagga; DJ Zinc	Less Than Jake; Me First and the Gimme Gimmes; Gallows; Turbonegro; Trash Talk; Good Riddance; The Skints; Polar Bear Club; This Is Hell; Möngöl Hörde; The Flatliners; Apologies, I Have None; Crowns

=== Notes ===
- Chiddy Bang pulled out of the festival due to touring commitments, and were replaced by Hadouken!
- Here We Go Magic pulled out of the festival for undisclosed reasons. Their replacement was Future of the Left.
- Green Day played a secret gig at Reading Festival.

== 2013 ==
=== Main stage ===
Reading Friday	Reading Saturday	Reading Sunday
Leeds Saturday	Leeds Sunday	Leeds Friday
Green Day; System of a Down; Deftones; Frank Turner; Bring Me the Horizon; New Found Glory; Skindred; While She Sleeps	Eminem; Chase & Status; Foals; White Lies; Twin Atlantic; EarlWolf; The Blackout; Lower Than Atlantis; Mallory Knox	Biffy Clyro; Nine Inch Nails; Fall Out Boy; The Lumineers; Editors; Don Broco; Hadouken!; We Are the In Crowd; Bury Tomorrow

=== NME/Radio 1 Stage ===
Reading Friday	Reading Saturday	Reading Sunday
Leeds Saturday	Leeds Sunday	Leeds Friday
Skrillex; ASAP Rocky; Major Lazer; Bastille; Frightened Rabbit; Peace; FIDLAR; Deap Vally; Kodaline; Night Engine; Dry the River	Alt-J; Jake Bugg; Tame Impala; Imagine Dragons; Johnny Marr; Palma Violets; Modestep; Deaf Havana; Darwin Deez; Theme Park; Childhood	Phoenix; Azealia Banks; Disclosure; City and Colour; HAIM; Alex Clare; Tribes; AlunaGeorge; Villagers; Wavves; Dinosaur Pile-Up

=== BBC Radio 1 Dance stage ===
Reading Friday	Reading Saturday	Reading Sunday
Leeds Saturday	Leeds Sunday	Leeds Friday
Sub Focus; Fenech-Soler; Friction; Alvin Risk; Clean Bandit; Is Tropical; Bondax; Robert DeLong; Parachute Youth	Magnetic Man; A-Trak; Flux Pavilion; Redlight; Jagwar Ma; Willy Moon; Big Black Delta; Post War Years; Night Works	Knife Party; Baauer; Dillon Francis; Charli XCX; Pegboard Nerds; Fred V & Grafix; Bag Raiders; Jacob Plant; Bipolar Sunshine; Stay Positive; Duologue

=== Lock Up/Rock Stage ===
Reading Friday	Reading Saturday	Reading Sunday
Leeds Saturday	Leeds Sunday	Leeds Friday
Alkaline Trio; The Living End; Rx Bandits; Quicksand; Feed the Rhino; The Computers; Cerebral Ballzy; The Creepshow; Rat Attack; Palm Reader; Gnarwolves	Tomahawk; Sick of It All; The Bronx; King Prawn; Sonic Boom Six; Off with Their Heads; Chuck Ragan; Anti Vigilante; Sharks; Crowns; Great Cynics; Decade	Shikari Sound System; Funeral for a Friend; Gallows; Uncle Acid & the Deadbeats; Filter; And So I Watch You From Afar; Crossfaith; Arcane Roots; Heaven's Basement; Hacktivist; The Virginmarys; Beware of Darkness; Hawk Eyes; Bloody Knees

=== Festival Republic stage ===
Reading Friday	Reading Saturday	Reading Sunday
Leeds Saturday	Leeds Sunday	Leeds Friday
Crystal Fighters; Chvrches; Surfer Blood; The Strypes; Kate Nash; Temples; MØ; MS MR; Half Moon Run; Parquet Courts; Papa; Charlie Boyer and The Voyeurs; Findlay; MMX	British Sea Power; Savages; Lucy Rose; Tim Burgess; Splashh; The 1975; Swim Deep; Drenge; SKATERS; Balthazar; To Kill a King; Dan Croll; Sons & Lovers	Mount Kimbie; Spector; The Jim Jones Revue; Pure Love; Merchandise; Frankie and The Heartstrings; Chapel Club; California X; Twenty One Pilots; The Family Rain; In the Valley Below; China Rats; San Cisco; Battle Lines

=== BBC Radio 1Xtra stage ===
Reading Friday	Reading Saturday	Reading Sunday
Leeds Saturday	Leeds Sunday	Leeds Friday
Wiley; Toddla T Sound; P Money; Left Boy; Stylo G; Itch; Nathan Flutebox Lee & The Clinic; Scrufizzer; Murkage; Benin City	Devlin; Action Bronson; Giggs; Chance the Rapper; DJ Semtex; Mic Righteous; Lunar C; Broke'N'£nglish; Etta Bond X Raf Riley	Wretch 32; Angel Haze; Ms Dynamite; David Rodigan; Mikill Pane; Ghostpoet; Context; Knytronium; Smiler

=== Notes ===
- The latest announcements to the 2013 Reading and Leeds festival were made on Tuesday, 4 June 2013 on Radio 1
- Reading and Leeds 2013 presale tickets went on sale on 30 August 2012. Weekend tickets were made available on 30 November 2012 at a price of £202.50 (plus an £8 booking fee). Day tickets cost £90.00 (plus a £7 booking fee).
- Early entry tickets for the Reading site sold out on 17 June 2013. On 5 July 2013, Saturday day tickets for the Reading site sold out. On 12 July 2013, Friday day tickets for the Reading site sold out. On 23 July 2013, weekend tickets for the Reading site sold out. On 13 August 2013, Sunday tickets sold out, meaning at the Reading site, the full weekend was sold out. On 17 August 2013, Friday tickets for the Leeds site sold out.
- On 27 June 2013, Brand New, who were due to play on the Main Stage announced that they were cancelling their August European dates including their performances at the Reading and Leeds Festivals. They were replaced by EarlWolf.
- Iggy Azalea cancelled in order to attend the MTV Video Music Awards.
- Due to illness, DIIV were forced to cancel Reading and Leeds performances.

== 2014 ==
=== Main stage ===
Reading Friday	Reading Saturday	Reading Sunday
Leeds Saturday	Leeds Sunday	Leeds Friday
Queens of the Stone Age (Headlining Reading); Paramore (Headlining Leeds); Vampire Weekend; Enter Shikari; Jimmy Eat World; Deaf Havana; Blood Red Shoes; Crossfaith; Hacktivist	Arctic Monkeys; Jake Bugg; Imagine Dragons; Foster the People; The Hives; Peace; Dry the River; Pulled Apart By Horses; Gnarwolves	Blink-182; Macklemore & Ryan Lewis; You Me at Six; A Day to Remember; Sleeping with Sirens; Papa Roach; Young Guns; Tonight Alive; The Story So Far

=== NME/Radio 1 Stage ===
Reading Friday	Reading Saturday	Reading Sunday
Leeds Saturday	Leeds Sunday	Leeds Friday
Courteeners; Metronomy; SBTRKT; Warpaint; Temples; Twin Atlantic; Mallory Knox; Drenge; La Dispute; Red Fang; Gerard Way	Closing set from Nero LIVE; Bombay Bicycle Club; Chvrches; Die Antwoord; Don Broco; Cage the Elephant; Lower Than Atlantis; Royal Blood; Marmozets; Lonely the Brave; DZ Deathrays	Disclosure; The 1975; The Horrors; The Kooks; Schoolboy Q; Maverick Sabre; Clean Bandit; Jungle; The Neighbourhood; Twin Shadow; The Wytches

=== BBC Radio 1 Dance stage ===
Reading Friday	Reading Saturday	Reading Sunday
Leeds Saturday	Leeds Sunday	Leeds Friday
Netsky Live!; Crucified Barbara; Steve Jackson; Trainwreck; Sigma; SecondCity; Indiana; Rufus; Panama; We Are Evergreen; Nightbox	Pendulum DJ Set; Andy C; Gesaffelstein; The Glitch Mob; Borgore; Adventure Club; Jacob Plant; Kove; MØ; Milky Chance; Tea Street Band	Flume; Klaxons; Boys Noize; Bondax; Ben Pearce; Breach; Snakehips; Zinc; Electric Youth; Lxury; Billon

=== The Pit/Lock Up ===
Reading Friday	Reading Saturday	Reading Sunday
Leeds Saturday	Leeds Sunday	Leeds Friday
Jimmy Eat World; Brody Dalle; The Skints; Touche Amore; Eagulls; The Front Bottoms; Slaves; Dave Haus; Misty Miller; Munchie Girls	Of Mice & Men; Architects; Issues; While She Sleeps; We Came As Romans; Marmozets; Wovenwar; Basement; Brutality Will Prevail; Lesser Key; Empress AD; The Hell; Beasts	Gogol Bordello; Möngöl Hörde; letlive.; Every Time I Die; The Wonder Years; A Wilhelm Scream; The Flatliners; Neck Deep; Baby Godzilla; Masked Intruder; Pup; Emily's Army; Blacklist Royals; Vales

=== Festival Republic stage ===
Reading Friday	Reading Saturday	Reading Sunday
Leeds Saturday	Leeds Sunday	Leeds Friday
Palma Violets; Bipolar Sunshine; Childhood; Jamie T (Secret set, Reading only); King Charles; Catfish and the Bottlemen; The Orwells; Sweethead; Fat White Family; Darlia; The Districts; Hudson Taylor; Southern; LTNT; The Minutes	Band of Skulls; We Are Scientists; The Amazing Snakeheads; Circa Waves; Hozier; Wolf Alice; Bear Hands; Marika Hackman; American Authors; Nico Vega; Little Matador; X Ambassadors; Leaders of Men	Augustines; Mayday Parade; The Sunshine Underground; The Pains of Being Pure at Heart; Sivu; Drowners; Dolomite Minor; The Bohicas; Lucius; Saint Raymond; The Royal Concept; Flyte; Baby Strange; Carnabells

=== Radio 1Xtra stage ===
Reading Friday	Reading Saturday	Reading Sunday
Leeds Saturday	Leeds Sunday	Leeds Friday
Giggs; I Am Legion; David Rodigan MBE; MistaJam; P Money; Lizzo; Sinéad Harnett; Dirty Dike; Edward Scissortongue	Pusha T; Krept and Konan; Meridian Dan; Dominique Young Unique; Tempa T; Little Simz; Newham Generals; Aidan Coker	Danny Brown; Joey Bada$$; Vic Mensa; Kwabs; Elli Ingram; Hawk House; Sasha Keable; Raleigh Ritchie; My Nu Leng; Bad Rabbits; Tinashe

== 2015 ==
=== Main stage ===
Reading Friday	Reading Saturday	Reading Sunday
Leeds Saturday	Leeds Sunday	Leeds Friday
Mumford & Sons; Alt-J; Bastille; All Time Low; Panic! at the Disco; Palma Violets; Drenge; Neck Deep; Mariachi El Bronx	Metallica; Bring Me the Horizon; Royal Blood; Alexisonfire; Pierce the Veil; Modestep; Marmozets; FIDLAR; Babymetal	The Libertines; Kendrick Lamar; Jamie T; The Maccabees; The Cribs; The Gaslight Anthem; Against Me!; Lonely the Brave; Feed The Rhino

=== NME/Radio 1 Stage ===
Reading Friday	Reading Saturday	Reading Sunday
Leeds Saturday	Leeds Sunday	Leeds Friday
Knife Party (Closing set); Limp Bizkit; Run The Jewels; Peace; Swim Deep; Don Broco; American Football; Parquet Courts; Echosmith; The Districts; The Struts	Rebel Sound; Twin Atlantic; Catfish and the Bottlemen; Everything Everything; Wolf Alice; Circa Waves; Spector; Slaves; Foals (secret set); Twin Peaks; Nothing but Thieves	Deadmau5; Gorgon City; Years & Years; Jamie xx; Glass Animals; Kwabs; Awolnation; Ghostpoet; Shura; The Skints

=== BBC Radio 1 Dance stage ===
Reading Friday	Reading Saturday	Reading Sunday
Leeds Saturday	Leeds Sunday	Leeds Friday
Wilkinson Live; Camo & Krooked; Hannah Wants; Dillon Francis; Porter Robinson; Jacob Plant; My Nu Leng; Toyboy & Robin; Hayden James; Ferdinand Weber; All We Are; Cardiknox	MK; Oliver Dollar; Charli XCX; Tourist; DJ Fresh; Secondcity; Dimension X Kove; Elliphant; Ben Khan; FTSE; The Riptide Movement	Boy Better Know; Hudson Mohawke; Brodinski presents Brava; Blonde Live; Rustie; Evian Christ; Maribou State Live; Snakehips; TCTS; 99 Souls; Petite Meller; The Six

=== The Pit/Lock Up ===
Reading Friday	Reading Saturday	Reading Sunday
Leeds Saturday	Leeds Sunday	Leeds Friday
New Found Glory; Simple Plan; The Bronx; Modern Life is War; Bo Ningen; The Menzingers; The Smith Street Band; Skinny Lister; The Bots; Youth Man; God Damn; Youth Man; VANT	The Mini Band; Ghost; Gojira; Atreyu; Pvris; Baroness; And So I Watch You From Afar; As It Is; No Devotion; Black Peaks; Ho99o9; The One Hundred	Refused; While She Sleeps; Cancer Bats; Frnkiero and the Cellabration; Bury Tomorrow; Beartooth; Frank Carter & The Rattlesnakes; Turbowolf; Moose Blood; Queen Kwong; Hawk Eyes; Single Mothers; Black Foxxes; Fort Hope (band)

=== Festival Republic stage ===
Reading Friday	Reading Saturday	Reading Sunday
Leeds Saturday	Leeds Sunday	Leeds Friday
Django Django; Alvvays; Prides; Bear's Den; Vaults; Joywave; Little May; Eliza and the Bear; Jake Isaac; Sunset Sons; Hunter & The Bear; The Bulletproof Bomb	The Wombats; Lucy Rose; Ash; Darlia; Seether; Radkey; Pretty Vicious; DMA's; Blossoms; Rat Boy; Bad Breeding; Neon Waltz; San Fermin; Walking on Cars; Hunck	Frank Turner; Little Comets; Manchester Orchestra; We Are the Ocean; Coasts; Jack Garratt; Spring King; Mini Mansions; Gengahr; Hippo Campus; Sundara Karma; Black Honey; The Last Internationale; The Sherlocks

=== BBC Radio 1 Xtra stage ===
Reading Friday	Reading Saturday	Reading Sunday
Leeds Saturday	Leeds Sunday	Leeds Friday
A$AP Ferg; FLATBUSH ZOMBiES; Rae Sremmurd; Oneman; Pell; Star.One with Ping-Pong; Siobhan Bell; Bugzy Malone; DJ Target	Azealia Banks; Lethal Bizzle; Ms Dynamite; Vince Staples; Tempa T; Craze; Loyle Carner; Kiko Bun; Nick Brewer; Remi Miles	Krept & Konan; Stormzy; Young Thug; Dope D.O.D.; Fekky; Ratking; Isiah Dreads; Lady Leshurr

=== Notes ===
Tyler, the Creator had originally been booked to play on the NME Stage, but was forced to cancel these shows after being refused entry into the United Kingdom. Modern Baseball had planned to play the Lock Up Stage, but withdrew the week before the festival due to the lead singer's decision to focus on tackling his depression. Mastodon had originally been booked to headline the Pit stage, but pulled out when they cancelled their European tour, citing a 'personal family matter.' It was later revealed that this was due to bassist Troy Sanders' wife being diagnosed with breast cancer.

== 2016 ==
=== Main stage ===
Reading Friday	Reading Saturday	Reading Sunday
Leeds Saturday	Leeds Sunday	Leeds Friday
Foals (Headlining Reading); Disclosure (Headlining Leeds); Chvrches; Boy Better Know; Die Antwoord; Lower Than Atlantis; Nothing But Thieves; Frank Carter and The Rattlesnakes; Frank Turner	Red Hot Chili Peppers; Imagine Dragons; Courteeners; Eagles of Death Metal; Slaves; Parkway Drive (Reading only); Judas (Leeds only); Skindred; Clutch; Sundara Karma	Biffy Clyro; Fall Out Boy; The Vaccines; A$AP Rocky (Reading only); Five Finger Death Punch; Sleeping With Sirens; Coheed and Cambria; The Virginmarys; State Champs

=== NME/Radio 1 Stage ===
Reading Friday	Reading Saturday	Reading Sunday
Leeds Saturday	Leeds Sunday	Leeds Friday
Jack Ü; Twenty One Pilots; Crystal Castles; The Neighbourhood; The Internet; Giggs; Mura Masa; Hinds; Hælos; Fickle Friends	Two Door Cinema Club; Nas; Krept & Konan; Jack Garratt; Sigma; Netsky; Blossoms; Whitney; Highly Suspect; Sunset Sons	The 1975; The Wombats; Cage The Elephant; Savages; Rat Boy; Half Moon Run; Tonight Alive; Deaf Havana; Spring King; Basement; Black Foxxes

=== BBC Radio 1 Dance stage ===
Reading Friday	Reading Saturday	Reading Sunday
Leeds Saturday	Leeds Sunday	Leeds Friday
Oliver Heldens; Hannah Wants; Alunageorge; Philip George; Danny L Harle; Tkay Maidza; Lion Babe; 99 Souls; Hermitude	Duke Dumont; Disciples; My Nu Leng with DJ Oneman & Dread MC; Riton; Sophie; Birdy Nam Nam; Lemaitre; Zac Samuel; Rag'n'Bone Man; The Japanese House	DJ EZ; David Rodigan; MistaJam; Friction; Jauz; Fred V & Grafix; Redlight; Low Steppa; Delta Heavy; James Organ

=== The Pit/Lock Up ===
Reading Friday	Reading Saturday	Reading Sunday
Leeds Saturday	Leeds Sunday	Leeds Friday
Asking Alexandria; Thrice; Crossfaith; Hacktivist; Nothing More; Dinosaur Pile-Up; Citizen; Superheaven; Creeper; FVK; Swmrs	Mastodon; The Dillinger Escape Plan; Kvelertak; Giraffe Tongue Orchestra; Milk Teeth; HECK; Ghost Town; Dead!; Big Spring	Good Charlotte; The King Blues; Machine Gun Kelly; Arcane Roots; Modern Baseball; Roam; Beach Slang; Waterparks; Greywind; Strange Bones; Fighting Caravans

=== Festival Republic stage ===
Reading Friday	Reading Saturday	Reading Sunday
Leeds Saturday	Leeds Sunday	Leeds Friday
Maxïmo Park; Pulled Apart By Horses; Rationale; Luh; Blaenavon; The Sherlocks; Lewis Del Mar; Otherkin; Anteros; Transviolet; Banners; White Miles; Area 52	Brian Fallon and The Crowes; White Room; Låpsley; King Gizzard & the Lizard Wizard; Palace; Vant; The Hunna; Lany; Seratones; Inheaven; Tuff Love; The Beach; Beach Baby	The Temper Trap; Third Eye Blind; BØRNS; DMA's; Eagulls; Clean Cut Kid; Gnash; Ezra Furman; The Magic Gang; The Vryll Society; Will Joseph Cook; Issac Gracie; Tibet

=== Radio 1Xtra stage ===
Reading Friday	Reading Saturday	Reading Sunday
Leeds Saturday	Leeds Sunday	Leeds Friday
Wiley; Protoje; Little Simz; Maverick Sabre; Charlie Sloth; Baauer; Troyboi; Mick Jenkins; Lady Leshurr; Geko; K.Flay	Stormzy; Section Boyz; Logic; DJ Semtex (Reading only); Bugzy Malone; Anderson .Paak & The Free Nationals; The Range; Metro Boomin; Rejjie Snow; Rude Kid; Clara Amfo	Kano; Yung Lean; Hoodie Allen; Big Narstie; Fekky; Raleigh Ritchie; Yungen; Franko Fraize; Kiko Bun; Sneakbo; Astroid Boys

=== Notes ===
Parkway Drive had pulled out of Leeds due to 'family issues', this meant that Skindred played for a full hour while a new band called Judas played the rest of the time slot. A$AP Rocky pulled out of Leeds festival at the last possible moment due to travel problems. He was however capable to perform at Reading. Fetty Wap was due to play on the NME stage, but had to pull out from doctors orders due to a severe ear infection. HAIM were supposed to play on the NME stage but cancelled their European tour to focus on finishing their second album. G-Eazy who was one of the headliners for the Radio 1Xtra stage pulled out of the festival for unforeseen circumstances, and was replaced by Wiley. Travis Scott was also a headliner for the Radio 1Xtra stage, cancelled all remaining UK tour shows also due to unforeseen circumstances, he was replaced by Stormzy. Tyler Joseph of Twenty One Pilots was pulled down into the crowd during their performance of "Car Radio", at Reading 2016 and their set was cut short.

== 2017 ==
=== Main stage ===
Reading Friday	Reading Saturday	Reading Sunday
Leeds Saturday	Leeds Sunday	Leeds Friday
Kasabian; Bastille; Two Door Cinema Club; Jimmy Eat World; Circa Waves; Rat Boy; Mallory Knox; Deap Vally; Judas	Eminem; Major Lazer; Korn; At The Drive-In; Migos; PVRIS; The Pretty Reckless; Moose Blood; Honeyblood	Muse; Liam Gallagher; Blossoms; Giggs; Architects; Against the Current; VANT; PINS; The Xcerts

=== NME/Radio 1 Stage ===
Reading Friday	Reading Saturday	Reading Sunday
Leeds Saturday	Leeds Sunday	Leeds Friday
You Me at Six; Queens of the Stone Age (Secret set); Tory Lanez; Sub Focus Live; Lethal Bizzle; Anne-Marie; Oh Wonder; Declan McKenna; The Orwells; The Magic Gang; Marika Hackman; Lea Porcelain	Flume; Glass Animals; Everything Everything; Loyle Carner; Sundara Karma; Frank Carter & The Rattlesnakes; Marmozets; Tom Misch Live; Cabbage; Inheaven; Blaenavon; King No One	Haim; Halsey; Mura Masa; Wiley; Milky Chance; Ray BLK; The Sherlocks; Pond; SG Lewis; Fickle Friends; Mutemath; X Ambassadors

=== BBC Radio 1 Dance stage ===
Reading Friday	Reading Saturday	Reading Sunday
Leeds Saturday	Leeds Sunday	Leeds Friday
FatBoy Slim; Dillon Francis; Shy FX; Chris Lorenzo; Kurupt FM; Heartless Crew; Majestic; Metrik; TOKiMONSTA; Dreem Teem; Mullally; Haus	Andy C; Noisia 'Outer Edges'; High Contrast; Goldie; Jax Jones; Jaguar Skills; Delta Heavy; Becky Hill; LANY; Alma; Sigrid; Get Inuit	Marshmello; Charli XCX; MistaJam; Claptone; CamelPhat; Sam Divine; Monki; Jacob Plant; Matrix & Futurebound b2b Loadstar; Kideko; James Organ; Star.One

=== The Pit/Lockup ===
Reading Friday	Reading Saturday	Reading Sunday
Leeds Saturday	Leeds Sunday	Leeds Friday
Billy Talent; The Amity Affliction; Arcane Roots; Boston Manor; Tigers Jaw; Counterfeit; WSTR; God Damn; Puppy; Palisades; Freak; Life	While She Sleeps; One Ok Rock; Carpenter Brut; Turbowolf; Astroid Boys; Defeater; Vukovi; Zeal & Ardor; Tigercub; Viagra Boys; Casey; Dream State	Neck Deep; Breaking Benjamin; Gnarwolves; The Prettyboys; Tired Lion; Culture Abuse; Muncie Girls; Fizzy Blood; Sløtface; RavenEye; Baby in Vain; Heir

=== Festival Republic stage ===
Reading Friday	Reading Saturday	Reading Sunday
Leeds Saturday	Leeds Sunday	Leeds Friday
Bear's Den; Cigarettes After Sex; Jagwar Ma; The Districts; Toothless; Off Bloom; Cosima; The Big Moon; IDLES; Louis Berry; The Amazons; Prose; Yonaka; Barns Courtney (Reading only)	Black Lips; Japandroids; The View; Shame; Grouplove; Black Honey; Eden; The Japanese House; Pumarosa; All Tvvins; Superfood; Indigo Lo; Paris Youth Foundation; Wolf Alice (Secret Set)	The Hunna; Tom Grennan; Ash; Phantogram; Vallis Alps; Picture This; Will Joseph Cook; Mondo Cozmo; King Nun; Otherkin; Ten Tonnes; Saint Phnx; Outlya

=== BBC Radio 1Xtra stage ===
Reading Friday	Reading Saturday	Reading Sunday
Leeds Saturday	Leeds Sunday	Leeds Friday
Danny Brown; MIST; Rejjie Snow; Angel; P Money; Avelino; Lunice; Watsky; Akala; Father; Big Tobz; Fekky; Yung Fume	Flatbush ZOMBiES; Russ; AJ Tracey; Stefflon Don; Abra Cadabra; 67; Cadet; DJ Semtex (Reading only); Mic Righteous; Geovarn; Not3s; Bossman Birdie	Bugzy Malone; Dave; MoStack; J Hus; Vince Staples; THEY.; The Heatwave; The Manor; Young T & Bugsey; Lotto Boyzz; Jaykae; Monster Florence; The LaFontaines

=== Notes ===
The band PWR BTTM were lined-up to perform on The Lock Up stage, but after allegations went viral that band member Ben Hopkins had initiated sexual abuse, the festival pulled them from the line up. Several artists dropped out of Reading & Leeds for currently unknown reasons, this included Bishop Briggs, Katy B, A2 and K.I.D. On the first day of the festival, Royal Republic, who were the opening act on the main stage for Friday at Leeds, cancelled for personal reasons, they were replaced by the Xcerts. Don Broco performed on The Lock Up stage under the name 'The Prettyboys' as a secret set. Queens of the Stone Age and Wolf Alice also had secret sets at the festival.

== 2018 ==
=== Main stage ===
Reading Friday	Reading Saturday	Reading Sunday
Leeds Saturday	Leeds Sunday	Leeds Friday
Fall Out Boy; Travis Scott; The Kooks; The Wombats; Post Malone; Creeper; Waterparks; The Regrettes; Big Shaq (Reading only)	Kendrick Lamar; Panic! at the Disco; N*E*R*D; Dua Lipa; Sum 41; Mike Shinoda; Skindred; Protoje; Trash Boat	Kings of Leon; Courteeners; The Vaccines; J Hus; Krept & Konan; Shame; Billy Talent; The Joy Formidable; Dinosaur Pile-Up

=== Radio 1 stage ===
Reading Friday	Reading Saturday	Reading Sunday
Leeds Saturday	Leeds Sunday	Leeds Friday
Wolf Alice; Nothing But Thieves; MIST; The Blaze; IAMDDB; The Front Bottoms; Maggie Rogers; Fickle Friends; Bring Me the Horizon (secret set); SWMRS; Rae Morris; Sounds Like A Storm	Netsky b2b Jauz b2b Slushii; Pendulum; Deaf Havana; Wizkid; Rex Orange County; Sigrid; BROCKHAMPTON; Alma; Chase Atlantic; West Thebarton	Diplo; Slaves; Don Broco; Lil Pump; Wilkinson Live; DMA's; NF; Let's Eat Grandma; Marsicans; Twisted Wheel

=== BBC Radio 1 Dance stage ===
Reading Friday	Reading Saturday	Reading Sunday
Leeds Saturday	Leeds Sunday	Leeds Friday
Annie Mac; Bicep Live; Kölsch; Elderbrook; Shadow Child; KDA; Madam X; Bülow; Jimothy Lacoste; Gengahr	Alan Walker; TQD; Fred V & Grafix Live; Sonny Fodera; Danny Howard; Eli Brown; Mason Maynard; Hilltop Hoods; Noname; Now, Now	Hannah Wants; My Nu Leng; The Magician; Jax Jones Live; Riton & Kah-Lo; A-Trak; Mr Eazi; Charlie Sloth; AJR; Monarchy; Get Cape. Wear Cape. Fly

=== The Pit/The Lock Up ===
Reading Friday	Reading Saturday	Reading Sunday
Leeds Saturday	Leeds Sunday	Leeds Friday
Underoath; The Used; La Dispute; Royal Republic; Trophy Eyes; I The Mighty; The Fever 333 (Reading Only); The Xcerts; The Faim; Thunderpussy; Petrol Girls	Papa Roach; Beartooth; $uicideboy$; Black Peaks; Blood Youth; Nothing, Nowhere; METZ; Shvpes; I Dont Know How but They Found Me; Man with a Mission; Ecca Vandal; Love Zombies; Teenage Wrist	Hollywood Undead; The Bronx; Stray From The Path; Scarlxrd; Lowlives; Black Foxxes; Milk Teeth; Normandie; Frank Carter & The Rattlesnakes (Secret Set); Bexey; Sleep Token; Black Futures; Lady Bird

=== Festival Republic stage ===
Reading Friday	Reading Saturday	Reading Sunday
Leeds Saturday	Leeds Sunday	Leeds Friday
The Horrors; Death from Above; Bad Sounds; Hudson Taylor; Børns; The Night Café; Dream Wife; Ten Tonnes; King Nun; Easy Life; Touts; Annabel Allum (Reading only)	Kate Nash; The Magic Gang; Spring King; Yungblud; Otherkin; Pale Waves; HMLTD; Sunflower Bean; Sea Girls; Pretty Vicious; Bloxx; Wyvern Lingo	Tom Grennan; Isaac Gracie; Lewis Capaldi; Hinds; The Glorious Sons; Spector; Hippo Campus; Welshly Arms; Sam Fender; Hak Baker; Coin; Demob Happy; Husky Loops

=== BBC Radio 1 Xtra stage ===
Reading Friday	Reading Saturday	Reading Sunday
Leeds Saturday	Leeds Sunday	Leeds Friday
Nines; Kojo Funds; Fredo; Belly; Sheck Wes; Ocean Wisdom; Steel Banglez; Ms Banks; Skengdo & AM; Suspect; Fekky; D-Block Europe; Romzy; Bobii Lewis	Wretch 32; Yungen; Yxng Bane; A Boogie wit da Hoodie; Sneakbo; A2; DJ Semtex (Reading only); Lisa Mercedez; Lizzo; DJ Target; Izzie Gibbs	AJ Tracey; Lady Leshurr; Bhad Bhabie; Hardy Caprio; Nadia Rose; Ghetts; Scarlxrd; Ebenezer; 23 Unofficial; Bryn; Last Night In Paris; Headie One; Reece Parkinson (DJ Set)

Skepta was billed to headline the Radio 1 tent on Sunday but was removed from the lineup, with "logistical issues" being cited as the reason. He was not replaced, but Diplo was bumped up to headline rather than sub the stage. Other notable removals were Ski Mask The Slump God who pulled out due to touring commitments and was replaced by Bhad Bhabie and Brunswick who was also due to play the Dance Stage but was replaced by Madam X, Skinny Girl Diet were due to open the Radio 1 Stage on Sunday but were replaced by Twisted Wheel, Famous Dex was to play the Radio 1 Stage on Sunday but pulled out and Playboi Carti cancelled not long before the festival for personal reasons. He was due to perform on the Radio 1 Stage.

== 2019 ==
=== Main stage ===
Reading Friday	Reading Saturday	Reading Sunday
Leeds Saturday	Leeds Sunday	Leeds Friday
The 1975; Royal Blood; The Wombats; You Me At Six; Juice Wrld; Charli XCX; Twin Atlantic; I Dont Know How but They Found Me; Kawala	Post Malone (Co-headlining); Twenty One Pilots (Co-headlining); Blossoms; Anderson .Paak and the Free Nationals; Billie Eilish; AJ Tracey; The Hunna; Against the Current; Alma; Counterfeit	Foo Fighters; A Day to Remember; Frank Carter and the Rattlesnakes; The Distillers; Enter Shikari; Yungblud; Mayday Parade; SWMRS; Milk Teeth

=== Radio 1 stage ===
Reading Friday	Reading Saturday	Reading Sunday
Leeds Saturday	Leeds Sunday	Leeds Friday
Dave; Fredo; Circa Waves; Pale Waves; Joji; Hayley Kiyoko; Clairo; The Night Café; Mini Mansions; Sea Girls; Bloxx	Mura Masa; Mabel; Stefflon Don; Pvris; Roddy Ricch; Nav; Aitch; Slowthai; Boston Manor; Pip Blom; Cassia (Reading only)	Bastille; Chvrches; Sundara Karma; Lil Baby; Gunna; The Amazons; Machine Gun Kelly; The Story So Far; Picture This; The Faim; Childcare; Mantra (Reading only)

=== BBC Radio 1 Dance stage ===
Reading Friday	Reading Saturday	Reading Sunday
Leeds Saturday	Leeds Sunday	Leeds Friday
CamelPhat; Fisher; Dillon Francis; Prospa; Tough Love; Distruction Boyz (Reading only); Becky Hill; Loud Luxury; Allan Rayman; The LaFontaines	Andy C; SASASAS; Dimension; Muzzy; Crucast; Jaguar Skills; Georgia; Barny Fletcher; The Compozers & Friends (Reading only)	Denis Sulta; Honey Dijon; Mella Dee; Amy Becker; Holy Goof; Anti Up; James Organ; Kim Petras; Everyone You Know

=== The Pit/The Lock Up ===
Reading Friday	Reading Saturday	Reading Sunday
Leeds Saturday	Leeds Sunday	Leeds Friday
Bowling for Soup; The Maine; PUP; Laura Jane Grace & The Devouring Mothers; Puppy; Dream State; Press Club; Patent Pending; Cemetery Sun; In Your Prime	Ghostemane; Of Mice And Men; Paris; Poppy; Blood Youth; Dinosaur Pile-Up; Bad Nerves; Higher Power; Queen Zee	Enter Shikari; Fidlar; Palaye Royale; Nothing,Nowhere; Stand Atlantic; Hot Milk; White Reaper; Plague Vendor

=== Festival Republic stage ===
Reading Friday	Reading Saturday	Reading Sunday
Leeds Saturday	Leeds Sunday	Leeds Friday
Hobo Johnson & The LoveMakers; The Chats; Ten Tonnes; Hockey Dad; Black Honey; Twisted Wheel; The Sherlocks; Jeremy Zucker; Bad Child; Dreamers; No Rome; Ocean Alley; Zuzu	Peace; Hoodie Allen; Night Riots; Sports Team; Two Feet; Bleached; The Japanese House; Pink Sweat$; Sophie And The Giants; Belako; Oddity Road; Sons of Raphael	Crystal Fighters; Basement; Bakar; Cavetown; Anteros; Himalayas; Valeras; The Snuts; Moontower; Æ MAK; Vistas

=== BBC Radio 1 Xtra stage ===
Reading Friday	Reading Saturday	Reading Sunday
Leeds Saturday	Leeds Sunday	Leeds Friday
Dappy; Headie One; Deno; M Huncho; DigDat; Scarlxrd; DJ Grevious; Tiffany Calver; Just Banco; MTRNICA	Octavian; D-Block Europe; Maleek Berry; Saint Jhn; K-Trap; Bexey; DJ Target; DaniLeigh; Tyla Yaweh; Truemendous	Not3s; DaBaby; NSG; Tion Wayne; YBN Nahmir; Tommy Genesis; Big Heath; Blade Brown (Leeds only); Kenny Allstar; DDG; Miraa May; Scuti

=== Notes ===
English indie rock band Blaenavon was to be a headlining act on the Festival Republic Stage, but on 20 June pulled out due to 'on-going health issues'. Crystal Fighters was announced as their replacement. G Flip, who was also due to perform on the Festival Republic Stage, also pulled out of the festivals for unknown reasons. UK drill rapper Loski has also been removed from the line-up. This may be because the rapper was arrested for being in possession with a firearm. Fellow UK drill rapper Unknown T was also removed after he was charged with murder and violent disorder after allegedly stabbing 20-year-old Steven Narvaez-Jara during a party. Geko was also supposed to perform on Radio 1Xtra Stage. It is unknown why he was removed. Brunswick who was also due to play on the Radio 1 Stage last year, was pulled from the line up again this year for unknown reasons. Two days before his performance at Leeds, Lil Uzi Vert pulled out of the festival for 'unforeseen circumstances'. Acts were pushed up, Yungblud and Mayday Parade swapped places, and SWMRS was upgraded from Festival Republic to the Main Stage. Comethazine and Masicka were replaced by DJ Grevious and M Huncho. King Princess was due to perform on the NME Stage, but had to pull out due to illness. Aitch was moved from the Radio 1Xtra tent, and took their slot. Drenge performed a secret slot on the BBC Introducing stage, Enter Shikari performed a secret acoustic slot on the same stage. This was the band's third set through the festival.

Juice Wrld was scheduled to perform at Reading on the Friday of the festival but a minute before his scheduled appearance, the crew announced that he had been cancelled due to "flight issues".

Blade Brown wasn't able to perform at Reading due to being stuck in traffic.

== 2020 ==
The 2020 Festival was cancelled for health concerns due to the COVID-19 pandemic. The announced line-up was due to be:

=== Main stage ===
Reading Friday	Reading Saturday	Reading Sunday
Leeds Saturday	Leeds Sunday	Leeds Friday
Stormzy; Migos; Lewis Capaldi; All Time Low; Mabel; MoStack; As It Is; Belako	Liam Gallagher; Gerry Cinnamon; Two Door Cinema Club; D-Block Europe; Aitch; The Maine; Bloxx	Rage Against the Machine; Courteeners; Run The Jewels; Slowthai; Tom Grennan; Lady Leshurr; The Subways

=== Radio 1 stage ===
Reading Friday	Reading Saturday	Reading Sunday
Leeds Saturday	Leeds Sunday	Leeds Friday
Sam Fender; Dermot Kennedy; Mahalia; Declan McKenna; Jay1; Wallows; Joy Crookes	Rex Orange County; Headie One; Fontaines D.C.; Sea Girls; Blackbear; Easy Life; Inhaler	AJ Tracey; IDLES; The Hunna; Waterparks; Georgia; Vulpynes

=== Radio 1 Dance stage ===
Reading Friday	Reading Saturday	Reading Sunday
Leeds Saturday	Leeds Sunday	Leeds Friday
MK; Hybrid Minds; Gryffin; Koven; L Devine	Solardo; Sonny Fodera; Hannah Wants	Wilkinson Live; Jauz; Delta Heavy Presents 'Beyond'; Dom Dolla; Sofi Tukker

=== The Pit/The Lock Up ===
Reading Friday	Reading Saturday	Reading Sunday
Leeds Saturday	Leeds Sunday	Leeds Friday
Sleeping with Sirens; Bladee; Holding Absence; Ashnikko; Dune Rats	Gallows; The Bronx; Cancer Bats; Cleopatrick; Narrow Head; Nascar Aloe	Fever 333; Creeper; Ho99o9; Black Peaks; Arrested Youth; Garzi

=== Festival Republic stage ===
Reading Friday	Reading Saturday	Reading Sunday
Leeds Saturday	Leeds Sunday	Leeds Friday
JPEGMafia; Fickle Friends; 100 gecs; Spector; Lyra	Girl in Red; 070 Shake; Beabadoobee; The Hara	Sports Team; Jaws; Mae Muller; ONR.

=== Radio 1Xtra stage ===
Reading Friday	Reading Saturday	Reading Sunday
Leeds Saturday	Leeds Sunday	Leeds Friday
Denzel Curry; SL; OFB; Santi; Iann Dior; Trevor Daniel; Shaybo; Ms. Banks	Danny Brown; Young T & Bugsey; Ghetts; KSI; Br3nya	M Huncho; DigDat; Tiffany Calver; PA Salieu

== 2022 ==
The 2022 Festival was held on 26–28 August 2022.

=== Main Stage East ===
Reading Friday	Reading Saturday	Reading Sunday
Leeds Saturday	Leeds Sunday	Leeds Friday
Dave; Polo G; Little Simz; Circa Waves; Griff; Black Honey; Frank Carter and the Rattlesnakes	Arctic Monkeys; Wolf Alice; Fontaines D.C.; AJ Tracey (replaced Jack Harlow); The Lathums; Dayglow	The 1975 (replaced Rage Against the Machine); Charli XCX (replaced Måneskin); Run the Jewels; Pale Waves; Denzel Curry; Willow; Mallrat

=== Main Stage West ===
Reading Friday	Reading Saturday	Reading Sunday
Leeds Saturday	Leeds Sunday	Leeds Friday
Megan Thee Stallion; Glass Animals; All Time Low; Joy Crookes; Wallows; bbno$	Bring Me the Horizon; D-Block Europe; Enter Shikari; Poppy; De'Wayne; The Sherlocks	Halsey; Bastille; DMA's; Bad Boy Chiller Crew; Bru-C; The K's

=== BBC Radio 1 Dance stage ===
Reading Friday	Reading Saturday	Reading Sunday
Leeds Saturday	Leeds Sunday	Leeds Friday
Gorgon City; Biscits; Jaguar; Meg Ward; Nia Archives; PinkPantheress; Bakar; Everyone You Know; Piri & Tommy; Joey Valence & Brae	Wilkinson; Sigma; Pendulum (Live); A.M.C. ft Phantom; Obskur; Tommy Farrow; Luude; AMA; Madison Beer; Tai Verdes; Gus Dapperton; Police Car Collective	Hybrid Minds; Bou; Kanine; TS7 (Live); The Stickmen Project; Ashnikko; 100 gecs; Gayle; Dylan; Sad Night Dynamite

=== The Pit / Festival Republic Stage ===
Reading Friday	Reading Saturday	Reading Sunday
Leeds Saturday	Leeds Sunday	Leeds Friday
Fever 333; As It Is; Cleopatrick; Tigress; Sick Joy; Tigercub; Kid Kapichi; Scene Queen; Witch Fever; The Scratch; Beauty School Dropout	Ho99o9; Carolesdaughter; Cassyette; Sueco; Kid Brunswick; Taipei Houston; The Skinner Brothers; Static Dress; THUMPER	Role Model; STONE; Chloe Moriondo; The Blinders; Beabadoobee; The Blinders; Crawlers; Courting; The Native; Abby Roberts; Brooke Combe; CVC

=== BBC Radio 1Xtra stage ===
Reading Friday	Reading Saturday	Reading Sunday
Leeds Saturday	Leeds Sunday	Leeds Friday
Pa Salieu; Potter Payper; Knucks; Morrisson; Fumez the Engineer; Hazey; Jords; Sir Spyro; Queen Millz; Kasst x AJFrmThe8	Krept and Konan; Unknown T; JPEGMafia; Country Dons; Switchort; DJ Target; Ty Leone; Ojerime; French the Kid; Crystal Millz; JBEE; Nukuluk	ArrDee; Danny Brown; A1 x J1; Comfy; M'Way; V.I.C.; Mugun; Wes Nelson; Mnelia; Joe Unknown

== 2023 ==
The 2023 Festival was held on 25–27 August 2023.

=== Main Stage East ===
Reading Friday	Reading Saturday	Reading Sunday
Leeds Saturday	Leeds Sunday	Leeds Friday
Sam Fender; Loyle Carner; Wet Leg; Mimi Webb; Tion Wayne; Yard Act	The Killers; Central Cee; Nothing but Thieves; Inhaler; Holly Humberstone; Baby Queen; James Marriott	Billie Eilish; Steve Lacy; Declan McKenna; Rina Sawayama; Bakar; MUNA; The Amazons

=== Main Stage West ===
Reading Friday	Reading Saturday	Reading Sunday
Leeds Saturday	Leeds Sunday	Leeds Friday
Foals; Bicep Live; Trippie Redd; You Me at Six; Sea Girls; Frank Turner & The Sleeping Souls	The 1975; Knucks; Chase Atlantic; Easy Life; Arlo Parks; Jamie Webster	Imagine Dragons; Becky Hill; Lil Tjay; Don Broco; The Snuts; Hot Milk

=== Radio 1 Dance Stage ===
Reading Friday	Reading Saturday	Reading Sunday
Leeds Saturday	Leeds Sunday	Leeds Friday
Sub Focus; Dimension; Hedex; Venbee; Luude; Koven; Solueta; Gryffin; Nessa Barrett; Mother Mother; The Murder Capital; Noisy; Khazali	MK; LF System; Sammy Virji; Girls Don't Sync; Jaguar; Tibasko; Georgia; Caity Baser; Franky Wah; Hrvy; Nieve Ella; Somebody's Child	Andy C; Flava D; Friction; Metrik; Charlie Tee; Harriet Jaxxon; Taylah Elaine; Justin Milla; Eliza Rose; Fousheé; Joesef; Wallice

=== The Festival Republic Stage ===
Reading Friday	Reading Saturday	Reading Sunday
Leeds Saturday	Leeds Sunday	Leeds Friday
Palaye Royale; Yonaka; Normandie; Knocked Loose; Magnolia Park; Pinkshift; Games We Play; Jesse Jo Stark; The Last Dinner Party; Himalayas; Lauran Hibberd; Bilk	Yung Lean; Sleep Token; KennyHoopla; Soft Play; Joey Valence & Brae; Hot Milk; Zand; Scowl; High Vis; Ekkstacy; Graphic Nature; Fat Dog; Anchor Lane	Lovejoy; TV Girl; Vistas; COIN; Tom Odell; Paris Texas; Giant Rooks; Dylan John Thomas; Ethel Cain; The Royston Club; Upsahl; Artemas; Royels; English Teacher

=== Radio 1Xtra Stage ===
Reading Friday	Reading Saturday	Reading Sunday
Leeds Saturday	Leeds Sunday	Leeds Friday
Meekz; Sainte; Double D; DJ Target; Skaivater; Finn Foxell; ShaSimone; Kilo Jhené; High Fly; B3	Clavish; Cordae; Ken Carson; Nippa; Midwxst; Jbee; Kenny Allstar; SwitchOTR; Mro; P-Rallel; Mnelia; M-Huncho	K-Trap; Lacey Kar; Songer; Dreya Mac; Lost Girl; J-Fado; Aman; Nemzzz; Lil Macks

=== BBC Introducing Stage ===
Reading Friday	Reading Saturday	Reading Sunday
Leeds Saturday	Leeds Sunday	Leeds Friday
Alt Blk Era; Antony Szmira; RoseMode; Charlotte Plank; Frankie Beetlestone; Charlie Moss; Cole Blue	Claush; Santae; Double D; DJ Target; Skaivater; Finn Foxell; ShaSimone; Kilo Jhené; High Fly; B3	Claush; Santae; Double D; DJ Target; Skaivater; Finn Foxell; ShaSimone; Kilo Jhené; High Fly; B3

=== The Alternative Stage ===
Reading Friday	Reading Saturday	Reading Sunday
Leeds Saturday	Leeds Sunday	Leeds Friday
Joel Dommett; Russell Kane; Chris Washington; Daliso Chaponda; Fern Brady; Twayna Mayne; Transgressive Late Night Takeover	Hotwax; Only the Poets; The Rills; The Best Boys; The Goa Express; Himalayas; Chappell Roan; Prelay Mae; Bench Press	Joel Dommett; Russell Kane; Chris Washington; Daliso Chaponda; Fern Brady; Twayna Mayne; Transgressive Late Night Takeover

== 2024 ==
The 2024 Festival was held between 22–25 August 2024.

=== Main Stage ===
Reading Friday	Reading Saturday	Reading Sunday
Leeds Saturday	Leeds Sunday	Leeds Friday
Blink-182; Gerry Cinnamon; Two Door Cinema Club; Spiritbox; Neck Deep; The K's; Kneecap; Seb Lowe; Dasha	Fred Again; Lana Del Rey; Raye; Fontaines D.C.; Bleachers; The Last Dinner Party; Dead Poet Society; Courting; Zino Vinci	Liam Gallagher; Catfish and the Bottlemen; 21 Savage; Pendulum; Reneé Rapp; Bru-C; Crawlers; Corella; The Luka State

=== Chevron Stage ===
Reading Friday	Reading Saturday	Reading Sunday
Leeds Saturday	Leeds Sunday	Leeds Friday
The Prodigy; Bou; Denzel Curry; Kenya Grace; Sota; Killowen; Simone; LeoStayTrill	Sonny Fodera; Barry Can't Swim; Digga D; Goddard; 4am Kru; A Little Sound; DJ Jackum; Efan	Skrillex; Nia Archives; Dom Dolla; Kenny Beats; Danny Howard; Jaguar; Mette

== 2025 ==
The 2025 Festival was held between 21–24 August 2025.

=== Main Stage ===
Reading Friday	Reading Saturday	Reading Sunday
Leeds Saturday	Leeds Sunday	Leeds Friday
Hozier; Chappell Roan; The Kooks; Wallows; Bloc Party; The Royston Club; Alessi Rose; Red Rum Club	Bring Me the Horizon; Limp Bizkit; Enter Shikari; Conan Gray; Royel Otis; Good Neighbours; South Arcade; Lambrini Girls; VOILÀ	Travis Scott; D-Block Europe; Trippie Redd; Amyl and the Sniffers; Suki Waterhouse; Sea Girls; Waterparks; Songer; Demae

=== Chevron Stage ===
Reading Friday	Reading Saturday	Reading Sunday
Leeds Saturday	Leeds Sunday	Leeds Friday
AJ Tracey; Rudimental; Soft Play; Still Woozy; Nemzzz; Badger; Charlotte Plank; Good Wealth Good Health	Becky Hill; Jazzy; Wunderhorse; Bakar; Pale Waves; Example; Pozer; Issey Cross; Blanco; James and the Cold Gun	Sammy Virji; DJ EZ; Lancey Foux; Girls Don't Sync; Leigh-Anne Pinnock; Del Water Gap; Late Night Drive Home; Lyvia

== 2026 ==
The 2026 Festival was held between 27–30 August 2026.

=== The Grid ===
	Reading Sunday	Reading Friday	Reading Saturday
Leeds Thursday	Leeds Friday	Leeds Saturday	Leeds Sunday
Kasabian; The Lathums; Arkayla	Chase & Status Live; Florence + The Machine; Loyle Carner (Reading only); Role Model; Blossoms (Leeds only); Lola Young (Reading only); Arthur Hill; Dylan John Thomas (Leeds only); 54 Ultra	Charli XCX; Fontaines D.C.; Skepta; Declan McKenna; James Marriott; Keo; Beth McCarthy	Dave; Raye; Sombr; Jade; Maisie Peters; Slayyyter; Absolutely

=== The Gallery ===
Reading Sunday	Reading Friday	Reading Saturday
Leeds Friday	Leeds Saturday	Leeds Sunday
Kneecap; Men I Trust (Reading only); Kettama; The K's (Leeds only); Chris Stussy (Reading); Duke Dumont (Leeds); Holly Humberstone; Julia Wolf; After; Mulaa Joans	Geese; Skye Newman; Josh Baker (Reading); 4am Kru (Leeds only); SINN6R; Adéla; Rose Gray (Leeds only); JD Cliffe; DJ EJ	Gunna (Reading only); Viagra Boys (Reading only); Josh Baker (Leeds); Kingfishr; Nine Vicious; Duke Dumont (Reading); Jamie Webster (Leeds only); Clara La San; Niko B (Leeds); Say Now; Ceebo (Reading only); M60 (Leeds only)

=== The Warehouse ===
Reading Sunday	Reading Friday	Reading Saturday
Leeds Friday	Leeds Saturday	Leeds Sunday
Hybrid Minds; Hedex; Bou (Reading only); Sota; Notion; Hamdi; [Ivy] (Leeds only); Saint Ludo	Skepta b2b Prospa (Reading only); Skepta b2b East End Dubs (Leeds only); Alisha (Leeds only); Locky (Leeds only); Silva Bumpa (Reading); Omar+; Luuk van Dijk (Reading only); Riordan (Reading); Julian Fijma; Djammin; Meeshy	Max Dean b2b Luke Dean (Reading only); Mall Grab; Rossi.; Silva Bumpa (Leeds); Riordan (Leeds); In Parallel; Joss Dean b2b Nafe Smallz (Reading only); Tommy Phillips (Reading only); King Booo! (Reading only); Jack Marlow (Leeds only)

=== The Ballroom ===
Reading Sunday	Reading Friday	Reading Saturday
Leeds Friday	Leeds Saturday	Leeds Sunday
Paris Paloma; Bassvictim; Whatmore; Chloe Qisha (Reading only); Dexter in the Newsagent; The Clause (Leeds only); Westside Cowboy; Betty	YT; Florence Road; Overpass; Clementine Douglas; Cardinals; Bleech 9:3; Unpeople	Niko B (Reading); The Lilacs (Leeds only); Speed; Frost Children (Reading only); Bar Italia; Jane Remover (Reading only); Basht. (Leeds only); Radio Free Alice (Reading only); Garage Flower (Leeds only); Fliss (Reading only); The North (Leeds)

=== The Canopy ===
Reading Sunday	Reading Friday	Reading Saturday
Leeds Friday	Leeds Saturday	Leeds Sunday
December 10; Violet Grohl; Alex Spencer; Kilu; Untitled; Raynor; She's Green; F3miii	Villanelle; Day We Ran; People I've Met; The Guest List; Camille Blackman; The North (Reading); Florentines (Leeds only); Lamb; Tooth	Gurriers (Leeds only); Finnessekid; Seb Lowe (Reading only); Cruz Beckham and the Breakers; Kibo; Ruby Roberts; Amma; Pozzy; Sade Olutola; Fiona-Lee (Reading only)
