= ShaSimone =

British-Ghanaian singer

Shauna-Simone Yeboah, professionally known as ShaSimone is a British-Ghanaian singer-rapper.

== Discography ==
=== Singles and EPs ===
- 2020: Belly (single)
- 2021: Supersize (single)
- 2021: No Chaser (single)
- 2021: Back To Sender (single)
- 2021: Hushpuppi (single)

=== As featured artist ===
- 2021: Both Sides of a Smile (track from Dave's We're All Alone in This Together album)
- 2021: Again (Remix)
