= Llama Farmers =

English rock band

Llama Farmers were an English rock band formed in Greenwich, England in 1997.

The band's line-up consisted of singer/guitarist Bernie Simpson, guitarist William Briggs, bassist Jennie Simpson and drummer Brooke Rogers. They released their first singles through the Fierce Panda label and their albums – Dead Letter Chorus in 1999 (with the singles 'Get The Keys And Go', 'Jessica' and 'Always Echoes' and El Toppo (with the singles 'Snow White' and 'Same Song') in 2001 – through Beggars Banquet Records. Their musical style has been described as a mix of Britpop and grunge.

Llama Farmers played the NME Premier Tour in 1999, and opened for Green Day and Foo Fighters. In 1998, they appeared at the Reading Festival.
