= Disco Pistol =

English pop punk band

Disco Pistol were an English pop punk band active in the late 1990s. The band was formed in 1996 and consisted of lead vocalist, Mira Manga, lead guitarist Kevin Baxter, keyboard player Hyper Helen, bass player Craig Page and Marky Sparky on drums. The band were gathered together by 'Glitter Scene' svengalis Kevin Wilde and Hifi, who ran the influential Club Skinny at the Camden Lock HQ. It was at this club that Manga was spotted and others replied to ads in the NME.

The band were invited to add their track "Supersexy Revolutionary" to the And The Rest Is History compilation of 'C96' bands (alongside Kenickie, Helen Love, Symposium, Midget, Period Pains, etc.). The track was also released on Xerox Records as a b-side to first single "Saturday Everyday". The follow-up, double A-side single "Say Something" / "Solid Gold Radio" was released by ORG Records.

The band became notorious as the leaders of the 'Glitter Scene' - arriving onstage adorned in tiaras, fairy wings and swathes of glitter. The band made appearances at Reading Festival twice, in 1997 and 1998.

The band would go on to sign to Mercury Records where they were renamed and rebranded as pop group Sweet 3. Their debut (and only) single "Love Thang", written by Con Fitzpatrick sank was not a success. The group then split up.

Mira Manga went on to perform in bands Rolemodels, The Duloks and was very briefly a backing singer for the reformed Menswear in 2013.
