= The Jack Rubies =

British post-punk band

- Origin: London, England
- Genres: Post-punk; Indie rock; C86
- Years active: Late 1980s–early 1990s; 2020s–present
- Labels: TVT Records, Big Stir Records

The Jack Rubies are an English post-punk and indie rock band formed in London in the late 1980s. Initially active during the C86-era alternative scene, the band released a series of singles and two albums before disbanding in the early 1990s. After a hiatus of more than three decades, the original lineup reunited in the 2020s and released new material to renewed critical attention.

== History ==
=== Formation and early career ===
The Jack Rubies formed in East London in the late 1980s. The band consisted of Ian Wright (vocals, guitar), SD Ineson (guitar, backing vocals), Steve Brockway (bass), Lawrence Giltnane (percussion), and Peter Maxted (drums). Their sound combined post-punk tension with melodic indie rock and jangle pop influences, gaining attention within alternative music circles in the UK and the United States.

The band signed with the American independent label TVT Records, which released the compilation album Fascinatin’ Vacation in 1988, collecting the group’s early British singles for the U.S. market. This was followed by the studio album See the Money in My Smile in 1990.

=== Hiatus ===
Following the release of See the Money in My Smile, shifts in the music industry and the rise of new alternative movements contributed to the band’s disbandment in the early 1990s. The members pursued separate creative paths, and the band remained inactive for several decades.

=== Reunion and renewed activity ===
In the early 2020s, Ian Wright and Peter Maxted began revisiting the band’s catalog with the aim of reissuing archival material digitally. According to interviews, this process evolved into new collaborative writing and recording, leading to a full reunion of the original lineup.

In 2024, the band released Clocks Are Out of Time, their first new album in more than thirty years, through Big Stir Records. The album was noted by critics for preserving the band’s original sound while incorporating a contemporary perspective.

The follow-up album, Visions in the Bowling Alley, was released in January 2026 and received positive reviews for its energy, songwriting, and cohesion.

== Musical style ==
The Jack Rubies’ music has been described as a blend of post-punk and indie rock, characterized by melodic guitar lines, understated vocals, and a noir-tinged atmosphere. Reviewers have noted the band’s ability to balance tension and accessibility, both in their early recordings and their later work.

== Discography ==
=== Studio albums ===
- Fascinatin’ Vacation (1988) – compilation of early British singles.
- See the Money in My Smile (1990).
- Clocks Are Out of Time (2024).
- Visions in the Bowling Alley (2026).

=== Notable singles ===
- “Poltergeist” (2023) – lead single from the band’s contemporary era.
