= List of UK Country Albums Chart number ones of 2026 =

These are the Official Charts Company's UK Country Albums Chart number ones of 2026. The chart week runs from Friday to Thursday with the chart-date given as the following Thursday. Chart positions are based the multi-metric consumption of country music in the United Kingdom, blending traditional album sales, track equivalent albums, and streaming equivalent albums. The chart contains 20 positions.

In the iteration of the chart dated 2 January, the self-titled fourth studio album by Zach Bryan remained at number one for a fifth consecutive week, having spent the entirety of December 2024 at the top of the charts. It was displaced by the re-recording of Taylor Swift's Fearless for its 54th week at the chart peak, and its first week at number one since the chart dated 10 January 2025. Chris Stapleton's 2015 debut album Traveller then spent a tenth non-consecutive week at the top spot. Bryan then returned to number one, this time with his sixth album With Heaven on Top, before Stapleton reclaimed the peak for an additional three weeks. British artist Kezia Gill achieved her first number one on the iteration of the chart dated 20 February with her major label debut, All On Red. Megan Moroney earned her first UK number one with Cloud 9, which spent two weeks at the top spot before Stapleton returned for a fifth week of 2026 and a fifteenth week at number one overall. In the week following his performance at the C2C: Country to Country festival, Drake Milligan's second studio album Tumbleweed climbed to number one. Luke Combs then spent three weeks at the top with his fifth consecutive number one album, The Way I Am, followed by a trio of female solo artists: Ella Langley's Dandelion spent three weeks at number one, followed by two week chart-topper Middle of Nowhere, the fifth consecutive number one for Kacey Musgraves, and then Ashley McBryde's Wild, before Dandelion reclaimed the chart peak for an additional week. Grey by Kiefer Sutherland spent two weeks at the top before Dandelion returned for another three weeks. The Shires earned their sixth consecutive number one album with Bonfire.

== Chart history ==
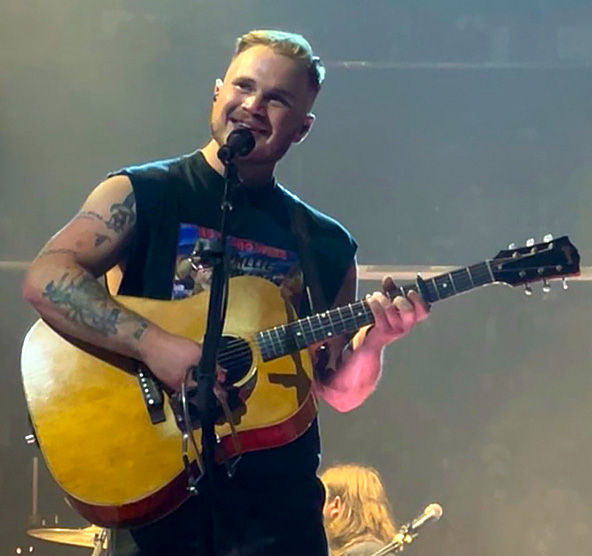
Zach Bryan earned two number one albums: Zach Bryan (2023), and With Heaven on Top (2026).

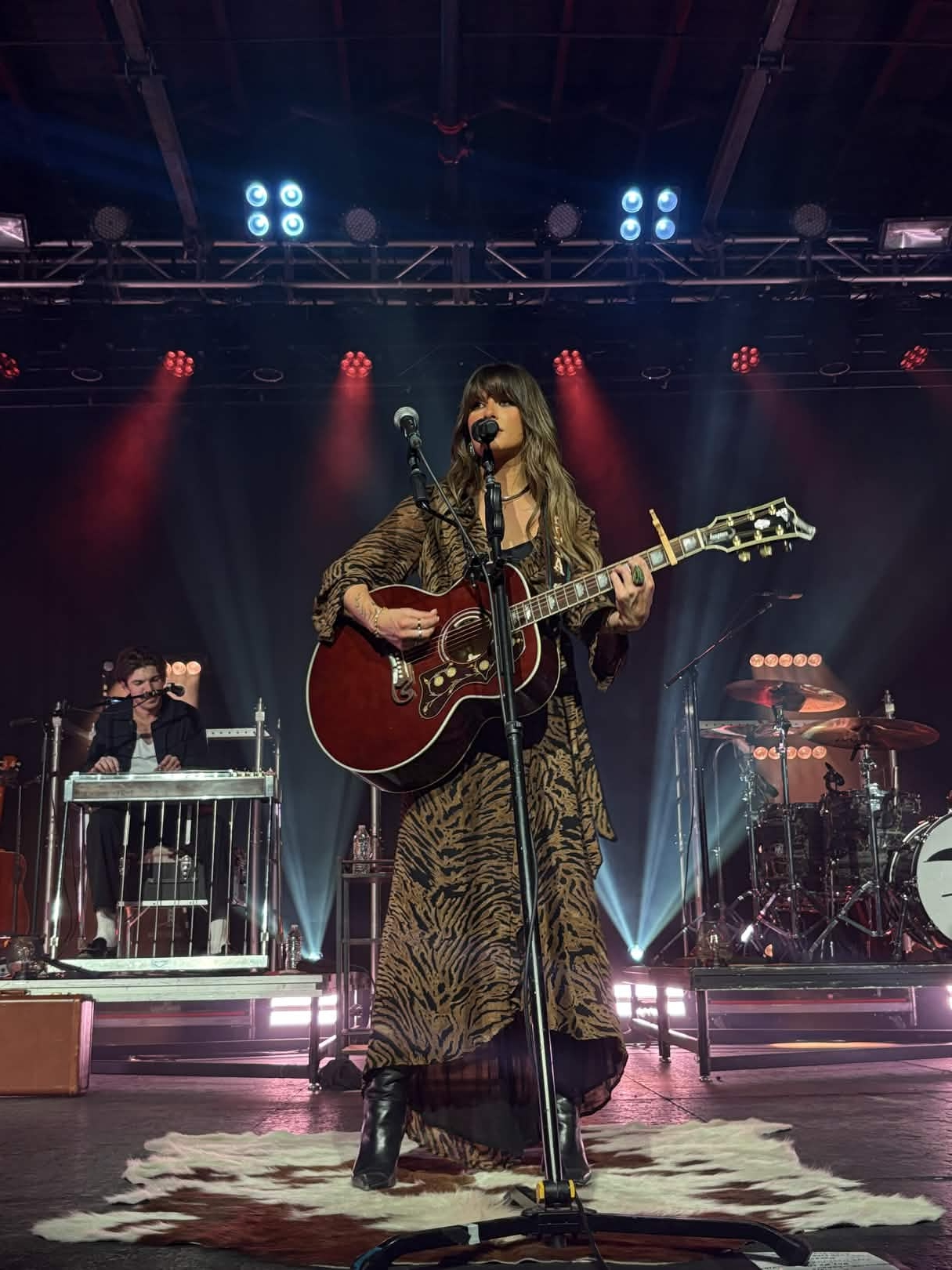
Ella Langley earned her first UK number one and spent eleven weeks at the top spot with Dandelion. Her debut album Hungover (2024) also reached the top spot for the first time.

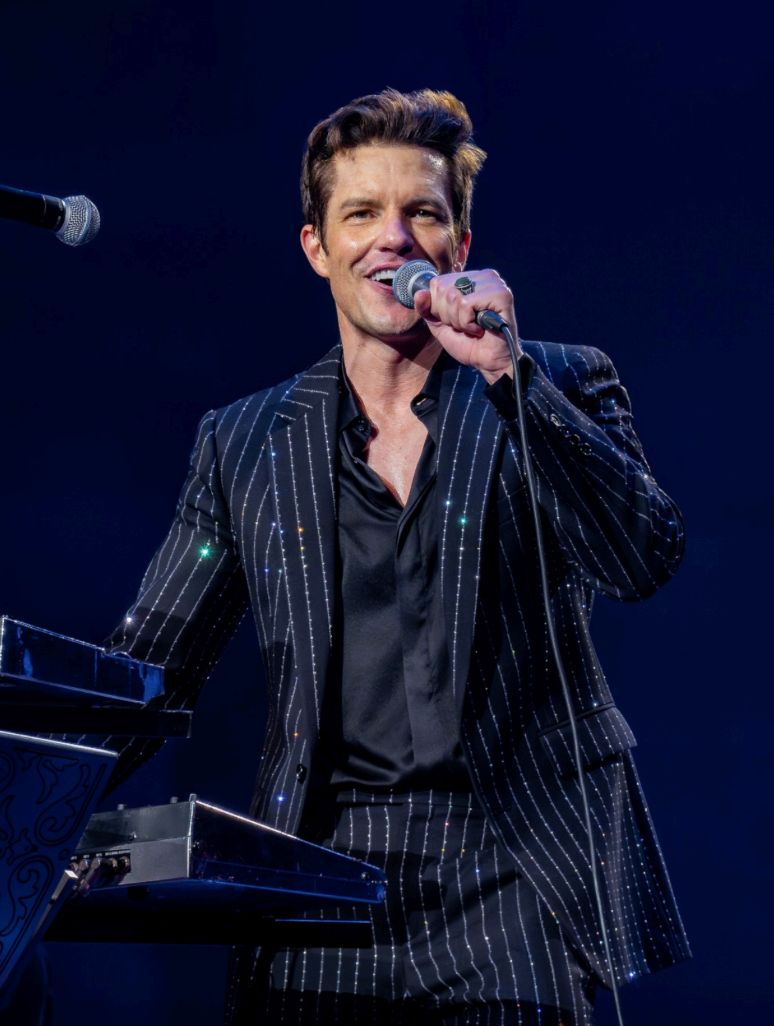
Brandon Flowers spent four consecutive weeks at the top spot with Thrasher, his third solo record.

Issue date	Album	Artist(s)	Record label	Ref.
2 January	Zach Bryan	Zach Bryan	Warner Records	
9 January	Fearless (Taylor's Version)	Taylor Swift	EMI	
16 January	Traveller	Chris Stapleton	Mercury Nashville	
23 January	With Heaven on Top	Zach Bryan	Warner Records	
30 January	Traveller	Chris Stapleton	Mercury Nashville	
6 February	Traveller	Chris Stapleton	Mercury Nashville	
13 February	Traveller	Chris Stapleton	Mercury Nashville	
20 February	All On Red	Kezia Gill	Snakefarm	
27 February	Cloud 9	Megan Moroney	Columbia Nashville	
6 March	Cloud 9	Megan Moroney	Columbia Nashville	
13 March	Traveller	Chris Stapleton	Mercury Nashville	
20 March	Tumbleweed	Drake Milligan	BBR Music Group	
27 March	The Way I Am	Luke Combs	Columbia Nashville	
3 April	The Way I Am	Luke Combs	Columbia Nashville	
10 April	The Way I Am	Luke Combs	Columbia Nashville	
17 April	Dandelion	Ella Langley	Columbia Records	
24 April	Dandelion	Ella Langley	Columbia Records	
1 May	Dandelion	Ella Langley	Columbia Records	
8 May	Middle of Nowhere	Kacey Musgraves	Lost Highway Records	
15 May	Middle of Nowhere	Kacey Musgraves	Lost Highway Records	
22 May	Wild	Ashley McBryde	Warner Records	
29 May	Dandelion	Ella Langley	Columbia Records	
5 June	Grey	Kiefer Sutherland	Maple Creek Records	
12 June	Grey	Kiefer Sutherland	Maple Creek Records	
19 June	Dandelion	Ella Langley	Columbia Records	
26 June	Dandelion	Ella Langley	Columbia Records	
3 July	Dandelion	Ella Langley	Columbia Records	
10 July	Bonfire	The Shires	Big Machine Records	
17 July	Bonfire	The Shires	Big Machine Records	
24 July	Dandelion	Ella Langley	Columbia Records	
31 July	Little Miss Twain	Shania Twain	EMI Records	
7 August	Little Miss Twain	Shania Twain	EMI Records	
14 August	Dandelion	Ella Langley	Columbia Records	
21 August	Dandelion	Ella Langley	Columbia Records	
28 August	Thrasher	Brandon Flowers	EMI Records	
4 September	Thrasher	Brandon Flowers	EMI Records	
11 September	Thrasher	Brandon Flowers	EMI Records	
18 September	Thrasher	Brandon Flowers	EMI Records	
25 September	Mule	Orville Peck	Warner Records	
2 October	Dandelion	Ella Langley	Columbia Records	
9 October	Crisco	Miranda Lambert	Republic Records	
16 October	Hungover	Ella Langley	Columbia Records	
23 October	Hungover	Ella Langley	Columbia Records	
30 October	Doin' Alright	Nathan Carter	Sharpe Music	
6 November	Dandelion	Ella Langley	Columbia Records	
13 November	Dandelion	Ella Langley	Columbia Records	
20 November	Dandelion	Ella Langley	Columbia Records	

== Most weeks at number one ==
Weeks at number one	Artist
16	Ella Langley
5	Chris Stapleton
4	Brandon Flowers
3	Luke Combs
2	Kacey Musgraves
2	Kiefer Sutherland
2	Megan Moroney
2	Shania Twain
2	The Shires
2	Zach Bryan

== See also ==
- List of UK Albums Chart number ones of 2026
- List of UK Dance Singles Chart number ones of 2026
- List of UK Album Downloads Chart number ones of 2026
- List of UK Independent Albums Chart number ones of 2026
- List of UK R&B Albums Chart number ones of 2026
- List of UK Rock & Metal Albums Chart number ones of 2026
- List of UK Compilation Chart number ones of the 2020s
