= List of UK Independent Singles Chart number ones of 2026 =

These are the Official Charts Company's UK Independent Singles Chart number-one singles of 2026.

== Chart history ==
Chart date (week ending)	Song	Artist(s)	Record label	References
1 January	"Merry Xmas Everybody"	Slade	BMG	
8 January ^{[a]}	"Where Is My Husband!"	Raye	Human Re Sources	
15 January ^{[a]}	"End of Beginning"	Djo	Djo	
22 January ^{[a]}	"End of Beginning"	Djo	Djo	
29 January	"End of Beginning"	Djo	Djo	
5 February	"End of Beginning"	Djo	Djo	
12 February	"Where Is My Husband!"	Raye	Human Re Sources	
19 February	"Where Is My Husband!"	Raye	Human Re Sources	
26 February	"Where Is My Husband!"	Raye	Human Re Sources	
5 March	"Where Is My Husband!"	Raye	Human Re Sources	
12 March	"Where Is My Husband!"	Raye	Human Re Sources	
19 March	"Where Is My Husband!"	Raye	Human Re Sources	
26 March	"Where Is My Husband!"	Raye	Human Re Sources	
2 April	"Where Is My Husband!"	Raye	Human Re Sources	
9 April ^{[b]}	"Where Is My Husband!"	Raye	Human Re Sources	
16 April	"Where Is My Husband!"	Raye	Human Re Sources	
23 April	"Where Is My Husband!"	Raye	Human Re Sources	
30 April	"Where Is My Husband!"	Raye	Human Re Sources	
7 May	"Where Is My Husband!"	Raye	Human Re Sources	
14 May	"Where Is My Husband!"	Raye	Human Re Sources	
21 May	"Where Is My Husband!"	Raye	Human Re Sources	
28 May	"Where Is My Husband!"	Raye	Human Re Sources	
4 June	"Where Is My Husband!"	Raye	Human Re Sources	
11 June	"Where Is My Husband!"	Raye	Human Re Sources	
18 June	"Where Is My Husband!"	Raye	Human Re Sources	
25 June	"Where Is My Husband!"	Raye	Human Re Sources	
2 July	"Where Is My Husband!"	Raye	Human Re Sources	
9 July	"Free Your Mind"	Prospa and Cloonee	Circoloco	
16 July	"Free Your Mind"	Prospa and Cloonee	Circoloco	
23 July	"Talk To You"	Anotr featuring 54 Ultra	No art	
30 July	"Talk To You"	Anotr featuring 54 Ultra	No art	
6 August	"Talk To You"	Anotr featuring 54 Ultra	No art	
13 August	"Movin' to the Sun"	Hugel, Imael Angel and Ultra Naté	Make the Girls Dance	
20 August	"Movin' to the Sun"	Hugel, Imael Angel and Ultra Naté	Make the Girls Dance	
27 August	"Movin' to the Sun"	Hugel, Imael Angel and Ultra Naté	Make the Girls Dance	
3 September	"Movin' to the Sun"	Hugel, Imael Angel and Ultra Naté	Make the Girls Dance	
10 September	"Movin' to the Sun"	Hugel, Imael Angel and Ultra Naté	Make the Girls Dance	
17 September	"Movin' to the Sun"	Hugel, Imael Angel and Ultra Naté	Make the Girls Dance	
24 September	"Movin' to the Sun"	Hugel, Imael Angel and Ultra Naté	Make the Girls Dance	
1 October	"Movin' to the Sun"	Hugel, Imael Angel and Ultra Naté	Make the Girls Dance	
8 October	"Movin' to the Sun"	Hugel, Imael Angel and Ultra Naté	Make the Girls Dance	
15 October	"Movin' to the Sun"	Hugel, Imael Angel and Ultra Naté	Make the Girls Dance	
22 October	"Movin' to the Sun"	Hugel, Imael Angel and Ultra Naté	Make the Girls Dance	
29 October ^{[b]}	"Marianne"	Fontaines D.C.	XL	
5 November	"Movin' to the Sun"	Hugel, Imael Angel and Ultra Naté	Make the Girls Dance	
12 November	"Movin' to the Sun"	Hugel, Imael Angel and Ultra Naté	Make the Girls Dance	
19 November	"Movin' to the Sun"	Hugel, Imael Angel and Ultra Naté	Make the Girls Dance	
26 November	"Movin' to the Sun"	Hugel, Imael Angel and Ultra Naté	Make the Girls Dance	

== Notes ==
- ^{a} – The single was simultaneously number-one on the singles chart.
- ^{b} - The artist was simultaneously number one on the Independent Albums Chart.

== Number-one Indie artists ==
Position	Artist	Weeks at number one
1	Raye	22
2	Hugel	15
2	Imael Angel	15
3	Djo	4
4	Anotr	3
4	54 Ultra	3
5	Prospa	2
5	Cloonee	2
6	Slade	1
6	Fontaines D.C.	1

== See also ==
- List of UK Dance Singles Chart number ones of 2026
- List of UK R&B Singles Chart number ones of 2026
- List of UK Rock & Metal Singles Chart number ones of 2026
- List of UK Independent Albums Chart number ones of 2026
