= List of UK Dance Singles Chart number ones of 2026 =

The UK Dance Singles Chart is a weekly music chart compiled in the United Kingdom by the Official Charts Company (OCC) from sales of songs in the dance music genre (house, drum and bass, dubstep, etc.) in record stores and digital downloads. The chart week runs from Friday to Thursday with the chart-date given as the following Thursday.

This is a list of the songs which were number one on the UK Dance Singles Chart during 2026.

== Chart history ==
Chart date (week ending)	Song	Artist(s)	References
1 January	"I Run"	Haven featuring Kaitlin Aragon	
8 January	"No Broke Boys"	Disco Lines and Tinashe	
15 January	"No Broke Boys"	Disco Lines and Tinashe	
22 January	"I Run"	Haven featuring Kaitlin Aragon	
29 January	"I Run"	Haven featuring Kaitlin Aragon	
5 February	"I Run"	Haven featuring Kaitlin Aragon	
12 February	"No Broke Boys"	Disco Lines and Tinashe	
19 February	"No Broke Boys"	Disco Lines and Tinashe	
26 February	"Just the Way You Are"	Milky	
5 March	"Just the Way You Are"	Milky	
12 March	"Just the Way You Are"	Milky	
19 March	"Just the Way You Are"	Milky	
26 March	"Just the Way You Are"	Milky	
2 April	"Just the Way You Are"	Milky	
9 April	"Just the Way You Are"	Milky	
16 April	"Just the Way You Are"	Milky	
23 April	"Just the Way You Are"	Milky	
30 April	"Just the Way You Are"	Milky	
7 May	"Just the Way You Are"	Milky	
14 May	"Just the Way You Are"	Milky	
21 May	"Go"	The Chemical Brothers	
28 May	"Go"	The Chemical Brothers	
4 June	"Go"	The Chemical Brothers	
11 June	"Go"	The Chemical Brothers	
18 June	"Go"	The Chemical Brothers	
25 June	"Go"	The Chemical Brothers	
2 July	"Free Your Mind"	Prospa and Cloonee	
9 July	"Free Your Mind"	Prospa and Cloonee	
16 July	"Free Your Mind"	Prospa and Cloonee	
23 July	"Talk to You"	Anotr featuring 54 Ultra	
30 July	"Talk to You"	Anotr featuring 54 Ultra	
6 August	"Talk to You"	Anotr featuring 54 Ultra	
13 August	"Movin' to the Sun"	Hugel, Imael Angel and Ultra Naté	
20 August	"Movin' to the Sun"	Hugel, Imael Angel and Ultra Naté	
27 August	"Movin' to the Sun"	Hugel, Imael Angel and Ultra Naté	
3 September	"Movin' to the Sun"	Hugel, Imael Angel and Ultra Naté	
10 September	"Movin' to the Sun"	Hugel, Imael Angel and Ultra Naté	
17 September	"Movin' to the Sun"	Hugel, Imael Angel and Ultra Naté	
24 September	"Movin' to the Sun"	Hugel, Imael Angel and Ultra Naté	
1 October	"Movin' to the Sun"	Hugel, Imael Angel and Ultra Naté	
8 October	"Movin' to the Sun"	Hugel, Imael Angel and Ultra Naté	
15 October	"Movin' to the Sun"	Hugel, Imael Angel and Ultra Naté	
22 October	"Movin' to the Sun"	Hugel, Imael Angel and Ultra Naté	
29 October	"Movin' to the Sun"	Hugel, Imael Angel and Ultra Naté	
5 November	"Movin' to the Sun"	Hugel, Imael Angel and Ultra Naté	
12 November	"Movin' to the Sun"	Hugel, Imael Angel and Ultra Naté	
19 November	"Movin' to the Sun"	Hugel, Imael Angel and Ultra Naté	
26 November	"Movin' to the Sun"	Hugel, Imael Angel and Ultra Naté	

- ^{a} – the single was simultaneously number-one on the singles chart.

== Number-one artists ==
Position	Artist	Weeks at number one
1	Hugel	16
1	Imael Angel	16
1	Ultra Naté	16
2	Milky	13
3	The Chemical Brothers	6
4	Haven	4
4	Kaitlin Aragon (as featuring)	4
4	Disco Lines	4
4	Tinashe	4
5	Prospa	3
5	Cloonee	3
5	Anotr	3
5	54 Ultra (as featuring)	3

== See also ==
- List of number-one singles of 2026 (UK)
- List of UK Dance Albums Chart number ones of 2026
- List of UK R&B Singles Chart number ones of 2026
- List of UK Rock & Metal Singles Chart number ones of 2026
- List of UK Independent Singles Chart number ones of 2026
