= List of UK Dance Albums Chart number ones of 2026 =

These are the Official Charts Company's UK Dance Albums Chart number ones of 2026. The chart week runs from Friday to Thursday with the chart-date given as the following Thursday.

== Chart history ==
Issue date	Album	Artist(s)	Record label	Ref.
1 January	The Annual 2026	Various Artists	Ministry of Sound	
8 January	The Annual 2026	Various Artists	Ministry of Sound	
15 January	The Annual 2026	Various Artists	Ministry of Sound	
22 January	The Annual 2026	Various Artists	Ministry of Sound	
29 January	The Annual 2026	Various Artists	Ministry of Sound	
5 February	The Annual 2026	Various Artists	Ministry of Sound	
12 February	Trouble	Totally Enormous Extinct Dinosaurs	Polydor	
19 February	Urgh	Mandy India	Sacred Bones	
26 February	Redline	K Motionz	Positiva	
5 March	Caracal	Disclosure	PMR	
12 March	Leather Temple	Carpenter Brut	No Quarter	
19 March	Enter the Sound	Dub Pistols/Freestylers	Cyclone	
26 March	Crystalpunk	Chalk	Alter Music	
2 April	The Annual 2026	Various Artists	Ministry of Sound	
9 April	Ö	Fcukers	Ninja Tune	
16 April	In a Space Outta Sound	Nightmares on Wax	Warp	
23 April	Mezzanine	Massive Attack	Virgin	
30 April	Come Closer	Tomora	Fontana	
7 May	Come Closer	Tomora	Fontana	
14 May	Sol.HZ	Seefeel	Warp	
21 May	Passed Me By	Submotion Orchestra	SMO	
28 May	Come Closer	Tomora	Fontana	
4 June	The Endless Dance	Hannah Peel and Beibei Wang	Real World	
11 June	Inferno	Boards of Canada	Warp	
18 June	Inferno	Boards of Canada	Warp	
25 June	Inferno	Boards of Canada	Warp	
2 July	More Songs About the Sun	Pye Corner Audio	Sonic Cathedral	
9 July	Inferno	Boards of Canada	Warp	
16 July	Confessions II	Madonna	Warner	
23 July	Confessions II	Madonna	Warner	
30 July	Emotional Junglist	Nia Archives	Island	
6 August	Confessions II	Madonna	Warner	
13 August	Confessions II	Madonna	Warner	
20 August	Pure Devotion	Overmono	XL	
27 August	Confessions II	Madonna	Warner	
3 September	What Are the Odds	Jorja Smith	FAMM	
10 September	Confessions II	Madonna	Warner	
17 September	Farewell Ferengistan	Banco De Gaia	Disco Gecko	
24 September	Distance in Static	Bonobo	Ninja Tune	
1 October	Distance in Static	Bonobo	Ninja Tune	
8 October	Glastonbury 1994	Orbital	London	
15 October	Northern Exposure Redux - Sasha/Digweed	Various Artists	Late Night Tales	
22 October	Generic Everything	Chase & Status	Warner	
29 October	No Bad Memories	The Avalanches	Polydor	
5 November	Peace & Patience	Jazzy	Chaos	
12 November	Industrial Growth	Warrington-Runcorn New Town	Castles In Space	
19 November	The Night's Not Dead	Tinie Tempah	Imhotep Records	
26 November	Rebecca	Becky Hill	Polydor	

== See also ==
- List of UK Albums Chart number ones of 2026
- List of UK Dance Singles Chart number ones of 2026
- List of UK Album Downloads Chart number ones of 2026
- List of UK Independent Albums Chart number ones of 2026
- List of UK R&B Albums Chart number ones of 2026
- List of UK Rock & Metal Albums Chart number ones of 2026
- List of UK Compilation Chart number ones of the 2020s
