= I Run =

2025 single by Haven

- Original version cover

Single by HAVEN.
- Released: 29 October 2025
- Genre: EDM; UK garage
- Length: 2:09
- Label: Isekai; Broke; Against All Odds
- Songwriter: Harrison Walker
- Producer: Jacob Donaghue

"I Run" is a song by HAVEN. (also typeset as HVN), made up of British producers Harrison Walker and Jacob Donaghue. It was released as their debut single on 29 October 2025 for digital download and streaming by Isekai Records, Broke Records, and Against All Odds. The electronic dance music and UK garage track was written by Walker and produced by Donaghue.

The song drew controversy after accusations of using artificial intelligence-generated vocals. It was pulled from most streaming services following concerns that the song violated copyright; nonetheless, the song achieved relative chart success, reaching the top 10 in Australia's ARIA Charts and Austria's Ö3 Austria Top 40.

A re-recorded version of the song featuring the vocals of singer Kaitlin Aragon, was released on 21 November 2025. This version peaked at number nine on the UK Singles Chart and at number 28 on the Irish Singles Chart.

Following the success of the re-recorded version, the song received a string of remixes from various prominent DJs such as David Guetta, Ely Oaks, James Hype and more starting in January 2026.

== Release and composition ==
"I Run" is the debut single by British production duo Haven. The song was released on 29 October 2025 for digital download and streaming. It was issued through a collaboration between the London-based labels Isekai Records and Against All Odds, in partnership with Broke Records and Create Music Group, following the success of the Isekai-Broke collaboration on Ndotz's "Embrace It" in 2024.

"I Run" was written by Walker and produced by Jacob Donaghue. Running two minutes and nine seconds, it is an electronic dance music and UK garage track that incorporates elements of lo-fi, trip hop, and downtempo with lyrics that evoke a sense of emotional escape.

=== Use of artificial intelligence ===
The vocals are performed by Walker, "run through layers of processing and filtering." Donaghue and Walker have confirmed that they used Suno's "AI-assisted vocal processing" to transform Walker's voice into that of a woman's, but maintain that they did not specify any artist to mimic. The prompts used included "soulful vocal samples". Despite the use of artificial intelligence vocals, Walker and Donague claim that they wrote the song and produced it in ProTools.

== Reception ==
The profile of Haven, which appeared on TikTok around the time of the song's release, drew attention due to his unknown identity and grew steadily, attracting likes and followers. "I Run" was streamed more than ten million times on Haven's social media channel in under a week. By 12 November 2025, the official sound had appeared in more than 25,000 user-generated TikTok posts.

The song proved particularly popular among young audiences and was used in various TikTok content, including choreography, reaction videos, remixes, and emotional moments. It drew attention amid a viral trend comparing the neutral, atmospheric qualities of dance-pop music commonly heard in department stores to those played in ski resorts and nightclubs.

"I Run" accumulated over 290,000 official on-demand streams in the United States during 31 October–3 November 2025, and the following week (7–10 November) its streams rose by approximately 1,106 percent, reaching more than 3.5 million.

== Copyright and platform removal ==
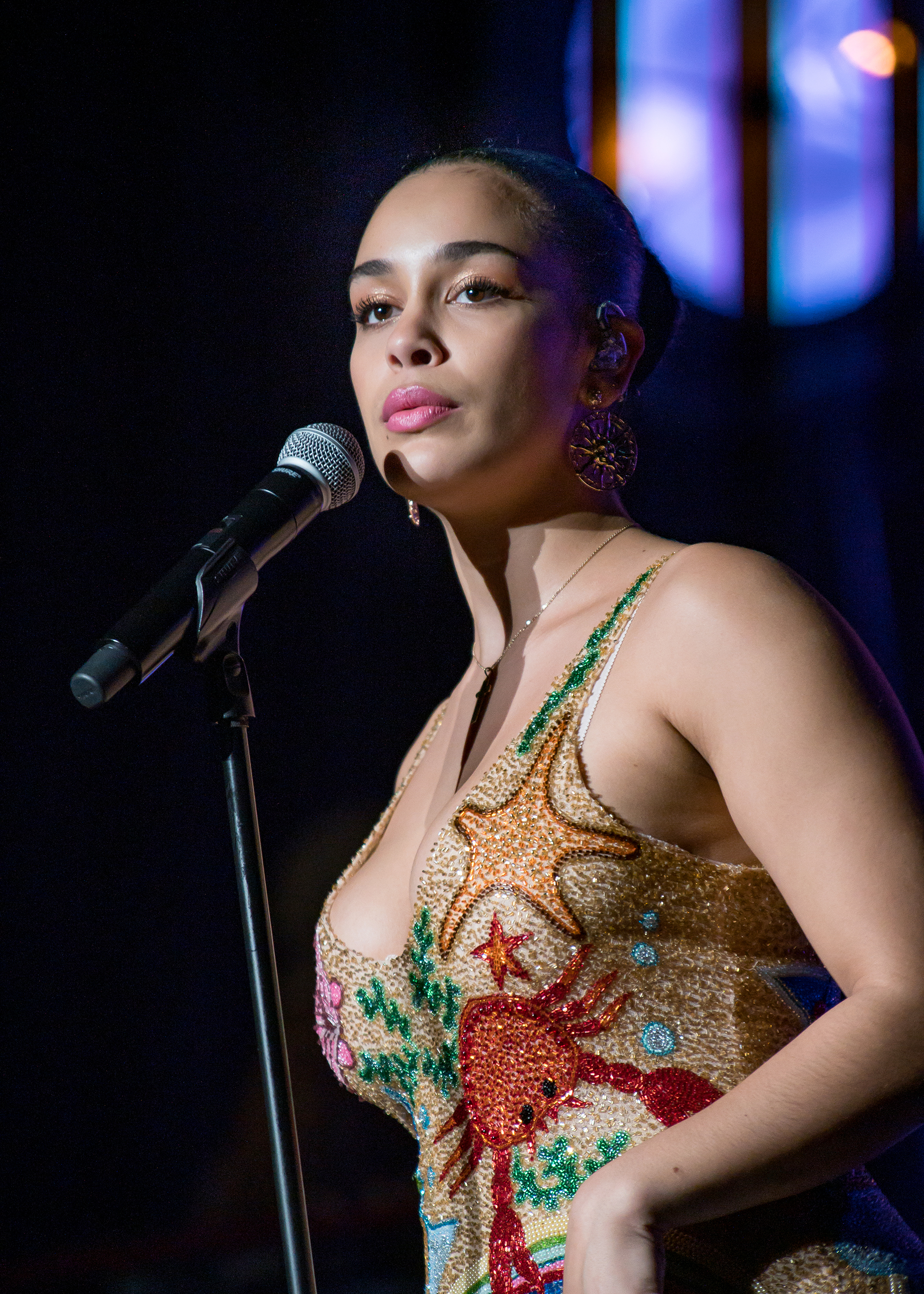
Singer Jorja Smith denied any involvement with the song, leading to speculation that an AI deepfake of her voice was used.

In October 2025, British singer Jorja Smith publicly denied claims that her vocals had been used on "I Run", which led to speculation that artificial intelligence might have been employed in the production. Walker used the hashtag "#jorjasmith" to promote the song on social media. Smith's record label The Orchard and the RIAA issued multiple takedown requests, alleging that the song "misrepresents" another artist and thus violates copyright. Walker and Donaghue later confirmed the use of artificial intelligence, though denied that the vocals were meant to imitate Smith.

As of 12 November 2025, "I Run" was unavailable on Spotify reportedly due to potential copyright issues. When contacted about the removal, Spotify stated that its platform "strictly prohibits artist impersonation". On the same day, Andre Benz, CEO of Broke Records, posted an image on Instagram reading "All my homies hate Sony" in response to the song's withdrawal from certain platforms. By 18 November, "I Run" was removed from most streaming services, including Apple Music. Due to the copyright dispute, Billboard withheld the song from appearing on its US Hot 100 chart.

In December 2025, Smith's record label FAMM began pursuing royalties and compensation for the song.

== Charts ==
=== Original version ===
==== Weekly charts ====
Weekly chart performance for "I Run"
Chart (2025−2026)	Peak position
Australia (ARIA)	8
Australia Dance (ARIA)	2
Belarus Airplay (TopHit)	41
CIS Airplay (TopHit)	16
Estonia Airplay (TopHit)	2
Germany Dance (GfK)	2
Greece International (IFPI)	12
Kazakhstan Airplay (TopHit)	8
Lithuania (AGATA)	86
Moldova Airplay (TopHit)	17
Portugal (AFP)	107
Russia Airplay (TopHit)	13
UK Singles (OCC)	56
UK Dance (OCC)	8
UK Indie (OCC)	27
US Hot Dance/Electronic Songs (Billboard)	8

==== Monthly charts ====
Monthly chart performance for "I Run"
Chart (2025–2026)	Peak position
Belarus Airplay (TopHit)	44
CIS Airplay (TopHit)	19
Estonia Airplay (TopHit)	2
Kazakhstan Airplay (TopHit)	19
Moldova Airplay (TopHit)	24
Russia Airplay (TopHit)	19

=== Kaitlin Aragon re-release ===
==== Weekly charts ====
Weekly chart performance for "I Run" featuring Kaitlin Aragon
Chart (2025–2026)	Peak position
Australia (ARIA)	9
Australia Dance (ARIA)	2
Austria (Ö3 Austria Top 40)	7
Belarus Airplay (TopHit)	34
Belgium (Ultratop 50 Flanders)	16
Belgium (Ultratop 50 Wallonia)	37
Canada (Canadian Hot 100)	41
CIS Airplay (TopHit)	40
Croatia International Airplay (Top lista)	5
Estonia Airplay (TopHit)	13
France (SNEP)	141
Germany (GfK)	17
Germany Airplay (BVMI)	10
Global 200 (Billboard)	77
Greece International (IFPI)	30
Ireland (IRMA)	28
Latvia Airplay (LaIPA)	1
Lebanon (Lebanese Top 20)	5
Lithuania (AGATA)	44
Luxembourg (Billboard)	22
Malta Airplay (Radiomonitor)	8
Moldova Airplay (TopHit)	8
Netherlands (Dutch Top 40)	14
Netherlands (Single Top 100)	14
New Zealand (Recorded Music NZ)	10
North Macedonia Airplay (Radiomonitor)	12
Norway (VG-lista)	88
Poland (Polish Airplay Top 100)	47
Romania Airplay (Media Forest)	8
Romania TV Airplay (Media Forest)	20
Russia Airplay (TopHit)	48
Serbia Airplay (Radiomonitor)	17
Slovakia Airplay (ČNS IFPI)	42
Slovakia Singles Digital (ČNS IFPI)	67
Sweden (Sverigetopplistan)	54
Switzerland (Schweizer Hitparade)	18
Turkey International Airplay (Radiomonitor Türkiye)	9
UK Singles (Official Charts)	9
UK Dance (Official Charts)	1
UK Indie (Official Charts)	3
US Bubbling Under Hot 100 (Billboard)	18
US Dance Airplay (Billboard)	1
US Hot Dance/Electronic Songs (Billboard)	4

==== Monthly charts ====
Monthly chart performance for "I Run" featuring Kaitlin Aragon
Chart (2025–2026)	Peak position
Belarus Airplay (TopHit)	37
CIS Airplay (TopHit)	48
Estonia Airplay (TopHit)	17
Latvia Airplay (TopHit)	3
Moldova Airplay (TopHit)	15
Romania Airplay (TopHit)	17
Russia Airplay (TopHit)	61

== Certifications ==
Certifications and sales for "I Run"
Region	Certification	Certified units/sales
New Zealand (RMNZ)	Platinum	30,000^{‡}
United Kingdom (BPI)	Gold	400,000^{‡}
^{‡} Sales+streaming figures based on certification alone.

== Release history ==
Release dates and formats for "I Run"
Region	Date	Format	Label	Ref.
Various	29 October 2025	Digital download; streaming	Isekai; Broke; Against All Odds	
United Kingdom	14 November 2025	Contemporary hit radio	Isekai; Broke; Against All Odds	
