= Seize the Power =

Mixtape by Yonaka
- Released: July 15, 2021
- Studio: Distillery Studio
- Genres: rock; alt rock
- Length: 25:45
- Label: Creature Records
- Producers: Alex Crosby; George Edwards; Theresa Jarvis; Rob Mason

Yonaka chronology
Don't Wait 'Til Tomorrow (2019)	Seize the Power (2021)	Welcome to My House (2023)

Singles from Seize the Power
- 1. "Ordinary"; 2. "Seize the Power"; 3. "Raise Your Glass"; 4. "Call Me a Saint"

Seize the Power is a mixtape by English rock group Yonaka released in 2021. The mixtape features Fever 333 and Barns Courtney.

== Background ==
On January 27, 2021, Yonaka released the lead single, "Seize the Power" off their Mixtape of the same name. Yonaka also released a music video for the song on the same day. The video was directed by Jade Ang Jackman and produced by Lauren Mills. In March they released "Ordinary", followed by "Call Me a Saint" in May and 'Raise Your Glass" in June. Yonaka would release the mixtape on July 15th of that year. The mixtape features tracks featuring Fever 333 and Barns Courtney.

Yonaka states that they have been working on Seize the Power, since December 2019, right after their debut album, Don't Wait 'Til Tomorrow.

== Themes and composition ==
Yonaka states "key themes [of the album] are empowerment, strength, aggression, and the sense of trusting where you are is the right place." Front woman, Theresa Jarvis, states about the lead single "You know when you feel fucking good and you're glowing and you feel like the whole world is with you? That's what 'Seize The Power' is." The song "Get Out" was inspired by the film Girl, Interrupted. Jarvis states the song was written on a "cheap Casio keyboard from the 80's that barely works." "Ordinary" is about striving for greatness, while "Greedy" is about striking people who try to take from you.

"Clique" features singer Jason Aalon Butler from the group Fever 333, who describes the song as "just a lot of swearing, basically." "Raise Your Glass" has a pop-punk style reminiscent of Paramore.

== Track listing ==
All tracks are written by Alex Crosby, George Edwards, Theresa Jarvis and Rob Mason.

No.	Title	Length
1.	"Ordinary"	4:30
2.	"Seize the Power"	2:41
3.	"Get Out"	3:31
4.	"Raise Your Glass"	3:10
5.	"Clique" (featuring Fever 333)	2:19
6.	"Greedy"	2:26
7.	"Call Me a Saint"	3:20
8.	"Anthem" (featuring Barns Courtney)	3:48
Total length:		25:45

All credits are adapted from Spotify
