= Barnacle Boi =

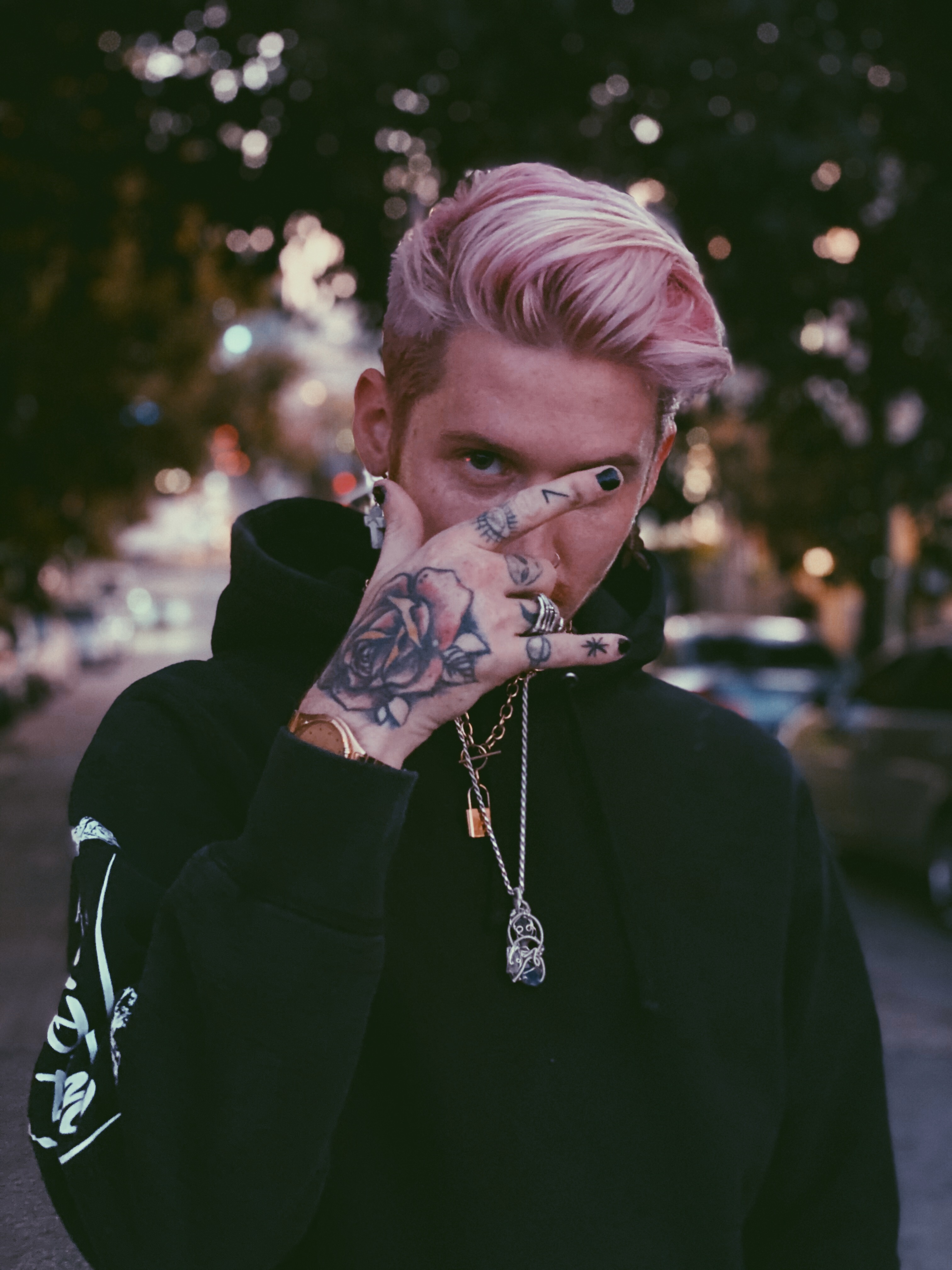
- Born: Ian Oliver; December 23, 1992 (age 33); Wilmington, North Carolina, United States
- Occupations: record producer; DJ; vocalist; visual artist
- Years active: 2015–present
- Musical career
- Genres: Trap
- Instruments: Ableton Live; piano; guitar
- Label: Bertelsmann Music Group
- Website: barnacleboi.com

Ian Oliver (born December 23, 1992) known professionally as Barnacle Boi (stylized as barnacle boi), is an American producer, DJ, vocalist, and visual artist based in the southeast coast of the United States. barnacle boi developed his production style during his few years living in Denver, Colorado and has stuck with it ever since.

== Background ==
Ian Oliver was born in Hickory, North Carolina. He first started making experimental beats in 2008 before making trap and hip-hop beats. After these types of beats became extremely repetitive to Oliver, he moved on to "dubstep and other heavier-hitting sub genres of EDM" under his "Sightlow" project. In his interview with The Playground, Barnacle Boi explains that he worked on the Sightlow project for numerous years and he always felt like he had to "force it out" of himself. Beginning in 2013, Barnacle Boi began making music on the side that came "from his heart" which "felt 100% natural to" him. The tracks made this way were eventually released under his new project "barnacle boi" which is now his main musical focus.

== Career ==
=== 2015–2017: Early career ===
On March 1, 2015, barnacle boi made his official debut with the release of his single "Memories feat. Madi Larson". This was also his first official collaborative project as barnacle boi with the vocal feature of Madi Larson. The single was self-distributed to all major streaming services such as Spotify, and Apple Music.

Barnacle Boi continued to release numerous singles as well as a "flip" of T.A.T.u.'s "All the Things She Said".

=== 2019: Release of EP 777 and full-length album 2020 ===
On February 1, 2019, barnacle boi released his debut extended play 777 to all major streaming platforms. The extended play features four songs, two of which include vocals from barnacle boi himself.

The EP had good critical reception, landing barnacle boi at the No. 5 spot on Trap Nation's Top 5 List for Diplo's Revolution Radio on Sirius XM Channel 52.

barnacle boi released his first full-length album with the 8-track 2020. The project was originally intended to be released as an EP, but over time it progressed into a full album. In a feature with the publication FUXWITHIT, barnacle boi recalled, "I’ve been working on it for about a year now, and went through a pretty rough time emotionally over the past 6 months which gave me the inspo [sic] and drive to turn it into an LP." FUXWITHIT writes that each track is "emotionally charged" and carries "thick feelings", while explaining that barnacle boi creates "a heartfelt journey " throughout the album.

== Personal life ==
Ian Oliver grew up in North Carolina but spends most of his time between the East Coast and Denver, CO. He currently resides in Denver. Oliver cites Kid Cudi, Clams Casino, Lil Peep, The Flaming Lips, Coldplay, and Arcade Fire as some of his musical influences. When asked how much music means to him, Oliver responded by saying, "Music means everything to me. It saved my life when I was 16/17 years old and I am completely committed to it until I die. It’s something I can use to relate to feelings, people, places, etc. I don’t know of anything else that gives me the feelings music does. Being able to create it makes it that much more special to me".

== Discography ==
=== Singles ===
- Memories (feat. Madi Larson) (2015)
- This Is Also A Lost Project (2017)
- Interlude. (2017)
- Up from Here. (2017)
- Anything for You. (2017)
- Lincoln St. (2017)
- All the Things She Said (Barnacle Boi Flip) (2017)
- Don't Dwell. (2018)
- Casual (2018)
- Forever. (2018)
- Wake up. (2018)
- Run Away. (2018)
- Come and Go. (2018)
- Let Go. (2018)
- Have Hope. (2018)
- Downpour. (2018)
- Overcome. (2018)
- Love U (2018)
- Still. (2019)
- Displaced (2019)
- Accusing Me (Barnacle Boi Remix) (originally recorded by Lyfe Jennings) (2019)

=== Extended plays ===
Title	Details
777	Released: February 1, 2019; Label: Self-released; Format: Streaming, digital download

=== Albums ===
Title	Details
2020	Released: October 19, 2019; Label: Self-released; Format: Streaming, digital download

== Live Shows ==
Barnacle Boi has had many notable performances such as headlining shows at The Fillmore in Charlotte, NC, the Lincoln Theatre in Raleigh, NC, and at Station1640 in Los Angeles, California. He has also opened for prominent artists such as Rich Brian, Hippie Sabotage and Hermitude

In his interview with The Playground, Barnacle Boi says, "I love high energy crowds. My live sets are much heavier than my production typically tends to be, however I will always throw originals in the mix to take the crowd on an energy “rollercoaster". There isn't a better feeling than being on stage playing music for a packed crowd"
