= Yonaka =

English rock band

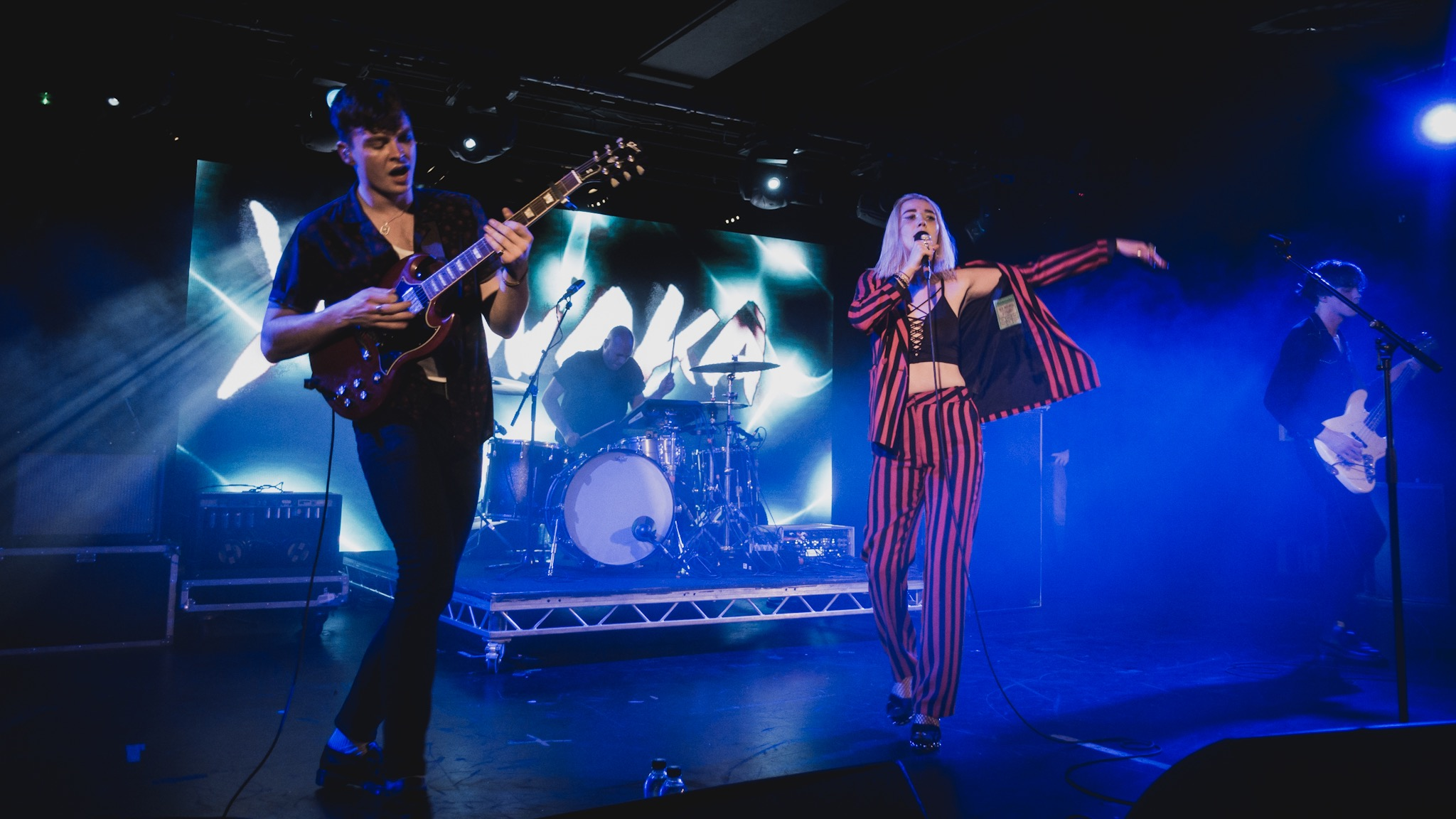
- Yonaka performing in 2018

Background information
- Origin: Brighton, East Sussex, England
- Genre: Alternative rock
- Years active: 2014–present
- Labels: Asylum; Fueled By Ramen
- Members: Theresa Jarvis; George Edwards; Alex Crosby
- Past members: Robert Mason

Yonaka (stylized in all caps) are an English rock band based in Brighton. The group consists of Theresa Jarvis on vocals, George Edwards on guitar, and Alex Crosby on bass and keyboards. Yonaka released their debut album, Don't Wait 'Til Tomorrow, on 31 May 2019.

== History ==
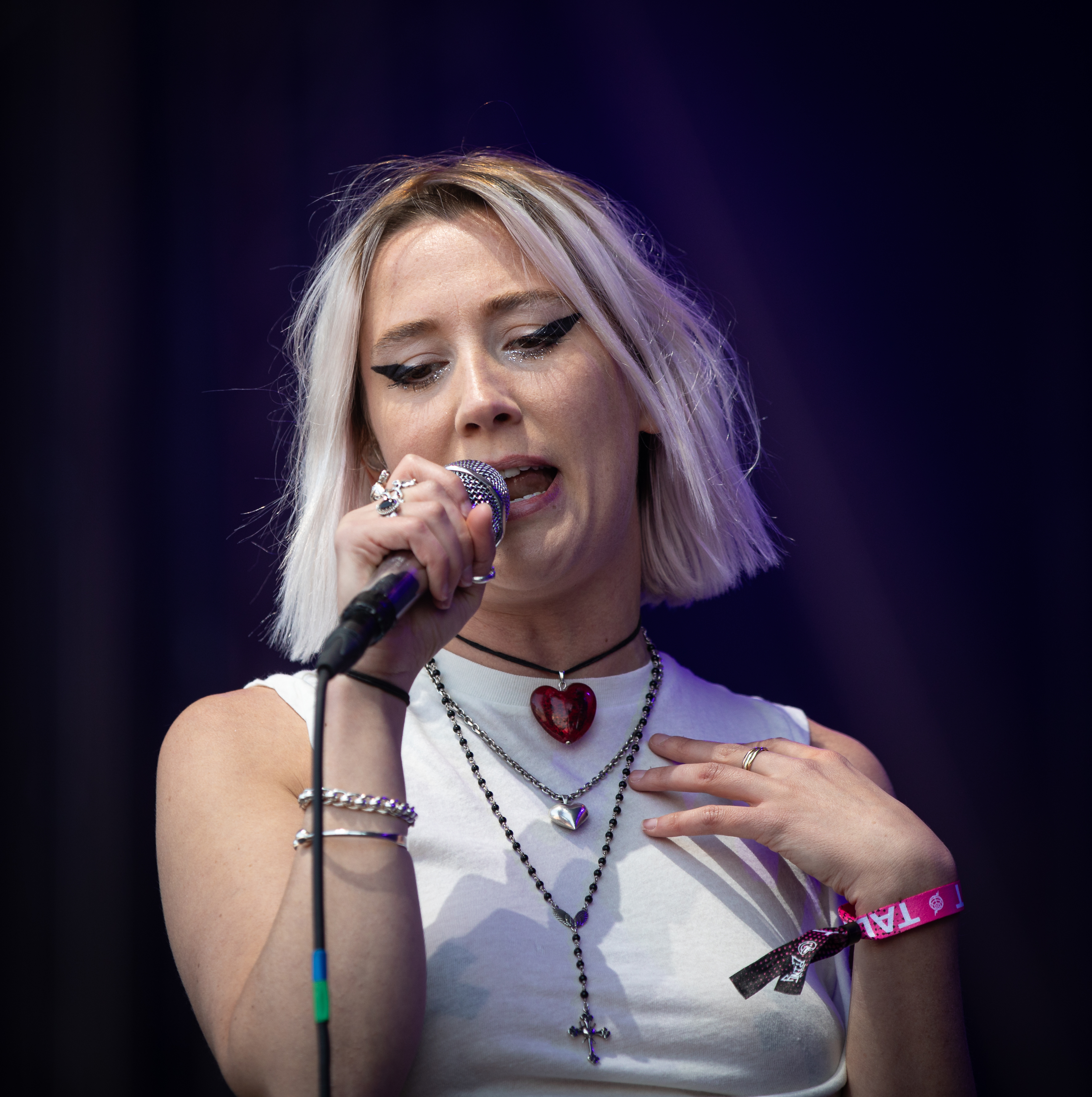
Theresa Jarvis at Rock am Ring 2023

=== First EPs and Don't Wait 'Til Tomorrow (2014–19) ===
Yonaka performed on the BBC Introducing stage at Radio 1's Big Weekend 2016 and released their debut EP, Heavy, the following year. 2018 saw the group issue two further EPs, Teach Me to Fight and Creature. The title track from Creature reached the top spot of the Kerrang! Rock Chart in December 2018.

In autumn 2018, the band went on a European tour with Bring Me the Horizon and Fever 333 and in October 2018, they played a four-track session at the BBC Maida Vale studios, during which they presented a live mashup of the songs "Jumpsuit" and "Paparazzi".

"Teach Me to Fight" was used as the official theme song for the WWE pay-per-view event Fastlane in March 2019 and in Fate: The Winx Saga.

In May 2019, Yonaka signed with American label Fueled by Ramen, ahead of the release of their debut album, Don't Wait 'Til Tomorrow, on 31 May. The album reached 38 on the UK Albums Chart and 10 on the UK Vinyl Albums Chart. The band were also nominated for Best British Newcomer at the 2019 Kerrang! Awards.

In December 2019, they featured on Bring Me the Horizon's song "Tapes", which appeared on their EP Music to Listen To....

=== Seize the Power (2020–2022) ===
In a session made in July 2020 for Amazon Music UK's Twitch channel, which was later deleted a month after the broadcast, Yonaka performed for the first time an unreleased song called "Ordinary".

On 27 January 2021, the band released "Seize the Power", the first official single from their mixtape of the same name. On the track, Yonaka commented: "It's been so long since we released new music and the time has finally come; this is a new chapter for us. We want you to get lost in a feeling of strength and empowerment when listening to this song". The mixtape was released on 15 July 2021 and featured appearances from Fever 333 and Barns Courtney. Yonaka appeared on Palaye Royale's 2023 Fever Dream European + UK tour to support Seize the Power.

=== Departure of Rob Mason and Welcome to My House (2023–2024) ===
In early 2023, drummer Rob Mason departed from the group, reducing it to only three full-time members.

The group released two singles that year, from their upcoming EP: "PANIC" in February and "Welcome to My House" in March. The EP, also titled Welcome to My House, came out in July.

=== Post-hiatus and Until You're Satisfied (2025–present) ===
In 2025, after a tumultuous hiatus, Yonaka reemerged as a trio, with lead vocalist Theresa Jarvis, guitarist George Edwards, and bassist Alex Crosby. They released three singles from their upcoming record: "Problems", "Cruel", and "Hit Me When I'm Sore". The album, Until You're Satisfied, came out in March 2026. "Cruel" was considered for entry into the Eurovision Song Contest, but the group ultimately decided not to participate.

In September 2026, Yonaka was set to support Charlotte Sands on her US tour, but they announced in August that they were forced to drop out for financial and logistical reasons.

== Band members ==
Current

- Theresa Jarvis – vocals (2014–present)
- George Edwards – guitars (2014–present)
- Alex Crosby – bass, synthesizer (2014–present)

Past

- Robert Mason – drums, percussion (2014–2023)
Yonaka at Rock am Ring 2023

Theresa Jarvis

George Edwards

Alex Crosby

== Discography ==
=== Studio albums ===
Title	Album details	Peak chart positions	
Title	Album details	UK	BEL
Don't Wait 'Til Tomorrow	Released: 31 May 2019; Label: Asylum (#9029546935); Formats: CD, LP, digital download	38	55
Until You're Satisfied	Released: 13 March 2026; Label: Distiller; Formats: CD, LP, digital download	25	—

=== EPs ===
Title	EP details
Heavy	Released: 6 October 2017; Label: Self-released; Formats: CD, digital download, vinyl
Teach Me to Fight	Released: 17 August 2018; Label: Asylum; Formats: CD, digital download, vinyl
Creature	Released: 9 November 2018; Label: Asylum; Formats: CD, digital download, vinyl
Welcome to My House	Released: 28 July 2023; Label: Republic; Formats: CD, digital download, vinyl

=== Mixtapes ===
Title	Album details	Peak chart positions	
Title	Album details	UK	SCO
Seize the Power	Released: 15 July 2021; Label: Creature; Formats: LP, digital download	— (Note: "Seize the Power" did not enter the UK Albums Chart but did reach number 9 on the UK Vinyl Albums chart.)	43

=== Singles ===
Single	Year	Peak chart positions		Album
Single	Year	UK	BEL	Album
"Ignorance"	2016	—	—	Non-album singles
"Drongo"	2016	—	—	Non-album singles
"Wouldn't Wanna Be Ya"	2017	—	—	Non-album singles
"Bubblegum"	2017	—	—	Heavy
"F.W.T.B."	2018	—	—	Non-album single
"Waves"	2018	—	—	Teach Me to Fight
"Own Worst Enemy"	2018	—	—	Creature
"Creature"	2018	—	—	Don't Wait 'Til Tomorrow
"Fired Up"	2018	—	39	Don't Wait 'Til Tomorrow
"Bad Company"	2019	—	—	Don't Wait 'Til Tomorrow
"Lose Our Heads"	2019	—	—	Don't Wait 'Til Tomorrow
"Seize the Power"	2021	—	—	Seize the Power
"Ordinary"	2021	—	—	Seize the Power
"Call Me a Saint"	2021	—	—	Seize the Power
"Panic"	2023	—	—	Welcome to My House
"Welcome to My House"	2023	—	—	Welcome to My House
"Predator"	2024	—	—	Non-album singles
"Fight for the Right"	2024	—	—	Non-album singles
"Problems"	2025	—	—	Until You're Satisfied
"Cruel"	2025	—	—	Until You're Satisfied

- Note that the single "Ignorance" was reworked, becoming "Awake", as included on the album Don't Wait 'Til Tomorrow.

=== Other appearances ===
Title	Year	Band	Album
"Tapes" (stylised as "±ªþ³§".)	2019	Bring Me the Horizon	Music to Listen To...
"Today"	2026	The Smashing Pumpkins	Sending Hearts to All My Dearies: A Tribute to the Smashing Pumpkins

=== Music videos ===
List of music videos, showing year released, director(s) name and album
Title	Year	Director(s)	Album/EP	Ref.
"Wouldn't Wanna Be Ya"	2017	Yonaka	Non-album single	
"Bubblegum"	2017	Yonaka	Heavy (EP)	
"Lose Our Heads"	2019	Yonaka	Don't Wait 'Til Tomorrow	
"Don't Wait 'Til Tomorrow	2019	Yonaka	Don't Wait 'Til Tomorrow	
"Rockstar"	2019	Yonaka	Don't Wait 'Til Tomorrow	
"Seize the Power"	2021	Jade Ang Jackman	Seize the Power	
