= List of UK R&B Albums Chart number ones of 2026 =

The logo of the Official Charts Company, responsible for compiling all of the official music charts in the United Kingdom, including the R&B albums chart.

The UK R&B Albums Chart is a weekly chart, first introduced in October 1994, that ranks the 40 biggest-selling albums that are classified in the R&B genre in the United Kingdom. The chart is compiled by the Official Charts Company, and is based on sales of CDs, downloads, vinyl and other formats over the previous seven days.

The following are the number-one albums of 2026

== Number-one albums ==
Issue date	Album	Artist(s)	Record label	Ref.
2 January	Back to Black	Amy Winehouse	Island	
9 January	Back to Black	Amy Winehouse	Island	
16 January	Before I Forget	The Kid Laroi	RCA	
23 January	Rebel	EsDeeKid	XV/Lizzy	
30 January	Back to Black	Amy Winehouse	Island	
6 February	Back to Black	Amy Winehouse	Island	
13 February	Piss in the Wind	Joji	Palace Creek	
20 February	Back to Black	Amy Winehouse	Island	
27 February	To Whom This May Concern	Jill Scott	Blues Babe	
6 March	Back to Black	Amy Winehouse	Island	
13 March ^{[b]}	The Boy Who Played the Harp	Dave	Neighbourhood	
20 March ^{[b]}	The Boy Who Played the Harp	Dave	Neighbourhood	
27 March	Back to Black	Amy Winehouse	Island	
3 April	Sounds for Someone	Elmiene	Polydor	
10 April	Distracted	Thundercat	Brainfeeder	
17 April	Casino	Baby Keem	Columbia	
24 April	Chapter 1	Sault	Forever Living Originals	
1 May	The Mocking Stars	Lausse the Cat	Velvet Blues	
8 May	Fenian	Kneecap	Heavenly	
15 May	Fenian	Kneecap	Heavenly	
22 May	Fenian	Kneecap	Heavenly	
29 May	Fenian	Kneecap	Heavenly	
5 June	SE9 Part 1	Skye Newman	Columbia	
12 June	Do That Again	Malcolm Todd	Ministry of Sound	
19 June	Back to Black	Amy Winehouse	Island	
26 June	The Wizard	M Huncho	MYB, EGA	
3 July	Original Pirate Material	The Streets	Locked On	
10 July	Back to Black	Amy Winehouse	Island	
17 July	The Ends Never Ends	Joe James	Neighbourbood	
24 July	The Real Me	Future	Freebandz/Epic	
31 July	Lost Tapes	Nines	Empire/Zino	
7 August	Back to Black	Amy Winehouse	Island	
14 August	Therapy at the Club	Flo	EMI	
21 August	Yours Truly	Ariana Grande	Island	
28 August	Trapo 2	K-Trap	K-Trap	
4 September	Thank You	Mike D	Fontana	
11 September	B'Day	Beyoncé	Columbia	
18 September	Back to Black	Amy Winehouse	Island	
25 September	Back to Black	Amy Winehouse	Island	
2 October	Popstar	Tinashe	Atlantic	
9 October	B'Day	Beyoncé	Columbia	
16 October	Back to Black	Amy Winehouse	Island	
23 October	Back to Black	Amy Winehouse	Island	
30 October	Back to Black	Amy Winehouse	Island	
6 November	Young Nina	Nines	Zino	
13 November	The Fork and Knife	Skepta	Epic	
20 November	Back to Black	Amy Winehouse	Island	

== Notes ==
- ^{a} - The album was simultaneously number-one on the UK Albums Chart.
- ^{b} - The artist was simultaneously number-one on the R&B Singles Chart.

== See also ==
- List of UK Albums Chart number ones of the 2020s
- List of UK R&B Singles Chart number ones of 2026
