= Welcome to My House (Yonaka EP) =

EP by Yonaka
- Released: July 28, 2023
- Genres: rock; alt rock; pop
- Length: 21:38
- Label: Republic Records

Yonaka chronology
Seize the Power (2021)	Welcome to My House (2023)	Until You're Satisfied (2026)

Welcome to My House is an EP released by English rock group Yonaka in 2023. It is the fourth EP that the group has released and marks the first release from the group since the departure of drummer, Rob Mason.

== Background ==
Prior to the release of the EP, drummer Rob Mason parted ways with the group in early 2023. Yonaka, now a trio, released two singles from the EP — "Panic" and the track "Welcome to My House". A music video for "Panic" was released alongside the release of the single.

Yonaka released the EP on July 28, 2023, along with music videos for "By the Time You're Reading This", "Give Me My Halo" and "Hands Off My Money".

Despite Rob Mason's departure from the group, he is still credited in the album.

== Themes and composition ==
Welcome to My House heavily revolves around front woman, Theresa Jarvis's personal struggles with her mental health, each track telling a personal story of hers. The EP doesn't adhere to any particular genre of music, Jarvis states "It's not like one specific genre, or one specific concept."

Bassist Alex Crosby states the song "Welcome to My House" was inspired by Radiohead and Paolo Nutini's album Caustic Love. Crosby states that he didn't think the beat would work with the group but was encouraged by Jarvis to continue working on it. The lyrics reflect conversations Jarvis had with her therapist. Crosby also states that an acoustic sound recorded to his phones voice notes ended up on the song.

The song "Panic" is about a panic attack that Jarvis suffered, and about her anxiety. Jarvis states "I've got the angle and devil on my shoulder constantly arguing about which road I should go down..."

== Track listing ==
All tracks are written by Alex Crosby, George Edwards, Theresa Jarvis and Rob Mason with Zakk Cervini as an additional writer on tracks 1 and 4.

Welcome to My House track listing
No.	Title	Length
1.	"By the Time You're Reading This"	3:11
2.	"Panic"	2:54
3.	"Welcome to My House"	3:27
4.	"Give Me My Halo"	3:37
5.	"I Want More"	3:14
6.	"I Don't Care"	2:57
7.	"Hands Off My Money"	2:29
Total length:		21:48
