= Broke Records =

American record label

- Parent company: Create Music Group
- Founded: 2023
- Founder: Andre Benz; Brandon De Oliveira
- Distributor: Create Music Group
- Genre: Various
- Country of origin: United States
- Location: New York City, New York
- Official website: broke.nyc

Broke Records is an American independent record label founded in 2023 by Andre Benz and Brandon De Oliveira. Based in New York City, the label operates under Create Music Group and focuses on digital marketing strategies, particularly on social media platforms like TikTok.

== History and operations ==
Broke Records was founded in 2023 by Andre Benz and Brandon De Oliveira as an independent record label, publisher and distributor headquartered in New York City. The label was established following Create Music Group's acquisition of a majority interest in Benz's previous ventures, The Nations, YouTube network and the Lowly record label, in 2022. The label has established several strategic partnerships, including a joint venture with Isekai Records launched in 2024. This partnership worked on viral hits by artists, including Ndotz and Stepz.

The label's business model centers on rapid response digital marketing and viral content promotion. The company can sign a record and turn around content in less than 24 hours, with the complete process of finding a record, negotiating a deal, ingesting it and marketing it taking less than 48 hours, compared to traditional record labels which typically require three to four weeks for similar processes.

In 2025, Broke Records signed several notable artists including Julia Cole, a country singer-songwriter signed in August 2025, which marked the label's first foray into country music, and Zhu, a Grammy Award-nominated electronic artist signed to an exclusive distribution deal. The label's roster includes artists across multiple genres: Sevdaliza, Bbno$, Sosocamo, RJ Pasin, BLP Kosher, DC the Don, Blackbear, Sainte, Adore, Kenny Allstar with Headie One, CamelPhat & Rhodes, Cult Member and NCTS. Major releases include "Embrace It" by Ndotz, which amassed almost 250 million streams on Spotify and ranked as the fourth most-streamed UK rap track in 2024. "Montagem Mysterious Game" (2023) by LXNGVX, a funk automotivo track that became one of the label's early viral successes and Zhu's "Faded (Blacklizt Version)" (2025), a reimagining of Zhu's 2014 hit "Faded".

In 2024, Broke Records achieved over 15 Billboard-charting singles without major label backing. Two of the label's artists landed on Spotify's flagship Today's Top Hits and the Global Top 50 playlists. Combined, the label's top performers have generated over one billion streams across digital platforms. Broke Records also launches a Joint Venture with Isekai Records to expand into UK.
