= Family Matters (Skye Newman song) =

Single by Skye Newman

from the EP SE9 Part 1
- Released: 16 May 2025
- Length: 2:57
- Label: Columbia
- Songwriters: Skye Newman; Luis Navidad; Sabrian Sledge; Madison Walsh
- Producers: Boo; Luis Navidad

Skye Newman singles chronology
"Hairdresser" (2025)	"Family Matters" (2025)	"Out Out" (2025)

"Family Matters" is a song by British singer-songwriter Skye Newman. "Family Matters" was released on 16 May 2025 through Columbia Records as the second single from her debut EP, SE9 Part 1. The song peaked at number five on the UK Singles Chart.

== Composition ==
"Family Matters" is a "delicate yet powerful meditation on intergenerational healing," showcasing Newman's ability to balance "folk-inspired storytelling with contemporary indie-pop sensibilities". The song mainly features a "hauntingly sparse arrangement", surrounded by a fingerpicked guitar and atmospheric harmonies. Newman's vocal performance was noted for its "restrained intensity", comparable to Adrianne Lenker of Big Thief.

== Critical reception ==
Sam Taylor of Dork describes "Family Matters" as a "stripped-back, emotionally charged" song that features Newman's "intimate songwriting and soul-baring vocal delivery". Taylor highlights the song's exploration of relationships with family members and inner turmoil and compares its rawness to the music of artists like Phoebe Bridgers and Lucy Dacus. The minimalist production with the use of acoustic guitars and soft harmonies was said to highlight the theme of lyrical fragility. The writers at Wonderland thought the song was a more "mature" offering than her previous single, inviting listeners to her "authentic and humanistic lyrical acumen".

== Charts ==
=== Weekly charts ===
Weekly chart performance for "Family Matters"
Chart (2025)	Peak position
Ireland (IRMA)	26
Lithuania Airplay (TopHit)	45
UK Singles (OCC)	5
UK Hip Hop/R&B (OCC)	1

=== Monthly charts ===
Monthly chart performance for "Family Matters"
Chart (2025)	Peak position
Lithuania Airplay (TopHit)	49

=== Year-end charts ===
Year-end chart performance for "Family Matters"
Chart (2025)	Position
UK Singles (OCC)	69

== Certifications ==
Certifications for "Family Matters"
Region	Certification	Certified units/sales
United Kingdom (BPI)	Platinum	600,000^{‡}
^{‡} Sales+streaming figures based on certification alone.
