= SE9 Part 2 =

EP by Skye Newman
- Released: 29 May 2026
- Length: 26:36
- Label: Columbia
- Producer: Al Shux; Boo; Ed Thomas; Jonah Stevens; Luis Navidad; Maverick Sabre

Skye Newman chronology
SE9 Part 1 (2025)	SE9 Part 2 (2026)

Singles from SE9 Part 2
- 1. "Walk" Released: 27 February 2026; 2. "Woman I Am" Released: 24 April 2026

SE9 Part 2 is the second EP by English singer-songwriter Skye Newman. The EP was released on 29 May 2026 by Columbia Records.

Of the project, Newman said, "'SE9 Part 2' is all about the journey of my life the past few years... it's an insight into the strength I've gained and how much I've grown and learnt through woman hood; its acceptance, guidance and power put into music."

== Reception ==
Robin Murray of Clash says, "An aptly-titled follow-up, 'SE9 Part 2' finds Skye speaking from the heart. An artist whose feelings sit close to her skin, the material documents her evolution as a young woman in music, tackling health difficulties, heartbreak... and the odd moment of joy, too."

== Track listing ==
SE9 Part 2 track listing
No.	Title	Writer(s)	Length
1.	"Man of the House"	Skye Newman; Boo; Luis Navidad	2:35
2.	"Crawling"	Newman; Ed Thomas; Michael Stafford	3:10
3.	"Walk"	Newman; Boo; Navidad; Chrissi	2:57
4.	"Too Far South"	Newman; Jonah Stevens	4:06
5.	"Traumatised"	Newman; Stevens	4:11
6.	"Lost Myself to a Man"	Newman; Alexander Shuckburgh	2:30
7.	"Woman I Am"	Newman; Boo; Navidad	3:31
8.	"Vicious Cycle"	Newman; Stevens	3:36
Total length:			26:36
