= Don't Wait 'Til Tomorrow =

Studio album by Yonaka
- Released: May 31, 2019
- Genres: rock; alt rock
- Length: 38:00
- Label: Asylum Records
- Producers: Alex Crosby; George Edwards; Theresa Jarvis; Rob Mason

Yonaka chronology
Creature (2018)	Don't Wait 'Til Tomorrow (2019)	Seize the Power (2021)

Don't Wait 'Til Tomorrow is the debut album of English rock band Yonaka. Released in 2019, the entirely self produced album follows three EPs from the group.

== Background ==
In February 2019, Yonaka released "Bad Company" the lead single off their debut album Don't Wait "Til Tomorrow. The group released two more singles "Lose Our Heads" and "Don't Wait 'Til Tomorrow", which shares its name with the album. The full album was released on May 31st of that year. They also released a music video for the songs "Rockstar" and "Don't Wait 'Til Tomorrow."

Prior to the release of the of Don't Wait "Til Tomorrow, they released two singles from two of their EPs, "Creature" from the EP of the same name and "Fired Up" from Teach Me To Fight, both of which were released in 2018. These two singles were included in the album as well as "Awake" a song the group had released in 2016 under the name "Ignorance".

== Composition and themes ==
Metal health had always been at the forefront of Yonaka's discography. The song "Bad Company" as about the struggles of living with depression. The group explains "When you wake up one day and you have bad company and you don't know how to get rid of them. So, you learn to live with it and you ask for help but it's in you, so you learn to keep it [with you]." The song "Awake" is a remastered version of the group's 2026 single "Ignorance", however, "Awake" features a more grunge attitude. Front woman Theresa Jarvis explains "... It was a song we still love, and we wanted to put an original part of the band forming etc on the album. So, we gave it a revamp..." Meanwhile, "Guilty (for your love)" is one of the only love songs that Yonaka has released, Jarvis stated in a 2025 interview with Kerrang!. It's also one of the only songs on the album that the group performs as an acoustic during live performances. Jarvis also explains about the song "Creature", "It's a love song but in the opposite way of writing a love song, it talks about the deeper meaning of love, not the dreamed up one."

The album also deals with Yonaka's own aspirations as a rock group. The group describes "Don't Wait 'Til Tomorrow" as their mantra, "from a band who've always grabbed every opportunity ... and always chased more".

== Track listing ==
All music is composed by Alex Crosby, George Edwards, Theresa Jarvis and Rob Mason.

No.	Title	Length
1.	"Bad Company"	3:57
2.	"Lose Our Heads"	3:21
3.	"Awake"	3:55
4.	"Guilty (for your Love)"	3:37
5.	"Rockstar"	3:43
6.	"Creature"	3:06
7.	"Don't Wait 'til Tomorrow"	3:19
8.	"Punch Bag"	3:17
9.	"Fired Up"	3:38
10.	"Wake Up"	3:38
11.	"The Cure"	3:27
Total length:		38:00

all credits adapted from Spotify.
