= List of UK Rock & Metal Albums Chart number ones of 2026 =

The UK Rock & Metal Albums Chart is a record chart which ranks the best-selling rock and heavy metal albums in the United Kingdom. Compiled and published by the Official Charts Company, the data is based on each album's weekly physical sales and digital downloads.

== Chart history ==
Issue date	Album	Artist	Record label	Ref.
2 January	Wish You Were Here	Pink Floyd	Harvest	
9 January	Wish You Were Here	Pink Floyd	Harvest	
16 January	Alter Bridge	Alter Bridge	Napalm	
23 January	Krushers of the World	Kreator	Nuclear Blast	
30 January	Megadeth	Megadeth	Frontiers Music	
6 February	Megadeth	Megadeth	Frontiers Music	
13 February	Woodcut	Big Big Train	Inside Out	
20 February	50 Years of Phaedra - At the Barbican	Tangerine Dream	Kscope	
27 February	Outerstellar	Michael Monroe	Silver Lining Music	
6 March	The Great Satan	Rob Zombie	Nuclear Blast	
13 March	Albini Sessions (Benefit for Letters)	Fugazi	Fugazi	
20 March	Until You're Satisfied	Yonaka	Distiller	
27 March	Closer to the Sun	Tyketto	Silver Lining	
3 April	Nightmare Tripping	Don Broco	Fearless	
10 April	Vol. II	Angine de Poitrine	Angine de Poitrine	
17 April	Lose Your Self	Enter Shikari	SO	
24 April	You Got This (Note: You Got This was also number one in the main Official Albums Chart the same week.)	Skindred	Earache	
1 May	Your Favorite Toy	Foo Fighters	Columbia	
8 May	Your Favorite Toy	Foo Fighters	Columbia	
15 May	Wired	Basement	Run for Cover	
22 May	Cruel Intentions	Karma Effect	Earache	
29 May	Prang	A	Cooking Vinyl	
5 June	Ei8ht	Shinedown	Atlantic	
12 June	Sanctuary	Evanescence	Music For Nations	
19 June	Vol. II	Angine de Poitrine	Angine de Poitrine	
26 June	The Best Of	Judas Priest	Sony Music	
3 July	The Wow! Signal (Note: The Wow! Signal was also number one in the main Official Albums Chart the same week.)	Muse	Warner	
10 July	Splat!	Deep Purple	EarMusic	
17 July	Danger Days: The True Lives of the Fabulous Killjoys	My Chemical Romance	Reprise	
24 July	Decades	Motionless in White	Roadrunner	
31 July	Danger Days: The True Lives of the Fabulous Killjoys	My Chemical Romance	Reprise	
7 August	In a Glass House	Gentle Giant	Vertigo	
14 August	Tanzneid	Electric Callboy	Century Media	
21 August	Monsters We Made	Kris Barras Band	Earache	
28 August	Three Cheers for Sweet Revenge	My Chemical Romance	Reprise	
4 September	Everything's Falling	The Warning	EMI	
11 September	Blood of Your Empire	President	Atlantic	
18 September	Bloodletting	RØRY	Sadcore	
25 September	Cursum Perficio	Anthrax	Nuclear Blast and Megaforce	
2 October	Come This Madness	Europe	Silver Lining Music/Hell & Back	
9 October	Fire and Folklore	These Wicked Rivers	Fat Earth Records	
16 October	New Promise Land Incorporated	The Temperance Movement	Earache	
23 October	Return to the Red Planet	Rick Wakeman	Madfish	
30 October (Note: The Black Parade was also number one in the main Official Albums Chart the same week.)	The Black Parade	My Chemical Romance	Reprise	
6 November	Everything Under the Sun	Nickelback	Nickelback	
13 November	Dead Company	Royal Blood	Warner	
20 November	Flawed By Design	Scarlet Rebels	Earache	

== See also ==
- List of UK Rock & Metal Singles Chart number ones of 2026
