= SE9 Part 1 =

EP by Skye Newman
- Released: 24 October 2025
- Length: 18:04
- Label: Columbia
- Producer: Boo; Luis Navidad

Skye Newman chronology
SE9 Part 1 (2025)	SE9 Part 2 (2026)

Singles from SE9 Part 1
- 1. "Hairdresser" Released: 28 March 2025; 2. "Family Matters" Released: 16 May 2025; 3. "Out Out" Released: 18 July 2025; 4. "FU & UF" Released: 24 October 2025; 5. "Smoke Rings" Released: 29 January 2026

SE9 Part 1 is the debut EP by English singer-songwriter Skye Newman. The EP was released on 24 October 2025 and it peaked at number 18 on the UK Albums Chart.

Newman said "SE9 is where I lived, mostly, during the first 20 years of my life. It's about why I am the person I am today. Early family life, trauma, internal battles. It's incredibly personal to me. It shows you the life I've lived so far."

== Reception ==
FrontView said "SE9 Part 1 showcases the full range of Skye's vocal and emotional depth. Each song reflects the world that shaped her - from the chaos of her South London upbringing to the introspective calm that currently defines her artistry."

== Track listing ==
All tracks are written by Skye Newman, Boo, and Luis Navidad, except where noted.

SE9 Part 1 track listing
No.	Title	Writer(s)	Length
1.	"FU & UF"		2:39
2.	"Hairdresser"		3:27
3.	"My Addiction"		3:31
4.	"Out Out"		2:41
5.	"Family Matters"		2:57
6.	"Smoke Rings"	Newman; Jo Hill; Boo; Luis Navidad	2:46
Total length:			18:04

== Charts ==
Chart performance for SE9 Part 1
Chart (2025–2026)	Peak position
Irish Albums (IRMA)	60
Scottish Albums (OCC)	7
UK Albums (OCC)	11
UK R&B Albums (OCC)	1

== Certifications ==
Certifications for SE9 Part 1
Region	Certification	Certified units/sales
United Kingdom (BPI)	Silver	60,000^{‡}
^{‡} Sales+streaming figures based on certification alone.
