= All On Red =

Studio album by Kezia Gill
- Released: January 23, 2026
- Genre: Country
- Length: 37:32
- Label: Spinefarm
- Producer: Alyssa Bonagura

Kezia Gill chronology
Misfit (2023)	All On Red (2026)

Singles from All On Red
- 1. "Dublin's Outta Whiskey" Released: 22 August 2025; 2. "If Heaven Has a Honkytonk" Released: 10 November 2025; 3. "Gut Feeling" Released: 15 January 2026

All On Red is the major label debut studio album by British country music singer-songwriter Kezia Gill. It was released by Snakefarm Records on 23 January 2026 and follows her two previous self-released albums Kezia (2017) and Misfit (2023). All On Red was produced and mixed in Nashville by Americana singer Alyssa Bonagura and contains eleven tracks, all of which were co-written by Gill herself. It was preceded by the singles "Dublin's Outta Whiskey", "If Heaven Has a Honkytonk", and "Gut Feeling". The album reached number one on the UK Country Albums Chart.

== Background ==
The album was announced on 17 June 2025 alongside Gill's signing to Snakefarm and details of her 2026 UK tour. Of the album, Gill stated, "this is the best album I’ve written; it feels like a body of work that combines the sound and skill of Nashville with what I stand for in terms of storytelling and honesty as a proud British artist. The title of the record encapsulates the process. I went all in… I put it ‘All On Red’!"

Discussing the genesis of the project, Gill expressed that she saw All On Red as her chance to prove herself in country music, and that signing with Snakefarm Records enabled her to take her career to the next level, explaining that, "this whole record was really just me going hard or going home. For a long time I've been building something, all independently and, dare I say it, at an amateur level and I just knew that if I wanted people to see me as something more, something legit then I needed to produce something legit." She also highlighted the importance of bringing her own authenticity as a British woman from Derby with Irish heritage to the genre, declaring, "there's nothing on the record that is not something I wouldn't do or say or have felt. I'm an absolute Country fan, I love songs about trucks, the Bro-Country movement and small-town life but that wouldn't be authentic for me to sing about." Gill and Bonagura were introduced at a festival through a mutual friend, fellow British country artist Jade Helliwell, and Gill expressed that, "Alyssa just gets the sound that I want to make. She wasn't trying to make it too shiny or too American – she just nailed it and also co-wrote four of the songs on the album, to the point where she inspires me to be a better writer as well now."

== Track listing ==
All On Red
No.	Title	Writer(s)	Length
1.	"Life You Always Dreamed Of"	Kezia Gill	3:30
2.	"Dublin's Outta Whiskey"	Gill; Clint Lagerberg; Matt Stell	2:38
3.	"Whiskey In a Wine Glass"	Alyssa Bonagura; Gill	2:51
4.	"Love You Next"	Bonagura; Gill	3:25
5.	"Ride Or Die"	Gill; Jade Helliwell	3:44
6.	"Gut Feeling"	Gill	3:10
7.	"Money In the Bank"	Gill	3:11
8.	"Barbed Wire"	Gill	3:51
9.	"If Heaven Has a Honkytonk"	Bonagura; Gill	3:25
10.	"What If"	Gill	3:33
11.	"This House Would Sing"	Bonagura; Gill	4:09
Total length:			37:32

== Charts ==
Chart performance for All On Red
Chart (2026)	Peak position
UK Albums Sales (OCC)	61
UK Country Albums (OCC)	1

== Personnel ==
Credits adapted from Tidal.

- Kathie Baillie - background vocals
- Alyssa Bonagura - background vocals, acoustic guitar, electric guitar, production, mixing
- Michael Bonagura - background vocals
- Dave Dorn - keyboards
- Fred Eltringham - drums
- Kezia Gill - vocals
- Mark Hill - bass guitar
- Sam Hunter - acoustic guitar
- Gabriel Klein - drums, keyboard
- Gideon Klein - bass guitar, acoustic guitar, mandolin
- Tony Lucido - bass guitar
- Pat McGrath - acoustic guitar
- Mark McNelly - guitar
- Ian Miller - keyboard
- Roger Nichols - mixing
- Jerry Roe - drums
- Steve Shirley - acoustic guitar
