= Trap Nation =

American music channel

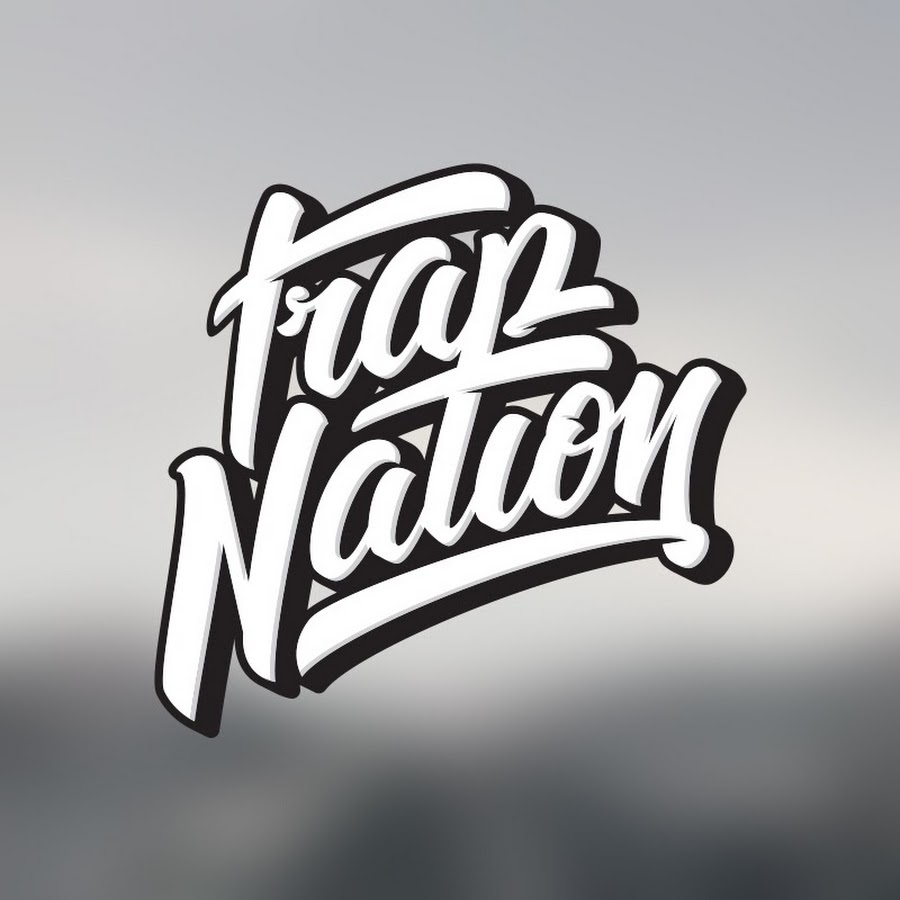
- The current logo, first used in November 2016
- Born: Andre Benz; February 4, 1997 (age 29)

YouTube information
- Channel: TrapNation
- Years active: 2012–present
- Genres: Chill music; trap; future bass
- Subscribers: 30.1 million
- Views: 14.9 billion
- Last updated: October 21, 2025
- Website: nations.io

Trap Nation is an American music promoter that is primarily known for releasing electronic music on its YouTube channel.

== History ==
Trap Nation was founded in September 2012 by Andre Willem Benz & Kevin Field when they were 15 years old. Alongside Trap Nation, Benz expanded into creating other channels, the first of which, Chill Nation, was founded in February 2014. The channels have since gone on to be managed by other curators, employed by The Nations, a company which encompasses all the channels and Lowly Palace. As of April 2020, Benz still runs the Trap Nation channel himself alongside another curator named Jean.

By the end of 2016, Trap Nation was included in the ten fastest-growing YouTube channels by Tubefilter, receiving an average of 70 million new plays a week.

As of 2021, Trap Nation could claim more than 30 million subscribers and an average of 560,000 new subscribers a month.

=== Lowly Palace ===
In September 2016, Trap Nation's independent record label, Lowly Palace, was founded. In less than a year, the channel has amassed almost 500,000 subscribers.

== Events ==
In 2016, Trap Nation made its first live-event debut at Danbury, CT, where Botnet and Lukas performed.

Trap Nation participated at the SXSW event in March 2017, featuring artists Illenium, San Holo, Whethan, and more.

In June 2017, Trap Nation held the largest art car event at EDC, reaching a crowd of over 4,000 people. The lineup featured acts such Alan Walker, Troyboi, Boombox Cartel, Autograf, and others played.

In 2020, it organized the Room Service Music Festival.

In April 2022, The Nations (parent-company and owner of Trap Nation and other Nation branded channels) sold a majority stake in ownership to Create Music Group for an undisclosed amount.

== Accolades ==
In 2015, Trap Nation was included in YouTube's top 10 preferred Google / YouTube music partners.

In June 2017, Trap Nation was the 44th-most-subscribed channel on YouTube and had accumulated more than five billion total views. Trap Nation was also ranked by Billboard as the #1 dance curator on YouTube alongside Monstercat, MrSuicideSheep, Proximity, and Majestic Casual.
