= List of UK R&B Singles Chart number ones of 2026 =

The logo of the Official Charts Company, responsible for compiling all of the official music charts in the United Kingdom, including the R&B singles chart.

The UK R&B Singles Chart is a weekly chart that ranks the 40 biggest-selling singles and albums that are classified in the R&B genre in the United Kingdom. The chart is compiled by the Official Charts Company, and is based on both physical, and digital sales.

The following are the songs which have topped the UK R&B Singles Chart in 2026.

== Number-one singles ==
Chart date (week ending)	Song	Artist(s)	Record label(s)	References
1 January	"Raindance"	Dave and Tems	Neighbourhood	
8 January	"Raindance"	Dave and Tems	Neighbourhood	
15 January	"Raindance"	Dave and Tems	Neighbourhood	
22 January	"Raindance"	Dave and Tems	Neighbourhood	
29 January ^{[a]}	"Raindance"	Dave and Tems	Neighbourhood	
5 February	"Raindance"	Dave and Tems	Neighbourhood	
12 February ^{[a]}	"Raindance"	Dave and Tems	Neighbourhood	
19 February	"Raindance"	Dave and Tems	Neighbourhood	
26 February	"Raindance"	Dave and Tems	Neighbourhood	
5 March	"Raindance"	Dave and Tems	Neighbourhood	
12 March	"Raindance"	Dave and Tems	Neighbourhood	
19 March ^{[b]}	"Raindance"	Dave and Tems	Neighbourhood	
26 March ^{[b]}	"Raindance"	Dave and Tems	Neighbourhood	
2 April	"Raindance"	Dave and Tems	Neighbourhood	
9 April	"Raindance"	Dave and Tems	Neighbourhood	
16 April	"Raindance"	Dave and Tems	Neighbourhood	
23 April	"Raindance"	Dave and Tems	Neighbourhood	
30 April	"Raindance"	Dave and Tems	Neighbourhood	
7 May	"Raindance"	Dave and Tems	Neighbourhood	
14 May	"Raindance"	Dave and Tems	Neighbourhood	
21 May	"Human Nature"	Michael Jackson	Epic	
28 May	"Janice STFU"	Drake	OVO/Republic	
4 June	"Janice STFU"	Drake	OVO/Republic	
11 June	"Janice STFU"	Drake	OVO/Republic	
18 June	"Janice STFU"	Drake	OVO/Republic	
25 June	"Janice STFU"	Drake	OVO/Republic	
2 July	"Janice STFU"	Drake	OVO/Republic	
9 July	"Janice STFU"	Drake	OVO/Republic	
16 July	"Raindance"	Dave and Tems	Neighbourhood	
23 July	"Material Lover"	Sienna Spiro	Capitol/Method	
30 July	"Material Lover"	Sienna Spiro	Capitol/Method	
6 August	"Material Lover"	Sienna Spiro	Capitol/Method	
13 August	"Petal"	Ariana Grande	Republic	
20 August	"Petal"	Ariana Grande	Republic	
27 August	"Material Lover"	Sienna Spiro	Capitol/Method	
3 September	"Material Lover"	Sienna Spiro	Capitol/Method	
10 September	"Material Lover"	Sienna Spiro	Capitol/Method	
17 September	"Material Lover"	Sienna Spiro	Capitol/Method	
24 September	"Material Lover"	Sienna Spiro	Capitol/Method	
1 October	"Material Lover"	Sienna Spiro	Capitol/Method	
8 October	"Raindance"	Dave and Tems	Neighbourhood	
15 October	"Raindance"	Dave and Tems	Neighbourhood	
22 October	"Material Lover"	Sienna Spiro	Capitol/Method	
29 October	"Material Lover"	Sienna Spiro	Capitol/Method	
5 November	"Thriller"	Michael Jackson	Epic	
12 November	"Thriller"	Michael Jackson	Epic	
19 November	"Raindance"	Dave and Tems	Neighbourhood	
26 November	"Shotta's"	Season 25	Broke Isekai Soundon	

== Notes ==
- ^{a} - The single was simultaneously number one on the UK Singles Chart.
- ^{b} - The artist was simultaneously number one on the R&B Albums Chart.

== See also ==
- List of UK Singles Chart number ones of 2026
- List of UK R&B Albums Chart number ones of 2026
- List of UK Dance Singles Chart number ones of 2026
