= Skye Newman =

English singer-songwriter (born 2003)

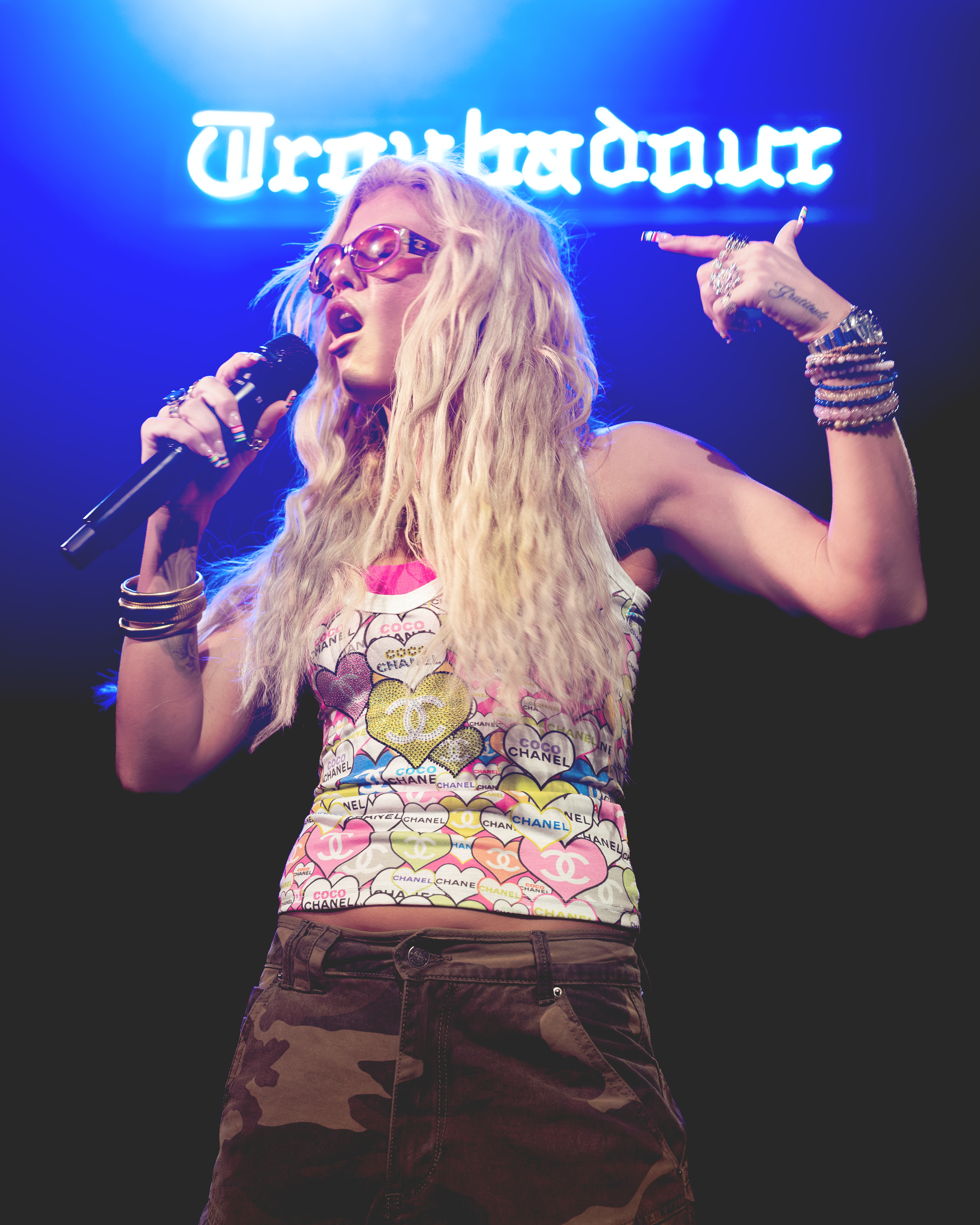
- Newman performing in 2026

Background information
- Born: 9 November 2003 (age 23); London, England
- Genres: Neo soul; R&B; pop; indie rock
- Occupations: Singer; songwriter
- Instruments: Vocals
- Years active: 2025–present
- Label: Columbia
- Website: www.skyenewman.com

Skye Newman (born 9 November 2003) is an English singer-songwriter from south-east London.

Her debut single, "Hairdresser", entered the UK Singles Chart upon its release in March 2025, peaking at number 15 in April. Her second single, "Family Matters" became her first UK top 10 hit, reaching number five in June 2025. This was followed by her debut extended play (EP), SE9 Part 1, which was released in October 2025.

== Artistry ==
Hailing from south-east London, specifically SE9, Newman has cited her aunt Moona, a jazz and blues singer, as a formative influence on her music, singing Cup Song at her funeral.

She attended BRIT Kids, a BRIT School Saturday School for kids and teenagers, but failed her auditions for BRIT School.

She has named Amy Winehouse, Adele, Bob Marley, and Eminem among her musical inspirations.

== Discography ==
=== Extended plays ===
List of extended plays, with selected details and chart positions
Title	Details	Peak chart positions			Certifications
Title	Details	UK	UK R&B	IRE	Certifications
SE9 Part 1	Released: 24 October 2025; Label: Columbia; Format: Digital download, streaming	11	1	60	BPI: Silver
SE9 Part 2	Released: 29 May 2026; Label: Columbia; Format: Digital download, streaming	—	—	—	
"—" denotes recording did not chart in that territory.

=== Singles ===
List of singles as a lead artist, with selected chart positions and certifications, showing year released and album name
Title	Year	Peak chart positions							Certifications	Album
Title	Year	UK	UK R&B	EST Air.	GER Air.	IRE	JPN Over.	LTU Air.	Certifications	Album
"Hairdresser"	2025	15	3	—	—	76	—	—	BPI: Gold	SE9 Part 1
"Family Matters"	2025	5	1	—	—	26	—	45	BPI: Platinum	SE9 Part 1
"Out Out"	2025	50	10	—	—	—	—	—		SE9 Part 1
"FU & UF"	2025	16	2	74	—	52	—	50	BPI: Silver	SE9 Part 1
"Lonely Girl"	2025	100	26	—	84	—	14	—		Non-album single
"Smoke Rings"	2026	—	—	—	—	—	—	—		SE9 Part 1
"Walk"	2026	48	7	—	—	—	—	—		SE9 Part 2
"Woman I Am"	2026	—	—	—	—	—	—	—		SE9 Part 2
"Survival"	2026	—	—	—	—	—	—	—		Non-album single
"—" denotes recording did not chart in that territory.

=== Other charted songs ===
List of other charted songs, with selected chart positions, showing year released and album name
Title	Year	Peak chart positions		Album
Title	Year	UK	UK R&B	Album
"My Addiction"	2025	50	17	SE9 Part 1

== Awards and nominations ==
Year	Organisation	Category	Nominee(s)/work(s)	Result	Ref.
2025	Notion New Music Awards	Best R&B	Herself	Nominated	
2026	BBC Radio 1	Sound of 2026	Herself	Won	
2026	Brit Awards	Best Breakthrough Artist	Herself	Nominated	
2026	Brit Awards	Song of the Year	"Family Matters"	Nominated	
2026	MOBO Awards	Best Newcomer	Herself	Nominated	

== Tours ==
Headlining

- The Woman I Am Tour (2026)
- The Survival Tour (2026)

Supporting

- Lewis Capaldi – UK and Ireland Tour (2025)
- Harry Styles – Together, Together (2026)
