= Andre Benz =

American music executive and digital entrepreneur

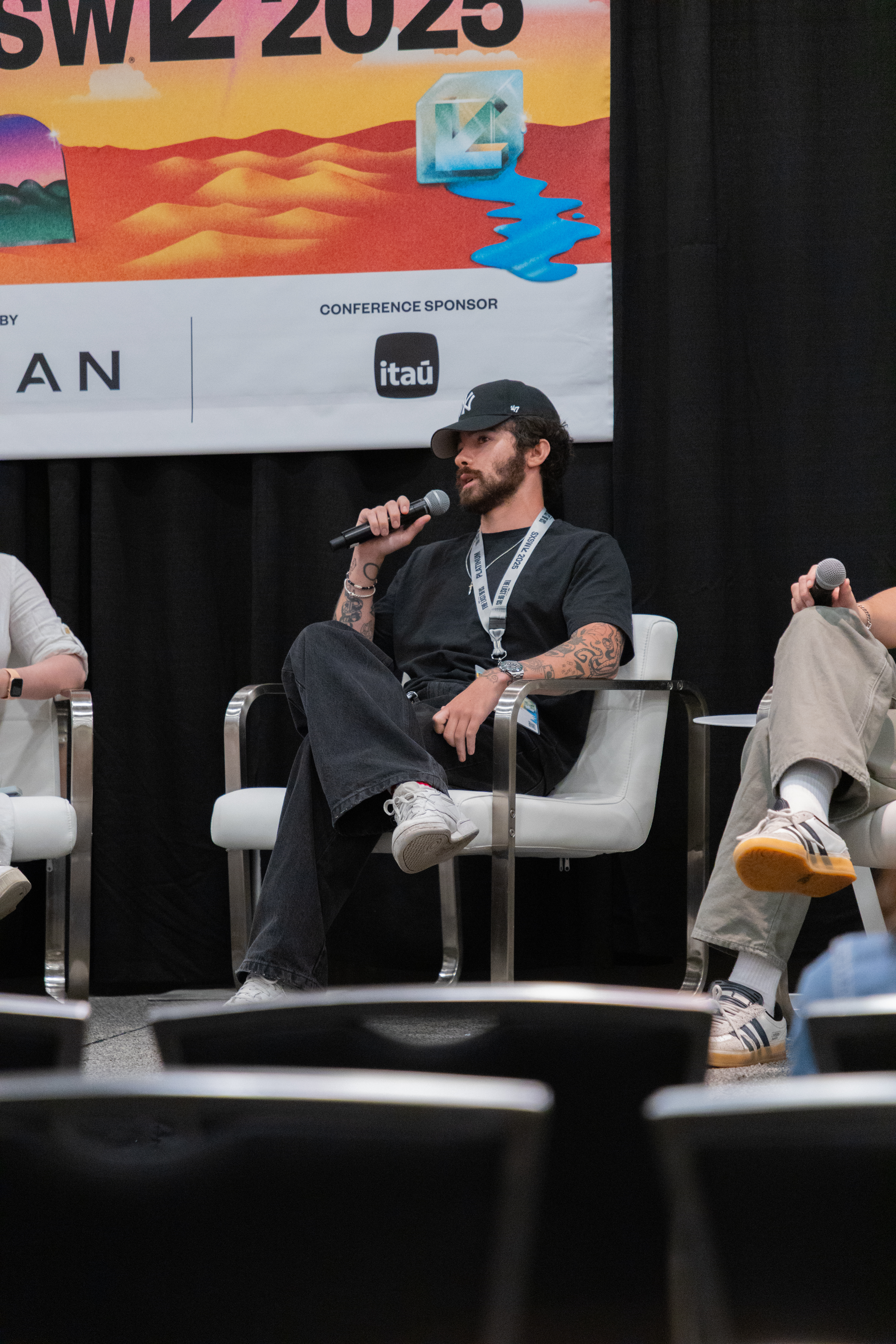
- Benz at South by Southwest 2025 in Austin, Texas
- Born: Andre Willem Benz; February 4, 1997 (age 29); New Jersey, United States
- Education: Menlo-Atherton High School
- Occupations: Entrepreneur, music executive
- Years active: 2012–present
- Known for: Trap Nation; Lowly; Broke Records

Andre Willem Benz (born February 4, 1997) is an American entrepreneur in the music and technology industries. He is the co-founder of YouTube music curation network The Nations and the founder of independent record labels Lowly and Broke Records.

== Early life and education ==
Benz was born in 1997, in New Jersey. He attended Menlo-Atherton High School in the San Francisco Bay Area, where he founded his first YouTube channel as a student. During high school, he was involved in athletics, swimming for a club and running track for his school.

== Career ==
Benz founded the YouTube channel Trap Nation in September 2012 at age 15. The channel focused on curating electronic trap music, a genre combining elements of Southern hip hop with electronic dance music.

By 2015, Trap Nation had accumulated nearly 800,000 subscribers. Benz subsequently expanded the concept into a multi-channel network called The Nations, launching additional genre-specific channels including Chill Nation (2014), Bass Nation and Rap Nation.

In 2016, Benz founded the independent record label initially named Lowly Palace, later rebranded as Lowly. The label was created to develop intellectual property and offer contracts with 50/50 profit splits and short-term licensing agreements to emerging artists featured on The Nations channels. The label initially focused on electronic music before expanding to other genres. Artists who have released music through Lowly include Said The Sky, Arrested Youth, Inzo and Greyson Chance. In July 2017, Billboard ranked Trap Nation as the top dance music curator on YouTube.

In April 2022, Create Music Group acquired a majority stake in The Nations and associated record label Lowly for an undisclosed amount.

Benz launched Broke Records in 2023 as his second independent label. The label focuses on digital marketing strategies, particularly on short-form video platforms such as TikTok. In 2024, Broke Records achieved over 15 Billboard-charting singles without major label backing. Broke Records grew from 25,000 to over 5.3 million daily streams within its first year, with marketing campaigns generating over 10 billion views across TikTok and Instagram.

In January 2025, companies associated with Andre Benz, including The Nation, LLC and Lowly Palace, LLC, were named as defendants in a federal copyright lawsuit filed by Artist Publishing Group (APG). A June 2025 court order dismissed the plaintiffs' claim for tortious interference with contractual relations. The parties subsequently reached a settlement, and the action was dismissed with prejudice in December 2025. The dismissal ended the litigation without a trial.

== Awards and recognition ==
He was featured in Forbes 30 Under 30 Music in 2024 and named a 2025 Noisemaker by Hits Daily Double. In 2026, Benz was named to Billboard's Dance/Electronic Power Players and Indie Power Players lists. Billboard named Andre Benz (CEO) and Brandon De Oliveira (COO), co-founders of Broke Records, to its 2025 Indie Power Players list. Benz has served as a speaker at music and technology conferences, including the Amsterdam Dance Event and South by Southwest (2025).
