= Until You're Satisfied =

Studio album by Yonaka
- Released: March 13, 2026
- Genres: Rock; alt rock; indie rock
- Length: 41:00
- Label: Distiller
- Producers: Alex Crosby; Dimitri Tikovoi

Yonaka chronology
Welcome to My House (2023)	Until You're Satisfied (2026)

Until You're Satisfied is the second album by English rock band Yonaka, released March 13, 2026. This is the band's first full-length album since their debut Don't Wait 'Til Tomorrow in 2019. It is also their first album since the departure of drummer Rob Mason in 2023, and their first as an independent artist.

== Background ==
After the release their 2023 EP Welcome to My House, Yonaka fell on hard times and had even considered breaking up, but the group, now a trio, remerged in 2025 with the release of a new single, "Problems", part of their upcoming LP, along with a music video. The music video for "Problems" was directed by Samuel Douek. The group then released a second single, "Cruel" along with the formal announcement of their second LP, Until You're Satisfied. In December of that year, the group released "Hit Me When I'm Sore", accompanied by a visualizer, created by Kane Hempson. The album was released on March 13, 2026.

== Composition and themes ==
The album was recorded at ICP Studio in Brussels. Guitarist, Alex Croby led the production of the album with input from Dimirtri Tikovoi. The lead single off the album "Problems" is a song about "when love starts to turn a little bit ugly" and was chosen to be the lead single for this reason. Jarvis states "Problems had to open up the album because this was the first song, when we wrote it, where we went 'Oh, this is what the album is going to be!'...". The song "Cruel" was inspired by Industrial rock and feature sexually charged lyrics. "Cruel" features a Bad Omens esq beat to 90s inspired bridge. "Hit Me When I'm Sore" is about front woman, Theresa Jarvis, ruminating about an ex partner, and how she was hurt by the relationship. The song "At The Beach" an Indie rock song about hope.

Jarvis states that she was inspired by Twenty One Pilots, Jeff Buckley and Amy Winehouse, when creating the album.

== Eurovision entry ==
The song "Cruel" was considered for entry in the Eurovision Song Contest according to bassist Alex Crosby. He states "... we flew out of London to audition for Eurovision with it." The group ultimately decided not to enter the song, with Theresa Jarvis stating "Loads of people were putting our names in... But that version had a different chorus, so I'm glad we didn't get in."

== Reception ==
Kerrang! magazine gave the album a 4-out-of-5 rating, stating that "the first half of the album is slightly stronger than the second, and there's a couple moments that don't quite land..." Kerrang describes "Do It for You" as one of the album's weak points. The review concluded by stating that fans of South Arcade, Vukovi, and The Hunna would enjoy the album.

Reading Indie Life gave the album 4 and a half stars out of 5. The magazine describes "Trouble Follows" as being reminisant of Portugal. The Man and "Best of Me" as being reminiscent of "Blood Run Warm" by South Arcade. They concluded by listing "Problems", "Cruel", "Miss Millenial", "Eat You Alive", "Trouble Follows", "At the Beach" and "Hit Me When I'm Sore" as the album's essential tracks.

== Track listing ==
All music is composed by Alex Crosby, George Edwards and Theresa Jarvis. Dimitri Tikovoi is an additional composer on tracks, 6, 9 and 13. Edwards is not listed as a composer on tracks 6 and 9. Rob Mason (Note: Although Mason is no longer part of the group, track 7, Best Of Me. was composed 5 years prior to the release of the album when Mason was still a member of the group) is an additional composer on track 7.

Until Your'e Satisfied track listing
No.	Title	Length
1.	"Intro"	1:17
2.	"Problems"	3:36
3.	"Cruel"	3:07
4.	"Miss Millenial"	2:56
5.	"Eat You Alive"	3:07
6.	"Trouble Follows"	3:29
7.	"Best of Me"	5:03
8.	"Say a Little While Longer"	3:27
9.	"At the Beach"	2:44
10.	"Do It for You"	3:31
11.	"Hit Me When I'm Soar"	2:55
12.	"Bite the Bullet"	2:50
13.	"Try"	3:40
Total length:		41:41
