= Kaitlin Aragon =

American singer

Kaitlin Aragon is an American singer. She is best known for being a featured vocalist on the re-released version of HAVEN's song "I Run".

== Early life ==
Aragon was born and raised in Phoenix, Arizona. She attended Grand Canyon University, where she majored in Pre-Law and graduated in 2020. As of 2026, she is based in Austin, Texas, where she is pursuing a career in music.

== Career ==
On October 17, 2025, Aragon released her first single, Good Love, with musicians DJ Ferno and Nyoki. Aragon was credited as Associated Performer, Lyricist, and Vocals.

=== "I Run" ===
In October 2025, British production duo HAVEN released their debut single "I Run", which did not originally feature Aragon. The song was an overnight viral sensation, reaching #11 of Spotify's US Charts with more than 13 million streams. "I Run" ran into controversy when allegations emerged that the producers of the song used AI Deepfaking of singer Jorja Smith's voice without her consent.

After the song was pulled from most streaming services due to copyright issues, a re-recorded version of the song featuring Kaitlin Aragon was released in November 2025. HAVEN discovered Aragon when she posted a TikTok video covering the song. While there was fan speculation that she was actually the original singer, this was later disproven.

As of May 2026, Aragon has more than eight million monthly Spotify listeners. Her ten most popular streamed songs are all variations of "I Run". In January 2026, David Guetta released a remix of Aragon's version of "I Run." Soon after, a music video for Guetta's remix was released, with Aragon heavily featured.
