= Barns Courtney =

English musician (born 1990)

- Born: Barnaby George Courtney; 17 November 1990 (age 35); Aylesbury, Buckinghamshire, England
- Genres: Alternative rock; indie rock; folk pop; blues rock
- Occupations: Singer; musician; songwriter
- Instruments: Vocals; guitar; piano
- Years active: 2015–present
- Labels: Virgin; Capitol; EMI; 300 Entertainment; Warner Brothers; Avenue A; Futures
- Formerly of: SleeperCell
- Website: BarnsCourtney.com

Barnaby George "Barns" Courtney (born 17 November 1990) is an English singer, musician, and songwriter.

== Early life ==
Courtney was born in England, then moved with his family to Seattle, Washington when he was 4. He returned to the United Kingdom when 15.

== Career ==
=== 2005–2015: early career ===
Barnaby Courtney formed his first band SleeperCell at the age of 15, with whom he won various battle of the bands competitions and then participated in Channel 4's Orange Unsigned, a national televised battle of the bands event

Courtney signed a record deal at the age of 19, as the frontman of indie band Dive Bella Dive with Island Records, developing the band's debut album in Los Angeles. However, issues with the producer, Red One, stalled their project and, bound by contractual obligations, Courtney and his band were unable to re-record the material.

Despite touring and recording multiple albums, none could be released due to the band's contractual ties to Red One. It was only when Red One terminated their contract that Courtney could approach a new producer with his composition "Fire" which became his breakout single.

The track "Fire" gained unexpected traction after being used in the Bradley Cooper movie Burnt, which enabled Courtney to quit his retail job and sign a deal with Virgin Records.

=== 2015–2016: beginnings as a solo artist ===
In 2015, Courtney released his first track as a solo artist, "Glitter & Gold", which received radio play on BBC Introducing Suffolk and by BBC Radio 1's Phil Taggert, and led to an appearance at Radio 1's Big Weekend in Exeter the following year. "Glitter & Gold" also reached No. 1 on the UK Spotify Viral Chart, and No. 2 on the iTunes Alternative Chart.

Also in 2015, "Fire" was featured in the Bradley Cooper movie Burnt and went on to receive airplay on American rock radio in 2016. To date, "Fire" has been streamed more than 150 million times on Spotify, while "Glitter & Gold" has been streamed more than 230 million times. Courtney played at the SXSW Music Festival in Austin, Texas, in a showcase for NME magazine in March 2016 and performed "Fire" on Conan O'Brien's TBS talkshow Conan in June. In early 2017, the It's All Indie website selected Courtney as its No. 1 Sound of 2017.

Courtney has opened for artists including The Who, The Libertines, Ed Sheeran, The Lumineers, Tom Odell and Fitz and the Tantrums, and opened for Blur at the closing party for the 2016 Abu Dhabi Grand Prix. In 2016–2017, while working on his first full-length album, he performed at the BottleRock Napa Valley festival in California, the Governors Ball Music Festival in New York and the LaureLive Music Festival in Cleveland, OH later in 2017.

In 2016, Barns Courtney played at the Rock Werchter festival in Belgium on the KlubC stage.

=== 2016–present: The Attractions of Youth, 404, and Supernatural ===
In late January 2016, he also announced details of an extensive US headlining tour, in addition to the release of his debut EP, The Dull Drums. His song, "Hellfire", was named as the official theme song for Extreme Rules in 2017.

On 29 September, he released his debut studio album The Attractions of Youth. It charted at number eight on US Heat, and at 95 on the UK Sales charts.

On 6 September, 2019, his second album, 404, was released. It features the hit song "99".

On March 30, 2024, he released the song VILLAIN (TAKE THE SHOT) in collaboration with ARB4 and Eytan Peled as an anthem for the Valorant Champions Tour (EMEA region)

On July 19, 2024, he released his third studio album, Supernatural.

== Discography ==
=== Studio albums ===
Title	Details	Peak chart positions			
Title	Details	UK Sales	SCO	US Heat	US Sales
The Attractions of Youth	Released: 29 September 2017; Label: Virgin EMI, Universal	95	82	8	—
404	Released: 6 September 2019; Label: Virgin EMI, Universal	51	55	3	69
Supernatural	Released: 19 July 2024; Label: Avenue A Records	—	—		
"—" denotes a recording that did not chart or was not released in that territory.

=== EPs ===
Title	Year
The Dull Drums	2017
It's Hard To Be Alone	2020

=== Singles ===
Title	Year	Peak chart positions								Certifications	Album
Title	Year	UK Sales	BEL (FL) Tip	CAN Rock	FRA	SCO	US AAA	US Alt.	US Rock	Certifications	Album
"Fire"	2016	—	—	20	—	—	3	18	46	MC: Gold	The Attractions of Youth
"Glitter & Gold"	2016	59	—	—	60	49	—	— (Note: "Glitter & Gold" did not enter the Billboard Alternative Airplay Songs chart, but peaked at number 10 on the Alternative Digital chart.)	38	BPI: Silver; MC: Gold; RIAA: Gold	The Attractions of Youth
"Hands"	2016	—	—	—	—	—	—	—	—		The Attractions of Youth
"Golden Dandelions"	2017	—	—	—	—	—	—	19	— (Note: "Golden Dandelions" did not enter the Billboard Hot Rock & Alternative Songs chart, but peaked at number 33 on the Rock & Alternative Airplay chart.)		The Attractions of Youth
"Never Let You Down"	2017	—	—	—	—	—	—	—	—		The Attractions of Youth
"Kicks"	2017	—	—	—	—	—	—	—	—		The Attractions of Youth
"Champion"	2017	—	—	—	—	—	—	—	—		The Attractions of Youth
"Sinners"	2018	—	—	—	—	—	—	—	—		Non-album single
"99"	2018	—	—	3	—	—	12	7	19	MC: Gold	404
"You and I"	2019	—	40	47	—	—	—	27	—		404
"Hollow"	2019	—	— (Note: "Hollow" did not enter the Flanders Ultratop 50, but charted as an extra tip on the Flemish Ultratip chart.)	—	—	—	—	—	—		404
"Hard to Be Alone"	2020	—	—	—	—	—	—	—	—		Non-album single
"Supernatural"	2022	—	—	11	—	—	28	27	—		Supernatural
"Golden"	2023	—	—	30	—	—	—	—	—		Supernatural
"Young in America"	2023	—	—	—	—	—	—	21	—		Supernatural
"Mother Teresa"	2024	—	—	—	—	—	—	—	—		Non-album single
"—" denotes a recording that did not chart or was not released in that territory.

=== Other appearances ===
Title	Year	Band	Album
"1979"	2026	The Smashing Pumpkins	Sending Hearts To All My Dearies: A Tribute To The Smashing Pumpkins

== Filmography ==
Year	Title	Role	Episode
2016	Conan	Himself – Musical guest	Season 6, Episode 95
2017	The Late Late Show with James Corden	Himself – Musical guest	Season 4, Episode 16
2017	Sunday Brunch	Himself – Guest	Series 6, Episode 44
2018	Last Call with Carson Daly	Himself – Musical guest	Season 17, Episode 26
2018	Last Call with Carson Daly	Himself – Musical guest	Season 17, Episode 39
2019	Sunday Brunch	Himself – Guest	Series 8, Episode 26
