= Talk to You (Anotr song) =

2026 single by Anotr featuring 54 Ultra

Single by Anotr featuring 54 Ultra

from the album Withness
- Released: 6 March 2026
- Studio: Upstate New York, United States
- Genre: Disco house
- Length: 3:11
- Label: No Art
- Composers: Hank Korsan; Jackson Shanks; Jesse van der Heijden; John Anthony Rodriguez; Oguzhan Guney; Spilly Cave
- Lyricists: Jackson Shanks; Jesse van der Heijden; John Anthony Rodriguez; Oguzhan Guney; Spilly Cave
- Producers: Anotr; Hank Korsan; Jackson Shanks

Anotr singles chronology
| "Sound of You" (2025) | "Talk to You" (2026) | "Like It" (2026) |

54 Ultra singles chronology
| "Find Your Love" (2025) | "Talk to You" (2026) | "Turnaround" (2026) |

"Talk to You" is a song by Dutch electronic music duo Anotr featuring New Jersey-based singer and songwriter 54 Ultra, released by the duo's own label No Art on 6 March 2026.

The song was written by the duo, composed of Jesse van der Heijden and Oguzhan Guney, Jackson Shanks, 54 Ultra (John Anthony Rodriguez), Spilly Cave, and Hank Korsan, with the latter only credited as composer. The production consists of Anotr, Korsan and Shanks.

Written in a studio in Upstate New York, the track has been qualified as disco house. It reached the number one position on the World Airplay Radio Monitor (WARM) Global Dance Radio chart in April 2026.

== Background and release ==
"Talk to You" was released via the duo's own label, No Art, and written in a studio in Upstate New York during one of their retreats. The duo invited the singer and songwriter John Rodriguez, known professionally as 54 Ultra, who is credited as a featured artist on the track. The release comes after Anotr's third studio album, On a Trip, which was released in 2025.

== Reception ==
"Talk to You" was described as warm and funky, incorporating "funk guitar riffs", "syncopated synth stabs" and "reverb-soaked vocals". Some similarities with the duo's 2022 single "Relax My Eyes" have been noted, including a "same melancholy vocal sound" but with a "slower" and "more relaxed" side.

== Commercial performance ==
The song topped the World Airplay Radio Monitor (WARM) Global Dance Radio chart dated 11 April 2026, based on airplay data from dance stations across more than 30 countries. Debuting at number seven two weeks earlier, the track reached the number one position on the chart thanks to approximately 800 plays during the tracking week of 27 March to 2 April 2026. It has also gained popularity on TikTok, where it has been used in more than 50,000 videos as reported on 14 April 2026.

In the United Kingdom, the song became the duo's first to reach the top 40 of the UK singles chart.

In the United States, "Talk to You" debuted and peaked at number five on the Billboard Hot Dance/Electronic Songs, with 1.5 million streams, marking the duo's highest charting single.

== Charts ==
=== Weekly charts ===
Weekly chart performance for "Talk to You"
| Chart (2026) | Peak position |
|---|---|
| Argentina Anglo Airplay (Monitor Latino) | 15 |
| Australia (ARIA) | 76 |
| Australia Club Tracks (ARIA) | 7 |
| Austria (Ö3 Austria Top 40) | 21 |
| Austria Airplay (MusicTrace) | 30 |
| Belarus Airplay (TopHit) | 44 |
| Belgium (Ultratop 50 Flanders) | 3 |
| Belgium (Ultratop 50 Wallonia) | 5 |
| Canada Hot 100 (Billboard) | 86 |
| Chile Anglo Airplay (Monitor Latino) | 12 |
| Colombia Anglo Airplay (Monitor Latino) | 18 |
| CIS Airplay (TopHit) | 3 |
| Croatia (Billboard) | 19 |
| Croatia International Airplay (Top lista) | 5 |
| Ecuador Anglo Airplay (Monitor Latino) | 10 |
| Estonia Airplay (TopHit) | 9 |
| Finland Airplay (Radiosoittolista) | 81 |
| France Airplay (SNEP) | 37 |
| Germany (GfK) | 24 |
| Germany Airplay (MusicTrace) | 28 |
| Germany Dance (GfK) | 3 |
| Global 200 (Billboard) | 59 |
| Global Dance Radio (Billboard/WARM) | 1 |
| Greece International (IFPI) | 4 |
| Honduras Anglo Airplay (Monitor Latino) | 7 |
| Hungary (Dance Top 40) | 1 |
| Hungary (Editors' Choice Top 40) | 12 |
| Ireland (IRMA) | 8 |
| Italy (FIMI) | 13 |
| Italy Airplay (EarOne) | 5 |
| Latin America Anglo Airplay (Monitor Latino) | 19 |
| Latvia Airplay (LaIPA) | 2 |
| Latvia Airplay (TopHit) | 1 |
| Latvia Streaming (LaIPA) | 20 |
| Lebanon (Lebanese Top 20) | 3 |
| Lithuania (AGATA) | 19 |
| Lithuania Airplay (TopHit) | 2 |
| Luxembourg (Billboard) | 9 |
| Malta Airplay (Radiomonitor) | 5 |
| Moldova Airplay (TopHit) | 7 |
| Netherlands (Dutch Top 40) | 2 |
| Netherlands (Single Top 100) | 5 |
| New Zealand Hot Singles (RMNZ) | 15 |
| North Macedonia Airplay (Radiomonitor) | 1 |
| Norway (VG-lista) | 40 |
| Norway Airplay (IFPI) | 96 |
| Paraguay Anglo Airplay (Monitor Latino) | 7 |
| Poland Airplay (OLiS) | 5 |
| Poland Streaming (OLiS) | 49 |
| Portugal (AFP) | 85 |
| Puerto Rico Anglo Airplay (Monitor Latino) | 13 |
| Romania Airplay (Media Forest) | 9 |
| Russia Airplay (TopHit) | 5 |
| San Marino Airplay (SMRTV Top 50) | 4 |
| Serbia Airplay (Radiomonitor) | 2 |
| Slovakia Singles Digital (ČNS IFPI) | 61 |
| Slovenia Airplay (Radiomonitor) | 10 |
| Sweden (Sverigetopplistan) | 57 |
| Sweden Dance (Sverigetopplistan) | 3 |
| Switzerland (Schweizer Hitparade) | 7 |
| Ukraine Airplay (TopHit) | 9 |
| UK Singles (Official Charts) | 3 |
| UK Dance (Official Charts) | 1 |
| UK Independent (Official Charts) | 1 |
| Uruguay Anglo Airplay (Monitor Latino) | 5 |
| US Dance Airplay (Billboard) | 8 |
| US Hot Dance/Electronic Songs (Billboard) | 4 |
| Venezuela Anglo Airplay (Monitor Latino) | 8 |

=== Monthly charts ===
Monthly chart performance for "Talk to You"
| Chart (2026) | Peak position |
|---|---|
| Belarus Airplay (TopHit) | 80 |
| CIS Airplay (TopHit) | 3 |
| Estonia Airplay (TopHit) | 11 |
| Latvia Airplay (TopHit) | 3 |
| Lithuania Airplay (TopHit) | 3 |
| Moldova Airplay (TopHit) | 8 |
| Romania Airplay (TopHit) | 13 |
| Russia Airplay (TopHit) | 6 |
| Ukraine Airplay (TopHit) | 22 |

== Certifications ==
Certifications for "Talk to You"
| Region | Certification | Certified units/sales |
|---|---|---|
| Italy (FIMI) | Gold | 100,000^{‡} |
| United Kingdom (BPI) | Gold | 400,000^{‡} |
Streaming
| Greece (IFPI Greece) | Platinum | 2,000,000^{†} |
^{‡} Sales+streaming figures based on certification alone.^{†} Streaming-only figures based on certification alone.

== Release history ==
Release dates and formats for "Talk to You"
| Region | Date | Format | Label | Ref. |
|---|---|---|---|---|
| Various | 6 March 2026 | Digital download; streaming | No Art | |
| Italy | 20 March 2026 | Radio airplay | No Art | |
| United Kingdom | 20 March 2026 | Contemporary hit radio | No Art | |
