= List of UK Rock & Metal Singles Chart number ones of 2026 =

The UK Rock & Metal Singles Chart is a record chart which ranks the best-selling rock and heavy metal songs in the United Kingdom. Compiled and published by the Official Charts Company, the data is based on each track's weekly physical sales and digital downloads. The first number one of the year was "Iris" by Goo Goo Dolls.

== Chart history ==
Issue date	Single	Artist	Record label	Ref.
2 January	"Iris"	Goo Goo Dolls	Warner	
9 January	"Iris"	Goo Goo Dolls	Warner	
16 January	"Iris"	Goo Goo Dolls	Warner	
23 January	"Iris"	Goo Goo Dolls	Warner	
30 January	"Iris"	Goo Goo Dolls	Warner	
6 February	"Iris"	Goo Goo Dolls	Warner	
13 February	"Iris"	Goo Goo Dolls	Warner	
20 February	"Iris"	Goo Goo Dolls	Warner	
27 February	"Iris"	Goo Goo Dolls	Warner	
6 March	"Iris"	Goo Goo Dolls	Warner	
13 March	"Iris"	Goo Goo Dolls	Warner	
20 March	"Iris"	Goo Goo Dolls	Warner	
27 March	"Iris"	Goo Goo Dolls	Warner	
3 April	"Iris"	Goo Goo Dolls	Warner	
10 April	"Iris"	Goo Goo Dolls	Warner	
17 April	"Iris"	Goo Goo Dolls	Warner	
24 April	"Iris"	Goo Goo Dolls	Warner	
1 May	"Iris"	Goo Goo Dolls	Warner	
8 May	"Iris"	Goo Goo Dolls	Warner	
15 May	"Iris"	Goo Goo Dolls	Warner	
22 May	"Iris"	Goo Goo Dolls	Warner	
29 May	"Iris"	Goo Goo Dolls	Warner	
5 June	"Iris"	Goo Goo Dolls	Warner	
12 June	"Iris"	Goo Goo Dolls	Warner	
19 June	"Iris"	Goo Goo Dolls	Warner	
26 June	"Iris"	Goo Goo Dolls	Warner	
3 July	"Iris"	Goo Goo Dolls	Warner	
10 July	"Iris"	Goo Goo Dolls	Warner	
17 July	"Iris"	Goo Goo Dolls	Warner	
24 July	"Iris"	Goo Goo Dolls	Warner	
31 July	"Iris"	Goo Goo Dolls	Warner	
7 August	"Iris"	Goo Goo Dolls	Warner	
14 August	"Iris"	Goo Goo Dolls	Warner	
21 August	"Iris"	Goo Goo Dolls	Warner	
28 August	"Iris"	Goo Goo Dolls	Warner	
4 September	"Iris"	Goo Goo Dolls	Warner	
11 September	"Iris"	Goo Goo Dolls	Warner	
18 September	"Iris"	Goo Goo Dolls	Warner	
25 September	"Iris"	Goo Goo Dolls	Warner	
2 October	"Iris"	Goo Goo Dolls	Warner	
9 October	"Iris"	Goo Goo Dolls	Warner	
16 October	"Iris"	Goo Goo Dolls	Warner	
23 October	"Iris"	Goo Goo Dolls	Warner	
30 October	"Iris"	Goo Goo Dolls	Warner	
6 November	"Iris"	Goo Goo Dolls	Warner	
13 November	"Iris"	Goo Goo Dolls	Warner	
20 November	"Iris"	Goo Goo Dolls	Warner	

== See also ==
- List of UK Rock & Metal Albums Chart number ones of 2026
