= Embrace It =

Single by Ndotz
- Released: 23 August 2024
- Length: 1:44
- Label: Isekai
- Songwriter: Ngueza Nihadi Eduard De Almeida Cardoso
- Producer: RJ Pasin

Ndotz singles chronology
| "Let's Bill It" (2024) | "Embrace It" (2024) | "Crack Dat" (2024) |

Remix cover
- Sexyy Red and Flo Milli remix cover

Sexyy Red singles chronology
| "Sticky" (2024) | "Embrace It" (Remix) (2024) | "Fat Juicy & Wet" (2024) |

Flo Milli singles chronology
| "Why Lie?" (2024) | "Embrace It" (Remix) (2024) | "Dirty Work" (2024) |

Music videos
- "Embrace It" on YouTube
- "Embrace It" (Remix) on YouTube

"Embrace It" is a song by British rapper Ndotz. It was released on 23 August 2024 through Isekai Records.

The song became a viral TikTok hit, reaching the top 40 in Austria, Hungary, Ireland, Lithuania, the Netherlands, New Zealand, Switzerland and the United Kingdom.

A remix version of "Embrace It" was released on 6 December 2024, featuring American rappers Sexyy Red and Flo Milli.

== Usage in media ==
"Embrace It" was featured in the NBA 2K26 soundtrack.

== Charts ==
Chart performance for "Embrace It"
| Chart (2024) | Peak position |
|---|---|
| Australia (ARIA) | 46 |
| Australia Hip Hop/R&B (ARIA) | 6 |
| Austria (Ö3 Austria Top 40) | 23 |
| Belgium (Ultratop 50 Flanders) | 48 |
| Canada (Canadian Hot 100) | 51 |
| Czech Republic Singles Digital (ČNS IFPI) | 25 |
| Global 200 (Billboard) | 59 |
| Greece International (IFPI) | 22 |
| Hungary (Single Top 40) | 38 |
| Ireland (IRMA) | 28 |
| Israel (Mako Hitlist) | 86 |
| Italy (FIMI) | 83 |
| Latvia Streaming (LAIPA) | 12 |
| Lithuania (AGATA) | 9 |
| Luxembourg (Billboard) | 17 |
| Netherlands (Single Top 100) | 24 |
| New Zealand (Recorded Music NZ) | 30 |
| Poland (Polish Streaming Top 100) | 50 |
| Portugal (AFP) | 83 |
| Slovakia Singles Digital (ČNS IFPI) | 14 |
| Sweden (Sverigetopplistan) | 79 |
| Switzerland (Schweizer Hitparade) | 19 |
| UK Singles (Official Charts) | 20 |
| UK Indie (Official Charts) | 4 |
| UK Hip Hop/R&B (Official Charts) | 1 |
| US Bubbling Under Hot 100 (Billboard) | 25 |

== Certifications ==
| Region | Certification | Certified units/sales |
|---|---|---|
| United Kingdom (BPI) | Silver | 200,000^{‡} |
^{‡} Sales+streaming figures based on certification alone.
