= List of UK Independent Albums Chart number ones of 2026 =

These are the Official Charts Company's UK Independent Albums Chart number ones of 2026.

== Chart history ==
Issue date	Album	Artist(s)	Record label	Ref.
2 January	AM	Arctic Monkeys	Domino	
9 January	AM	Arctic Monkeys	Domino	
16 January	Reflections	Blue	Cooking Vinyl	
23 January	The Demise of Planet X	Sleaford Mods	Rough Trade	
30 January ^{[a]}	How Did I Get Here?	Louis Tomlinson	BMG	
6 February	West End Girl	Lily Allen	BMG	
13 February	Clair Obscur - Expedition 33 Ost	Lorien Testard	Laced	
20 February	Tension Tour - Live 2025	Kylie Minogue	BMG	
27 February	My Ego Told Me To	Leigh-Anne	Made in the 90s	
6 March ^{[a]}	The Mountain	Gorillaz	Kong	
13 March	Trixies	Squeeze	BMG	
20 March	Trying Times	James Blake	Good Boy Records	
27 March	Living the Dream	Jane McDonald	Jeanie Productions	
3 April ^{[a]} ^{[b]}	This Music May Contain Hope	Raye	Human Re Sources	
10 April	Ambiguous Desire	Arlo Parks	Transgressive	
17 April	We Will Always Be the Way We Were	Jack Savoretti	Lanza	
24 April ^{[a]}	You Got This	Skindred	Earache	
1 May	The Mocking Stars	Lausse the Cat	Velvet Blues	
8 May	Fenian	Kneecap	Heavenly	
15 May	Is This How Happiness Feels?	Reverend and the Makers	Distiller	
22 May	Cruel Intentions	Karma Effect	Earache	
29 May	Glow	Michael Ball	Tag8	
5 June	Inferno	Boards of Canada	Warp	
12 June	Elsewhere Always	Overpass	Communion	
19 June	Avalanche	Embrace	Cooking Vinyl	
26 June	Re-Created	Placebo	Elevator Lady	
3 July	The Ground Above	Beth Orton	Partisan	
10 July	Splat!	Deep Purple	EarMusic	
17 July	Frozen Charlotte	Jack White	Third Man	
24 July	As It Is	As It Is	FLG	
31 July	Lost Tapes	Nines	Empire/Zino	
7 August	Renascent	The Durutti Column	London Recordings	
14 August ^{[a]}	A Love Letter to a Broken Town	The Reytons	The Reytons	
21 August ^{[a]}	Lost Weekend	Phoebe Bridgers	Dead Oceans	
28 August	What Are the Odds	Jorja Smith	FAMM	
4 September	God Bless the Band	Courteeners	Ignition	
11 September	Running Round the Sun	Jamie Webster	Modern Sky	
18 September ^{[a]}	Here Because of Hope	Ezra Collective	Partisan	
25 September	Apples for Isaac	Echo & the Bunnymen	BMG	
2 October	Danceteria	Soft Cell	Soft Cell Music	
9 October ^{[a]}	Songs from the Wedding Cake	Blossoms	Distiller	
16 October	New Promise Land Incorporated	The Temperance Movement	Earache	
23 October ^{[a]} ^{[b]}	Dopamine Chamber	Fontaines D.C.	XL	
30 October	From the Dark	Tony Iommi	BMG	
6 November ^{[a]}	Perfecth	Queens of the Stone Age	Matador	
13 November	Requiem for a Village	Steven Wilson	Fiction	
20 November	Alamo	Jake Bugg	Lovebugg	

== Notes ==
- ^{a} – The single was simultaneously number-one on the Album chart.
- ^{b} - The artist was simultaneously number one on the Independent Singles Chart.
