= 54 Ultra =

American musician (born 2000)

- Born: John Anthony Rodriguez; 2000 (age 25–26); Hackensack, New Jersey
- Genres: Latin soul; indie pop; indie rock
- Years active: 2020–present
- Label: Interscope
- Website: www.54ultra.com

John Anthony "Johnny" Rodriguez (born 2000), also known as 54 Ultra, is an American musician. Known for his smooth, Latin soul-influenced vocals, he first gained popularity in 2023 with his single "Where Are You?" and released his debut EP, First Works, in 2025. In 2026, he featured on the viral song "Talk To You" by Anotr and signed with Interscope Records. He is set to release his debut album in fall 2026.

== Early life ==
John Anthony Rodriguez was born in 2000, in Hackensack, New Jersey, to a Puerto Rican father and Dominican mother, and grew up in the New Jersey communities of Passaic, Paterson and Sparta; after graduating from Sparta High School, he attended County College of Morris. His mother was very interested in music and frequently attended bachata and merengue concerts. He got into music when he was fifteen, originally making rap beats before learning guitar and piano during his time in high school and community college, where he learned audio engineering. His beats in high school led to him achieving small regional fame in North Jersey. Rodriguez had also sung in a salsa band for over a year.

== Career ==
In 2019, Rodriguez was hired at a recording studio after interning for them. He began learning how to sing and write songs and started producing R&B music, inspired by Brent Faiyaz, and writing for other musicians such as RetcH, Fetty Wap, and Kali Uchis. During the COVID-19 pandemic, Rodriguez was unable to work at the studio, so he recorded his songs that were originally meant for other musicians, making them public. He ended up enjoying the process and continued creating music. At this time, he began listening to '70s and '80s artists such as Donnie and Joe Emerson, which influenced his sound.

In June 2023, Rodriguez released the single "Where Are You?", which was his first song to have a Latin sound. The track triples his monthly listener count on Spotify and led him to begin working with producer Max Shrager. They subsequently recorded the singles "Heaven Knows" and "What More Can I Do" together. On May 30, 2025, Rodriguez released his first project, the EP First Works. It was recognized by Billboard as one of the "Best Projects of the Year (So Far)." In March 2026, Rodriguez's vocals and guitar-playing were featured on the disco track "Talk To You" by Dutch electronic music duo Anotr. After going viral on TikTok, the song reached number one on the World Airplay Radio Monitor (WARM) Global Dance Radio Chart and peaked at number five Billboard Hot Dance/Electronic Songs chart. In April, Rodriguez signed with Interscope Records and made his debut at Coachella 2026 music festival. He is set to release his debut studio album in fall 2026.

== Influences and artistry ==
Rodriguez's music has been described as Latin soul, indie pop, and indie rock, combining smooth vocals and vintage production. Rodriguez, who sings in both English and Spanish, was inspired by other New York City-based Latin musicians such as Joe Bataan, Ralfi Pagan, Héctor Lavoe, and the Fania All-Stars in addition to contemporary artists including Mac DeMarco, Beach House, Dev Hynes, Kali Uchis, and Steve Lacy. He uses many salsa and bolero vocal arrangements in his music, such as call-and-response and vocal layering in addition to pulling from rare soul artists such as Donnie and Joe Emerson. On his debut EP, First Works, he combined new wave music influenced by George Michael and Robert Smith with his R&B influences. His stage name, "54 Ultra", comes from a combination of the disco club Studio 54 in New York City and Frank Ocean's 2011 mixtape Nostalgia, Ultra. Rodriguez is also known for his vintage, '70s-inspired style of dress, which he wears day-to-day, even when not performing. His fashion was inspired by that of Michael Jackson, Fleetwood Mac, and Heatwave. He is also into vintage watch collecting.

== Discography ==
=== Extended plays ===
Title	Details
First Works	Released: May 30, 2025; Label: Self-released; Formats: LP, CD, cassette, digital download

=== Singles ===
Title	Year	Album
"Ultra Violet"	2020	Non-album singles
"Should I Let This Go?"	2021	Non-album singles
"YWMFM / Sunday"	2021	Non-album singles
"Sierra"	2022	Non-album singles
"Just Like You"	2023	Non-album singles
"Where Are You"	2023	Non-album singles
"Heaven Knows"	2024	Non-album singles
"What More Can I Do"	2024	Non-album singles
"Talk 2 Me"	2025	First Works
"Upside Down"	2025	First Works
"No Tengo Valor"	2025	First Works
"I Won't Go"	2025	Non-album singles
"Find Your Love"	2025	Non-album singles
"Turnaround / I'm Hooked"	2026	Non-album singles
"Talk To You (54's Version)"	2026	Non-album singles
"Tell Me"	2026	Non-album singles
"Honeymoon"	2026	Non-album singles
