= List of UK top-ten singles in 2026 =

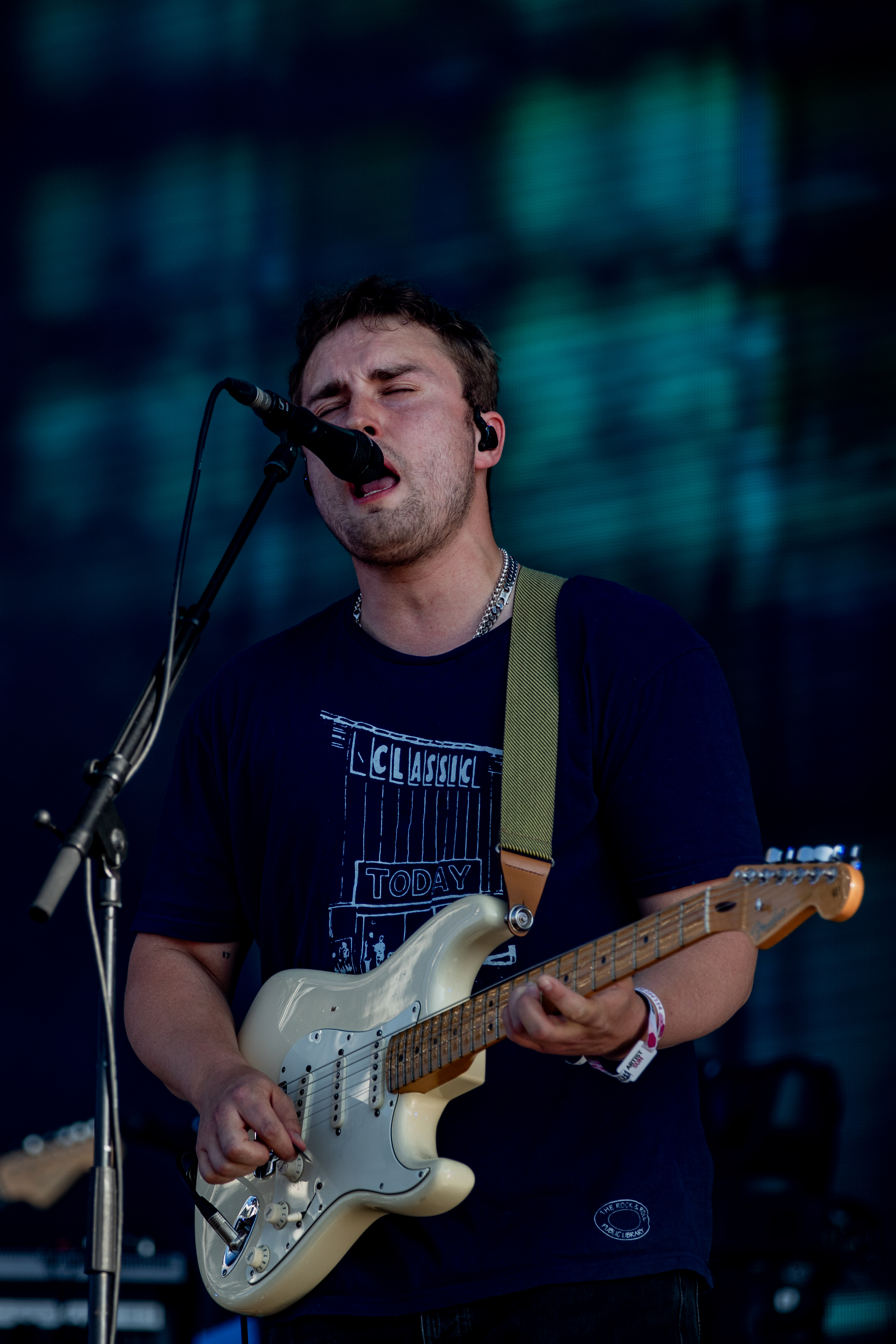
Sam Fender achieved his first UK number-one single in February 2026 with "Rein Me In", a duet with Olivia Dean, which spent 35 consecutive weeks in the top 40 before reaching the summit, the most for any single in UK chart history. It stayed at number-one for 23 non-consecutive weeks, becoming the longest-running UK number-one single of all time.

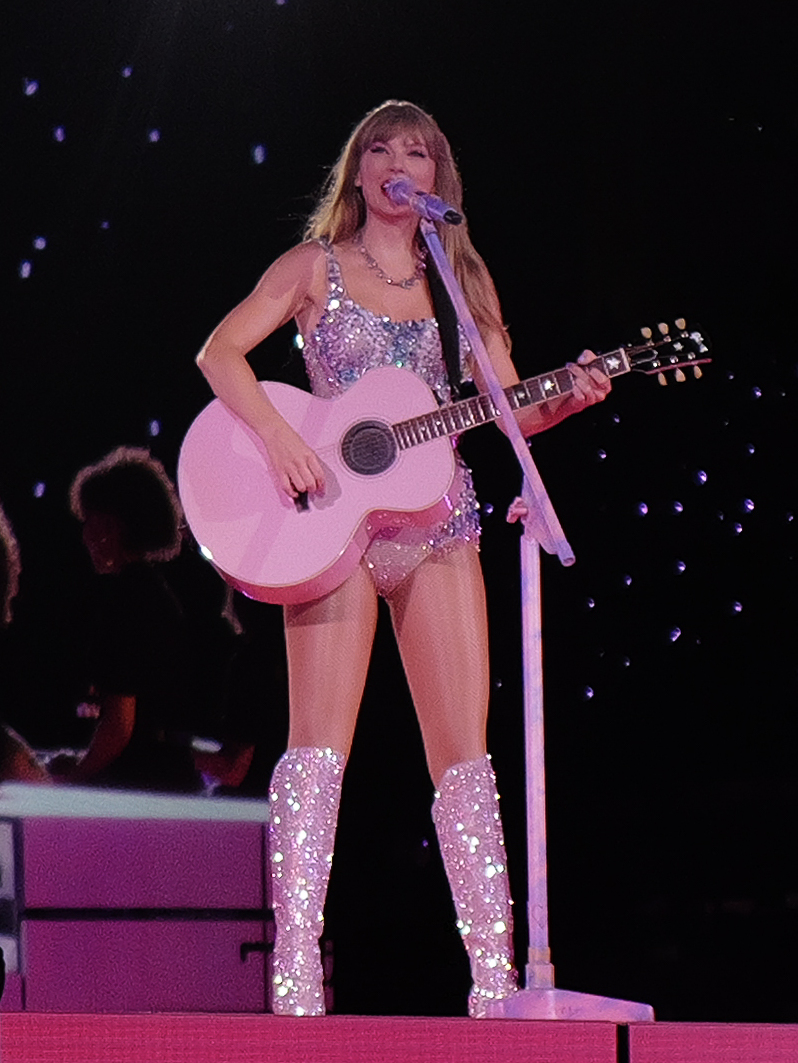
Taylor Swift earned six top 10 singles this year, three of which reached number-one: "Opalite" (which first charted in the top 10 in October 2025), "I Knew It, I Knew You", from the Toy Story 5 soundtrack, and "Patient Zero".

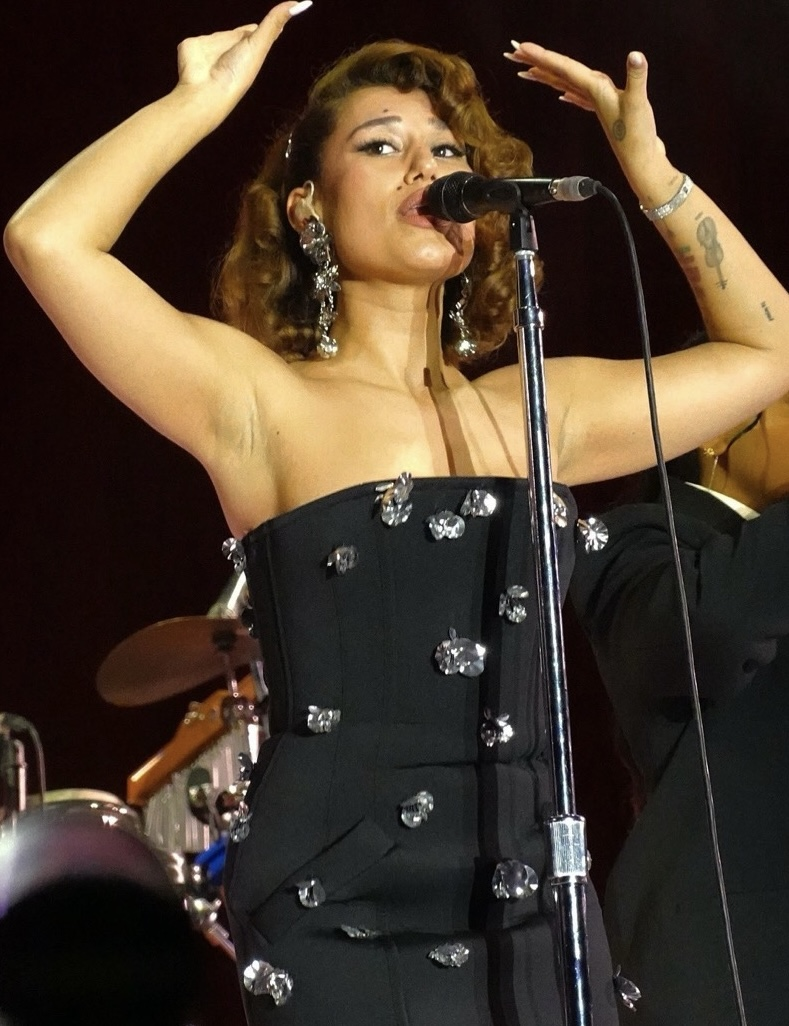
Raye earned her second UK number-one single in January 2026 with "Where Is My Husband!", which first entered the chart in the top 10 in late 2025.

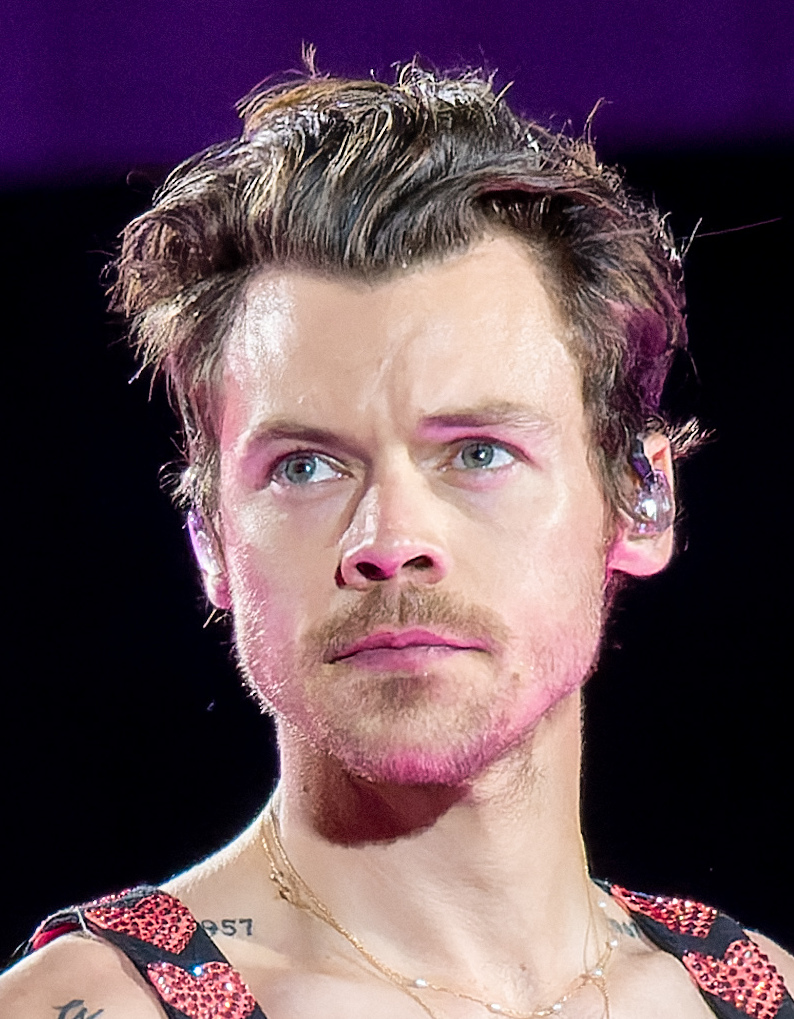
Harry Styles also had a pretty successful year, securing three top 10 singles, with "Aperture" and "American Girls" both reaching number-one.

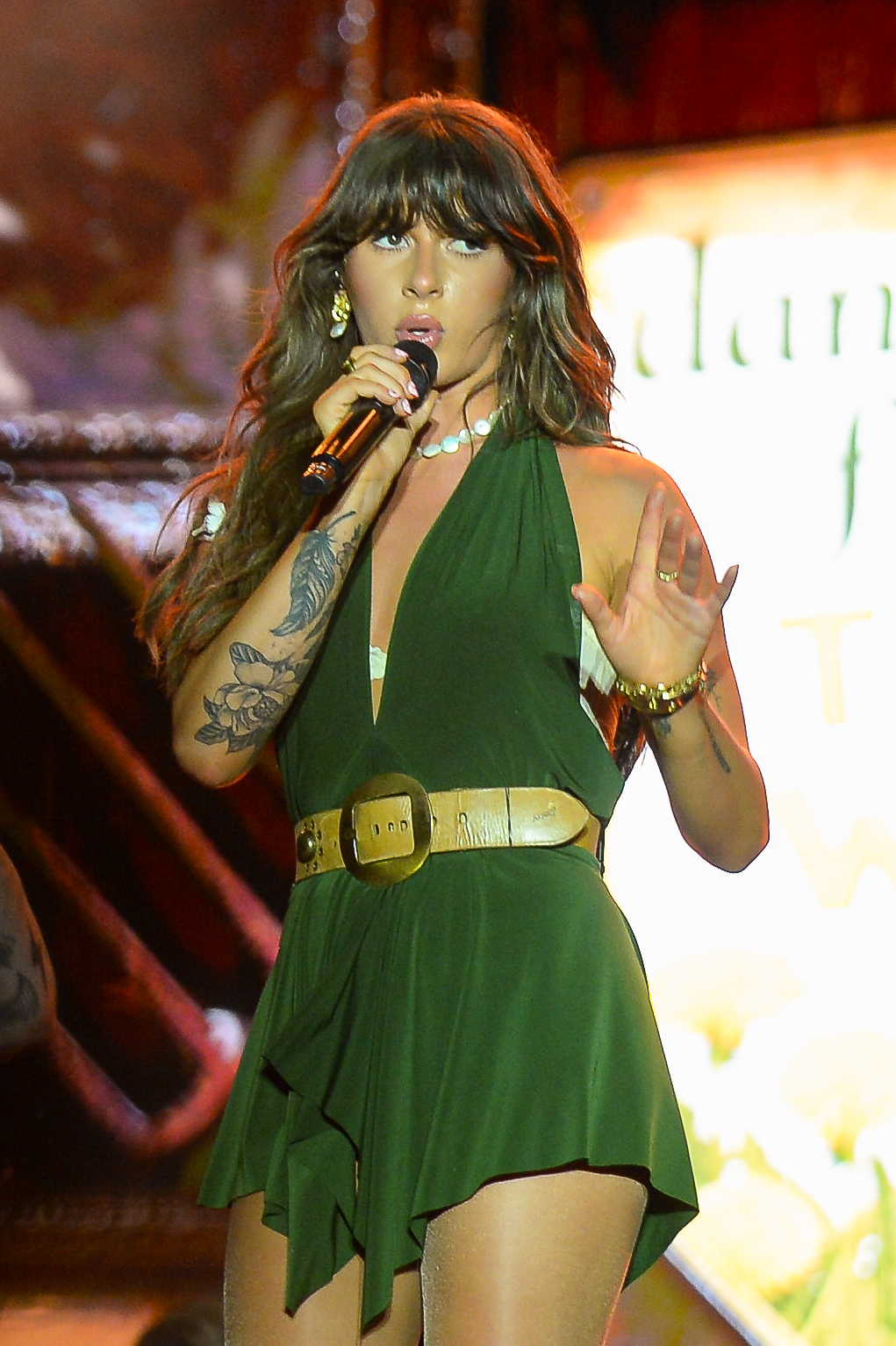
Country music singer Ella Langley achieved her breakthrough UK hit in 2026 with "Choosin' Texas", which finally topped the chart in September after spending 11 consecutive weeks in the top 10.

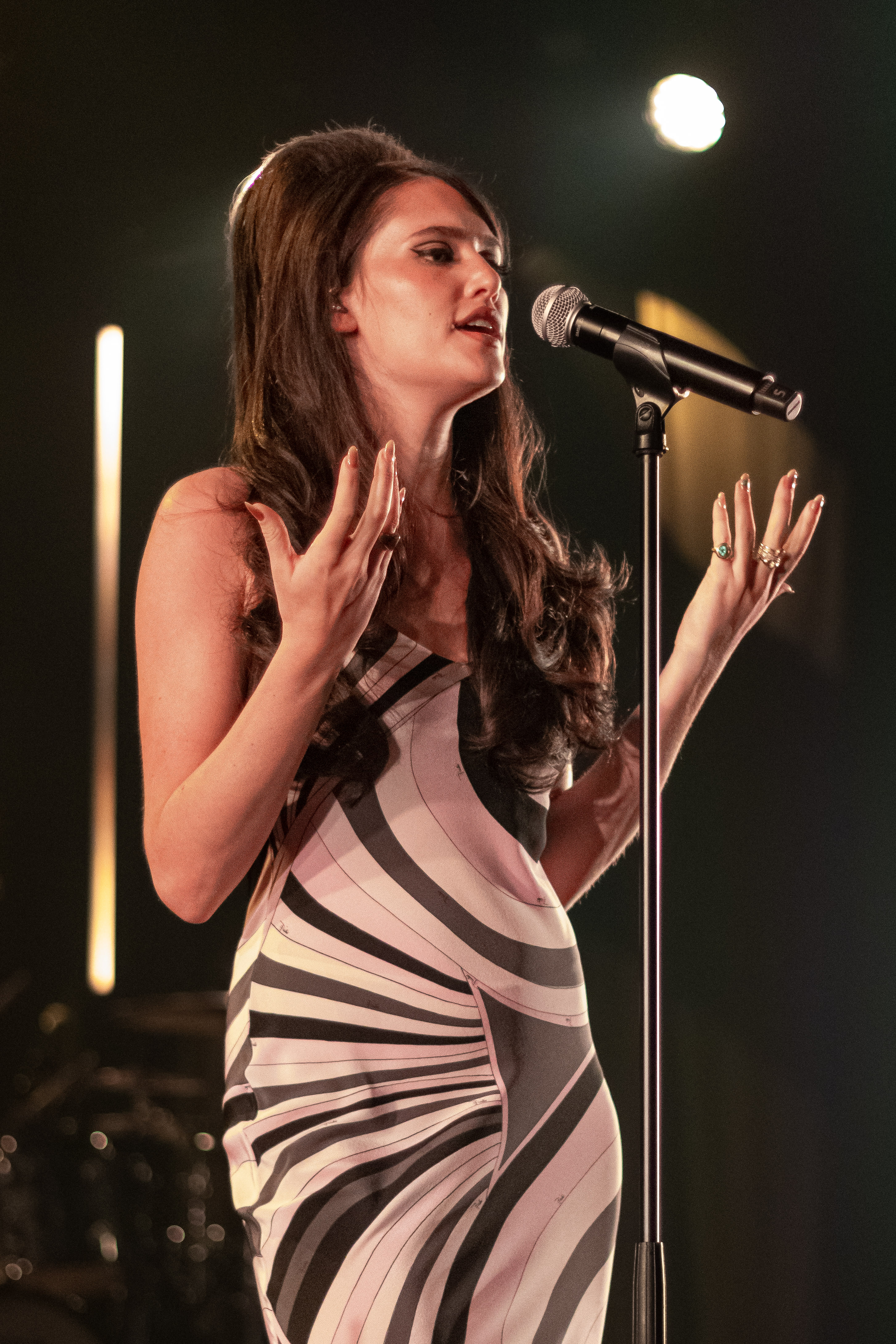
Sienna Spiro has earned two top-ten singles so far this year, including the number-one hit "Great Expectation".

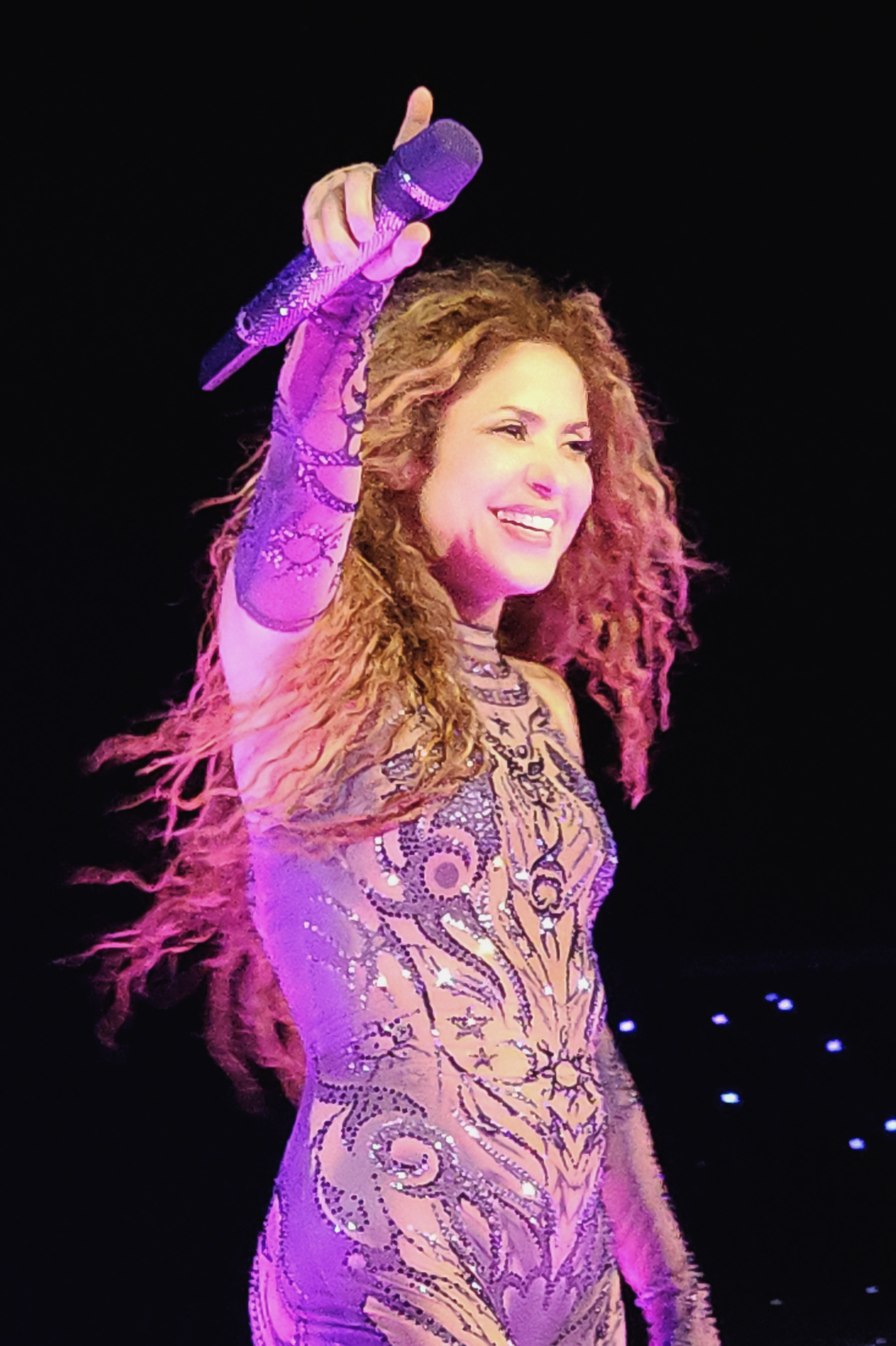
In July of this year, Shakira returned to the UK top-ten for the first time since September 2009, with "Dai Dai", a duet with Burna Boy which was also the official anthem for the 2026 FIFA World Cup. The song rose to number two after Shakira and Burna Boy performed it alongside the Ghetto Kids during the 2026 FIFA World Cup final halftime show, making it the highest-charting official FIFA World Cup song in the UK.

The UK Singles Chart is one of many music charts compiled by the Official Charts Company that calculates the best-selling singles of the week in the United Kingdom. Since 2004 the chart has been based on the sales of both physical singles and digital downloads, with airplay figures excluded from the official chart. Since 2014, the singles chart has been based on both sales and streaming, with the ratio altered in 2017 to 150:1 streams and only three singles by the same artist eligible for the chart. From July 2018, video streams from YouTube Music and Spotify among others began to be counted for the Official Charts. This list shows singles that peaked in the Top 10 of the UK Singles Chart during 2026, as well as singles which peaked in 2025 and 2027 but were in the top 10 in 2026. The entry date is when the song appeared in the top 10 for the first time (week ending, as published by the Official Charts Company, which is six days after the chart is announced).

Eighty-two singles have been in the top ten so far this year (as of 26 November 2026, week ending). Eighteen singles from 2025 remained in the top 10 for several weeks at the beginning of the year. "Rein Me In" by Sam Fender and Olivia Dean, "Where Is My Husband!" by Raye, "So Easy (To Fall in Love)" by Olivia Dean, "Opalite" by Taylor Swift, "Raindance" by Dave featuring Tems, "All I Want for Christmas Is You" by Mariah Carey, "Fairytale of New York" by The Pogues featuring Kirsty MacColl, "Jingle Bell Rock" by Bobby Helms and "Step into Christmas" by Elton John were the songs from 2025 to reach their peak in 2026. Bella Kay, Tame Impala, Ella Langley and Zach Bryan are among the many artists who have achieved their first top 10 single so far in 2026.

"Last Christmas" by Wham!, originally released in 1984, returned to number-one in the first week of 2026. The first new number-one single of the year was "Where Is My Husband!" by Raye. Overall, thirteen different songs have peaked at number-one so far in 2026, with Taylor Swift (3) having the most songs hit that position.

An asterisk (*) in the "Weeks in Top 10" column shows that the song is currently in the top 10.

== Background ==
=== Multiple entries ===
Eighty-two singles have charted in the top 10 so far in 2026 (as of 26 November 2026, week ending), with seventy-four singles reaching their peak this year (including the re-entries "All I Want for Christmas Is You", "Rockin' Around the Christmas Tree", "Jingle Bell Rock", "Fairytale of New York", "Step into Christmas" and "Merry Christmas Everyone", which charted in previous years but reached peaks on their latest chart run).

=== 2024 top-ten hits witness a chart resurgence ===
On 9 January 2026 (15 January 2026, week ending), "End of Beginning", written and recorded by actor Joe Keery under his stage name of Djo, rose to number-one in the UK singles chart, one week after re-entering the top-ten following the premiere of the Stranger Things season 5 finale. Originally released in September 2022 as a track on Keery's album Decide, the song was issued as a single in 2024 after gaining popularity on TikTok, and it had originally peaked at number four in the UK in March of that year. When the song finally hit the top spot, it enjoyed its biggest week on streaming in the UK, having 5.4 million combined streams.

On 11 September 2026 (17 September 2026, week ending), Dua Lipa witnessed a similar resurgence with her 2024 single "Training Season". The song, which originally peaked at number 4 in February 2024, re-entered the top ten at number 7 following a viral social media trend.

=== Harry Styles receives two number ones in 2026 and claims second Chart Double ===
On 30 January 2026 (5 February 2026, week ending), Harry Styles's "Aperture" debuted at number-one in the UK singles chart becoming his third number-one single as a solo artist, and his first since "As It Was" debuted at the top of the charts in April 2022. Additionally, on the UK Albums Chart, Styles' former One Direction bandmate Louis Tomlinson had the number one album with How Did I Get Here?. This became the second time One Direction received the UK Chart Double, the first in November 2012 when the single "Little Things" and the album Take Me Home simultaneously topped the UK Charts.

On 13 March 2026 (19 March 2026, week ending), Styles claimed the Chart Double for the second time in his career, after his single "American Girls" and the parent album Kiss All the Time. Disco, Occasionally simultaneously debuted atop the UK singles chart and UK Albums Chart, respectively.

=== Taylor Swift's The Life of a Showgirl continues to dominate, earns sixth Chart Double and more ===
On 13 February 2026 (19 February 2026, week ending), Taylor Swift received her sixth number-one single on the UK singles chart with "Opalite". The song had originally debuted and peaked at number two in October 2025, following the release of the parent album The Life of a Showgirl, which eventually became the first album by Swift to spawn at least two UK number-one singles after "The Fate of Ophelia" spent seven weeks at number-one.

On 12 June 2026 (18 June 2026, week ending), Swift had her seventh number-one single on the UK Singles Chart with "I Knew It, I Knew You" from the Toy Story 5 soundtrack. This also became the first time in Swift's career where she received multiple number-one singles in a chart year, and she became the first international artist to secure multiple number-ones in 2026. On 19 June 2026 (25 June 2026, week ending), during the song's second week at number one, Swift claimed the biggest week of single sales in three years, with 71,000 units being achieved, surpassing the opening week of sales for "Aperture" by Harry Styles.

On 2 October 2026 (8 October 2026, week ending), Swift achieved the coveted Chart Double for the sixth time in her career after "Patient Zero" debuted at the top of the UK Singles Chart, becoming her eighth UK number-one single, whilst The Life of a Showgirl returned to number-one in the UK Albums Chart following the release of its expanded edition, The Life of a Showgirl: The Encore. Swift also debuted in the top 5 of the singles chart with "Cleveland!" and "Babylon" at numbers three and four, respectively.

=== Sam Fender and Olivia Dean's "Rein Me In" becomes longest-running number-one single ===
On 20 February 2026 (26 February 2026, week ending), Sam Fender achieved his first UK number-one single with "Rein Me In", a duet with Olivia Dean, during the song's 18th week in the top 10. The song also set the new record for the most consecutive weeks in the top 40, with a 35-week climb to the top spot, a record previously held by Ed Sheeran with "Thinking Out Loud" in November 2014, which spent 19 consecutive weeks in the top 40.

On 26 June 2026 (2 July 2026, week ending), almost a year after it had first debuted in the chart at number six, the single spent a fourteenth non-consecutive week at number-one, surpassing Alex Warren's "Ordinary" as the single with the most weeks at number-one in the UK in the 2020s.

On 10 July 2026 (16 July 2026, week ending), during its sixteenth non-consecutive week at the top spot, "Rein Me In" became the longest-running UK number-one single of all time by a British act, surpassing Wet Wet Wet's "Love Is All Around", which spent fifteen weeks at number-one in 1994.

On 31 July 2026 (6 August 2026, week ending), "Rein Me In" surpassed Frankie Laine's 1953 hit "I Believe" to become the longest-running UK number-one single of all time, with nineteen non-consecutive weeks at the summit, eventually extending their record to twenty-three.

=== Olivia Rodrigo receives her fourth UK number-one single ===
On 24 April 2026 (30 April 2026, week ending), Olivia Rodrigo received her fourth UK number-one single with "Drop Dead". The song became Rodrigo's first chart topper in three years, when "Vampire" topped the charts in September 2023.

=== Justin Bieber's chart resurgence following his Coachella performance ===
On 24 April 2026 (30 April 2026, week ending), Justin Bieber entered the top-ten at number 3 with "Beauty and a Beat", a duet with Nicki Minaj, following Bieber's headline performance at Coachella 2026. Upon release, the song originally peaked at number 16 in October 2012 and became Bieber's 29th and Minaj's 16th UK top 10 singles, respectively. Bieber's song "Daisies" also returned to the top-ten at number 5, having originally peaked at number one in July 2025.

=== Michael Jackson sees second posthumous chart resurgence following the release of his biopic, whilst "Thriller" hits top 5 for first time ===
In May 2026, almost seventeen years after his tragic death, and following the release of the biopic Michael, Michael Jackson returned to the top 10 of the UK Singles Chart with several entries. On 8 May 2026 (14 May 2026, week ending), his 1983 hits "Billie Jean" and "Beat It", which originally peaked at numbers one and three, respectively, upon their initial releases, re-entered the top 10 at numbers four and ten, respectively. On 15 May 2026 (21 May 2026, week ending), Jackson's song "Human Nature" from the album Thriller, which had never been released as an official single in the UK, entered the top 10 of the UK Singles Chart at number six.

On 6 November 2026 (12 November 2026, week ending), Jackson's 1983 single "Thriller", now an annual Halloween standard, re-entered the top-ten of the UK Singles Chart at its all time-chart peak of number 5, surpassing the number 9 peak it had reached in November 2025. When the single was first released in 1983, it had originally peaked at number 10 in the UK. In the week before "Thriller" ascended into the UK top five for the first time, the single had experienced a 74% week-on-week consumption increase.

=== The Chemical Brothers return to the top ten following the release of Apex ===
On 15 May 2026 (21 May 2026, week ending), The Chemical Brothers received their first UK top-ten single since 2005 when "Go", a song featured on their 2015 chart-topping album Born in the Echoes, rose to number seven in the UK Singles Chart almost 11 years after its initial release, after experiencing a surge in popularity due to its inclusion in the Netflix film Apex. When the song first charted in 2015, it had only peaked at number 46.

=== Ariana Grande has her first number-one in six years ===
On 5 June 2026 (11 June 2026, week ending), "Hate That I Made You Love Me" by Ariana Grande debuted at the top of the UK Singles Chart, becoming Grande's eighth number-one single. The song went on to become Grande's first number-one single in six years, since "Positions" topped the charts for six consecutive weeks in November 2020.

=== FIFA World Cup songs enter the top ten with Shakira securing first top-ten single in seventeen years ===
On 17 July 2026 (23 July 2026, week ending), following England's defeat to Argentina in the semi-final of the 2026 FIFA World Cup, three singles entered the top-ten amidst the short lived World Cup celebrations. This included "Wonderwall" by Oasis (2), "Three Lions" by Baddiel, Skinner and The Lightning Seeds (3) and "Dai Dai" by Shakira and Burna Boy (5). "Dai Dai", which was the official anthem for the 2026 FIFA World Cup, also became Shakira's first top-ten hit since September 2009, when "She Wolf" peaked at number 4. The next week, "Dai Dai" rose to a new peak of number 2 after Shakira and Burna Boy performed it alongside the Ghetto Kids during the 2026 FIFA World Cup final halftime show, making it the highest-charting official FIFA World Cup song in the UK.

=== Madonna and Kylie Minogue extend their respective chart records ===
On 14 August 2026 (20 August 2026, week ending) Madonna and Kylie Minogue entered the top ten with their collaboration "Love Sensation", which debuted at number 8. The song became Madonna's 65th and Minogue's 37th top-ten single, respectively. The collaboration also became Madonna's highest-charting single since September 2009 when "Celebration" peaked at number 3, and became Minogue's second top-ten single in 2026 following "XMAS", which was the Christmas number-one of 2025.

=== Dolly Parton returns with three top 10 hits following her death as "9 to 5" becomes her highest-charting UK single ever ===
On 28 August 2026 (3 September 2026, week ending), Dolly Parton posthumously returned to the top 10 of the UK Singles Chart, following her death earlier that week at the age of 80, when "Jolene" re-entered at number 9 with a 364% surge in sales, having originally peaked at number 7 in June 1976.

On 4 September 2026 (10 September 2026, week ending), Parton occupied three places in the top 10, as "Jolene" rose to a new chart peak of number 6, whilst her 1980 solo hit "9 to 5" and her 1983 duet with Kenny Rogers, "Islands in the Stream", both climbed into the top 10 at numbers 5 and 9, respectively. "9 to 5" originally peaked only at number 47 in the UK when it was initially released there in 1981, and its ascent into the top 5 45 years later made it Dolly Parton's highest-charting UK single ever. "Islands in the Stream" had peaked at number 7 in the UK when it was released in 1983.

=== Sienna Spiro becomes the youngest British female to top the charts in twelve years ===
On 11 September 2026 (17 September 2026, week ending), Sienna Spiro earned her first UK number-one single with "Great Expectation". At 20 years old, Spiro became the youngest British female to reach the summit since Becky Hill topped the charts in July 2014 with "Gecko (Overdrive)".

=== All-female top six ===
On 25 September 2026 (1 October 2026, week ending), for the second time in chart history the top six songs on the UK Singles Chart were by female artists, a feat which was last achieved in August 2023. Sienna Spiro spent her third week at the peak position with "Great Expectation". Joining Spiro in the top five were Ella Langley's "Choosin' Texas" (2), Stella Lefty's "Boston" (3), Adéla's "Nicole Kidman" (4), and Dua Lipa's "Training Season" (5), while Olivia Rodrigo also appeared at number 6 with "The Cure".

=== Jamie Miller becomes the first Welsh artist to top the charts in fifteen years ===
On 23 October 2026 (29 October 2026, week ending), Jamie Miller earned his first number-one single on the UK Singles Chart with "Babydoll". Miller also became the first Welsh artist to secure a UK number-one single since Sian Evans topped the charts as a feature on DJ Fresh's "Louder", in July 2011. Alongside this, Miller became the first male solo Welsh artist top top the charts in 41 years since "Merry Christmas Everyone" by Shakin' Stevens reached number-one in December 1985.

=== Zach Bryan lands his first top ten single ===
On 23 October 2026 (29 October 2026, week ending), Zach Bryan entered the top-ten for the first time with "Lies", a collaboration with Lana Del Rey, which debuted at number 7. The song also became Del Rey's seventh top-ten single in the UK.

=== Songs from films ===
Original songs from various films entered the top 10 throughout the year. These included "Golden" (from KPop Demon Hunters) and "I Knew It, I Knew You" (from Toy Story 5).

=== Chart debuts ===
Nineteen artists have achieved their first charting top ten single so far in 2026, either as a lead or featured artist.

The following table (collapsed on desktop site) does not include acts who had previously charted as part of a group and received their first top ten solo single.

Artist	Number of top 10s	First entry	Chart position	Other entries
Haven	1	"I Run"	9	—
Kaitlin Aragon	1	"I Run"	9	—
Bella Kay	1	"Iloveitiloveitiloveit"	2	—
Tame Impala	3	"Dracula"	2	"Loser" (10), "Flower in a Hurricane" (9)
Ella Langley	1	"Choosin' Texas"	1	—
Prospa	1	"Free Your Mind"	6	—
Cloonee	1	"Free Your Mind"	6	—
Anotr	1	"Talk to You"	3	—
54 Ultra	1	"Talk to You"	3	—
Hugel	1	"Movin' to the Sun"	2	—
Imael Angel	1	"Movin' to the Sun"	2	—
Stella Lefty	1	"Boston"	3	—
Silva Bumpa	1	"On 2nite"	9	—
Ashe	1	"Stop the Wedding!"	2	—
Adéla	1	"Nicole Kidman"	4	—
Jamie Miller	1	"Babydoll"	1	—
Zach Bryan	1	"Lies"	7	—
Justice	1	"Flower in a Hurricane"	9	—
King Gizzard & the Lizard Wizard	1	"Flower in a Hurricane"	9	—

== Top-ten singles ==
Key

Symbol	Meaning
‡	Single peaked in 2025 but still in chart in 2026.
♦	Single released in 2026 but peaked in 2027.
(#)	Year-end top-ten single position and rank
Entered	The date that the single first appeared in the chart.
Peak	Highest position that the single reached in the UK Singles Chart.

Entered (week ending)	Weeks in top 10	Single	Artist	Peak	Peak reached (week ending)	Weeks at peak
Singles in 2025
3 July 2025	54*	"Rein Me In" ^{[A]}^{[B]}^{[C]}^{[D]}^{[E]}^{[F]}^{[U]}^{[EEE]}^{[FFF]}	Sam Fender & Olivia Dean	1	26 February 2026	23
24 July 2025	9	"Daisies" ‡ ^{[HH]}	Justin Bieber	1	31 July 2025	1
24 July 2025	22	"Golden" ‡ ^{[X]}	Huntrix	1	7 August 2025	10
28 August 2025	39*	"Man I Need" ‡ ^{[V]}^{[BB]}^{[II]}^{[UU]}^{[WW]}^{[III]}	Olivia Dean	1	9 October 2025	1
2 October 2025	19	"Where Is My Husband!" ^{[Q]}	Raye	1	8 January 2026	1
9 October 2025	23	"So Easy (To Fall in Love)" ^{[D]}^{[T]}	Olivia Dean	2	26 February 2026	2
16 October 2025	15	"The Fate of Ophelia" ‡ ^{[R]}	Taylor Swift	1	16 October 2025	7
16 October 2025	11	"Opalite" ^{[AA]}	Taylor Swift	1	19 February 2026	1
6 November 2025	13	"Raindance" ^{[M]}^{[S]}	Dave featuring Tems	1	29 January 2026	2
27 November 2025	5	"Die on This Hill" ‡ ^{[Z]}^{[BBB]}	Sienna Spiro	9	27 November 2025	2
4 December 2025	5	"Last Christmas" ‡ ^{[G]}	Wham!	1	18 December 2025	2
11 December 2025	4	"All I Want for Christmas Is You" ^{[H]}	Mariah Carey	2	1 January 2026	1
11 December 2025	4	"Rockin' Around the Christmas Tree" ^{[I]}	Brenda Lee	3	1 January 2026	1
11 December 2025	4	"Underneath the Tree" ‡ ^{[J]}	Kelly Clarkson	5	18 December 2025	1
18 December 2025	3	"Fairytale of New York" ^{[K]}	The Pogues featuring Kirsty MacColl	5	1 January 2026	1
18 December 2025	3	"Jingle Bell Rock" ^{[L]}	Bobby Helms	8	1 January 2026	1
25 December 2025	2	"XMAS" ‡	Kylie Minogue	1	25 December 2025	1
25 December 2025	2	"Step into Christmas" ^{[N]}	Elton John	7	1 January 2026	1
Singles in 2026
1 January 2026	1	"Merry Christmas Everyone" ^{[O]}	Shakin' Stevens	9	1 January 2026	1
1 January 2026	1	"Driving Home for Christmas" ^{[P]}	Chris Rea	10	1 January 2026	1
8 January 2026	6	"End of Beginning" ^{[W]}	Djo	1	15 January 2026	2
8 January 2026	20	"Lush Life" ^{[Y]}^{[FF]}^{[NN]}	Zara Larsson	3	26 February 2026	1
8 January 2026	2	"I Run"	Haven featuring Kaitlin Aragon	9	15 January 2026	1
22 January 2026	8	"I Just Might"	Bruno Mars	5	29 January 2026	1
5 February 2026	6	"Aperture" ^{[DD]}^{[EE]}	Harry Styles	1	5 February 2026	1
12 February 2026	1	"The Great Divide"	Noah Kahan	10	12 February 2026	1
19 February 2026	3	"DTMF"	Bad Bunny	4	19 February 2026	1
19 February 2026	7	"Stateside" ^{[CC]}	PinkPantheress	3	5 March 2026	1
26 February 2026	13	"Homewrecker"	Sombr	4	23 April 2026	1
5 March 2026	8	"Iloveitiloveitiloveit"	Bella Kay	2	12 March 2026	4
12 March 2026	11	"Fever Dream"	Alex Warren	3	12 March 2026	2
19 March 2026	9	"American Girls" ^{[QQ]}	Harry Styles	1	19 March 2026	1
19 March 2026	1	"Ready, Steady, Go!"	Harry Styles	5	19 March 2026	1
2 April 2026	2	"Swim"	BTS	2	2 April 2026	1
9 April 2026	12	"Dracula"	Tame Impala	2	23 April 2026	3
9 April 2026	5	"Babydoll"	Dominic Fike	5	23 April 2026	1
16 April 2026	3	"White Keys"	Dominic Fike	7	23 April 2026	1
30 April 2026	10	"Drop Dead" ^{[PP]}	Olivia Rodrigo	1	30 April 2026	1
30 April 2026	4	"Beauty and a Beat" ^{[GG]}	Justin Bieber featuring Nicki Minaj	3	30 April 2026	2
14 May 2026	10	"Billie Jean" ^{[JJ]}	Michael Jackson	3	21 May 2026	4
14 May 2026	5	"Midnight Sun" ^{[KK]}^{[OO]}	Zara Larsson	7	14 May 2026	1
14 May 2026	8	"Beat It" ^{[LL]}	Michael Jackson	5	21 May 2026	1
21 May 2026	2	"Human Nature"	Michael Jackson	6	21 May 2026	1
21 May 2026	5	"Go" ^{[MM]}	The Chemical Brothers	4	4 June 2026	1
28 May 2026	4	"Janice STFU"	Drake	2	28 May 2026	1
28 May 2026	1	"National Treasures"	Drake	3	28 May 2026	1
28 May 2026	1	"Make Them Cry"	Drake	6	28 May 2026	1
4 June 2026	20	"The Cure" ^{[TT]}^{[VV]}	Olivia Rodrigo	2	4 June 2026	1
11 June 2026	13	"Hate That I Made You Love Me"	Ariana Grande	1	11 June 2026	1
18 June 2026	7	"I Knew It, I Knew You"	Taylor Swift	1	18 June 2026	2
25 June 2026	9	"Stupid Song"	Olivia Rodrigo	2	25 June 2026	4
2 July 2026	22*	"Choosin' Texas"	Ella Langley	1	10 September 2026	1
9 July 2026	6	"Free Your Mind"	Prospa & Cloonee	6	30 July 2026	2
23 July 2026	2	"Wonderwall" ^{[RR]}	Oasis	2	23 July 2026	1
23 July 2026	1	"Three Lions" ^{[SS]}	Baddiel & Skinner & The Lightning Seeds	3	23 July 2026	1
23 July 2026	4	"Talk to You"	Anotr featuring 54 Ultra	3	30 July 2026	1
23 July 2026	6	"Dai Dai"	Shakira & Burna Boy	2	30 July 2026	5
6 August 2026	8	"Movin' to the Sun"	Hugel, Imael Angel & Ultra Naté	2	3 September 2026	1
13 August 2026	1	"Petal"	Ariana Grande	4	13 August 2026	1
13 August 2026	16*	"Great Expectation"	Sienna Spiro	1	17 September 2026	3
20 August 2026	1	"Love Sensation"	Madonna & Kylie Minogue	8	20 August 2026	1
20 August 2026	10	"Boston"	Stella Lefty	3	1 October 2026	1
20 August 2026	3	"On 2nite"	Silva Bumpa	9	27 August 2026	1
3 September 2026	2	"Jolene" ^{[XX]}	Dolly Parton	6	10 September 2026	1
10 September 2026	2	"9 to 5" ^{[YY]}	Dolly Parton	5	10 September 2026	1
10 September 2026	1	"Islands in the Stream" ^{[ZZ]}	Kenny Rogers & Dolly Parton	9	10 September 2026	1
17 September 2026	4	"Training Season" ^{[AAA]}^{[CCC]}	Dua Lipa	5	24 September 2026	2
17 September 2026	1	"Loser"	Tame Impala	10	17 September 2026	1
24 September 2026	10*	"Stop the Wedding!"	Ashe	2	19 November 2026	2
1 October 2026	9*	"Nicole Kidman"	Adéla	4	1 October 2026	1
1 October 2026	9*	"Babydoll"	Jamie Miller	1	29 October 2026	5
1 October 2026	7*	"My Body Isn't Ready" ^{[DDD]}^{[GGG]}	Sombr	3	26 November 2026	1
8 October 2026	4	"Patient Zero"	Taylor Swift	1	8 October 2026	3
8 October 2026	1	"Cleveland!"	Taylor Swift	3	8 October 2026	1
8 October 2026	1	"Babylon"	Taylor Swift	4	8 October 2026	1
29 October 2026	5*	"Housewife"	Tate McRae	2	29 October 2026	3
29 October 2026	4	"Expectations"	Olivia Rodrigo featuring Chappell Roan	3	29 October 2026	1
29 October 2026	1	"Lies"	Zach Bryan featuring Lana Del Rey	7	29 October 2026	1
12 November 2026	1	"Thriller" ^{[HHH]}	Michael Jackson	5	12 November 2026	1
19 November 2026	1	"Take Me Home (4 Christmas)"	Olivia Rodrigo	8	19 November 2026	1
26 November 2026	1*	"Flower in a Hurricane"	Justice featuring Tame Impala, SZA & King Gizzard & the Lizard Wizard	9	26 November 2026	1

== Entries by artist ==
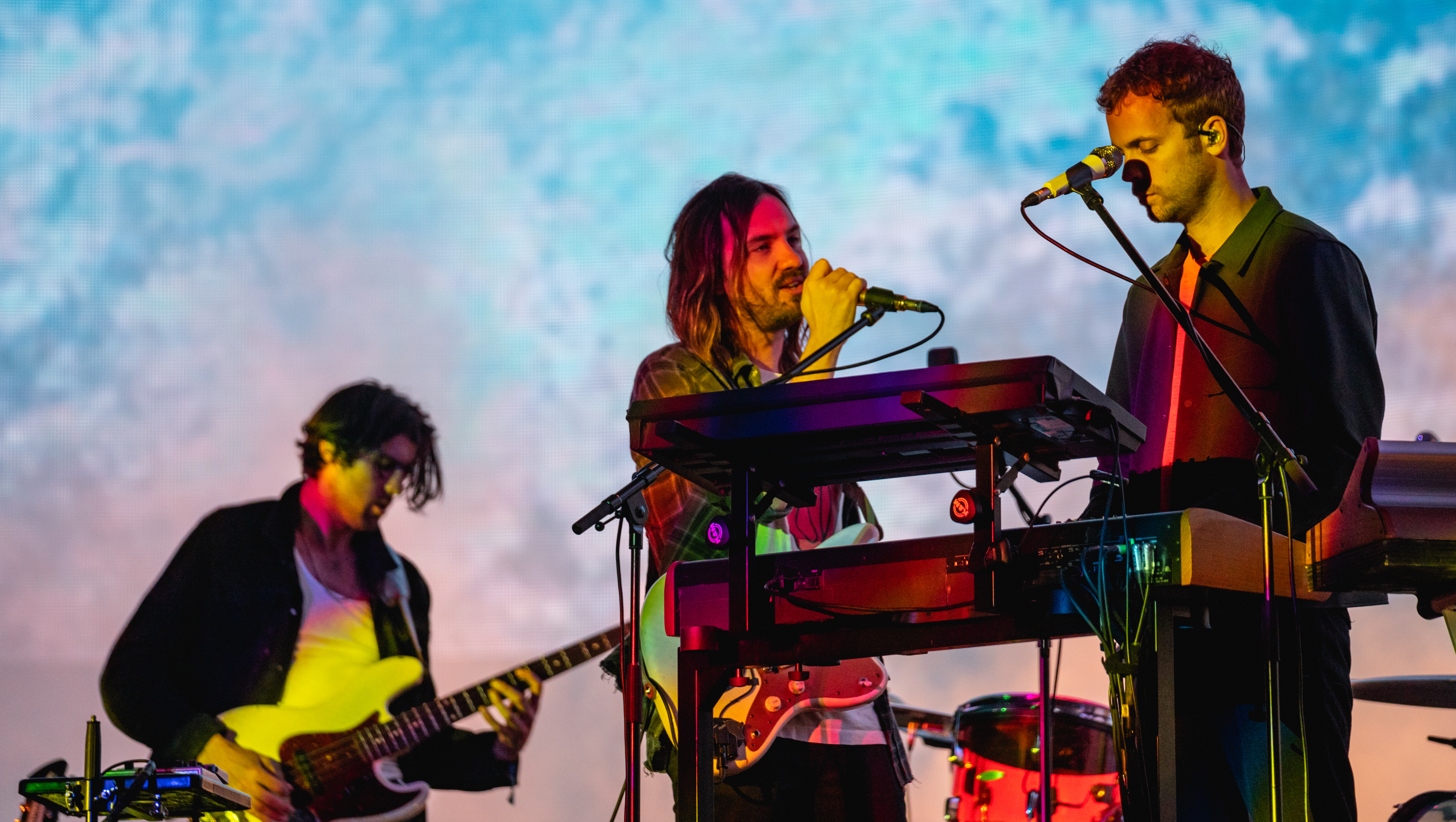
After securing three consecutive top 10 albums in the UK going back to 2015, Australian musical project Tame Impala secured three top 10 hits in 2026, including the number two hit "Dracula".

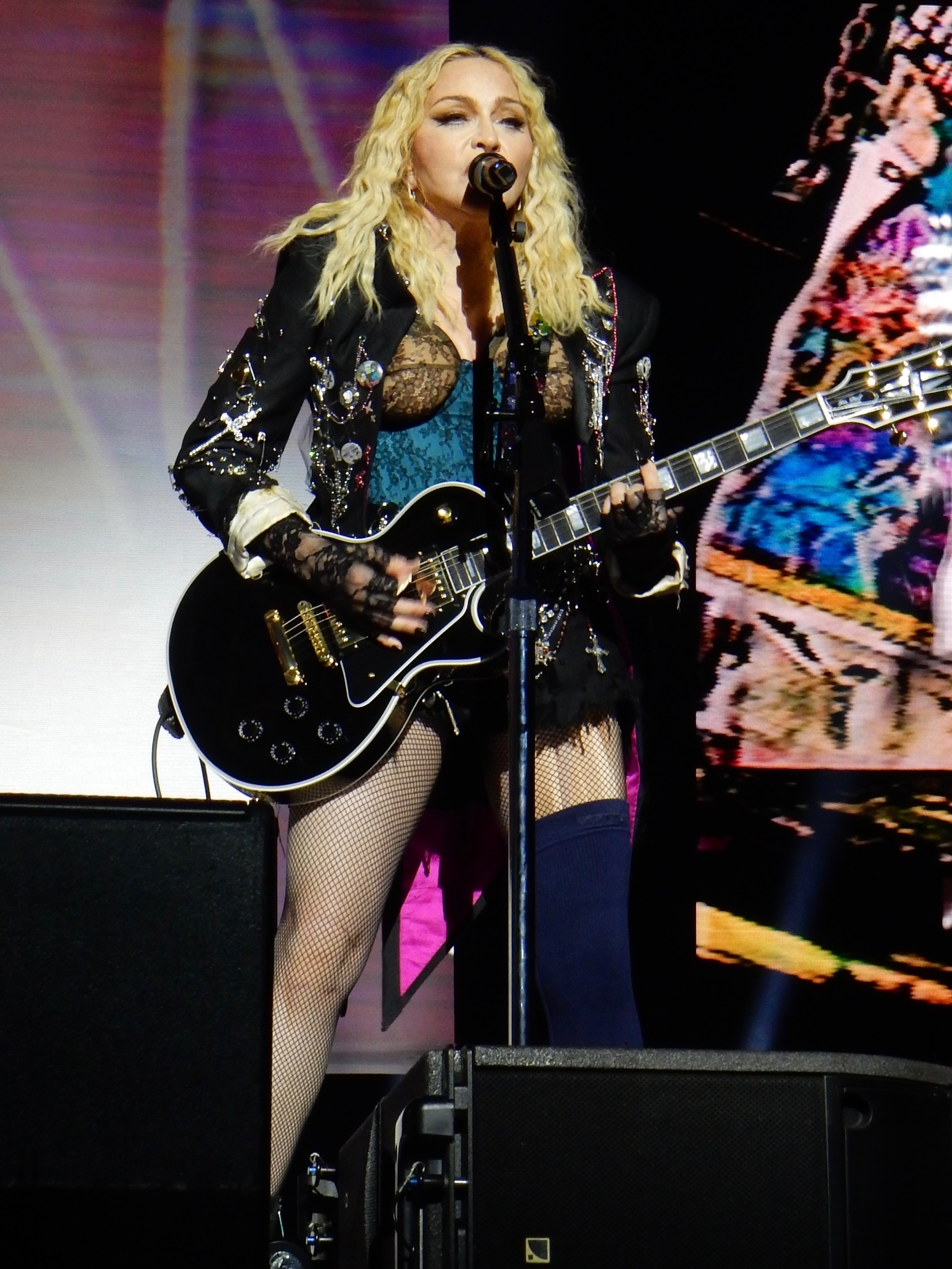
In August of this year, Madonna earned her first UK top 10 single as a lead artist in 17 years with "Love Sensation", a collaboration with Kylie Minogue.

The following table shows artists who achieved two or more top 10 entries in 2026, including singles that reached their peak in 2025. The figures include both main artists and featured artists, while appearances on ensemble charity records are also counted for each artist. The total number of weeks an artist spent in the top ten in 2026 is also shown.

Entries	Artist	Weeks	Singles
6	Taylor Swift	20	"The Fate of Ophelia", "Opalite", "I Knew It, I Knew You", "Patient Zero", "Cleveland!", "Babylon"
5	Olivia Rodrigo	30	"Drop Dead", "The Cure", "Stupid Song", "Expectations", "Take Me Home (4 Christmas)"
4	Michael Jackson	11	"Billie Jean", "Beat It", "Human Nature", "Thriller"
3	Olivia Dean	44*	"Rein Me In", "Man I Need", "So Easy (To Fall in Love)"
3	Tame Impala	14*	"Dracula", "Loser", "Flower in a Hurricane"
3	Harry Styles	12	"Aperture", "American Girls", "Ready, Steady, Go!"
3	Drake	4	"Janice STFU", "National Treasures", "Make Them Cry"
3	Dolly Parton	3	"Jolene", "9 to 5", "Islands in the Stream"
2	Zara Larsson	22	"Lush Life", "Midnight Sun"
2	Sienna Spiro	20*	"Die on This Hill", "Great Expectation"
2	Sombr	20*	"Homewrecker", "My Body Isn't Ready"
2	Ariana Grande	13	"Hate That I Made You Love Me", "Petal"
2	Dominic Fike	5	"Babydoll", "White Keys"
2	Justin Bieber	4	"Daisies", "Beauty and a Beat"
2	Kylie Minogue	2	"XMAS", "Love Sensation"

== Notes ==
- ^{a} "Rein Me In" re-entered the top 10 at number 10 on 17 July 2025 (week ending).
- ^{b} "Rein Me In" re-entered the top 10 at number 10 on 4 September 2025 (week ending).
- ^{c} "Rein Me In" re-entered the top 10 at number 10 on 25 September 2025 (week ending).
- ^{d} "So Easy (To Fall in Love)" re-entered the top 10 at number 8 on 23 October 2025 (week ending).
- ^{e} "Rein Me In" re-entered the top 10 at number 10 on 30 October 2025 (week ending).
- ^{f} "Rein Me In" re-entered the top 10 at number 8 on 20 November 2025 (week ending).
- ^{g} "Last Christmas" re-entered the top 10 at number 9 on 4 December 2025 (week ending). The song originally peaked at number 2 upon its initial release in 1984 and reached number-one for the first time ever on 7 January 2021 (week ending).
- ^{h} "All I Want for Christmas Is You" re-entered the top 10 at number 4 on 11 December 2025 (week ending). The song originally peaked at number 2 upon its initial release in 1994 and reached number-one for the first time ever on 17 December 2020 (week ending).
- ^{i} "Rockin' Around the Christmas Tree" re-entered the top 10 at number 6 on 11 December 2025 (week ending). Having originally peaked at number 6 upon its original release in 1962, the song reached a new peak of number 3 on 1 January 2026 (week ending).
- ^{j} "Underneath the Tree" re-entered the top 10 at number 9 on 11 December 2025 (week ending) and rose to a new peak of number 5 on 18 December 2025 (week ending). The song first charted at number 30 in 2014, and entered the top 10 for the first time at number 10 on 19 December 2024 (week ending).
- ^{k} "Fairytale of New York" re-entered the top 10 at number 8 on 18 December 2025 (week ending). The song originally peaked at number 2 upon release in 1987.
- ^{l} "Jingle Bell Rock" re-entered the top 10 at number 10 on 18 December 2025 (week ending). The song entered the top 10 for the first time ever on 5 January 2023 (week ending), and later reached a new peak of number 5 on 2 January 2025 (week ending).
- ^{m} "Raindance" re-entered the top 10 at number 7 on 25 December 2025 (week ending).
- ^{n} "Step into Christmas" re-entered the top 10 at number 9 on 25 December 2025 (week ending). Having originally peaked at number 24 upon its initial release in 1973, the song entered the top 10 for the first time on 3 January 2019 (week ending) at number 10. It reached its highest-ever chart peak of number 7 on 1 January 2026 (week ending).
- ^{o} "Merry Christmas Everyone" re-entered the top 10 at number 9 on 1 January 2026 (week ending), having originally peaked at number-one upon its original release in 1985.
- ^{p} "Driving Home for Christmas" first charted at number 53 upon release in 1988. The song entered the top 10 for the first time ever at number 10 on 6 January 2022 (week ending). The song re-peaked on 1 January 2026 (week ending), following Rea's death in late 2025.
- ^{q} "Where Is My Husband!" re-entered the top 10 at number-one on 8 January 2026 (week ending).
- ^{r} "The Fate of Ophelia" re-entered the top 10 at number 2 on 8 January 2026 (week ending).
- ^{s} "Raindance" re-entered the top 10 at number 3 on 8 January 2026 (week ending).
- ^{t} "So Easy (To Fall in Love)" re-entered the top 10 at number 4 on 8 January 2026 (week ending).
- ^{u} "Rein Me In" re-entered the top 10 at number 5 on 8 January 2026 (week ending).
- ^{v} "Man I Need" re-entered the top 10 at number 6 on 8 January 2026 (week ending).
- ^{w} "End of Beginning" originally peaked at number 4 upon its initial release in 2024. The song re-entered the top 10 at number 7 on 8 January 2026 (week ending), following the premiere of the Stranger Things season 5 finale. It later rose to a new peak of number-one on 15 January 2026 (week ending).
- ^{x} "Golden" re-entered the top 10 at number 8 on 8 January 2026 (week ending).
- ^{y} "Lush Life" originally peaked at number 3 upon its initial release in 2016. In November 2025, the song saw a resurgence on the international charts, following a viral video of a fan who performed the song's choreography on stage with Larsson during her Midnight Sun Tour. As a result, the song re-entered the top 10 at number 9 on 8 January 2026 (week ending).
- ^{z} "Die on This Hill" re-entered the top 10 at number 10 on 22 January 2026 (week ending).
- ^{aa} "Opalite" re-entered the top 10 at number-one on 19 February 2026 (week ending), following the release of the song's music video as the second single from the album The Life of a Showgirl.
- ^{bb} "Man I Need" re-entered the top 10 at number 8 on 19 February 2026 (week ending).
- ^{cc} "Stateside" entered the top 10 at number 10 on 19 February 2026 (week ending), following the viral popularity of the remix featuring Zara Larsson.
- ^{dd} "Aperture" re-entered the top 10 at number 10 on 26 February 2026 (week ending).
- ^{ee} "Aperture" re-entered the top 10 at number 10 on 12 March 2026 (week ending), following Styles' opening performance at the Brit Awards 2026.
- ^{ff} "Lush Life" re-entered the top 10 at number 8 on 26 March 2026 (week ending).
- ^{gg} "Beauty and a Beat" originally peaked outside the top 10 at number 16 upon its initial release in 2012. The song entered the top 10 for the first time at number 3 on 30 April 2026 (week ending), following Bieber's performance of it at Coachella 2026.
- ^{hh} "Daisies" re-entered the top 10 at number 5 on 30 April 2026 (week ending), following Bieber's performance of it at Coachella 2026.
- ^{ii} "Man I Need" re-entered the top 10 at number 9 on 7 May 2026 (week ending).
- ^{jj} "Billie Jean" originally peaked at number-one upon its initial release in 1983. Following the release of the film Michael, the song re-entered the top 10 at number 4 on 14 May 2026 (week ending).
- ^{kk} "Midnight Sun" entered the top 10 at number 7 on 14 May 2026 (week ending), following the release of the subsequent remix featuring PinkPantheress and the release of the parent remix album Midnight Sun: Girls Trip. The song originally peaked at number 12 in April 2026.
- ^{ll} "Beat It" originally peaked at number 3 upon its initial release in 1983. Following the release of the film Michael, the song re-entered the top 10 at number 10 on 14 May 2026 (week ending).
- ^{mm} "Go" entered the top 10 for the first time at number 7 on 21 May 2026 (week ending) after being featured in the film Apex. The song originally peaked at number 46 upon its initial release in 2015.
- ^{nn} "Lush Life" re-entered the top 10 at number 7 on 4 June 2026 (week ending).
- ^{oo} "Midnight Sun" re-entered the top 10 at number 9 on 4 June 2026 (week ending).
- ^{pp} "Drop Dead" re-entered the top 10 at number 5 on 25 June 2026 (week ending), following the release of the parent album You Seem Pretty Sad for a Girl So in Love.
- ^{qq} "American Girls" re-entered the top 10 at number 8 on 2 July 2026 (week ending).
- ^{rr} "Wonderwall" originally peaked at number 2 upon its initial release in 1995. After being used as an unofficial anthem for the England national football team during the 2026 FIFA World Cup, the song re-entered the top 10 at number 2 on 23 July 2026 (week ending).
- ^{ss} "Three Lions" originally peaked at number-one upon its initial release in 1996. It had further spells in the top 10 in 2006, 2010, 2021, 2024, and another spell at number-one in 2018. Following England's defeat to Argentina in the semi-final of the 2026 FIFA World Cup, the song re-entered the top 10 at number 3 on 23 July 2026 (week ending).
- ^{tt} "The Cure" re-entered the top 10 at number 9 on 30 July 2026 (week ending).
- ^{uu} "Man I Need" re-entered the top 10 at number 10 on 6 August 2026 (week ending).
- ^{vv} "The Cure" re-entered the top 10 at number 8 on 27 August 2026 (week ending).
- ^{ww} "Man I Need" re-entered the top 10 at number 10 on 27 August 2026 (week ending).
- ^{xx} "Jolene" originally peaked at number 7 upon its initial release in 1976. Following Dolly Parton's death in August 2026, the song re-entered the top 10 at number 9 on 3 September 2026 (week ending), rising to a new peak of number 6 the following week.
- ^{yy} "9 to 5" originally peaked outside the top 10 at number 47 upon its initial release in 1981. Following Dolly Parton's death in August 2026, the song entered the top 10 for the first time at number 5 on 10 September 2026 (week ending).
- ^{zz} "Islands in the Stream" originally peaked at number 7 upon its initial release in 1983. Following Dolly Parton's death in August 2026, the song re-entered the top 10 at number 9 on 10 September 2026 (week ending).
- ^{aaa} "Training Season" originally peaked at number 4 upon its initial release in 2024. The song re-entered the top 10 at number 7 on 17 September 2026 (week ending), after it saw a resurgence on the worldwide charts due to going viral on social media.
- ^{bbb} "Die on This Hill" re-entered the top 10 at number 10 on 24 September 2026 (week ending).
- ^{ccc} "Training Season" song re-entered the top 10 at number 9 on 15 October 2026 (week ending).
- ^{ddd} "My Body Isn't Ready" re-entered the top 10 at number 10 on 15 October 2026 (week ending).
- ^{eee} "Rein Me In" re-entered the top 10 at number 9 on 22 October 2026 (week ending).
- ^{fff} "Rein Me In" re-entered the top 10 at number 8 on 5 November 2026 (week ending).
- ^{ggg} "My Body Isn't Ready" re-entered the top 10 at number 10 on 5 November 2026 (week ending).
- ^{hhh} "Thriller" originally peaked at number 10 upon its initial release in 1983. It reached a new peak of number 9 in 2025. It re-entered the top 10 at a brand new peak of number 5 on 12 November 2026 (week ending).
- ^{iii} "Man I Need" re-entered the top 10 at number 10 on 26 November 2026 (week ending).
