= Favour (song) =

2026 song by Fisher and Tones and I

Single by Fisher and Tones and I
- Released: 3 April 2026
- Length: 3:14
- Label: Catch & Release
- Songwriters: Paul Fisher; Toni Watson; Randy Belculfine
- Producers: Fisher; Tones and I

Fisher singles chronology
| "Rain" (2026) | "Favour" (2026) | "What a Life" (2026) |

Tones and I singles chronology
| "Gone Gone Gone" (2025) | "Favour" (2026) | "Mercy" (2026) |

"Favour" is a song by Australian producer Fisher and Australian singer Tones and I released as a single through Catch & Release.

== Reception ==
Lauren McNamara from Rolling Stone Australia said "The upbeat tech house song seamlessly fuses Fisher's club energy with Tones and I's pop sensibility." The Note called the song "a techno club banger".

Lissy Lubeck from Ibiza Spotlight said "Driven by a heavy groove and Tones' instantly recognisable vocal, 'Favour' pairs Fisher's signature high-impact production with Tones and I's unmistakable harmonies. They combine to create a crossover anthem that wields lots of melody, yet still possesses big room energy."

== Charts ==
=== Weekly charts ===
Weekly chart performance
| Chart (2026) | Peak position |
|---|---|
| Australian Artist (ARIA) | 4 |
| Global Dance Radio (Billboard/WARM) | 3 |
| Latvia Airplay (LaIPA) | 13 |
| Latvia Airplay (TopHit) | 1 |
| Lithuania Airplay (TopHit) | 79 |
| New Zealand Hot Singles (RMNZ) | 3 |
| New Zealand Airplay (RCS) | 11 |
| Nicaragua Anglo Airplay (Monitor Latino) | 5 |
| UK Singles (Official Charts) | 100 |
| UK Dance (Official Charts) | 34 |
| UK Independent (Official Charts) | 38 |
| US Dance Airplay (Billboard) | 1 |
| US Hot Dance/Electronic Songs (Billboard) | 14 |
| Venezuela Anglo Airplay (Monitor Latino) | 7 |

=== Monthly charts ===
Monthly chart performance
| Chart (2026) | Peak position |
|---|---|
| Latvia Airplay (TopHit) | 7 |

== See also ==
- List of Billboard number-one dance songs of 2026
