= Mr. Know It All (Teddy Swims song) =

2026 single by Teddy Swims

Single by Teddy Swims

from the album Ugly
- Released: April 10, 2026
- Length: 3:18
- Label: Warner
- Songwriters: Alexander Izquierdo; Ed Drewett; Jaten Dimsdale; Joshua Coleman; Julian Bunetta; Rosie Danvers
- Producers: Ammo; Bunetta; John Ryan

Teddy Swims singles chronology
| "Gone Gone Gone" (2025) | "Mr. Know It All" (2026) | "Break Up in Reverse" (2026) |

Music video
- "Mr. Know It All" on YouTube

"Mr. Know It All" is a song by American singer-songwriter Teddy Swims. A track about the pain of sabotaging one's personal love life, it was written by Swims alongside Alexander Izquierdo, Ed Drewett, Joshua Coleman, Julian Bunetta, and Rosie Danvers, and was released on April 10, 2026, through Warner as the lead single for Swims' upcoming third studio album Ugly (2027).

== Background and composition ==
"Mr. Know It All" was written by Teddy Swims, together with Alexander Izquierdo, Ed Drewett, Rosie Danvers, Joshua Coleman, and Julian Bunetta, with the latter two and John Ryan co-producing the song. The track was described as a blend of "vintage '80s-inspired rock and R&B production".

According to Swims, the song "explores the idea that love can become a self-fulfilling contradiction". He further explained, "when you believe you already know how it ends, you protect yourself by holding back and that distance becomes the reason it fails. But when you try to fight that fate and control every outcome, you can end up suffocating the connection". Swims added that the track is a spin on Robert K. Merton's the prophet's dilemma.

== Release ==
The song was officially released as a single on April 10, 2026, through Warner. Swims debuted the song live on the music festival Coachella 2026 that same day.

== Music video ==
The music video was released on April 9, 2026 on Swims' official YouTube channel. It featured Swims singing with a graffiti wall behind him, visuals of eyes, and an owl. The owl in the video was believed to symbolize wisdom and it looked at what the future would look like.

== Credits and personnel ==
Credits are adapted via Tidal.

=== Musicians ===
- Jaten Dimsdale – lead vocals, background vocals
- Julian Bunetta – background vocals, bass, drums, guitar, keyboards
- Ed Drewett – background vocals
- Joshua Coleman – drums
- John Ryan – drums

=== Technical ===
- Nathan Dantzler – mastering
- Alex Ghenea – mixing
- Jeff Gunnell – engineering
- Julian Bunetta – programming
- Harrison Tate – mastering assistance

== Charts ==
=== Weekly charts ===
Weekly chart performance
| Chart (2026) | Peak position |
|---|---|
| Argentina Anglo Airplay (Monitor Latino) | 11 |
| Australia (ARIA) | 65 |
| Australia Airplay (RCS) | 11 |
| Austria (Ö3 Austria Top 40) | 49 |
| Austria Airplay (IFPI) | 1 |
| Belarus Airplay (TopHit) | 2 |
| Belgium (Ultratop 50 Flanders) | 4 |
| Belgium (Ultratop 50 Wallonia) | 4 |
| Bulgaria Airplay (PROPHON) | 1 |
| Canada Hot 100 (Billboard) | 28 |
| Canada AC (Billboard) | 8 |
| Canada CHR/Top 40 (Billboard) | 32 |
| Canada Hot AC (Billboard) | 7 |
| CIS Airplay (TopHit) | 1 |
| Croatia International Airplay (Top lista) | 1 |
| Czech Republic Airplay (ČNS IFPI) | 4 |
| Denmark Airplay (Tracklisten) | 8 |
| Dominican Republic Anglo Airplay (Monitor Latino) | 14 |
| Ecuador Anglo Airplay (Monitor Latino) | 9 |
| Estonia Airplay (TopHit) | 1 |
| Finland Airplay (Radiosoittolista) | 19 |
| France (SNEP) | 53 |
| France Airplay (SNEP) | 2 |
| Germany (GfK) | 24 |
| Germany Airplay (MusicTrace) | 1 |
| Global 200 (Billboard) | 182 |
| Greece Airplay (IFPI) | 20 |
| Hungary (Editors' Choice Top 40) | 1 |
| Hungary (Rádiós Top 40) | 4 |
| Ireland (IRMA) | 46 |
| Italy Airplay (EarOne) | 34 |
| Kazakhstan Airplay (TopHit) | 13 |
| Latin America Anglo Airplay (Monitor Latino) | 18 |
| Latvia Airplay (TopHit) | 142 |
| Lebanon (Lebanese Top 20) | 7 |
| Lithuania (AGATA) | 82 |
| Lithuania Airplay (TopHit) | 1 |
| Moldova Airplay (TopHit) | 1 |
| Netherlands (Dutch Top 40) | 2 |
| Netherlands (Single Top 100) | 14 |
| Netherlands Airplay (Dutch Charts) | 1 |
| New Zealand Hot Singles (RMNZ) | 4 |
| New Zealand Airplay (RCS) | 20 |
| Nicaragua Anglo Airplay (Monitor Latino) | 4 |
| Nigeria Airplay (TurnTable) | 91 |
| North Macedonia Airplay (Radiomonitor) | 1 |
| Norway (VG-lista) | 15 |
| Norway Airplay (IFPI) | 16 |
| Panama Anglo Airplay (Monitor Latino) | 14 |
| Poland Airplay (OLiS) | 2 |
| Poland Streaming (OLiS) | 64 |
| Portugal Airplay (AFP) | 9 |
| Puerto Rico Anglo Airplay (Monitor Latino) | 7 |
| Romania Airplay (Media Forest) | 16 |
| Russia Airplay (TopHit) | 1 |
| San Marino Airplay (SMRTV Top 50) | 33 |
| Serbia Airplay (Radiomonitor) | 2 |
| Slovakia Airplay (ČNS IFPI) | 2 |
| Slovakia Singles Digital (ČNS IFPI) | 89 |
| Slovenia Airplay (Radiomonitor) | 1 |
| Spain Airplay (Promusicae) | 2 |
| Suriname (Nationale Top 40) | 21 |
| Sweden (Sverigetopplistan) | 37 |
| Switzerland (Schweizer Hitparade) | 26 |
| Switzerland Airplay (MusicTrace) | 1 |
| Turkey International Airplay (Radiomonitor Türkiye) | 1 |
| Ukraine Airplay (TopHit) | 3 |
| UK Singles (Official Charts) | 54 |
| Uruguay Anglo Airplay (Monitor Latino) | 9 |
| US Billboard Hot 100 | 22 |
| US Adult Contemporary (Billboard) | 11 |
| US Adult Pop Airplay (Billboard) | 8 |
| US Pop Airplay (Billboard) | 1 |

=== Monthly charts ===
Monthly chart performance
| Chart (2026) | Peak position |
|---|---|
| Belarus Airplay (TopHit) | 2 |
| CIS Airplay (TopHit) | 2 |
| Estonia Airplay (TopHit) | 2 |
| Kazakhstan Airplay (TopHit) | 12 |
| Lithuania Airplay (TopHit) | 1 |
| Moldova Airplay (TopHit) | 1 |
| Romania Airplay (TopHit) | 19 |
| Russia Airplay (TopHit) | 3 |
| Ukraine Airplay (TopHit) | 8 |

== Certifications ==
Certifications
| Region | Certification | Certified units/sales |
|---|---|---|
| Canada (Music Canada) | Gold | 40,000^{‡} |
| France (SNEP) | Gold | 100,000^{‡} |
| New Zealand (RMNZ) | Gold | 15,000^{‡} |
^{‡} Sales+streaming figures based on certification alone.

== Release history ==
Release dates and formats
| Region | Date | Format(s) | Version | Label | Ref. |
|---|---|---|---|---|---|
| Various | April 10, 2026 | Digital download; streaming | Original | Warner | |
| Italy | April 10, 2026 | Radio airplay | Original | Warner | |
| United States | April 28, 2026 | Contemporary hit radio | Original | Warner | |
| Various | July 31, 2026 | Digital download; streaming | Piano version | Warner | |
| Various | September 4, 2026 | Digital download; streaming | Remixes | Warner | |
