= Danceteria (song) =

2026 single by Madonna

- Harry Romero remix cover

Single by Madonna

from the album Confessions II
- Released: July 10, 2026
- Studio: Start Here (London)
- Genre: House; disco; electroclash; French house
- Length: 3:55
- Label: Warner
- Songwriters: Madonna; Andrew Watt; Henry Walter; Stuart Price; Lou Reed; Jeremiah Patrick Lordan
- Producers: Madonna; Andrew Watt; Cirkut; Stuart Price

Madonna singles chronology
"Love Sensation" (2026)	"Danceteria" (2026)	"Love Sensation (Afterhours Mix)" (2026)

Lyric video
- "Danceteria" on YouTube

"Danceteria" is a song by the American singer Madonna from her fifteenth studio album, Confessions II (2026). It was released on July 10, 2026, through Warner Records, as the third single from the album. It was written and produced by Madonna, Andrew Watt, Cirkut and Stuart Price, and uses an interpolation of "Walk on the Wild Side" (1973), written by Lou Reed, and elements from "Apache", written by Jerry Lordan. Prior to its release, it was included in Madonna's short musical film, Confessions II (2026). The scene was set in a nightclub bathroom, featuring cameo appearances by multiple celebrities. A remix with the British singer Charli XCX, "Danceteria Afterhours", was released on September 24, 2026.

"Danceteria" is a disco, electroclash and French house song. It is a tribute to the 1980s New York City downtown scene, including the Danceteria nightclub. In the lyrics, Madonna mentions her memories and friends from that time. The song received acclaim from music critics, who called it the album's highlight. It was nominated for Best Dance Pop Recording at the 69th Annual Grammy Awards. Madonna and Charli XCX performed "Danceteria Afterhours" at the 2026 MTV Video Music Awards, recreating the scene from the film.

== Background and recording ==
In the early 1980s, Madonna frequently attended the Danceteria nightclub in New York City. In 1982, she met DJ Mark Kamins there and asked him to play her song "Everybody," which ultimately led her to sign her first record deal with Sire Records. While working on the Confessions II album, she shared the memories about Danceteria with her co-producer Stuart Price, which inspired her to write a song about it. On the following day, she came to the studio with three pages of lyrics, which mentioned her friends from that time. She wrote and produced the song with Andrew Watt, Cirkut and Price. It interpolates the hook from Lou Reed's 1973 song "Walk on the Wild Side," thus Reed was credited as a co-writer, and elements from "Apache", written by Jerry Lordan.

== Release and promotion ==
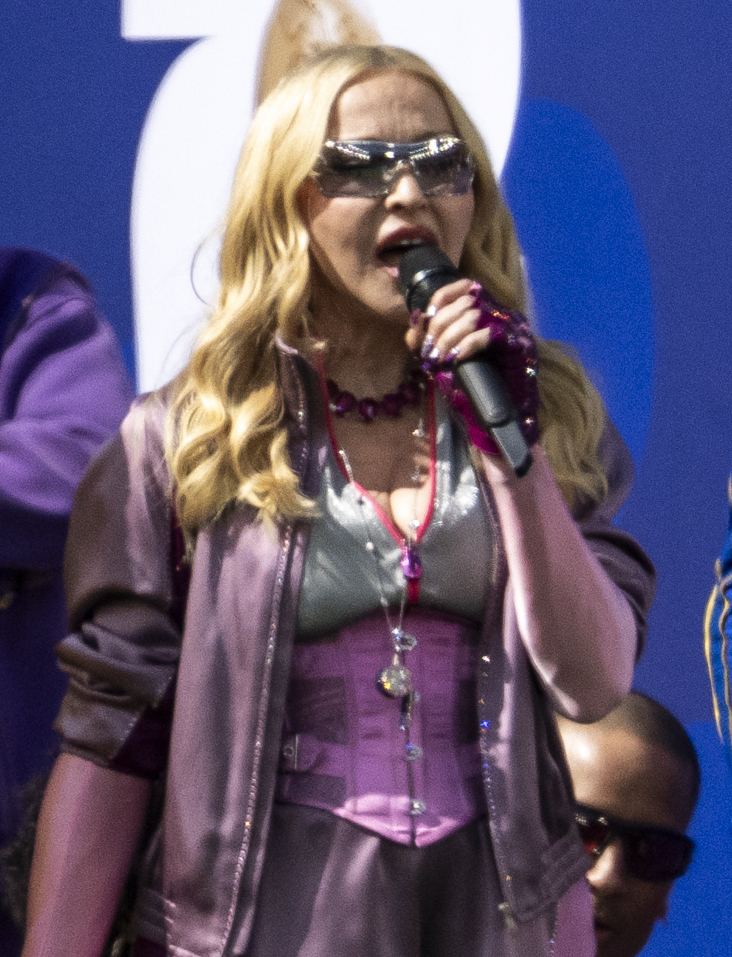
Madonna performing during the 2026 FIFA World Cup final halftime show, on which she interpolated elements of "Danceteria."

Madonna announced her fifteenth studio album, Confessions II, on April 15, 2026. Produced by Stuart Price, the album serves as a sequel to Confessions on a Dance Floor (2005). On May 14, 2026, the track list for the album had appeared on posters in major global cities, containing 12 tracks, including "Danceteria."

The shortened version of "Danceteria" was included in the short musical film Confessions II, released on June 5, 2026. The scene which features the song is set at the nightclub bathroom. Madonna is wearing a body-skimming Dolce & Gabbana dress, inspired by a silhouette from the spring 1998 collection. Renan Botehlo of Women's Wear Daily compared her look to the cover of her 1998 album Ray of Light. The scene features cameo appearances by multiple celebrities: actors Debi Mazar (who is mentioned in the song), Benedict Cumberbatch, Richard E. Grant, Odessa A'zion and Gwendoline Christie, model Kate Moss, musicians Shygirl, Arca and Honey Dijon, performance artist Prince Lyons, as well as soccer players João Pedro and Cole Palmer. It includes a shot of Madonna lifting her arm over a dryer, referrencing her scene from the 1985 film Desperately Seeking Susan and the music video of "Into the Groove." On July 6, 2026, Madonna released a behind the scenes short film of the making of the video.

On June 23, 2026, Madonna and Price played the song during the private party Club Confessions at the Paradis Latin in Paris. On July 10, 2026, it was sent to radio in Italy as a single. On August 21, 2026, the Harry Romero remix was released.

== Composition ==
"Danceteria" is a disco, electroclash and French house song. The Arts Desk's Thomas H. Green described it as a "euphoric filter-disco-house chunker," noting that Madonna raps and "sings with unalloyed nostalgic enthusiasm." The Irish Times's Ed Power pointed out a "crunchy house bassline." Pitchfork's Shaad D'Souza noted its "split-second rocksteady break." Spencer Kornhaber of The Atlantic pointed out the arrangement shape-shifts, including a hip-hop break and an acid house strobe. Lindsay Zoladz from The New York Times felt it "shape-shifts like an especially kinetic D.J. set." Joe Lynch from Billboard compared the rhythm to the series of 1980s compilation albums Ultimate Breaks and Beats.

"Danceteria"
A sample of the song's chorus, featuring the track's disco composition.

In the song, Madonna mentions people from the 1980s New York City downtown scene, including Martin Burgoyne, Haoui Montaug, Debi Mazar, Maripol, Fab Five Freddy, Jean-Michel Basquiat, Keith Haring, David Byrne, Nile Rodgers, Kenny Scharf, Tony Shafrazi, the B-52s and Rock Steady Crew, concluding: "Everyone here is a work of art." When she mentions asking Mark Kamins to play her song "Everybody," its hook is echoing in the background. The lyrics received comparisons to the spoken section from Madonna's 1990 song "Vogue," in which she lists Hollywood stars. Green compared her rap to Debbie Harry's vocal performance on Blondie's 1980 song "Rapture." Lynch felt Madonna was in "an unusually nostalgic (and literal) mood" and compared the tribute to New York City nightclub to her 2005 song "I Love New York" from Confessions on a Dance Floor. Mark Savage from BBC News called the song "a sweat-soaked strut through" Danceteria. Eric Henderson of Slant Magazine described it as "Madonna's own origin story," calling her a "valedictorian hijacking the mic at her own class reunion." The Independent's Roisin O'Connor deemed it "an ode to Eighties hedonism." Sam Rosenberg of Paste felt it was a celebration of "the fluidity and individuality of those around you." Zoladz called it a "New York history lesson disguised as a dance-floor anthem."

== Critical reception ==
Savage from BBC News, Jeff Nelson from People, Lucy O'Brien from Mojo and Rosenberg of Paste called "Danceteria" the album's highlight. Rosenberg called it Madonna's "freshest, most debaucherous song in what feels like forever." Zoladz of The New York Times opined that Madonna sounded "fresher and more alive" than she had in years. Savage deemed it "a thrilling evocation of 1980s New York," while The Arts Desk's Green called it an "immediate stand-out." Nelson described it as "the most purely joyful song she's released in years," adding that "the self-referential nods are satisfying, never forced." Pitchfork's Shaad D'Souza called it "extraordinarily fun" and described its frenzied energy as evocative of a first club experience, while noting that it marked new territory for Madonna. Henderson of Slant Magazine felt that the song "works better in context than it has any right to."

John Murphy of musicOMH called it "brilliant," adding: "Looking back has never felt so exhilarating." Nick Levine of NME called it "a thrilling tribute to the New York nightclub," while The Irish Times's Ed Power described it as "an affecting oral history." Rob Sheffield of Rolling Stone called it "one of the album's most delightful disco trips." The Daily Telegraph's Neil McCormick called it the album's "epic centrepiece." However, he noted it "exposes how prosaic her lyrics often are" and criticized the "forced" rhymes.

== "Danceteria Afterhours" ==
"Danceteria Afterhours"

Single by Madonna and Charli XCX
- Released: September 24, 2026
- Length: 3:50
- Label: Warner
- Songwriters: Madonna; Andrew Watt; Charlotte Aitchison; Henry Walter; Jeremiah Patrick Lordan; Lou Reed; Stuart Price
- Producers: Madonna; Andrew Watt; Cirkut; Stuart Price

Madonna singles chronology
"Love Sensation (Afterhours Mix)" (2026)	"Danceteria Afterhours" (2026)

Charli XCX singles chronology
"Camera" (2026)	"Danceteria Afterhours" (2026)

Lyric video
- "Danceteria Afterhours" on YouTube

In May 2026, Madonna wrote on social media: "If your Dance floor feels dead, maybe you're playing the wrong music," referring to lyrics from Charli XCX's 2026 song "Rock Music". On June 23, 2026, Charli XCX appeared onstage during Madonna's Club Confessions party at the Paradis Latin in Paris. However, she denied working on a new song together when asked by Nick Grimshaw during the BBC Radio 6 Music interview.

On September 19, 2026, the singers announced a remix of "Danceteria", called "Danceteria Afterhours", marking their first musical collaboration. In the press release, it was described as "a celebration of the fearless beginnings and influences that shaped each artist's singular paths". Simultaneously, the preorder of three versions of the CD single started. The song was released on September 24, 2026. On the following day, it was sent to radio in Italy as a single.

It includes a new second verse from Charli XCX, who recounts her own club history, including underground raves during her teenage years, DJing in London at the age of 15 and going to Los Angeles in 2015. She mentions musicians A. G. Cook and Sophie, and references using Myspace. According to Paolo Ragusa of Consequence, both performers are linking up "for a final cathartic chorus". Anja Stanković of Vogue Adria described the song: "Two autobiographical stories met in the same song, each with its own clubs, collaborators and people without whom their music would not sound the same today." Charisma Madarang of Rolling Stone opined that "each verse [was] simultaneously nostalgic and timeless".

== Commercial performance ==
"Danceteria" debuted at number 126 on the Billboard Global 200, becoming Madonna's fourth entry in the chart's history. In the United States, it entered at number 13 on the Bubbling Under Hot 100. In the week of October 3, 2026, it topped the Dance Airplay chart, becoming the third song from Confessions II to do so. In the United Kingdom, it debuted at number 38 on the UK singles chart, earning 11,124 units equivalent sales in its first week. The track became Madonna's seventy-fourth top forty entry on the chart. Upon the release of the remix with Charli XCX, it re-entered the UK singles chart at number 22.

== Accolades ==
Awards and nominations
Award	Date	Category	Result	Ref.
Grammy Awards	February 7, 2027	Best Dance Pop Recording	Pending	

== Live performances ==
On July 19, 2026, Madonna included elements of the song in her performance of "Music" during the 2026 FIFA World Cup final halftime show. On September 27, 2026, she opened the 2026 MTV Video Music Awards with the medley of "Bring Your Love" with Sabrina Carpenter and "Danceteria Afterhours" with Charli XCX, marking her first performance on the VMA since 2003. The segment of the second song recreated the scene of "Danceteria" from the Confessions II film, crafted after the restrooms in the 1980s New York City nightclub. It included cameo appearances by Debi Mazar, Julia Garner, Fab Five Freddy, Tony Ward, Sombr, Seth Rogen and the song's co-writer Andrew Watt stylized as Keith Haring. The bathroom wall featured Lou Reed's photo from the cover of his 1972 album Transformer. During the performance, Charli XCX stroked the bathroom hand dryer, referring Madonna's scene from the 1985 film Desperately Seeking Susan. Anja Stanković of Vogue Adria felt that "Madonna brought back Danceteria and downtown New York, while Charli brought her own creative circle into that setting". Rob Sheffield of Rolling Stone called the medley "one of the most stunning performances in the entire history of the VMAs", highlighting "Danceteria Afterhours" as "so emotional, so deeply personal, so elegiac, yet without sacrificing any of the disco sleaze or body-electric jubilation".

== Formats and track listings ==
Digital download / streaming (Harry Romero Remix)
No.	Title	Length
1.	"Danceteria" (Harry Romero Remix)	7:07
2.	"Danceteria"	3:55
Total length:		11:02

Digital download / streaming ("Danceteria Afterhours")
No.	Title	Length
1.	"Danceteria Afterhours" (with Charli XCX)	3:50
Total length:		3:50

CD single
No.	Title	Length
1.	"Danceteria Afterhours" (with Charli XCX)	3:50
2.	"Danceteria" (Harry Romero Remix)	7:07
3.	"Danceteria"	3:55
Total length:		14:52

== Credits and personnel ==
The credits are adapted from Madonna's official website and Tidal.

- Madonna – vocals, songwriting, producer
- Andrew Watt – songwriting, producer, guitar, keyboards, bass
- Cirkut – songwriting, producer, keyboards, programming
- Stuart Price – songwriting, producer, additional programming, additional keyboards, engineering, mixing
- Jerry Lordan – songwriting
- Ruairi O'Flaherty – mastering
- Miles Showell – vinyl master cut

Recorded and mixed at Start Here (London). Mastered at Sterling Sound (Los Angeles). Vinyl master cut at Abbey Road Studios (London).

== Charts ==
=== Weekly charts ===
Weekly chart performance for "Danceteria"
Chart (2026)	Peak position
Argentina Hot 100 (Billboard)	95
Argentina Airplay (Monitor Latino)	7
Australia Club Tracks (ARIA)	38
Australia Dance (ARIA)	9
Belgium (Ultratop 50 Wallonia)	47
Bolivia Airplay (Monitor Latino)	4
Brazil Airplay (Top 100 Brasil)	79
Canada Hot 100 (Billboard)	93
Chile Airplay (Monitor Latino)	11
Croatia International Airplay (Top lista)	24
Estonia Airplay (TopHit)	79
Finland Airplay (Radiosoittolista)	92
Global 200 (Billboard)	126
Greece International (IFPI)	55
Honduras Anglo Airplay (Monitor Latino)	4
Ireland (IRMA)	71
Italy Airplay (EarOne)	1
Japan Hot Overseas (Billboard Japan)	18
Latin America Anglo Airplay (Monitor Latino)	12
Latvia Airplay (TopHit)	16
Lithuania Airplay (TopHit)	35
Mexico Anglo Airplay (Monitor Latino)	4
New Zealand Hot Singles (RMNZ)	3
Nicaragua Anglo Airplay (Monitor Latino)	1
North Macedonia Airplay (Radiomonitor)	15
Portugal (AFP)	126
Portugal Airplay (AFP)	42
San Marino Airplay (SMRTV Top 50)	1
Serbia Airplay (Radiomonitor)	2
Slovakia Airplay (ČNS IFPI)	60
UK Singles (Official Charts)	22
US Bubbling Under Hot 100 (Billboard)	13
US Dance Airplay (Billboard)	1
US Hot Dance/Pop Songs (Billboard)	9
Venezuela Anglo Airplay (Monitor Latino)	13

Weekly chart performance for "Danceteria (Afterhours Mix)"
Chart (2026)	Peak position
Australia Dance (ARIA)	20
Chile Anglo Airplay (Monitor Latino)	10
Japan Hot Overseas (Billboard Japan)	9
Netherlands (Single Tip)	22
New Zealand Hot Singles (RMNZ)	14
Slovakia Airplay (ČNS IFPI)	94

=== Monthly charts ===
Monthly chart performance for "Danceteria"
Chart (2026)	Peak position
Latvia Airplay (TopHit)	39
Lithuania Airplay (TopHit)	36

== Release history ==
Release history and formats
Region	Date	Format(s)	Version	Label	Ref.
Italy	July 10, 2026	Radio airplay	Original	Warner	
Various	August 21, 2026	Digital download; streaming	Harry Romero remix	Warner	
Various	September 24, 2026	Digital download; streaming	"Danceteria Afterhours"	Warner	
Italy	September 25, 2026	Radio airplay	"Danceteria Afterhours"	Warner	
Various	November 2026	CD (Note: To be released in three versions: United States edition, United Kingdom edition and international edition.)	"Danceteria Afterhours"; Harry Romero remix; original	Warner	

== See also ==
- List of Billboard number-one dance songs of 2026
