= Break Up in Reverse =

2026 single by Teddy Swims

Single by Teddy Swims

from the album Ugly
- Released: July 10, 2026
- Length: 3:25
- Label: Warner
- Songwriters: Jaten Dimsdale; John Ryan; Julian Bunetta; Matt Zara; Mikky Ekko
- Producers: Tommy King; Bunetta; Ryan; Zara

Teddy Swims singles chronology
"Mr. Know It All" (2026)	"Break Up in Reverse" (2026)	"Perfect Man" (2026)

Music video
- "Break Up in Reverse" on YouTube

"Break Up in Reverse" is a song by American singer-songwriter Teddy Swims. A track based on his breakup with Raiche Wright, it was written by Swims himself alongside John Ryan, Julian Bunetta, Matt Zara, and Mikky Ekko, and was released on July 10, 2026, through Warner as the second single for Swims' upcoming third studio album Ugly (2027).

== Background and composition ==
"Break Up in Reverse" is a track about the end of Swims' relationship with Raiche Wright. Swims and Wright began dating in 2024 and had a son together on June 23, 2025. Swims initially mentioned the separation in April 2026 during a question and answer session at the Stagecoach Festival. He later confirmed the split following a press release for the song issued by Warner Records.

Swims wrote the track in collaboration with John Ryan, Julian Bunetta, Matt Zara, Mikky Ekko and Tommy King. According to Swims, the track's structure was inspired by the 2001 song "Rewind" by rapper Nas, which tells a story in reverse. Swims adapted this concept to his relationship, writing lyrics about wishing to "undo a failed relationship". The song's instrumentation begins with an acoustic guitar and builds up to a chorus that serves as the song's "true statement of intent". The second verse of the track also references Massachusetts, which is Wright's home state.

== Release and music video ==
The song was officially released as a single on July 10, 2026, through Warner. An accompanying music video was later released on Swims' official YouTube channel. The music video, directed by Lewis Cater, reflects the backwards theme of the lyrics. The video starts with Swims standing in front of a pile of rubble. As he sings, a bulldozer operates in reverse to reconstruct the debris into a furnished room. The space is populated with items including photographs, baby toys, puzzle pieces, and kintsugi pottery.

== Promotion ==
"Break Up in Reverse" was released during Swims' summer touring schedule, which included European festival appearances at NOS Alive, Gurtenfestival, Electric Castle, Colours of Ostrava, Lollapalooza Berlin, and Latitude Festival, alongside two dates at the Scarborough Open Air Theatre. In the United States, Swims had previously performed at Coachella, Stagecoach, BottleRock, and Bonnaroo. The song also preceded his North American arena tour, titled the Ugly Tour, scheduled to run from September through November 2026.

== Credits and personnel ==
Credits are adapted via Tidal.

=== Musicians ===
- Teddy Swims – lead vocals
- Julian Bunetta – programming, drums, guitar, bass
- Matt Zara – programming, drums, guitar, keyboards
- Tommy King – programming, drums, keyboards
- John Ryan – guitar, keyboards

=== Technical ===
- Nathan Dantzler – mastering
- Alex Ghenea – mixing
- Jeff Gunnell – engineering
- Julian Bunetta – engineering
- Matt Zara – engineering
- Harrison Tate – mastering assistance
- Jack Normile – mixing assistance

== Charts ==
Chart performance for "Break Up in Reverse"
Chart (2026)	Peak position
Belgium (Ultratop 50 Flanders)	35
Bolivia Anglo Airplay (Monitor Latino)	12
Croatia International Airplay (Top lista)	41
Czech Republic Airplay (ČNS IFPI)	45
Netherlands (Dutch Top 40)	33
Netherlands Airplay (Dutch Charts)	21
New Zealand Hot Singles (RMNZ)	2
UK Singles Sales (Official Charts)	32

== Release history ==
Release dates and formats for "Break Up in Reverse"
Region	Date	Format(s)	Version	Label	Ref.
Various	July 10, 2026	Digital download; streaming	Original	Warner	
Italy	July 17, 2026	Radio airplay	Original	Warner	
