= Love Sensation (Madonna song) =

2026 song by Madonna

- Remix bundle artwork

Single by Madonna

from the album Confessions II
- Released: June 4, 2026
- Studio: Start Here (London)
- Genre: House; disco
- Length: 3:47
- Label: Warner
- Songwriters: Madonna Ciccone; Stuart Price
- Producers: Madonna; Stuart Price

Madonna singles chronology
"Bring Your Love" (2026)	"Love Sensation" (2026)	"Danceteria" (2026)

Visualizer video
- "Love Sensation" on YouTube

"Love Sensation" is a song by the American singer Madonna from her fifteenth studio album, Confessions II (2026). It was released on June 4, 2026, through Warner Records, as the second single from the album. It was written and produced by Madonna and Stuart Price. It is a house and disco song about the healing power of love. A remix with Australian singer Kylie Minogue was released on August 6, 2026.

The song received generally positive reviews from music critics. The remix with Minogue reached number eight on the UK singles chart, becoming Madonna's highest entry in 17 years. It was nominated for Best Remixed Recording at the 69th Annual Grammy Awards.

== Background and release ==
Madonna announced her fifteenth studio album, Confessions II, on April 15, 2026. Produced by Stuart Price, the album serves as a sequel to Confessions on a Dance Floor (2005). On April 24, she and Price hosted a private Club Confessions party at the Abbey in West Hollywood, California, previewing two songs from the album, with one of them being "Love Sensation". For the show, they edited the song to have an extended breakdown; afterwards, they decided to include it in the studio version.

In May 2026, the track list for the album had appeared on Spotify, revealing the song's placement as track eight. It was omitted on 12-song physical editions. "Love Sensation" was released as the album's second promotional single on June 4, 2026. On July 15, 2026, the single with remixes by Salute and Floorplan was released digitally.

== Composition ==
"Love Sensation"
A sample of the song's chorus and bridge, featuring pulsating electronica and house beats, and lyrics about love's healing power.

"Love Sensation" is a house and disco song. Travis Bland from Consequence described it as "pulsating electronica." Liberty Dunworth from NME called it "a club-ready anthem" with "a thumping electronic beat, ramping up towards a euphoric chorus." Joe Lynch from Billboard noted its "indie disco flavor", comparing it to the dance music circa 2008. Mark Savage from BBC pointed out the similarities to the work of Daft Punk and Stardust. Eric Henderson of Slant Magazine called it a "baldly euphoric moment" and compared it to the work of Kylie Minogue. John Murphy of musicOMH compared its "euphoric house-infused" energy to the music of Loleatta Holloway.

The song's main theme is love and its healing power. It features Madonna repeating "There's nothing that we cannot do". She described it as "just joy".

== Critical reception ==
Travis Bland from Consequence wrote that the song "proves that Madonna is still a maestro of making people sweat on the dance floor with drops and builds ramping up to explosive moments and her voice being an avatar for the sensation of exuberance and catharsis in the club." Billboard's Joe Lynch described it as "an astoundingly strong tease of Confessions II." He called it "a perfect encapsulation of why Madonna and Stuart Price work so well together", noting "the throbbing beat that never feels forced". Liberty Dunworth from NME praised Madonna's "effortless" voice, while Robin Murray of Clash complimented her "fantastic vocal". Mark Savage from BBC called it a "big bouncy summer anthem". Alexis Petridis of The Guardian called the song "less distinguished" among the album and worthy of skipping.

== Afterhours Mix ==
"Love Sensation (Afterhours Mix)"

Single by Madonna and Kylie Minogue
- Released: August 6, 2026
- Length: 6:14
- Label: Warner
- Songwriters: Madonna Ciccone; Stuart Price
- Producers: Madonna; Stuart Price

Madonna singles chronology
"Danceteria" (2026)	"Love Sensation (Afterhours Mix)" (2026)	"Danceteria Afterhours" (2026)

Kylie Minogue singles chronology
"These Alarms" (2026)	"Love Sensation (Afterhours Mix)" (2026)

Lyric video
- "Love Sensation" (Afterhours Mix) on YouTube

In May 2026, a rumor about Madonna's collaboration with Kylie Minogue began circulating. However, Minogue denied it in an interview with Los Angeles Times, calling it "a random thing" and stating she was not featured on Confessions II. On June 26, 2026, BBC One aired the television special Madonna & Graham, in which Madonna was interviewed by Graham Norton and Minogue appeared as a guest. When Norton asked them if the rumors about their collaboration were true, they did not answer and Madonna added: "It's my job to be mysterious."

On August 3, 2026, following Madonna's and Minogue's performance at the Club Confessions show in Amsterdam, Billboard reported that their collaborative remix of "Love Sensation" would be released on August 7, 2026. On the same day, the singers announced that the remix would be released on August 6, 2026 at 3 p.m. ET. Simultaneously, the preorder of three versions of the CD single started, scheduled to be released in September 2026. The remix, subtitled "Afterhours mix" and produced by Price, marked Madonna's and Minogue's first studio collaboration. Minogue previously collaborated with Price on her 2010 album Aphrodite. On August 7, 2026, the song's lyric video was released.

=== Composition and critical reception ===
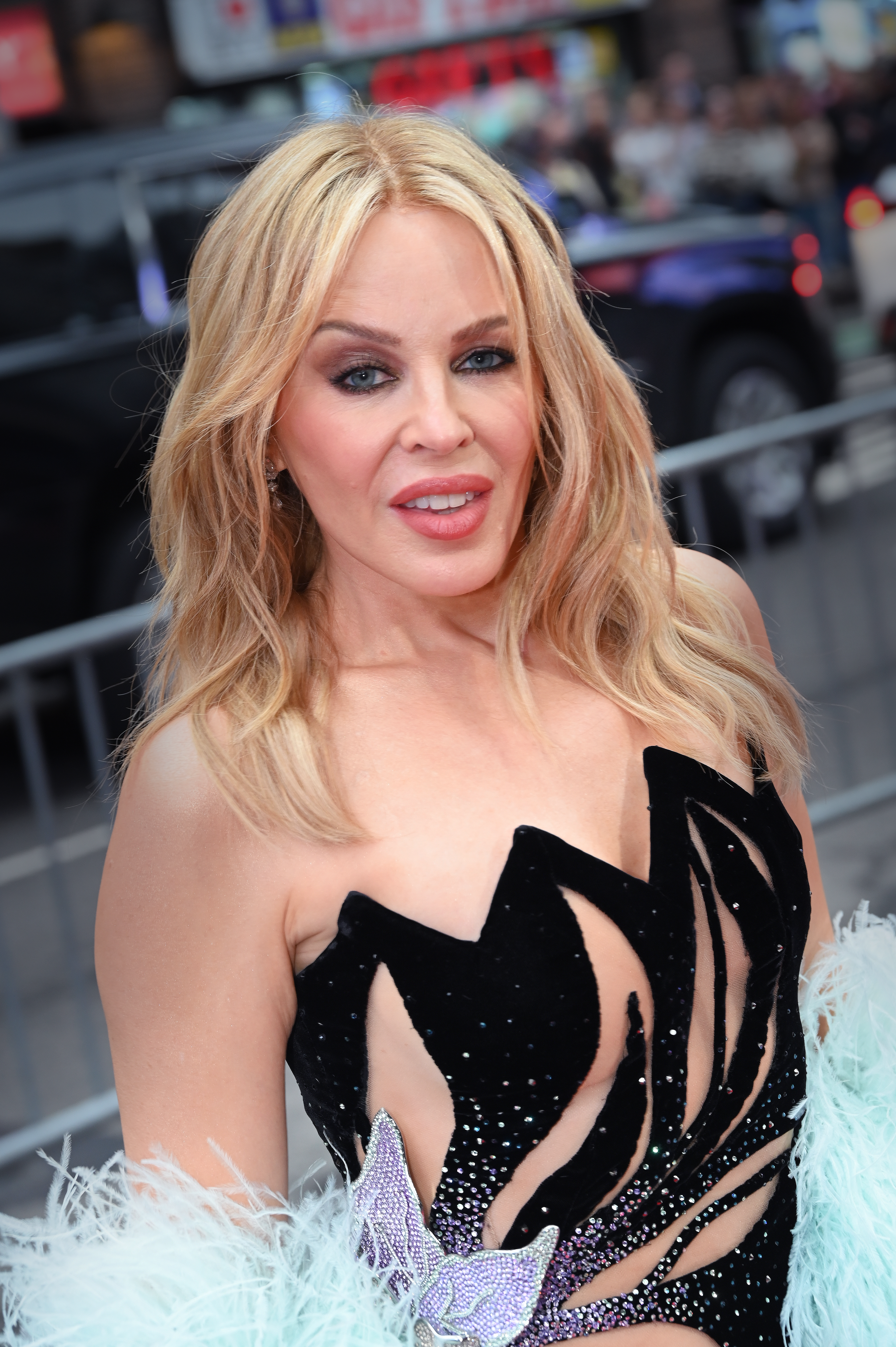
Kylie Minogue (pictured in 2025) appeared in the song's "Afterhours Mix".

The remix features Minogue's vocal in the second verse. Sal Cinquemani felt it "trades the squelchy French-disco bona fides" of the original version "for a sleeker electronic soundscape" and compared its hook to the work of Modjo. Bland opined it "ups the propulsion of the beat and gives a smoky dreaminess" to the song. According to Billboard's Katie Bain, the remix is a "significant departure from the original", starting with "a steamy, thumping build". It includes Madonna's extented vocal in the bridge, layering in Minogue's vocal. The remix features an extented outro with "increasingly urgent" percussion. The arrangement of its radio edit maintains more elements of the original version. Minogue's vocal harmonies are moved from the second verse to the bridge.

Bain opined that Minogue's verse "perfectly matches and compliments Madonna's vocal tone". Cinquemani called the collaboration a "royal consort" and deemed Minogue's vocal "silver-toned".

== Commercial performance ==
In the United States, "Love Sensation" topped the Dance Airplay chart in the week of August 8, 2026, becoming Madonna's ninth number one on the chart. She tied Ellie Goulding for the fifth-most number ones in the chart's history. In the United Kingdom, the single debuted at number 5 on the UK Singles Sales chart. After the release of the remix with Minogue, it entered the UK Singles Chart at number eight, becoming Madonna's highest-charting song since "Celebration" (2009). It was her 65th and Minogue's 37th top ten hit.

== Accolades ==
Awards and nominations
Award	Date	Work	Nominee	Category	Result	Ref.
Grammy Awards	February 7, 2027	"Love Sensation (Afterhours Mix)"	Stuart Price	Best Remixed Recording	Pending	

== Live performances ==
On June 4, 2026, Madonna performed the song for the first time during the surprise, free Pride Month concert at the Square in Times Square, produced and live streamed by Grindr. On August 1, 2026, Madonna and Minogue premiered their collaborative remix during the Club Confessions promotional show, which was held at the AFAS Live in Amsterdam as a part of WorldPride during the Pride Amsterdam.

== Formats and track listings ==
Digital download / streaming
No.	Title	Length
1.	"Love Sensation" (Radio Edit)	3:02
2.	"Love Sensation"	3:47
Total length:		6:49

Digital download / streaming (Remixes)
No.	Title	Length
1.	"Love Sensation" (Floorplan Mix)	5:27
2.	"Love Sensation" (salute's infinite passion remix)	5:57
3.	"Love Sensation"	3:47
Total length:		15:11

Digital download / streaming / CD single (Afterhours remixes)
No.	Title	Length
1.	"Love Sensation" (Afterhours Mix) (with Kylie Minogue)	6:14
2.	"Love Sensation" (Afterhours Radio Edit) (with Kylie Minogue)	3:35
3.	"Love Sensation"	3:47
Total length:		13:36

7-inch single
No.	Title	Length
1.	"Love Sensation" (Afterhours 7" Mix)	3:53
2.	"Love Sensation" (Afterhours Radio Edit)	3:35
Total length:		7:28

== Credits and personnel ==
The credits are adapted from Madonna's official website and Tidal.

- Madonna – lead vocals, songwriting, production
- Stuart Price – backing vocals, songwriting, production, keyboards, bass, drum programming, mixing, recording engineer
- Ruairi O'Flaherty – mastering
- Miles Showell – vinyl master cut

Recorded and mixed at Start Here (London). Mastered at Sterling Sound (Los Angeles). Vinyl master cut at Abbey Road Studios (London).

== Charts ==
=== Weekly charts ===
Weekly chart performance for "Love Sensation"
Chart (2026)	Peak position
Chile Anglo Airplay (Monitor Latino)	11
Global Dance Radio (Billboard/WARM)	35
Italy Dance Airplay (EarOne)	61
Japan Download Songs (Billboard Japan)	75
Japan Hot Overseas (Billboard Japan)	17
Kazakhstan Airplay (TopHit)	45
Latvia Airplay (TopHit)	13
New Zealand Hot Singles (RMNZ)	23
North Macedonia Airplay (Radiomonitor)	11
UK Singles (Official Charts)	8
UK Pop Club (Music Week)	1
Uruguay Anglo Airplay (Monitor Latino)	10
US Digital Song Sales (Billboard)	2
US Dance Airplay (Billboard)	1
US Hot Dance/Pop Songs (Billboard)	9

Weekly chart performance for "Love Sensation (Afterhours Mix)"
Chart (2026)	Peak position
Australia (ARIA)	61
Australia Club Tracks (ARIA)	34
Australia Dance Singles (ARIA)	1
Chile Anglo Airplay (Monitor Latino)	11
Croatia International Airplay (Top lista)	42
Croatian International Albums (HDU) 7-inch vinyl	32
Netherlands (Single Top 100)	88
New Zealand Hot Singles (RMNZ)	38

=== Monthly charts ===
Monthly chart performance
Chart (2026)	Peak position
Kazakhstan Airplay (TopHit)	86
Latvia Airplay (TopHit)	18

== Release history ==
Release dates and formats
Region	Date	Format(s)	Version(s)	Label	Ref.
Various	June 4, 2026	Digital download; streaming	Original; radio edit	Warner	
Italy	June 5, 2026	Radio airplay	Original	Warner	
Various	July 15, 2026	Digital download; streaming	Floorplan remix; Salute's Infinite Passion remix	Warner	
Various	August 6, 2026	Digital download; streaming	Afterhours mix; Afterhours radio edit; original	Warner	
Various	September 2026	CD (Note: To be released in three versions: United States edition, United Kingdom edition and Australia edition.)	Afterhours mix; Afterhours radio edit; original	Warner	
Various	September 2026	7" vinyl	Afterhours mix; Afterhours radio edit	Warner	

== See also ==
- List of Billboard number-one dance songs of 2026
- List of UK top-ten singles in 2026
