= List of Billboard number-one dance songs of 2026 =

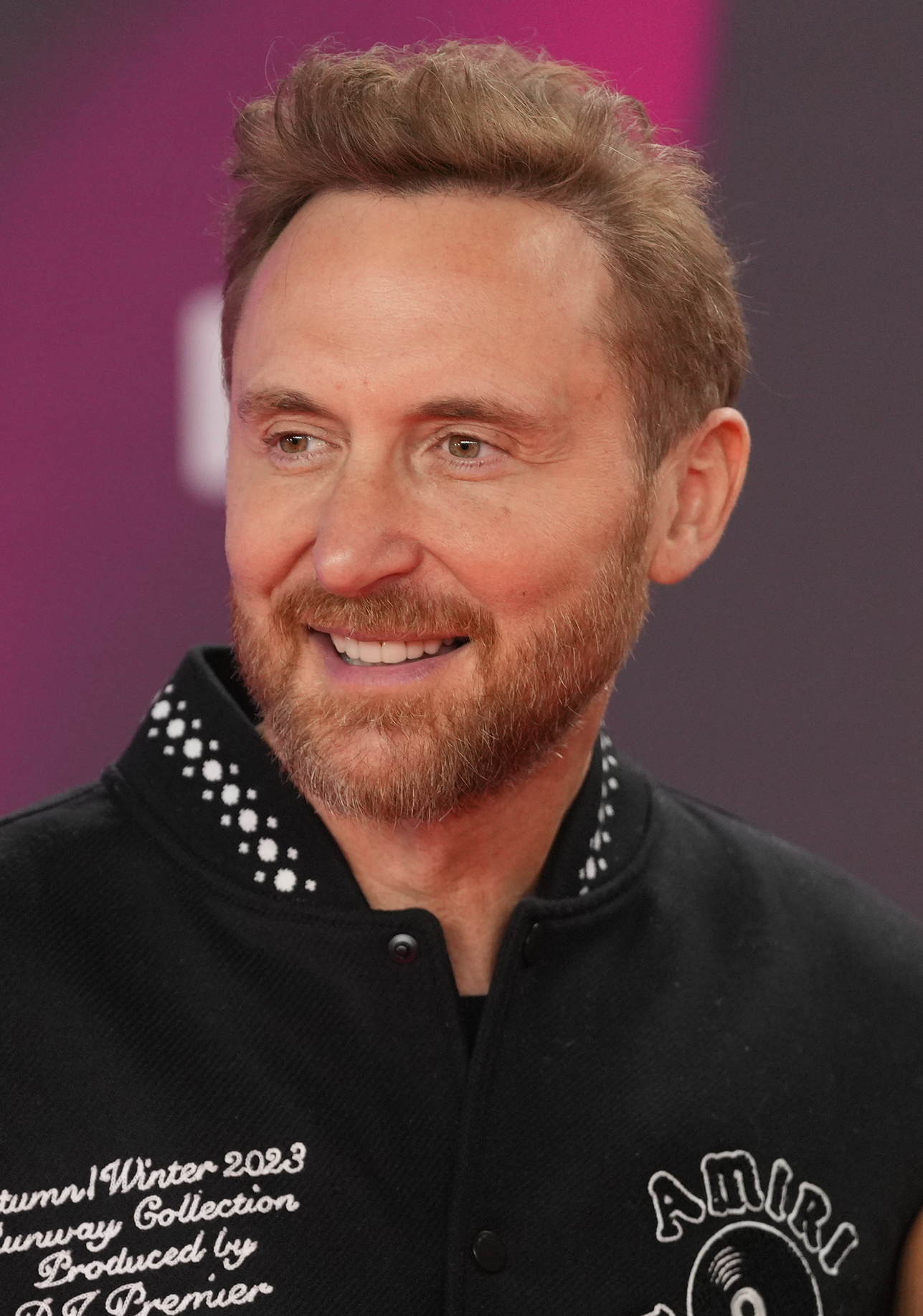
David Guetta topped the Dance/Mix Show Airplay with three songs in 2026, extending his record as the artist with the most number ones on the chart

Billboard magazine compiled the top-performing dance songs in the United States during 2026 on three main charts: the Hot Dance/Electronic Songs, the Hot Dance/Pop Songs, and the Dance/Mix Show Airplay. The Dance/Mix Show Airplay was first published in 2003, ranking songs based on airplay detections on dance radio, as well as mix-show plays on top 40 radio and select rhythmic radio as measured by Mediabase. Both the Hot Dance/Electronic Songs and the Hot Dance/Pop Songs are multi-metric charts, ranking songs based on streaming and sales as tracked by Luminate, as well as airplay audience impressions from radio stations of all formats as measured by Mediabase. First published in 2013, the Hot Dance/Electronic Songs was revamped in January 2025, to focus on songs primarily recorded by DJs or producers, with an emphasis on electronic-based production. As a result, the Hot Dance/Pop Songs chart was created to compile songs with "dance-centric vocals, melody, and hooks by artists not rooted in the dance genre".

"No Broke Boys" by Disco Lines and Tinashe completed its 24 non-consecutive weeks at number one on the Hot Dance/Electronic Songs on February 14, before being replaced by Jennie's remix of "Dracula" by Tame Impala. Meanwhile, "How It's Done" by Huntrix singers Ejae, Audrey Nuna and Rei Ami ended its 29 consecutive weeks atop the Hot Dance/Pop Songs on January 24. Other number ones on the chart were "Stateside" by PinkPantheress and Zara Larsson, "Aperture" by Harry Styles, and "Midnight Sun" by Larsson.

"Aperture" and "Midnight Sun" also reigned both the Hot Dance/Pop chart and the airplay chart. DJ David Guetta had three chart-toppers on the Dance/Mix Show Airplay chart, including "Gone Gone Gone" (with Teddy Swims and Tones and I) and "Save Me Tonight" (with Jennifer Lopez), extending his record as the artist with the most number-one songs on the chart with 22. "Save Me Tonight" also became Lopez's first dance airplay number one in since "On the Floor" in 2011. Meanwhile, Madonna had three number one songs on the airplay chart with "I Feel So Free", "Love Sensation" and "Danceteria", marking her first dance airplay number ones since "Miles Away" in 2008.

== Chart history ==
Chart history
Issue date	Hot Dance/Electronic Songs			Hot Dance/Pop Songs			Dance/Mix Show Airplay		
Issue date	Song	Artist(s)	Ref.	Song	Artist(s)	Ref.	Song	Artist(s)	Ref.
January 3	"No Broke Boys"	Disco Lines and Tinashe		"How It's Done"	Huntrix: Ejae, Audrey Nuna and Rei Ami		"Cry for You"	Sidepiece	
January 10	"No Broke Boys"	Disco Lines and Tinashe		"How It's Done"	Huntrix: Ejae, Audrey Nuna and Rei Ami		"Set Me Free"	Armin van Buuren and Sacha	
January 17	"No Broke Boys"	Disco Lines and Tinashe		"How It's Done"	Huntrix: Ejae, Audrey Nuna and Rei Ami		"Gone Gone Gone"	David Guetta, Teddy Swims, and Tones and I	
January 24	"No Broke Boys"	Disco Lines and Tinashe		"How It's Done"	Huntrix: Ejae, Audrey Nuna and Rei Ami		"Gone Gone Gone"	David Guetta, Teddy Swims, and Tones and I	
January 31	"No Broke Boys"	Disco Lines and Tinashe		"Stateside"	PinkPantheress and Zara Larsson		"Gone Gone Gone"	David Guetta, Teddy Swims, and Tones and I	
February 7	"No Broke Boys"	Disco Lines and Tinashe		"Aperture"	Harry Styles		"DNCR"	Kaskade	
February 14	"No Broke Boys"	Disco Lines and Tinashe		"Aperture"	Harry Styles		"Don't Blame Me"	James Carter	
February 21	"Dracula (Jennie remix)"	Tame Impala and Jennie		"Aperture"	Harry Styles		"I Run"	Haven featuring Kaitlin Aragon	
February 28	"Dracula (Jennie remix)"	Tame Impala and Jennie		"Aperture"	Harry Styles		"Midnight Sun"	Zara Larsson	
March 7	"Dracula (Jennie remix)"	Tame Impala and Jennie		"Stateside"	PinkPantheress and Zara Larsson		"Love You for Life"	Loud Luxury and Emily Roberts	
March 14	"Dracula (Jennie remix)"	Tame Impala and Jennie		"Stateside"	PinkPantheress and Zara Larsson		"Midnight Sun"	Zara Larsson	
March 21	"Dracula (Jennie remix)"	Tame Impala and Jennie		"Stateside"	PinkPantheress and Zara Larsson		"Midnight Sun"	Zara Larsson	
March 28	"Dracula (Jennie remix)"	Tame Impala and Jennie		"Stateside"	PinkPantheress and Zara Larsson		"Aperture"	Harry Styles	
April 4	"Dracula (Jennie remix)"	Tame Impala and Jennie		"Stateside"	PinkPantheress and Zara Larsson		"What Love Can Do"	Bonnie X Clyde	
April 11	"Dracula (Jennie remix)"	Tame Impala and Jennie		"Stateside"	PinkPantheress and Zara Larsson		"I Think I'm Addicted"	Oskar med k featuring Haley Joelle	
April 18	"Dracula (Jennie remix)"	Tame Impala and Jennie		"Stateside"	PinkPantheress and Zara Larsson		"Don't Want Your Love"	Illenium and Ellie Goulding	
April 25	"Dracula (Jennie remix)"	Tame Impala and Jennie		"Stateside"	PinkPantheress and Zara Larsson		"Don't Want Your Love"	Illenium and Ellie Goulding	
May 2	"Dracula (Jennie remix)"	Tame Impala and Jennie		"Stateside"	PinkPantheress and Zara Larsson		"Save Me Tonight"	Jennifer Lopez and David Guetta	
May 9	"Dracula (Jennie remix)"	Tame Impala and Jennie		"Stateside"	PinkPantheress and Zara Larsson		"New Religion"	Bebe Rexha and Faithless	
May 16	"Dracula (Jennie remix)"	Tame Impala and Jennie		"Stateside"	PinkPantheress and Zara Larsson		"Neck"	Mau P	
May 23	"Dracula (Jennie remix)"	Tame Impala and Jennie		"Stateside"	PinkPantheress and Zara Larsson		"Sun Shines on Me"	Armin van Buuren and Glockenbach	
May 30	"Dracula (Jennie remix)"	Tame Impala and Jennie		"Stateside"	PinkPantheress and Zara Larsson		"I Feel So Free"	Madonna	
June 6	"Dracula (Jennie remix)"	Tame Impala and Jennie		"Stateside"	PinkPantheress and Zara Larsson		"Favour"	Fisher and Tones and I	
June 13	"Dracula (Jennie remix)"	Tame Impala and Jennie		"Stateside"	PinkPantheress and Zara Larsson		"Save My Love"	Kygo, Khalid and Gryffin	
June 20	"Dracula (Jennie remix)"	Tame Impala and Jennie		"Stateside"	PinkPantheress and Zara Larsson		"Beautiful Places"	Tiësto and Brieanna Grace	
June 27	"Dracula (Jennie remix)"	Tame Impala and Jennie		"Stateside"	PinkPantheress and Zara Larsson		"Don't Wanna Go Home"	Meduza and Henry Camamile	
July 4	"Dracula (Jennie remix)"	Tame Impala and Jennie		"Stateside"	PinkPantheress and Zara Larsson		"Satisfy"	Calvin Harris and Jazzy	
July 11	"Dracula (Jennie remix)"	Tame Impala and Jennie		"Stateside"	PinkPantheress and Zara Larsson		"Satisfy"	Calvin Harris and Jazzy	
July 18	"Dracula (Jennie remix)"	Tame Impala and Jennie		"Midnight Sun"	Zara Larsson		"I Need U"	Bunt and Malou	
July 25	"Dracula (Jennie remix)"	Tame Impala and Jennie		"Midnight Sun"	Zara Larsson		"House Boy"	Aluna, Will Sass and Timbaland	
August 1	"Dracula (Jennie remix)"	Tame Impala and Jennie		"Midnight Sun"	Zara Larsson		"Echo"	The Chainsmokers and Oaks	
August 8	"Dracula (Jennie remix)"	Tame Impala and Jennie		"Midnight Sun"	Zara Larsson		"Love Sensation"	Madonna	
August 15	"Dracula (Jennie remix)"	Tame Impala and Jennie		"Midnight Sun"	Zara Larsson		"Meet Again"	Kaskade, Layton Giordani and Natalie Jane	
August 22	"Dracula (Jennie remix)"	Tame Impala and Jennie		"Midnight Sun"	Zara Larsson		"Sad Girls"	Bebe Rexha and David Guetta	
August 29	"Dracula (Jennie remix)"	Tame Impala and Jennie		"Midnight Sun"	Zara Larsson		"Movin' to the Sun"	Hugel, Imael Angel and Ultra Naté	
September 5	"Dracula (Jennie remix)"	Tame Impala and Jennie		"Midnight Sun"	Zara Larsson		"Free Your Mind"	Prospa and Cloonee	
September 12	"Dracula (Jennie remix)"	Tame Impala and Jennie		"Midnight Sun"	Zara Larsson		"Free Your Mind"	Prospa and Cloonee	
September 19	"Dracula (Jennie remix)"	Tame Impala and Jennie		"Midnight Sun"	Zara Larsson		"Seratonin"	James Hype	
September 26	"Dracula (Jennie remix)"	Tame Impala and Jennie		"Midnight Sun"	Zara Larsson		"Lovers on the Dancefloor"	Blond:ish featuring Kurtis Wells	
October 3	"Dracula (Jennie remix)"	Tame Impala and Jennie		"Midnight Sun"	Zara Larsson		"Danceteria"	Madonna	
October 10	"Dracula (Jennie remix)"	Tame Impala and Jennie		"Midnight Sun"	Zara Larsson		"Silverlining"	Jex	
October 17	"Dracula (Jennie remix)"	Tame Impala and Jennie		"Midnight Sun"	Zara Larsson		"What a Life"	Fisher featuring Florence Arman	
October 24	"Dracula (Jennie remix)"	Tame Impala and Jennie		"Midnight Sun"	Zara Larsson		"Happiness is So Sad"	Swedish House Mafia	
October 31	"Dracula (Jennie remix)"	Tame Impala and Jennie		"Midnight Sun"	Zara Larsson		"World Away"	Gryffin featuring Bunt and Inez	
November 7	"Dracula (Jennie remix)"	Tame Impala and Jennie		"Midnight Sun"	Zara Larsson		"Silence"	Meduza and RANI	
November 14	"Dracula (Jennie remix)"	Tame Impala and Jennie		"Midnight Sun"	Zara Larsson		"Caught in the Fire"	GIELLE	

== See also ==
- 2026 in American music
- List of Billboard Hot 100 number ones of 2026
