= Gone Gone Gone (David Guetta, Teddy Swims and Tones and I song) =

2025 song by David Guetta, Teddy Swims and Tones and I

Single by David Guetta, Teddy Swims and Tones and I
- Released: 10 October 2025
- Genre: House; dance-pop
- Length: 3:18
- Label: What a DJ; Warner UK; Atlantic
- Songwriters: David Guetta; Jaten Collin Dimsdale; Toni Watson; Ben Kohn; Giorgio Tuinfort; Hector "Tor" Fernandez; Jack LaFrantz; Julian Bunetta; Naomi Robin; Yarden "Jordi" Peleg; Yuval Maayan
- Producers: David Guetta; Jordi

David Guetta singles chronology
"After You" (2025)	"Gone Gone Gone" (2025)	"Locked In" (2026)

Teddy Swims singles chronology
"You've Got Another Thing Coming" (2025)	"Gone Gone Gone" (2025)	"Mr. Know It All" (2026)

Tones and I singles chronology
"Hideaway" (2025)	"Gone Gone Gone" (2025)	"Favour" (2026)

Music video
- "Gone Gone Gone" on YouTube

"Gone Gone Gone" is a song by French DJ and music producer David Guetta, American singer-songwriter Teddy Swims and Australian singer-songwriter Tones and I, released as a single through What a DJ, under license of Warner Music UK, and Atlantic Records on 10 October 2025.

== Release ==
Marking the first collaboration between the artists, the song was released as a single through labels Atlantic Records and Warner Music. In discussing the collaboration, Guetta described the project as "a little bit of magic" and noted that both singers have highly soulful voices.

== Composition and lyrics ==
"Gone Gone Gone" is a house and dance-pop song that explores the intensity and volatility of a passionate relationship. Combining Guetta's dance production style with gospel-oriented soul and pop elements, the song starts with house keyboards and strings. The lyrics are about the complexities of toxic love, with Swims performing the line "We were fire, impossible to tame", and Tones and I singing "Had a good bad lovin' in my heart".

== Music video ==
The official music video for "Gone Gone Gone" premiered on YouTube on 22 October 2025. Filmed in June 2025, the video was shot in downtown Las Vegas, mainly around Fremont Street and the historic Plaza Hotel. Directed by a team led by David Guetta's in-house production crew, the storyline follows a young couple — portrayed by Brenna Monet Madding as Lola and Hunter Lance as Jett — on a wild trip through Las Vegas.

Scenes include visits to an unmarked bar where Swims appears drinking alone, a performance sequence featuring Guetta, Swims and Tones and I in the parking lot of the Desert Star Motel, and a wedding ceremony at the Viva Las Vegas Chapel. Several Elvis tribute artists, including Brendan Paul, Ron DeCar and Jason Marquez, make cameo appearances throughout the video.

According to the Las Vegas Review-Journal, filming took place the same night as scenes for the Apple TV+ series Margo's Got Money Troubles, with Plaza Hotel management adjusting the schedule to accommodate both productions. The Plaza Hotel, Golden Nugget, Golden Gate and Circa are among the Las Vegas landmarks featured in the video, described by the newspaper as "a straight-up Vegas" depiction of the city's nightlife and classic neon atmosphere.

== Live performance ==
On 22 October 2025, Teddy Swims and Tones and I performed "Gone Gone Gone" live for the first time together during Swims' concert at Rod Laver Arena in Melbourne, Australia. The performance occurred toward the end of the show and marked the first public rendition of the song. The concert was part of Swims' Melbourne tour, his first large-scale production at Rod Laver Arena with an estimated 40,000+ tickets sold over three nights. Tones and I joined Swims on stage mid-show, performing the song in front of the sold-out audience. The performance was described as well-received, with the audience responding enthusiastically to the collaborative track.

== Track listing ==
- Digital download and streaming
1. "Gone Gone Gone" – 3:18
2. "Gone Gone Gone" (extended) – 4:16
- Digital download and streaming – David Guetta remix
1. "Gone Gone Gone (Done Done Done)" (David Guetta remix) – 2:49
2. "Gone Gone Gone (Done Done Done)" (David Guetta remix extended) – 4:40

== Credits and personnel ==
Credits adapted from Tidal.

- David Guetta – production, composition, lyrics, programming
- Teddy Swims – composition, lyrics, vocals
- Tones and I – composition, lyrics, vocals
- Yarden "Jordi" Peleg – production, composition, lyrics, drums, keyboards, piano, programming, string arrangement
- Giorgio Tuinfort – composition, lyrics, brass, guitar, additional programming
- Ben Kohn – composition, lyrics
- Pete Kelleher – composition, lyrics
- Hector "Tor" Fernandez – composition, lyrics
- Jack LaFrantz – composition, lyrics
- Julian Bunetta – composition, lyrics
- Naomi Robin – composition, lyrics
- Yuval Maayan – composition, lyrics
- Allard Buwalda – saxophone
- Bar Markovich – viola, violin
- Bryce Bordone – engineering
- Chris Gehringer – mastering
- The Jayhorns – brass
- Jel Jongen – brass arrangement, trombone
- Karin Markovich – cello
- Peppe Folliero – additional mixing
- Pierre-Luc Rioux – guitar
- Serban Ghenea – mixing
- Serge Plume – trumpet
- Timofey Reznikov – additional production, programming
- (C) 2025 What A DJ Limited/Warner Bros UK Limited

== Charts ==
=== Weekly charts ===
Weekly chart performance for "Gone Gone Gone"
Chart (2025–2026)	Peak position
Argentina Anglo Airplay (Monitor Latino)	5
Australia (ARIA)	85
Australia Dance (ARIA)	4
Austria Airplay (IFPI)	2
Belarus Airplay (TopHit)	13
Belgium (Ultratop 50 Flanders)	5
Belgium (Ultratop 50 Wallonia)	4
Bolivia Airplay (Monitor Latino)	16
Bulgaria Airplay (PROPHON)	1
Canada Hot 100 (Billboard)	15
Canada AC (Billboard)	7
Canada CHR/Top 40 (Billboard)	8
Canada Hot AC (Billboard)	7
Central America Anglo Airplay (Monitor Latino)	6
Chile Airplay (Monitor Latino)	3
Colombia Anglo Airplay (Monitor Latino)	5
Colombia Anglo Airplay (National-Report)	10
CIS Airplay (TopHit)	2
Costa Rica Anglo Airplay (Monitor Latino)	10
Croatia International Airplay (Top lista)	1
Czech Republic Airplay (ČNS IFPI)	1
Denmark Airplay (Tracklisten)	1
Dominican Republic Anglo Airplay (Monitor Latino)	6
Ecuador Anglo Airplay (Monitor Latino)	3
Estonia Airplay (TopHit)	3
Finland Airplay (Radiosoittolista)	3
France (SNEP)	77
Germany (GfK)	21
Global Excl. US (Billboard)	180
Greece Airplay (IFPI)	6
Guatemala Anglo Airplay (Monitor Latino)	5
Honduras Anglo Airplay (Monitor Latino)	1
Hungary (Dance Top 40)	11
Hungary (Rádiós Top 40)	1
Israel International Airplay (Media Forest)	2
Italy Airplay (EarOne)	14
Jamaica Airplay (JAMMS)	5
Kazakhstan Airplay (TopHit)	7
Latin America Anglo Airplay (Monitor Latino)	2
Latvia Airplay (LaIPA)	4
Lebanon (Lebanese Top 20)	6
Lithuania Airplay (TopHit)	7
Malta Airplay (Radiomonitor)	2
Mexico Anglo Airplay (Monitor Latino)	3
Moldova Airplay (TopHit)	42
Netherlands (Dutch Top 40)	4
Netherlands (Single Top 100)	24
New Zealand Hot Singles (RMNZ)	2
New Zealand Hot Singles (RMNZ) Hypaton remix	26
Nicaragua Anglo Airplay (Monitor Latino)	2
Nigeria Bubbling Under Hot 100 (TurnTable)	5
North Macedonia Airplay (Radiomonitor)	1
Norway Airplay (IFPI Norge)	28
Panama Anglo Airplay (Monitor Latino)	9
Paraguay Anglo Airplay (Monitor Latino)	4
Peru Anglo Airplay (Monitor Latino)	13
Poland Airplay (OLiS)	3
Portugal Airplay (AFP)	3
Puerto Rico Anglo Airplay (Monitor Latino)	4
Romania Airplay (UPFR)	3
Romania Airplay (Media Forest)	1
Romania TV Airplay (Media Forest)	16
Russia Airplay (TopHit)	9
Serbia Airplay (Radiomonitor)	1
Slovakia Airplay (ČNS IFPI)	1
Slovenia Airplay (Radiomonitor)	1
South Africa Airplay (TOSAC)	8
Spain Airplay (Promusicae)	6
Sweden (Sverigetopplistan)	85
Switzerland (Schweizer Hitparade)	48
Turkey International Airplay (Radiomonitor Türkiye)	1
Ukraine Airplay (TopHit)	4
UK Singles (Official Charts)	47
Uruguay Anglo Airplay (Monitor Latino)	7
US Billboard Hot 100	51
US Adult Contemporary (Billboard)	13
US Adult Pop Airplay (Billboard)	9
US Dance Airplay (Billboard)	1
US Pop Airplay (Billboard)	11
Venezuela Anglo Airplay (Monitor Latino)	2

Weekly chart performance for "Gone Gone Gone" (Extended remix version)
Chart (2025–2026)	Peak position
Belarus Airplay (TopHit)	41
CIS Airplay (TopHit)	36
Kazakhstan Airplay (TopHit)	148
Latvia Airplay (TopHit)	1
Moldova Airplay (TopHit)	93
Romania Airplay (TopHit)	72
Russia Airplay (TopHit)	46
Ukraine Airplay (TopHit)	148

=== Monthly charts ===
Monthly chart performance for "Gone Gone Gone"
Chart (2025–2026)	Peak position
Belarus Airplay (TopHit)	16
CIS Airplay (TopHit)	2
Estonia Airplay (TopHit)	7
Kazakhstan Airplay (TopHit)	12
Latvia Airplay (TopHit)	17
Lithuania Airplay (TopHit)	6
Moldova Airplay (TopHit)	71
Romania Airplay (TopHit)	10
Russia Airplay (TopHit)	13
Ukraine Airplay (TopHit)	5

Monthly chart performance for "Gone Gone Gone" (Extended remix version)
Chart (2025–2026)	Peak position
Belarus Airplay (TopHit)	60
CIS Airplay (TopHit)	52
Latvia Airplay (TopHit)	1
Russia Airplay (TopHit)	64

=== Year-end charts ===
Year-end chart performance for "Gone Gone Gone"
Chart (2025)	Position
Belgium (Ultratop 50 Flanders)	190
CIS Airplay (TopHit)	138
Estonia Airplay (TopHit)	88
Latvia Airplay (TopHit)	157
Lithuania Airplay (TopHit)	199
Netherlands (Dutch Top 40)	52
Poland (Polish Airplay Top 100)	68
Romania Airplay (TopHit)	107

== Certifications ==
Certifications for "Gone Gone Gone"
Region	Certification	Certified units/sales
Canada (Music Canada)	Gold	40,000^{‡}
France (SNEP)	Platinum	200,000^{‡}
New Zealand (RMNZ)	Gold	15,000^{‡}
United Kingdom (BPI)	Silver	200,000^{‡}
^{‡} Sales+streaming figures based on certification alone.

== Release history ==
Release dates and formats for "Gone Gone Gone"
Region	Date	Format	Version	Label	Ref.
Italy	10 October 2025	Contemporary hit radio	Original	Warner	
United Kingdom	10 October 2025	Contemporary hit radio	Original	What a DJ; Warner UK	
Various	10 October 2025	Digital download; streaming	Original	What a DJ; Warner UK	
United States	14 October 2025	Contemporary hit radio	Original	Warner	
Various	24 October 2025	Digital download; streaming	David Guetta remix	What a DJ; Warner UK	

== See also ==
- List of Billboard number-one dance songs of 2026
