= Silva Bumpa =

British DJ

Harry Eagle, known as Silva Bumpa, is a British DJ. His song "On 2nite" reached number 9 in the UK Singles Chart in 2026.

== Early life ==
Born in Sheffield, Eagle was raised in the Nether Edge neighbourhood. He played timpani and at 15 began using Ableton music software. He became inspired by his city's 2000s music scene, which included bassline and speed garage. Due to attending a different sixth form to his friends, he spent his time there researching music on YouTube and SoundCloud.

== Career ==
Under the name Weagle, he produced UK garage revival tracks in 2019. In 2022, he relocated to Manchester. He adopted his stage name as a tribute to influence Lil Silva. He was ranked 22nd on Mixmag's list of breakthrough DJs of 2024.

Silva Bumpa's single "On 2nite" peaked at number 9 on the UK Singles Chart in August 2026. His set at the Leeds Festival that month was cancelled due to safety concerns about crowd density.

== Discography ==
=== Charting singles ===
List of singles, with selected chart positions
Title	Year	Peak chart positions					
Title	Year	UK	UK Sales	AUS	IRE	NLD	US Dance
"Doin' It"	2025	—	34	—	—	—	—
"Lifting" (with Riordan)	2026	—	26	—	—	—	—
"Swagger Ground"	2026	—	26	—	—	—	—
"On 2nite"	2026	9	9	77	24	40	15
