= Free Your Mind =

Free Your Mind may refer to:

- Free Your Mind (Cut Copy album), 2013
- Free Your Mind (Maliq & D'Essentials album), 2007
- Free Your Mind (Prospa album), 2026
- Free Your Mind (MTV award), an award granted by MTV
- "Free Your Mind" (En Vogue song), 1992
- "Free Your Mind" (Prospa and Cloonee song), 2026
- Free Your Mind (EP), a 2009 EP by Anarbor
- Free Your Mind 33, a 1998 album by Dragon Ash
- Free Your Mind... and Your Ass Will Follow, a 1970 album by Funkadelic
- Free Your Mind, a 1996 book by Ellen Bass and Kate Kaufman
