= Glastonbury Festival 2025 =

Edition of British arts festival

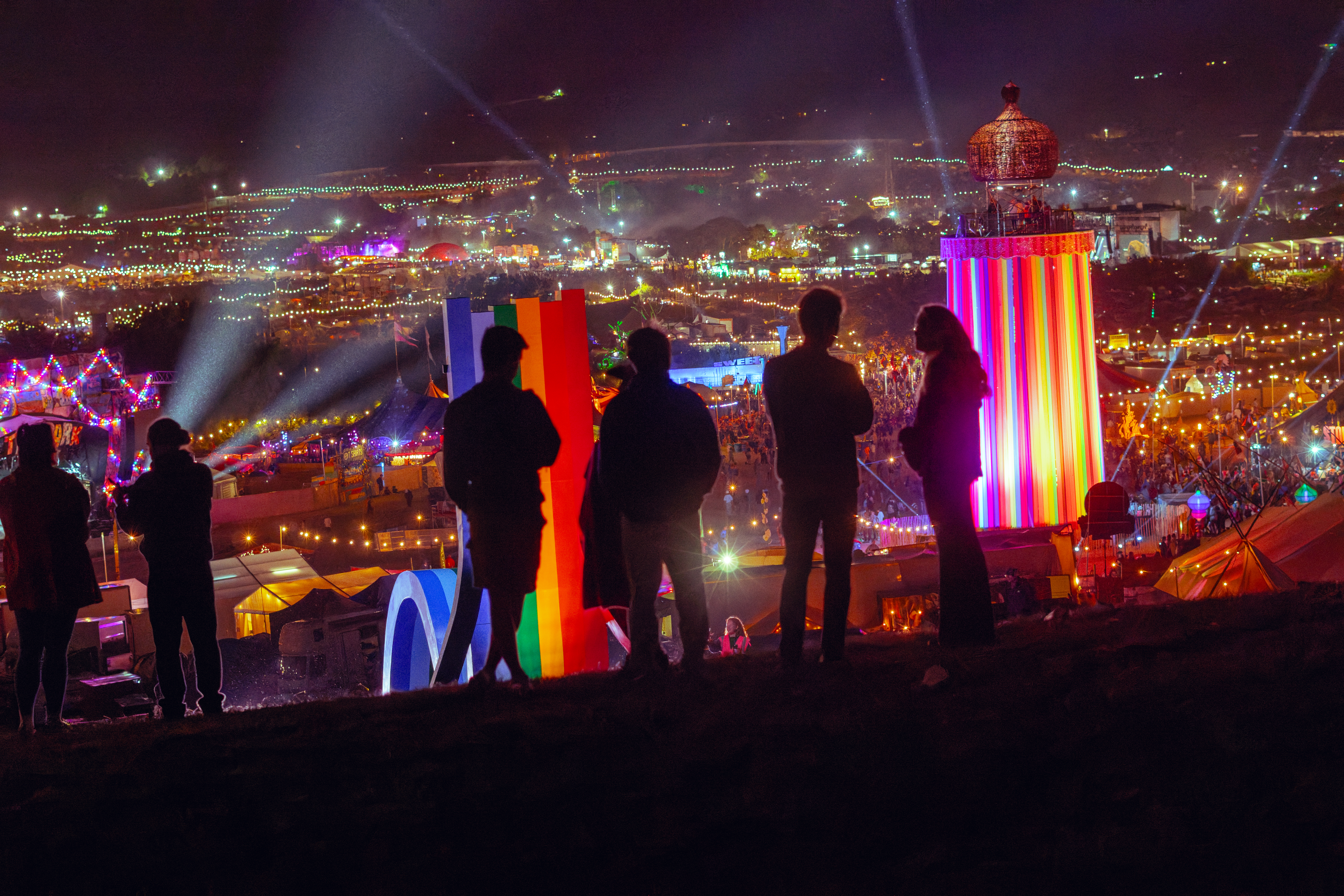
- Date: 25 June 2025 – 29 June 2025
- Locations: Worthy Farm, Pilton, Glastonbury, England
- Previous event: Glastonbury Festival 2024
- Next event: Glastonbury Festival 2027
- Attendance: 210,000
- Website: glastonburyfestivals.co.uk

The 2025 Glastonbury Festival of Contemporary Performing Arts took place between 25 and 29 June at Worthy Farm in Pilton, Glastonbury, and follows the 2024 edition of the festival. The three headlining acts were the 1975, Neil Young, and Olivia Rodrigo, with Rod Stewart performing in the traditional Sunday Legends slot.

This edition of the festival became famous after anti-Israel and pro-Palestine statements from the bands Kneecap and Bob Vylan led to international political controversy.

== Background ==
Rod Stewart was announced as Glastonbury's 2025 teatime Legend's Slot performer on 26 November 2024. Stewart made his only previous appearance at the festival in 2002 when he headlined alongside Coldplay and Stereophonics. A few days later on 29 November, Nile Rodgers accidentally confirmed that he and Chic would be performing at the festival immediately following Stewart's set during his acceptance speech at an awards show held at the Roundhouse in London. When informed that this had not been officially announced, Rodgers joked: "Am I not supposed to give that away? I always say too much." Chic previously performed at Glastonbury in 2017, coincidentally also following from that year's Legend's slot performer Barry Gibb.

On 1 January 2025, Neil Young announced that he would not be performing at Glastonbury 2025 in a statement expressing his belief that the festival was "now under corporate control", referencing their partnership with the BBC. The artist, who had been rumoured to perform but had not been confirmed or revealed by the organizers, released a subsequent statement on his blog two days later that he would indeed be headlining the festival alongside his new band, the Chrome Hearts, remarking that his initial comments had been due to a communication error.

An initial wave of performers, including both remaining headliners, was announced on 6 March 2025. The 1975 headlined for the first time after previous appearances at the festival in 2014 and 2016, while Olivia Rodrigo returned to the festival following a notable set on the Other Stage in 2022. Doechii made her Glastonbury debut headlining the West Holts Stage, while Charli XCX headlined the Other Stage on Saturday. Sunday's Other Stage headliners, The Prodigy, performed at the festival for the first time since 2009, and the first time to the death of their frontman Keith Flint in 2019.

The lineup for the Acoustic Stage was announced on 22 March, headlined by Ani DiFranco, Nick Lowe, and Roy Harper. It was announced the stage would feature a set by The Searchers, in what they have confirmed would be their final performance together. Having formed in 1957, they are considered one of the longest-running bands in history. Discussing the show, singer Frank Allen stated, “The Searchers are finally performing at the greatest music festival of them all. What a way to round off a tour and a career.” The Avalon Stage announced its lineup on 25 March. The West Holts Stage revealed the rest of its lineup on 27 March, including the remaining two headliners Maribou State, and Overmono. The Woodies lineup, featuring headliners Four Tet, Scissor Sisters, and Jorja Smith, was announced on 24 April, with the performance being the newly reunited Scissor Sisters' first appearance at the festival since 2010.

The full line-up was released on 3 June 2025. The bill included three "TBA" secret sets on the Pyramid, Woodsies, and Park stages respectively, and an unknown band billed as "Patchwork" on the Pyramid Stage. The Friday surprise sets were revealed to be Lorde on the Woodsies stage, and Lewis Capaldi on the Pyramid stage. "Patchwork" were ultimately revealed to be Pulp, performing on the Pyramid stage for the first time since their headlining set in 1998, and the first time overall since 2011 where they played a secret set on the Park stage. The final "TBA" set was revealed to be Haim. Deftones were forced to cancel their set on the Other stage due to illness, and were replaced by Skepta.

== Tickets ==
General admission tickets for the festival went on sale on 17 November 2024. The tickets, costing £373.50 for the full weekend, sold out in thirty-five minutes.

== Coverage and controversies ==
The BBC announced their presenting team and plans for two months of coverage for the festival on 3 June 2025. This included the usual livestreams of the five main stages, with on-demand sets available for catch-up on BBC iPlayer, along with select live broadcasts on BBC One, Two, and Four. Three visualised episodes of the BBC Sounds Sidetracked podcast also aired. BBC Radio 6 Music was announced as the "radio home of Glastonbury", and was dedicated to coverage of the festival.

In the weeks before the festival, several British politicians, including prime minister Keir Starmer, called for hip-hop group Kneecap to be removed from the line-up. Hours before the show, the BBC announced that it would not broadcast Kneecap's set live, but would make it available on-demand once it had reviewed the performance. The set was broadcast live from a festival-goer's cell phone via TikTok, reaching more than two million viewers. Kneecap led chants of "fuck Keir Starmer" and in favour of Palestine, while the audience waved Palestinian flags.

The BBC broadcast the live set by lesser-known punk-rap duo Bob Vylan, who played right before Kneecap. The vocalist, Bobby Vylan, led the crowd in chants for Palestine and against Israel's actions in the Gaza war, including "death, death to the IDF", which ignited a political controversy. According to the Guardian, some see it as valid political speech, but others found it "antisemitic" and "incitement to violence". Prime Minister Keir Starmer described it as "appalling hate speech". Conservative leader Kemi Badenoch called the scene "grotesque". The BBC apologised for what it called "deeply offensive" content and removed the performance from iPlayer. The United States Department of State revoked their visas, forcing them to cancel their planned tour there. British police said on 29 June that they were assessing videos of the performances by Kneecap and Bob Vylan; the following month the police decided not to take further action against Kneecap due to "insufficient evidence to provide a realistic prospect of conviction for any offence".

The Community Security Trust (CST), a UK charity that monitors antisemitism, reported that 29 June 2025, the day after Bob Vylan's Glastonbury performance, saw the highest daily number of antisemitic incidents recorded in the UK during the first half of the year, with 26 incidents logged. Of these, 12 were direct responses to statements issued by Jewish organisations reacting to the performance. CST described the chants as "utterly chilling", and included it as an example of how rhetoric surrounding Israel can inflame antisemitic sentiment. Home Secretary Yvette Cooper acknowledged the report’s findings, calling the level of antisemitic incidents "shamefully and persistently high" and affirming that the government "remains steadfast in its commitment to root out the poison of anti-Semitism wherever it is found."

== Line-up ==
=== Pyramid Stage ===
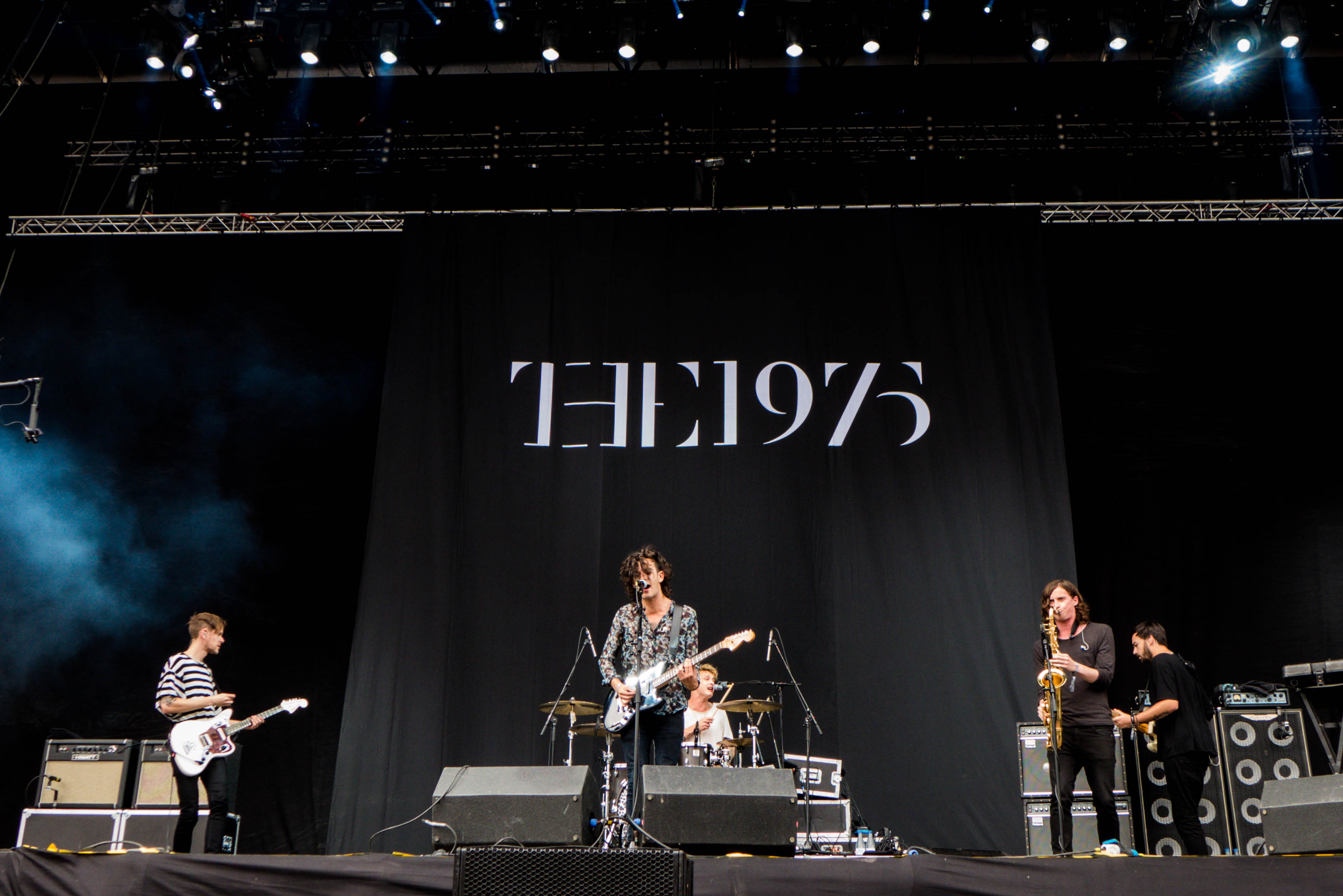
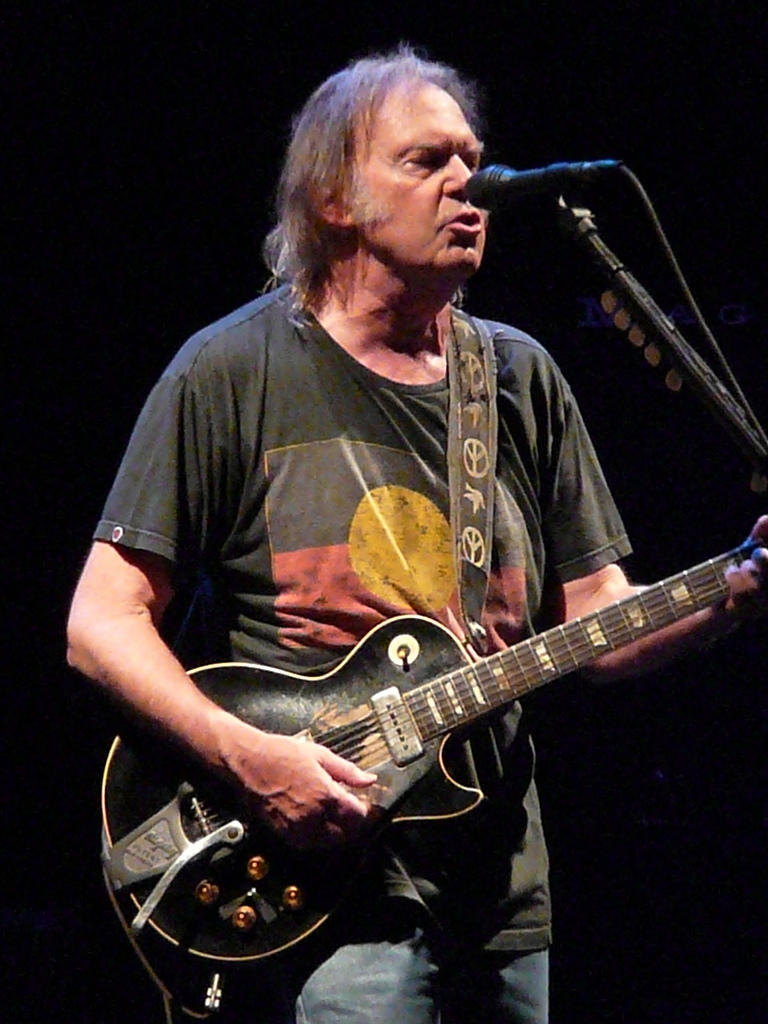
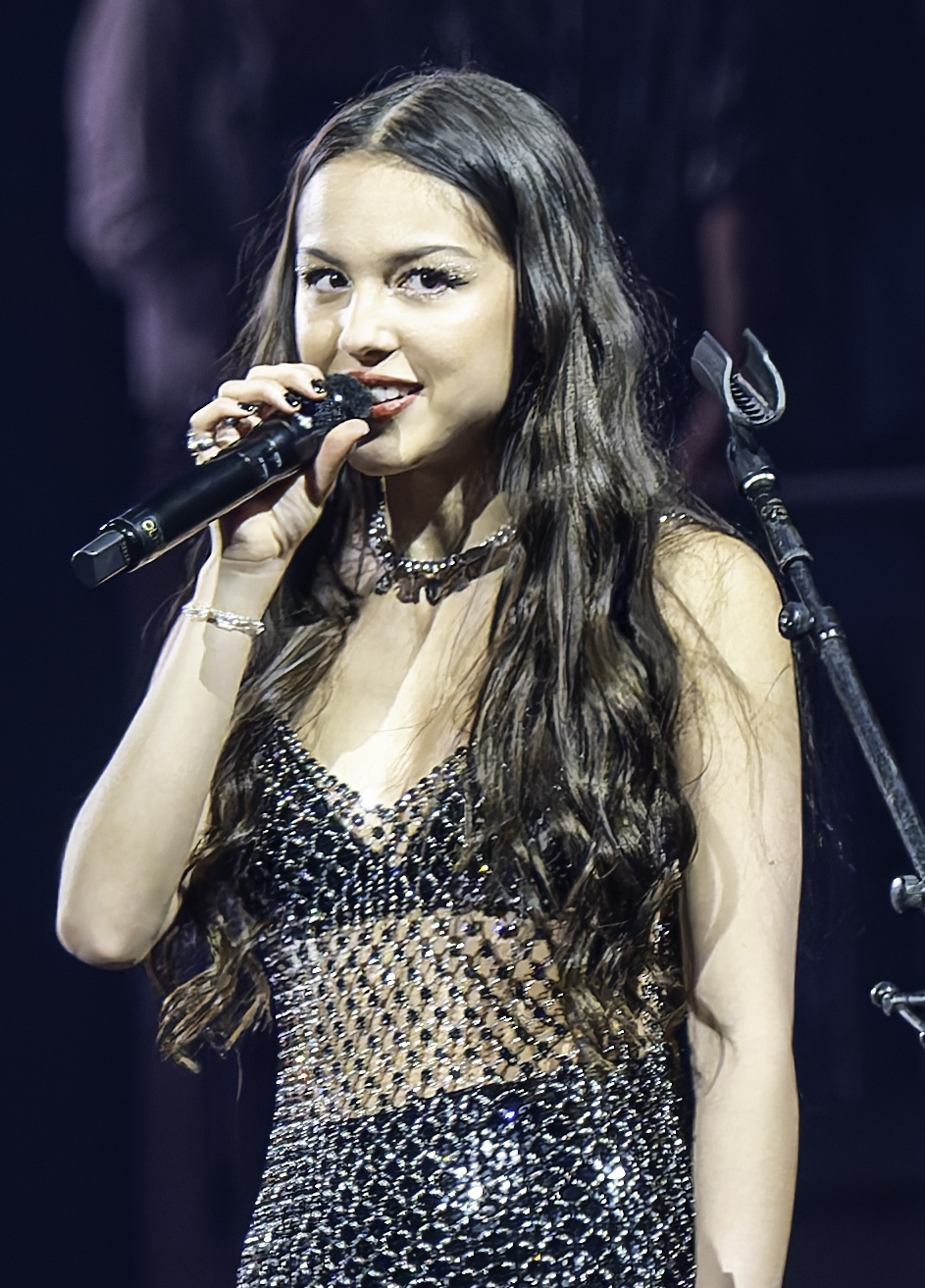
Pyramid Stage headliners the 1975, Neil Young, and Olivia Rodrigo.

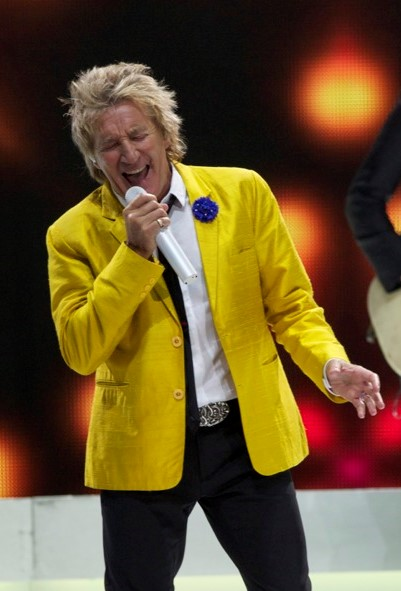
Rod Stewart performed in the iconic "Sunday Legends'" slot.

Friday	Saturday	Sunday
The 1975; 22:15 – 23:45; Biffy Clyro; 20:15 – 21:15; Alanis Morissette; 18:15 – 19:15; Lewis Capaldi; 16:55 – 17:30; Burning Spear; 15:00 – 16:00; CMAT; 13:30 – 14:30; Supergrass; 12:00 – 13:00	Neil Young and the Chrome Hearts^{[A]} 22:00 – 23:45; Raye; 20:00 – 21:00; Pulp^{[B]} 18:15 – 19:15; John Fogerty; 16:30 – 17:30; The Script; 15:00 – 16:00; Brandi Carlile^{[C]} 13:30 – 14:30; Kaiser Chiefs; 12:00 – 13:00	Olivia Rodrigo^{[D]} 21:45 – 23:15; Noah Kahan^{[E]} 19:45 – 20:45; Nile Rogers & Chic; 18:00 – 19:00; Rod Stewart^{[F]} 15:45 – 17:25; The Libertines; 14:00 – 15:00; Celeste; 12:30 – 13:30; The Selecter; 11:15 – 12:00

A. Neil Young's set included Micah Nelson and Spooner Oldham as members of his band, the Chrome Hearts.
B. Billed as "Patchwork". Pulp's set featured Richard Jones as part of their band.
C. Brandi Carlile's set featured Phil and Tim Hanseroth as part of her band.
D. Olivia Rodrigo's set featured a guest appearance from Robert Smith.
E. Noah Kahan's set featured guest appearances from Brandi Carlile and Laufey.
F. Rod Stewart's set featured guest appearances from Ronnie Wood, Mick Hucknall, and Lulu.

Pyramid Stage Set Lists
Supergrass
- 1. I'd Like To Know
- 2. Caught by the Fuzz
- 3. Mansize Rooster
- 4. Alright
- 5. Lose It
- 6. Lenny
- 7. Strange Ones
- 8. She's So Loose
- 9. Time
- 10. Sofa (of My Lethargy)
- 11. Richard III
- 12. Late in the Day
- 13. Mary
- 14. Moving
- 15. Sun Hits the Sky
- 16. Pumping on Your Stereo
CMAT
- 1. Have Fun!
- 2. I Don't Really Care for You
- 3. 2 Wrecked 2 Care
- 4. Aw, Shoot
- 5. Take A Sexy Picture of Me
- 6. The Jamie Oliver Petrol Station
- 7. Running/Planning
- 8. I Wanna Be a Cowboy, Baby!
- 9. Stay for Something
Burning Spear
- 1. Door Peep Shall Not Enter
- 2. Jamaica
- 3. Nyah Keith
- 4. The Sun
- 5. Not Stupid
- 6. Old Marcus Garvey
- 7. Man in the Hills
- 8. Farover
- 9. African Postman
Lewis Capaldi
- 1. Before You Go
- 2. Grace
- 3. Hold Me While You Wait
- 4. Bruises
- 5. Survive
- 6. Forget Me
- 7. Someone You Loved
Alanis Morissette
- 1. Hand in My Pocket
- 2. Right Through You
- 3. Hands Clean
- 4. Head over Feet
- 5. You Learn
- 6. Smiling
- 7. Ironic
- 8. All I Really Want
- 9. You Oughta Know
- 10. Uninvited
- 11. Thank U
Biffy Clyro
- 1. A Little Love
- 2. That Golden Rule
- 3. Biblical
- 4. Mountains
- 5. Re-Arrange
- 6. Wolves of Winter
- 7. Tiny Indoor Fireworks
- 8. Black Chandelier
- 9. Instant History
- 10. Living Is a Problem Because Everything Dies
- 11. Bubbles
- 12. Many of Horror
The 1975
- 1. Happiness
- 2. If You're Too Shy (Let Me Know)
- 3. Love Me
- 4. She's American
- 5. Part of the Band
- 6. Chocolate
- 7. Paris
- 8. Robbers
- 9. Somebody Else
- 10. Falling For You
- 11. People
- 12. Be My Mistake
- 13. It's Not Living (If It's Not with You)
- 14. I Couldn't Be More in Love
- 15. I Always Wanna Die (Sometimes)
- 16. Love It If We Made It
- 17. Sex
- 18. Give Yourself a Try
- 19. The Sound
- 20. About You
Kaiser Chiefs
- 1. Everyday I Love You Less and Less
- 2. Saturday Night
- 3. Na Na Na Na Naa
- 4. Modern Way
- 5. Ruby
- 6. Reasons to Stay Alive
- 7. Never Miss a Beat
- 8. Hole in My Soul
- 9. I Predict a Riot
- 10. The Angry Mob
- 11. Take My Temperature
- 12. Oh My God
Brandi Carlile
- 1. Broken Horses
- 2. Swing for the Fences
- 3. You and Me on the Rock
- 4. The Story
- 5. You Without Me
- 6. Pride and Joy
- 7. Fake Plastic Trees (Radiohead cover)
- 8. Hold Out Your Hand
- 9. Right on Time
- 10. The Joke
- 11. Woodstock (Joni Mitchell cover)
The Script
- 1. Superheroes
- 2. Rain
- 3. Inside Out
- 4. The Man Who Can't Be Moved
- 5. If You Could See Me Now
- 6. Paint the Town Green
- 7. Before the Worst
- 8. Nothing
- 9. For the First Time
- 10. Breakeven
- 11. Hall of Fame
John Fogerty
- 1. Up Around the Bend
- 2. Green River
- 3. Born on the Bayou
- 4. Who'll Stop the Rain
- 5. Lookin' out My Back Door
- 6. Fight Fire
- 7. Keep On Chooglin'
- 8. Have You Ever Seen the Rain?
- 9. Cotton Fields
- 10. Down on the Corner
- 11. The Old Man Down the Road
- 12. Fortunate Son
- 13. Bad Moon Rising
- 14. Proud Mary
Pulp
- 1. Sorted for E's & Wizz
- 2. Disco 2000
- 3. Spike Island
- 4. O.U. (Gone, Gone)
- 5. Acrylic Afternoons
- 6. Something Changed
- 7. Do You Remember the First Time?
- 8. Mis-Shapes
- 9. Got to Have Love
- 10. Babies
- 11. Common People
Raye
- 1. Where Is My Husband!
- 2. The Thrill Is Gone
- 3. Oscar Winning Tears
- 4. Suzanne
- 5. Mary Jane
- 6. Ice Cream Man
- 7. I Know You're Hurting
- 8. Worth It
- 9. You Don't Know Me
- 10. Secrets
- 11. Black Mascara
- 12. Prada
- 13. Escapism
Neil Young and the Chrome Hearts
- 1. Sugar Mountain
- 2. Be the Rain
- 3. When You Dance I Can Really Love
- 4. Cinnamon Girl
- 5. Heart of Steel (Fuckin' Up)
- 6. Hey Hey, My My (Into the Black)
- 7. The Needle and the Damage Done
- 8. Harvest Moon
- 9. Looking Forward
- 10. Sun Green
- 11. Love and Only Love
- 12. Like a Hurricane
- 13. Name of Love
- 14. Old Man
- 15. Rockin' in the Free World
- 16. Throw Your Hatred Down
The Selecter
- 1. The Avengers Theme
- 2. Three Minute Hero
- 3. Frontline
- 4. War War War
- 5. Murder
- 6. Missing Words
- 7. Train to Skaville
- 8. Carry Go Bring Home
- 9. On My Radio
- 10. Too Much Pressure/Presssure Drop (Toots and the Maytals cover)
Celeste
- 1. Dreams Made of Gold
- 2. On With the Show
- 3. Happening Again
- 4. Both Sides of the Moon
- 5. Lately
- 6. Only Time Will Tell
- 7. Free
- 8. Taste of Your Love
- 9. Guess We'll Never Know
- 10. Everyday
- 11. Could Be Machine
- 12. Woman of Faces
- 13. This is Who I Am
- 14. Strange
The Libertines
- 1. Up the Bracket
- 2. The Delaney
- 3. What Became of the Likely Lads
- 4. Boys in the Band
- 5. Night of the Hunter
- 6. What Kate Did
- 7. Shiver
- 8. Merry Old England
- 9. Death on the Stairs
- 10. Music When the Lights Go Out
- 11. Run Run Run
- 12. Time for Heroes
- 13. Can't Stand Me Now
- 14. Don't Look Back into the Sun
Rod Stewart
- 1. Tonight I'm Yours (Don't Hurt Me)
- 2. Having a Party
- 3. Some Guys Have All the Luck
- 4. Love Train (The O'Jays cover)
- 5. The First Cut Is the Deepest
- 6. Tonight's the Night (Gonna Be Alright)
- 7. Forever Young
- 8. You Wear It Well
- 9. Maggie May
- 10. Young Turks
- 11. It's a Heartache (Bonnie Tyler cover)
- 12. I'd Rather Go Blind (Etta James cover)
- 13. Da Ya Think I'm Sexy?
- 14. Lady Marmalade (Labelle cover) performed by backing singers
- 15. I Don't Want to Talk About It
- 16. If You Don't Know Me by Now (Harold Melvin & the Blue Notes cover) with Mick Hucknall
- 17. Baby Jane
- 18. Proud Mary (Creedence Clearwater Revival cover) performed by backing singers
- 19. Stay with Me with Ronnie Wood
- 20. Hot Legs with Lulu and Ronnie Wood
- 21. Sailing
Nile Rogers & Chic
- 1. Le Freak
- 2. Everybody Dance
- 3. Dance, Dance, Dance (Yowsah, Yowsah, Yowsah)
- 4. I Want Your Love
- 5. I'm Coming Out
- 6. Upside Down
- 7. He's the Greatest Dancer
- 8. We Are Family
- 9. Like a Virgin
- 10. Material Girl
- 11. Modern Love
- 12. Get Lucky
- 13. Lose Yourself to Dance
- 14. Thinking of You
- 15. Let's Dance
- 16. Good Times (with elements of "Rapper's Delight" and "Chic Cheer")
Noah Kahan
- 1. All My Love
- 2. Everywhere, Everything
- 3. She Calls Me Back
- 4. New Perspective
- 5. Call Your Mom with Laufey
- 6. Northern Attitude
- 7. Maine
- 8. Dial Drunk
- 9. You're Gonna Go Far with Brandi Carlile
- 10. Stick Season
- 11. Homesick
Olivia Rodrigo
- 1. Obsessed
- 2. Ballad of a Homeschooled Girl
- 3. Vampire
- 4. Drivers License
- 5. Traitor
- 6. Bad Idea Right?
- 7. Love Is Embarrassing
- 8. Pretty Isn't Pretty
- 9. Happier
- 10. Enough for You
- 11. Friday I'm in Love (The Cure cover) with Robert Smith
- 12. Just Like Heaven (The Cure cover) with Robert Smith
- 13. So American
- 14. Jealousy, Jealousy
- 15. Favorite Crime
- 16. Deja Vu
- 17. Brutal
- 18. All-American Bitch
- 19. Good 4 U
- 20. Get Him Back!

=== Other Stage ===
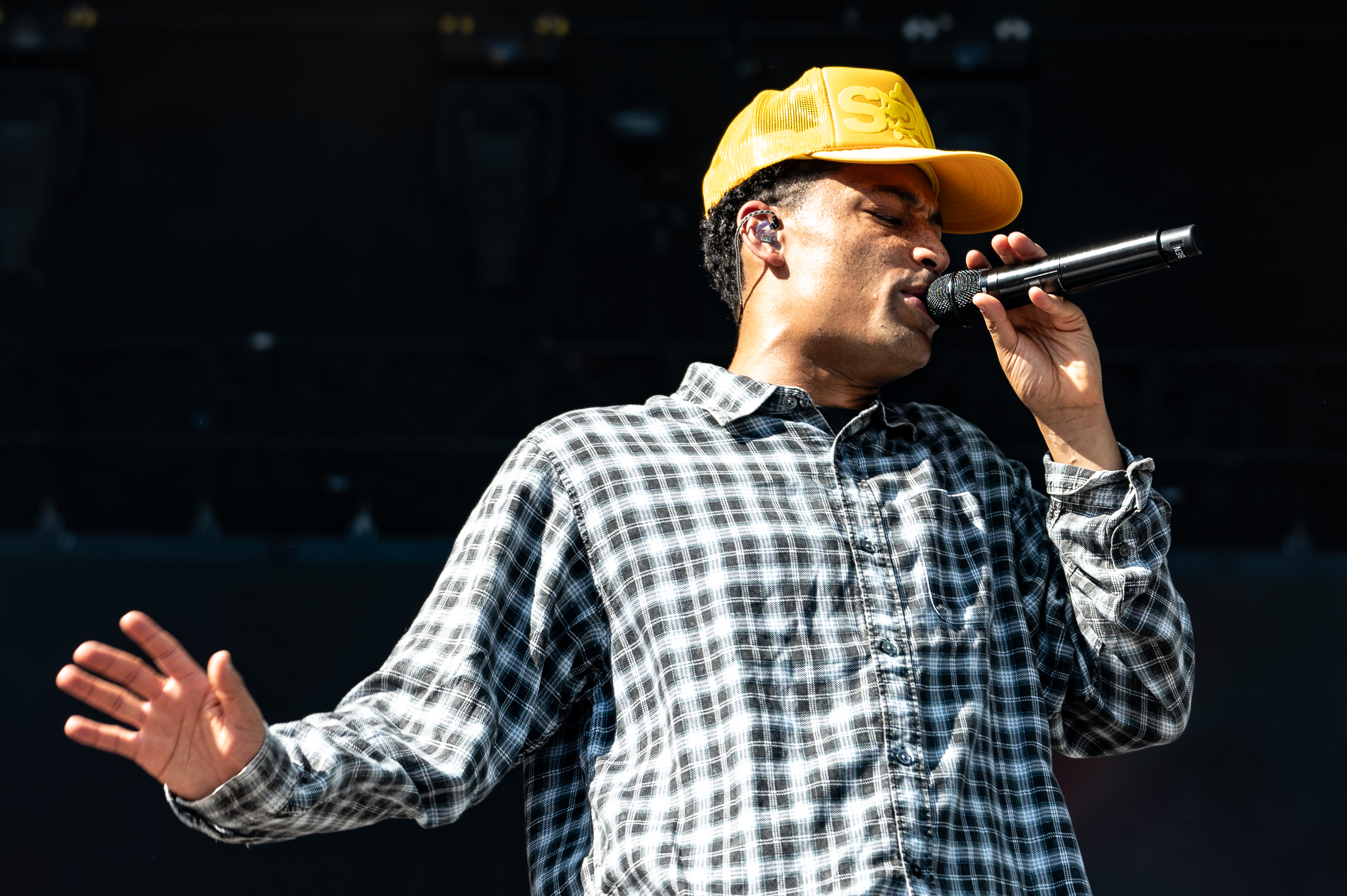
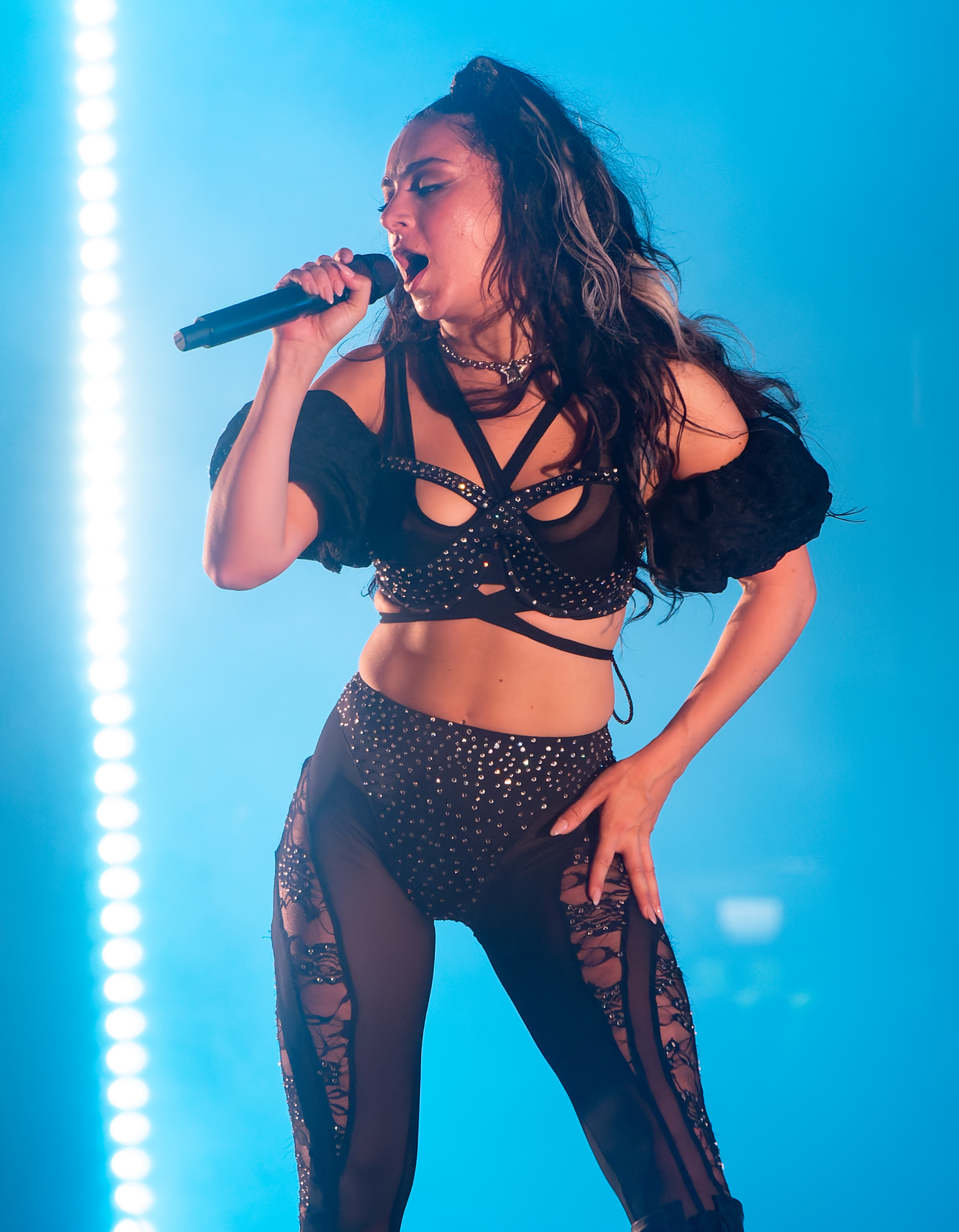
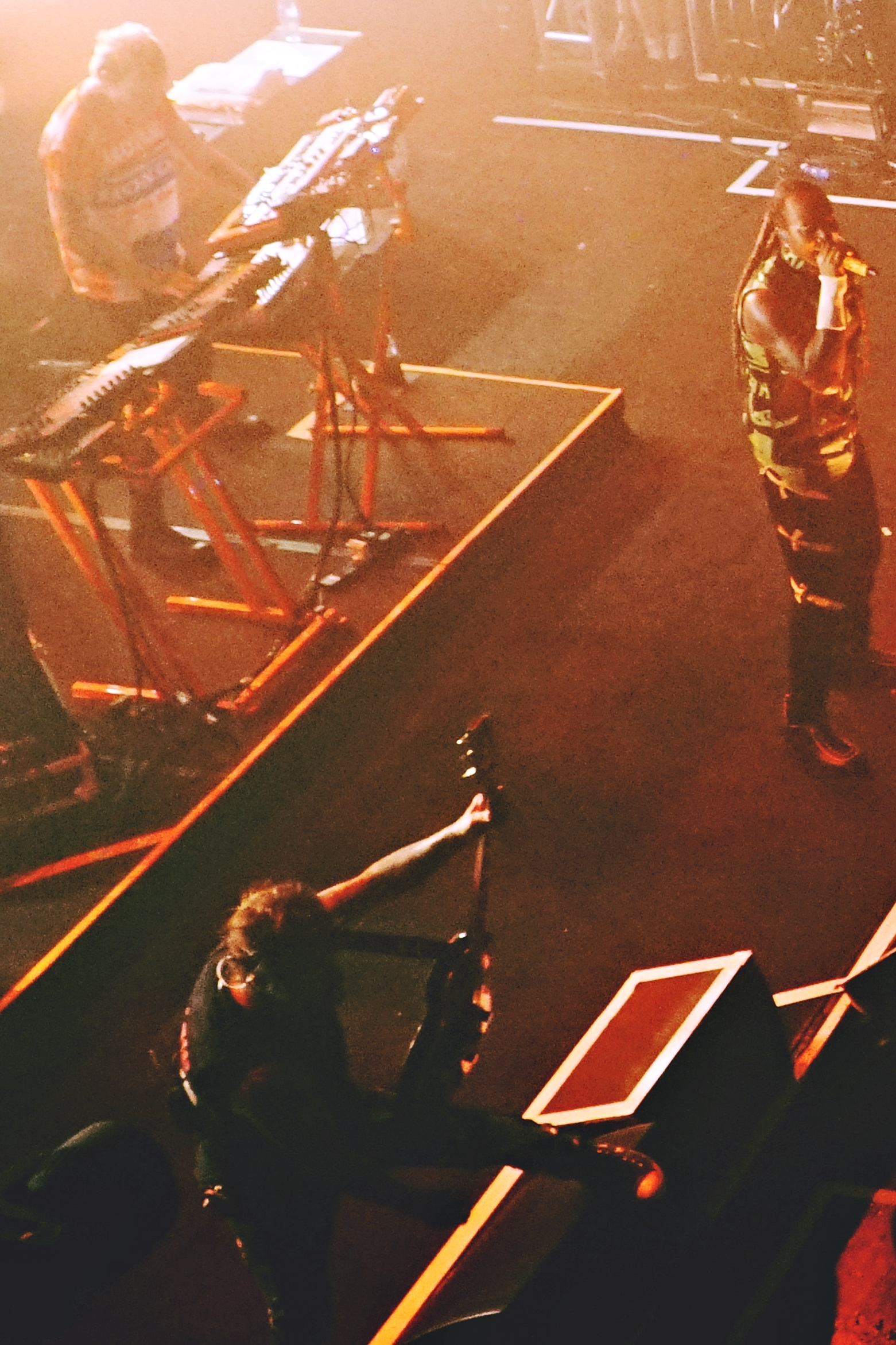
Other Stage headliners Loyle Carner, Charli XCX and the Prodigy.

Friday	Saturday	Sunday
Loyle Carner^{[A]} 22:30 – 23:45; Busta Rhymes^{[B]} 20:30 – 21:30; Gracie Abrams; 18:45 – 19:45; Franz Ferdinand^{[C]} 17:15 – 18:15; Wet Leg; 15:45 – 16:45; Inhaler; 14:15 – 15:15; Rizzle Kicks; 13:00 – 13:45; Fabio & Grooverider; 11:30 – 12:30	Charli XCX; 22:30 – 23:45; Skepta; 20:30 – 21:30; Ezra Collective^{[D]} 19:00 – 20:15; Amyl and the Sniffers; 17:00 – 18:00; Weezer; 15:30 – 16:30; Beabadoobee; 14:00 – 15:00; Good Neighbours; 12:45 – 13:45; Alessi Rose; 11:30 – 12:15	The Prodigy; 21:45 – 23:15; Wolf Alice; 19:45 – 20:45; Snow Patrol; 18:00 – 19:00; Turnstile; 16:30 – 17:30; Joy Crookes; 15:00 – 16:00; Shaboozey; 13:45 – 14:30; Nadine Shah; 12:30 – 13:15; Louis Dunford; 11:15 – 12:00

A. Loyle Carner's set featured a guest appearance from Sampha and Jorja Smith.
B. Busta Rhymes' set featured Spliff Star and DJ Scratch as part of his band.
C. Franz Ferdinand's set featured guest appearances from Peter Capaldi and Master Peace.
D. Ezra Collective's set featured guest appearances from Kojey Radical, Loyle Carner, and Sasha Keable.

=== West Holts stage ===
Friday	Saturday	Sunday
Maribou State; 22:15 – 23:45; BadBadNotGood; 20:30 – 21:30; Denzel Curry; 19:00 – 20:00; En Vogue; 17:30 – 18:30; Vieux Farka Touré; 16:00 – 17:00; Glass Beams; 14:30 – 15:30; Ca7riel & Paco Amoroso; 13:00 – 14:00; Corto.alto; 11:30 – 12:30	Doechii; 22:45 – 23:30; Amaarae; 20:30 – 21:30; Greentea Peng; 19:00 – 20:00; Yussef Dayes; 17:30 – 18:30; Kneecap; 16:00 – 17:00; Bob Vylan; 14:30 – 15:30; Nilüfer Yanya; 13:00 – 14:00; Infinity Song; 11:30 – 12:30	Overmono^{[A]} 21:45 – 23:15; Parcels; 20:00 – 21:00; The Brian Jonestown Massacre; 18:30 – 19:30; Goat; 17:00 – 18:00; Black Uhuru; 15:30 – 16:30; Cymande; 14:00 – 15:00; Abel Selaocoe; 12:30 – 13:30; Thandii; 11:00 – 12:00

A. Overmono's set featured guest appearances from Kwengface and For Those I Love.

=== Woodsies ===
Friday	Saturday	Sunday
Four Tet; 22:30 – 23:45; Floating Points; 21:00 – 22:00; PinkPantheress^{[A]} 19:30 – 20:30; Blossoms^{[B]} 18:00 – 19:00; Lola Young; 16:30 – 17:30; Shed Seven^{[C]} 15:15 – 16:00; Fat Dog; 14:00 – 14:45; Myles Smith; 12:45 – 13:30; Lorde; 11:30 – 12:15	Scissor Sisters^{[D]} 22:30 – 23:45; Tom Odell; 21:00 – 22:00; Father John Misty; 19:30 – 20:30; TV on the Radio; 18:00 – 19:00; Nova Twins; 16:30 – 17:30; JADE^{[E]} 15:15 – 16:00; Fcukers; 14:00 – 14:45; Sorry; 12:45 – 13:30; The Amazons; 11:30 – 12:15	Jorja Smith^{[F]} 21:30 – 22:45; AJ Tracey^{[G]} 20:00 – 21:00; St. Vincent; 18:30 – 19:30; Black Country, New Road; 17:00 – 18:00; Djo; 15:30 – 16:30; Sprints^{[H]} 14:00 – 15:00; Gurriers; 12:30 – 13:30; Westside Cowboy; 11:15 – 12:00

A. PinkPantheress' set featured a guest appearance from Just Jack.
B. Blossoms' set featured a guest appearance from CMAT.
C. Shed Seven's set featured a guest appearance from Elvana.
D. Scissor Sisters's set featured guest appearances from Ian McKellen, Beth Ditto, and Jessie Ware.
E. JADE's set featured guest appearances from Ncuti Gatwa and Confidence Man.
F. Jorja Smith's set featured a guest appearance from AJ Tracey.
G. AJ Tracey's set featured guest appearances from Master Peace, Aitch, and Big Zuu.
H. Sprints' set featured a guest appearance from Kate Nash.

=== The Park Stage ===
Friday	Saturday	Sunday
Anohni and the Johnsons; 23:00 – 00:15; Self Esteem; 21:15 – 22:15; Wunderhorse; 19:30 – 20:30; Osees; 18:00 – 19:00; English Teacher; 16:30 – 17:30; Faye Webster; 15:15 – 16:00; Jalen Ngonda; 14:00 – 15:45; John Glacier; 12:45 – 13:30; Horsegirl; 11:30 – 12:10	Caribou; 23:00 – 00:15; Beth Gibbons; 21:15 – 22:15; Haim; 19:30 – 20:30; Gary Numan; 18:00 – 19:00; Pa Salieu; 16:45 – 17:30; Lucy Dacus; 15:30 – 16:15; Japanese Breakfast; 14:00 – 15:00; Ichiko Aoba; 12:45 – 13:30; Yann Tiersen; 11:10 – 12:10	The Maccabees^{[A]} 21:15 – 22:30; Future Islands; 19:35 – 20:35; Kae Tempest; 18:00 – 19:00; Girl in Red; 16:30 – 17:30; Royel Otis; 15:15 – 16:00; Katy J Pearson; 14:00 – 14:45; Geordie Greep; 12:45 – 13:30; Melin Melyn; 11:30 – 12:15

A. The Maccabees' set featured a guest appearance from Florence Welch.

=== Acoustic stage ===
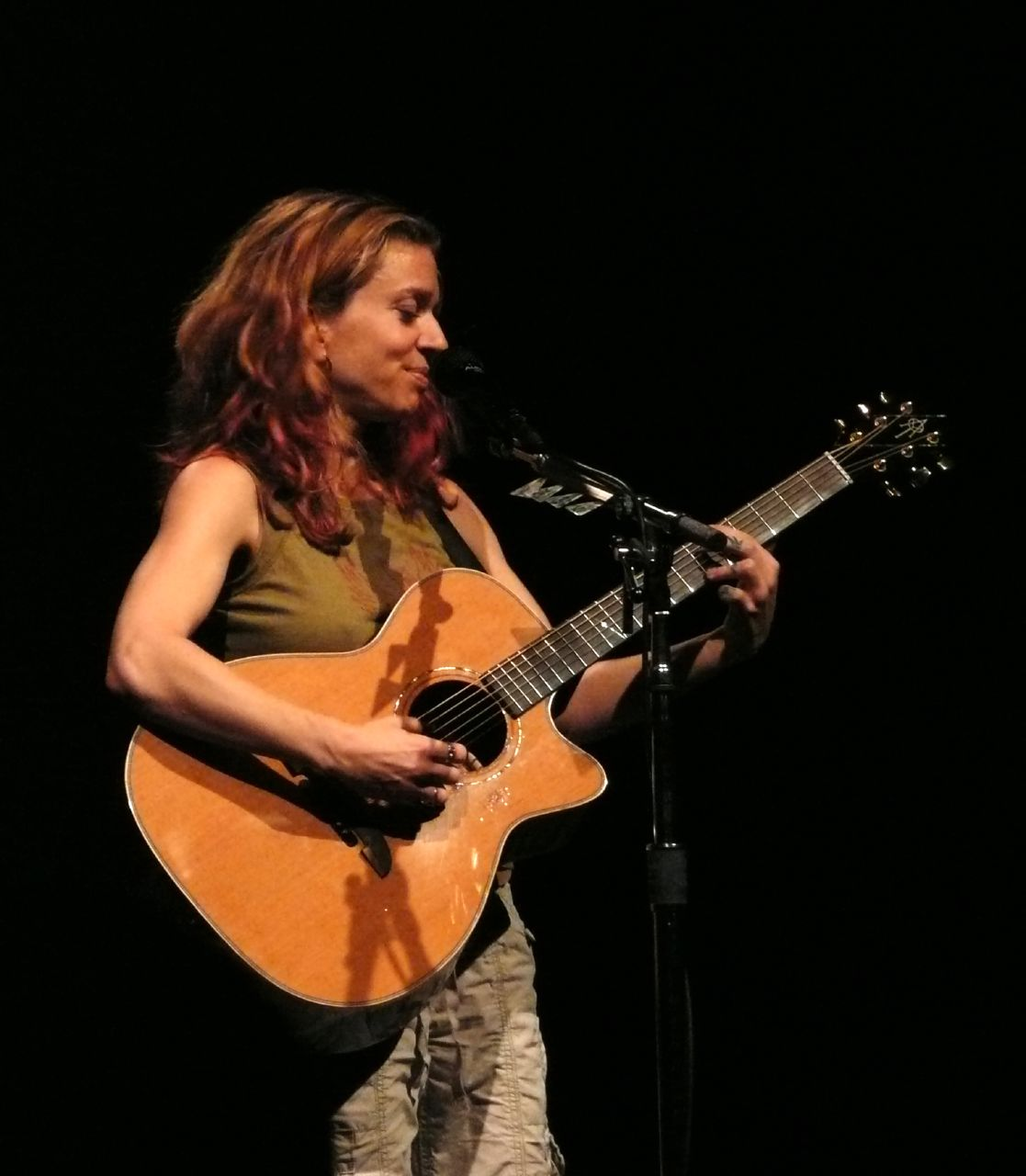
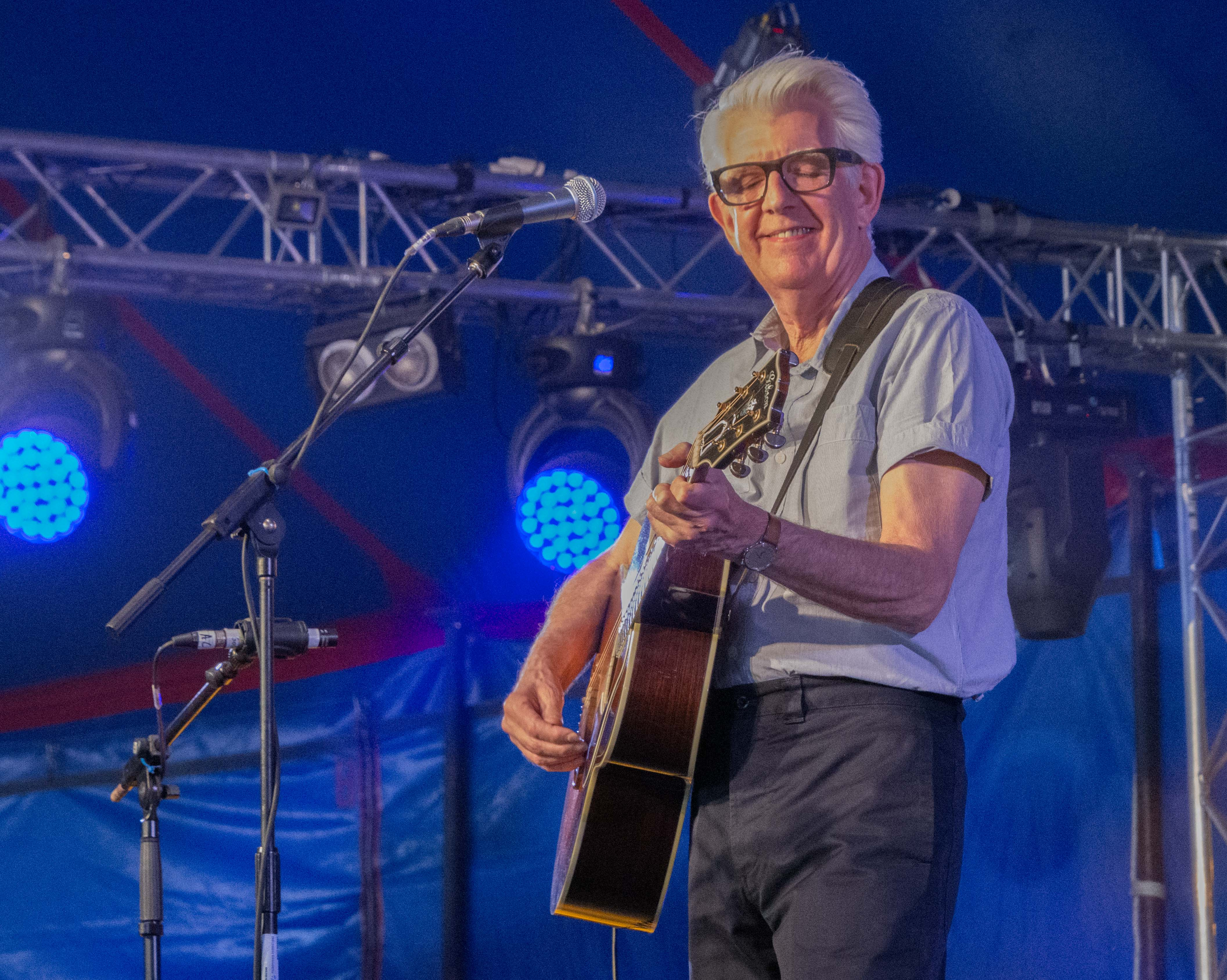
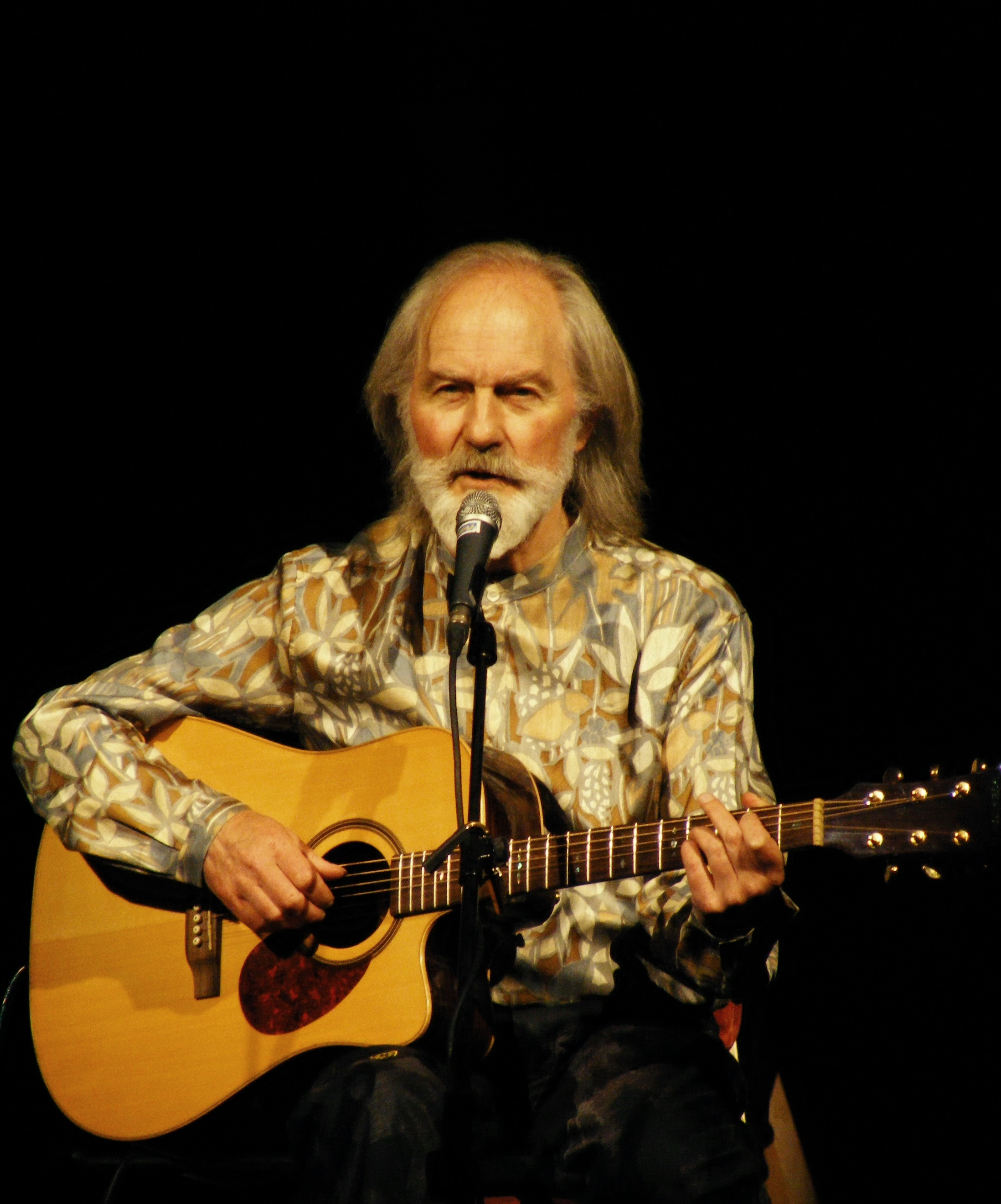
Acoustic Stage headliners Ani DiFranco, Nick Lowe and Roy Harper.

Friday	Saturday	Sunday
Ani DiFranco; 21:30 – 22:45; The Searchers; 20:00 – 21:00; Dhani Harrison; 18:30 – 19:30; Billie Marten; 17:00 – 18:00; Skerryvore; 16:00 – 16:40; Hugh Cornwell; 15:00 – 15:40; Gabrielle Aplin; 14:00 – 14:40; Tift Merritt; 13:00 – 13:40; Nadia Reid; 12:10 – 12:40; Our Man in the Field; 11:30 – 12:00	Nick Lowe; 21:30 – 22:45; Hothouse Flowers; 20:00 – 21:00; Jeremy Loops; 18:30 – 19:30; The Coronas; 17:10 – 18:00; The Bluebells; 16:10 – 16:50; Not Completely Unknown^{[A]} 15:00 – 16:00; Sophie B. Hawkins; 14:00 – 14:40; Oisin Leech; 13:00 – 13:40; Lorraine Nash; 12:10 – 12:40; Henry Grace; 11:30 – 12:00	Roy Harper; 21:30 – 22:30; The Bootleg Beatles; 20:00 – 21:00; Rhiannon Giddens^{[B]} 18:30 – 19:30; London Community Gospel Choir; 17:00 – 18:00; P. P. Arnold; 16:00 – 16:40; The Riptide Movement; 15:00 – 15:45; Michele Stodart; 14:00 – 14:40; The Henry Girls; 13:00 – 13:40; Toby Lee; 12:10 – 12:40; Dawn Landes; 11:30 – 12:00

A. Bob Dylan tribute featuring Paul Carrack, Sid Griffin, Katya, Ralph McTell, and Liam Ó Maonlaí.
B. Rhiannon Giddens' set featured Dirk Powell.

=== Avalon Stage ===
Friday	Saturday	Sunday
The Fratellis; 23:05 – 00:20; Terrorvision; 21:35 – 22:35; The Magic Numbers; 20:05 – 21:05; Orla Gartland; 18:35 – 19:35; Ash; 17:05 – 18:05; Paris Paloma; 15:35 – 16:35; Rumba de Bodas; 14:10 – 15:05; Beans On Toast; 12:50 – 13:40	Hard-Fi; 23:10 – 00:20; Tom Walker; 21:40 – 22:40; Rachel Chinouriri; 20:10 – 21:10; Jade Bird; 18:40 – 19:40; The Amy Winehouse Band; 17:10 – 18:10; Jamie Cullum; 15:40 – 16:40; Stephen Wilson Jr. 14:15 – 15:10; Bess Atwell; 12:50 – 13:45; FÜLÜ; 11:30 – 12:20	Alabama 3; 22:50 – 23:50; Bear's Den; 21:20 – 22:20; Sam Ryder; 19:50 – 20:50; The Big Moon; 18:20 – 19:20; My Baby; 16:50 – 17:50; The Horne Section; 15:20 – 16:20; Brooke Combe; 13:55 – 14:50; Talisk; 12:30 – 13:25; Dea Matrona; 11:25 – 12:05

=== Left Field ===
Friday	Saturday	Sunday
Billy Bragg; 21:00 – 22:00; Antony Szmierek; 19:50 – 20:30; Jasmine.4.T; 18:40 – 19:20; Gurriers; 17:35 – 18:10; The Meffs; 16:30 – 17:05	Kate Nash; 21:00 – 22:00; Lambrini Girls; 19:50 – 20:30; The Guest List; 18:40 – 19:20; Chloe Slater; 17:35 – 18:10; Girlband! 16:30 – 17:05	Grandson; 21:00 – 22:00; Reverend and the Makers; 19:45 – 20:30; Red Rum Club; 18:35 – 19:15; Du Blonde; 17:30 – 18:10; The Halfway Kid; 16:30 – 17:00
