= Glastonbury Festival 2027 =

Edition of British arts festival

- Date: 23 June 2027 – 27 June 2027
- Locations: Worthy Farm, Pilton, Glastonbury, England
- Previous event: Glastonbury Festival 2025
- Next event: Glastonbury Festival 2028
- Attendance: 210,000
- Website: glastonburyfestivals.co.uk

The 2027 Glastonbury Festival of Contemporary Performing Arts is the upcoming forty-third edition of the festival and is due to take place between 23 and 27 June 2027 at Worthy Farm in Pilton, Glastonbury. It is the first Glastonbury since the 2025 edition, as a fallow year was held in 2026. The three headlining acts are set to be Sam Fender, Harry Styles, and Billie Eilish, with Cher performing in the traditional Sunday Legends slot.

== Background ==
During the 2025 festival, organizer Emily Eavis confirmed that, as is customary for the festival, there would be no Glastonbury in 2026 to allow the land on Worthy Farm to recover. It was the first planned fallow year since 2018, and the first year without a festival since the 2020 and 2021 editions were cancelled due to the COVID-19 pandemic.

On 26 June 2026, Madonna hinted during an interview with Graham Norton that she had "something big" planned in the UK during summer 2027, fuelling speculation that she would headline Glastonbury. This followed rumours that she was set to headline the 2024 edition of the festival before negotiations fell apart. In August, Eavis denied this, advising that the festival had already booked its headliners and stated, "no, it's definitely not Madonna, I'll tell you that. But we have got three [other] headliners and we're very excited about it - it's all coming together really well." Eavis joked that "pretty much 95% of the stories [about Glastonbury] you read are not true," but expressed her excitement at the return of the festival after a fallow year. In September, Eavis was also forced to dispute claims that Oasis were one of the 2027 headliners following the announcement of their 2027 tour dates which left a noticeable gap on the 27 June, which would be the final day of the festival. Liam Gallagher also denied the rumours, posting "it's not happening, so all you Croc wearing flag waving [people] can calm [...] down" on X in response to a fan who asked him about a potential appearance. Other speculated headliners for 2027 included Styles and Fender, Taylor Swift (after her 2020 headline set was cancelled), Sabrina Carpenter, Fred Again, Raye, Miley Cyrus, Justin Bieber, Rihanna, Lady Gaga, Bad Bunny Bruce Springsteen, Eminem, Kendrick Lamar, Charli XCX, Chappell Roan, and previous headliners Ed Sheeran, Radiohead, Pulp, Adele, and Florence and the Machine.

The initial line-up was announced on 18 November 2026 with its traditional poster designed by British artist Stanley Donwood, including the three headliners Sam Fender, Harry Styles, and Billie Eilish, as well as Cher, who will perform in the Sunday Legends slot. It is the youngest trio of headliners in the history of the festival, with both Fender and Styles being 33 and Eilish 25, and the second time that all three headliners have been solo artists. Eilish is the only returning headliner, having previously became the festival's youngest solo headliner in 2022. Prior to this, Eilish also performed at the 2019 edition of the festival. Fender headlines for the first time, having previously played in the slot immediately before Eilish in 2022. He was also scheduled to perform in 2020 before the festival was cancelled. Styles makes his Glastonbury debut headlining the Saturday night. Cher's appearance was described as a "true coup" for the festival, as she has not toured since her Here We Go Again Tour was forced to conclude early in 2020 due to the COVID-19 pandemic. In a statement accompanying the announcement, Eavis said, "we are so happy to be coming back after our fallow year and, as we head into winter after that peaceful period, we wanted to give you an early musical taster of what’s to come at Glastonbury 2027 with this spread of incredible artists. We are beyond excited about how it’s all shaping up. We will bring you even more names in the new year and can’t wait to see you down here on Worthy farm in June for some much-needed good times."

== Tickets ==
General admission tickets for the festival went on sale on 4 October 2026. They cost £408 for the full weekend and sold out within 42 minutes.

== Line-up ==
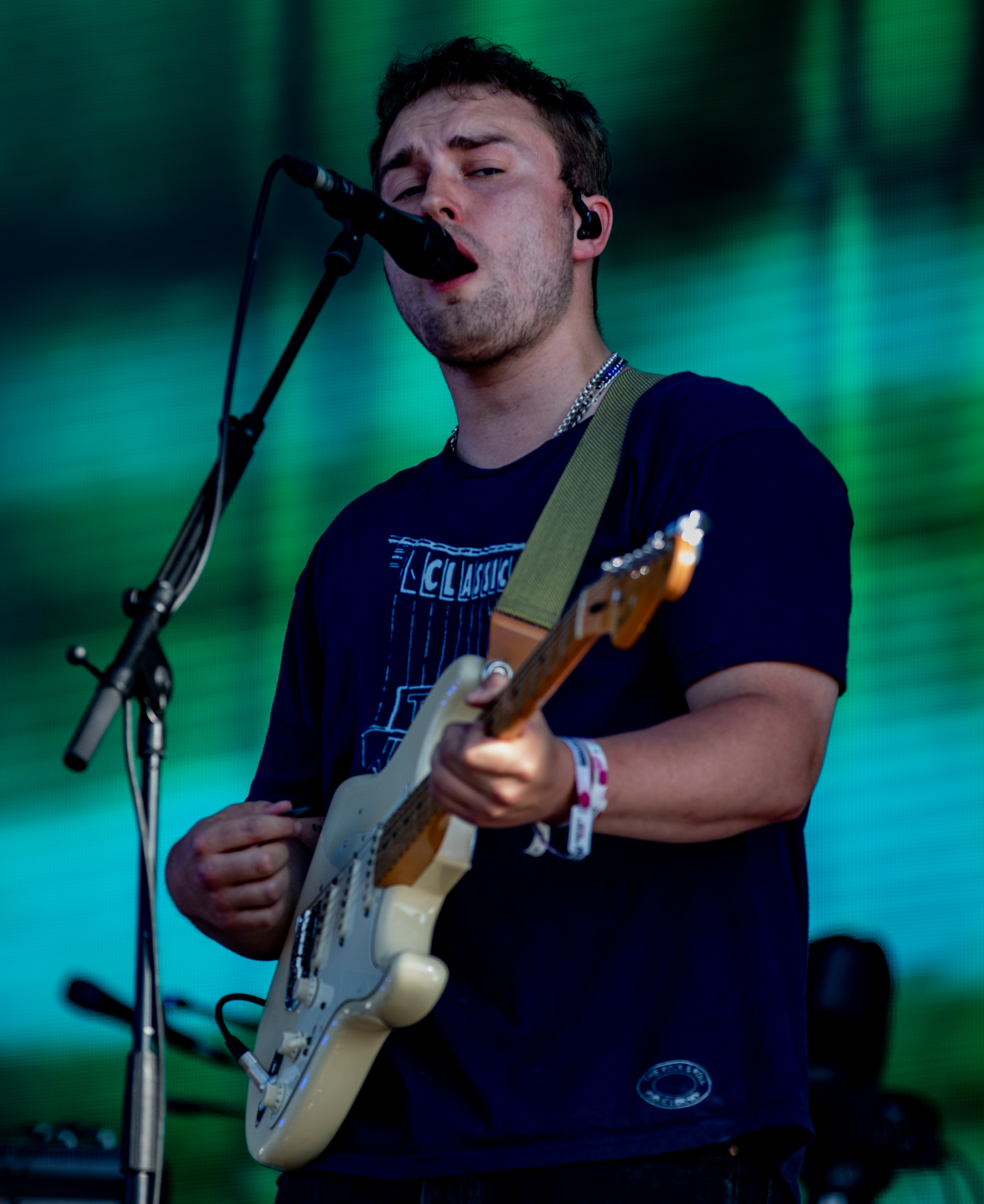
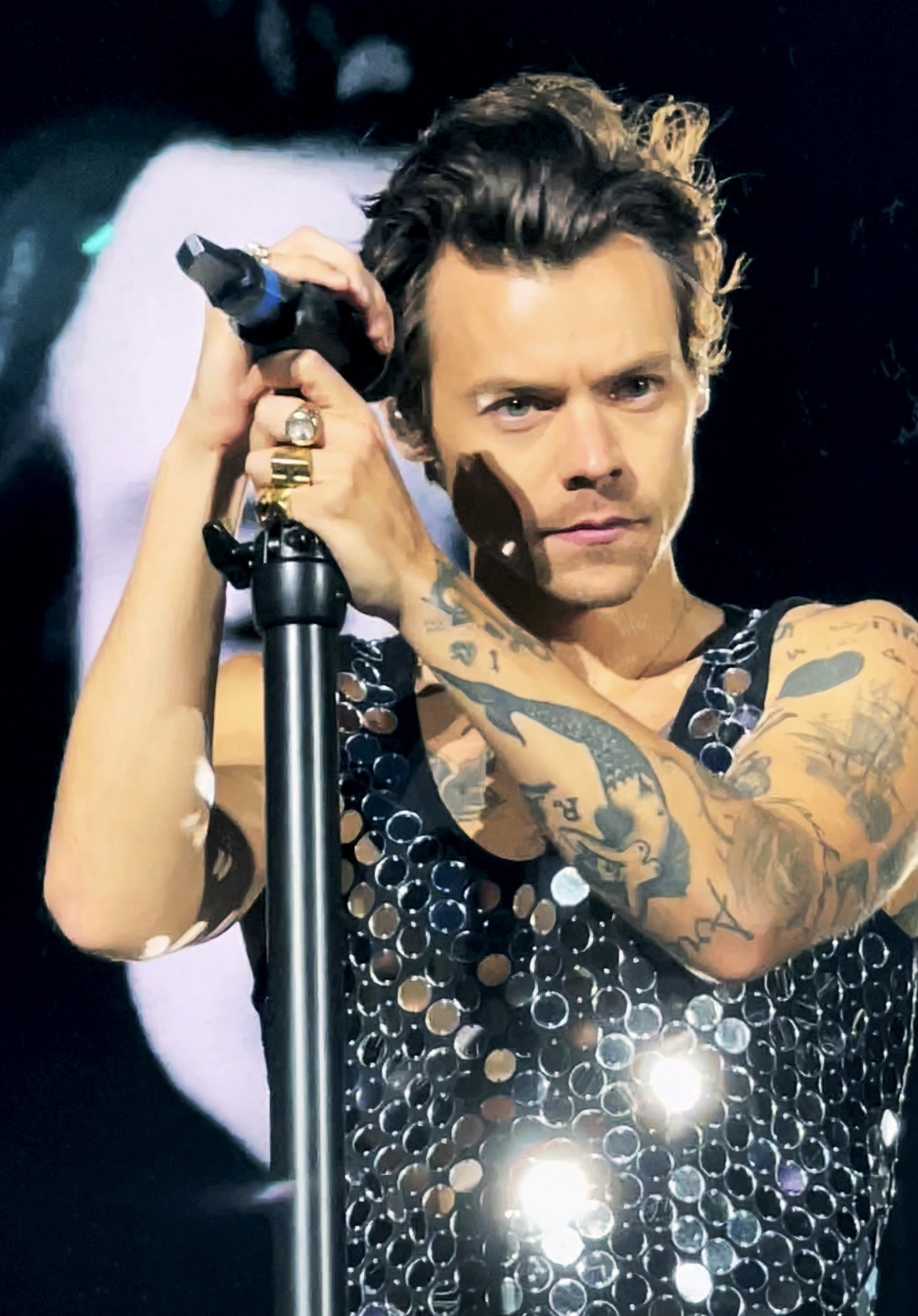
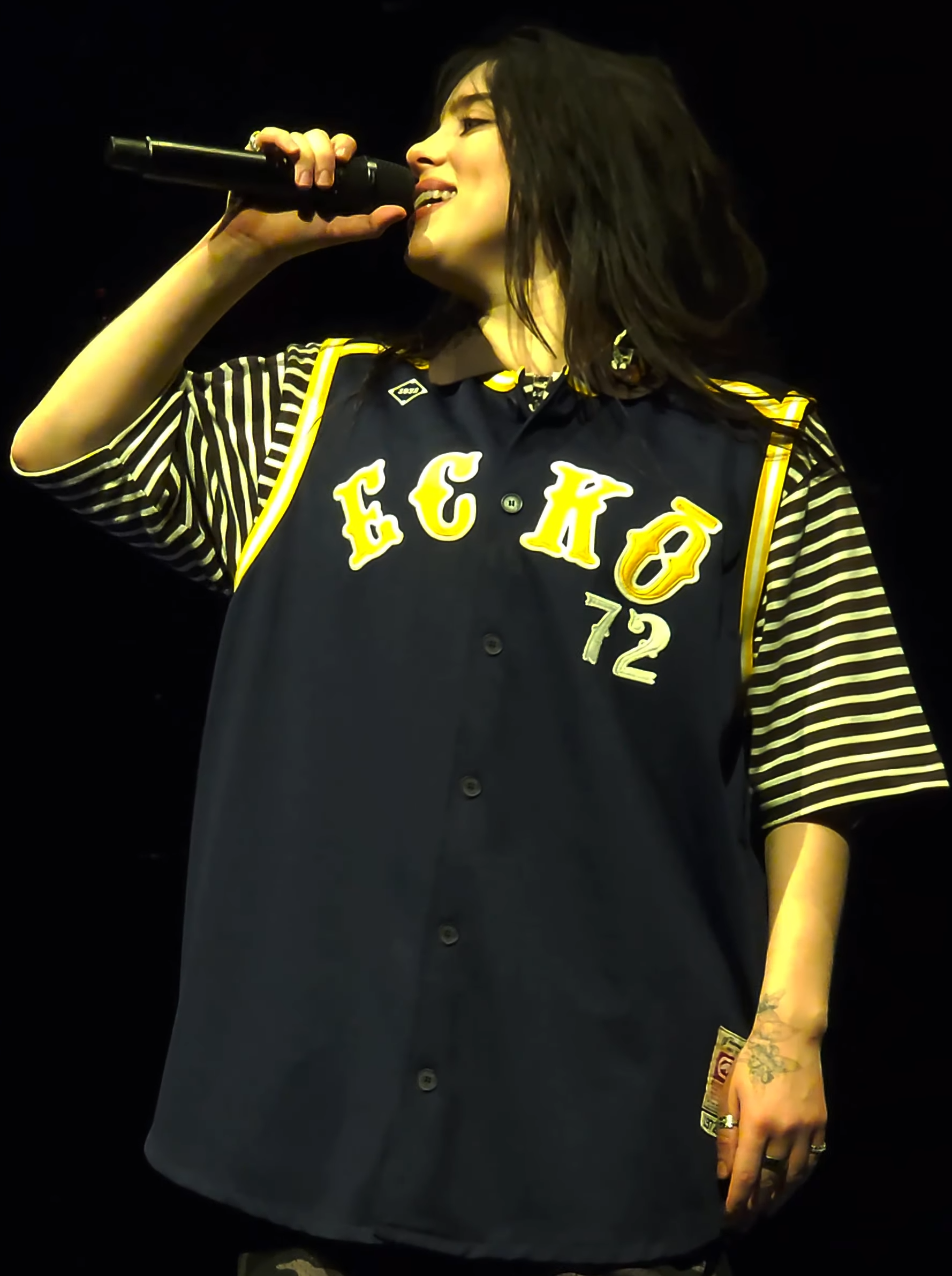
Pyramid Stage headliners Sam Fender, Harry Styles, and Billie Eilish.

Cher will perform in the iconic "Sunday Legends'" slot.

Headliners

- Sam Fender
- Harry Styles
- Billie Eilish
- Cher

Second tier performers

- Massive Attack
- Sombr
- Little Simz
- Chase & Status
- The xx
- Lily Allen
- Ezra Collective
- Kraftwerk

Other confirmed performers (A-Z)

- Adéla
- Angine de Poitrine
- Atarashii Gakko!
- The Avalanches
- Basement Jaxx
- Blood Orange
- Bonobo
- Christine and the Queens
- Chvrches
- Confidence Man
- Crowded House
- De La Soul
- Dinosaur Jr.
- Ecca Vandal
- Ellie Goulding
- Fat Freddy's Drop
- FKA Twigs
- Flo
- Florence Road
- Getdown Services
- Hot Chip
- Jamie T
- Josh Baker
- Kettama
- Prospa
- Kacey Musgraves
- Keo
- Kingfishr
- King Gizzard & the Lizard Wizard
- Leon Bridges
- Lianne La Havas
- Lola Young
- Mike D
- Moonchild Sanelly
- Nao
- Nia Archives
- Primal Scream
- Robyn
- Saint Etienne
- Sammy Virji
- Sienna Spiro
- Skye Newman
- Thee Sacred Souls
- The Streets
- Teddy Swims
- Texas
- Thundercat
- Tinariwen
- Underscores
- Underworld
- The War on Drugs
- Westside Cowboy
- The Womack Sisters
- Wunderhorse
- Young Fathers
