= Good Girl (Cloonee and Prospa song) =

Single by Cloonee and Prospa featuring Tristan Henry

from the album Are You Still You?
- Released: 24 July 2026
- Length: 3:01
- Label: Hellbent Records
- Songwriters: Dave Bissett; Harvey Blumler; Tristan Henry; Melynda Randel; Guiorgi Smith
- Producers: Prospa; Cloonee

Cloonee singles chronology
"I Rhyme Quick" (2026)	"Good Girl" (2026)	"Get Up and Dance" (2026)

Prospa singles chronology
"Dreams" (2026)	"Good Girl" (2026)	"Think of You" (2026)

"Good Girl" is a song by British producer Cloonee and electronic music duo Prospa featuring vocals from British Tristan Henry. The song was developed in March 2026 during Miami Music Week and follows the previous collaboration, "Free Your Mind". It was released on 24 July 2026 as the lead single from Cloonee's debut album, Are You Still You?.

== Reception ==
Rachel Narozniak from Beat Portal described the song as "hip-shakin' house groove and a topline that deals in soulful singularity".

== Charts ==
=== Weekly charts ===
Weekly chart performance
Chart (2026)	Peak position
Estonia Airplay (TopHit)	68
Ireland (IRMA)	38
Italy Airplay (EarOne)	78
Lebanon (Lebanese Top 20)	15
Netherlands (Single Tip)	12
New Zealand Hot Singles (RMNZ)	25
North Macedonia Airplay (Radiomonitor)	2
UK Singles (Official Charts)	22
UK Dance (Official Charts)	3
UK Independent (Official Charts)	5
US Dance Airplay (Billboard)	16
US Hot Dance/Electronic Songs (Billboard)	15

=== Monthly charts ===
Monthly chart performance
Chart (2026)	Peak position
Estonia Airplay (TopHit)	76
