= DJ Tennis =

Italian musician

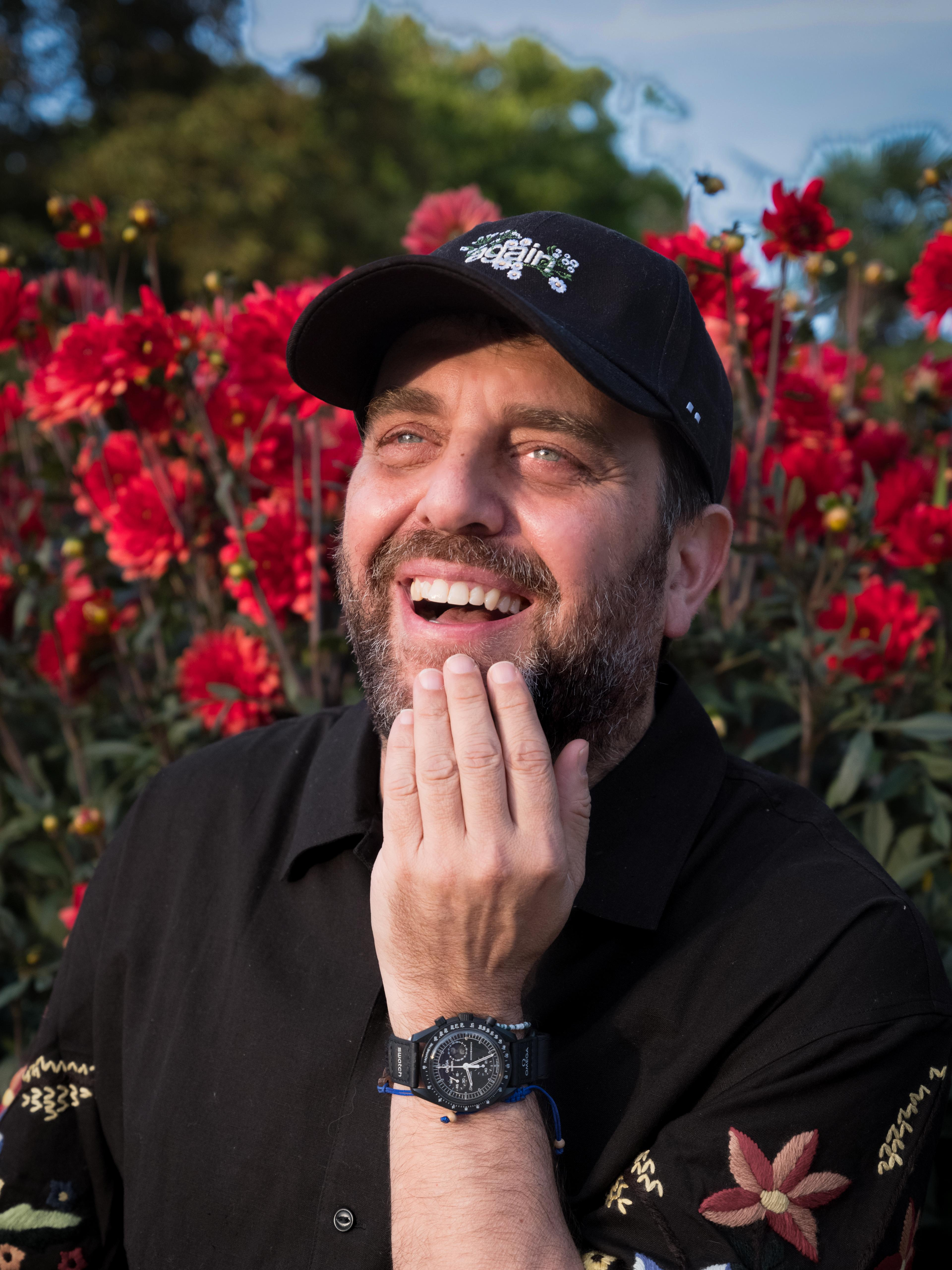

Background information
- Also known as: DJ Tennis, Redrago
- Born: Manfredi Romano; December 27, 1970 (age 55)
- Origin: Parma, Italy
- Genres: EDM, House, Tech House, Techno
- Occupations: DJ; Record Producer; Promoter; Artist Manager; Chef
- Years active: 2010 - present
- Labels: Life and Death - !K7 - Kompakt - Circoloco

Manfredi Romano (born 27 December 1970), known professionally as DJ Tennis, is an Italian electronic dance music DJ, music producer and label owner.

== Biography ==
Romano first studied computer science; at the same time, he also organized parties and band tours. In 1995, he founded the DJ booking agency Daze in Milan. In 2010, he founded the electronica label Life And Death with Greg Oreck.

DJ Tennis has performed in numerous festivals such as Burning Man, Electro Magnetic, Tomorrowland, EDC, Glastonbury, Dour, ADE and Time Warp.

DJ Tennis’ music has been released on Kompakt, Rhythm Assault, Running Back Records, !K7 Music, Cercle Records, AUS Music, Circoloco Records, other than having frequent his own releases on Life and Death. Tennis also remixed the likes of Diplo, Boys Noize, Loco Dice, WhoMadeWho, Acid Pauli and more.

In 2024, he launched a cooking show, Munchietown, with guests from the food and music world. Together with Carlita, Romano created the Astra Club, a musical experience that combines DJ sets and live shows.

== Discography ==
=== EPs ===
- 2016: Divisions Chirality [Life and Death]
- 2019: Gordon Starck [Running Back]
- 2022: Repeater [AUS]

=== Singles ===
- 2012: Make It Good [Life and Death]
- 2012: The Outcast (with Pillowtalk) [Kompakt]
- 2014: Local [Life and Death]
- 2016: Convex [Omnidisc]
- 2017: Certain Angles (with Fink) [!K7]
- 2020: Intercooler [Life and Death]
- 2021: Atlanta [Circoloco]
- 2021: On My Own Now (feat Ashee, Lady Donli) [Circoloco]
- 2022: Margaret (feat Sebra Cruz) [Life and Death]
- 2023: Take It, Take It [Cocoon]
- 2024: Dale Dale (feat Luke Alessi) [Life and Death]

=== Remixes ===
- 2015: Pupkulies & Rebecca - Pink Pillow (DJ Tennis Remix) [normoton]
- 2016: Trentemoller - Always Something Better (DJ Tennis & Mind Against Remix) [SLCTNS]
- 2016: Ludovico Einaudi - Elements (DJ Tennis Remix) [Decca]
- 2017: Tricky, Mina Rose - Running Wild (DJ Tennis Remix) [False Idols]
- 2017: Rebolledo - A Numb Gas to the Future (DJ Tennis Pimento Drive Version) [Hippie Dance]
- 2018: Keinemusik - You Are Safe (DJ Tennis Remix) [Keinemusik]
- 2018: George FitzGerald - The Echo Forgets (DJ Tennis Remix) [Domino Recordings]
- 2018: Daniele Baldelli - Gandharva (DJ Tennis Remix) [Mondo Groove]
- 2018: My Favourite Robot - Barricade (DJ Tennis Remix) [My Favourite Robot]
- 2019: Bob Moses - Nothing but You (DJ Tennis Remix) [Domino Recording]
- 2019: Loco Dice - Roots (DJ Tennis Remix) [Desolat]
- 2019: Maribou State - Nervous Tics (DJ Tennis Remix) [Counter Records]
- 2020: Kaz James, Ali Love - Stronger (DJ Tennis Remix) [Three Six Zero]
- 2020: Mr Tophat - Time Lapse feat. Noomi (DJ Tennis Disko Bang Club Mix) [Life and Death]
- 2021: Whomadewho - Mermaids (DJ Tennis Remix) [Embassy One]
- 2021: Kino Todo - Space Sum (DJ Tennis Remix) [Blue Shadow]
- 2022: Anfisa Letyago - Nisida (DJ Tennis Remix) [N:S:DA]
- 2022: Diplo & Damian Lazarus feat. Jungle - Don't Be Afraid (DJ Tennis & Carlita Remix) [Higher Ground]
- 2023: Pale Blue - No Words (DJ Tennis Remix) [Crosstown Rebels]
- 2023: Orofino - Amsterdam (DJ Tennis Remix) [Life and Death]
- 2023: Maceo Plex, AVNU - This Isn't Hollywood (DJ Tennis Remix) [Lone Romantic]
- 2023: mOat, Kyozo - Undertones (DJ Tennis Remix) [Armada Music]
- 2025: Röyksopp - What Else Is There? (ft. Fever Ray) (DJ Tennis Remix) [Dog Triumph]

=== Collaborations ===
- 2019: DJ Tennis, Red Axes (as Redrago) - Redrago [Life And Death]
- 2022: Carlita, DJ Tennis, Alex Metric - Cinecittà [Cercle Records]
- 2023: LP Giobbi, DJ Tennis, Joseph Ashworth - All In A Dream [Counter Records]

=== DJ Mix ===
- 2017: DJ-Kicks No 59
