= Carlita =

Carlita may refer to:

- Carlita (character), a fictional character in the children's show Gabby's Dollhouse
- Carlita (musician), a Turkish-Italian electronic music DJ and producer
