= Carlita (musician) =

Turkish-Italian electronic music producer and DJ

- Born: Carla Frayman; 1995 (age 30–31)
- Genres: House, techno, electronic
- Occupations: DJ, record producer
- Instrument: Synthesizer
- Years active: 2014–present
- Labels: Ninja Tune, Counter Records
- Website: Ninjatune.net/artist/carlita

Carla Frayman (better known by her stage name Carlita), is a Turkish-Italian DJ and musician. Her work blends elements of electronic music with a classical music background.

== Biography ==
Carlita was born in Istanbul, Turkey, to a Turkish father and Italian mother. She started playing the cello at the age of 8. She received formal education in classical music in Turkish Conservatory, and graduated from the Royal Academy of Music with the cello at 16 years old. Later, she learned to play the guitar and bass. At 12, Carla competed in Turkey's Got Talent and advanced to the semi-finals on national Turkish television. In interviews, she has emphasized her proficiency with multiple instruments, stating: "I play professionally — like at a good level — guitar, bass guitar, cello, piano, drums... I love drums. I can play most instruments, I feel, because I studied music theory for years."

Later she moved to Boston, where she attended Northeastern University. During her second year in Boston, she began making playlists for friends, which sparked her interest in being a DJ. A local club owner taught her how to use CDJs and offered her a residency at Bijou nightclub, marking the beginning of her DJ career. After graduating in 2017, she chose to pursue music professionally.

== Musical style and career ==
Carlita is known for her approach to electronic music. Her sound blends psychedelic and Turkish folk influences, combining genres such as house, downtempo, melodic techno, and organic rhythms. Her performances often incorporate a strong emotional narrative and visual identity, influenced by diverse cultural backgrounds.

She has performed at festivals and venues around the world, including Coachella, Burning Man, Tomorrowland, Awakenings, Sónar, Cercle, and Circoloco. She has also headlined events hosted by major electronic music publications, such as DJ Mag Presents at Dallas' It'll Do Club in 2023.

In 2023, she co-founded the multidisciplinary platform Senza Fine alongside DJ Tennis, combining music, fashion, and visual arts through curated live experiences.

In 2024, Carlita released her debut album Sentimental under Ninja Tune's sublabel Counter Records. The album was well received by music critics and showcased a wide range of sonic textures and collaborations.

== Discography ==
=== Studio albums ===
- Sentimental (2024, Ninja Tune / Counter Records)
- Telepathy (2026, Ninja Tune / Counter Records)

=== Singles ===
- "Ultra Violet" (Afterlife Records)
- "Zorro" Jaded & Carlita
- "Bon Trip" Extended Mix (2022, Life and Death)
- "Time" (2 April 2024, Counter Records)
- "Planet Blue" (2024, Counter Records)
- "Cash for Love" (2024, CircoLoco Records)
- "See It as a Sign" (featuring Myd)
- "Fell in Luv" (Black Circle remix)

=== Mixed compilations ===
- Fabric presents Carlita (April 2025, Fabric)

== Notable DJ sets and appearances ==
- Carlita at Cinecittà in Rome, Italy for Cercle (2022)
- Carlita at Tomorrowland 2023
