= Think of You (Kettama and Prospa song) =

Single by Kettama and Prospa
- Released: 16 October 2026
- Length: 3:24
- Label: Steel City Dance Discs
- Songwriters: Harvey Blumler; Evan Campbell; Guiorgi Smith
- Producers: Kettama; Prospa

Kettama singles chronology
"Look Out for Me" (2026)	"Think of You" (2026)

Prospa singles chronology
"Good Girl" (2026)	"Think of You" (2026)

"Think of You" is a song by electronic musicians Kettama and Prospa. The song was in development since May 2026 where it was teased in clubs and festivals, including at Lollapalooza in August 2026. The song was announced on 11 October and released on 16 October 2026. The song features uncredited vocals from Rohan Pinnock-Hamilton.

== Reception ==
Andrew Kane from EDM Tunes called the song "a perfect collision of raw slap and euphoric rave", saying "What makes 'Think of You' work so well is that neither camp compromised their core identity... it balances pure emotional melody with warehouse-ready percussion. The groove locks in from the jump and builds with enough raw low-end pressure to make any club sound system sweat.".

== Charts ==
Weekly chart performance for "Think of You"
Chart (2026)	Peak position
New Zealand Hot Singles (RMNZ)	8
UK Singles (Official Charts)	25
US Hot Dance/Electronic Songs (Billboard)	11
