= Prospa =

English electronic music duo

- Origin: Leeds, England, UK
- Genres: House; deep house; electronic dance
- Years active: 2013–present
- Label: Circoloco Records
- Members: Guiorgi "Gosha" Smith; Harvey Blumler

Prospa is an English electronic music duo consisting of Leeds-born Harvey Blumler and Guiorgi "Gosha" Smith.

== History ==
Bumler and Smith, both from Leeds, became friends as children. Blumler experimented with heavy dubstep sounds, while Smith stated that he used to not like dance music. Instead, he listened to metal guitar, jazz, and later, jazz hip hop. When Smith began producing music, jazz-inspired hip hop was the first genre he experimented with. The pair eventually found a mutual interest in dance music, and started producing together in 2013. They spent two years producing deep house, but stopped after they "fell out of love with the sound".

Prospa had its first major hit with "Prayer", released in October 2018. The song was picked up by Annie Mac who selected it for her "Hottest Record in the World" feature.

The pair have gone on to release their music under their own label "Rave Science", part of Polydor Records.

On June 5th 2026 the duo released their debut album "Free Your Mind" under Circoloco records

== Musical style ==
The pair experimented with different musical styles. Discussing their influences, the pair cite The Chemical Brothers and Daft Punk.

== Discography ==
=== Studio albums ===
List of albums, with selected details
| Title | Details | Peak chart positions | | | | |
| Title | Details | UK | AUS | IRE | NLD | SCO |
|---|---|---|---|---|---|---|
| Free Your Mind | Released: 5 June 2026; Label: CircoLoco | 24 | 51 | 52 | 67 | 86 |

=== EPs ===
List of EPs, with selected details
| Title | Details |
|---|---|
| Machines | Released: 2017; Label: Suah Records |
| Control the Party | Released: 2019; Label: Chaos |
| Feel It 92 | Released: October 2020; Label: Chaos |
| Rave Science Vol. 1 | Released: February 2021; Label: Chaos |
| Rave Science Vol. 2 | Released: November 2021; Label: Chaos |

=== Charted singles ===
List of charted singles, with selected chart positions
| Title | Year | Chart positions | | | | | | | | | Certification | EP/Album |
| Title | Year | UK | UK Sales | AUS | CAN | IRE | NLD | NZ Hot | US Dance | WW | Certification | EP/Album |
|---|---|---|---|---|---|---|---|---|---|---|---|---|
| "Prayer" | 2019 | — | 92 | — | — | — | — | 30 | — | — | | Non-album single |
| "Ecstasy (Over & Over)" | 2020 | 77 | 33 | — | — | — | — | 27 | — | — | BPI: Silver | Feel It 92 |
| "Want Need Love" | 2021 | — | 58 | — | — | — | — | 38 | — | — | | Non-album singles |
| "This Rhythm" (with Rahh) | 2024 | — | 33 | — | — | — | — | — | — | — | BPI: Silver | Non-album singles |
| "Don't Stop" | 2025 | — | 36 | — | — | — | — | — | — | — | | Non-album singles |
| "You Don't Own Me" (with Josh Baker and Rahh) | 2025 | 94 | 21 | — | — | — | — | — | — | — | | Non-album singles |
| "Love Songs" (featuring Kosmo Kint) | 2025 | — | 29 | — | — | — | — | — | — | — | | Free Your Mind |
| "Free Your Mind" (with Cloonee) | 2026 | 6 | 13 | 65 | 87 | 10 | 13 | 20 | 4 | 185 | BPI: Gold; ARIA: Gold | Free Your Mind |
| "Baby" (with Murda Beatz) | 2026 | 52 | 15 | — | — | 83 | — | 12 | 14 | — | | Free Your Mind |
| "Dreams" | 2026 | 84 | 37 | — | — | — | — | — | 9 | — | | Free Your Mind |
| "Good Girl" (with Cloonee and Tristan Henry) | 2026 | 22 | 29 | — | — | 38 | — (Note: "Good Girl" did not enter the Dutch Single Top 100, but peaked at number 12 on the Dutch Single Tip chart.) | 25 | 15 | — | | Are You Still You? |
| "Think of You" (with Kettama and Rohan Pinnock-Hamilton) | 2026 | 25 | — | — | — | — | — | 8 | 11 | — | | Non-album single |
"—" denotes recording did not chart in that territory.

=== Other charted songs ===
List of other charted songs, with selected chart positions, showing year released and album name
| Title | Year | Chart positions | EP/Album |
| Title | Year | UK Sales | EP/Album |
|---|---|---|---|
| "Break Free" (with Kettama) | 2026 | 67 | Free Your Mind |
| "Masterplan" | 2026 | 50 | Free Your Mind |
