= Ecstasy (Over & Over) =

Single by Prospa

from the album Feel It 92
- Released: 15 May 2020
- Length: 3:36
- Label: Chaos, Universal
- Songwriters: Harvey Blumler; Guiorgi Smith
- Producer: Prospa

Prospa singles chronology
"The One" (2020)	"Ecstasy (Over & Over)" (2020)	"The Thrill" (2020)

"Ecstasy (Over & Over)" is a song by English electronic music duo Prospa, released on 15 May 2020 as the third single of their extended play Feel It 92. The house and tech house song was written and produced by Prospa (Guiorgi Smith and Harvey Blumler), Cloonee (Dave Bissett), Sam Mack and Victor Simonelli, and produced by the artists of the track. The song peaked at number 77 on the UK singles chart.

Upon release, Prospa said "This track is very special to us, it's the one that most people have asked us about in our sets, one that we feel is a step forward in our sound yet still has our watermark. We hope everyone feels the love from this song in such a time."

== Reception ==
Cal McIntyre from Notion said "Wavering and pouring from their idiosyncratic beats and pulsating synths, 'Ecstasy (Over & Over)' is one idyllic track of euphoric raving as the track builds into its climax."

A OurCulture reviewer said "'Ecstasy' shines on punchy synths, rave-ready beats and dancing energy."

== Track listings ==
digital download

1. "Ecstasy (Over & Over)" - 3:36

digital download

1. "Ecstasy (Over & Over)" - 3:36
2. "Ecstasy (Over & Over)" (extended) - 5:49

digital download

1. "Ecstasy (Over & Over)" (Model Man remix) - 3:23
2. "Ecstasy (Over & Over)" (Model Man remix - extended) - 5:09

digital download

1. "Ecstasy (Over & Over)" (Special Request remix) - 3:29
2. "Ecstasy (Over & Over)" (Special Request remix - extended) - 5:40

digital download

1. "Ecstasy (Over & Over)" (India Jordan remix) - 3:24
2. "Ecstasy (Over & Over)" (India Jordan remix - extended) - 6:15

== Charts ==
Weekly chart performance for "Ecstasy (Over & Over)"
Chart (2020)	Peak position
New Zealand Hot Singles (RMNZ)	27
UK Singles (Official Charts)	6
UK Indie (Official Charts)	18

== Certifications ==
Certifications for "Ecstasy (Over & Over)"
Region	Certification	Certified units/sales
United Kingdom (BPI)	Silver	200,000^{‡}
^{‡} Sales+streaming figures based on certification alone.
