= Girlband! =

British rock band

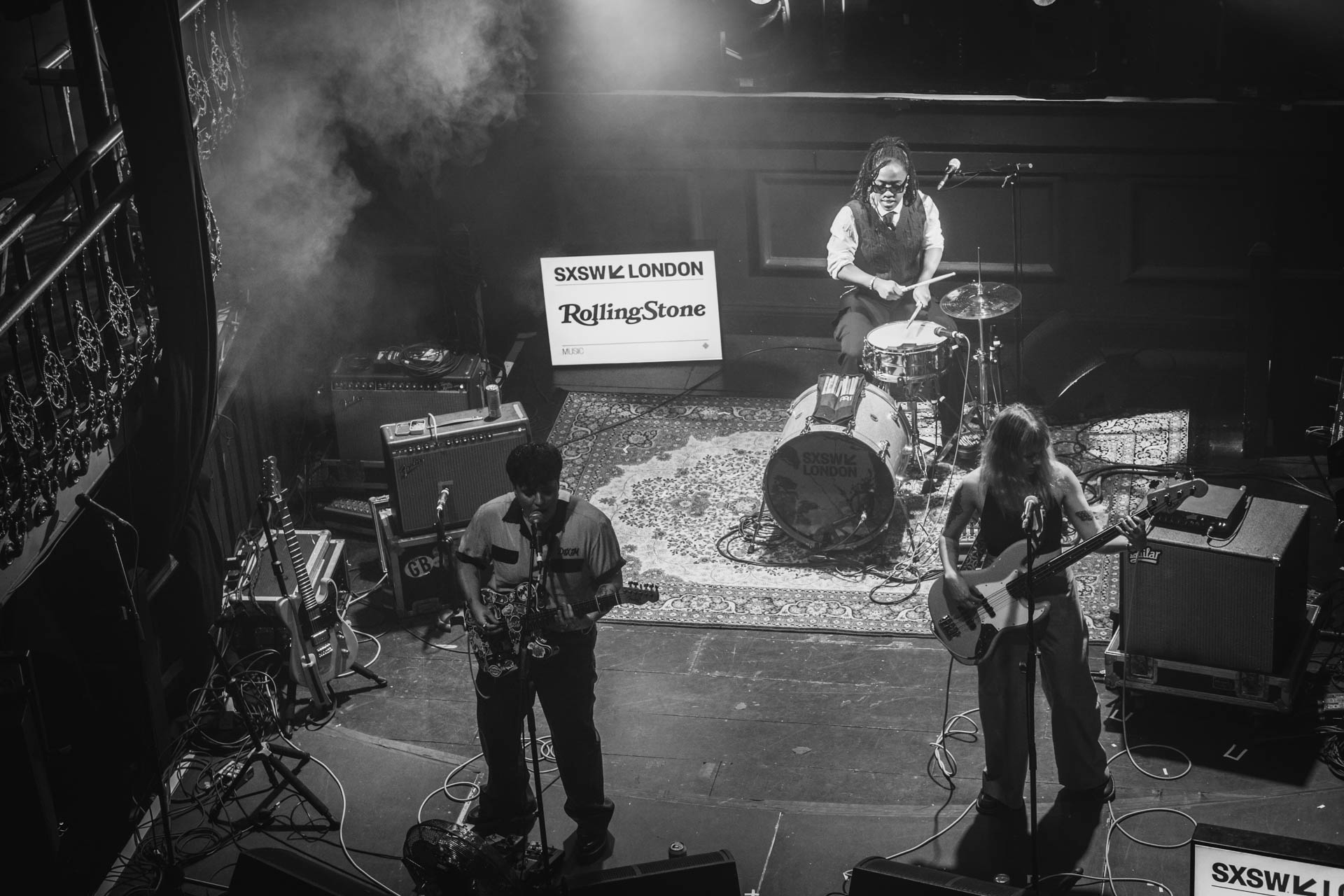
- Girlband! at South by Southwest London 2025

Background information
- Origin: Nottingham, England
- Genres: Rock
- Label: EMI North
- Members: Georgie (vocals); Kay (bass); Jada (drums)
- Website: girlbandhq.com

Girlband! (stylized in all caps) is a three-piece British rock band from Nottingham. As of April 2025, they are signed to EMI North. The band consists of singer Georgie, bassist Kay and drummer Jada.

== History ==
Kay has stated that she knew Georgie for 10 years before the band formed as they grew up in Nottingham, and that Kay and Jada were part of a jazz-funk band, Kay herself playing the flute. Georgie came to see Jada playing the drums, and they decided to form a band together. They spent a summer jamming,

In June 2023, the group played at Notts Pride. At the beginning of 2024, the band released their single "Not Like The Rest", and followed this up in July with the single "Heartbreak Town", about Mansfield, Georgie's home town. The Line of Best Fit noted the latter song's "jangly guitar sounds and buoyant rhythms", and Georgie's "grit-infused tone comparable to that of fellow profound female vocalists like Fiona Apple and Billy Nomates." This led up to the release of their first EP, also called Heartbeak Town.

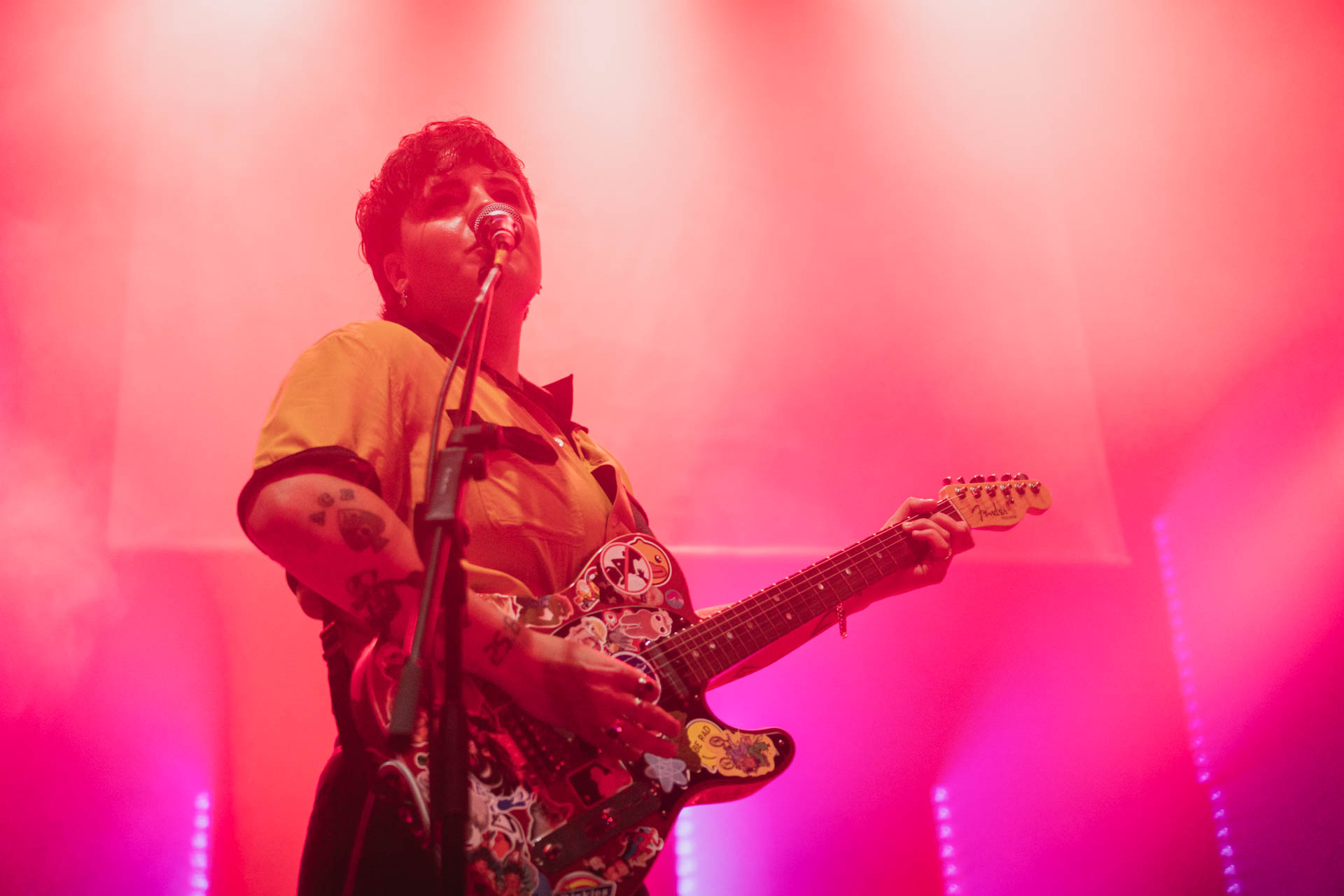
Georgie playing as part of Girlband! in 2025

The group went on a European tour supporting Destroy Boys in 2025. In April 2025, the group stated that the Swiss police had pulled them over in Switzerland as they were on their way to a headline show in Sion. The police held their tour manager, Mark Evans, at gunpoint and incorrectly accused him of human trafficking the band members, after a woman he had met at a petrol station reported them as such. They returned to Notts Pride. They also played live performances supporting Frank Carter and the Sex Pistols in London, and made a second appearance at Glastonbury Festival. In August, the group released the guitar-heavy single "Thelma & Louise", inspired by the film of the same name, and announced a partnership with gaming platform Avakin Life, featuring in its virtual Solar Live Festival.

== Artistry ==
Georgie has cited Joan Jett, The Breeders and Courtney Love as influences, whereas Jada has mentioned Nina Simone and Kay has pointed to Esperanza Spalding and Nik West.
