= Sun Green =

Song by Neil Young & Crazy Horse

from the album Greendale
- Released: August 19, 2003
- Recorded: July 11–September 19, 2002
- Genre: Rock
- Length: 12:03
- Label: Reprise
- Songwriter(s): Neil Young
- Producer(s): Neil Young; L.A. Johnson

"Sun Green" is a song by Neil Young & Crazy Horse from the 2003 album Greendale. The song is named after a character, played by Sarah White in the accompanying stage show and film. The song tells the story of Sun's increasing environmental activism, being arrested for possession of marijuana, meeting a young man named Earth Brown and deciding to go to Alaska with him.
