= Josh Baker (musician) =

British DJ and producer

- Origin: Manchester, England
- Genres: House; Tech house; Minimal
- Occupations: Record producer; DJ
- Years active: 2015–present
- Labels: You&Me, Baker's Dozen
- Website: joshbakermusic.co.uk

Josh Baker is a British musician, DJ and record producer from Manchester, England. In 2024, he was named Breakthrough Producer at the DJ Mag Best of British awards, and several of his singles have charted on the UK Singles Chart. He is a co-founder of the record label and events series You&Me and of the Hide & Seek festival, and the founder of the electronic music-production education platform Syntho.

== Career ==
Baker is from Manchester and specialises in house music. He was named Breakthrough Producer at the 2024 DJ Mag Best of British awards. Several of his singles have entered the UK Singles Chart, among them "Come Closer" (with Sienna Sophia), which reached number 48, and "Back It Up", which reached number 58. He has performed at festivals including Parklife, and in April 2026 appeared at the Coachella Valley Music and Arts Festival in California in a back-to-back set with Kettama and Prospa.

Baker has presented on BBC Radio 1 Dance on several occasions, including editions of The Residency, and in August 2025 he stood in for Pete Tong.

In 2026, Baker headlined a season-long residency at Amnesia, Ibiza, under his You&Me brand. and he released the single "My Place", a collaboration with the vocalist Poppy Baskcomb.

== Other ventures ==
Baker co-founded You&Me in 2015, initially as a student club night in Manchester, later developing it into a record label and events brand. In September 2025, You&Me marked its tenth anniversary with a takeover of The Warehouse Project in Manchester. In 2026, the brand held its first residency at Amnesia, Ibiza.

In 2019, Baker co-founded the Hide & Seek festival, a house and techno event that grew out of his You&Me parties in Manchester. Held annually, it has moved to larger venues, with the 2026 event taking place at Weston Park in Shropshire.

He is the founder of Syntho, a subscription-based online music-production education platform and community for electronic-music producers. It offers online courses and tutorials on electronic music production, along with personalised monthly feedback. As of 2025, the platform hosted more than 560 tutorials and courses and had users in over 73 countries

== Discography ==
=== Singles ===
List of singles, with selected chart positions
Title	Year	Peak chart positions		
Title	Year	UK	UK Sales	NZ Hot
"Bass Up to the Top"	2024	—	33	—
"Misleading"	2024	—	29	—
"Jam Is Pumping"	2024	—	46	—
"Back It Up" (with Omar+)	2025	58	—	—
"You Don't Own Me" (with Prospa and RAHH)	2025	94	—	—
"Dr Feel Right" (with the Egyptian Lover and Rome Fortune)	2025	61	—	—
"Come Closer" (with Sienna Sophia)	2025	48	—	—
"Subsonic"	2025	59	—	—
"Feel This Way" (with Silva Bumpa and Paige Cavell)	2026	84	—	—
"My Place" (with Poppy Baskcomb)	2026	52	35	28
"Breaking Point"			25	
