= Free Your Mind (Prospa album) =

2026 studio album by Prospa

Studio album by Prospa
- Released: 5 June 2026
- Length: 38:17
- Label: CircoLoco
- Producers: Prospa; Cloonee; Kettama; Murda Beatz; Cubeatz; Felix Leone; GINI

Prospa chronology
Close Your Eyes (2022)	Free Your Mind (2026)

Singles from Free Your Mind
- 1. "Love Songs" Released: 3 October 2025; 2. "Free Your Mind" Released: 27 March 2026; 3. "Baby" Released: 8 May 2026; 4. "Dreams" Released: 5 June 2026

Free Your Mind is the debut album by English electronic music duo Prospa. It was released on 5 June 2026 through CircoLoco.

== Background ==
Prospa announced the release of the album through an Instagram post on 27 March 2026. That same day, they would release the second single and title track "Free Your Mind" with Cloonee.

== Critical reception ==
Harold Heath of DJ Mag praised Blumler and Smith for "trusting in their musical chops, production approach, and obvious passion for dancing at the disco, to lead them in the right musical direction." He lauded the album as a glittering, euphoric, no-let-up collection of festival anthems. When the Horn Blows's Alexander Peters felt that Free Your Mind does not quite manage to capture the magic of a dance floor, as while there are genuine standouts on the album, the body of work as a whole leaves something to be desired.

== Track listing ==
Free Your Mind track listing
No.	Title	Writer(s)	Producer(s)	Length
1.	"Intro"	Guiorgi Smith; Harvey Blumler	Prospa	0:52
2.	"Love Songs" (featuring Kosmo Kint)	Smith; Blumler; Demetrius Don Subayar	Prospa	3:18
3.	"The Situation"	Smith; Blumler	Prospa	4:35
4.	"Free Your Mind" (with Cloonee)	Smith; Blumler; Dave Bissett; Sam Mack; Victor Simonelli	Prospa; Cloonee	3:21
5.	"Break Free" (with Kettama)	Smith; Blumler; Evan Campbell	Prospa; Kettama	4:06
6.	"Body Heat" (featuring Kosmo Kint)	Smith; Blumler; Subayar	Prospa	3:26
7.	"Masterplan"	Smith; Blumler	Prospa	3:46
8.	"Let the Music"	Smith; Blumler; Frederick Douglas Knight	Prospa	3:52
9.	"Party People" (with Nafe Smallz)	Smith; Blumler; Nathan Isaac Adams; Tom Did It	Prospa	3:52
10.	"Baby" (with Murda Beatz)	Smith; Blumler; Shane Lindstrom; Kevin Gomringer; Tim Gomringer; Donald Paton; Janina Franke	Prospa; Murda Beatz; Cubeatz; Felix Leone; GINI	3:13
11.	"Dreams"	Smith; Blumler	Prospa	3:56
Total length:				38:17

== Personnel ==
Musicians

- Prospa – songwriting (all tracks)
- Kosmo Kint – vocals (tracks 2, 6), songwriting (tracks 2, 6)
- Cloonee – songwriting (track 4)
- Sam Mack – songwriting (track 4)
- Victor Simonelli – songwriting (track 4)
- Kettama – songwriting (track 5)
- Frederick Douglas Knight – songwriting (track 8)
- Nafe Smallz – vocals (track 9), songwriting (track 9)
- Tom Did It – songwriting (track 9)
- GINI – vocals (track 10)
- Murda Beatz – songwriting (track 10)
- Cubeatz – songwriting (track 10)
- Donald Paton – songwriting (track 10)
- Janina Franke – songwriting (track 10)

Technical

- Prospa – production (all tracks)
- Cloonee – production (track 4)
- Kettama – production (track 5)
- Murda Beatz – production (track 10)
- Cubeatz – production (track 10)
- Felix Leone – production (track 10)
- GINI – production (track 10)
- Nathan Boddy – mixing (all tracks)

== Charts ==
Chart performance for Free Your Mind
Chart (2026)	Peak position
Australian Albums (ARIA)	51
Dutch Albums (Album Top 100)	67
Irish Albums (IRMA)	52
Irish Independent Albums (IRMA)	3
Lithuanian Albums (AGATA)	53
Scottish Albums (Official Charts)	86
UK Albums (Official Charts)	24
UK Dance Albums (Official Charts)	2
UK Independent Albums (Official Charts)	5
US Top Dance Albums (Billboard)	15

== Release history ==
Release dates and formats for Free Your Mind
Region	Date	Format(s)	Label	Ref.
Various	6 June 2026	CD; digital download; LP; streaming	CircoLoco	
