= Free Your Mind (Prospa and Cloonee song) =

Single by Prospa and Cloonee

from the album Free Your Mind
- Released: 27 March 2026
- Genre: House; tech house
- Length: 3:21
- Label: CircoLoco
- Songwriters: Guiorgi Smith; Harvey Blumler; Dave Bissett; Sam Mack; Victor Simonelli
- Producers: Prospa; Cloonee

Prospa singles chronology
| "Love Songs" (2025) | "Free Your Mind" (2026) | "Baby" (2026) |

Cloonee singles chronology
| "XTC" (2026) | "Free Your Mind" (2026) | "One Question" (2026) |

"Free Your Mind" is a song by English electronic music duo Prospa and English producer Cloonee, released by CircoLoco Records on 27 March 2026 as the second single of their debut studio album Free Your Mind. The house and tech house song was written by Prospa (Guiorgi Smith and Harvey Blumler), Cloonee (Dave Bissett), Sam Mack and Victor Simonelli, and produced by the artists of the track. The song reached the top 10 of the UK singles chart.

== Background ==
Cloonee revealed to British radio station Capital Dance that the original demo of the song had been created around 2020. Several years later, a power cut during a studio session with Prospa led him to search through his old projects on SoundCloud, among which was the demo of "Free Your Mind", which won the duo over. Cloonee then reworked the drums so that the track wouldn't sound dated, after which Prospa added a few elements, including some chords and layers of drums. Cloonee played the song during a back-to-back set with the duo at The Warehouse Project in England a few months before its release.

== Composition ==
"Free Your Mind" samples the song "Oh, How I Love You" by American singer-songwriter Sybil. Built around a four-on-the-floor beat and a layered structure, it was seen as being designed for both festivals and nightclubs, and was also featured in various DJ sets.

The track combines drums, basslines, an organ riff and a vocal hook. With a tempo of 128 beats per minute, the song centers on the chorus "Just free your mind, my love is what you'll find", accompanied by claps, kicks and a groovy sound, whilst the second verse features techno-inspired kicks and a bassline, with house-style keyboards. The production features elements characteristic of both artists, with Prospa providing the minimalist tech house structure and Cloonee the hook.

== Reception ==
Alexander Peters of When the Horn Blows called the song "a cut already primed for locked-in, hands-up moments all summer". In his review, he described the track's progression, writing: "the keys turn menacing, the groove becomes hypnotic, and a deep vocal narration pulls you further in before a female vocalist lifts the whole thing skyward". Rita Triplett of Sweet N Sour Magazine noted the chemistry between the artists, writing that the result is "successfully distilling the essence of 90s rave culture into a compact three-minute explosion". Katie Bain of Billboard felt that the song "drips with emotion about why dance music really means so much".

== Charts ==
Weekly chart performance for "Free Your Mind"
| Chart (2026) | Peak position |
|---|---|
| Australia (ARIA) | 65 |
| Australia Club Tracks (ARIA) | 11 |
| Belgium (Ultratop 50 Flanders) | 46 |
| Canada Hot 100 (Billboard) | 87 |
| Germany Dance (GfK) | 16 |
| Global 200 (Billboard) | 185 |
| Global Dance Radio (Billboard/WARM) | 1 |
| Greece International (IFPI) | 31 |
| Ireland (IRMA) | 10 |
| Italy (FIMI) | 67 |
| Lithuania (AGATA) | 40 |
| Netherlands (Dutch Top 40) | 20 |
| Netherlands (Single Top 100) | 13 |
| New Zealand Hot Singles (RMNZ) | 20 |
| Sweden Dance (Sverigetopplistan) | 20 |
| Switzerland (Schweizer Hitparade) | 69 |
| UK Singles (Official Charts) | 6 |
| UK Dance (Official Charts) | 1 |
| UK Independent (Official Charts) | 1 |
| US Dance Airplay (Billboard) | 1 |
| US Dance Airplay (Mediabase) | 1 |
| US Hot Dance/Electronic Songs (Billboard) | 4 |

== Certifications ==
Certifications for "Free Your Mind"
| Region | Certification | Certified units/sales |
|---|---|---|
| Australia (ARIA) | Gold | 35,000^{‡} |
| United Kingdom (BPI) | Gold | 400,000^{‡} |
^{‡} Sales+streaming figures based on certification alone.

== Release history ==
Release dates and formats for "Free Your Mind"
| Region | Date | Format | Label | Ref. |
|---|---|---|---|---|
| Various | 27 March 2026 | Digital download; streaming | CircoLoco | |
| Italy | 27 March 2026 | Radio airplay | CircoLoco | |

== See also ==
- List of UK Dance Singles Chart number ones of 2026
- List of UK Independent Singles Chart number ones of 2026
- List of UK top-ten singles in 2026
