= Circoloco =

Dance party

- Status: Active
- Genre: Club nights
- Frequency: Weekly on Mondays
- Venue: DC10; Various
- Country: Spain; Various
- Years active: 1999–present
- Founders: Antonio Carbonaro; Andrea Pelino
- Website: circolocoibiza.com

Circoloco is a dance party that is held at the DC10 nightclub in Ibiza, Spain, as well as other various locations globally. Circoloco features musical artists from the genres of electronic music, house music, and techno, such as The Martinez Brothers, Seth Troxler, Tale of Us, Black Coffee, and The Blessed Madonna. Sossa, Tania Vulcano, System Of Survival, Renè, Cirillo. The event was founded in 1999 by Italian promoters Andrea Pelino and Antonio Carbonaro, in conjunction with the DC10 nightclub.

To celebrate the 25th anniversary in 2024, "DC10 Ibiza CircoLoco Greatest Hits" was released.

== History ==
Circoloco was founded in July 1999 by Antonio Carbonaro and Andrea Pelino and was first hosted at the DC10 nightclub in Ibiza, Spain. Circoloco was first intended as an after-party hosted on Mondays after other events, such as the 24-hour event Space. Circoloco has hosted events in other locations, such as Los Angeles, Miami, New York City, and Tokyo. In 2018, a collaboration with the Italian clothing brand Off-White was released. Several CircoLoco events were canceled in 2020 due to the ongoing COVID-19 pandemic. In May 2021, Circoloco and American video game publisher Rockstar Games announced CircoLoco Records, a joint venture between the companies.

Over the years, CircoLoco evolved from a Monday event at DC10 in Ibiza into an international events series held in a number of cities.

Circoloco has traveled worldwide outside of Ibiza throughout the past number of years, with shows in some of the main cities such as New York, Miami, London, Milan, Paris, Amsterdam, Tel Aviv, Rio de Janeiro & Phuket to name but a few. Throughout the last two decades, Circoloco has been attended by a variety of well-known celebrities and influential individuals. Most recently, Leonardo DiCaprio attended their 2022 Halloween event in Brooklyn, New York.

Known for tapping DJs at the early stages of their career and platforming female DJs, who are often underrepresented on nightclub rosters, CircoLoco has amassed an intercontinental followers group following based on Carbonaro's approach to curating and booking acts. The 24-date run in the summer of 2022, the longest party season in CircoLoco history, saw performances from Peggy Gou, Blond:ish, and other industry veterans.

In 2024, Circoloco celebrated 25 years of parties with 25 weeks of shows at Ibiza's DC-10 nightclub. The opening night was covered by Dazed magazine and featured artists like Mochakk, Seth Troxler, Chloé Caillet, and Rampa.

== CircoLoco Records ==
CircoLoco Records
- Industry: Music
- Genre: Electronic music; House music; Techno
- Founded: 2021
- Owner: CircoLoco; Rockstar Games (Take-Two Interactive)
- Website: circolocorecords.com

CircoLoco Records is a record label founded as a joint venture between Circoloco and Rockstar Games and was announced on May 24, 2021. Artists associated with Circoloco and electronic music in general, such as Tale of Us, The Blessed Madonna, and Moodymann, have been previously featured in Grand Theft Auto Online, an online multiplayer game published by Rockstar Games. Songs from the Monday Dreamin' EPs can be listened to at fictional nightclubs and radio stations within the game, and some songs received remixes from Seth Troxler exclusive to the game's Los Santos Tuners update. Grand Theft Auto VI would later include a CircoLoco Records Radio station mostly featuring songs from the label’s catalog.

In July 2021 was the release of Skream's 'The Attention Deficit EP' — in collaboration with Jackmaster. The full EP was released on CircoLoco Records, on July 15. Both the lead tune and extended 'Terrace Mix' combines Italian vocal fragments with punchy drums to create an upbeat, infectious record.

Songs and albums released under the CircoLoco Records name are copyrighted by a Take-Two Interactive subsidiary; Rockstar Records, LLC.

=== Discography ===
Albums and singles released by CircoLoco Records
Name	Track listing	Release date
Lumartes (Extended)	No. / Title / Artist(s) / Length; 1. / "Lumartes" (Extended) / Seth Troxler / 8:28	24 May 2021
Monday Dreamin' Blue EP	No. / Title / Artist(s) / Length; 1. / "Lumartes" / Seth Troxler / 3:53; 2. / "Reverie" / Sama' Abdulhadi / 6:37; 3. / "The Church" / Rampa / 7:20; 4. / "Autonom" (Dixon Edit) / Deichkind, Dixon / 5:14; 5. / "You" / Kerri Chandler / 6:27	4 June 2021
Monday Dreamin' Green EP	No. / Title / Artist(s) / Length; 1. / "What If, Then What?" (featuring Amiture) / tINI / 4:52; 2. / "Atlanta" / DJ Tennis / 7:18; 3. / "Keep On Coming" (featuring CD) / Moodymann / 5:17; 4. / "Laser Lass" / Jamie Jones / 6:18; 5. / "As If To Say" / Mano Le Tough / 7:19	11 June 2021
Monday Dreamin' Violet EP	No. / Title / Artist(s) / Length; 1. / "Raindrops" (featuring Kemelion) / Butch / 5:48; 2. / "Forever Free" / Carl Craig / 8:25; 3. / "Wishing Well" / Margaret Dygas / 7:00; 4. / "Calib" / Red Axes / 6:45; 5. / "Mantra For Lizzie" / Luciano / 12:34	18 June 2021
Monday Dreamin' Black EP	No. / Title / Artist(s) / Length; 1. / "Revision Of The Past" / TOKiMONSTA, Lost Souls Of Saturn / 9:21; 2. / "Break It Up" / Adam Beyer / 5:45; 3. / "Nova Two" / Tale Of Us / 5:26; 4. / "Up In Flames" / Bedouin (DJ) / 6:54; 5. / "The Future" (featuring Robert Owens) / Damian Lazarus / 7:11	25 June 2021
Monday Dreamin'	No. / Title / Artist(s) / Length; 1. / "Revision Of The Past" / TONKiMONSTA, Lost Souls of Saturn / 9:21; 2. / "The Church" / Rampa / 7:20; 3. / "Keep On Coming" (featuring CD) / / 5:17; 4. / "Raindrops" (featuring Kemelion) / Butch / 5:48; 5. / "Wishing Well" / Margaret Dygas / 7:00; 6. / "Forever Free" / Carl Craig / 8:25; 7. / "Autonom" (Dixon Edit) / Deichkind, Dixon / 5:14; 8. / "Break It Up" / Adam Breyer / 5:45; 9. / "What If, Then What?" (featuring Amiture) / tINI / 4:52; 10. / "Laser Lass" / Jamie Jones / 6:18; 11. / "Lumartes" (Extended) / Seth Troxler / 8:28; 12. / "Nova Two" / Tale of Us / 5:26; 13. / "Reverie" / Sama' Abdulhadi / 6:37; 14. / "Mantra For Lizzie" / Luciano / 12:34; 15. / "Atlanta" / DJ Tennis / 7:18; 16. / "As If To Say" / Mano Le Tough / 7:19; 17. / "You" / Kerri Chandler / 6:27; 18. / "The Future" (featuring Robert Owens) / Damian Lazarus / 7:11; 19. / "Up In Flames" / Bedouin / 6:54; 20. / "Calib" / Red Axes / 6:45	25 June 2021
CircoLoco Records & NEZ Present CLR 002	No. / Title / Artist(s) / Length; 1. / "You Wanna?" / NEZ / 3:36; 2. / "Let's Get It" / NEZ, ScHoolboy Q / 2:47; 3. / "Freaks" / NEZ, Moodymann, Gangsta Boo / 2:56	25 February 2022
The Attention Deficit EP	No. / Title / Artist(s) / Length; 1. / "The Attention Deficit Track (Edit)" / Skream, Jackmaster / 3:49; 2. / "The Attention Deficit Track (Terrace Mix)" / Skream, Jackmaster / 6:15; 3. / "Floral" / Skream / 4:58; 4. / "Track 3" / Skream, Jansons / 5:53	15 July 2022
On My Own Now	No. / Title / Artist(s) / Length; 1. / "On My Own Now (feat. Lady Donli)" / DJ Tennis & Ashee / 3:49; 2. / "On My Own Now (feat. Lady Donli) [Extended]" / DJ Tennis & Ashee / 6:05; 3. / "On My Own Now (feat. Lady Donli) [Acid Dub]" / DJ Tennis & Ashee / 5:11	5 August 2022
IZA	No. / Title / Artist(s) / Length; 1. / "IZA (Edit)" / Map.ache / 4:40; 2. / "IZA" / Map.ache / 7:43	26 August 2022
NYWTF	No. / Title / Artist(s) / Length; 1. / "NYWTF feat. Mikhail Beltran (Edit)" / Chloé Caillet, Mikhail Beltran / 3:04; 2. / "NYWTF feat. Mikhail Beltran (Extended)" / Chloé Caillet, Mikhail Beltran / 5:46	14 October 2022
WORLD IS EMPTY	No. / Title / Artist(s) / Length; 1. / "WORLD IS EMPTY" / Skream, Jansons / 3:17; 2. / "WORLD IS EMPTY - EXTENDED" / Skream, Jansons / 7:20	4 November 2022
Know Now	No. / Title / Artist(s) / Length; 1. / "Chloé Caillet - Know Now FEAT. POTÉ - EDIT" / Chloé Caillet, POTÉ / 3:15	10 February 2023
Intro	No. / Title / Artist(s) / Length; 1. / "NYWTF feat. Mikhail Beltran" / Chloé Caillet, Mikhail Beltran / 3:04; 2. / "Know Now feat. Poté" / Chloé Caillet, Poté / 3:14; 3. / "In The Middle feat. Falle Nioke & Wekaforé" / Chloé Caillet, Falle Nioke, Wekaforé / 3:37; 4. / "Quieres (Part 1)" / Chloé Caillet / 4:35; 5. / "Quieres feat. Kaleta (Part 2)" / Chloé Caillet, Kaleta / 4:14; 6. / "NYWTF feat. Mikhail Beltran (Extended)" / Chloé Caillet, Mikhail Beltran / 5:46; 7. / "Know Now feat. Poté (Extended)" / Chloé Caillet, Poté / 4:11; Total length: / / / 18:46	12 May 2023
Jealous	No. / Title / Artist(s) / Length; 1. / "Jealous (Extended Mix)" / Mochakk / 5:45	25 August 2023
Cash For Love	No. / Title / Artist(s) / Length; 1. / "Cash For Love (Extended Mix)" / Carlita / 6:32	26 January 2024
If You Want My Loving	No. / Title / Artist(s) / Length; 1. / "If You Want My Loving" / Prospa / 4:10	12 April 2024
Locomotiva Ibiza 2099 I	No. / Title / Artist(s) / Length; 1. / "Locomotiva Ibiza 2099" / Mochakk & VTSS / 6:39; 2. / "The Line" / Mochakk / 6:50; 3. / "Locomotiva Ibiza 2099 (Dub Mix)" / Mochakk / 6:24	26 July 2024
Locomotiva Ibiza 2099 II	No. / Title / Artist(s) / Length; 1. / "No Boys Allowed (OG House Mix)" / Mochakk & Tommy Genesis / 5:52; 2. / "Estribeira" / Mochakk & Artisian / 5:03; 3. / "No Boys Allowed (Street Mix)" / Mochakk / 3:58	6 September 2024
Collect The Commas	No. / Title / Artist(s) / Length; 1. / "Collect The Commas (Extended Mix)" / Pawsa / 6:52	4 October 2024
This Rhythm	No. / Title / Artist(s) / Length; 1. / "This Rhythm (feat. RAHH) (Extended Mix)" / Prospa / 4:18	8 November 2024
Dreamachine	No. / Title / Artist(s) / Length; 1. / "Dreamachine" / Hiver / 5:06; 2. / "Dreamachine (Gerd Janson Extended Remix)" / Hiver, Gerd Janson / 3:48	21 February 2025
Don't Stop	No. / Title / Artist(s) / Length; 1. / "Don't Stop (Extended Mix)" / Prospa / 2:27	11 April 2025
Float	No. / Title / Artist(s) / Length; 1. / "Float (feat. BAYLI) (Extended Mix)" / Sparrow & Barbossa / 2:54	23 May 2025

== CircoLoco X Adidas Originals ==
CircoLoco X Adidas Originals
- Industry: Fashion
- Genre: Electronic music; House music; Techno
- Founded: 1949
- Owner: CircoLoco; Adidas Originals
- Website: www.adidas.com/us/circoloco

On July 25, 2022, Circoloco and Adidas collaborated to create the adidas x Circoloco Forum Lo sneaker and adidas x Circoloco adilette slide.

The two-shoe drop presents CircoLoco's take on adidas' Forum Lo sneaker and adilette slides. Both of the designs take inspiration from the Ibiza nightclub with CircoLoco's distinctive red and black coloring.

The footwear collaboration was revealed Monday July 25, as CircoLoco celebrated the 23rd birthday of its weekly residency at Ibiza's DC10.

CircoLoco invited adidas Originals to design their clown logo for their anniversary party, which stars the likes of Keinemusik's &Me and Rampa, Black Coffee, Peggy Gou, Seth Troxler, Gerd Janson, TSHA, Luciano and more.
