= List of number-one albums of 2015 (Netherlands) =

The Dutch Albums Chart ranks the best-performing albums in the Netherlands, as compiled by GfK Dutch Charts.

Issue date	Album	Artist	Reference
3 January	x	Ed Sheeran	
10 January	x	Ed Sheeran	
17 January	x	Ed Sheeran	
24 January	Rivals	Kensington	
31 January	United We Are	Hardwell	
7 February	Recht uit m'n hart – Ballades	Jan Smit	
14 February	Recht uit m'n hart – Ballades	Jan Smit	
21 February	All in Good Time	Racoon	
28 February	All in Good Time	Racoon	
7 March	7 Layers	Dotan	
14 March	Rebel Heart	Madonna	
21 March	Tracker	Mark Knopfler	
28 March	Tracker	Mark Knopfler	
4 April	Reason	Selah Sue	
11 April	Shades of Black	Kovacs	
18 April	Better Than Home	Beth Hart	
25 April	Achter glas	Boudewijn de Groot	
2 May	Achter glas	Boudewijn de Groot	
9 May	Wilder Mind	Mumford & Sons	
16 May	Mijn muziek, mijn passie	Django Wagner	
23 May	Pass It On	Douwe Bob	
30 May	Kenny B	Kenny B	
6 June	Voorbij de horizon	Ancora	
13 June	Drones	Muse	
20 June	Drones	Muse	
27 June	En hoe het dan ook weer dag wordt	Maaike Ouboter	
4 July	En hoe het dan ook weer dag wordt	Maaike Ouboter	
11 July	Liefde is leven	Henk Bernard	
18 July	Liefde is leven	Henk Bernard	
25 July	Currents	Tame Impala	
1 August	Amused to Death	Roger Waters	
8 August	Blood	Lianne La Havas	
15 August	Compton	Dr. Dre	
22 August	Compton	Dr. Dre	
29 August	Compton	Dr. Dre	
5 September	Toppers In Concert 2015 – Crazy Summer	Gerard, Jeroen & René	
12 September	The Book of Souls	Iron Maiden	
19 September	Toppers in Concert 2015 – Crazy Summer	Gerard, Jeroen & René	
26 September	Open	Nick & Simon	
3 October	II	The Common Linnets	
10 October	In Dream	Editors	
17 October	Morgen	Guus Meeuwis	
24 October	Raar maar waar – 36	Kinderen voor Kinderen	
31 October	Sounds Good Feels Good	5 Seconds of Summer	
7 November	Embrace	Armin van Buuren	
14 November	Greatest Hits	Anouk	
21 November	Purpose	Justin Bieber	
28 November	25	Adele	
5 December	25	Adele	
12 December	25	Adele	
19 December	25	Adele	
26 December	25	Adele	
