= Devil Pray =

Song by Madonna

from the album Rebel Heart
- Released: December 20, 2014
- Recorded: 2014
- Genre: Technofolk; EDM; electro
- Length: 4:05
- Label: Interscope
- Songwriters: Madonna Ciccone; Tim Bergling; Arash Pournouri; Carl Falk; Rami Yacoub; Savan Kotecha; Dacoury Natche; Michael Tucker
- Producers: Madonna; Avicii; DJ Dahi; Michael Diamonds

Rebel Heart track listing
- 24 tracks: 1. "Living for Love"; 2. "Devil Pray"; 3. "Ghosttown"; 4. "Unapologetic Bitch"; 5. "Illuminati"; 6. "Bitch I'm Madonna"; 7. "Hold Tight"; 8. "Joan of Arc"; 9. "Iconic"; 10. "HeartBreakCity"; 11. "Body Shop"; 12. "Holy Water"; 13. "Inside Out"; 14. "Wash All Over Me"; Deluxe edition: 15. "Best Night"; 16. "Veni Vidi Vici"; 17. "S.E.X."; 18. "Messiah"; 19. "Rebel Heart"; Media Markt deluxe edition: 20. "Auto-Tune Baby"; Super deluxe edition (Disc 2): 1. "Beautiful Scars"; 2. "Borrowed Time"; 3. "Addicted"; 4. "Graffiti Heart"

Licensed audio
- "Madonna - Devil Pray (Official Audio)" on YouTube

"Devil Pray" is a song recorded by American singer and songwriter Madonna for her thirteenth studio album, Rebel Heart (2015). It was written and produced by Madonna, Avicii, DJ Dahi, and Michael Diamond (BloodPop), with additional writing by Arash Pournouri, Carl Falk, Rami Yacoub, and Savan Kotecha. During the early stages of the album, Madonna was encouraged by her manager to work with Avicii and his team of songwriters. Together, they worked on seven songs and "Devil Pray" was composed after Madonna desired to talk about her experiences with drugs and quest for spirituality. Lyrically, the song deals with themes of drug addiction, sin, temptation, and the desire for salvation.

"Devil Pray" is a techno-folk song, which combines elements of country-pop and has similarities with Madonna's own single "Don't Tell Me", Avicii's previous work and The Animals' version of the traditional folk song "The House of the Rising Sun". The song received high praise from critics for its musical elements, while also being highlighted for its self-conscious lyrics. However, there was some criticism towards the list of drugs used in the chorus. Following its release as a pre-ordered song from Rebel Heart, the song charted in many European territories, reaching the top-25 in Finland, Greece, Hungary and Lebanon. Madonna performed the song for the first time on the Italian TV show Che tempo che fa, wearing a black robe and various rosaries, and on her 2015–16 Rebel Heart Tour.

== Background and release ==
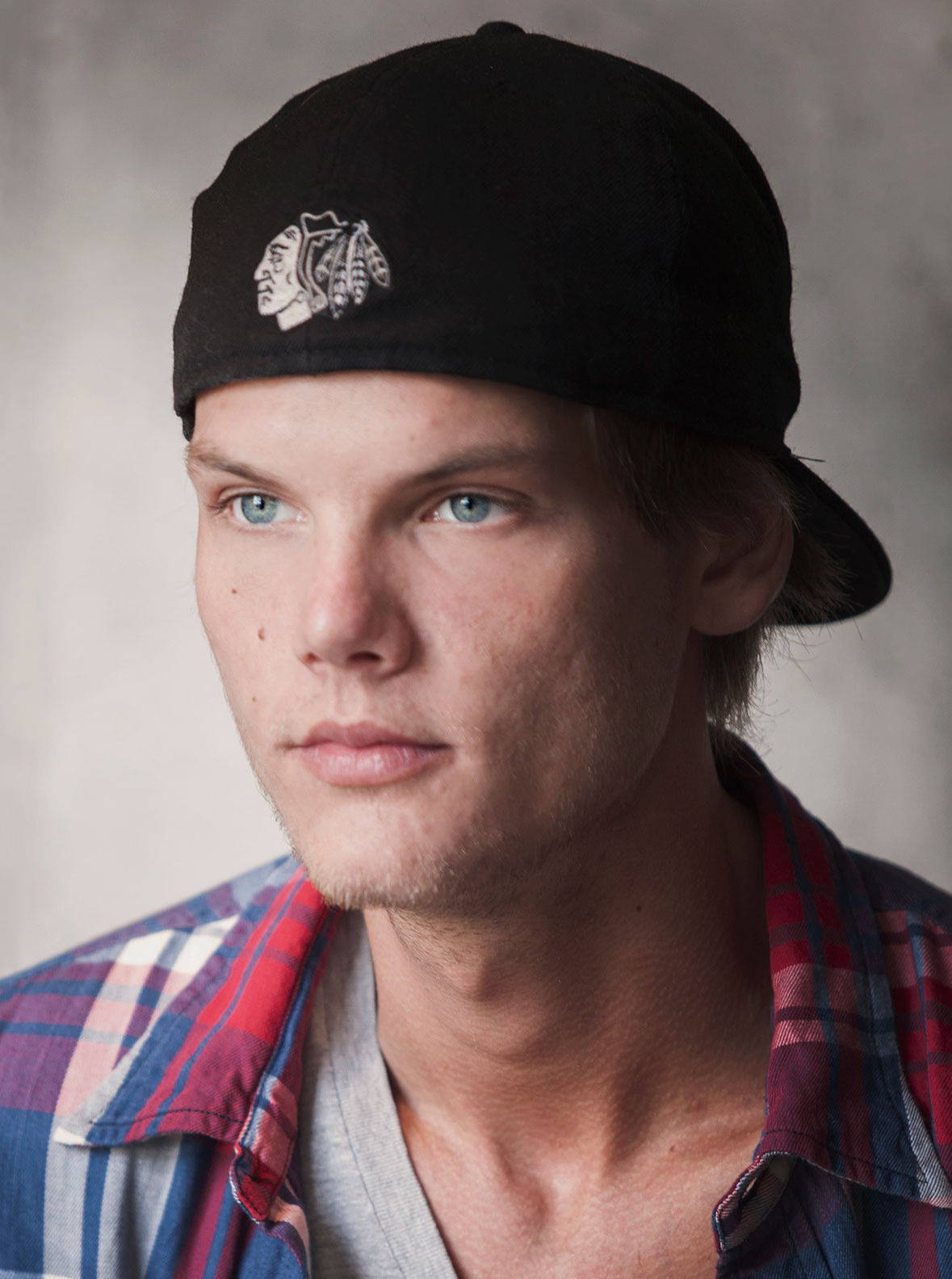
Avicii co-wrote and co-produced the song.

Madonna and Avicii first met in 2012 when the singer appeared on the Ultra Music Festival to premiere a remix of her single "Girl Gone Wild", produced by the DJ. Later, while developing her then-upcoming album, Madonna's manager Guy Oseary suggested the singer to work with Avicii's songwriting team; the singer accepted since she was a fan of Avicii's work. On March 7, 2014, the singer posted a picture of herself on her Instagram account with the caption, "Doing some house work before heading to the studio with Avicii." A week later, she posted photos with Avicii and his team of songwriters, claiming that they did "so many great songs". In an interview with David Blaine for Interview, Madonna said of the song:

It's about how people take drugs to connect to God or to a higher level of consciousness. I keep saying, 'Plugging into the matrix'. If you get high, you can do that, which is why a lot of people drop acid or do drugs, because they want to get closer to God. But there's going to be a short circuit, and that's the illusion of drugs, because they give you the illusion of getting closer to God, but ultimately they kill you. They destroy you. I mean, I tried everything once, but as soon as I was high, I spent my time drinking tons of water to get it out of my system. As soon as I was high, I was obsessed with flushing it out of me. I was like, 'OK, I'm done now'.

In the same interview, she said the song was not written to anyone in particular and that she was merely sharing her experiences. Rolling Stone published an article in which Madonna advocated "intense personal exploration" over drug use. While being asked if "Devil Pray" could run the risk of being misunderstood as a song encouraging drugs, Madonna replied: "I'm certainly not judging people who take drugs or saying 'don't do drugs', however, I'm saying you can do all of these things to connect to a higher level, but ultimately you're going to be lost. People who are getting high are instinctively also trying to connect to a higher level of consciousness, but are doing it in a way that will not sustain them."

The demo version of "Devil Pray" leaked onto the Internet in December 2014, alongside 12 other demos from the upcoming album. Following this Madonna released the album, titled Rebel Heart, for pre-order on December 20, 2014. When ordered, the first six tracks were automatically downloaded, including "Devil Pray". Madonna stated that the songs were meant to be "an early Christmas gift" and added that she would prefer her fans hear the completed versions of some of the songs instead of the incomplete tracks that were circulating.

== Recording and composition ==
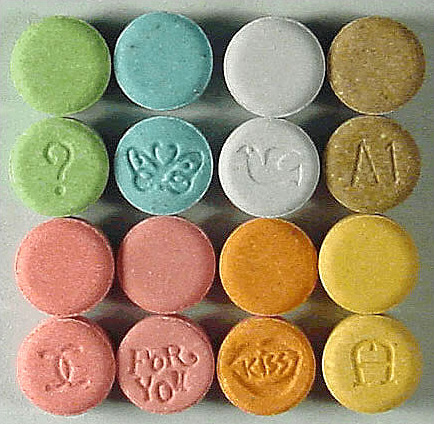
The lyrics of "Devil Pray" talk about consuming psychoactive drugs like MDMA (ecstasy).

"Devil Pray" was written and produced by Madonna, Avicii, DJ Dahi and Michael Diamonds, with additional writing done by Savan Kotecha, Carl Falk, Rami Yacoub and Arash Pournouri. Avicii and Falk were also responsible for providing keyboards and programming, with Falk also providing guitars. Additional recording and mixing was done by Angie Teo, while Demacio "Demo" Castellon was the song's engineer and mixer. "Devil Pray" has been described as a "moody mid-tempo semi-acoustic pop", techno-folk, "lite-EDM" and "acoustic guitar-with-electro-cowboy" song about overcoming addiction, with a more "country-tinged" and "folksy" style in comparison to other tracks on the album. Critics found similarities between the song and Madonna's own single "Don't Tell Me" (2000) for its "country-pop elements" and the traditional folk song "The House of the Rising Sun", due to its "bluesy-vibe".

"Devil Pray" brings Madonna "as a devoted disciple, drawn to a darker kind of prayer", as noted by The Quietus's Amy Pettifer, and its story deals with sin, temptation and deliverance. The song starts with hand claps and guitar, "whose country edge is [...] characteristic of Swedish producer Avicii's own output", claimed Pettifer. The chorus contains "an intoned, warning list of narcotic distractions" that "offer brief relief", as she sings, "And we can do drugs, and we can smoke weed, and we can drink whiskey / Yeah, we can get high, and we can get stoned / And we can sniff glue, and we can do E, and we can drop acid."

During the second verse, Madonna "seems to understand her own spiritual plight when she sings [...], 'Mother Mary, can't you [help] me? / 'Cause I've gone astray / All the angels that were around me / Have all flown away'," before warning, "Lucifer is near". Later, she advises that although providing brief relief, the use of those drugs will not provide any positive effect on the user, warning, "Yeah, we can run and we can hide / But we won't find the answers" and invite them to "get help" for making the "devil pray". Then, a "pitched down" voice joins in a "plea for [her] soul to be saved". As she sings, "Ooh, save my soul, save my soul, save my / Devil's here to fool ya", a "bed of throaty, orgasmic samples rises in the mix", and "a hundred tiny Madonna-voices in coital abyss."

== Critical reception ==
"Devil Pray" received mostly positive response from music critics. While noting that the song "reaches back smartly, not only to the hoe-down pop of [her single] 'Don't Tell Me', but to the subject matter, and bluesy gait of 'The House of the Rising Sun'", Jim Farber of New York Daily News praised "[t]he addition of a pulsing house beat [that] gives it yet another lure." Bernard Zuel of Sydney Morning Herald also found similarities in "Devil Pray" with both songs, defining it as an "acoustic guitar-with-electro-cowboy" song, whose melody "doesn't attempt to hide its familiarity with 'House of the Rising Sun'." The Huffington Post's Matthew Jacobs pointed out that Madonna evoked "the more traditional dance palate for which she is known." Jamieson Cox of Time enthusiastically wrote that the song "could fit in neatly on the radio beside this year's British house-pop crossovers and Avicii's own 'Hey Brother'." Andy Gill of The Independent found that "Devil Pray" recalled "the career-apex achievements of 'Like a Prayer', while Gavin Haynes of NME opined that the song is "reminiscent of Lady Gaga's crazed 2013 dance tune 'Aura'."

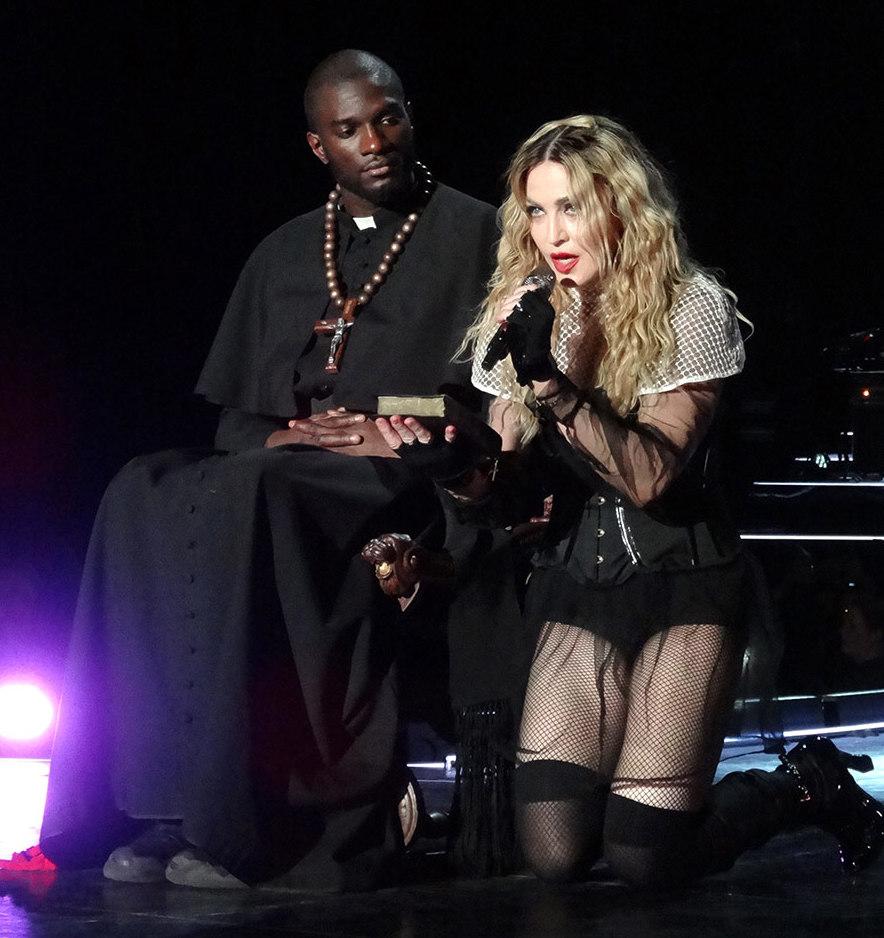
Madonna performing "Devil Pray" during the Rebel Heart Tour

Stephen Thomas Erlewine of AllMusic picked it as one of Rebel Heart's best songs, calling it "an expert evocation of her folktronica Y2K." Caryn Ganz of Rolling Stone agreed, noting that "Avicii helps Madonna revive the strums-and-beats vibe of 2000's Music." Sal Cinquemani of Slant Magazine went further, calling it "her best song in 15 years". He continued praising "Devil Pray" for "reimagin[ing] The Animals as a folktronica band with witch-house tendencies... Her ruminations on salvation and the existential pitfalls of sniffing glue [that] rid[es] an unexpected low-end groove." Annie Zaleski of The A.V. Club also saw the song as a highlight, describing it as a "gospel-tinged, acoustic-guitar irresistible plea for salvation and divine guidance in the face of temptations such as drugs." Sasha Geffen of Consequence of Sound considered "Devil Pray" one of Madonna's best release in years and its chorus as "one of her strongest in decades". She praised "Madonna's voice [which] is pitch-shifted into a ghostly echo — and unlike those 'Bitch' beats, the production slides in perfectly. It's one hell of a song about getting fucked up on every molecule imaginable, but it's also heavy with the longing for self-purification and direction." The New York Times also shared this view, noting that the song "showcase[s] some of Madonna's best singing in years." Saeed Saeed of The National felt that the song was similar to The Animals' version of "The House of the Rising Sun" and praised it for being a better country–dance song than Madonna's cover of Don McLean's "American Pie".

However, there were some criticism directed at the list of drugs used in the chorus of "Devil Pray". Chris Richards from The Washington Post criticized the fact that the "lyrics on Rebel Heart feel almost violently resistant to wisdom", citing the menu of intoxicants used in the chorus and asking, "Which one will best help us forget that this is happening?" Andrew Unterberger of Spin also wrote about the "laundry list of intoxicants" referenced in the song, noting that it "makes 'Devil Pray' sound like a mid-80s PSA." Jessica Hopper of Pitchfork Media went on to criticize the list for being "a strange, tender, comical thing, [...] but ultimately, it's a boring stadium-throb lite-EDM song about seeking sobriety and/or big-G, God. It's also a Madonna-doing-Madonna cliche [sic], which is too often the downfall of Rebel Heart." Alexis Petridis of The Guardian was negative about "Devil Pray"'s production, claiming that "[it's] a pretty transparent attempt by Avicii to come up with something along the lines of his hit 'Wake Me Up'."

== Chart performance ==
"Devil Pray" charted in many European territories after its release along with the other album's five tracks, on December 20, 2014. The song reached the top-ten in Greece and Hungary, peaking at numbers 9 and 10, respectively, while in Finland, Lebanon and Sweden, "Devil Pray" managed to reach the top-twenty, reaching numbers 16, 18 and 14. In Spain, the song reached number 50 and was the album's lowest charting song, while in France, "Devil Pray" was the third highest charting song, after "Living for Love" and "Ghosttown", the album's first and second single respectively, and peaked at number 62 with over 800 downloads.

== Live performances ==
On March 1, 2015, Madonna performed the song for the first time on Italian TV show, Che tempo che fa, along with "Ghosttown", the album's second single. An episode featuring her appearance was aired on March 8. For the performance of "Devil Pray", Madonna wore "an extravagant black robe and various rosaries." A writer for Yahoo! noticed that both performances were warmly received by the audience, while Lionel Nicaise appreciated that Madonna put more emphasis on the melodies and her vocals during the performance, rather than costumes and stage props. Bianca Grace of Idolator noted that the performance "will have you repenting your weekend sins, as the singer emotionally sings the tune." "Devil Pray" was performed on Madonna's 2015–16 Rebel Heart Tour. Following the Last Supper-themed mashup performance of "Holy Water" and "Vogue", Madonna climbed down to the center stage to perform "Devil Pray"; during the performance she straddled one of her male dancers, who was dressed as a priest, and engaged in a dance-off with other dancers. Jordan Zivitz from the Montreal Gazette said that she found the performance to be "challenging". Previous to this the song was also used for promotional videos related to the tour's rehearsals and dancer interviews. The performance of "Devil Pray" at the March 19–20, 2016 shows in Sydney's Allphones Arena was recorded and released in Madonna's fifth live album, Rebel Heart Tour.

== Credits and personnel ==
=== Management ===
- Webo Girl Publishing, Inc. (ASCAP) / EMI Blackwood Music Inc. (BMI) / EMI Music Publishing Scandinavia AB (STIM) / Sony/ATV Songs LLC (BMI)
- Sony/ATV Scandinavia AB (STIM) / Team 2101 Songs (ASCAP) / Rami Productions AB (ASCAP) / Kobalt Songs Music Publishing
- Sony/ATV Sonata and Dahi Productions (SESAC) / Michael Tucker Music (ASCAP) c/o Kobalt Songs Music Publishing / These Are Songs of Pulse (ASCAP) / OWSLA Trax (ASCAP)

=== Personnel ===
- Madonna – vocals, songwriter, producer
- Avicii – songwriter, producer, keyboards, programming
- DJ Dahi – songwriter, producer
- Jimmy Austin – songwriter
- Blood Diamonds – songwriter, producer
- Arash Pournouri – songwriter
- Carl Falk – songwriter, keyboards, guitars, programming
- Rami Yacoub – songwriter
- Savan Kotecha – songwriter
- Demacio "Demo" Castellon – engineer, mixer
- Nick Rowe – engineer
- Angie Teo – additional recording, additional mixing

Personnel adapted from Madonna official website.

== Charts ==
| Chart (2014–2015) | Peak position |
|---|---|
| Belgium (Ultratip Bubbling Under Wallonia) | 80 |
| Finland Download (Latauslista) | 16 |
| France (SNEP) | 62 |
| Greece Digital Songs (Billboard) | 9 |
| Hungary (Single Top 40) | 10 |
| Italy (FIMI) | 43 |
| Lebanon (The Official Lebanese Top 20) | 18 |
| Spain (Promusicae) | 50 |
| Sweden (DigiListan) | 14 |
| Switzerland (Schweizer Hitparade) | 59 |
