= Rebel Heart =

2015 studio album by Madonna

- Digital and deluxe edition cover

Studio album by Madonna
- Released: March 6, 2015
- Recorded: 2014
- Genre: Pop
- Length: 55:06
- Label: Interscope
- Producers: Madonna; Diplo; Ariel Rechtshaid; Avicii; Blood Diamonds; Billboard; Jason Evigan; Shelco Garcia & Teenwolf; Kanye West; Mike Dean; Toby Gad; Afsheen; Josh Cumbee; Salem Al Fakir; Symbolyc One; Magnus Lidehäll; Vincent Pontare; Astma & Rocwell; Carl Falk; Sophie Xeon

Madonna chronology
MDNA World Tour (2013)	Rebel Heart (2015)	Rebel Heart Tour (2017)

Singles from Rebel Heart
- 1. "Living for Love" Released: December 20, 2014; 2. "Ghosttown" Released: March 13, 2015; 3. "Bitch I'm Madonna" Released: June 15, 2015; 4. "Hold Tight" Released: July 24, 2015

Rebel Heart is the thirteenth studio album by American singer-songwriter Madonna, released by Interscope Records on March 6, 2015. She worked on the album throughout 2014, co-writing and co-producing it with musicians including Diplo, Sophie Xeon, Avicii, and Kanye West. The album also features guest vocals from boxer Mike Tyson and rappers Nicki Minaj, Nas, and Chance the Rapper.

Thematically, Rebel Heart represents the singer's romantic and rebellious sides; the ideas grew organically during the writing and recording sessions. Musically, it is a pop record that merges genres such as 1990s house, trap, and reggae, while using acoustic guitars and a gospel choir. Some songs are autobiographical, while others discuss love and Madonna's career. Unlike her previous work, the large number of collaborators made it difficult for Madonna to maintain a cohesive sound and creative direction.

The record was scheduled for release in March 2015, and the first single was slated for release on Valentine's Day. However, after a series of unexpected album-content leaks, Madonna made Rebel Heart available for pre-order on the iTunes Store on December 20, 2014, with six songs available immediately for download. A police investigation led to the arrest and indictment of an Israeli man accused of hacking into Madonna's computer and leaking the songs. The album's artwork became popular on social media, prompting numerous memes.

To promote Rebel Heart, Madonna made several television appearances and embarked on the Rebel Heart Tour, which visited North America, Europe, Asia, and Oceania from September 2015 to March 2016. "Living for Love", "Ghosttown", "Bitch I'm Madonna", and "Hold Tight" were released as singles from the album. Rebel Heart received predominantly positive reviews from music critics; multiple reviewers called it Madonna's best effort in a decade. It reached number one in Australia, Belgium, Canada, Croatia, the Czech Republic, Germany, Hungary, Italy, the Netherlands, Portugal, South Korea, Spain, and Switzerland. Rebel Heart was certified gold or platinum in seven countries.

== Background and development ==
Following the release of her twelfth studio album, MDNA (2012), Madonna embarked on The MDNA Tour to promote it. The tour created widespread controversy over her statements on violence, human rights, politics, her use of fake firearms, and her on-stage nudity. She was threatened with several lawsuits. Madonna was angered by several world events, which she described as acts of "injustice" against humanity. In September 2013, she released Secretprojectrevolution, a short film about artistic freedom and human rights that she directed with Steven Klein. The film launched a global initiative known as Art for Freedom to promote freedom of expression. Madonna said in a L'Uomo Vogue interview that her next album would be connected to Art for Freedom, adding that she was committed to the initiative and had to use her voice as an artist.

By December 2013, Madonna's manager Guy Oseary commented that the singer was "eager to get started" on her next album. However, she had another project in mind: developing the screenplay for a film adaptation of Andrew Sean Greer's novel The Impossible Lives of Greta Wells. Madonna decided to split her time between writing the screenplay and writing songs for the new album. In February 2014, Madonna confirmed she had begun working on her thirteenth studio album. Her previous work had been produced with a small core group of people developing the music. Working with many collaborators on Rebel Heart, Madonna encountered problems keeping a cohesive sound and creative direction for it. She observed that many of the people she enlisted to work on the album could not stay in one city for any length of time due to their schedules. As a result, she did not finish songs in a single session. "It was challenging ... with people coming and going in a revolving door of creativity".

== Writing and recording sessions ==
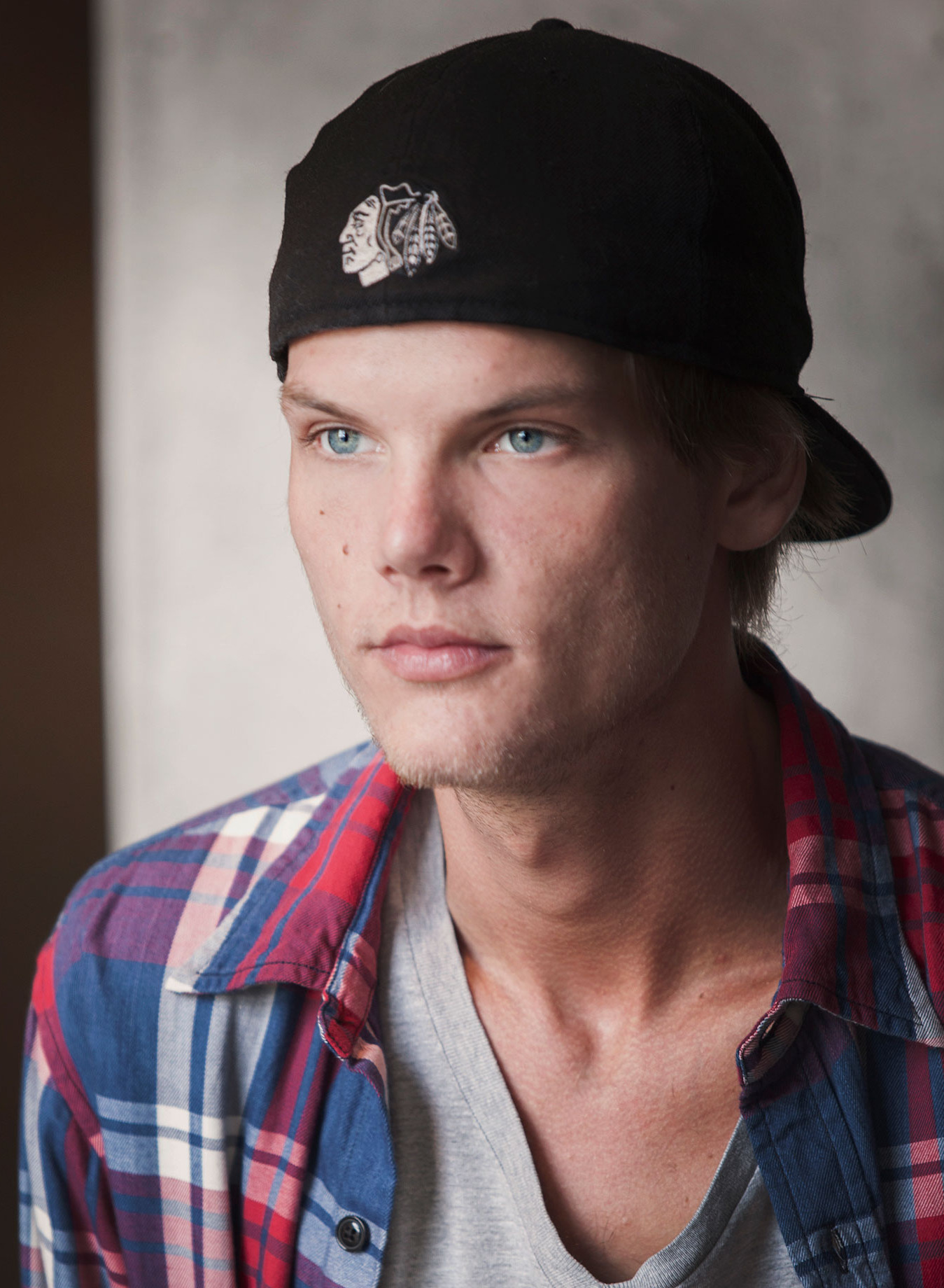
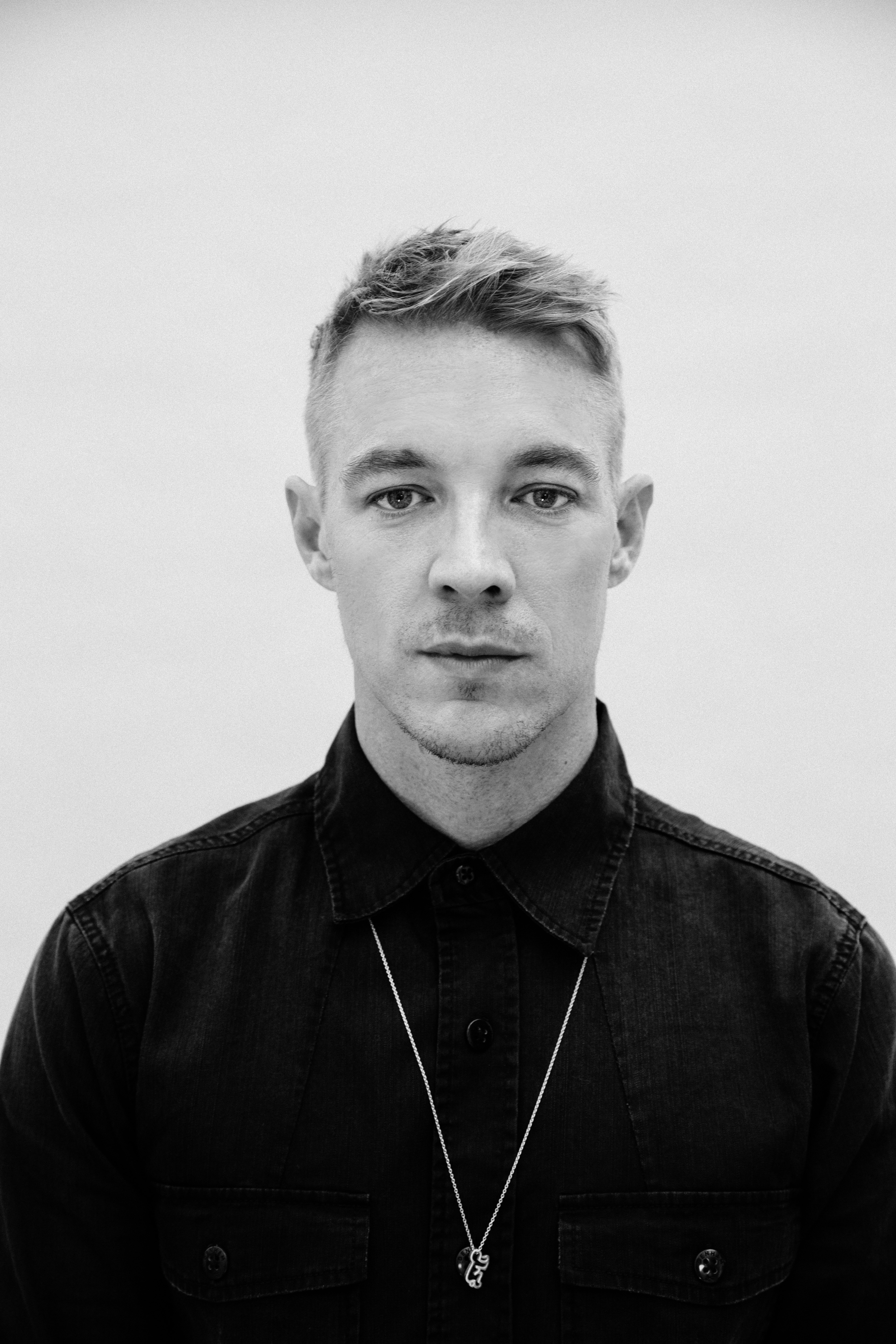
Two of Madonna's collaborators on the album were Avicii (left) and Diplo (right)

In March 2014, Madonna began posting a number of images on Instagram hinting at possible songwriters and collaborators with hashtag captions. First, she posted about going into the recording studio with Swedish DJ and producer Avicii. Record producer Carl Falk spoke with the Dagens Nyheter newspaper in April 2014 about these sessions. He recalled that eleven demos with acoustic guitars and piano were recorded within a week at Henson Recording Studios in Hollywood. Avicii's manager Arash "Ash" Pour Nouri selected six people. They were divided into two groups, the first consisted of Falk, Rami Yacoub, and Savan Kotecha; the second consisted of Salem Al Fakir, Vincent Pontare, and Magnus Lidehäll. Avicii worked with both groups to create the demo songs, while Madonna arrived at the studio in the afternoon and stayed until 7:00 am. She worked closely with both teams while writing and changing melodies, and oversaw the process.

A few days later, Madonna posted an image of a sunset with the words "Rebel Heart" on them, and a caption which the media interpreted as lyrics from a new song. The lines posted were: "Day turns into night. I won't give up the fight. Don't want to get to the end of my days... saying I wasn't amazed". Additional images showed Madonna with singer Natalia Kills in front of a microphone, and with Martin Kierszenbaum, the founder and chairman of Cherrytree Records, and senior executive of A&R for Interscope Records, Madonna's label. By mid-April 2014, she had also revealed on Instagram the names of songwriters Toby Gad and Mozella and record producer Symbolyc One with images of the group working in studio. The list of personnel grew to include producer Ariel Rechtshaid and sound engineer Nick Rowe.

"When I first got a chance to work with Madonna I didn't expect much to come from it. Maybe because she is one of the biggest pop stars of all time. I didn't think she would take me serious just another producer working on a huge album. She showed me a whole other level of dedication and old school work ethic when it comes to writing".

— Diplo on working with Madonna.

In May 2014, Madonna posted a selfie in which she talked about working with American DJ Diplo. She had invited him for her annual Oscar party, but he could not attend. They eventually began discussing music by text message and decided to collaborate on the album. Madonna asked him to provide his "craziest record" for the album. Together they wrote and recorded seven songs. "Those records are gonna be crazy-sounding. We really pushed the envelope with some of the stuff we were doing... [S]he was up for anything. I love when an artist gives a producer the confidence, he needs to work with them, and Madonna was very open-minded to my ideas", Diplo added.

One song was composed using a hook Madonna had sung in the studio; Diplo described it as "super weird". Another one, later confirmed as "Living for Love", had nearly twenty versions recorded ranging from a piano ballad to an EDM version. Ultimately Madonna and Diplo compromised on a version midway between the two styles. Rechtshaid and British singer MNEK also joined their writing sessions, improving the song's verses. Diplo also confirmed another track, known as "Bitch I'm Madonna", which he said would push the lyrical boundaries for a pop song. Alicia Keys also contributed to the album by playing piano on "Living for Love". Madonna confirmed two other songs, "Messiah" and "Devil Pray", in different interviews. In 2022, Madonna named Rebel Heart the "most stressful" album she's ever done due to its multiple collaborators.

== Titling and themes ==
Thematically, Caryn Ganz of Rolling Stone felt the album focused on two subjects: listening to one's heart, and being a rebel. Madonna explained that these concepts were not her initial inspiration but emerged during the sessions with Avicii. Madonna observed two distinct themes emerging organically, and felt the need to express them. The record was titled Rebel Heart, since it dealt with two different aspects of the singer's character—her rebellious, renegade side, and her romantic side; she wanted the album to represent both. On the French radio station NRJ, she explained that Rebel Heart could be both autobiographical and fictional, since she mixed both her own experiences with imaginary narratives while writing the songs. The title stemmed from Madonna's belief that contemporary music artists are not encouraged or inspired to be rebellious, take risks, or speak up, and she wanted to highlight this. However, she understood the importance of love within a rebellious nature, so she added the word Heart to the title. On March 12, 2015, Madonna said in an interview with Larry Flick on SiriusXM that she had suggested releasing the album as a double album, saying the combined track list gave it a schizophrenic sound.

"There's a looking back here, a missing the beginning of my career when I was surrounded by other artists... like Keith Haring and Basquiat and Warhol. It was a time when pop music was more naive and free. I was missing that feeling and that mixture of so many different worlds in New York".

— Madonna talking to Jim Farber of the New York Daily News about the album.

Introspection was also identified as one of the album's central themes. "[G]enuine statements of personal and careerist reflection [are] scattered among the posturing of 'Bitch I'm Madonna' and 'Unapologetic Bitch'" according to Slant Magazine's Sam C. Mac as well as her "obsessive self-regard". Madonna explained to Jon Pareles of The New York Times that, although she has never looked back at her past endeavors, reminiscing about it felt right for Rebel Heart. "And it's bittersweet for me to think about that. It just seemed like a time where I wanted to stop and look back. It's kind of like survivor guilt. How did I make it and they didn't?" During the album's development phase, she became comfortable expressing her ideas in front of a few people, comparing it to "writing your diary in front of somebody and reading it out loud... It was almost like an acting exercise, you know, just putting myself in a room and letting ideas flow even if I didn't feel so connected to the people".

Further inspiration for the album came from Madonna's exploration of other cultures and art, literature, and music, referencing them in the songs. She believed that the tracks should stand on their own, so that one could sing them accompanied by just a guitar. Madonna enlisted the help of her daughter Lourdes and son Rocco, calling them her A&R advisers. They visited nightclubs and told her about up-and-coming music and artists, helping to shape the sounds she gravitated toward for the album.

Generally, a pop record, Rebel Heart was different from Madonna's releases in the last decade according to Bradley Stern of MuuMuse. He called it an "eclectic record" citing the merging of an array of musical genres like 1990s house, trap, and reggae along with the use of acoustic guitars. Stern felt that unlike Hard Candy (2008) and MDNA, which chased then-current musical trends, this album's sound was progressive. Adding to this, Mitchell Sunderland from Vice felt that Rebel Heart was a "lesson learned" from the criticism Madonna had received for her previous two albums. Jed Gottlieb of the Boston Herald found that the album continued Madonna's "increasingly interesting, innovative approach" by combining contemporary musical styles with her previous tastes. He found Rebel Heart to be an improvement over the generic dance tunes on MDNA. For Jon Pareles of The New York Times, Rebel Heart was like a sequel to MDNA in its composition. While MDNA was marred by its cold mechanized vocals and clichéd songwriting, Rebel Heart portrays Madonna's musical abilities and as a lyricist "who ponders sin along with romance and fame". Jay Lustig of The Record believed that Madonna's previous work had often lacked thematic coherence. However, with Rebel Heart, he felt she created potentially successful singles despite the tracks' different styles, maintaining consistency across the record.

== Music and lyrical interpretation ==
Duality of Madonna's personality represented in Rebel Heart
"Bitch I'm Madonna"
"Bitch I'm Madonna", one of the rebellious tracks, featuring uptempo beats and lyrics about having fun and doing whatever she wants at a party.

"Ghosttown"
"Ghosttown", one of the romantic tracks, featuring an uplifting composition with Madonna singing about two lovers surviving after armageddon.

Rebel Heart opens with the song "Living for Love". A house song, it begins with Madonna singing over a "regal" piano line, eventually joined by percussion. Although a breakup song, it is triumphant and hopeful. According to Dean Piper of The Daily Telegraph, the song has "some classic Madonna traits: religious references, a gospel choir, '90s piano beats and a whirling bass". It was compared to her 1989 singles, "Like a Prayer" and "Express Yourself" by Jason Lipshutz of Billboard. The second track, "Devil Pray", was inspired by how one could be enticed to partake of narcotics to achieve a higher level of consciousness and connect to God. Lyrically it asks for salvation from a variety of drug abuses, making allusions to Saint Mary and Lucifer, as well as the pain of healing from drug abuse. Produced by Madonna with Falk, Avicii, DJ Dahi, and Blood Diamonds, "Devil Pray" starts with gentle guitar sounds which build up to an electropop production, accompanied by a house beat. "Ghosttown" talks about civilizations ending and the world encountering an armageddon, but humans seeing hope amid the destruction. Written with Jason Evigan, Evan Bogart, and Sean Douglas, it is a power ballad song, which Madonna sings in "piercing" and "warm" vocals like those of Karen Carpenter; the production is comparable to her 1986 single, "Live to Tell". According to Douglas, "Ghosttown" was written in three days after Madonna personally requested studio time with him and the other songwriters. The fourth track, "Unapologetic Bitch", has reggae, dancehall, and dubstep influences. It is a ska song in which Madonna speaks negatively about a breakup and her lover, with lyrics such as: "It might sound like I'm an unapologetic bitch but sometimes you have to call it like it is". Madonna explained that the song is about having fun regardless of the situation.

"Illuminati", the fifth song, was inspired after Madonna learned that she was considered one of the Illuminati's members. She decided to research the real Illuminati and then wrote the song. Lyrically it refers to the Illuminati conspiracy theory, the Egyptian pyramids, the Phoenix, the Age of Enlightenment, and the Eye of Providence among others, with the chorus's lyrics: "It's like everybody in this party is shining like Illuminati". According to Madonna, Kanye West, who produced the track, loved the melody and changed the composition adding his own spin to it. Minaj appears on the sixth track, "Bitch I'm Madonna", where she raps, asking everybody to "go hard or go home", while Madonna shouts lyrics like: "I just want to have fun tonight, I wanna blow up this house tonight". Produced by Diplo and Sophie, the track has a tearing sound alongside the "bleepy electro" and "churning dubstep" composition. During the writing sessions, Minaj had to rewrite the lyrics until she got the sentiment Madonna wanted. "Hold Tight" consists of an "arresting" chorus and a drum beat sound, described by Sam C. Mac of Slant Magazine as: "innocuous, lyrically platitudinous pop that briefly works itself up into something exciting when it threatens to become a gospelized stomp". Track eight, "Joan of Arc", is a ballad where Madonna sings about the media scrutiny of her life, singing: "Each time they take a photograph, I lose a part of me I can't get back". It also references the Roman Catholic saint Joan of Arc. Madonna's hushed, vibrato-tinged vocals, and confessional lyrics on "Joan of Arc", are enhanced by a new beat instrumentation that utilizes strings and acoustic guitars in the bridge.

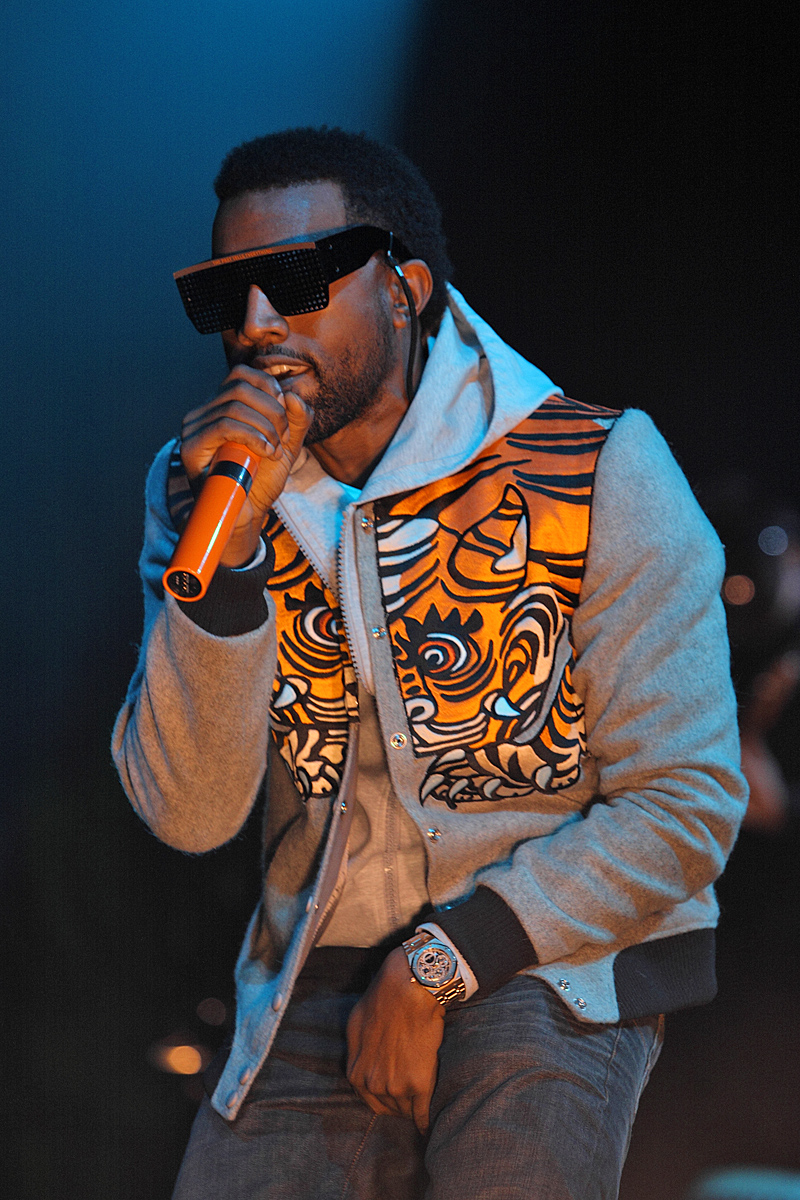
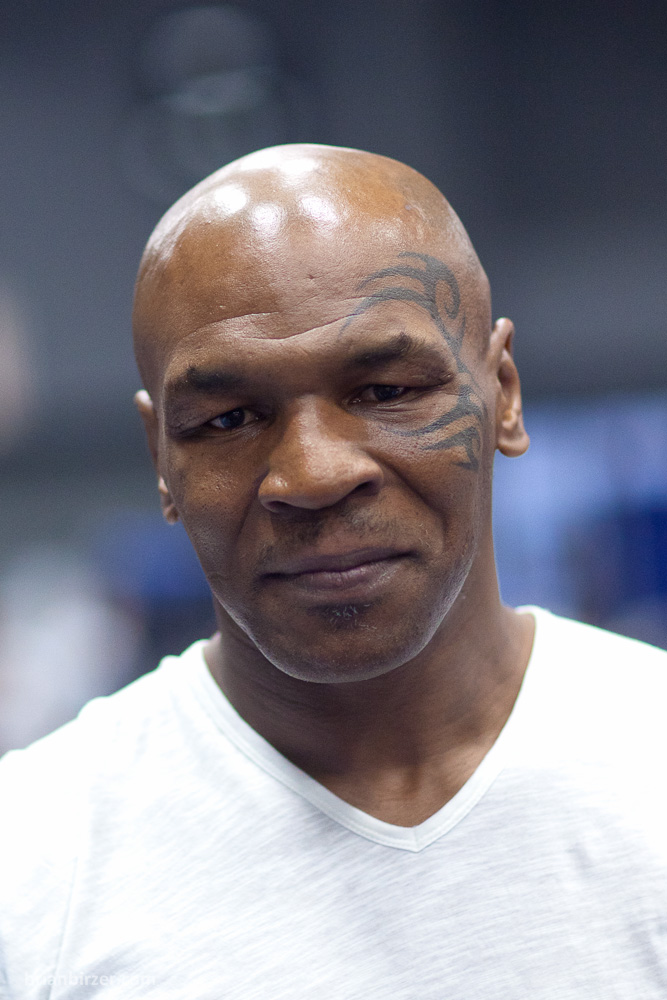
Kanye West (left) produced the tracks "Illuminati" and "Holy Water", while boxer Mike Tyson (right) provided a spoken word introduction to "Iconic".

"Iconic" features Chance the Rapper and boxer Mike Tyson. Tyson does a spoken word introduction to the song, similar to his addition to Canibus's debut single, "Second Round K.O." (1998). Madonna invited him to the recording studio where he talked about his life; he recorded the introduction in one take. Consisting of a "weird" beat, "Iconic"'s lyrics find Madonna embracing herself as an icon. "HeartBreakCity" follows "Iconic". A piano ballad talking about lost love, Madonna sings in a deeper vocal register, inspired by baroque pop. With its synths, banjo sounds, and hollow drums, "Body Shop" describes love as a damaged car on a highway, requiring a body repair to be alive. West also produced the next track, "Holy Water", where the singer compares her bodily fluids to the title. With hedonistic sound effects, the song is reminiscent of Madonna's 1990 single, "Justify My Love" and contains a lyrical excerpt from "Vogue". A bassline accompanies the chorus, consisting of moaning sounds, arcade game music, and synths. "Inside Out" was produced by Mike Dean, and features Madonna's vocals with reverb, accompanied by piano sounds and restrained chords. "Wash All Over Me" follows, and is the last track on the standard version of the album. Baroque piano sounds, and a steady military beat, lead up to the chorus as Madonna sings about the world changing, heartbreaks, and acceptance. A gospel choir and minimum synths back the song's sound.

The deluxe version of Rebel Heart continues with the track "Best Night", an '80s electro composition reminiscent of Sade's songs with drums and Indian flute instrumentation. Madonna begins the song with the line, "You can call me M tonight" but her voice is not discernible in the chorus, only in the harmonies. There is another reference to "Justify My Love" at one point during the intermediate bridge. "Veni Vidi Vici" appears next, and is a rap "origin story song" with its lyrics built around Madonna's songs: "I expressed myself, came like a virgin down the aisle / Exposed my naked ass, and I did it with a smile / And when it came to sex, I knew I walked the borderline / and when I struck a pose, all the gay boys lost their minds". Madonna sings the chorus over simple guitar beats, uttering "I came, I saw, I conquered", the English translation of the song's title. Nas appears for a guest verse talking about his own life as Diplo backs it with shotgun and crunching horn sounds. "S.E.X." is the next track where Madonna asks sarcastically "tell me what you know about sex" over sounds of bass, synths and a string arpeggio. Near the end she lists a number of bondage items like: "Twisted rope, handcuffs, blindfold, string of pearls". Described as both an embodiment and critique of the act, "S.E.X." talks about the lack of intimacy with Madonna rapping in a "dispassionate" voice; she purposely made it sound like she had a lisp as she articulated the words.

"Messiah" is a dramatic pop ballad with an orchestra backing and violins. Madonna sings in a "deeper velvety" tone. The lyrics talk about lighting candles, necromancy, and casting love spells. The title track finishes the deluxe version and was changed completely from its leaked demo. It consists of acoustic guitar and violins, with autobiographical lyrics. Amy Pettifer of The Quietus noted, "'Rebel Heart' quietly [acknowledges Madonna's] part in building the scene and popularizing stylistics that are the foundation of current trends". The super deluxe version presents tracks like "Graffiti Heart", where Madonna drew inspiration from artists, such as her former boyfriend Jean-Michel Basquiat and friend Keith Haring, evoking the power of art in gaining freedom. It was described by the Pretty Much Amazing blog as "a galloping love letter to creativity", while "Beautiful Scars" is a disco-lite throwback track. "Borrowed Time" deals with war and social issues while "Auto-Tune Baby" features a baby wailing in the background.

== Release, leaks, and artwork ==
In May 2014, photographer Mert Alas posted on his Instagram account that he was listening to a new Madonna album. Billboard clarified that she was still recording it in Los Angeles. They later posted a 50-second snippet of an instrumental which media outlets claimed was from Madonna, but the sample was traced back to Dutch DJ Sander Kleinenberg and his song "We Are Superstars". Oseary confirmed that Madonna was aiming for a 2015 release date for the album. However, on November 28, 2014, two songs titled "Rebel Heart" and "Wash All Over Me" leaked online; the songs were quickly taken down, and Oseary tweeted asking for help finding the source of the leaks. On December 17, 2014, thirteen songs were leaked, as well as artwork suggesting the album was to be named Iconic. Madonna clarified that the songs were demo versions from earlier recordings; she described the leak as "artistic rape". The singer was criticized for referring to the hack as "terrorism" because of the then-recent Peshawar school massacre and the Sydney hostage crisis. Madonna said in a Billboard interview that after the leak she and her team tried to trace it to the source, but ultimately decided to release the finished songs. Referring to the Sony Pictures hack, she was critical of the internet and explained that the incident led to her securing her laptop and hard drives, and disabling the Wi-Fi. "I wanted to plan everything in advance. Release the single, shoot a video, start talking about my record. And you know, prepare for the release of the entire album and have everything set up just so... But we sort of were left with no choice", she added.

Obviously there is a person, or a group of people behind this that were essentially terrorising me. I don't want to sound alarming, but certainly that's how I felt. It's one thing if someone comes into your house and steals a painting off your wall: that's also a violation, but, your work, as an artist, that's devastating [...] It was not a consensual agreement. I did not say 'hey, here's my music, and it's finished.' It was theft.

— Madonna talking about the leaks to Alexis Petridis of The Guardian.

On December 20, 2014, the album was made available for pre-order at the iTunes Store. Once ordered, six tracks, "Living for Love", "Devil Pray", "Ghosttown", "Unapologetic Bitch", "Illuminati" and "Bitch I'm Madonna", were automatically downloaded. Madonna said the songs were meant to be "an early Christmas gift" for her fans, with the final release of the album scheduled for March 10, 2015. Originally, "Living for Love" was intended to serve as the album's lead single. It was to be released on Valentine's Day, with the rest of the record slated for the spring. However, due to the leak, the release date had to be pushed up. Oseary recalled that they did not receive a confirmation until Friday night whether the pre-release could be executed, since iTunes was closing for the Christmas weekend. After much discussion on the pros and cons of the release, and with the aid of Interscope Vice-chairman Steve Berman, and Apple Inc.'s Robert Kondrk, they were able to go live slowly. The six songs Madonna chose had to be polished, and since the tracks' producers were unavailable, she mastered and mixed them herself.

The album's release was compared to the surprise release of Beyoncé's 2013 self-titled album, with The Guardian calling it a "partial Beyoncé". The leaks continued with fourteen new demos being revealed between December 23 and 27. Three new tracks, "Hold Tight", "Joan of Arc" and "Iconic", became available following Madonna's Grammy performance in February 2015. The final track list for Rebel Heart was revealed on January 20, 2015, including the standard and deluxe version song names. A day later Israeli police arrested a man suspected of hacking into Madonna's, as well as other musicians' computers, stealing and leaking content. Lahav 433, an Israeli crime-fighting umbrella organization, had led a month-long investigation after the leaks occurred, working closely with the FBI. Although Israeli police refused to name the suspect, media identified him as former reality show contestant Adi Lederman, who had participated in the Israeli singing competition, Kokhav Nolad, season ten. As the deluxe edition leaked in full, Lederman was charged by Israel's Magistrate Court on four counts: computer trespassing (two charges), prohibited secret monitoring, copyright infringement, and obstructing investigation. The investigation also revealed that Lederman had leaked the demo of Madonna's lead single from MDNA, "Give Me All Your Luvin'". Copies of songs, including rehearsal recordings of upcoming Madonna performances, were sold for more than $1,000 to various clients. Lederman was ultimately sentenced to fourteen months in a Tel Aviv prison.

The cover art, featuring Madonna's face inter-crossed with black wires, became popular on social media resulting in numerous memes being created on Instagram, Tumblr and Twitter. Fans wound black wires across their faces imitating the cover, and created memes using the images of celebrities, including Britney Spears, Michael Jackson, Jim Carrey, and Marlon Brando. Madonna forwarded many of the images to her social media accounts. However, three of the images—those of Martin Luther King Jr., Nelson Mandela and Bob Marley with the same wires around their faces—were heavily criticized for being "disrespectful and racist". The singer explained the photos the next day, saying that she was flattered by the comparison to the three and characterized herself as a "freedom fighter". Rebel Heart became the singer's fourth studio album to bear the Parental Advisory label after Erotica (1992), American Life (2003) and MDNA, due to the profanity and sexual references in tracks such as "Holy Water". In January 2026, Madonna added "Auto-Tune Baby" to the digital deluxe version of the album.

== Promotion ==
=== Live appearances ===
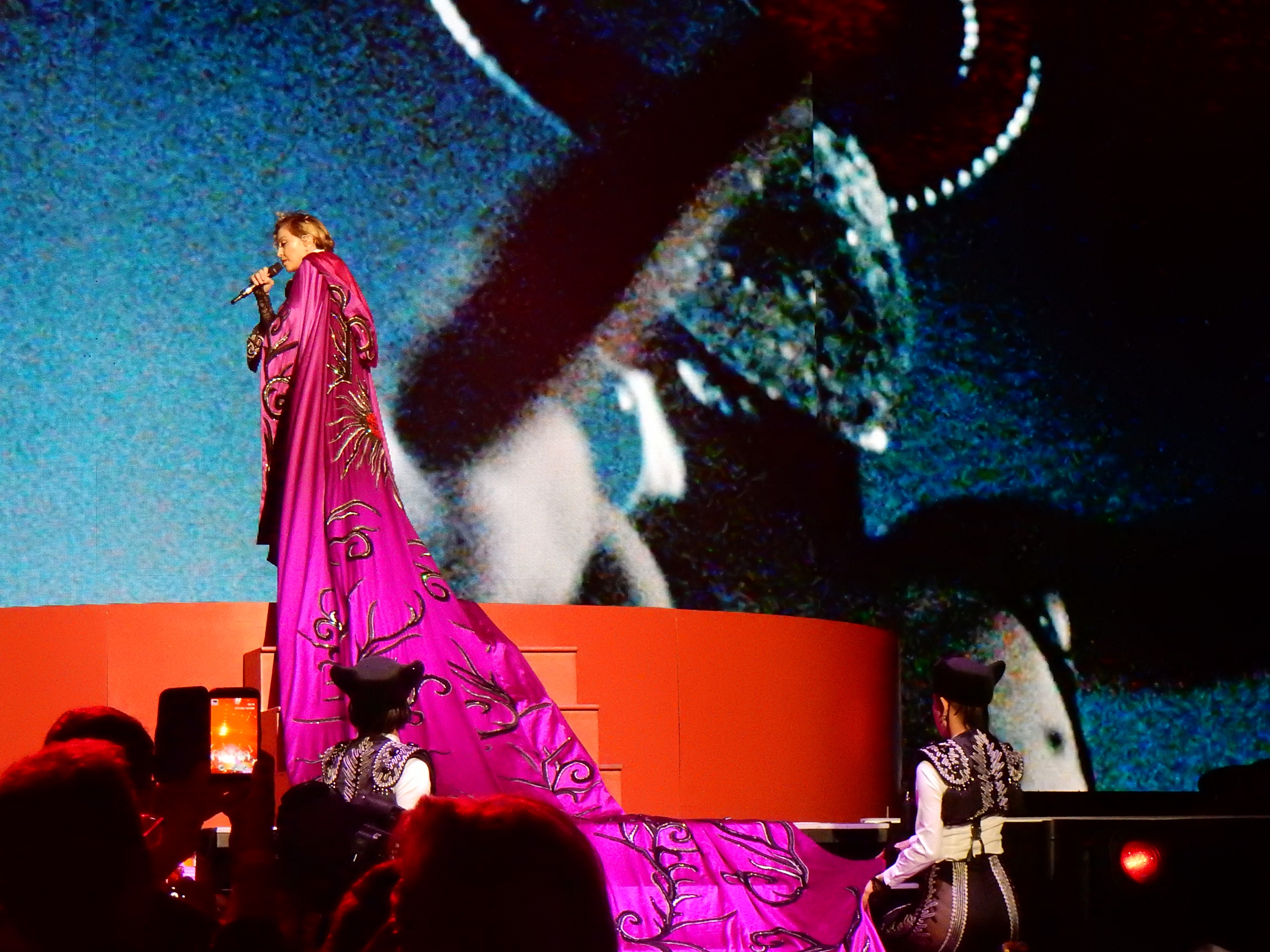
For the performance of "Living for Love" on the Rebel Heart Tour, Madonna wore a long cape similar to the one worn during the Brit Awards.

Madonna confirmed her appearance at the 57th Annual Grammy Awards on February 8, 2015; Oseary clarified she would also sing during the ceremony. The singer performed "Living for Love" wearing a one-piece, matador red outfit, surrounded by male dancers dressed as minotaurs similar to the song's music video. Forbes reported that Madonna's performance was the most-watched moment of the night. Her choice to sing live without Auto-Tune during the choreographed performance was widely praised. She also performed the song at the 2015 Brit Awards, on February 25, 2015. However, in the early stages of the performance, a wardrobe malfunction caused her to be pulled down a flight of stairs that made up part of the stage. She later took to Instagram to confirm she was well, posting: "Thanks for the good wishes! I'm fine". It was later revealed that her cape was tied too tightly. When her dancers attempted to remove it from her neck, this caused her to crash to the floor, leaving the audience in shock. After several seconds, she continued her performance as planned.

Madonna partnered with the geosocial networking app, Grindr to promote Rebel Heart. A contest was held, and five of the app's users were selected for an exclusive interview with the artist. The contest required re-creating the artwork for Rebel Heart and posting it as a Grindr profile picture. Other winners received signed copies of the album. Joe Stone from The Guardian considered this a "savvy" promotional method allowing Madonna to connect directly with her gay audience. Madonna appeared on The Jonathan Ross Show, for her first UK television interview in three years, on February 26, 2015 (aired on March 14). She performed an edited version of "Living for Love", as well as "Ghosttown" for the first time. On March 1, she traveled to Italy for an appearance on the television show Che tempo che fa (aired on March 8). She performed "Devil Pray" and "Ghosttown" while talking with host Fabio Fazio about a number of topics including the album's development process. The next day she appeared on France's Le Grand Journal show, performing an edited version of "Living for Love" and "Ghosttown". Another interview aired on The Today Show on March 9 and 10, 2015, where she spoke to host Carson Daly about the Rebel Heart leaks. Madonna appeared for the first time on a special edition of The Howard Stern Show on March 11, 2015. She discussed her life and personal relationships, as well as confirming that "Ghosttown" was to be Rebel Heart's second single.

Madonna appeared and performed on The Ellen DeGeneres Show in the US for the entire week of March 16 to 20. Songs performed included "Living for Love" with DeGeneres herself joining the singer onstage. She also sang a stripped-down version of "Joan of Arc", "Ghosttown", and finally, her 1985 single "Dress You Up", during a bathroom concert sequence with DeGeneres. On March 29, 2015, Madonna performed "Ghosttown" at the 2nd iHeartRadio Music Awards in Los Angeles, where singer Taylor Swift joined her on stage playing guitar. Two days later, the BBC's Jo Whiley interviewed her for Radio 2, the singer's first radio interview in the UK. Madonna appeared on The Tonight Show Starring Jimmy Fallon on April 9, 2015, singing "Bitch I'm Madonna" and her 1983 single, "Holiday".

=== Singles ===
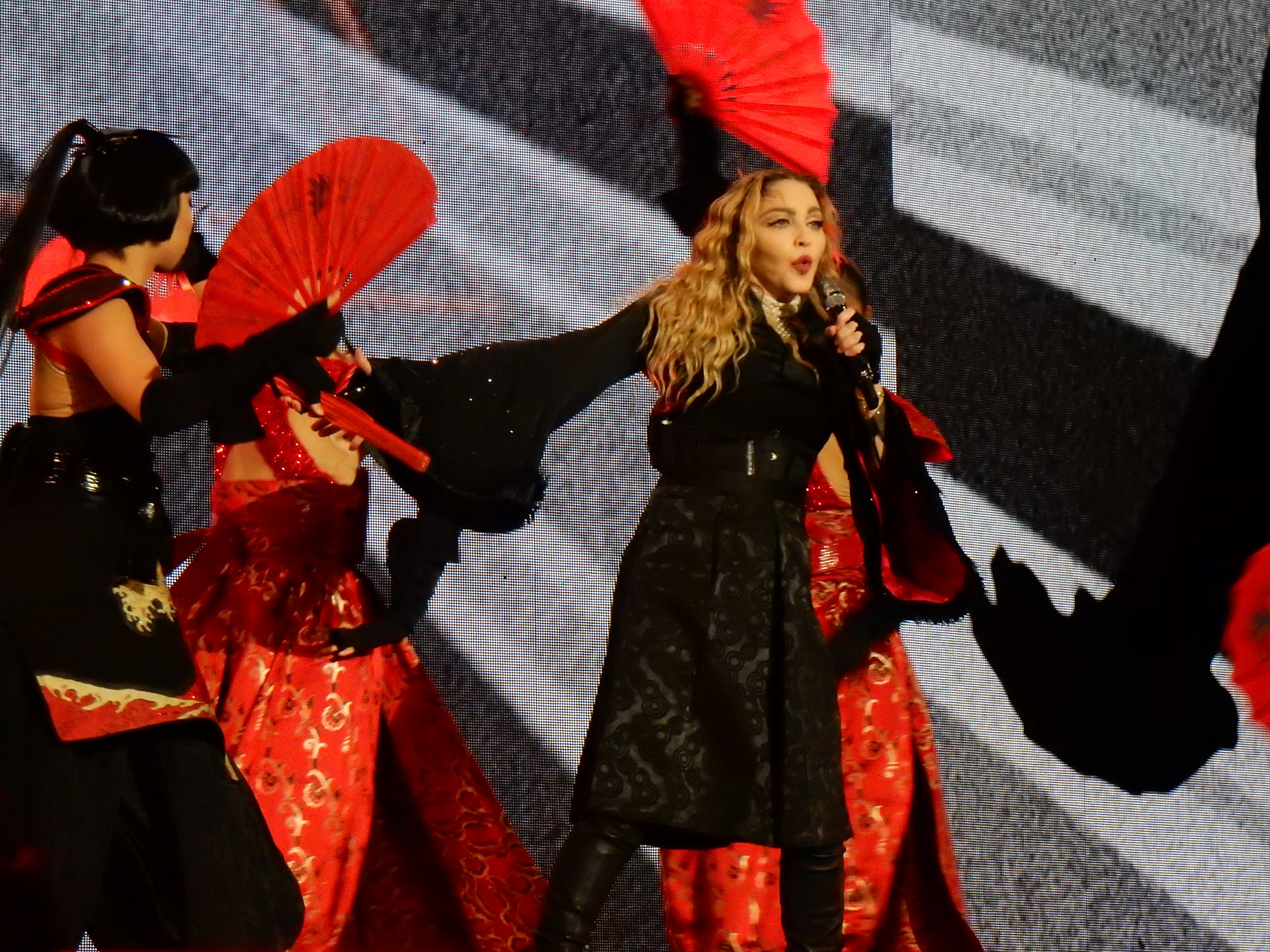
Madonna performing Rebel Heart's third single, "Bitch I'm Madonna", on the Rebel Heart Tour. The song became her 46th number-one on the Billboard Dance Club Songs chart.

"Living for Love" was the first single from the album, released along with five other tracks. It was sent for radio play in the US on February 10, 2015. The song received positive feedback with Slant Magazine listing it at number 25 on their year-end top songs list for 2015, saying: "Overworked and overthought, for sure, but the song's essence remains intact, and if Madonna's message of life after love didn't register as a commercial comeback on the scale of, say, Cher's 'Believe', it remains a pop-gospel sequel of the highest order". An accompanying music video, directed by the French duo Julien Choquart and Camille Hirigoyen, together known as J.A.C.K., was released in February 2015. Its storyline incorporates mythological elements and shows Madonna as a matador, fighting her dancers dressed like minotaurs on a red circular stage.

"Ghosttown" was first sent for radio airplay in Italy on March 13, 2015, and a week later in Australia. Jonas Åkerlund directed the music video, which starred actor Terrence Howard. The video's main theme was "an apocalyptic situation mimicking the end of the world", showing the singer and Howard as the sole survivors in a destroyed city.

The third single, "Bitch I'm Madonna", was released as a remix EP, featuring remixes by various collaborators. Åkerlund again helmed the video for the song, which featured Minaj and Diplo with Madonna, and cameo appearances by: Rita Ora, Chris Rock, Jon Kortajarena, Miley Cyrus, Alexander Wang, Beyoncé, Katy Perry, Kanye West, and Madonna's two sons, Rocco and David. Shot at the Standard Hotel in New York City, the video shows Madonna and her entourage partying throughout the building, ending on the rooftop. Technical difficulties plagued the release of the video to the streaming service Tidal; it was met with a mixed response. Critics complimented the craziness of the clip but panned the absence of the guest stars from the set.

"Bitch I'm Madonna" became the only track from the album to enter the Billboard Hot 100. It debuted and peaked at number 84 on the chart, aided by a total of 2.6 million streams of the song's audio and video. The first three singles reached the top of the Billboard Dance Club Songs. This extended Madonna's record as the artist with the most number-one songs on the chart. As well, she became the artist with the most number-one singles ever on a Billboard chart, breaking a tie with country singer George Strait who earned 44 number-ones on the Hot Country Singles chart. On June 5, 2024, the song surpassed 100 million streams on Spotify, making Madonna the first female and female lead artist to have one song from five different and consecutive decades to achieve this. "Living for Love" reached number 26 in the United Kingdom, becoming Madonna's 71st top-forty single, extending her record as the female artist with the most top-forty UK singles. "Hold Tight" was a radio only single in Italy, released for airplay on July 24, 2015, and served as the album's fourth single in that country.

=== Tour ===
Many news outlets began reporting on the concert tour supporting Rebel Heart. The Italian newspaper Torino Today reported Madonna was planning on returning to Turin with the tour on November 20 and 21, 2015. The Rebel Heart Tour kicked off on September 9, 2015, and visited North America, Europe, Asia and Oceania. Billboard reported it would only use arenas, and visit cities where Madonna had not performed previously. The initial itinerary included 25–30 shows in North America and 20–25 shows in Europe, with additional dates being revealed later. It was the singer's first visit to Australia since the Girlie Show, her 1993 tour, as well as her first time performing in New Zealand and the Philippines.

The tour's main stage was elevated and set up at the end of each arena. A long catwalk extended from the middle into the audience ending in a heart-shaped stage. The catwalk was bisected by an arena-wide cross stage. Designers working on the tour's wardrobe included: Jeremy Scott for Moschino, Alessandro Michele for Gucci and Alexander Wang, along with Fausto Puglisi, Prada, Miu Miu, Swarovski, Lebanese designer Nicolas Jebran, as well as Madonna's longtime collaborator Arianne Phillips. The tour generated positive critical reviews, many noting that Madonna appeared to be in a happy mood onstage. It grossed $169.8 million from 82 shows, with over 1.045 million ticket sales. A live album of the tour was released on September 15, 2017, on DVD, Blu-ray, and digital download.

== Critical reception ==
Professional ratings
Aggregate scores
Source	Rating
AnyDecentMusic?	6.3/10
Metacritic	68/100
Review scores
Source	Rating
AllMusic	3/5 stars
The A.V. Club	B−
Billboard	3.5/5 stars
The Guardian	3/5 stars
Los Angeles Times	3/4 stars
NME	5/10
Rolling Stone	3.5/5 stars
Slant Magazine	3.5/5 stars
Spin	6/10
USA Today	3.5/4 stars

On its release, Rebel Heart received predominantly positive critical reviews. At Metacritic, which assigns a weighted mean rating out of 100 to reviews by music critics, the album received an average score of 68, based on 29 reviews, which indicates "generally favorable reviews". The Daily Telegraph writer Neil McCormick, Andy Gill of The Independent and Lauren Murphy of The Irish Times each gave the album 4 out of 5 stars. McCormick felt that " [f]or the first time in years, [Madonna] doesn't sound desperate", praising it in comparison to Hard Candy and MDNA. Murphy wrote "the indisputable pop icon is back with a tentative bang" after MDNA had "few memorable pop hits". For Gill, the most impressive aspect of Rebel Heart was Madonna's vocals, while Erlewine found the album a revival of Madonna's defiant side and her confessional mood. Saeed Saeed of The National called it a "fine collection of sturdy pop tunes in which Madonna finally allows herself to look back and sometimes pilfer from her peak periods of the late 80s and early 2000s".

Writing for The Quietus, Amy Pettifer praised the album, describing it as: "a darker return to the club culture roots [for Madonna], and it seems—on some level—to face up to the missteps of her more recent releases. Giving it 3.5 out of 4 stars, USA Today writer Elysa Gardner described the album's sound and lyrics as "piercingly direct". Chicago Tribune writer Greg Kot and Randall Roberts of the Los Angeles Times awarded it 3 out of 4 stars. Kot believed the album would have been better without the songs referencing sexuality, but still considered it "fascinating". Roberts believed Rebel Heart stood out "sturdily" because of its production. Writing for The Boston Globe, James Reed opined that the album was a, "welcome detour in the artist's recent discography... her most satisfying effort in a decade and nimbly connects the dots between Madonna's various eras and guises". Critic Joey Guerra of the Houston Chronicle called Rebel Heart: "a complex, consistently strong album".

Slant Magazine editor Sal Cinquemani, Joe Levy of Billboard, and Caryn Ganz of Rolling Stone each awarded the album 3.5 out of 5 stars. Cinquemani wrote that the album was "all over the map", yet felt it was "a surprisingly coherent one". Levy wrote that the album was "subtle" compared to "current standards", adding that: "These songs unfold slowly, building through foreplay-like intros before hooks are displayed over a shifting series of textures". Ganz felt that Rebel Heart "is at its strongest when Madonna shoves everyone to the side and just tells it to us straight", adding: "Deep down, Madonna does have a rebel heart – and you can't fault her for reminding us that pop music is all the better for it". Jamieson Cox of Time commended the album for its consistent production and sound, and for Madonna's vocals and songwriting. Giving it a rating of "B", Kyle Anderson and Adam Markovitz of Entertainment Weekly called the album "Madonna's best outing since 2000's Music". Alexis Petridis of The Guardian and Time Out writer Nick Levine gave the album 3 out of 5 stars. Petridis felt that the two contrasting sides of the album did not "quite gel", reasoning that: "the former might represent the music Madonna wants to make, while the latter is the music she feels obliged to make". Levine wrote: "'Rebel Heart' may lack cohesion, but she's definitely not down for the count: this contains some of the best music Madonna's made in a decade".

Annie Zalesky of The A.V. Club said the record had its "fair share of those head scratching moments", but found it to be a move in the right direction musically. Spin writer Andrew Unterberger gave Rebel Heart a 6 out of 10 rating. While calling it "clunky", he felt it contained some of Madonna's "best songs in years". Instinct's Samuel Murrian opined that the album "might have been something like a home run if it were a few tracks shorter". For WhatCulture's Reece Shrewsbury, "there's a lot of experimentation and lots of variation, which sound impressive, but in practice, keep the album disjointed". Despite naming it "closer to the Madonna that earned her Queen of Pop title", Shrewsbury concluded that Rebel Heart "still has a lot of flaws [...] [it] struggles to keep cohesion and a creative direction". Writing for The New Zealand Herald, Lydia Jenkin gave it a mixed review, deeming the album a "bit of a mess" and "confused". Lindsay Zoladz of New York magazine was disappointed, feeling the songs sounded "safe", adding that: "Madonna of Rebel Heart [has] succeeded once again in the increasingly empty goal of sounding current". The staff of The Advocate also expressed disappointment; "too many songs name-check celebrities and drugs and contain insipid lyrics that the Madonna of 15 years ago would have laughed at. Where is our thoughtful icon?". Gavin Haynes of NME panned the album, saying that it "feels like a wasted opportunity. Trite self-empowerment anthem 'Iconic' informs us that there's only two letters difference between Icon and I Can't. Sadly, there are also two letters between class and ass".

== Commercial performance ==
In the United States, Rebel Heart debuted at number two on the Billboard 200 chart with 121,000 album equivalent units, behind the soundtrack of the TV series Empire, which sold 9,000 units more. While it was the best-selling album of the week—ranking number one on Billboard's Top Album Sales chart with pure album sales of 116,000 copies (96% of overall units)—it fell behind the soundtrack when it came to streaming and track equivalent album units, with just over 1,000 and 4,000 units respectively. It became Madonna's 21st top-ten album, but was her first studio release not to debut atop the chart since Ray of Light (1998). Rebel Heart's concert tour bundle amounted to less than 10,000 copies compared to the 180,000 copies sold for her previous album, MDNA. The release also saw Madonna debut at number seven on the Billboard Artist 100 chart, moving up by 2,919% in overall Artist 100 points and gaining 31% in social media activity. In Canada, Rebel Heart debuted at number one on the Canadian Albums Chart. With 18,000 copies sold in the first week, it became Madonna's seventh number-one there during the SoundScan era. The next week, the album dropped 19 places on the Billboard 200, while in Canada it dropped only one position. Billboard reported sales dropped by 78% to 26,000 units, a reflection of the high pre-orders during the first week. The album was present for a total of 11 weeks on the chart, and ranked at number 151 on the Billboard 200 year-end chart for 2015. As of December 2016, the album has sold 238,000 copies in the US according to Nielsen SoundScan.

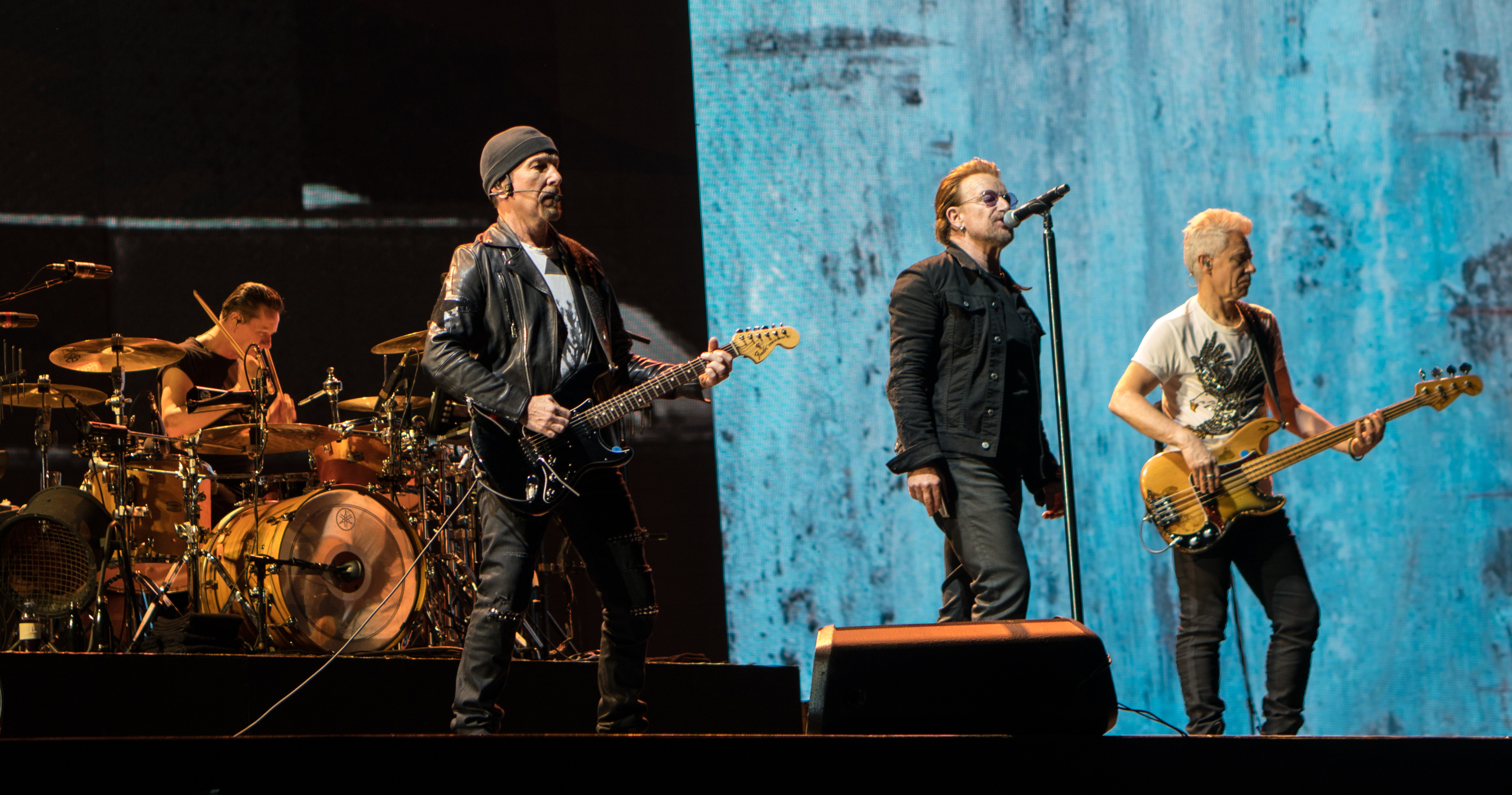
In Australia, Madonna tied with U2 as the artist with the most number-one albums since the establishment of ARIA in 1983.

Despite outselling its nearest competitors by a ratio of nearly 3:1 within 24 hours on sale in the United Kingdom, Rebel Heart entered the UK Albums Chart at number two with 37,245 units. The chart-topper of that week, Sam Smith's In the Lonely Hour, pushed ahead at the last minute and sold 12,000 copies more than Rebel Heart. It became Madonna's first studio album to miss the top spot since Bedtime Stories, which also debuted at number two in 1994. The following week, the album dropped to number seven, with sales declining by 67.46% to 11,983 copies. The album had sold 76,490 copies as of June 2015, and was later certified gold by the British Phonographic Industry (BPI) for 100,000 units. Rebel Heart debuted at the top of the German Albums Chart, becoming her twelfth chart-topping record there. Madonna surpassed the Beatles and Robbie Williams as the foreign act with the most number-one albums in German chart history. She equaled Herbert Grönemeyer for third place overall, behind only Peter Maffay and James Last with 16 and 13 chart-toppers respectively. In France, the album debuted at number three on the SNEP Albums chart, with three-day sales of 17,000 copies. Rebel Heart also debuted at number one on record charts in: Austria, Belgium (Flanders), Croatia, the Czech Republic, Hungary, Italy, the Netherlands, Portugal, Spain and Switzerland, as well as in the top ten in the rest of Europe.

In Australia, Rebel Heart debuted at the top of the ARIA Albums Chart with sales of 6,962 copies. It was Madonna's eleventh number-one album in the country tying her with U2 as the act with the most number-one albums since ARIA's establishment in 1983. Rebel Heart became Madonna's 19th week atop the chart, ranking her at number 24 on the list of artists with most accumulated weeks at the top. The album had a sharp drop the next week, selling 1,312 copies and falling to number 18 on the album chart. In New Zealand, it debuted at number seven on the Official New Zealand Music Chart. In Japan, Rebel Heart debuted at number eight on the Oricon Albums Chart with first-week sales of 7,548 physical units, becoming her record-extending 23rd top-ten album there. It also entered the Oricon International Albums Chart at number one, staying there for a second week. In South Korea, the album gave Madonna two top-ten entries simultaneously on the Gaon International Albums Chart, with the deluxe edition at number one and the standard edition at number seven. Rebel Heart ended 2015 as the 39th best-selling album of the year with sales of 900,000 copies. As of 2018, Rebel Heart has sold one million copies worldwide.

== Accolades ==
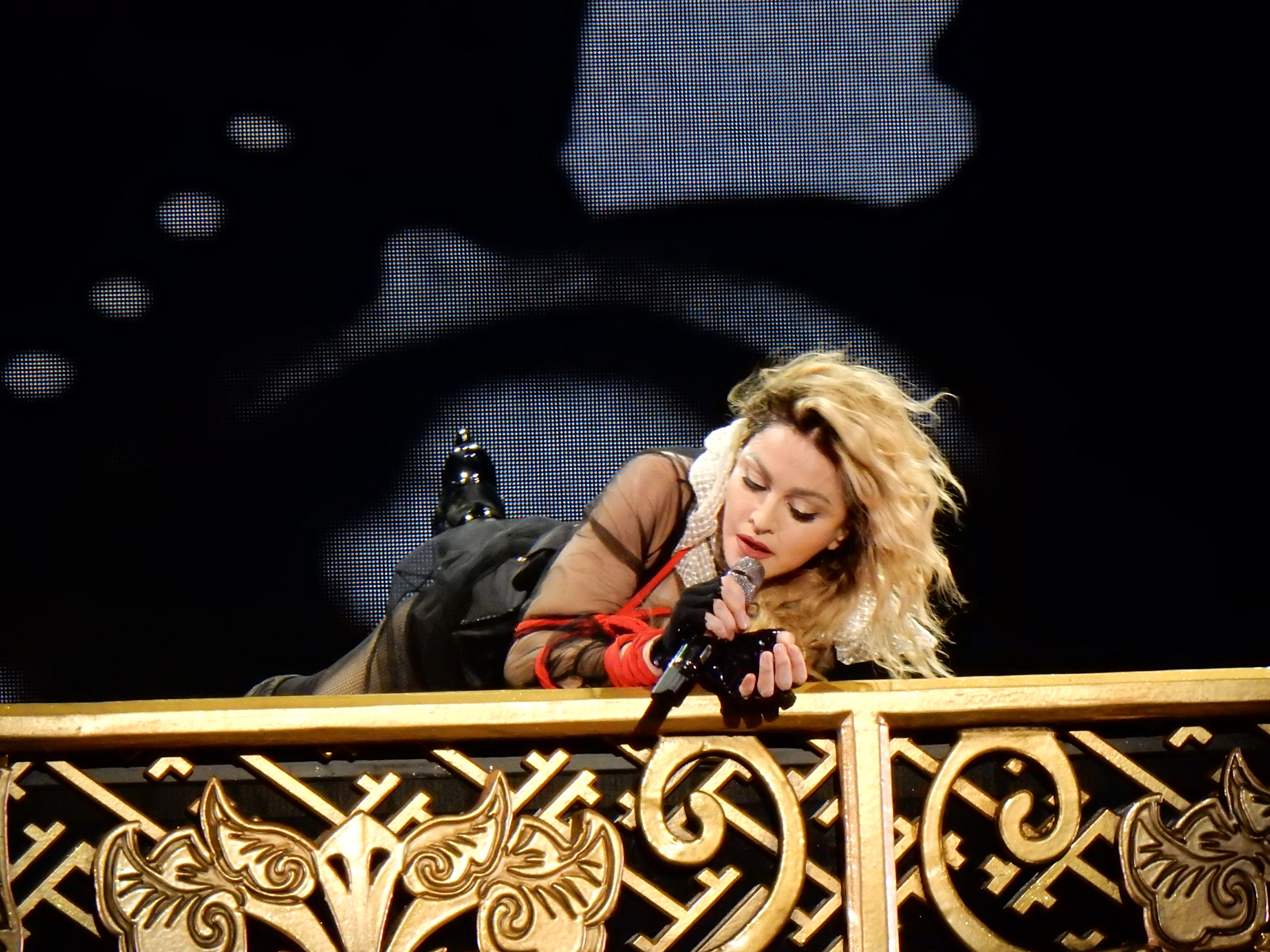
Madonna performing album track "Devil Pray" during the Rebel Heart Tour.

In its year-end review of albums released in 2015, Rolling Stone ranked Rebel Heart at number 45 noting: "Rebel Heart was [Madonna's] finest album in a decade, picking up the disco-stick baton of her 2005 Confessions on a Dance Floor as Madonna voyages back into the groove and reflects on where she's been lately". It was also listed at number six on its ranking of the 20 Best Pop Albums of 2015. Similarly, in its year-end review, Spin magazine listed the album at number 21 as Andrew Unterberger noted that: "For most artists who spent whole decades defining the mainstream, titling an album Rebel Heart would seem misguided at best, but for Madonna, it's truer now than ever: A fifty-something refusing to bend to public demands about how she should age gracefully... is as big an act of defiance as you can stage in contemporary pop music". AllMusic called Rebel Heart one of their favorite pop albums of 2015, describing it as: "Bold, messy, and life-affirming record that finds Madonna simultaneously looking forward and back".

For its year-end tabulation, Digital Spy listed Rebel Heart at number 10 on the list of top 25 albums of 2015. Lewis Corner noted the tracks ranged from: "brilliant, dancehall groove to more reflective and somber pop ballads". He added that: "At this stage in her career, if Madonna doesn't have 'pop chameleon' on her LinkedIn profile... then Rebel Heart alone is enough to endorse that title". He listed "Devil Pray" as a standout track. About.com ranked the record as the fifth best pop album of 2015, with reviewer Bill Lamb calling it a "return to form", and her strongest endeavor since Music (2000). Associated Press music editor Mesfin Fekadu ranked the album at number five, describing the album as a "contemporary classic that puts albums from other female artists half [Madonna]'s age to shame". Fekadu felt it "unfortunate" radio stations did not play songs from the album, listing "Bitch I'm Madonna" and "Joan of Arc" as highlights. Billboard listed the deluxe edition album cover at number 15 in their ranking of the best album covers of 2015.

== Track listing ==
Credits adapted from Madonna's official website.

Standard edition
No.	Title	Writer(s)	Producer(s)	Length
1.	"Living for Love"	Madonna; Thomas Pentz; Maureen McDonald; Toby Gad; Ariel Rechtshaid	Madonna; Diplo; Rechtshaid	3:38
2.	"Devil Pray"	Madonna; Tim Bergling; Arash Pournouri; Carl Falk; Rami Yacoub; Savan Kotecha; Dacoury Natche; Michael Tucker	Madonna; Avicii; DJ Dahi; BloodPop	4:05
3.	"Ghosttown"	Madonna; Jason Evigan; Sean Douglas; Evan Bogart	Madonna; Billboard; Evigan	4:09
4.	"Unapologetic Bitch"	Madonna; Pentz; Shelco Garcia; Bryan Orellana; McDonald; Gad	Madonna; Shelco Garcia & Teenwolf; BV; Diplo; Rechtshaid	3:51
5.	"Illuminati"	Madonna; McDonald; Gad; Larry Griffin Jr.; Mike Dean; Kanye West; Ernest Brown; Travis Scott^{[d]}	Madonna; West; Dean; Charlie Heat^{[a]}; Scott^{[b]}	3:44
6.	"Bitch I'm Madonna" (featuring Nicki Minaj)	Madonna; Pentz; Rechtshaid; McDonald; Gad; Onika Maraj; Sophie Xeon	Madonna; Diplo	3:47
7.	"Hold Tight"	Madonna; Pentz; McDonald; Gad; Uzoechi Emenike; Philip Meckseper	Madonna	3:37
8.	"Joan of Arc"	Madonna; Gad; McDonald; Griffin Jr.	Madonna; Gad; Afsheen; Josh Cumbee	4:01
9.	"Iconic" (featuring Chance the Rapper and Mike Tyson)	Madonna; Gad; McDonald; Griffin Jr.; Chancelor Bennett; Natche; Tucker	Madonna; Gad; Afsheen; Cumbee; DJ Dahi^{[b]}; BloodPop^{[b]}	4:33
10.	"HeartBreakCity"	Madonna; Bergling; Pournouri; Tobias Jimson; Michel Flygare; Paloma Stoecker; Salem Al Fakir; Magnus Lidehall; Vincent Pontare	Madonna; Avicii; Fakir; Lidehall; Pontare; Astma & Rocwell	3:33
11.	"Body Shop"	Madonna; Gad; McDonald; Griffin Jr.; Natche; Tucker	Madonna; DJ Dahi; BloodPop; Gad	3:39
12.	"Holy Water"	Madonna; Martin Kierszenbaum; Natalia Kills; Dean; West; Brown	Madonna; Dean; West; Heat^{[a]}	4:09
13.	"Inside Out"	Madonna; Evigan; Douglas; Bogart; Dean	Madonna; Dean	4:23
14.	"Wash All Over Me"	Madonna; Bergling; Pournouri; Fakir; Lidehall; Pontare; Dean; West; Brown	Madonna; Avicii; Dean; West; Heat^{[a]}	4:00
Total length:				55:09

Deluxe edition
No.	Title	Writer(s)	Producer(s)	Length
15.	"Best Night"	Madonna; Pentz; McDonald; Gad; James Napier; Andrew Swanson	Madonna; Diplo	3:33
16.	"Veni Vidi Vici" (featuring Nas)	Madonna; Pentz; Rechtshaid; McDonald; Gad; Nasir Jones; Joel Ma	Madonna; Diplo	4:39
17.	"S.E.X."	Madonna; Gad; McDonald; Griffin Jr.; Dean; West; Brown	Madonna; West; Heat; Dean	4:11
18.	"Messiah"	Madonna; Bergling; Pournouri; Fakir; Lidehall; Pontare	Madonna; Avicii; Fakir; Lidehall; Pontare	3:22
19.	"Rebel Heart"	Madonna; Bergling; Pournouri; Fakir; Lidehall; Pontare	Madonna; Avicii; Fakir; Lidehall; Pontare	3:21
20.	"Auto-Tune Baby"	Madonna; Pentz; Dean; West; Brown	Madonna; Diplo; West; Dean; Heat^{[a]}	4:00
Total length:				78:15

Super deluxe edition disc two
No.	Title	Writer(s)	Producer(s)	Length
1.	"Beautiful Scars"	Madonna; Rick Nowels; Natche; Tucker	Madonna; DJ Dahi; BloodPop	4:19
2.	"Borrowed Time"	Madonna; Bergling; Pournouri; Falk; Yacoub; Kotecha; Natche; Tucker	Madonna; Avicii; Falk; DJ Dahi; BloodPop	3:24
3.	"Addicted"	Madonna; Bergling; Pournouri; Falk; Yacoub; Kotecha	Madonna; Avicii; Falk	3:33
4.	"Graffiti Heart"	Madonna; McDonald; Gad; Griffin Jr.	Madonna; Gad; Afsheen; Cumbee	3:39
5.	"Living for Love" (Paulo & Jackinsky Full Vocal Mix)	Madonna; Pentz; McDonald; Gad; Rechtshaid	Madonna; Diplo; Rechtshaid; Paulo Gois^{[c]}; Alain Jackinsky^{[c]}	7:14
6.	"Living for Love" (Funk Generation & H3drush Dub)	Madonna; Pentz; McDonald; Gad; Rechtshaid	Madonna; Diplo; Rechtshaid; Michael Rizzo^{[c]}; Steve Migliore^{[c]}	6:07
Total length:				28:18

=== Notes ===
- ^{^[a]} signifies a co-producer
- ^{^[b]} signifies an additional producer
- ^{^[c]} signifies a remixer
- ^{^[d]} signifies personnel listed with BMI as songwriter on the song.
- Standard Media Markt edition includes "Auto-Tune Baby" as track 15.
- Fnac deluxe edition includes a bonus disc which features the Thrill Remix and Offer Nissim Dub Mix of "Living for Love".
- Japanese deluxe edition includes the Dirty Pop Remix of "Living for Love".
- Japan deluxe tour edition includes the bonus DVD which features the music videos of "Living for Love", "Ghosttown", "Bitch I'm Madonna", and the Sander Kleinenberg Remix of "Bitch I'm Madonna".
- Digital deluxe edition doesn't include the Paulo & Jackinsky Full Vocal Mix and Funk Generation & H3drush Dub of "Living for Love" on disc two.

== Personnel ==
Personnel adapted from Madonna's official website.

- Madonna – vocals
- Nicki Minaj – vocals
- Chance the Rapper – vocals
- Mike Tyson – vocals
- Nas – vocals
- DJ Dahi – additional vocals (outro), programming
- MNEK – background vocals
- Santell – background vocals
- London Community Gospel Choir – background vocals
- Jason Evigan – background vocals
- Salem Al Fakir – background vocals, marching drums, keys, guitars, orchestra editing
- Vincent Pontare – background vocals, additional background vocals, vocal editing
- Toby Gad – additional background vocals, musician, guitars, programming, instruments, additional programming, mixing
- MoZella – additional background vocals
- Alicia Keys – piano
- Carl Falk – guitars, keyboards, programming
- Avicii – keyboards, programming
- Shelco Garcia & Teenwolf – musician
- Diplo – musician
- Mike Dean – guitar, keyboards and drum programming, key bass, additional programming, mixing, engineering
- Abel Korzeniowski – electric cello
- L.A. Orchestra – musician
- Joacim Ottebjork – bass
- Afsheen – musician, programming, instruments
- Josh Cumbee – musician, programming, instruments
- Stephen Kozmeniuk – musician, programming, instruments
- Dan Warner – programming, instruments (guitar)
- Lee Levin – programming, instruments
- Michael Diamonds – programming
- Magnus Lidehäll – programming
- Demacio "Demo" Castellon – additional programming, engineering, mixing
- Nick Rowe – engineering
- Angie Teo – mixing, additional recording, additional mixing
- Ann Mincieli – additional recording
- Ron Taylor – additional Pro Tools editing
- Noah Goldstein – engineering, mixing
- Aubry "Big Juice" Delaine – engineering
- Zeke Mishanec – additional recording
- Rob Suchecki – additional recording
- Mert and Marcus – photography

== Charts ==
=== Weekly charts ===
Chart (2015)	Peak position
Argentine Albums (CAPIF)	5
Australian Albums (ARIA)	1
Austrian Albums (Ö3 Austria)	1
Belgian Albums (Ultratop Flanders)	1
Belgian Albums (Ultratop Wallonia)	2
Brazilian Albums (Billboard)	1
Canadian Albums (Billboard)	1
Croatian Albums (HDU)	3
Croatian International Albums (HDU)	1
Czech Albums (ČNS IFPI)	1
Danish Albums (Hitlisten)	2
Dutch Albums (Album Top 100)	1
Finnish Albums (Suomen virallinen lista)	2
French Albums (SNEP)	3
German Albums (Offizielle Top 100)	1
Greek Albums (Billboard)	3
Hungarian Albums (MAHASZ)	1
Irish Albums (IRMA)	5
Italian Albums (FIMI)	1
Japanese Albums (Oricon)	8
Japanese International Albums (Oricon)	1
Mexican Albums (Top 100 Mexico)	2
New Zealand Albums (RMNZ)	7
Norwegian Albums (VG-lista)	2
Polish Albums (ZPAV)	5
Portuguese Albums (AFP)	1
Scottish Albums (Official Charts)	3
South Korean Albums (Gaon)	1
South Korean Albums (Gaon) Deluxe version	7
Spanish Albums (Promusicae)	1
Swedish Albums (Sverigetopplistan)	10
Swiss Albums (Schweizer Hitparade)	1
UK Albums (Official Charts)	2
US Billboard 200	2

=== Monthly charts ===
Chart (2015)	Peak position
Argentine Albums (CAPIF)	9
Polish Albums (ZPAV)	12

=== Year-end charts ===
Chart (2015)	Position
Belgian Albums (Ultratop Flanders)	46
Belgian Albums (Ultratop Wallonia)	51
Canadian Albums (Billboard)	39
Croatian International Albums (HDU)	15
Dutch Albums (MegaCharts)	43
French Albums (SNEP)	67
German Albums (Offizielle Top 100)	65
Hungarian Albums (MAHASZ)	28
Hungarian Albums & Compilations (MAHASZ)	36
Italian Albums (FIMI)	22
Japanese Albums (Oricon)	109
Mexican Albums (Top 100 Mexico)	69
South Korean International Albums (Gaon)	23
Spanish Albums (PROMUSICAE)	52
Swiss Albums (Schweizer Hitparade)	61
UK Albums (OCC)	78
US Billboard 200	151
US Top Album Sales (Billboard)	78
Worldwide (IFPI)	39

== Certifications and sales ==
Certifications for Rebel Heart, with pure sales where available
Region	Certification	Certified units/sales
Australia	—	15,000 (Note: Australian sales as of July 2015. In its first two-weeks, the album accumulated sales of 8,274 units according to Paul Cashmere.)
Austria (IFPI Austria)	Gold	7,500^{*}
Brazil (Pro-Música Brasil)	Gold	30,000
Canada	—	18,000 (Note: Canadian sales as of March 2015, according to Nielsen SoundScan.)
France (SNEP)	Gold	52,000
Italy (FIMI)	Platinum	60,000
Japan	—	7,548 (Note: Japanese sales for physical units as of March 2015, according to Oricon.)
Mexico (AMPROFON)	Gold	30,000^{^}
Poland (ZPAV)	Gold	10,000^{‡}
South Korea	—	4,173
Taiwan	—	5,000
United Kingdom (BPI)	Gold	100,000^{‡}
United States	—	238,000
Summaries
Worldwide	—	1,000,000
^{*} Sales figures based on certification alone.^{^} Shipments figures based on certification alone.^{‡} Sales+streaming figures based on certification alone.

== Release history ==
Region	Date	Format	Edition	Distributor	Ref.
Australia	March 6, 2015	CD	Deluxe	Universal Music	
Germany	March 6, 2015	CD	Standard; deluxe; super deluxe; Media Markt standard and deluxe	Universal Music	
France	March 9, 2015	CD	Standard; deluxe; super deluxe; Fnac deluxe	Polydor	
United Kingdom	March 9, 2015	CD	Standard; deluxe; super deluxe	Polydor	
Canada	March 10, 2015	CD	Standard; deluxe	Universal Music	
United States	March 10, 2015	CD	Standard; deluxe; super deluxe; LP	Interscope	
Worldwide	March 10, 2015	Digital download	Standard; deluxe	Interscope	
Brazil	March 11, 2015	CD	Deluxe	Universal Music	
Japan	March 11, 2015	CD	Deluxe	Universal Music	
Japan	March 18, 2015	CD	Super deluxe	Universal Music	
Germany	March 27, 2015	LP	Deluxe	Universal Music	
France	March 30, 2015	LP	Deluxe	Polydor	
United Kingdom	March 30, 2015	LP	Standard	Polydor	
Various	January 1, 2026	Digital download; streaming	Reissue	Warner	
Japan	May 27, 2026	CD	Reissue	Warner	

== See also ==
- List of number-one albums of 2015 (Australia)
- List of number-one hits of 2015 (Austria)
- List of number-one albums of 2015 (Belgium)
- List of number-one albums of 2015 (Canada)
- List of number-one hits of 2015 (Germany)
- List of number-one hits of 2015 (Italy)
- List of number-one albums of 2015 (Netherlands)
- List of number-one albums of 2015 (Portugal)
- List of number-one albums of 2015 (South Korea)
- List of number-one albums of 2015 (Spain)
- List of number-one hits of 2015 (Switzerland)
- List of Downloads Chart number-one albums of the 2010s (UK)
