= Slow Down (Douwe Bob song) =

2016 song by Douwe Bob

Single by Douwe Bob

from the album Fool Bar
- Released: 5 March 2016
- Recorded: 2015
- Genre: Country folk; country pop
- Length: 2:45
- Label: Universal Music Netherlands
- Songwriter(s): Douwe Bob; Jan Peter Hoekstra; Jeroen Overman; Matthijs van Duijvenbode

Douwe Bob singles chronology
"The News" (2015)	"Slow Down" (2016)	"How Lucky We Are" (2016)

Eurovision Song Contest 2016 entry
- Country: Netherlands
- Language: English

Finals performance
- Semi-final result: 5th
- Semi-final points: 197
- Final result: 11th
- Final points: 153

Entry chronology
- ◄ "Walk Along" (2015)
- "Lights and Shadows" (2017) ►

"Slow Down" is a song performed by Dutch singer Douwe Bob. The song represented the Netherlands in the Eurovision Song Contest 2016, and was written by Bob along with Jan Peter Hoekstra, Jeroen Overman, and Matthijs van Duijvenbode. The song was released as a digital download on 5 March 2016 through Universal Music Netherlands as the lead single from his album Fool Bar.

== Eurovision Song Contest ==
Douwe Bob was announced as the Dutch entrant to the Eurovision Song Contest 2016 by Dutch media on 20 September 2015. Two days later, he confirmed the news during the Dutch talk show De Wereld Draait Door. "Slow Down" was revealed as his Eurovision entry on 4 March 2016 during a press conference in Amsterdam. The song was released as a digital download the day after. He performed in the first half of the semi-final. He got through the semi-final and performed in the grand final on Saturday 14 May 2016, coming in 11th place with 153 points.

== Track listing ==
Digital download
No.	Title	Length
1.	"Slow Down"	2:45

== Charts ==
Chart (2016)	Peak position
Austria (Ö3 Austria Top 40)	65
Belgium (Ultratip Bubbling Under Flanders)	7
Netherlands (Single Top 100)	5
Sweden (Sverigetopplistan)	96

== Release history ==
Region	Date	Format	Label
Worldwide	5 March 2016	Digital download	Universal Music Netherlands
