= Fool Bar =

Studio album by Douwe Bob
- Released: 6 May 2016
- Recorded: 2015
- Genre: Pop; country; folk
- Label: Universal Music Group
- Producer: Matthijs van Duijvenbode; Kasper Frenkel

Douwe Bob chronology
Pass It On (2015)	Fool Bar (2016)	The Shape I'm In (2018)

Singles from Fool Bar
- 1. "Slow Down" Released: 5 March 2016

Fool Bar is the third studio album by Dutch singer-songwriter Douwe Bob. It was released in the Netherlands on 6 May 2016, through Universal Music Group. The album peaked at number 2 on the Dutch Albums Chart. The album includes the single "Slow Down", the song represented the Netherlands in the Eurovision Song Contest 2016. The album was produced by Matthijs van Duijvenbode and Kasper Frenkel.

== Reception ==
=== Commercial performance ===
On 14 May 2016 the album debuted at number 4 on the Dutch Albums Chart in its first week of release, later peaking at number 2.

== Singles ==
"Slow Down" was released as the lead single from the album on 5 March 2016. Douwe Bob was announced as the Dutch entrant to the Eurovision Song Contest 2016 by Dutch media on 20 September 2015. Two days later, he confirmed the news during the Dutch talk show De Wereld Draait Door. The song was revealed as his Eurovision entry on 4 March 2016 during a press conference in Amsterdam. He performed in the first half of the semi-final. He got through the semi-final and performed in the Final on 14 May 2016, coming in 11th place with 153 points.

== Track listing ==
Standard listing
No.	Title	Writer(s)	Producer(s)	Length
1.	"Slow Down"	Douwe Bob Posthuma; Jan Peter Hoekstra; Matthijs van Duijvenbode; Jeroen Overman	Matthijs van Duijvenbode; Kasper Frenkel	2:46
2.	"How Lucky We Are"	Posthuma; Hoekstra; van Duijvenbode	van Duijvenbode; Frenkel	3:17
3.	"History"	Posthuma; Hoekstra; van Duijvenbode	van Duijvenbode; Frenkel	3:03
4.	"Settle Down"	Posthuma; Hoekstra; van Duijvenbode	van Duijvenbode; Frenkel	4:21
5.	"It Ain't Easy"	Posthuma; Hoekstra; van Duijvenbode	van Duijvenbode; Frenkel	3:06
6.	"Get Real"	Posthuma; Hoekstra; van Duijvenbode	van Duijvenbode; Frenkel	3:36
7.	"Jacob's Song"	Posthuma; Hoekstra; van Duijvenbode	van Duijvenbode; Frenkel	5:19
8.	"Cynic"	Posthuma; Hoekstra; van Duijvenbode	van Duijvenbode; Frenkel	4:21
9.	"A Damn Good Time"	Posthuma; Hoekstra; van Duijvenbode	van Duijvenbode; Frenkel	2:28
10.	"Take It Off"	Posthuma; Hoekstra; van Duijvenbode	van Duijvenbode; Frenkel	4:04
11.	"Black Jolene"	Posthuma; Hoekstra; van Duijvenbode	van Duijvenbode; Frenkel	3:13
12.	"Love on the Rocks"	Posthuma; Hoekstra; van Duijvenbode	van Duijvenbode; Frenkel	4:28
13.	"Wrote a Song for You" (bonus track)	Posthuma; Hoekstra; van Duijvenbode	van Duijvenbode; Frenkel	2:43

== Chart performance ==
=== Weekly charts ===
Chart (2016)	Peak position
Belgian Albums (Ultratop Flanders)	191
Dutch Albums (Album Top 100)	2

=== Year-end charts ===
Chart (2016)	Position
Dutch Albums (MegaCharts)	41

== Release history ==
Region	Release date	Format	Label
Netherlands	6 May 2016	Digital download; CD	Universal Music Group
