= List of number-one hits of 2015 (Austria) =

This is a list of the Austrian number-one singles and albums of 2015 as compiled by Ö3 Austria Top 40, the official chart provider of Austria.

Issue date	Song	Artist	Album	Artist
2 January	"Take Me to Church"	Hozier	Sing meinen Song – Das Weihnachtskonzert	Various Artists
9 January	"Take Me to Church"	Hozier	Mitten im Leben – Das Tribute Album	Udo Jürgens und seine Gäste
16 January	"Take Me to Church"	Hozier	Mitten im Leben – Das Tribute Album	Udo Jürgens und seine Gäste
23 January	"Take Me to Church"	Hozier	Neujahrskonzert 2015	Vienna Philharmonic / Zubin Mehta
30 January	"Take Me to Church"	Hozier	Farbenspiel	Helene Fischer
6 February	"Take Me to Church"	Hozier	Farbenspiel	Helene Fischer
13 February	"Take Me to Church"	Hozier	Werwolf-Attacke – Monsterball ist überall	Erste Allgemeine Verunsicherung
20 February	"Love Me like You Do"	Ellie Goulding	Werwolf-Attacke – Monsterball ist überall	Erste Allgemeine Verunsicherung
27 February	"Love Me like You Do"	Ellie Goulding	Carlo Cokxxx Nutten 3	Bushido
6 March	"Love Me like You Do"	Ellie Goulding	Fifty Shades of Grey: Original Motion Picture Soundtrack	Various Artists
13 March	"Love Me like You Do"	Ellie Goulding	Schick Schock	Bilderbuch
20 March	"Cheerleader" (Felix Jaehn Remix)	OMI	Rebel Heart	Madonna
27 March	"Are You with Me"	Lost Frequencies	Tracker	Mark Knopfler
3 April	"Are You with Me"	Lost Frequencies	Werwolf-Attacke – Monsterball ist überall	Erste Allgemeine Verunsicherung
10 April	"Are You with Me"	Lost Frequencies	Das letzte Konzert Zürich 2014 – Live	Udo Jürgens mit dem Pepe Lienhard Orchester
17 April	"See You Again"	Wiz Khalifa featuring Charlie Puth	Opposition	Frei.Wild
24 April	"See You Again"	Wiz Khalifa featuring Charlie Puth	Fesch	Seer
1 May	"See You Again"	Wiz Khalifa featuring Charlie Puth	Planktonweed Tape	SpongeBozz
8 May	"See You Again"	Wiz Khalifa featuring Charlie Puth	Chrome	DAT ADAM
15 May	"See You Again"	Wiz Khalifa featuring Charlie Puth	The Demon Diaries	Parov Stelar
22 May	"See You Again"	Wiz Khalifa featuring Charlie Puth	Achter Tag	Genetikk
29 May	"Want to Want Me"	Jason Derulo	Conchita	Conchita Wurst
5 June	"Heroes"	Måns Zelmerlöw	Conchita	Conchita Wurst
12 June	"Heroes"	Måns Zelmerlöw	Mountain Man	Andreas Gabalier
19 June	"Ain't Nobody (Loves Me Better)"	Felix Jaehn featuring Jasmine Thompson	Sing meinen Song – Das Tauschkonzert – Volume 2	Various Artists
26 June	"Waiting for Love"	Avicii	Fata Morgana	KC Rebell
3 July	"Waiting for Love"	Avicii	Sing meinen Song – Das Tauschkonzert – Volume 2	Various Artists
10 July	"Supergirl"	Anna Naklab featuring Alle Farben & YOUNOTUS	Santiago Blue	Die Amigos
17 July	"Supergirl"	Anna Naklab featuring Alle Farben & YOUNOTUS	MTV Unplugged	Cro
24 July	"Reality"	Lost Frequencies featuring Janieck Devy	Sing meinen Song – Das Tauschkonzert – Volume 2	Various Artists
31 July	"Reality"	Lost Frequencies featuring Janieck Devy	Sing meinen Song – Das Tauschkonzert – Volume 2	Various Artists
7 August	"Reality"	Lost Frequencies featuring Janieck Devy	Leider zu gefährlich...	Marc Pircher
14 August	"Drag Me Down"	One Direction	MTV Unplugged	Cro
21 August	"Sugar"	Robin Schulz featuring Francesco Yates	7	Paul Kalkbrenner
28 August	"Sugar"	Robin Schulz featuring Francesco Yates	Lebendig begraben	Dame
4 September	"Schweigeminute (Traiskirchen)"	Raoul Haspel	Burning Bridges	Bon Jovi
11 September	"What Do You Mean?"	Justin Bieber	Bad Magic	Motörhead
18 September	"Schrei nach Liebe"	Die Ärzte	The Book of Souls	Iron Maiden
25 September	"Astronaut"	Sido featuring Andreas Bourani	Liebe Pur	Oliver Haidt
2 October	"Astronaut"	Sido featuring Andreas Bourani	Crosseyed Heart	Keith Richards
9 October	"Astronaut"	Sido featuring Andreas Bourani	Dos Bros	The BossHoss
16 October	"Astronaut"	Sido featuring Andreas Bourani	Bussi	Wanda
23 October	"Astronaut"	Sido featuring Andreas Bourani	Bussi	Wanda
30 October	"Astronaut"	Sido featuring Andreas Bourani	Bussi	Wanda
6 November	"Hello"	Adele	Sounds Good Feels Good	5 Seconds Of Summer
13 November	"Hello"	Adele	Bussi	Wanda
20 November	"Hello"	Adele	CLA$$IC	Bushido & Shindy
27 November	"Ham kummst"	Seiler und Speer	Weihnachten	Helene Fischer & The Royal Philharmonic Orchestra
4 December	"Hello"	Adele	25	Adele
11 December	"Ham kummst"	Seiler und Speer	Weihnachten	Helene Fischer & The Royal Philharmonic Orchestra
18 December	"Ham kummst"	Seiler und Speer	Weihnachten	Helene Fischer & The Royal Philharmonic Orchestra
25 December	"Ham kummst"	Seiler und Speer	Weihnachten	Helene Fischer & The Royal Philharmonic Orchestra
