= Stone Into the River =

Single by Douwe Bob & Ardesko

from the album Born In a Storm
- Released: 19 December 2013
- Recorded: 2012/13
- Genre: Pop
- Length: 3:46
- Label: Rodeo Media

Douwe Bob singles chronology
"Blind Man’s Bluff" (2013)	"Stone Into the River" (2013)	"You Don't Have to Stay" (2014)

"Stone Into the River" is a song by Dutch singer-songwriter Douwe Bob and Ardesko. The song was released in the Netherlands on 19 December 2013 as a digital download. The song was released as the third single from his debut studio album Born In a Storm (2013). The song peaked to number 78 on the Dutch Singles Chart.

== Track listing ==
Digital download
No.	Title	Length
1.	"Stone Into the River"	3:46

== Chart performance ==
=== Weekly charts ===
Chart (2013)	Peak position
Netherlands (Single Top 100)	78

== Release history ==
Region	Date	Format	Label
Netherlands	19 December 2013	Digital download	Rodeo Media
