= Hold Me (Anouk and Douwe Bob song) =

Single by Anouk and Douwe Bob

from the album Paradise and Back Again and Pass It On
- Released: 16 January 2015
- Length: 3:49
- Label: Universal Music Group
- Songwriter(s): Anouk Teeuwe; Bart van Veen
- Producer(s): Anouk Teeuwe; Matthijs van Duijvenbode

Anouk singles chronology
"Places to Go" (2014)	"Hold Me" (2015)	"Feet on the Ground" (2015)

Douwe Bob singles chronology
"Mine Again" (2014)	"Hold Me" (2015)	"Pass It On" (2015)

"Hold Me" is a song by Dutch singer-songwriter's Anouk and Douwe Bob. The song was released in the Netherlands on 16 January 2015 as a digital download. The song was released as the lead single from Douwe Bob's second studio album Pass It On (2015). The song peaked to number 2 on the Dutch Singles Chart.

== Track listing ==
Digital download
No.	Title	Length
1.	"Hold Me"	3:49

== Chart performance ==
=== Weekly charts ===
Chart (2015)	Peak position
Netherlands (Single Top 100)	2

== Release history ==
Region	Date	Format	Label
Netherlands	16 January 2015	Digital download	Universal Music Group
