= Hold Tight (Madonna song) =

Single by Madonna

from the album Rebel Heart
- Released: July 24, 2015
- Recorded: 2014
- Studio: The Ritz (Moscow, Russia); Grand Marina Hotel (Barcelona, Spain); Patriot (Denver, Colorado and Venice, California)
- Genre: Pop; electro
- Length: 3:37
- Label: Interscope
- Songwriters: Madonna; Thomas Wesley Pentz; Maureen McDonald; Tobias Gad; Ariel Rechtshaid; Uzoechi Emenike
- Producer: Madonna

Madonna singles chronology
"Bitch I'm Madonna" (2015)	"Hold Tight" (2015)	"Medellín" (2019)

Licensed audio
- "Madonna - Hold Tight (Official Audio)" on YouTube

"Hold Tight" is a song recorded and produced by American singer Madonna from her thirteenth studio album, Rebel Heart (2015). She co-wrote the track with Diplo, MoZella, Toby Gad, Ariel Rechtshaid, and MNEK. A demo of "Hold Tight" was leaked onto the internet on December 22, 2014, while its final version was released by Madonna on February 9, 2015 on the iTunes Store. The song was later sent to Italian radio on July 24, 2015, as the third single from Rebel Heart in that country.

"Hold Tight" is a midtempo pop song, incorporating military drums, atmospheric keyboards, and flourishes of electronics in its instrumentation. Lyrically, the song talks about love triumphing through tough times, with a message of holding onto one another and being strong. The song received mixed reviews from music critics: some praised its chorus and picked it as a standout track, while others named it dull and generic. The song charted in several European territories, reaching the top 40 in Finland, Hungary, and Spain.

== Background and release ==
Initially, Madonna was set to release her thirteenth studio album, Rebel Heart, in March 2015, with its lead single set to premiere on Valentine's Day of the same year. However, fifteen demos of her songs were leaked to the Internet between November and December 2014, which led the singer to release six completed tracks on iTunes as pre-order for the album on December 20, 2014. Three days later, fourteen other tracks leaked online, including the demo version of "Hold Tight". On February 9, 2015, Madonna released three more tracks from the album, including the finished version of "Hold Tight", "Iconic" and "Joan of Arc", as well as the album's track list.

After its full release, some websites suggested that Ryan Tedder was the song's producer, since he had confirmed that he was working on material for Rebel Heart, claiming that the songs were "[Madonna's] best stuff in over a decade" and that "[t]he tracks [he did] with her are really hard to explain". However, Tedder's productions were not used in the album's final track list, although rumors claimed him to be the producer of "Hold Tight". Later, Diplo was rumored to be its producer, but eventually it was confirmed on Madonna's official website that she produced the track herself. "Hold Tight" was selected as the third single from Rebel Heart in Italy, and was added to the country's radio stations on July 24, 2015.

== Recording and composition ==
"Hold Tight"
A 21-second sample of "Hold Tight" displaying its "tribal" chorus with instrumentation such as atmospheric keyboards, military drums and flourishes of pastel electronics

"Hold Tight" was written and produced by Madonna, with additional writing by Diplo, Toby Gad, MoZella, Ariel Rechtshaid and MNEK; the latter also provided background vocals. Demacio "Demo" Castellon and Nick Rowe were the song's engineers, while Castellon and Mike Dean did the song's mixing. Additional recording was done by Angie Teo, while additional Pro Tools editing was made by Ron Taylor. "Hold Tight" was recorded in four different places: The Ritz (Moscow), Grand Marina Hotel (Barcelona) and Patriot Studios (Denver, Colorado / Venice, California).

MNEK, who co-wrote and provided background vocals on the track, remembered that he was working with English duo Gorgon City in 2014, when they recommended him to Diplo, for working on Rebel Heart. Together they started out with an idea for "Hold Tight", and Madonna loved it. After finishing writing the lyrics, she invited MNEK to the recording studio to finish its production. The rapper was satisfied with the outcome and described the sessions as "cool" and recalled Madonna giving him chocolate peanut butter sweets in the studio.

"Hold Tight" is a "reflective and sombre" midtempo pop and electro ballad, having atmospheric keyboards, military drums and flourishes of pastel electronics as its main instrumentation. Its "tribal" chorus "gallops euphorically over twinkling arpeggio, picked out by a Juno whistle", which according to The Quietus' Amy Pettifer, is "reminiscent of Kate Bush's "Running Up That Hill"". John Marrs of Gay Times noted the song's synths remind of Confessions on a Dance Floor's "Forbidden Love" and the "euphoric instrumentals" of British electronica band Faithless. Lyrically, the song talks about holding on and being strong, with Madonna singing about being "scarred and bruised". For Adam R. Holz of Plugged In, the song permeates in the same lyrical content of "Living for Love", while Pettifer noted that it's "a galvanising anthem of shoulder-to-shoulder survival that's collective and communal, rather than intimate and romantic."

== Critical reception ==
Joe Lynch of Billboard described the song as "an immediately familiar track with an epic, arresting chorus." Lewis Corner of Digital Spy gave emphasis to "the space Madonna's voice is given to shine—something we'd like to hear more often". Lauren Murphy of The Irish Times described it as an "old-school pop" song and picked it as a standout track, while John Marrs of Gay Times claimed that "the mid-tempo track underpinned by a dirty bass bears little resemblance to the sparse, pedestrian demo," also noting that "when the melody is lush as this, she could be singing a recipe from Mary Berry's cookbook as far as we care." Amy Pettifer of The Quietus saw it as "Shakira's 'Whenever, Wherever' as seen through the murky lens of a lost generation."

Sam C. Mac of Slant Magazine called it a "perfectly acceptable album filler: innocuous, lyrically platitudinous pop that briefly works itself up into something exciting when it threatens to become a gospelized stomp." However, Mac noted that "[i]t wouldn't be particularly lamentable were it not for the fact that there are so many better choices for the standard edition of the album that have been relegated to bonus tracks." Ludovic Hunter-Tilney of Financial Times called it a "dull ballad", while for Saeed Saeed of The National the song "is the first of a few tracks that should have been cut," criticizing its "atmospheric keyboards" for being "sleep-inducing." Evan Sawdey of PopMatters named it one of the album's "forgettable jams" and a "generic thump," meanwhile Lydia Jenkins of The New Zealand Herald opined that "Hold Tight" has "so little substance [that] it seems wrong to call it a song."

== Chart performance ==
Following its digital release on February 9, 2015 as an "instant grat" for pre-ordering the album, "Hold Tight" entered the record charts of several countries. In the United Kingdom, the song was unable to enter the UK Singles Chart, but it reached number 97 on its download chart. It also charted at number 92 on the singles chart compiled by Syndicat National de l'Édition Phonographique in France. "Hold Tight" had top 40 entries in Spain and Hungary, as well as on the digital charts of Finland and Sweden.

== Credits and personnel ==
Personnel adapted from Madonna's official website.

=== Management ===
- Webo Girl Publishing, Inc. (ASCAP) / Songs Music Publishing, LLC o/b/o I Like Turtles Music, Songs of SMP (ASCAP) / EMI April Music, Inc. and Mo Zella Mo Music (ASCAP).
- Atlas Music Publishing o/b/o itself and Gadfly Songs (ASCAP) / Digital Teddy Ltd. (Copyright Control) (PRS) / Jack Russell Music Limited (PRS).
- Recorded at The Ritz (Moscow), Grand Marina Hotel (Barcelona) and Patriot Studios (Denver, Colorado / Venice, California).
- MNEK appears courtesy of Virgin EMI Records, a division of Universal Music Operations.

=== Personnel ===
- Madonna – vocals, songwriter, producer
- Diplo – songwriter
- MoZella – songwriter
- Toby Gad – songwriter
- Ariel Rechtshaid – songwriter
- Jimmy Austin- songwriter
- MNEK – songwriter, background vocals
- Demacio "Demo" Castellon – engineer, audio mixer, recording
- Mike Dean – audio mixer
- Nick Rowe – engineer
- Angie Teo – additional recording
- Ron Taylor – Pro Tools

== Charts ==
Chart (2014–2015)	Peak position
Finland Download (Latauslista)	28
France (SNEP)	92
Hong Kong (HKRIA)	14
Hungary (Single Top 40)	27
Italy (Musica e dischi)	36
San Marino (RTV)	34
Spain Singles Sales (PROMUSICAE)	37
Sweden (DigiListan)	34
UK Singles Downloads (Official Charts)	97

== Release history ==
Release dates and formats for "Hold Tight"
Region	Date	Format	Label	Ref.
Italy	July 24, 2015	Radio airplay	Universal	
