= Multicoloured Angels =

Single by Douwe Bob

from the album Born In a Storm
- Released: 21 September 2012
- Recorded: 2012
- Genre: Pop
- Length: 3:08
- Label: Rodeo Media
- Songwriter(s): Douwe Bob

Douwe Bob singles chronology
"Multicoloured Angels" (2012)	"Blind Man’s Bluff" (2013)

"Multicoloured Angels" is a song by Dutch singer-songwriter Douwe Bob. The song was released in the Netherlands on 21 September 2012 as a digital download. The song was released as the lead single from his debut studio album Born In a Storm (2013). The song peaked to number 4 on the Dutch Singles Chart.

== Track listing ==
Digital download
No.	Title	Length
1.	"Multicoloured Angels"	3:08

== Chart performance ==
=== Weekly charts ===
Chart (2012)	Peak position
Netherlands (Single Top 100)	4

== Release history ==
Region	Date	Format	Label
Netherlands	21 September 2012	Digital download	Rodeo Media
