= Born in a Storm =

Born In a Storm

Studio album by Douwe Bob
- Released: 3 May 2013
- Recorded: 2012
- Genre: Pop
- Label: Rodeomedia.nl

Douwe Bob chronology
Born In a Storm (2013)	Pass It On (2015)

Singles from Born In a Storm
- 1. "Multicoloured Angels" Released: 21 September 2012; 2. "Blind Man's Bluff" Released: 24 January 2013; 3. "Stone Into the River" Released: 19 December 2013; 4. "You Don't Have to Stay" Released: 15 April 2014

Born In a Storm is the debut studio album by Dutch singer-songwriter Douwe Bob. It was released in the Netherlands on 3 May 2013, through Rodeomedia.nl. The album has peaked to number 7 on the Dutch Albums Chart. The album includes the singles "Multicoloured Angels", "Stone Into the River" and "You Don't Have to Stay".

== Singles ==
"Multicoloured Angels" was released as the lead single from the album on 21 September 2012. The song peaked to number 4 on the Dutch Singles Chart. "Blind Man's Bluff" was released as the second single from the album on 24 January 2013. "Stone Into the River" was released as the third single from the album on 19 December 2013. The song peaked to number 78 on the Dutch Singles Chart. "You Don't Have to Stay" was released as the fourth single from the album on 15 April 2014.

== Track listing ==
Standard listing
No.	Title	Length
1.	"Judge, Jury & Executioner"	3:49
2.	"Blind Man's Bluff"	2:44
3.	"You Don't Have to Stay"	2:26
4.	"Eliza Jane"	4:26
5.	"Born In a Storm"	4:32
6.	"Multicoloured Angels"	3:08
7.	"I Smoke and I Drink"	3:56
8.	"Beautiful"	2:56
9.	"Stone Into the River"	4:22
10.	"Life Weighs Heavy"	3:31
11.	"Give It to Me"	3:05
12.	"She Knows"	3:38
13.	"I Gave Them"	2:35

== Chart performance ==
=== Weekly charts ===
Chart (2013)	Peak position
Dutch Albums (Album Top 100)	7

== Release history ==
Region	Release date	Format	Label
Netherlands	3 May 2013	Digital download; CD	Rodeomedia.nl
