= Pass It On (Douwe Bob album) =

Studio album by Douwe Bob
- Released: 15 May 2015
- Recorded: 2012
- Genre: Pop
- Label: Universal Music Group

Douwe Bob chronology
Born In a Storm (2013)	Pass It On (2015)	Fool Bar (2016)

Singles from Pass It On
- 1. "Hold Me" Released: 16 January 2015

Pass It On is the second studio album by Dutch singer-songwriter Douwe Bob. It was released in the Netherlands on 15 May 2015, through Universal Music Group. The album has peaked to number 1 on the Dutch Albums Chart. The album includes the single "Hold Me".

== Singles ==
"Hold Me" was released as the lead single from the album on 16 January 2015. The song peaked to number 2 on the Dutch Singles Chart.

== Track listing ==
Standard listing
No.	Title	Length
1.	"Pass It On"	3:04
2.	"Can’t Slow Down"	2:39
3.	"Take It All"	3:33
4.	"Sugar"	3:12
5.	"Doctor"	2:56
6.	"Sweet Sunshine"	3:02
7.	"Hollywood"	4:19
8.	"Morning Sunset"	3:04
9.	"Gini"	3:48
10.	"The News"	3:31
11.	"We’ll Be Gone"	2:21
12.	"Fine Line"	3:49
13.	"Hold Me" (with. Anouk)	3:51

== Chart performance ==
=== Weekly charts ===
Chart (2015)	Peak position
Dutch Albums (Album Top 100)	1

=== Year-end charts ===
Chart (2015)	Position
Dutch Albums (Album Top 100)	50

== Release history ==
Region	Release date	Format	Label
Netherlands	15 May 2015	Digital download; CD	Universal Music Group
