= Douwe Bob =

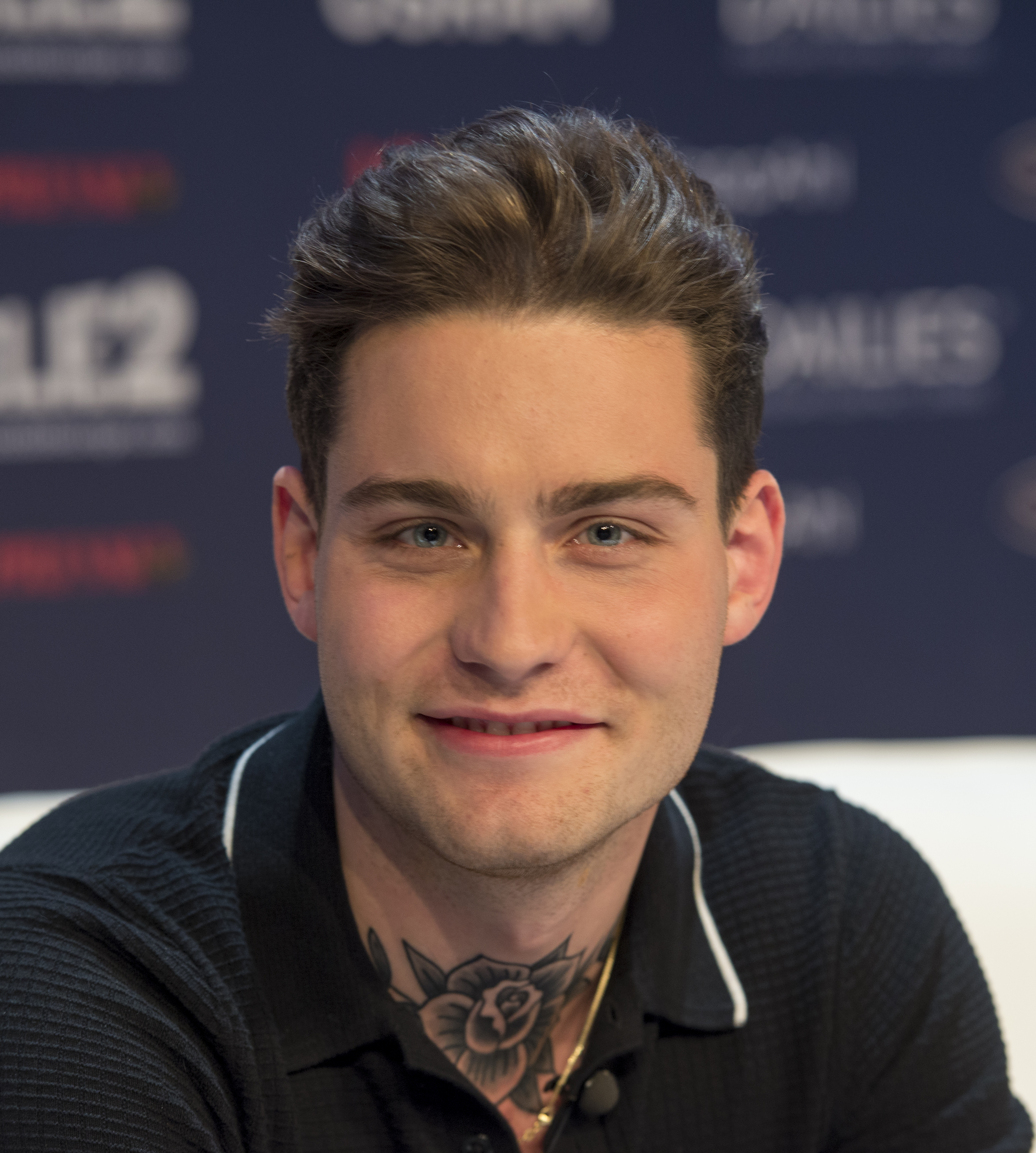
- Douwe Bob in 2016

Background information
- Born: Douwe Bob Posthuma; 12 December 1992 (age 33); Amsterdam, Netherlands
- Genres: Country; pop; folk; indie folk
- Occupations: Singer-songwriter
- Instruments: Piano; guitar
- Years active: 2012–present
- Label: Universal

Douwe Bob Posthuma (born 12 December 1992), professionally known by only his first and middle names Douwe Bob (Dutch pronunciation: [ˈdʌuə ˈbɔp]), is a Dutch singer-songwriter. He won the Dutch talent show De beste singer-songwriter van Nederland. He specializes in folk and country music and has released four albums. He represented the Netherlands in the Eurovision Song Contest 2016.

== Early life ==
Douwe Bob Posthuma was born on 12 December 1992 in Amsterdam in the Netherlands. He was born into a Frisian family. His father, Simon Posthuma, is known for being a member of The Fool design collective.

Douwe Bob started playing piano at the age of 6, initially concentrating on classical music and jazz. He took up the guitar at age 14. As a singer he was inspired by country, folk and pop music from the 1950s to the mid-1970s.

== Career ==
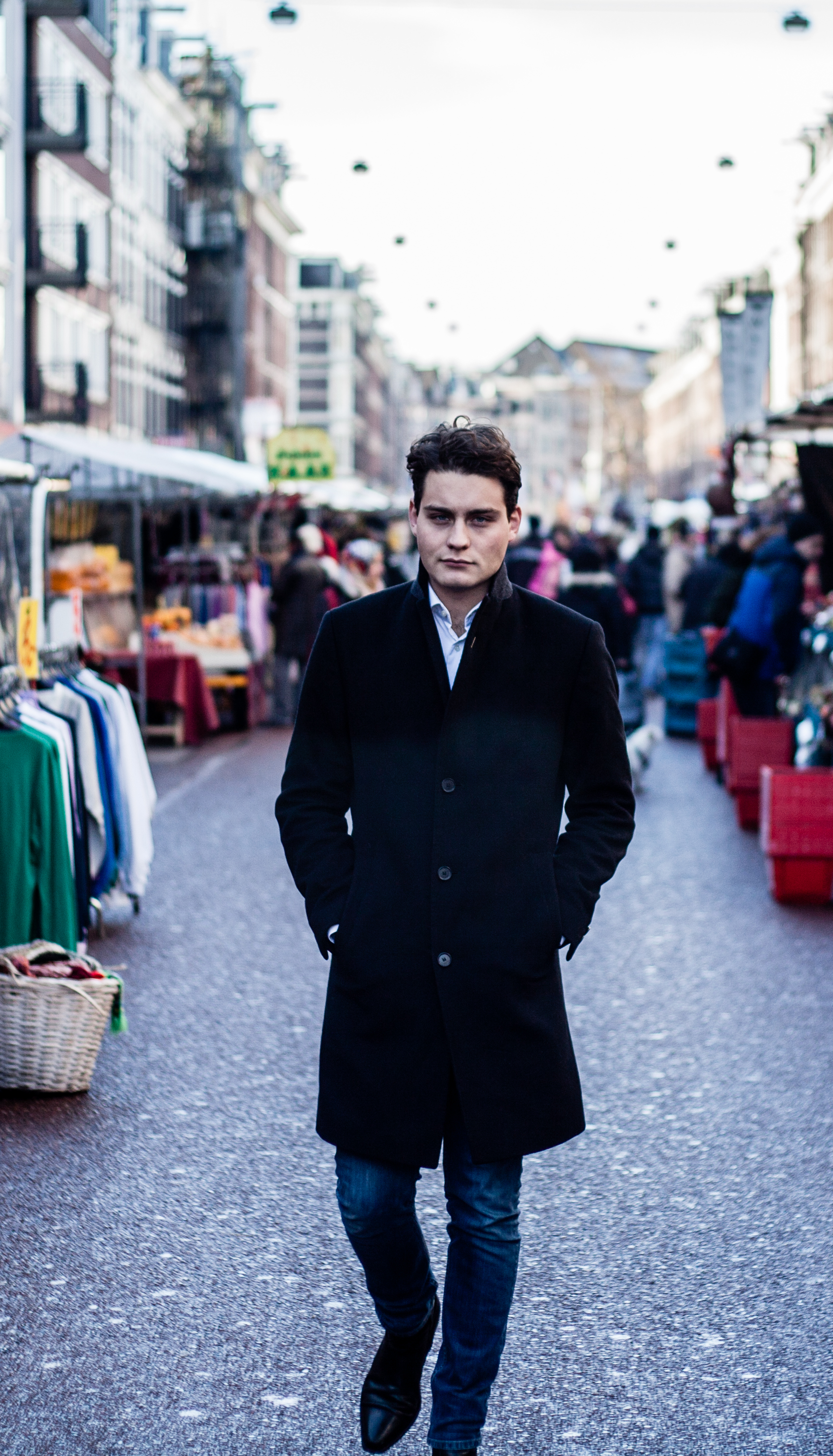
Douwe Bob in December 2015.

=== 2012–2013: Born in a Storm ===
In 2012, he competed in the Dutch TV talent show De beste singer-songwriter van Nederland (The Best Singer-Songwriter of the Netherlands). He played the songs "Standing Here Helpless", "Icarus", and in the finale, "Multicoloured Angels". In the finale, he was joined by Dutch singer Tim Knol and the latter's band. He won the finals and "Multicoloured Angels" reached number 17 in the weekly music chart Dutch Top 40. His debut album, Born in a Storm, was released on 3 May 2013. The bulk of the songs were written during a holiday in Morocco with Matthijs van Duijvenbode. In June 2013, Douwe Bob played at the Pinkpop Festival. At the end of 2013, he appeared in the documentary Whatever Forever: Douwe Bob to talk about his relationship with his father Simon Posthuma, during IDFA.

=== 2014–2015: Pass It On ===
In 2014, Douwe Bob became one of the Ambassadors of Freedom for the Bevrijdingsfestival. In January 2015, he released the single "Hold Me", produced in collaboration with Anouk. In February 2015, Douwe Bob announced his new album Pass It On. The album was released on 15 May 2015 by record company Universal Music Group.

=== 2016–2017: Eurovision Song Contest and Fool Bar ===
On 6 May 2016, he released his third studio album Fool Bar by record company Universal Music Group. The album peaked at number four on the Dutch Albums Chart. Douwe Bob represented his country in the Eurovision Song Contest 2016 in Stockholm, where he performed the song "Slow Down" in the semi-finals and finals on 10 and 14 May 2016. He placed eleventh in the final, racking up a total of 153 points. He was the Dutch spokesperson for the Eurovision Song Contest 2017.

=== 2018–present: The Shape I'm In and Singel 39 ===
On 21 April 2017, Douwe Bob was announced as the fourth coach of the seventh season of The Voice Kids, which started on 23 February 2018. In the following season, he did not return and was replaced by Anouk. On 9 November 2018, Douwe Bob released his fourth studio album The Shape I'm In, which he described as being a break-up record. In 2019, he composed the title song for the Dutch feature film Singel 39. He also played a small role in the film. The film won the Golden Film award after having sold 100,000 tickets.

Douwe Bob appeared in the 2023 season of The Masked Singer.

On 29 June 2025, Douwe Bob walked off stage at a performance for a Dutch Jewish community youth event, citing the presence of posters and pamphlets belonging to the Dutch wing of Zionist youth organization Netzer Olami. The singer and his family were forced to go into hiding abroad after being doxed and receiving death threats.

== Personal life ==
On 10 March 2016, in an interview with OutTV, Douwe Bob revealed that he identifies as bisexual.

Posthuma has three children: a daughter with Loes van Delft; a second daughter with an unknown woman; and a son with former girlfriend Anouk.

== Discography ==
=== Albums ===
Title	Details	Peak chart positions	
Title	Details	NL	BEL (FL)
Born in a Storm	Released: 3 May 2013; Label: Rodeomedia.nl; Format: Digital download, CD	7	—
Pass It On	Released: 15 May 2015; Label: Universal Music Group; Format: Digital download, CD	1	—
Fool Bar	Released: 6 May 2016; Label: Universal Music Group; Format: Digital download, CD	2	191
The Shape I'm In	Released: 9 November 2018; Label: Universal Music Group; Format: Digital download, CD	5	—
Born to Win, Born to Lose	Released: 28 May 2021; Label: Universal Music Group; Format: Digital download, CD	3	—
Where Did All the Cool Kids Go?	Released: 14 February 2024; Label: V2; Format: Digital download, CD	4	73
I Believe in Fairy Tales – Theatertour 2025	Released: 25 July 2025; Label: V2; Format: Digital download, LP	55	—
Outcast Town	Released: 17 April 2026; Label: V2; Format: Digital download, LP, CD	19	—
"—" denotes an album that did not chart or was not released.

=== Singles ===
Title	Year	Peak chart positions					Album
Title	Year	NL	AUT	BEL (FL)	SUR	SWE	Album
"Multicoloured Angels"	2012	4	—	—	—	—	Born in a Storm
"You Don't Have to Stay"	2013	—	—	—	—	—	Born in a Storm
"Blind Man's Bluff"	2013	—	—	—	—	—	Born in a Storm
"Stone Into the River"	2013	54	—	—	—	—	Born in a Storm
"Mine Again"	2014	—	—	—	—	—	Non-album single
"Hold Me" (with Anouk)	2015	2	—	—	—	—	Pass It On
"Pass It On"	2015	52	—	—	—	—	Pass It On
"Sweet Sunshine"	2015	45	—	—	—	—	Pass It On
"The News"	2015	48	—	—	—	—	Pass It On
"Slow Down"	2016	5	65	57	—	96	Fool Bar
"How Lucky We Are"	2016	57	—	—	—	—	Fool Bar
"Shine"	2018	41	—	— (Note: "Shine" did not enter the Tipparade of Flanders, but did enter the Bubbling Under (as a Tip))	—	—	The Shape I'm In
"I Do" (with Jacqueline Govaert)	2018	65	—	—	—	—	The Shape I'm In
"Consider"	2019	56	—	—	—	—	The Shape I'm In
"Summer in Your Eyes"	2019	—	—	— (Note: "Summer in Your Eyes" did not enter the Ultratop 50, but peaked at number 23 on the Flemish Ultratip chart.)	—	—	Non-album singles
"Until Then"	2020	—	—	—	—	—	Non-album singles
"What a Wonderful World"	2020	—	—	—	—	—	Non-album singles
"Hold On"	2020	—	—	—	—	—	Non-album singles
"Was It Just Me"	2021	—	—	—	—	—	Non-album singles
"This World Is Our Home"	2023	33	—	—	21	—	Where Did All the Cool Kids Go?
"Nothing to Lose"	2024	66	—	—	—	—	Where Did All the Cool Kids Go?
"Could Have Been Us" with Sera)	2024	—	—	—	—	—	Outcast Town
"Angel Child"	2025	—	—	—	—	—	Outcast Town
"Nog even blijven" (with Meau)	2025	12	—	15	—	—	Non-album singles
"Please Just Come Home" (with Miss Montreal)	2025	87	—	—	—	—	Non-album singles
"What If I Told You" (with Armin van Buuren)	2026	80	—	—	—	—	Non-album singles
"—" denotes a single that did not chart or was not released.

=== Music videos ===
Title	Year
"Life Weighs Heavy"	2013
"Slow Down"	2016
"How Lucky We Are"	2016
"Shine"	2018
"Ready or Not"	2021

== Notes ==
Achievements
Preceded by Trijntje Oosterhuis with "Walk Along"	Netherlands in the Eurovision Song Contest; 2016; With: "Slow Down"	Succeeded by O'G3NE with "Lights and Shadows"
