= Nicholas Rowe (producer) =

- Born: Nicholas Christopher Rowe; May 4, 1981 (age 45); Chapel Hill, North Carolina, U.S.
- Education: New York University
- Occupations: Record producer, guitarist, audio engineer, songwriter, mixing engineer
- Years active: 2002–present
- Spouse: Kelly Mickle (m. 2013)
- Children: 2

Nicholas Christopher Rowe (born May 4, 1981) is an American record producer, audio engineer, mixing engineer, songwriter and multi-instrumentalist. He is the former guitarist of the New York City alternative metal band Bloodsimple, and won a Grammy Award for his work on the Vampire Weekend record Modern Vampires of the City

== Studio albums ==
Title	Year	Singer	Engineer	Vocal editing
"Living For Love"	2014-15	Madonna	check	
"Unapologetic Bitch"	2014-15	Madonna	check	
"Hold Tight"	2014-15	Madonna	check	
"Bitch I’m Madonna"	2014-15	Madonna	check	
"Veni Vidi Vici"	2014-15	Madonna	check	
"Best Night"	2014-15	Madonna	check	
"Reincarnated" (whole album)	2013	Snoop Dogg (LION)	check	
"Nuclear Seasons"	2012	Charli XCX		check
"Take My Hand"	2012	Charli XCX		check
"Black Roses"	2012	Charli XCX		check
"How Can I"	2012	Charli XCX		check
"Lock You Up"	2012	Charli XCX		check
"Doing It"	2014	Charli XCX		check
"Hanging Around"	2014	Charli XCX		check
"Need Ur Luv"	2014	Charli XCX	check	check
"Kingdom (feat. Simon Le Bon)—Hunger Games Soundtrack"	2014	Charli XCX		check
"Digging Up The Heart"	2015	Brandon Flowers	check	
"Can’t Deny My Love"	2015	Brandon Flowers	check	
"Between Me And You"	2015	Brandon Flowers	check	
"Never Get You Right"	2015	Brandon Flowers	check	
"Lonely Town"	2015	Brandon Flowers	check	
"Dreams Come True"	2015	Brandon Flowers	check	
"Still Want You"	2015	Brandon Flowers	check	
"Desired Effect"	2015	Brandon Flowers	check	
"Look Alive"	2015	Brandon Flowers	check	
"Obvious Bicycle"	2013	Vampire Weekend	check	
"Unbelievers"	2013	Vampire Weekend	check	
"Step"	2013	Vampire Weekend	check	
"Diane Young"	2013	Vampire Weekend	check	
"Hannah Hunt"	2013	Vampire Weekend	check	
"Everlasting Arms"	2013	Vampire Weekend	check	
"Finger Back"	2013	Vampire Weekend	check	
"Worship You"	2013	Vampire Weekend	check	
"Ya Hey"	2013	Vampire Weekend	check	
"Falling"	2013	HAIM	check	
"Forever"	2013	HAIM	check	
"The Wire"	2013	HAIM	check	
"Honey & I"	2013	HAIM	check	
"Days Are Gone"	2013	HAIM	check	
"My Song 5"	2013	HAIM	check	
"Go Slow"	2013	HAIM	check	
"Let Me Go"	2013	HAIM	check	
"Running If You Call My Name"	2013	HAIM	check	
"Pray 2 Gawd"	2013	HAIM	check	
"Boys"	2013	Sky Ferreira	check	
"24 Hours"	2013	Sky Ferreira	check	
"Nobody Asked Me (If I Was Okay)"	2013	Sky Ferreira	check	
"You’re Not The One"	2013	Sky Ferreira	check	
"Heavy Metal Heart"	2013	Sky Ferreira	check	
"Love In Stereo"	2013	Sky Ferreira	check	
"Black Soap"	2014	EX-COPS		check
"White Noise"	2014	EX-COPS		check
"Daggers" (Co-produced)	2014	EX-COPS	check	check
"Pretty S****y"	2014	EX-COPS		check
"Modern World"	2014	EX-COPS		check
"Rooms"	2014	EX-COPS		check
"That’s Why God Made The Radio" (Guitar)	2012	Beach Boys		
"No Pier Pressure" (album)	2015	Brian Wilson		check
"Any Emotions"(Mini Mansions song featuring Brian Wilson)	2015	Brian Wilson		check
"VII: Sturm und Drang"	2015	Lamb of God	check	
"Killin’ Me"	2015	Matt and Kim		check
"ICYA"	2015	Matt and Kim		check
"Place You Know"	2015	Matt and Kim		check
"Lights"	2015	Hurts		
"Skin"	2014	Rae Morris	check	
"Closer" (Bass)	2014	Rae Morris	check	
"For You"	2014	Rae Morris	check	
"Don’t Go"	2014	Rae Morris	check	
"Do You Even Know?"	2014	Rae Morris	check	
"Not Knowing"	2014	Rae Morris	check	
"This Is Not A Party"	2015	Wombats	check	
"Love in the Middle of a Firefight"	2014	Dillon Francis		check
"If Only"	2014	Kylie Minogue		check
"Golden Boy"	2014	Kylie Minogue		check
"House" (whole record)-Pro Tools Editing	2015	Young Buffalo		check
"Kids"		Mikky Ekko		check
"In The Beginning" (co-writer of whole record)	2014	WOLFBORNE		
"Completely Not Me"	2014	Jenny Lewis		check
"Reach for the Stars"	2013	Major Lazer feat Wyclef Jean		check
"Only Revolutions" (whole album)—Pro Tools editing	2010	Biffy Clyro		
"Opposites " (whole album)—Pro Tools editing	2013	Biffy Clyro		
"Losing You"	2012	Solange		check
"All That"	2015	Carly Rae Jepsen		check
"A Cruel World"	2005	Bloodsimple		
"Red Harvest"	2007	Bloodsimple		
