= Iconic (Madonna song) =

2015 song by Madonna

Song by Madonna featuring Chance the Rapper and Mike Tyson

from the album Rebel Heart
- Released: February 9, 2015
- Recorded: 2014
- Genre: EDM; hip hop; dance-pop
- Length: 4:33
- Label: Interscope
- Songwriters: Madonna; Toby Gad; Maureen McDonald; Larry Griffin Jr.; Chancelor Bennett; Dacoury Natche; Michael Tucker
- Producers: Madonna; Gad; Afsheen; Josh Cumbee; DJ Dahi (additional); BloodPop (additional)

Rebel Heart track listing
- 24 tracks: 1. "Living for Love"; 2. "Devil Pray"; 3. "Ghosttown"; 4. "Unapologetic Bitch"; 5. "Illuminati"; 6. "Bitch I'm Madonna"; 7. "Hold Tight"; 8. "Joan of Arc"; 9. "Iconic"; 10. "HeartBreakCity"; 11. "Body Shop"; 12. "Holy Water"; 13. "Inside Out"; 14. "Wash All Over Me"; Deluxe edition: 15. "Best Night"; 16. "Veni Vidi Vici"; 17. "S.E.X."; 18. "Messiah"; 19. "Rebel Heart"; Media Markt deluxe edition: 20. "Auto-Tune Baby"; Super deluxe edition (Disc 2): 1. "Beautiful Scars"; 2. "Borrowed Time"; 3. "Addicted"; 4. "Graffiti Heart"

Licensed audio
- "Madonna feat. Chance The Rapper & MikeTyson - Iconic (Official Audio)" on YouTube

"Iconic" is a song recorded by American singer and songwriter Madonna for her thirteenth studio album Rebel Heart (2015). It features American rapper Chance the Rapper and a spoken intro by American professional boxer Mike Tyson. It was written by Madonna and Chance themselves, alongside Toby Gad, Maureen McDonald, Larry Griffin Jr., Dacoury Natche and Michael Tucker. "Iconic" was also produced by Madonna herself, alongside Gad, Afsheen and Josh Cumbee, while DJ Dahi and Tucker served as additional producers. The song was recorded in 2014, and its demo was leaked onto the internet on December 17 that same year, alongside twelve other tracks from the album, with "Iconic" also being rumored as the album's title. Its final version was released on February 9, 2015, alongside fellow album tracks "Hold Tight" and "Joan of Arc", on the iTunes store.

A trap-influenced EDM, hip hop and dance-pop song, "Iconic" features in its instrumentation "ice-cold" synths, marching drums and "booming" bass, as well as machinic stabs and electronic gears. Lyrically, the song encourages people to take control of their life, to pursue their dreams and to find their own greatness. Upon its release, the song received generally favorable reviews from critics, who praised the song's "weird" beat and odd collaboration, recognizing its catchiness. Although, some criticized Tyson's addition and were confused with the song's message. It charted in some European territories, peaking inside the top-forty in Finland, Hungary and Spain. Madonna performed the track as the opening number of the Rebel Heart Tour (2015–16). During the performance, she is inside a medieval-looking cage in a kimono-like robe, with her dancers being dressed as gladiators.

== Background and release ==
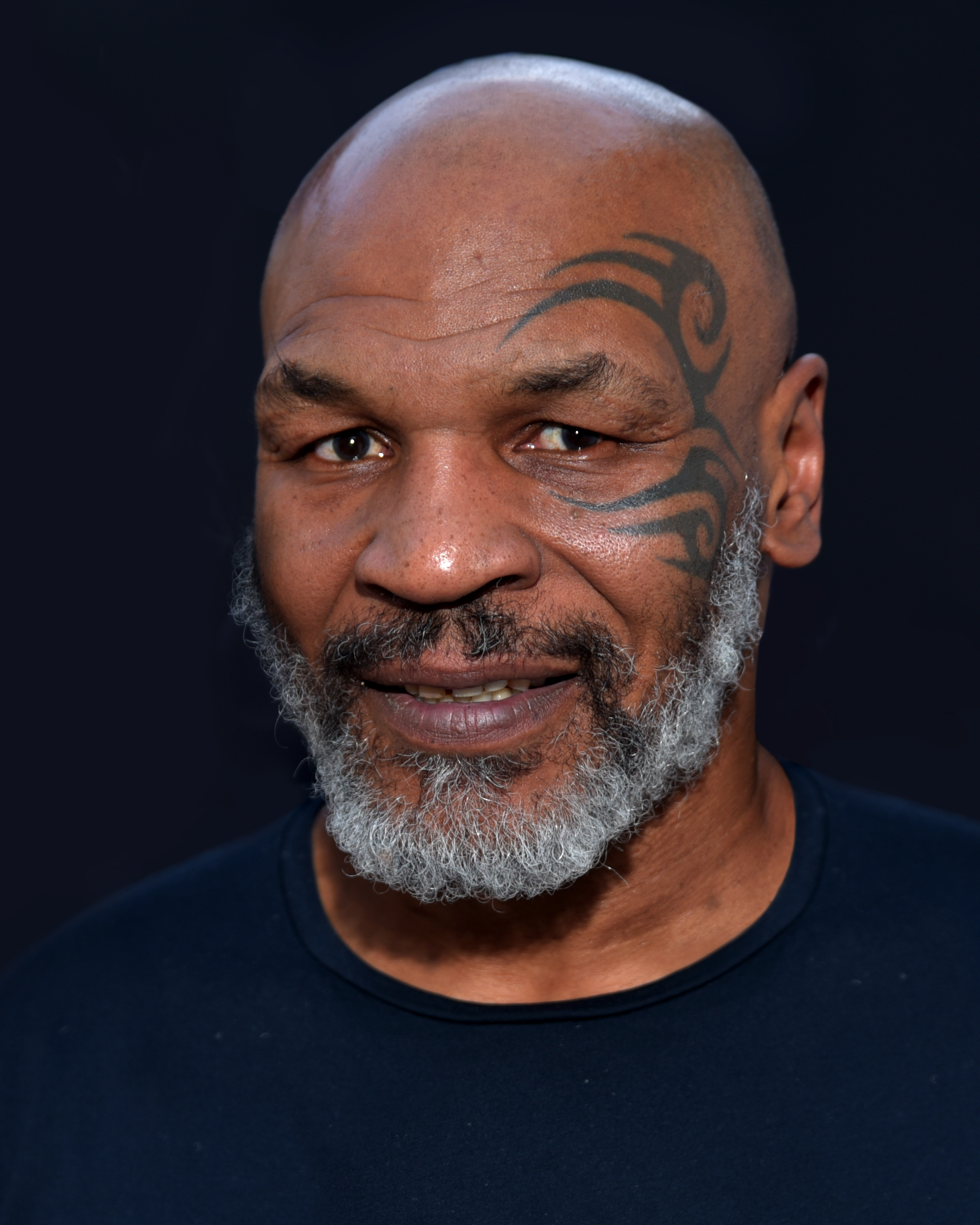
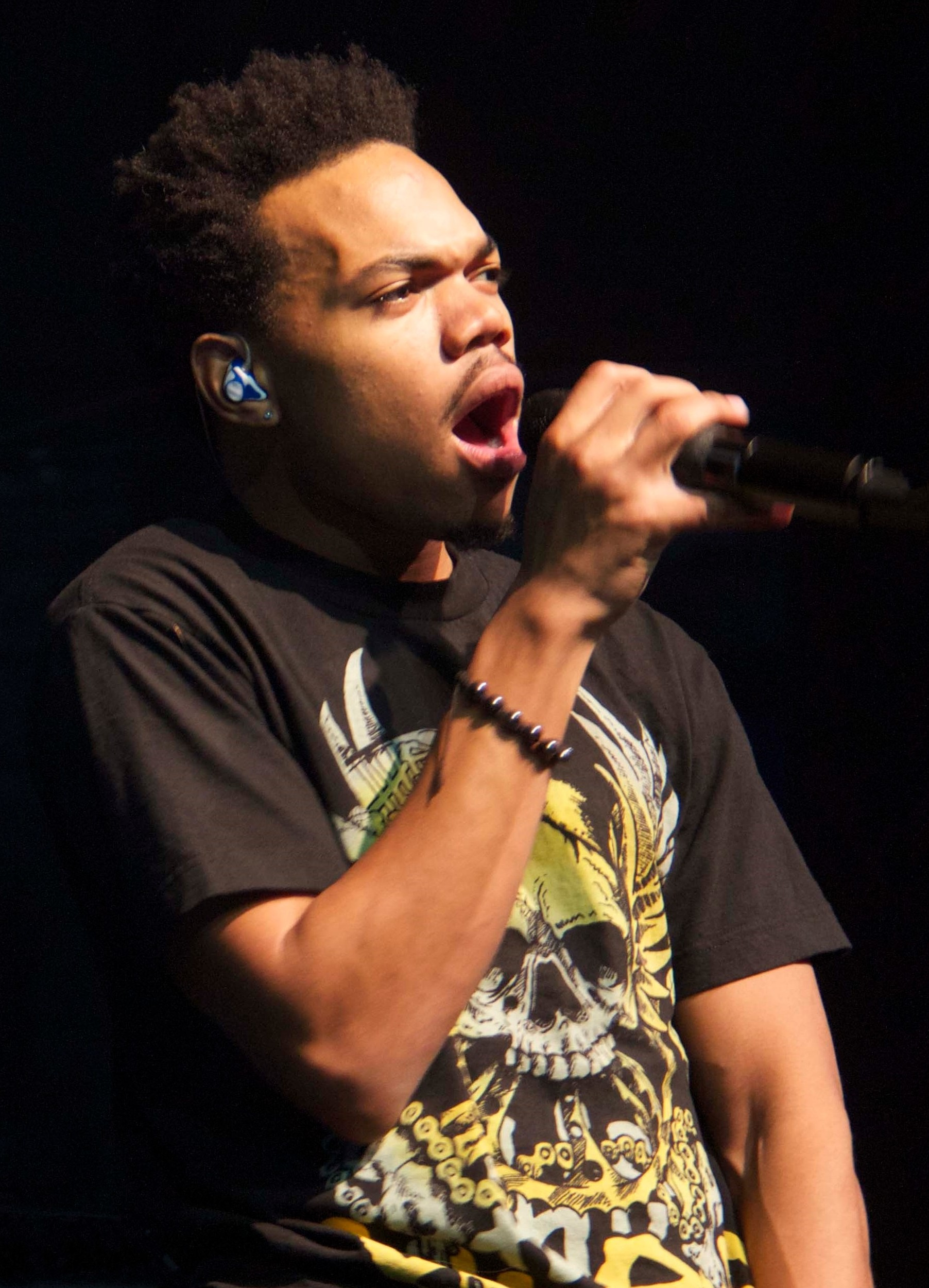
"Iconic" features a speech by Mike Tyson (left) and a rap by Chance the Rapper (right).

During the recording process of Rebel Heart, Madonna enlisted several collaborators, including MoZella, Symbolyc One and Toby Gad. Madonna posted a photograph of the trio working with her in a recording studio on her Instagram account. She said on the photograph, "Having an Iconic Moment in the studio with Toby-Mozilla and S1. My throat hurts from singing, laughing and crying." Gad worked with Madonna on fourteen songs, twelve appeared on the album's multiple track lists, with one being "Iconic". According to Gad, "The first week she was quite intimidating. It was like a test phase. You have to criticize, but you can't really offend. But she also likes honest, harsh critics to say things as they are. It worked out really well and she got sweeter and sweeter." For the track, she initially asked American rapper Jay Z to be featured on with verses about icons, however he called American rapper Chance the Rapper and said that it would be better if somebody that was a new person and that he thought that could be a new icon got on the record. Chance and Madonna had met before through American recording artist Frank Ocean in a concert and became friends, prompting the singer to accept Jay Z's suggestion.

Madonna also enlisted American professional boxer Mike Tyson to give a speech that would be used on the track. According to the singer, "I was thinking: who is in my eyes super iconic, who do I look up to, who is alive today that's been through what I feel like I've been through, that's been through a lot, survived, has stories to tell, has evolved as human being [...] is a survivor, his name came to mind right away." She also revealed that she was moved and impressed after seen his HBO-documentary "Mike Tyson: Undisputed Truth", directed by Spike Lee and contacted him. Tyson revealed that he ad-libbed his part of the song in one take and was inspired by Benito Mussolini, who Tyson admitted that was seen as arrogant, but he tried to come from a positive perspective and be uplifting. In an interview for Rolling Stone he explained: "I didn't know what the hell I was going there for. I'm just there having a good time and hanging out with Madonna. She has her producer there and I go into the studio and I didn't know if she wanted me to talk or rap. I just go in there and start talking. I'm talking about my life and things that I have endured. I'm saying some really crazy stuff. It was really intense."

In December 2014, thirteen unfinished demos of tracks for the album, including "Iconic", were leaked to the Internet. The leaked material included artwork suggesting the album was to be titled Iconic as well. The leaked version didn't feature either Chance the Rapper or Mike Tyson. In the same day, Madonna expressed her dissatisfaction with the leaked material, claiming it was an artistic rape and a form of terrorism. To avoid further leaks, Madonna released six completed tracks with the pre-order for the album on the iTunes Store on December 20, 2014, as an "early Christmas gift". On January 22, 2015, an updated version of the previously-leaked demo version surfaced online, with Chance and Tyson. On February 9, 2015, the singer released three other finished tracks, including the final version of "Iconic", as well as the album's track list.

== Composition and lyrics ==
"Iconic" was written by Madonna, Toby Gad, Maureen McDonald, Larry Griffin Jr., Chancelor Bennett, Dacoury Natche and Michael Tucker. It was produced by Madonna, Gad, Afsheen and Josh Cumbee, while DJ Dahi and Tucker served as additional producers. It features Chance the Rapper and Mike Tyson. Gad, Afsheen and Cumbee were also responsible for programming and the song's instruments, with Gad also providing background vocals. The track was engineered and mixed by Demacio "Demo" Castellon with Gad and Angie Teo. It is an EDM, hip hop and dance-pop with trap influences, that starts with a "crowd cheering" and "rapturous applause" as Tyson opens the song with "a boastful spoken word segment". Later, the verses build up, with the hook having "a stomping rhythm to be sung 'en masse', with a high euphoric melody like a precocious, pre-recession club classic", as The Quietus' Amy Pettifer described. As she added, "the sonically sparse verse breaks down" with the song featuring "machinic stabs" and "grinding electronic gears." Its pre-chorus "drops into stabs of ice-cold synths," with other instrumentation consisting in "marching drums and booming bass." Its "weird" beat was described by Sam C. Mac of Slant Magazine as "Kanye and Jay-Z's 'H•A•M' arm-wrestling Skrillex."

Lyrically, "Iconic" talks about taking control of your life and letting your inner fire burn and encourages listeners to pursue their dreams. During the song, she urges the listeners to "making [their] voices heard before someone does it for [them]" with her voice "echoing like the announcer in the ring." In another part, during the motivational encouragement, she informs that "there's only two letters difference between 'I Can't' and 'Icon'," while also inspiring the listeners to find their own greatness, singing: "Just shine your light like a beautiful star / Show the world who you are." Tyson opening speech talks about how he's ‘the best the world's ever seen' and that he "worked hard and sweated [his] tears." He later proclaims: "I'm never falling again and if I did, I'll come back." Chance, on the other hand, raps about idolatry.

== Critical reception ==
"Iconic" received favorable reviews from most music critics. Randall Roberts of the Los Angeles Times noted that the song is driving by "focus", which puts it "into that sweet spot between club frenzy and revelatory lyricism, the kind that can lift spirits to emotional heights." Neil McCormick of The Daily Telegraph described it as a song that "reflect[s] a contemporary trend for fast, furious and funny mash ups of conflicting ideas, constantly teetering on the edge of collapse but pulling out another beat or hook to keep things moving." In a similar mode, Kyler Anderson of Entertainment Weekly confessed that he thought the song would be his "most-skipped track", but admitted that he "kind of admire its barely-conscious chaos." James Grebey of Spin dismissed Tyson's inclusion, however he praised the song for having a statement that is the album's lynchpin and that "[w]ith its robotic, authoritarian droning, 'Iconic' conveys the point that — love her or hate her — Madonna is an icon, and you’re not getting rid of her anytime soon." John Marrs of Gay Times gave the track four out of five stars, claiming that "the finished product is wholly different from the demo and much more gutsy, getting better with every play." Lewis Corner of Digital Spy defined it as "a club-ready dash of trap-pop" and selected the song as one of the "tracks to download". Nick Levine of Time Out agreed, writing that "the sassy stuff is excellent, especially the catchy, trap-tinged 'Iconic'."

Sam C. Mac of Slant Magazine noted that the song has the album's "toughest, weirdest beat, not to mention a show-stopping Chance the Rapper verse and a pretty disarming message from the singer herself." He was unsure if Madonna meant to "embrace her iconic status or fight her way out from under its oppressive expectations" during the track, but praised the discontent and uncommon message for making the album her "most committed work since 2003's underrated 'American Life'." Bradley Stern of MuuMuse was positive, saying that the result is "a confidence-boosting compliment to a grueling gym workout." He continued: "The ominous beat drops are certainly more ‘on-trend’ than, say, 'Hold Tight,' but the song still feels (mostly) fresh and strange, as opposed to the late-to-the-party dubstep/EDM excursion on 'MDNA'. [...] It's a thrilling, weird and semi-embarrassing-yet-ultimately-empowering centerpiece of Rebel Heart that feels as bold as a song called 'Iconic' by Madonna should." Joe Lynch of Billboard called the collaboration "just about as odd as you'd expect", but labeled it "a fairly overwrought affair. Chance's verse is fire, but the intense, busy production ultimately adds up to very little." Michelle Geslani of Consequence of Sound pointed out that "as odd as the circumstances might be, the track surprisingly gels together far more smoothly than one would expect." Ben Kelly of Attitude named it "her own ‘bow down bitches’ moment." while Ludovic Hunter-Tilney of Financial Times said that the song is "wonderfully unhinged."

In a mixed analysis, Amy Pettifer of The Quietus called it "a Ted-talk of well-worn, motivational encouragement cloaked in a club anthem." Saaed Saaed of The National called the album's "mini slump," while Jonh Murphy of musicOMH noted that the song "falls rather flat." Annie Zaleski of The A.V. Club was confused with the song's message, saying that it "can’t decide if it wants to skewer fame or encourage people to embrace it." Lydia Jenkins wrote for The New Zealand Herald that the song "could definitely be accused of trying to emulate the success of Katy Perry's 'Dark Horse." Lauren Murphy of The Irish Times dismissed Tyson's appearance, declaring that his spoken word turn on 'Iconic' is tokenistic." Sasha Geffen of Consequence of Sound criticized the song's "lazy rhymes", which according to herself, lumps into "an awkward hybrid of EDM and hip-hop featuring one of hip-hop's finest [that] sounds out of place here amid the bass drops and robot vocals."

== Commercial performance ==
Upon its release, although the song was not released as a single, it ended up charting worldwide. In Finland, the song charted at number 30 on Latauslista's Finland Download chart. It also charted at number 30 on the Productores de Música de España's (PROMUSICAE) Spanish Sales Chart. In France, the song charted at number 114 on SNEP's France Singles Chart. In Hong Kong, the song charted at number 13, according to the Hong Kong Recording Industry Alliance (HKRIA), its highest peak on any chart it made. In Hungary, the song charted at number 39 on their Single Top 40 chart. In Italy, the song charted at number 40 on Musica e dischi's Italian Singles Chart. In Sweden, the song charted at number 56 on DigiListan's Sweden Download chart.

== Live performances ==
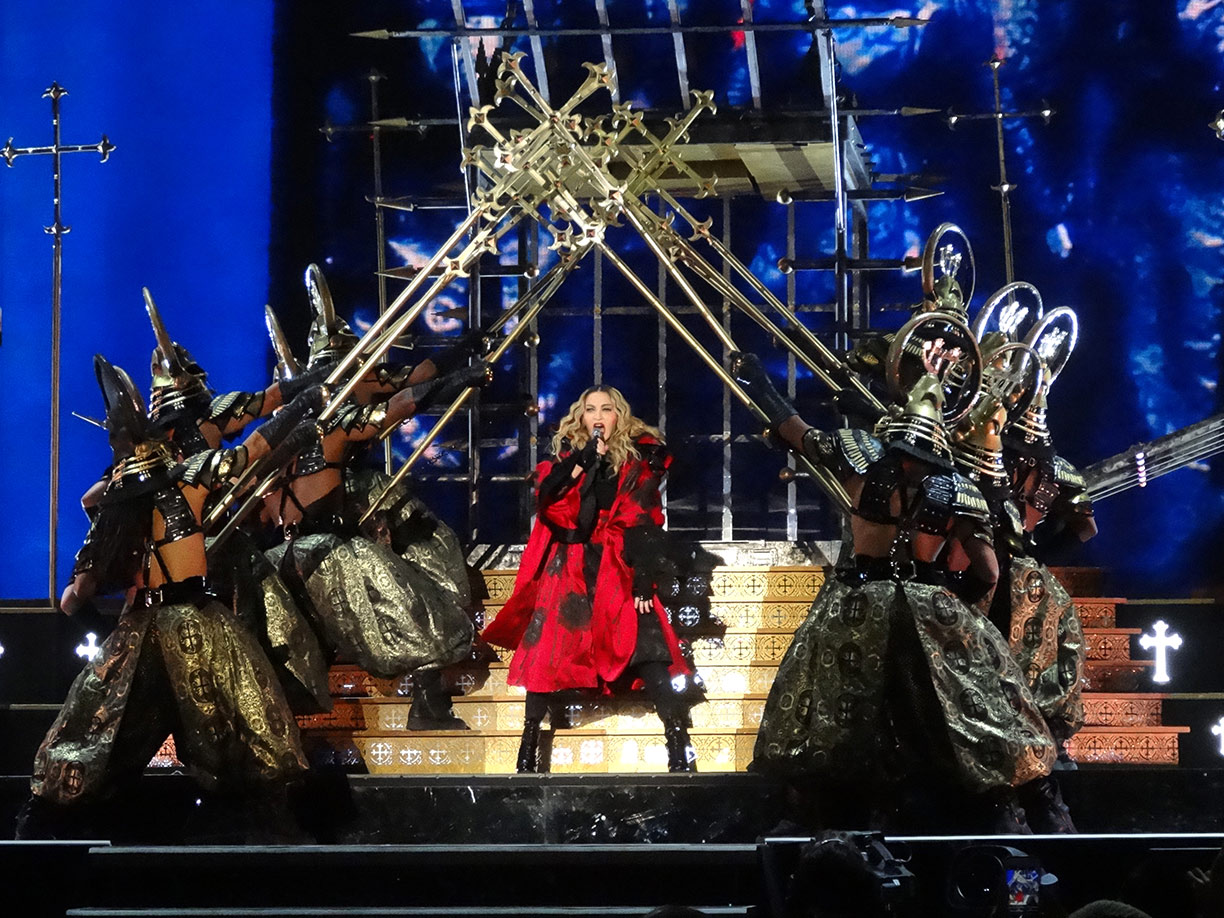
Madonna and her dancers opening the Rebel Heart Tour (2015–16) with a performance of "Iconic"

"Iconic" was chosen to be the opening song from the Rebel Heart Tour (2015–16). It begins with a video featuring Madonna in a glamorous dress cavorting with bare-bodied males juxtaposed with Mike Tyson talking inside of a cage. Tyson commented about the shooting, saying: "Riveting is not [the word]. It's just intense... I'm in a cage. I'm a hostage. I'm chained. I'm naked. I look like a savage. When I [shot] it, it didn't seem that intense. But then you watch it and go, 'Whoa'. It was like [something out of] National Geographic. I need to be tamed, man." Madonna performed wearing an "ornate kimono-like robe with wide sequin-lined sleeves" inside a medieval-looking cage surrounded by religious iconography that she later breaks out of as she sings the first lines, while guards dressed similar to the ones who guarded the Wicked Witch of the West's castle marched onstage. During the performance, she also hung upside down on a cross.

The performance was received with a positive response from critics. Jordan Zivitz of Montreal Gazette called the performance "insanely theatrical, Broadway-worthy." Melissa Maerz wrote for Entertainment Weekly that "As visually spectacular as it was narratively [sic] heavy-handed, it felt like a callback to her last tour, 'MDNA', which featured a dark charade that found Madonna wielding a gun on stage. But when the song ended with video footage of the gladiators knocking over a saintly-looking Madonna statue, the tone changed. Madonna has built a career by playing with what we hold sacred, whether it's crucifixes or underground dance crazes. Now the only sacred thing she's tearing down is Madonna herself." The performance of the song at the March 19–20, 2016 shows in Sydney's Allphones Arena was recorded and released in Madonna's fifth live album, Rebel Heart Tour.

== Credits and personnel ==
=== Management ===
- Webo Girl Publishing, Inc. (ASCAP)/Atlas Music Publishing and Gadfly Songs (ASCAP)/EMI April Music, Inc. and Mo Zella Mo Music (ASCAP)/WB Music Corp.
- Roc Nation Music and Vohndee's Soul Music Publishing WB Music Corp. (ASCAP)//Chancelor Bennett (BMI) c/o Davis, Shapiro, Lewitt, Grabel, Leven, Granderson & Blake/Sony/ATV Sonata and Dahi Productions (SESAC).
- Michael Tucker Music (ASCAP) c/o Kobalt Songs Music Publishing, These Are Songs of Pulse (ASCAP) and OWSLA Trax (ASCAP) c/o Kobalt Songs Music Publishing.

=== Personnel ===
- Madonna – vocals, songwriter, record producer
- Maureen McDonald – songwriter
- Toby Gad – songwriter, producer, programming, instruments, audio mixer, backing vocals
- Larry Griffin Jr. – songwriter
- DJ Dahi – songwriter, additional producer
- Michael "Diamonds" Tucker – songwriter, additional producer
- Chance the Rapper – songwriter, vocals
- Mike Tyson – speech
- Afsheen – producer, programming, instruments
- Josh Cumbee – producer, programming, instruments
- Dan Warner – guitar
- Demacio "Demo" Castellon – engineer, audio mixer
- Angie Teo – additional recording and mixing

Credits adapted from Madonna's official website.

== Charts ==
Chart (2015)	Peak position
Finland Download (Latauslista)	30
France (SNEP)	114
Hong Kong (HKRIA)	13
Hungary (Single Top 40)	39
Italy (Musica e dischi)	40
Spain Singles Sales (PROMUSICAE)	30
Sweden Download (DigiListan)	56
