= Unapologetic Bitch =

2014 song performed by Madonna

Song by Madonna

from the album Rebel Heart
- Released: December 20, 2014
- Recorded: 2014
- Genre: Reggae pop
- Length: 3:50
- Label: Interscope
- Songwriters: Madonna Ciccone; Thomas Wesley Pentz; Maureen McDonald; Tobias Gad; Shelco Garcia; Bryan Orellana
- Producers: Madonna; Shelco Garcia & Teenwolf; BV; Diplo; Ariel Rechtshaid

Rebel Heart track listing
- 24 tracks: 1. "Living for Love"; 2. "Devil Pray"; 3. "Ghosttown"; 4. "Unapologetic Bitch"; 5. "Illuminati"; 6. "Bitch I'm Madonna"; 7. "Hold Tight"; 8. "Joan of Arc"; 9. "Iconic"; 10. "HeartBreakCity"; 11. "Body Shop"; 12. "Holy Water"; 13. "Inside Out"; 14. "Wash All Over Me"; Deluxe edition: 15. "Best Night"; 16. "Veni Vidi Vici"; 17. "S.E.X."; 18. "Messiah"; 19. "Rebel Heart"; Media Markt deluxe edition: 20. "Auto-Tune Baby"; Super deluxe edition (Disc 2): 1. "Beautiful Scars"; 2. "Borrowed Time"; 3. "Addicted"; 4. "Graffiti Heart"

Licensed audio
- "Madonna - Unapologetic Bitch (Official Audio)" on YouTube

"Unapologetic Bitch" is a song recorded by American singer and songwriter Madonna for her thirteenth studio album, Rebel Heart (2015). It was written by Madonna, Thomas Wesley Pentz, Shelco Garcia, Bryan Orellana, Maureen McDonald and Toby Gad, with production being done by Madonna, Garcia & Teenwolf, BV, Diplo and Ariel Rechtshaid. The song's demo was leaked to the internet in December 2014, with twelve other tracks from the album. Its final version was released on December 20, 2014, with five other tracks on the iTunes store, as "an early Christmas gift" to avoid more leakage. The song was conceived while Madonna was in the studio with Diplo, who worked with the singer on more than eight songs for the album.

"Unapologetic Bitch" is a reggae pop song, with a dancehall groove, air horns, military drum beats and dub sirens in its instrumentation. The song is reminiscent of Diplo's original sound, having dancehall elements. Lyrically, the song talks about overcoming a bad breakup and rediscovering one's inner strength. The song received generally positive response from critics, who agreed it was a fun, refreshing track, while noting it resembles the work of other artists produced by Diplo, such as M.I.A., Santigold, as well as his own group, Major Lazer. It charted in some European territories, as well as on the Billboard Dance/Electronic Songs chart. The song was part of Madonna's Rebel Heart Tour (2015–16), with the singer inviting a member of the audience to participate during the performance, rewarding them with a banana as a gift afterwards.

== Background and release ==
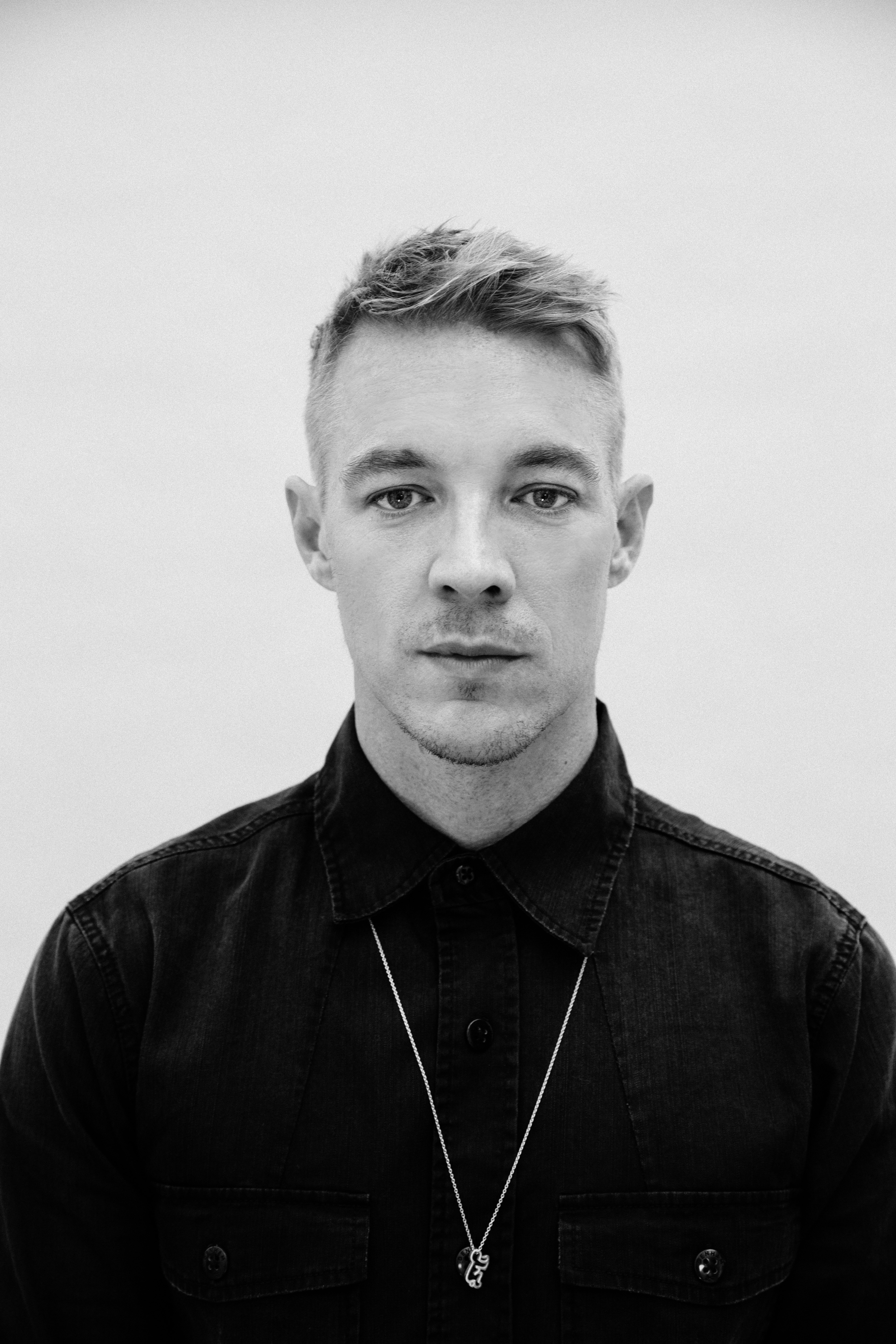
Diplo co-wrote and co-produced the song.

While recording for her thirteenth studio album, Madonna enlisted American DJ and producer Diplo to work with her on some songs. In May 2014, she posted three photos on her Instagram account, which revealed she was working the producer. She called him "a slave driver" in the studio. Diplo commented that he met Madonna because of her kids and then she invited him to a party, and they ended up writing seven songs together. He continued: "I do not usually feel pressured to write hits, but when it's an artist of this cailber, it's obvious that I want to push the bounderies [sic] a little bit further and surpass myself." He claimed she was "up for anything" and that he "love[s] when an artist gives a producer the confidence he needs to work with them, and Madonna was very open-minded to my ideas... she was down from day one." He added:

"I've done about three weeks with her, and we’re gonna do some more projects at the end of July. She's just really cool. I think as far as artists reinventing themselves, she did it before anybody else. She kind of began that trend of actually coming back with a whole new look and style and sound and winning it and hitting the top of the charts. Those records are gonna be crazy-sounding. We really pushed the envelope with some of the stuff we were doing."

In December 2014, some reports suggested that the album was set to be named Unapologetic Bitch, since it was the title of one of the thirteen track demos that leaked to the Internet in December 2014, as well as the hashtag that she used frequently on Instagram while working on the album. However, she later confirmed the album to be titled Rebel Heart, while releasing six completed tracks as pre-order for the album on iTunes Store, on December 20, 2014, as an "early Christmas gift" to avoid more material being leaked. "Unapologetic Bitch" was among the six tracks and it was revealed that Diplo produced it.

== Composition and lyrics ==
"Unapologetic Bitch" was written by Madonna, Diplo, Shelco Garcia, Bryan Orellana, Maureen McDonald and Toby Gad, with production being completed by Madonna, Garcia & Teenwolf, DV, Diplo and Ariel Rechtshaid. Diplo, Garcia & Teenwolf were the song's musicians, Demacio "Demo" Castellon and Nick Rowe were the song's engineers, with Castellon also serving as the song's mixer, Gad contributed to additional programming and Angie Teo to additional mixing. It is a reggae pop song, with a dancehall groove, having air horns and military drum beats, with the song "morphing slide guitar into lasers" and "squalling dub sirens" during its bridge. Bernard Zuel from The Sydney Morning Herald added that Madonna's voice is "tweaked at times to sound cartoonish amid Jamaican off-beat guitars and squawky synthesiser noise."

Lyrically, "Unapologetic Bitch" talks about a scorned lover rediscovering their inner strength, with Madonna "shooting a few poison arrows into the heart of some dude who's done her wrong", as noted by Rolling Stone's Rob Sheffield. During the song, she repeatedly labels an ex's bad behavior as "bullshit" and tells him, "fuck you". In another part, she mocks, "When we did it, I'll admit it, wasn't satisfied." In the chorus, she sings: "It might sound like I’m an unapologetic bitch / but sometimes you know I gotta call I like it is." The song was allegedly written about Madonna's ex-boyfriend Brahim Zaibat. She told Rolling Stone that the song "it's like, fuck you, I'm going to have fun. You think you're going to ruin my life and you think that it's over for me, but guess what? It's not. Life goes on." While commenting to Billboard over the usage of the word "bitch" numerous times in two songs from the album, Madonna explained:

I think that's bullshit. The word police can fuck off. I don't want to be policed! I'm not interested in political correctness. The word "bitch" means a lot of different things. Everything is about context. When I first moved to England and heard the word "cunt", I was horrified. People were calling each other cunts! And then I realized that, in that culture, it was different—they slapped each other on the back and said, "Who's the cunt, right, you're my best mate!" The word "fuck" doesn't just mean sexual intercourse. I mean, "You're a stupid fuck", "Are you going to fuck with me?" "Fuck off!"... Sex has nothing to do with any of those expressions, and the same goes for "bitch". If I say to you, "I'm a badass bitch", I'm owning myself, I'm saying, "I'm strong, I'm tough, and don't mess with me." If I say, "Why are you being such a bitch to me?", well, that means something else.

== Critical reception ==
The song received generally favorable reviews from music critics. While analyzing "Unapologetic Bitch" and "Bitch I'm Madonna", Stephen Thomas Erlewine of AllMusic wrote that "their titles suggesting vulgarity, their execution flinty and knowing", and also picked "Unapologetic Bitch" as one of the album's highlights. Kitty Empire of The Guardian noted that the songs on Rebel Heart with the word "bitch" in the title "bode well", expressing that "Unapologetic Bitch" is even better than "Bitch I'm Madonna", where "Diplo lays Madonna down over some dancehall. Santigold was doing similar things in ’08, but the method remains sound." Annie Zaleski of The A.V. Club also noticed that it "resembles watered-down Santigold." Amy Pettifer of The Quietus applauded the line, "you never really knew how much you loved me till you lost me", calling it "the killer nugget of this track", which she labelled "[w]icked good," while Time's Jamieson Cox thought that it was "fun to hear Madonna deliver a line like, 'It might sound like I’m an unapologetic bitch / but sometimes you know I gotta call I like it is' because she has three’ decades worth of unapologetic bitchiness in her back pocket. It's an easy score, sure, but it's effective." Lewis Corner of Digital Spy called it "brilliant", while Lee DeVito of Metro Times called it "one of the more enjoyable tracks" on the album.

Rob Sheffield of Rolling Stone called the song "the standout" among the first six tracks on the album, calling it "a breakup rant over a Diplo-produced dancehall groove", noting that "Madonna writing herself a theme song called 'Unapologetic Bitch' is like Springsteen doing one called 'Jersey Guy Who Sweats a Lot'." Caryn Ganz of the same publication named it a "refreshing, reggae-tinged [track]." Saeed Saeed of The National labelled it "a peppy reggae track, [where] Madonna gives h[er e-x] a smackdown", comparing it to Diplo's former work with Sri Lankan artist and former Madonna collaborator M.I.A. Evan Sawdey of PopMatters called it "defiant", but informed that it "strikes more than a few poses copied from the Gwen Stefani playbook." Gavin Haynes of NME opined that the song "could've fallen off the back of a Major Lazer album." While calling it "interesting", Lydia Jenkin of The New Zealand Herald criticized Madonna's voice, which according to her, "sounds out of place, and overly thin in the context of the track." In other hand, Spin's Andrew Unterberger provided a very positive note about the song, claiming:

"'Unapologetic Bitch' is about as successful and seamless a rebranding as Madge could ask for in the year 2015. Co-written and produced by Diplo, a man prone to the occasional bout of unapologetic bitchiness himself, the reggae-tinged banger is as snarlingly exhilarating as 'Human Nature' was 20 years ago, but now Madonna is done with even feigning shock at being told what not to talk about, instead casually proffering, 'I gotta call it like it is.'"

Jon Pareles from The New York Times, included "Unapologetic Bitch" among the best songs of 2015.

== Live performance ==
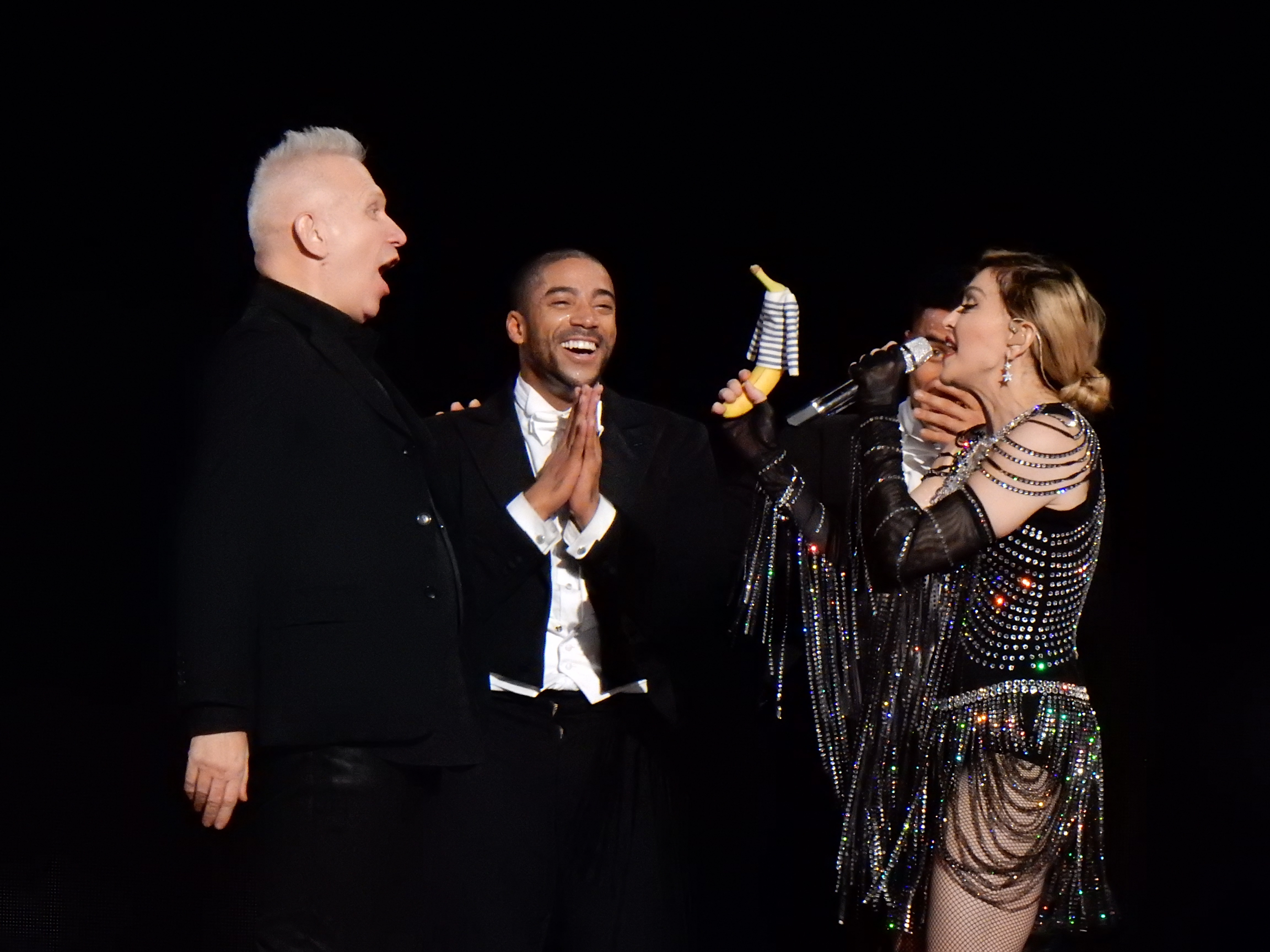
During the performance of "Unapologetic Bitch" on the Rebel Heart Tour, Madonna would invite a member of the audience onstage and give them a banana as prize. In the image, the singer and designer Jean Paul Gaultier.

Madonna performed "Unapologetic Bitch" on her Rebel Heart Tour (2015–16). The song was the penultimate track on the tour setlist, before the show's encore, "Holiday". For the performance, Madonna invited a member of the audience to join her during the song, and while dancing with them and playfully spanking the guest, she finished the performance giving a banana as a "gift". The first guest during the opening night in Montreal, Quebec, Canada was the song's producer Diplo. The singer turned him around and simulated insertion of the fruit, while saying: "There's so many things you can do with a banana." Other celebrities given bananas by Madonna during the performance of "Unapologetic Bitch" included Idris Elba, Rita Ora, Ariana Grande, Amy Schumer, Nelly Furtado, Anderson Cooper, Graham Norton and Katy Perry, who was called the "Best Unapologetic Bitch Ever" by Madonna.

Jon Pareles of The New York Times called the performance "jibe, but a more celebratory one," while Lindsay Zoladz of Vulture named it "a crowd-pleaser". Writing for The Daily Telegraph, Neil McCormick praised the fact that the singer "sound[ed] spontaneous and unscripted and her pleasure in performing is undeniable and infectious", noticing that "[s]he delighted the London audience [...] for an absurdly improvised funky dance that seems likely to become a YouTube meme." Reviewing the show for The Guardian, Peter Robinson called her performance "relaxed and comfortable". The performance of the song at the March 19–20, 2016 shows in Sydney's Allphones Arena were recorded and released in Madonna's fifth live album, Rebel Heart Tour.

== Credits and personnel ==
=== Management ===
- Webo Girl Publishing, Inc. (ASCAP) / Songs Music Publishing, LLC o/b/o I Like Turtles Music, Songs of SMP (ASCAP).
- Next Era Publishing (BUMA) and BMG Talpa Music (BUMA) BMG Platinum Songs (BMI)/EMI April Music, Inc.
- Mo Zella Mo Music (ASCAP)/Atlas Music Publishing and Gadfly Songs (ASCAP)

=== Personnel ===
- Madonna – vocals, songwriter, producer
- Diplo – songwriter, producer, musician
- MoZella – songwriter
- Toby Gad – songwriter
- Shelco Garcia – songwriter, producer, musician
- Bryan Orellana – songwriter
- Ariel Rechtshaid – producer, additional programming
- Teenwolf – producer, musician
- BV – producer
- Demacio "Demo" Castellon – engineer, audio mixer, recording
- Nick Rowe – engineer
- Angie Teo – additional mixing

Credits adapted from Madonna's official website.

== Charts ==
| Chart (2014–15) | Peak position |
|---|---|
| Finland Download (Latauslista) | 19 |
| France (SNEP) | 91 |
| Hungary (Single Top 40) | 18 |
| Italy (Musica e dischi) | 30 |
| Sweden (DigiListan) | 28 |
| US Hot Dance/Electronic Songs (Billboard) | 22 |
