= Joan of Arc (Madonna song) =

2015 single by Madonna

Song by Madonna

from the album Rebel Heart
- Released: February 9, 2015
- Recorded: 2014
- Genre: Pop; electro-folk
- Length: 4:01
- Label: Interscope
- Songwriters: Madonna; Toby Gad; Maureen McDonald; Larry Griffin Jr.
- Producers: Madonna; Gad; Afsheen; Josh Cumbee

Rebel Heart track listing
- 24 tracks: 1. "Living for Love"; 2. "Devil Pray"; 3. "Ghosttown"; 4. "Unapologetic Bitch"; 5. "Illuminati"; 6. "Bitch I'm Madonna"; 7. "Hold Tight"; 8. "Joan of Arc"; 9. "Iconic"; 10. "HeartBreakCity"; 11. "Body Shop"; 12. "Holy Water"; 13. "Inside Out"; 14. "Wash All Over Me"; Deluxe edition: 15. "Best Night"; 16. "Veni Vidi Vici"; 17. "S.E.X."; 18. "Messiah"; 19. "Rebel Heart"; Media Markt deluxe edition: 20. "Auto-Tune Baby"; Super deluxe edition (Disc 2): 1. "Beautiful Scars"; 2. "Borrowed Time"; 3. "Addicted"; 4. "Graffiti Heart"

Licensed audio
- "Madonna - Joan Of Arc (Official Audio)" on YouTube

"Joan of Arc" is a song recorded by American singer and songwriter Madonna from her thirteenth studio album Rebel Heart (2015). It was written by Madonna, Toby Gad, Maureen McDonald and Larry Griffin Jr., with production being done by Madonna, Gad, Afsheen and Josh Cumbee. The song's demo was leaked onto the internet on December 17, 2014, with twelve other tracks from the album. Its final version was released on February 9, 2015 with two other tracks on the iTunes store. "Joan of Arc" is the eighth track on Rebel Heart and has similarity to the demo version, but with a lift in its tempo during the chorus. It is a guitar-led pop and electro-folk ballad, with drums and guitars being added as the song's instrumentation.

Lyrically, the song uses the metaphor of Joan of Arc to explain that even strong people have fragile hearts and can break down, showing that the air of self-confidence that someone can carry through an entire life may be just a shield for insecurities. The lyrical content present on the song was compared to her compositions during her previous albums, Like a Prayer (1989) and Ray of Light (1998), especially "Drowned World/Substitute for Love" from the latter. The song received positive reviews from most music critics, who commended her raw vocals, the revelatory lyrics that matched with the album's thematic and noted it for being a highlight on the record. It charted in some European territories, peaking inside the top-twenty in Hungary and the top-forty in Spain and Sweden. Madonna performed an acoustic version of the track on The Ellen DeGeneres Show and on her 2016 concert in Melbourne, Madonna: Tears of a Clown.

== Background and release ==
During the recording process of her thirteenth studio album, Madonna enlisted several collaborators, with MoZella, Symbolyc One and Toby Gad being announced as new collaborators on the album in April 2014. Madonna posted a photograph of the trio working with her in a recording studio on her Instagram account. She said on the photograph, "Having an Iconic Moment in the studio with Toby-Mozilla and S1. My throat hurts from singing, laughing and crying." Gad worked with Madonna on fourteen songs, twelve appeared on the album's multiple track lists, with one being "Joan of Arc". According to Gad, "The first week she was quite intimidating. It was like a test phase. You have to criticize, but you can't really offend. But she also likes honest, harsh critics to say things as they are. It worked out really well and she got sweeter and sweeter." In December 2014, thirteen demos of tracks for the album, including "Joan of Arc", were leaked to the Internet. The song was described as a "gentle ballad". To avoid further leaks, Madonna released six completed tracks with the pre-order for the album on the iTunes Store on December 20, 2014, as an "early Christmas gift". On February 9, 2015, the singer released three other finished tracks, including the final version of "Joan of Arc", as well as the album's track list.

== Composition and lyrics ==
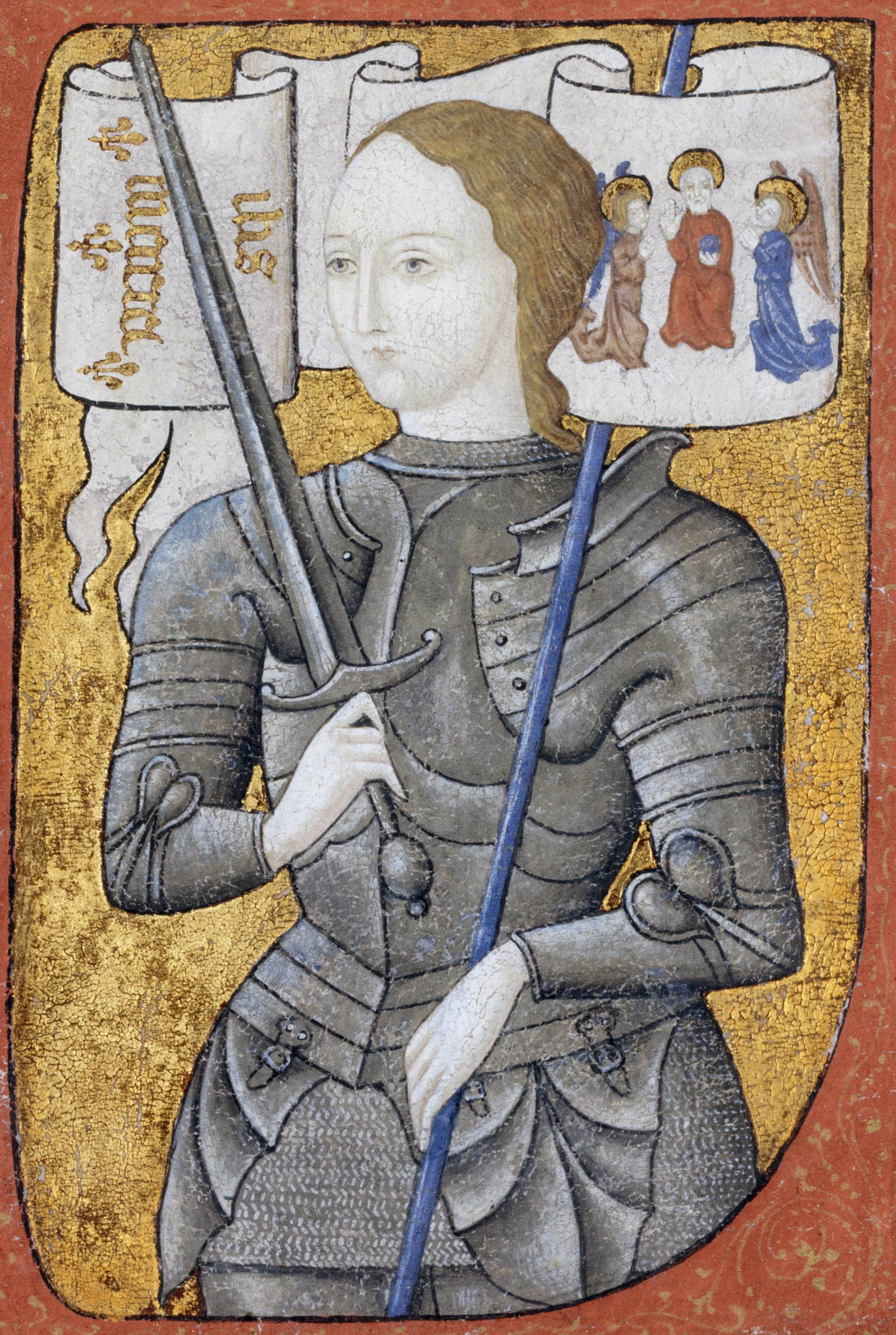
On the song, Madonna compares herself to Joan of Arc to explain that even strong people have a heart and can break down.

"Joan of Arc" was written by Madonna, Toby Gad, Mozella and Symbolyc One (S1), with production being done by Madonna, Gad, Afsheen and Josh Cumbee. Gad was also responsible for programming, additional backing vocals and the song's instruments, which were also played by Afsheen, Cumbee, Stephen Kozmeniuk, Dan Warner (guitar) and Lee Levin. The track was engineered and mixed by Demacio "Demo" Castellon with Gad and Angie Teo. "Joan of Arc" is a guitar-led pop and electro-folk ballad, which starts acoustic, similar to its demo version, but having a "new beat that lifts the BPMs considerably" in the chorus, with the added drums and guitars "turning [it] into a mid-paced radio-friendly pop [song]," but preserving the "string-laden bridge and acoustic denouement." Madonna's vocals were considered "hushed, vibrato-tinged", and "the rawest that [her] voice has sounded since 'Ray of Light' during the opening lines.

Lyrically, the confessional song talks plainly and plaintively about the detachment and loneliness that Madonna feels in the face of the press, with the singer lamenting: "Each time they write a hateful word / dragging my soul into the dirt / I wanna die." John Marrs of Gay Times compared the lyrical content of the song to Madonna's "Drowned World/Substitute For Love" (1998) explaining that the lyrics are essentially autobiographical as well as talks about how her outspokenness had led to the media trying to "hurt her". It also talks about how although Madonna is tough at heart, she still feels the "negativity" of the media. The chorus, which features skittering drums and strings, has Madonna simply saying: "I don't wanna talk about it right now / even hearts made out of steel can break down." In an interview for The New York Times, Madonna explained her admiration for Joan, her conviction as well as her commitment. She also confessed that the lyrics elaborated how the singer is still hurt by any negative words.

== Critical reception ==
The song received generally favorable reviews from music critics. Joey Lynch of Billboard compared the song's demo to the studio versions, claiming that "The studio version of 'Joan of Arc' is a massive improvement on the illegally leaked demo that preceded news of the album itself. [...] Nowhere is this more apparent than on 'Joan of Arc,' a solid album track that sounds 10 times better than the leaked version." While reviewing the three tracks released prior to the album, Sam C. Mac of Slant Magazine called it "arguably the standout of the whole over-blown affair," noting that the song "sounded like a highlight even in its more acoustic demo form, but the album version is a full-on stunner... The song sounds a bit like a Cardigans leftover circa Long Gone Before Daylight. It's the strongest (anti-)ballad of Madonna's last few albums, and a strong argument for artists responding to the denigration of their art through the more considered medium of the art itself, rather than snap public statements. [...] More than any of the previously released songs, 'Joan of Arc' also establishes one of the foundational themes of Rebel Heart, albeit one not always evident when wading through the poorly sequenced album." Adding to the previous review, Annie Zaleski of The A.V. Club praised the juxtapositions in the album's lyrical content, which according to her, "make some of her most vulnerable, engaging work in years — in particular 'Joan of Arc'."

Ben Kelly of Attitude called it "a fresh sounding pop guitar tune treading new territory for her, and which could carry serious currency as a single," while Nick Levine of Time Out labeled it "a sublime electro-folk ballad." Furthermore, Randall Roberts of Los Angeles Times considered it "the kind [of song] that can lift spirits to emotional heights." Reviewing Rebel Heart for Now, journalist Kevin Ritchie named "Joan of Arc" as one of "the most ambitious and interesting [song] lyrically." Amy Pettifer of The Quietus pointed out that "It could be a Taylor Swift song and that's a compliment." She also analysed that the Joan of Arc metaphor is "a bit of a stretch", but it's "the sweetest and catchiest song on the album thus far." Music critic Alexis Petridis wrote in The Guardian that the song is one of the "indispensable moments" on the album, "on which the singer genuinely seems to be revealing her personal feelings and frailties", saying that it is "cut from the same emotional cloth as Like a Prayer's 'Promise to Try' or Ray of Light's 'Drowned World/Substitute for Love'." John Marrs of Gay Times agreed with the Like a Prayer-style influence, noting that "[v]ocally and lyrically she could easily be channeling Eva Peron, so don’t cry for her too much."

Digital Spy's Lewis Corner reflected on the song's lyrics that "[Madonna] is still very much a sensitive soul despite a hardened public persona. [The singer] acknowledging her mortality, for some reason, feels wholly more intriguing than suggestive rhetoric that belongs with her work back in the '90s." Jamieson Cox of Time and Lauren Murphy of The Irish Times agreed that the song is one of the album's highlights. Brennan Carley of Spin thought that the song "revels convincingly in its vulnerability" where as Lindsay Zoladz of New York cited "Joan of Arc" as one of the "most affecting songs" on the album for grappling with the feeling of being defeated and fatigued directly. Bradley Stern of MuuMuse was largely positive, declaring that the song "is possibly Madonna’s best ballad since 'Miles Away'—or really since the Music or Ray of Light era." On the other hand, Consequence of Sound's Sasha Geffen had mixed feelings about the song, calling it a "lukewarm love [track that] couples easy, inoffensive melodies with historical Christian imagery." Further criticism came from Saeed Saeed of The National about the "anaemic production", while The New Zealand Herald's Lydia Jenkin called it "awfully pedestrian".

== Chart performance and live renditions ==
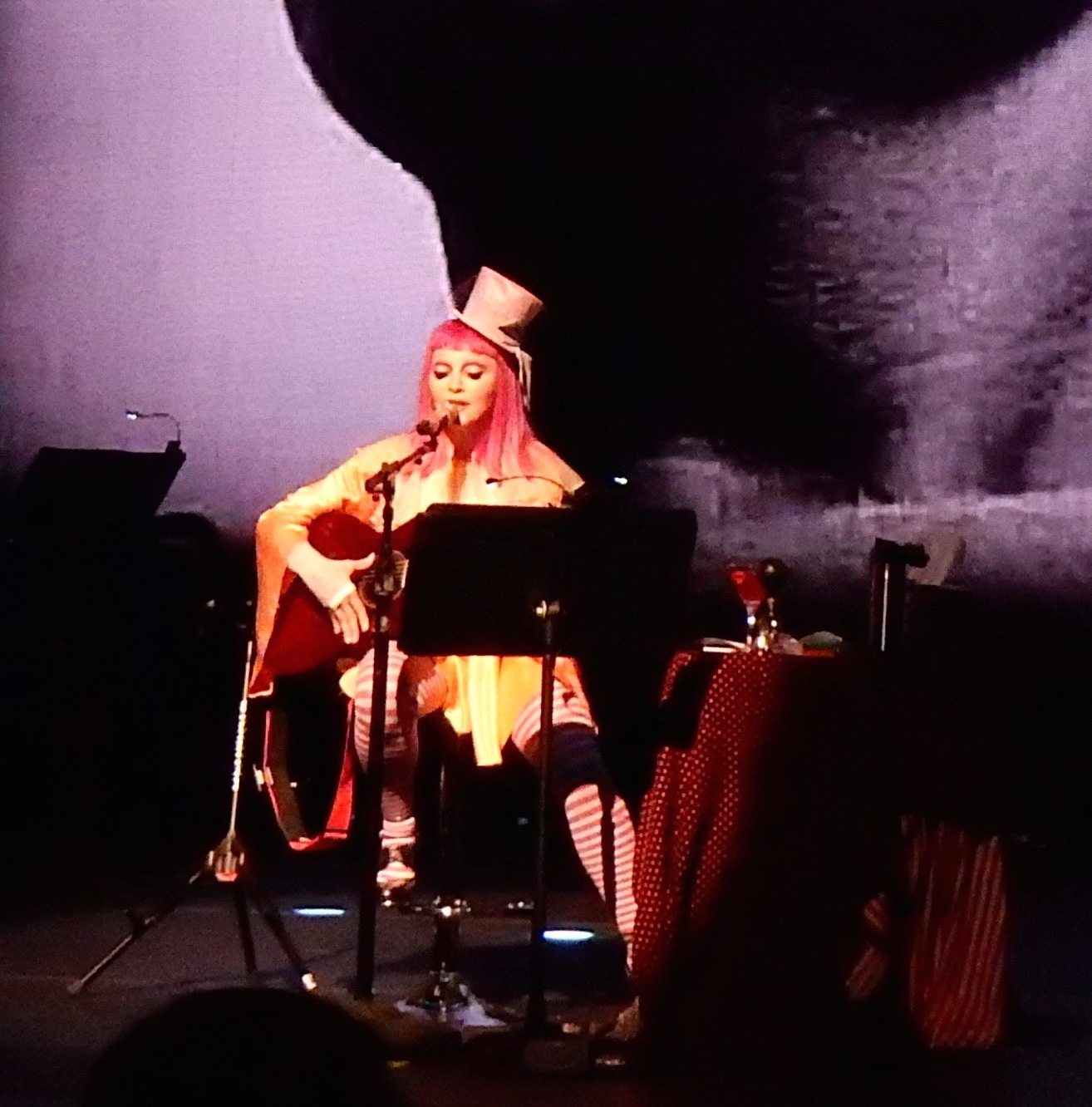
Madonna performing "Joan of Arc" as part of her special concert in Melbourne, Tears of a Clown

After "Joan of Arc" was released with "Iconic" and "Hold Tight" on February 5, 2015, the song managed to reach number twenty on the Hungarian charts, while in Spain and Sweden the song peaked inside the top-forty, reaching numbers twenty-seven and thirty-eight, respectively. In France, nine songs from Rebel Heart managed to enter the SNEP charts, with "Joan of Arc" being the second highest charting non-single from the album, managing to peak at number seventy-six, and peaking higher than the single "Bitch I'm Madonna" (which reached number 90).

Madonna performed "Joan of Arc" in an acoustic version for the first time during her week on The Ellen DeGeneres Show on March 18, 2015. Madonna was dressed in a sequined heart blouse, with the performed track being "slightly slower than the studio version, while parts of the song [had a minimal production]". Mike Wass of Idolator praised the performance, calling it "a little too good to be true — but it's nice to see Madonna showing her softer side". Digital Journal reviewer Markos Papadatos wrote that it was "an outstanding vocal performance", where Madonna "showcased tremendous control over her voice, and allows the lyrics to speak for themselves. Her delivery is emotional, vulnerable yet delicate." Writing for The Inquisitr, Daryl Deino praised her vocal performance, saying that she "showed the world once again just what her voice is made of", calling the version "beautiful". Furthermore, Bradley Stern of MuuMuse also applauded the performance, calling "[r]eally great. Super vulnerable, super emotional...and that chilly guitar finish was a wonderful surprise". Madonna also added the song to the set list of her Tears of a Clown free concert in Australia—an intimate show where the singer combined a mix of acoustic music, comedy and storytelling. It was considered a "gorgeous ballad" by Cameron Adams of News.com.au website.

== Credits and personnel ==
=== Management ===
- Webo Girl Publishing, Inc. (ASCAP)/Atlas Music Publishing and Gadfly Songs (ASCAP)/EMI April Music, Inc. and Mo Zella Mo Music (ASCAP)/WB Music Corp.
- Roc Nation Music and Vohndee's Soul Music Publishing WB Music Corp. (ASCAP).

=== Personnel ===
- Madonna – vocals, songwriter, producer
- Maureen McDonald – songwriter
- Toby Gad – songwriter, producer, programming, instruments, audio mixer
- Larry Griffin Jr. – songwriter
- Afsheen – producer, programming, instruments
- Josh Cumbee – producer, programming, instruments
- Stephen Kozmeniuk – instruments
- Lee Levin – instruments
- Dan Warner – guitar
- Demacio "Demo" Castellon – engineer, audio mixer
- Noah Goldstein – engineer, audio mixer
- Angie Teo – audio mixer, additional recording
- Ron Taylor – additional Pro Tools editing

Credits adapted from Madonna's official website.

== Charts ==
Chart (2015)	Peak position
France (SNEP)	76
Hong Kong (HKRIA)	12
Hungary (Single Top 40)	20
Italy (Musica e dischi)	30
Spain Singles Sales (PROMUSICAE)	27
Sweden (DigiListan)	38
