= Illuminati (Madonna song) =

2014 song by Madonna

Song by Madonna

from the album Rebel Heart
- Released: December 20, 2014
- Recorded: 2014
- Genre: Dance-pop; industrial; electropop; Experimental Pop
- Length: 3:43
- Label: Interscope
- Songwriters: Madonna Ciccone; Toby Gad; Maureen McDonald; Larry Griffin Jr.; Mike Dean; Kanye West; Ernest Brown; Jacques Webster
- Producers: Madonna; West; Dean; Symbolyc One; Charlie Heat (co-producer); Travis Scott (additional producer)

Rebel Heart track listing
- 24 tracks: 1. "Living for Love"; 2. "Devil Pray"; 3. "Ghosttown"; 4. "Unapologetic Bitch"; 5. "Illuminati"; 6. "Bitch I'm Madonna"; 7. "Hold Tight"; 8. "Joan of Arc"; 9. "Iconic"; 10. "HeartBreakCity"; 11. "Body Shop"; 12. "Holy Water"; 13. "Inside Out"; 14. "Wash All Over Me"; Deluxe edition: 15. "Best Night"; 16. "Veni Vidi Vici"; 17. "S.E.X."; 18. "Messiah"; 19. "Rebel Heart"; Media Markt deluxe edition: 20. "Auto-Tune Baby"; Super deluxe edition (Disc 2): 1. "Beautiful Scars"; 2. "Borrowed Time"; 3. "Addicted"; 4. "Graffiti Heart"

Licensed audio
- "Madonna - Illuminati (Official Audio)" on YouTube

"Illuminati" is a song recorded by American singer and songwriter Madonna for her thirteenth studio album Rebel Heart (2015). It was written by Madonna Ciccone, Toby Gad, Maureen McDonald, Larry Griffin Jr., Mike Dean, Kanye West, Ernest Brown and Jacques Webster. The song was produced by Madonna, West, Dean and Symbolyc One, with co-production by Charlie Heat and additional production by Travis Scott. The song's demo was leaked to the internet in December 2014, with twelve other tracks from the album. Its final version was released on December 20, 2014, with five other tracks on the iTunes Store as "an early Christmas gift" to avoid further leaks. The song's demo version features dance synths and acoustic guitars; after showing the song to West, he felt connected to the song and changed it to a darker sound. The song was conceived after Madonna was accused of being a member of the Illuminati; she wanted to write a song about who they really are and what they are not.

"Illuminati" is a dance-pop, industrial and electropop song with brittle hits, blips and a buzz-saw break as its main instrumentation. Its sound was compared to that of West's album Yeezus (2013). The song's lyrics discuss Illuminati conspiracy theories; it names celebrities who had also been accused of being part of the group, and religious imagery. Madonna sings, "It's like everybody in this party's, shining like Illuminati". The song received favorable reviews from music critics, who commended West involvement with the track, and its ambitious sound and lyrics, while some chose it as one of the album's highlights. It charted in some European territories and on the Billboard's Dance/Electronic Digital Songs. On the singer's Rebel Heart Tour (2015–16), the track was used as an interlude featuring dancers strapped to tall, flexible poles; it was considered one of the show's main highlights.

== Background and release ==
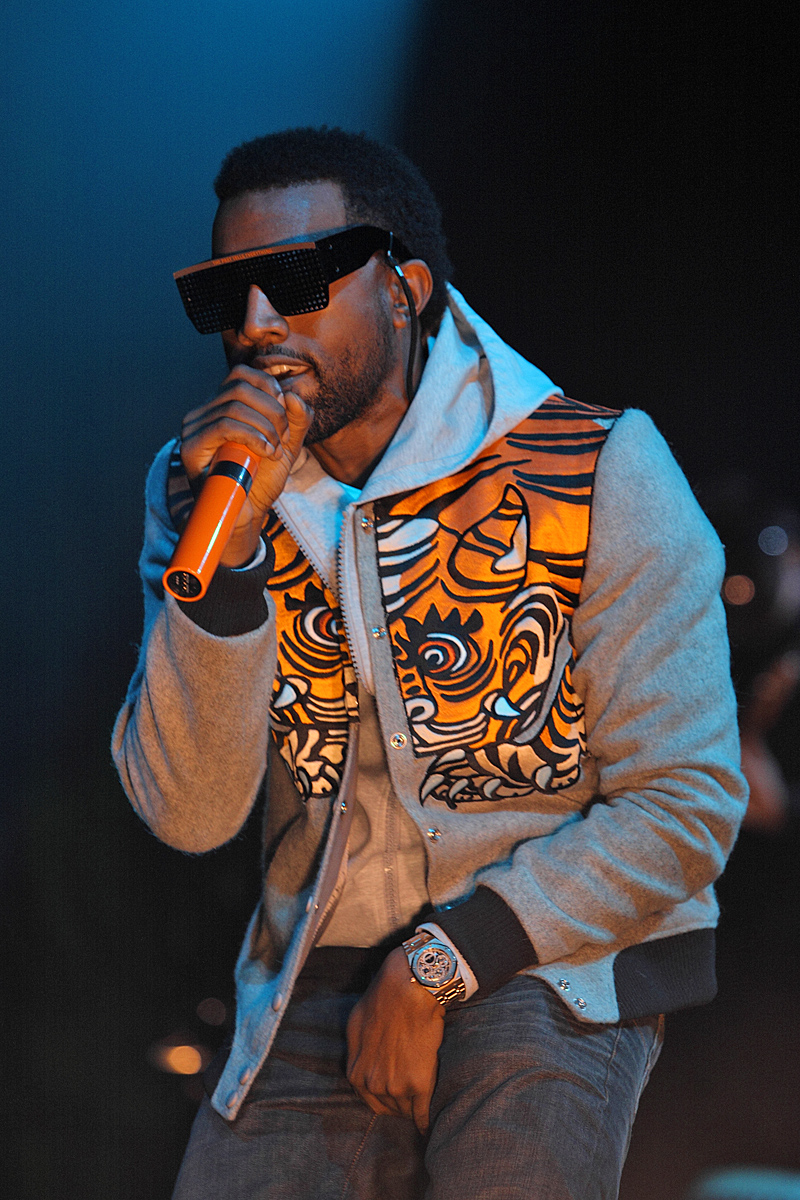
Kanye West connected with "Illuminati" and co-wrote and co-produced the track.

While recording for her thirteenth studio album, Madonna enlisted several collaborators; MoZella, Symbolyc One and Toby Gad were announced as new collaborators on the album in April 2014. Madonna posted a photograph of the trio working with her in a recording studio on her Instagram account. She said on the photograph, "Having an Iconic Moment in the studio with Toby-Mozilla and S1. My throat hurts from singing, laughing and crying." Gad worked with Madonna on fourteen songs, all of which appeared on the album. According to Gad, "The first week she was quite intimidating. It was like a test phase. You have to criticize, but you can't really offend. But she also likes honest, harsh critics to say things as they are. It worked out really well and she got sweeter and sweeter."

American recording artist Kanye West also contributed to three tracks on the album; Madonna called him "the black Madonna" and said, "We're comrades in the envelope-pushing genre". Madonna said, "It's a little bit of a bullfight, but we take turns. He knows that he's walking into a room with a person with a strong point of view, and I do, too. I listen to what he has to say, take it in, and he listens to what I say and takes it in. We didn't agree on everything, but he has good ideas." She told Rolling Stone that of the songs she played him, West connected the most with "Illuminati" and that, "[h]e loved the melody, and he was actually jumping up and down on the soundboard. He literally stood on top of the mixing board—we were worried he was going to hit his head on the ceiling, but he didn't. He ended up being very excited about that track, and then he added his spin to it, musically, and I love it. To me, he elevated the lyrics with the music. It's like a siren, alerting people." In December 2014, thirteen demos of tracks for the album, including "Illuminati", were leaked to the Internet. To avoid further leaks, Madonna released six completed tracks, including the final version of "Illuminati" with the addition of West's writing and production, with the pre-order for the album on the iTunes Store on December 20, 2014, as an "early Christmas gift".

== Composition and lyrics ==
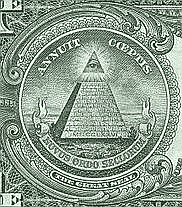
The song's lyrics are about Illuminati conspiracy theories.

"Illuminati" was written by Madonna Ciccone, Toby Gad, Maureen McDonald, Larry Griffin Jr., Mike Dean, Kanye West, Ernest Brown and Travis Scott. The song was produced by Madonna, West, Dean and Symbolyc One, with co-production by Charlie Heat and additional production by Travis Scott. Gad played guitar on the track and Dean laid keyboards and programmed the drums. The track was engineered and mixed by Demacio "Demo" Castellon and Noah Goldstein. "Illuminati" is a dance-pop, industrial and electropop song. Its demo version, written around March–April 2014, featured "staid dance synths and cheesy acoustic guitars", according to Saeed Saaed from The National. The album version features "brittle hits, blips and a buzz-saw break", which many critics considered reminiscent to West's "dark and claustrophobic sounds" of his sixth studio album Yeezus (2013).

The song's lyrics are about Illuminati conspiracy theories; Madonna sings and raps about supposed illuminati luminaries including Jay Z, Beyoncé, Kanye West, Nicki Minaj, Bill Gates, Steve Jobs, Lady Gaga, Justin Bieber, Barack Obama, LeBron James, Lil Wayne, Pope Francis, Queen Elizabeth II, Bill Clinton, Rihanna, and Oprah Winfrey. The song also mentions fashion organizations Gucci and Prada and other Illuminati symbolisms like the Golden Calf of Exodus, triangles, the Pyramids of Giza, phoenixes, pentagrams and the "Google of the United States". According to Amy Pettifer, Madonna " ... reckons it's the beautiful freaks of the club that hold the power, not these celebrity cyphers; she's interested in the sweat-slicked celestial bodies, 'shining like illuminati' ". In an interview with Rolling Stone, Madonna said she was often accused of being a member of the Illuminati and she wanted to record a song about what she believed the Illuminati to be. She said:

People are always using the word Illuminati but they're always referencing it in an incorrect way. People often accuse me of being a member of the Illuminati and I think in today's pop culture the Illuminati is perceived as a group of powerful, successful people who are working behind the scenes to control the universe. Not people with consciousness, not people who are enlightened. So people were accusing me of being a member of the Illuminati, and I kept going, wait—so first I had to figure out what that meant ... I know who the real Illuminati are, and I know where that word comes from. The real Illuminati were a group of scientists, artists, philosophers, writers, who came about in what is referred to as the Age of Enlightenment, after the Dark Ages, when there was no writing and no art and no creativity and no spirituality, and life was really at a standstill. And right after that, everything flourished. So we had people like Shakespeare and Leonardo Da Vinci and Michaelangelo and Isaac Newton, and all these great minds and great thinkers, and they were called Illuminati ... It had nothing to do with money and power. Of course they were powerful, because they influenced people. But their goal was to inspire and enlighten. So when people refer to me as a member of the Illuminati, I always want to say thank you. Thank you for putting me in that category.

== Critical reception ==
The song received generally favorable reviews from music critics. Stephen Thomas Erlewine of AllMusic called it "a sleek, spooky collaboration with Kanye West", while Caryn Ganz of Rolling Stone said the collaboration "gel[s] perfectly". Ben Kelly of Attitude said, "West's production makes a real moment" and "Her anti-Vogue rap of suspected Illuminati members is probably the only time Rihanna and Queen Elizabeth will feature side by side". Gavin Haynes of NME described it as "classy, 'Vogue'-referencing". Randall Roberts of the Los Angeles Times called it "one of the record's highlights", saying, "[s]he raps during [the song] and doesn’t sound totally ridiculous". He also said the track balances "club frenzy and revelatory lyricism". Sal Cinquemani of Slant Magazine said, "West gives 'Illuminati' the Yeezus treatment ... her rapped verses about the titular secret society are clean and tight enough to make you forget about 'American Life' ". Kevin Ritchie of Now called it one of "the most ambitious and interesting lyrically". Lindsay Zoladz of New York Daily News wrote that the song is "just goofy enough to work".

Amy Pettifer of The Quietus said the song is "scuzzy and repetitive with a danceable hook—but her voice is at its thinnest and the dynamics a little lacking. Despite all this, it does contain the great lyric, 'It's time to dance and turn this dark into something', which could be the album's epigram." Lee DeVito of Metro Times called it "a bit repetitive" but said it is probably his favorite track on the album. Saeed Saeed of The National said he favored the album's version over its demo, and that, "[t]hankfully, Kanye West rescued it by throwing out the lameness and added the dark and claustrophobic sounds of his seminal 2013 album Yeezus". Bernard Zuel from The Sydney Morning Herald said it is "colder and harder sounding, in the way of West's own recent work. There's some edge to it but not much menace that would really thrust it into compelling." For Kitty Empire of The Guardian said "Rebel Heart's key collaboration with Kanye West finds two of pop's biggest egomaniacs starring in a wiggly club banger that doubles as a take-down of the internet's most nutzoid meme". Mark Lore of Paste called it "dark and creepy, and it's one of the best tracks on Rebel Heart".

Annie Zaleski of The A.V. Club said, "while her distortion-smudged, guitar-marred Kanye West collaboration 'Illuminati' is pleasingly confrontational, the song's lyrical progression is a distracted mess ... The result? All of these shiny party people resemble the Illuminati." Jim Farber of The New York Daily News said West "gave her a dark needling rhythm that sounds like something left over from his last album. Its industrial grind clashes badly with Madonna's soft vocal." Andrew Unterberger of Spin said the song "wastes a potentially explosive, blacklit Kanye beat on a muddled, hashtagging lyric that isn’t even as conspiracy-baiting as it thinks it is". The New Zealand Herald's Lydia Jenkin was more critical, writing that it "sounds like a trying-too-hard version of Lady Gaga meets M.I.A. ". Similarly, Evan Sawdey of PopMatters said the song "reek[s] of desperation, wanting so badly to shock and offend listeners that [it] fail[s] to resolve as satisfying song first and foremost".

== Live performance ==
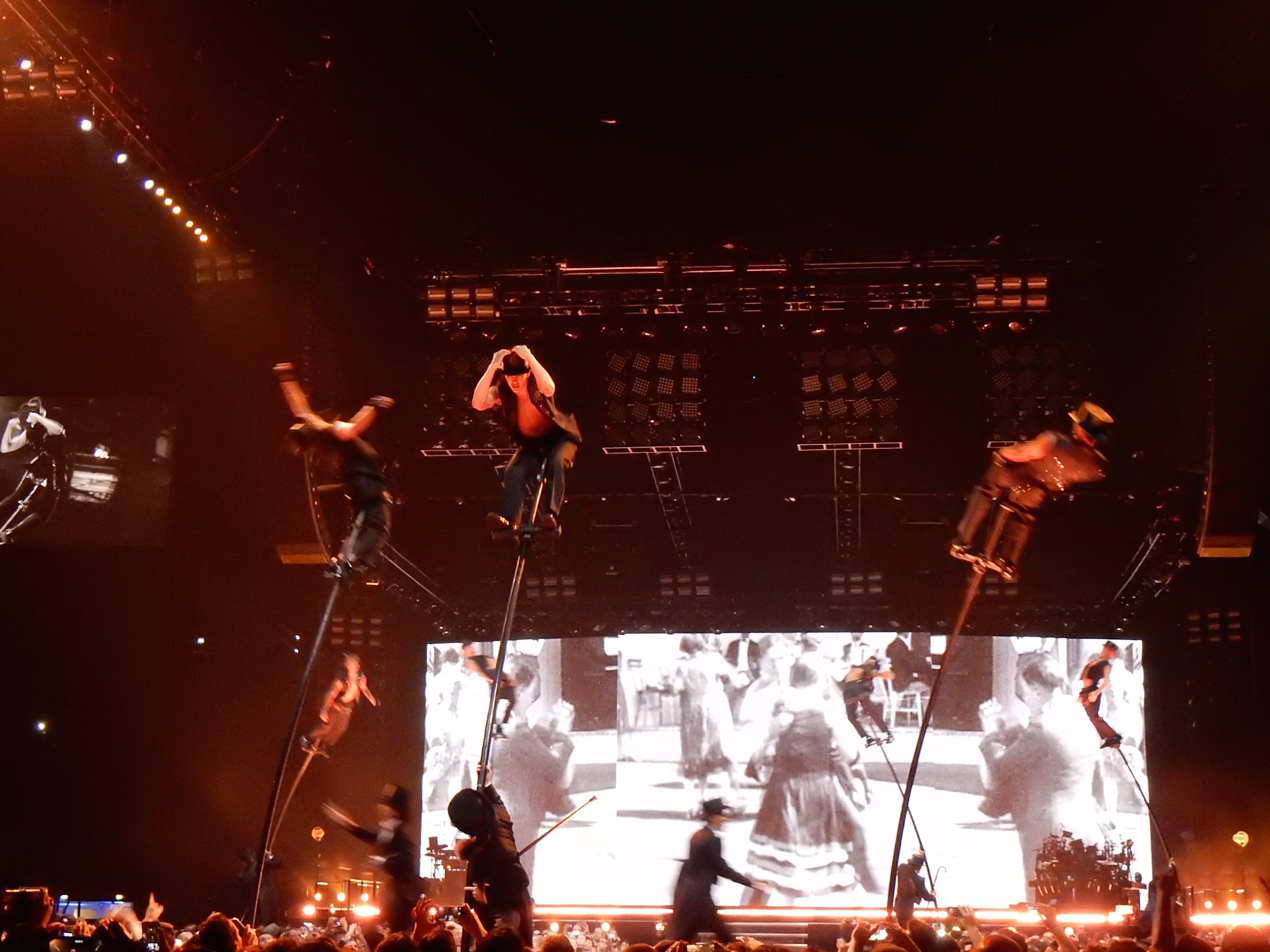
Dancers swinging on rubber poles during the "Illuminati" performance on the Rebel Heart Tour

"Illuminati" was part of the setlist of Madonna's Rebel Heart Tour (2015–16). After the acoustic performance of "Rebel Heart", Madonna leaves the stage for a costume change; her dancers perform "Illuminati" while perched on sway poles that bend with the wind. Jordan Zivitz of the Montreal Gazette praised the performance, writing that the dancers "nearly stole the show in their employer's absence during another costume change, set to Illuminati's woozy thump". George Varga of The San Diego Union Tribune said the audience "cheered with notably more enthusiasm" during the performance.

In the New York magazine review of the tour, Lindsay Zolatz commended the dancers, especially during "Illuminati", writing that it was the "most impressive" part of the show, with "some guys in top hats flying through the air on wobbly stilts that had the whole audience gasping". Kitty Empire of The Guardian said, "Madonna's interludes are as good as the main event", and that the performance of "Illuminati" "finds seven dancers strapped to the top of tall, flexible poles, swaying precipitously". The Hollywood Reporter's Ashley Lee said, "Madonna's dancers served impressive spectacles that left the crowd gasping in awe, as they leaned wildly into the audience from atop ten-foot stilts. It's arguable that her changeover dance sequences and stunts are more entertaining than other performers' entire sets." The performance at the March 19–20, 2016 shows in Sydney's Allphones Arena was recorded and released in Madonna's fifth live album, Rebel Heart Tour.

== Credits and personnel ==
- Madonna Ciccone – vocals, songwriter, producer
- MoZella – songwriter
- Toby Gad – songwriter, guitar
- Larry Griffin Jr. – songwriter, producer
- Mike Dean – songwriter, producer, keyboards, programming
- Kanye West – songwriter, producer
- Charlie Heat – songwriter, co-producer
- Travis Scott – songwriter, additional production
- Demacio "Demo" Castellon – engineer, audio mixer
- Noah Goldstein – engineer, audio mixer

Personnel adapted from Madonna's official website.

== Charts ==
Chart (2014–2015)	Peak position
Finland Download (Latauslista)	20
France (SNEP)	92
Hungary (Single Top 40)	19
Italy (Musica e dischi)	30
Sweden (DigiListan)	29
US Dance/Electronic Digital Songs (Billboard)	16
