= Sverigetopplistan =

Swedish national music chart

Sverigetopplistan (Swedish: [ˈsvæ̂rjɛˌtɔpːlɪstan], lit. "the Sweden top list") is the Swedish national record chart, based on sales data from IFPI Sverige. It was formerly known as Topplistan (1975–1997) and Hitlistan (1998–2007) and has been known by its current name since October 2007. Before Topplistan, music sales in Sweden were recorded by Kvällstoppen, whose weekly chart was a combined albums and singles list.

== History ==
For the period of 1976 to 2006, the official Swedish music charts were published by Sveriges Radio P3, a station owned by Sveriges Radio. At the end of 2006, it stopped publishing the general charts, which were entrusted to Swedish Recording Industry Association in the beginning of 2007. However, Sveriges Radio P3 continued to publish the most downloaded music charts, according to the statistics compiled by Nielsen SoundScan. The new strictly-download chart was called DigiListan.

Since 2006, the chart has included legal downloads. The charts became the first in the world to include music streaming with singles (29 October 2010) and then with albums (2013).

From 14 November 1975 to 8 September 1993 the chart was only published every 2 weeks.

The chart is published every Friday, covering sales of the previous week from Friday to Thursday.

== Charts ==
=== Album charts ===
Chart	No. of positions	Description
Albums	60	First published week 46, 1975 with 50 positions; Published starting week 46, 1995 with 60 positions
Compilation albums (Samlingar)	20	First published week 20, 1993 with 5 positions; Published starting week 40, 1995 with 10 positions; Published starting week 46, 2003 with 20 positions; Defunct; last published week 16, 2020
Physical albums	20	First published week 41, 2016
Vinyl albums	10	First published week 2, 2015
DVD albums	20	First published week 46, 2001; Defunct; last published week 16, 2020
Classical albums	10	First published week 3, 2000
Dansband/Schlager albums	20	First published week 32, 2001
Hip hop albums	20	First published week 32, 2001
Hard rock albums	20	First published week 32, 2001
Jazz albums	20	First published week 32, 2001

=== Song charts ===
Chart	No. of positions	Description
Singles	100	First published week 46, 1975 with 20 positions; Published starting week 17, 1991 with 40 positions; Published starting week 46, 1995 with 60 positions; Published starting week 2, 2015 with 100 positions
Heatseeker	20	An extension of the singles chart showing which songs are outside the top 100 and have not yet entered it.; First published week 2, 2015
Swedish Top 20 (Svenskt Topp-20)	20	First published week 2, 2015
Dance songs	20	First published week 32, 2001
Ringtones (Realtones)	20	First published week 26, 2006 with 10 positions; Published starting week 15, 2007 with 20 positions; Defunct; last published week 3, 2012

== List of number one hits ==
- List of number-one singles and albums in Sweden

== See also ==
- Tio i Topp – contemporary record chart between 1961 and 1974
- DigiListan – The Official Swedish Download Chart
