= Wash All Over Me =

2015 song by Madonna

Song by Madonna

from the album Rebel Heart
- Released: March 6, 2015
- Genre: Pop
- Length: 4:00
- Label: Interscope
- Songwriters: Madonna; Tim Bergling; Arash Pournouri; Salem Al Fakir; Magnus Lidehäll; Vincent Pontare; Mike Dean; Kanye West; Tommy Brown
- Producers: Madonna; Avicii; Dean; West; Charlie Heat (co-production)

Rebel Heart track listing
- 24 tracks: 1. "Living for Love"; 2. "Devil Pray"; 3. "Ghosttown"; 4. "Unapologetic Bitch"; 5. "Illuminati"; 6. "Bitch I'm Madonna"; 7. "Hold Tight"; 8. "Joan of Arc"; 9. "Iconic"; 10. "HeartBreakCity"; 11. "Body Shop"; 12. "Holy Water"; 13. "Inside Out"; 14. "Wash All Over Me"; Deluxe edition: 15. "Best Night"; 16. "Veni Vidi Vici"; 17. "S.E.X."; 18. "Messiah"; 19. "Rebel Heart"; Media Markt deluxe edition: 20. "Auto-Tune Baby"; Super deluxe edition (Disc 2): 1. "Beautiful Scars"; 2. "Borrowed Time"; 3. "Addicted"; 4. "Graffiti Heart"

"Wash All Over Me" is a song recorded by American singer Madonna for her thirteenth studio album, Rebel Heart (2015). The song is a pop ballad that makes use of a "baroque piano" over a "contemplative melody". Madonna co-wrote and co-produced the song with Avicii, Mike Dean and Kanye West; additional writers include Arash Pournouri, Salem Al Fakir, Magnus Lidehäll, Vincent Pontare and Tommy Brown, with Charlie Heat serving as a co-producer.

An early demo of "Wash All Over Me", as well as the finalized track, both leaked onto the internet prior to the album's scheduled release. The actual version was made available on March 6, 2015, whilst its precedent mix was predominantly influenced by disco and house music before being reworked in the album cut. Lyrically, "Wash All Over Me" portrays Madonna addressing her insecurities and the release that follows, in addition to her questioning her career's longevity. The recording was generally well received by music critics, with the majority of them comparing it to the singer's previous work on Like a Prayer (1989), Ray of Light (1998) and Confessions on a Dance Floor (2005).

== Background and release ==
When beginning recording sessions for her then-upcoming thirteenth studio album, Madonna enlisted a large team of songwriters and producers for the project. In mid 2014, she uploaded a photo to her Instagram account, which revealed her playing the guitar alongside Swedish electronic musician Avicii. During November 2014, a demo of the unfinished "Wash All Over Me" leaked onto the internet, resulting in Madonna taking to her Instagram account once again, where she described the situation as "terrorism" and a form of "artistic rape". The unintended leaks led the singer to release six completed tracks through iTunes as a pre-order for the album on December 20, 2014. Following this, Avicii was rumored to have produced twelve additional recordings that subsequently leaked.

The demo version of "Wash All Over Me" was considerably different from the reworked version, with Robbie Daw of Idolator finding the leak to have a "disco/house vibe" with "the constant presence of an acoustic guitar". In the album's early development stages, Madonna played a handful of unfinished demos to Kanye West, who later agreed to work with the singer on several tracks, including "Wash All Over Me". Rebel Heart was leaked online in its entirety on February 3, 2015, more than a month in advance to its scheduled release. The final mix of "Wash All Over Me" was subsequently released with its parent record on March 6, 2015.

== Recording and composition ==
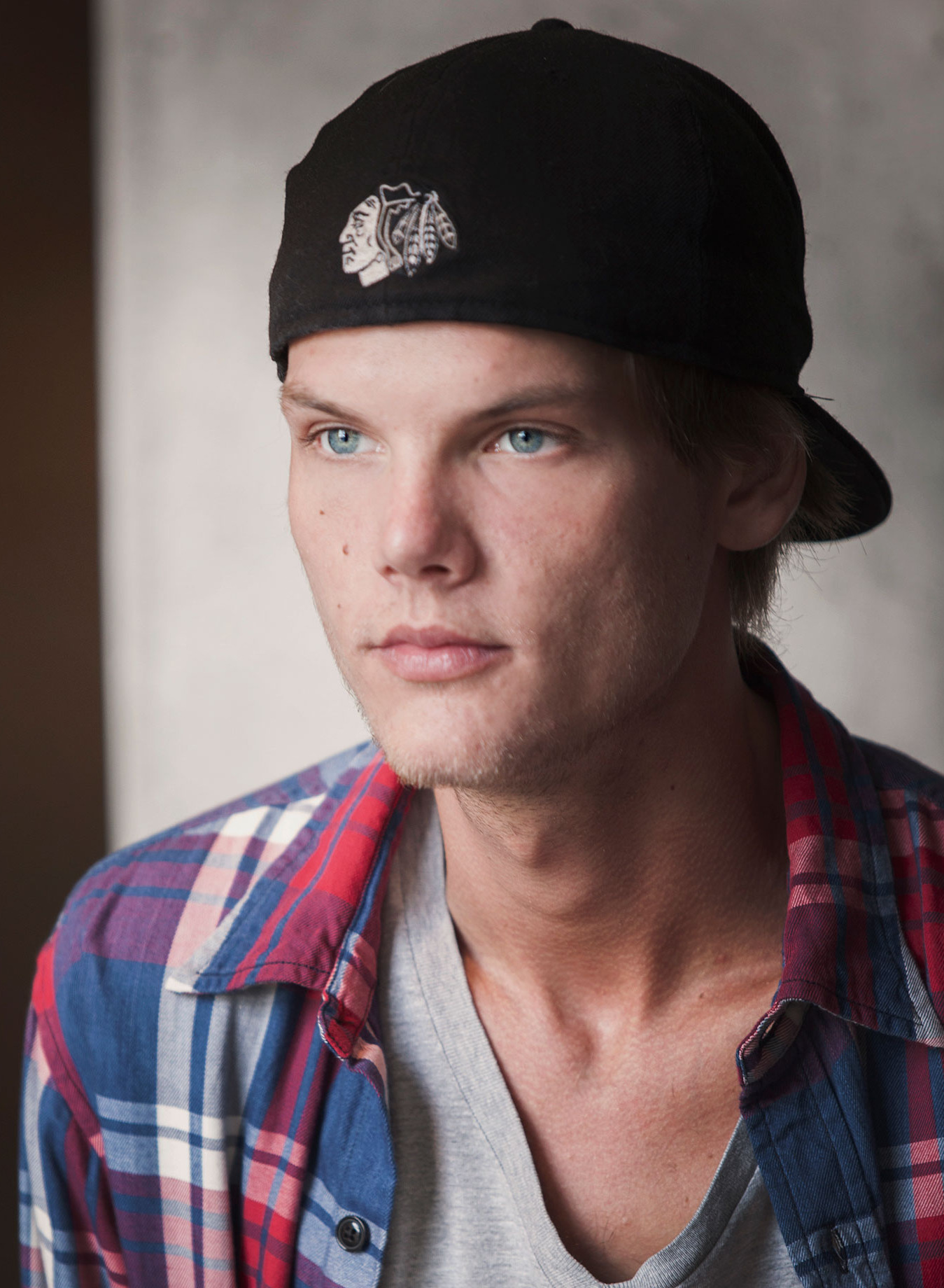
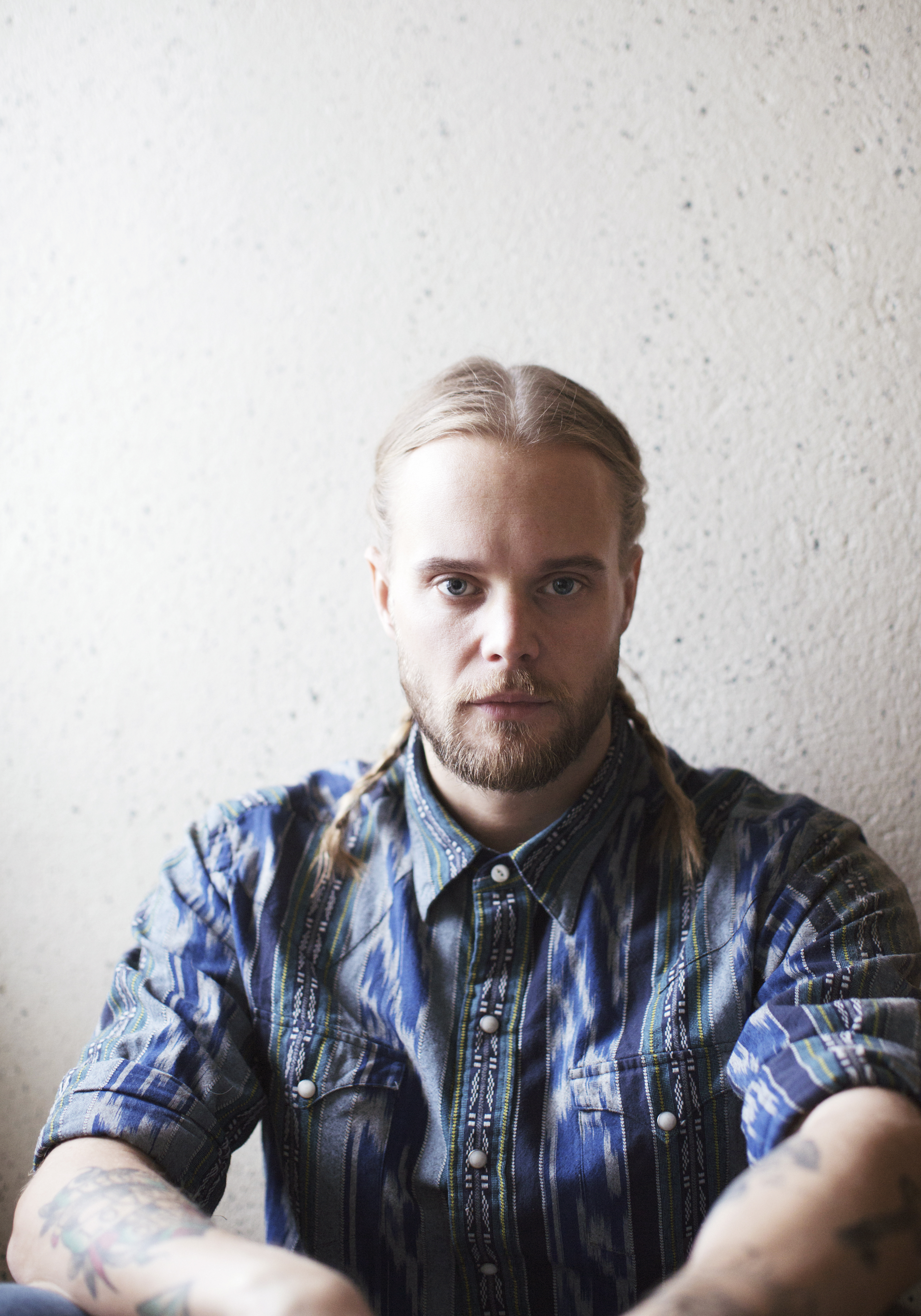
Two of the songwriters included Avicii (left) and Vincent Pontare (right).

"Wash All Over Me" was written by Madonna, Avicii, Arash Pournouri, Salem Al Fakir, Magnus Lidehäll, Vincent Pontare, Mike Dean, Kanye West and Tommy Brown, while being produced by Madonna, Avicii, Dean and West; furthermore, Charlie Heat serves as a co-producer. Dean further contributed to the drum programming, engineering, mixing, guitars and keyboards, while Demacio "Demo" Castellon provided the engineering and mixing. Pontare also recorded additional vocals for the track. The song is a ballad which according to Saeed Saeed of The National, features "baroque piano". The song has a thoughtful melody consisting of a melancholic structure. In regards to Avicii's contributions, Kitty Empire, writing for The Guardian, commented that he "play[s] Andrew Lloyd Webber to [Madonna's] Tim Rice".

Lyrically, "Wash All Over Me" addresses "insecurity and the release that comes in admitting it". Jim Farber from New York Daily News opined that Madonna "ponders either running from, or accepting the end of, her career", whereas Adam R. Holz of Plugged In found Madonna "confront[ing] confusion, fear and change". Regarding the lyrics "I walk this razor's edge / Will I stand or will I fall?", Sasha Geffen of Consequence of Sound expressed that: "When the world that you made goes onto change without you, keeping up becomes a bigger and bigger risk. If you're Madonna, you take that risk no matter how likely you are to come out the other side without stumbling."

The track's second verse portrays Madonna singing: "Gonna watch the sun going down / I'm not gonna run from all this madness", where "she surveys her present condition but vows to keep on moving". The singer further makes a reference to the Tower of Babylon and calls attention to changes in the music industry: "In a world that's changing, I'm a stranger in a strange land / There's a contradiction and I'm stuck here in between". She later concludes that: "Life is like a desert, an oasis to confuse me".

== Critical reception ==
"Wash All Over Me" was received positively by music critics. Amy Pettifer of The Quietus praised the track for "ha[ving] all the melancholy pleasure of 'The Power of Good-Bye'"; she later stated that "it's older, wiser and more accepting of endings". Sal Cinquemani, writing for Slant Magazine, noted that the song "return[s] to the lush, spiritual introspection of Ray of Light," further called it "exquisite". Likewise, Neil McCormick of The Daily Telegraph agreed, stating it "recall[s] [...] rich depths". Geffen labeled it an "essential track" from Rebel Heart, writing that it "arrives like a vivid counterpoint to 'Living for Love'". Saeed Saeed of The National congratulated the singer for "another addition to [her] underrated collection of ballads", explaining that "this century has been unkind to Madonna, who has had her share of heartbreak." Andy Gill, writing for The Independent, felt it was a "most welcome reminder" that "recall[s] the career-apex achievements of Like a Prayer".

Jeff Nelson from People found that "Wash All Over Me" serves as a reminder that "she's still a person". Nelson went on stating that "it's tracks like the aforementioned 'Wash All Over Me' [...] that showcase the megastar's vulnerable, relatable side". Brad Stern, an editor and publisher for MuuMuse, commented that "Wash All Over Me" was "very Confessions-esque", further calling it "a truly curious concoction of sound". In response to a fan of the singer, Stern agreed that it was "fabulous and very emotional", and opined that "the lyrics are much more intriguing than, say, taking shots of Tanqueray like a girl gone wild." Nouse's Jack Elliott applauded "Wash All Over Me", describing it as "a lyrically powerful, yet vulnerable ending to the album that could be interpreted as a track celebrating triumph or defeat. It is up to you to interpret it as you wish."

== Credits and personnel ==
Credits and personnel adapted from Madonna's official website.

=== Management ===
- Webo Girl Publishing, Inc. (ASCAP)
- EMI Blackwood Music Inc. (BMI) o/b/o EMI Music Publishing Scandinavia AB (STIM)
- Sony/ATV Songs LLC (BMI) o/b/o Sony/ATV Music Publishing Scandinavia AB (STIM)
- Universal Polygram International (ASCAP) o/b/o Universal Music Publishing AB (STIM)
- Warner-Tamerlane Pub Corp. o/b/o itself and Papa George Music (BMI)
- Please Gimme My Publishing c/o EMI Blackwood Music, Inc. (BMI)/Sony/ATV Songs LLC (BMI).

=== Personnel ===
- Madonna – vocals, songwriter, producer
- Tim Bergling – songwriter, producer
- Tommy Brown – songwriter
- Demacio "Demo" Castellon – engineer, audio mixer
- Mike Dean – songwriter, producer, keyboards, drum programming, engineer, mixer, guitar
- Salem Al Fakir – songwriter
- Noah Goldstein – engineer, audio mixer
- Charlie Heat – co-producer
- Magnus Lidehäll – songwriter
- Zeke Mishanec – additional recording
- Vincent Pontare – songwriter, additional backing vocals
- Ron Taylor – additional PT editing
- Kanye West – songwriter, producer
