= Holy Water (Madonna song) =

Song by Madonna

from the album Rebel Heart
- Released: March 6, 2015
- Recorded: 2014
- Genre: Electronica; technopop
- Length: 4:09
- Label: Interscope
- Songwriters: Madonna; Martin Kierszenbaum; Natalia Keery-Fisher; Mike Dean; Kanye West; Tommy Brown
- Producers: Madonna; Dean; West; Charlie Heat (co-production)

Rebel Heart track listing
- 24 tracks: 1. "Living for Love"; 2. "Devil Pray"; 3. "Ghosttown"; 4. "Unapologetic Bitch"; 5. "Illuminati"; 6. "Bitch I'm Madonna"; 7. "Hold Tight"; 8. "Joan of Arc"; 9. "Iconic"; 10. "HeartBreakCity"; 11. "Body Shop"; 12. "Holy Water"; 13. "Inside Out"; 14. "Wash All Over Me"; Deluxe edition: 15. "Best Night"; 16. "Veni Vidi Vici"; 17. "S.E.X."; 18. "Messiah"; 19. "Rebel Heart"; Media Markt deluxe edition: 20. "Auto-Tune Baby"; Super deluxe edition (Disc 2): 1. "Beautiful Scars"; 2. "Borrowed Time"; 3. "Addicted"; 4. "Graffiti Heart"

Licensed audio
- "Holy Water" on YouTube

"Holy Water" is a song recorded by American singer and songwriter Madonna for her thirteenth studio album, Rebel Heart (2015). The song was written by Madonna, Martin Kierszenbaum, Natalia Keery-Fisher, Mike Dean, Kanye West and Tommy Brown. It was produced by Madonna, Dean and West, with Charlie Heat serving as co-producer. The demo of "Holy Water" leaked on to the internet in late December 2014 and the final version leaked in February 2015, a month prior to the album's release. "Holy Water" is an electronica and technopop song, and it features minimalist bass stutter, ricocheting synths and "martial beats" in its instrumentation.

Lyrically, the song talks about cunnilingus, where Madonna compares her vaginal fluids to holy water, juxtaposing Christian imagery with sexuality. "Holy Water" divided music critics; some deemed it a standout and one of the most scandalous tracks of Madonna's career, while others felt it was embarrassing and over the top. The song was included on the set list of her Rebel Heart Tour (2015–16). The performance contained dancers dressed as nuns, the singer gyrating around the cross while standing on a dancer and a reenactment of the Last Supper. It was target of controversies in Singapore, where Madonna excluded it from the setlist and was criticized by the Catholic Church.

== Background and release ==
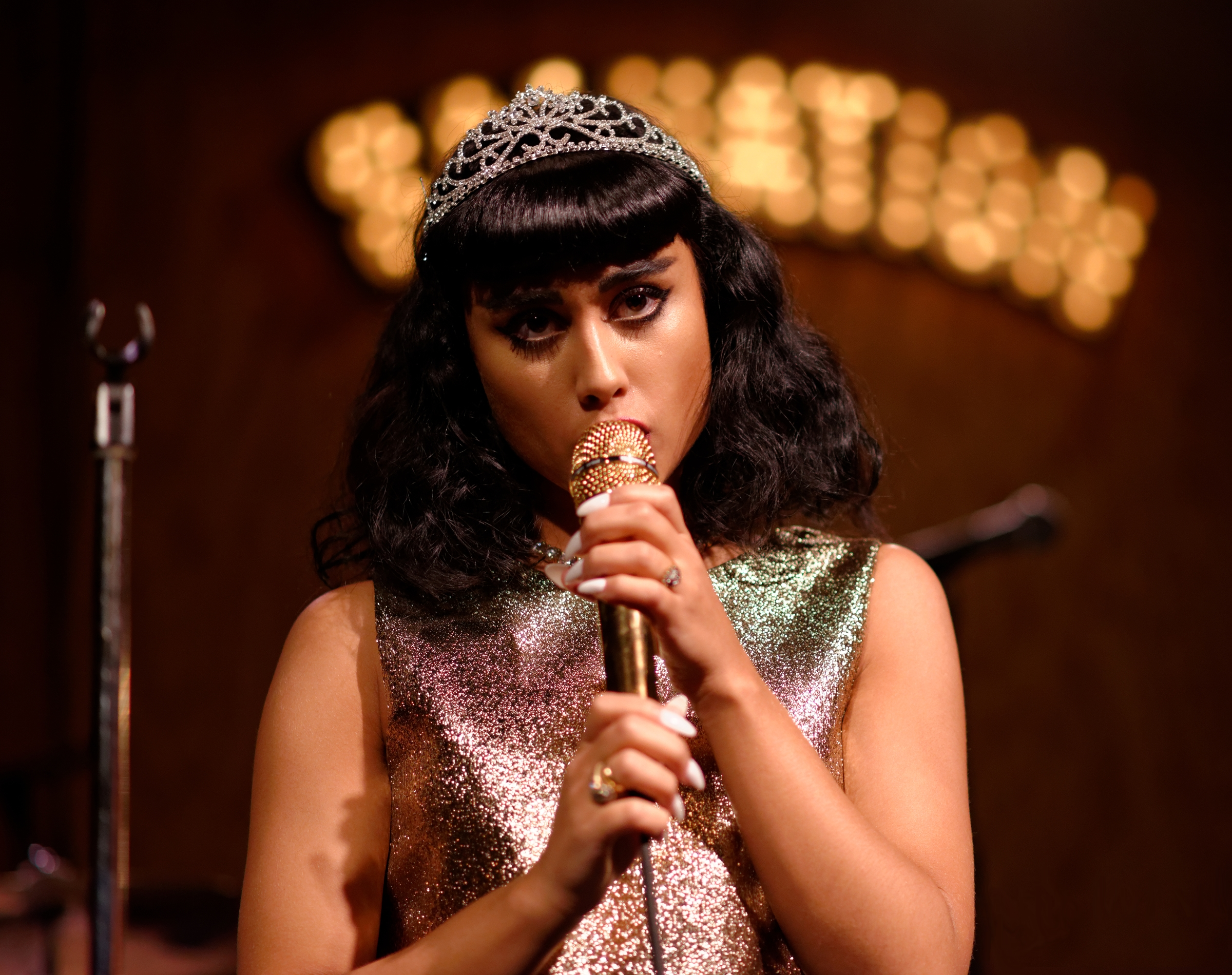
Natalia Kills (pictured) co-wrote "Holy Water" with Madonna.

While working on Rebel Heart, Madonna enlisted a range of composers and producers to work with her. On April 9, 2014, she uploaded a picture of herself on her Instagram with Natalia Kills and Martin Kierszenbaum, hinting that they were working in some songs for the album, by posting: "Working the midnight shift with Natalia Kills. 2 girls on a couch... don't it taste like Holy Water? #artforfreedom #rebelheart #revolutionoflove". In the picture, Madonna was seen sitting with Kills in front of two microphones, and as noted by Keith Caulfield of Billboard, "[i]n the foreground is Martin Kierszenbaum, the founder and chairman of Cherrytree Records and senior executive of A&R for Interscope Records". In an interview for Paper, Kills revealed that Madonna's dancers used to play Kills' songs during their rehearsals and workouts every week, which interested Madonna to collaborate with her. Together they wrote eight songs in one week, with Kills commenting about Madonna: "She writes incredible lyrics, sings beautiful melodies, but most of all she is so fucking funny".

Later, Madonna played a lot of her unfinished songs from Rebel Heart for Kanye West, who agreed to work with the singer and ended up co-producing three of the songs on the record, including "Holy Water". On December 17, 2014, thirteen unfinished demos from Madonna's then-upcoming album leaked online, prompting the singer to rush-release six tracks from the album on the iTunes Store upon pre-order of the album three days later. A week later, over 14 new demos leaked online; among them "Holy Water" was also present. Later, on February 3, 2015, more than a month ahead of the album's release date, the finished version of the song leaked online.

== Recording and composition ==
"Holy Water" was written by Madonna, Martin Kierszenbaum, Natalia Keery-Fisher, Mike Dean, Kanye West and Tommy Brown. It was produced by Madonna, Dean and West, and co-produced by Charlie Heat. Dean was also responsible for keyboards, drum programming, engineering and mixing. Demacio "Demo" Castellon also contributed to the track's engineering and mixing. "Holy Water" is an electronica and technopop song, and it features "a minimalist bass burble", "martial beats", and ricocheting synths in its instrumentation. "Holy Water" interpolates her own song "Vogue" during the track's bridge, with the singer commending "strike a pose" over a rhythmic base. She also offers "orgasmic gasps" throughout the track.

Lyrically, the song talks about worshiping cunnilingus, with Madonna comparing oral sex to holy water, and as noted by Billboard's Vanessa Grigoriadis, it was named after her lifelong obsessions, since it features "church-baiting innuendos," "juxtaposing Christian imagery with frank sexuality". During the spoken chorus, she sings: "Kiss it better, kiss it better/ Make it better, make it wetter", and later she speaks, "If you like it please confess / Bless yourself and genuflect". In the hook, she claims: "Don't it taste like holy water?", before clarifying: "Yeezus loves my pussy best". Adam R. Holz of Plugged In noted that the song "finds Madonna returning to her longstanding habit of sexing up spiritual imagery".

== Critical reception ==
"Holy Water" divided music critics. Spencer Kornhaber of The Atlantic called it "easily the catchiest moment of the album." Annie Zaleski of The A.V. Club wrote that the track is a highlight, "a stern, grayscale technopop team-up with Natalia Kills." Writing in The National, author Saeed Saeed named it "the most scandalous Madonna track this decade", declaring that "[t]he brooding bass-filled verse gives way to a poptastic chorus that uses hedonistic sound effects harking back to her 1990 'Justify My Love.'" Bradley Stern of MuuMuse also found it to be "the most shocking moment of sexploitation", declaring: "blasphemy has truly never tasted sweeter." The Daily Telegraph's Andy Gill noted that the song "manages to be sacrilegious and ear-burningly naughty." While reviewing Rebel Heart in Time Out, Nick Levine called it "a brilliantly ridiculous hymn to cunnilingus", where Madonna manages to "alternate between showing off, getting off and taking stock." Amy Pettifer of The Quietus praised the track for being "rich with Nicki vibes, without Nicki actually making a second appearance", claiming: "Sex has always been one of M's favourite subjects, particularly when it's hand in daring hand with religion; here she performs a kind of erotic baptism while a Moroder-esque bass underscores her sermon. It's one of many strong choruses that take you somewhere unexpected." She also praised the "Vogue" sample and defined the track as a "cunning turn from the Holy Madonna and Baby Yeezus."

Kyle Anderson of Entertainment Weekly wrote that Madonna sells the song, due to "the bass gurgles that remind[ed him] of classic Massive Attack or the reference to 'Vogue.'" PopMatters's Evan Sawdey enjoyed the sense of dirty fun that permeates "Holy Water", writing that "Madonna sounds very much at home with aggressive sentiments like 'Bitch, get off my pole' and 'Yeezus loves my pussy best', blatantly toying around with religious iconography while having a bit of provocative fun." He also found the "Vogue" sample "a rare case of Madonna acknowledging her own legacy." Sal Cinquemani of Slant Magazine noted that the song is "a welcome bit of percolating electronica". Cinquemani commended the inclusion of the word "genuflect" in a pop song, but also felt that "Madonna's Catholic baiting [is] like a reflex at this point". The reviewer believed that Madonna deliberately included provocative lyrics in the song, either to bring back her persona Dita Parlo from her 1992 studio album Erotica, or just to make a statement "about women of a certain age unapologetically flexing their libidos".

Stephen Thomas Erlewine of AllMusic called it a "detour", where Madonna "indulge[s] in both Erotica-era taboo-busting sleaze." Ben Kelly wrote in Attitude that he felt the song was "a little reductive". John Marrs of Gay Times agreed, calling it "a bit embarrassing and reductive." In her review of the album, The Guardian's Kitty Empire labelled it a silly track that "maintain[s] the long-term narrative of Catholic-poking that runs through Madonna's libidinous oeuvre." Lewis Corner of Digital Spy opined that the track is "frustrating because the production is sharp and offers some of the most interesting moments on the album, but the overtly sexual lyrics feel like forced shock value. [...] Of course, shocking the audience is Madonna's business, but here it feels more crass than clever." Writing for Billboard, Joe Levy defined it as "some of the most absurdly lubricious sex songs of her absurdly lubricious career." In August 2018, Billboard picked it as the singer's 83rd greatest song, calling it "a revved up version of her seductive Erotica-era bedroom romps [...] Only Madonna could make blasphemy taste this good". Caryn Ganz of Rolling Stone called it an "over-the-top sex song" and a "cringy track." In his review of Rebel Heart, Mark Lore from Paste said that the song "fail[s] to reach the more restrained sexiness of 'Justify My Love'." Greg Kot of the Chicago Tribune was more critical, writing that in "Holy Water" Madonna "conflates religion and erotica for the 3,243rd time in [her] career."

== Live performance ==
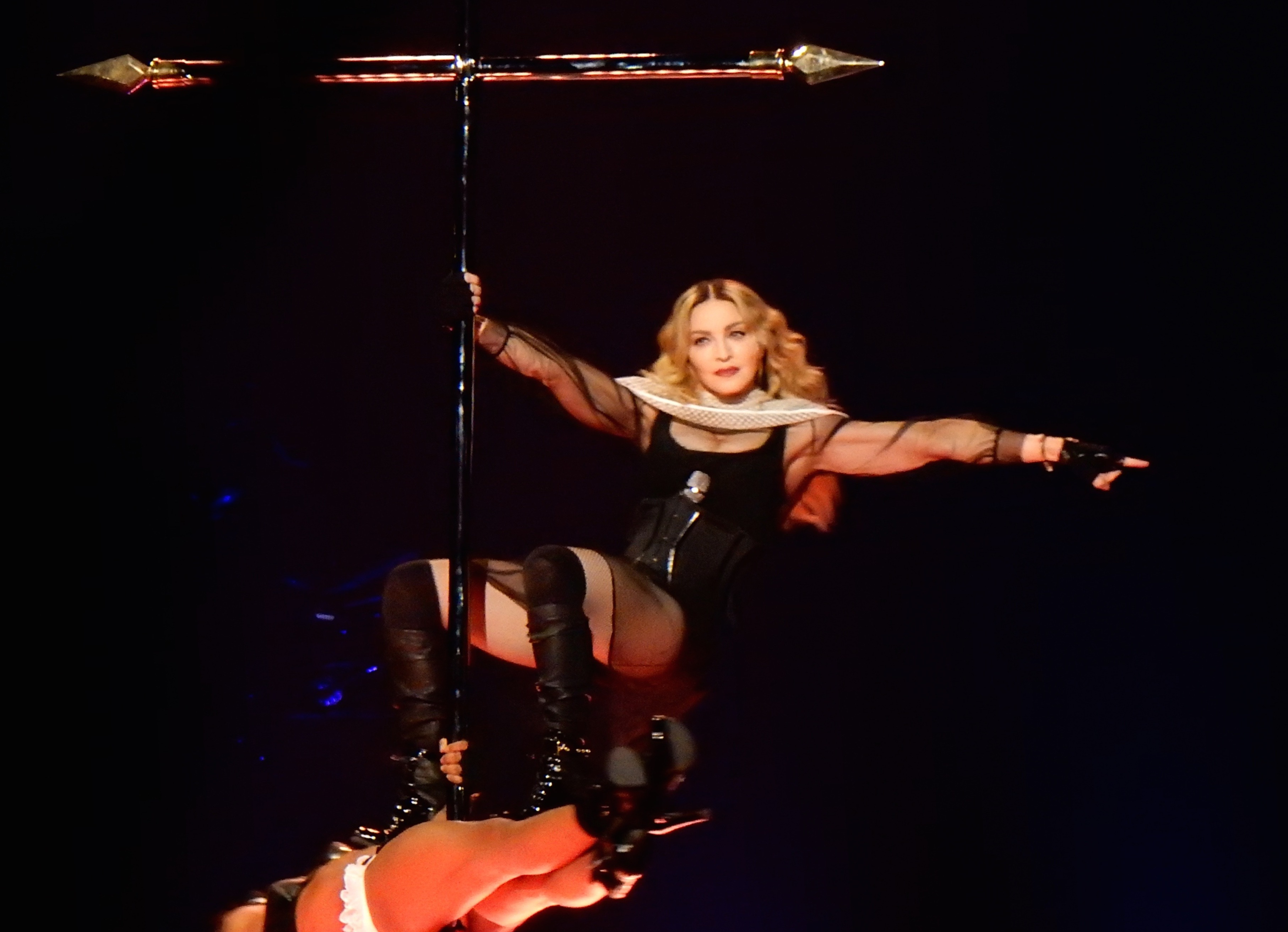
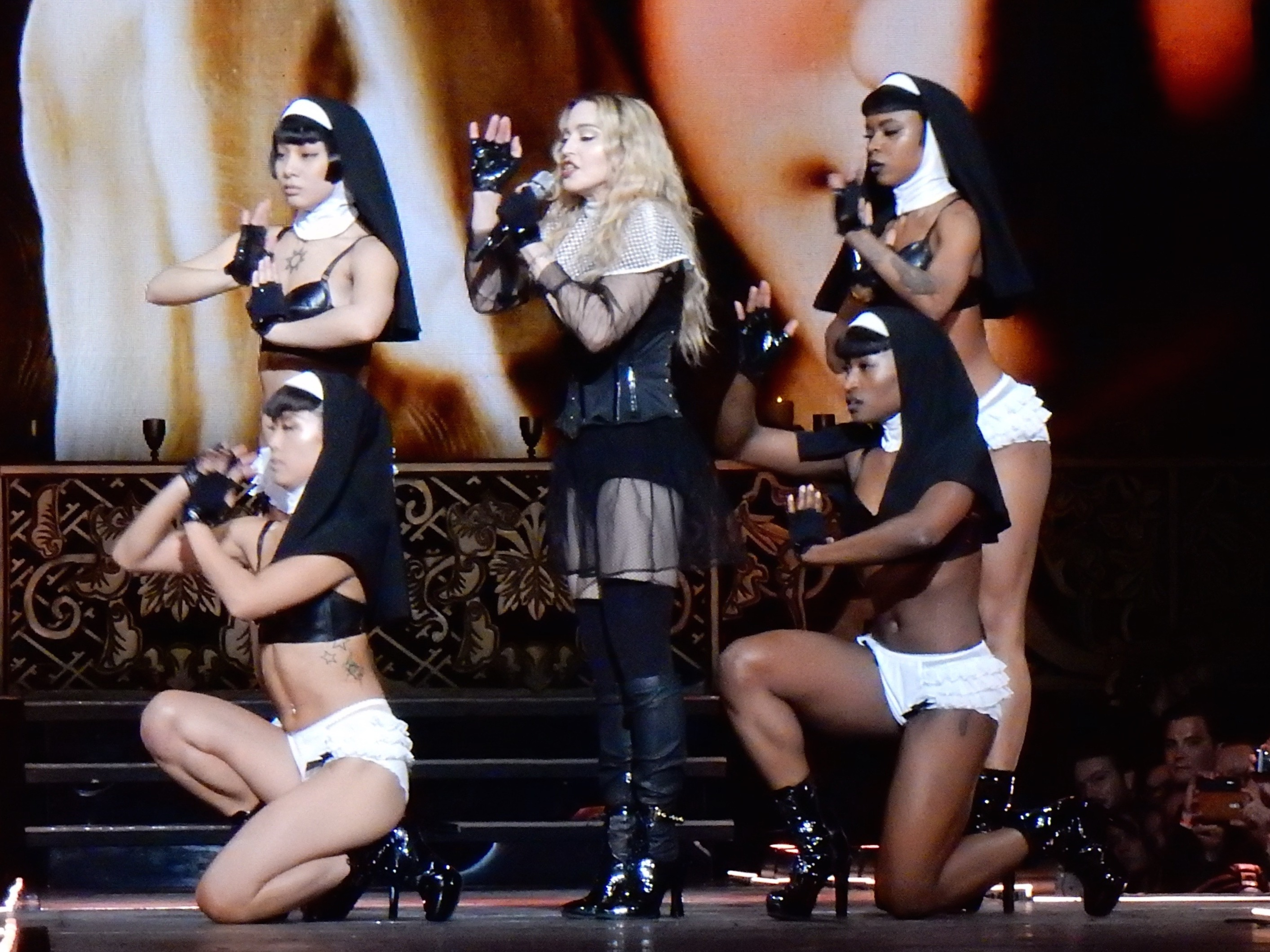
The Rebel Heart Tour's mashup performance of "Holy Water" and "Vogue" saw Madonna standing on a dancer while twirling on a cross.

"Holy Water" was included on the set list of Madonna's Rebel Heart Tour (2015–2016) as part of the first segment. For the performance, her dancers were dressed as nuns in hot pants, bikini tops and high-heeled boots, and it also features "grinding, lingerie and priests". During the middle of the performance, Madonna "gyrate[s] alongside pole-dancing", straddling and writhing a dancer dressed as a nun. She also performed parts of "Vogue" (1990) near the end of the performance. For the finale, Madonna reenacted the Last Supper and portrayed an orgy onstage with the dancers, one of them dressed as Jesus Christ. The performance of the song at the March 19–20, 2016 shows in Sydney's Allphones Arena was recorded and released in the singer's fifth live album, Rebel Heart Tour.

The performance of "Holy Water" polarized reviewers. Neil McCormick of The Daily Telegraph named it "inarguably another fantastic display of showbiz shock and awe from a mistress of the form." Jon Pareles of The New York Times named it "the show's blasphemy quota", while Michael Hamersly of Miami Herald called it an "over-the-top" performance. Jordan Zivitz of The Montreal Gazette opined: "Twenty-six years after 'Like a Prayer''s video scandalized the Vatican and parents who relied on MTV as a cheap babysitter, the sight of dancers twisting down steel crucifixes while Madonna snapped 'bitch, get off my pole' in 'Holy Water' was hopefully intended to be comical".

During the Asian-leg of the tour in Singapore, Madonna was banned from performing "Holy Water" by the Media Development Authority (MDA) due to the "sexually explicit" and "religiously sensitive" nature of the act. A spokesperson from the MDA stated: "In determining the rating, MDA had carefully reviewed the proposed set list and consulted the Arts Consultative Panel. Religiously sensitive content which breached our guidelines, such as the song 'Holy Water', will thus not be performed in Singapore". The concert organizers wanted to comply with their R18 rating and remove any content or material offending race or religion. Other songs such as "Iconic" and "Devil Pray" were also removed from the set list.

== Credits and personnel ==
=== Management ===
- Webo Girl Publishing, Inc. (ASCAP)/Martin Cherrytree Music and Songs of Universal (BMI)
- The Kills Effect (BMI) c/o Songs of Universal/Warner-Tamerlane Pub Corp. o/b/o itself and Papa George Music (BMI)
- Please Gimme My Publishing c/o EMI Blackwood Music, Inc. (BMI)/Sony/ATV Songs LLC (BMI).

=== Personnel ===
- Madonna – vocals, songwriter, record producer
- Martin Kierszenbaum – songwriter
- Natalia Keery-Fisher – songwriter
- Mike Dean – songwriter, producer, keyboards, drum programming, engineer, mixer
- Kanye West – songwriter, producer
- Tommy Brown – songwriter
- Charlie Heat – co-producer
- Noah Goldstein – engineer
- Demacio "Demo" Castellon – engineer, audio mixer
- Zeke Mishanec – additional recording
- Ron Taylor – additional PT editing

Credits adapted from Madonna's official website.
