= Rebel Heart (Madonna song) =

2015 song by Madonna

Song by Madonna

from the album Rebel Heart
- Released: March 6, 2015
- Genre: Pop; EDM
- Length: 3:21
- Label: Interscope, Warner
- Songwriters: Madonna; Tim Bergling; Arash Pournouri; Salem Al Fakir; Magnus Lidehäll; Vincent Pontare
- Producers: Madonna; Avicii; Salem Al Fakir; Magnus Lidehäll; Vincent Pontare

Rebel Heart track listing
- 24 tracks: 1. "Living for Love"; 2. "Devil Pray"; 3. "Ghosttown"; 4. "Unapologetic Bitch"; 5. "Illuminati"; 6. "Bitch I'm Madonna"; 7. "Hold Tight"; 8. "Joan of Arc"; 9. "Iconic"; 10. "HeartBreakCity"; 11. "Body Shop"; 12. "Holy Water"; 13. "Inside Out"; 14. "Wash All Over Me"; Deluxe edition: 15. "Best Night"; 16. "Veni Vidi Vici"; 17. "S.E.X."; 18. "Messiah"; 19. "Rebel Heart"; Media Markt deluxe edition: 20. "Auto-Tune Baby"; Super deluxe edition (Disc 2): 1. "Beautiful Scars"; 2. "Borrowed Time"; 3. "Addicted"; 4. "Graffiti Heart"

Licensed audio
- "Rebel Heart" on YouTube

"Rebel Heart" is a song recorded by American singer Madonna for her thirteenth studio album of the same name (2015). Madonna co-wrote and co-produced the song with Avicii, Arash Pournouri, Salem Al Fakir, Magnus Lidehäll and Vincent Pontare. An early demo of "Rebel Heart", as well as the final version, leaked to the internet prior to the album's scheduled release. The final version was made available on March 6, 2015, when Rebel Heart was released. It was included as a bonus track on the deluxe version of the album.

While the demo was a dance song, the album version of "Rebel Heart" is acoustic and composed in a major key. The recording was generally well received by music critics, who admired the autobiographical nature of the composition where Madonna acknowledges her musical legacy. The song was included on the set list of the Rebel Heart Tour (2015–2016), where Madonna performed it in front of a backdrop displaying fan art. She also performed it during a concert in support of Hillary Clinton.

== Background and release ==
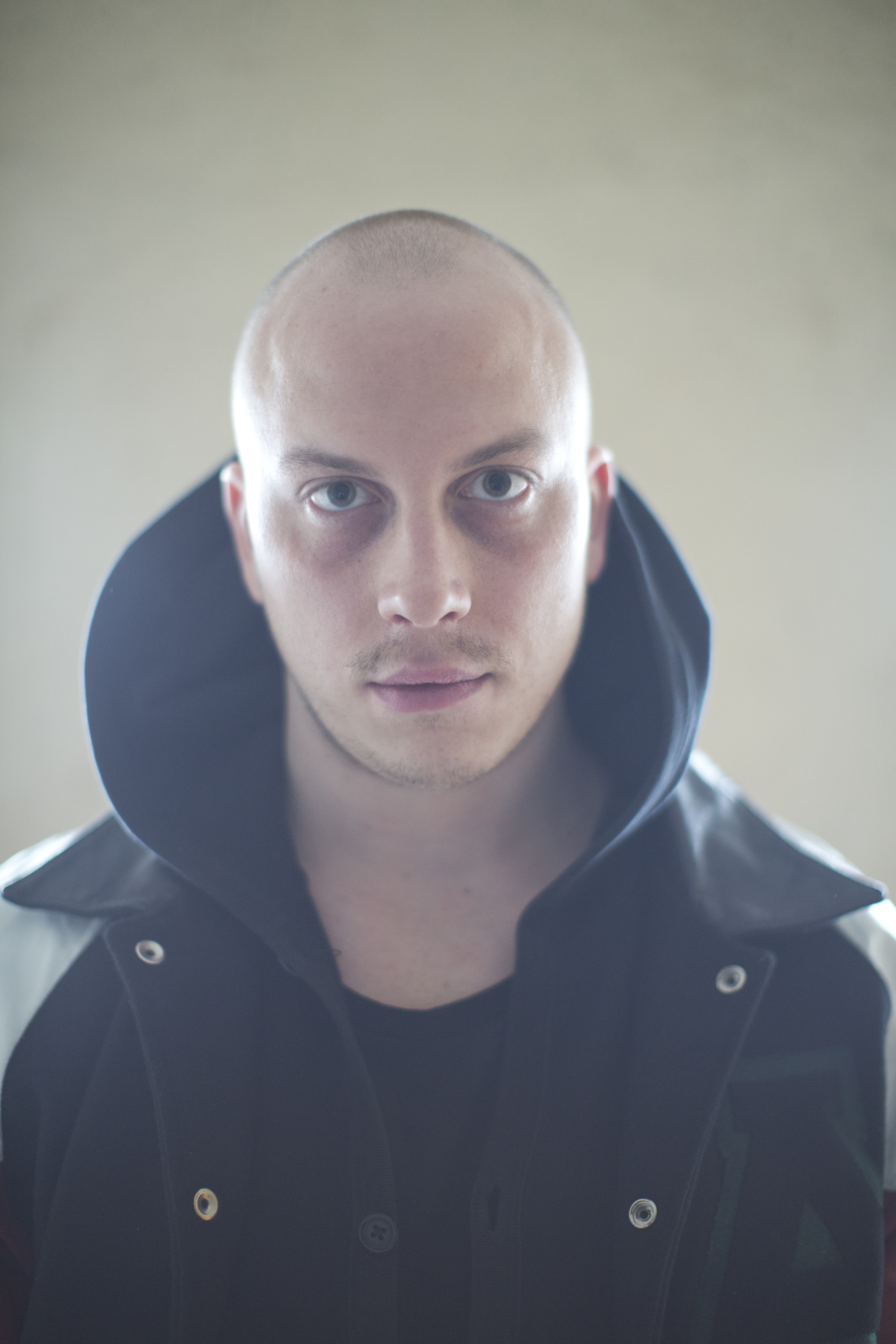
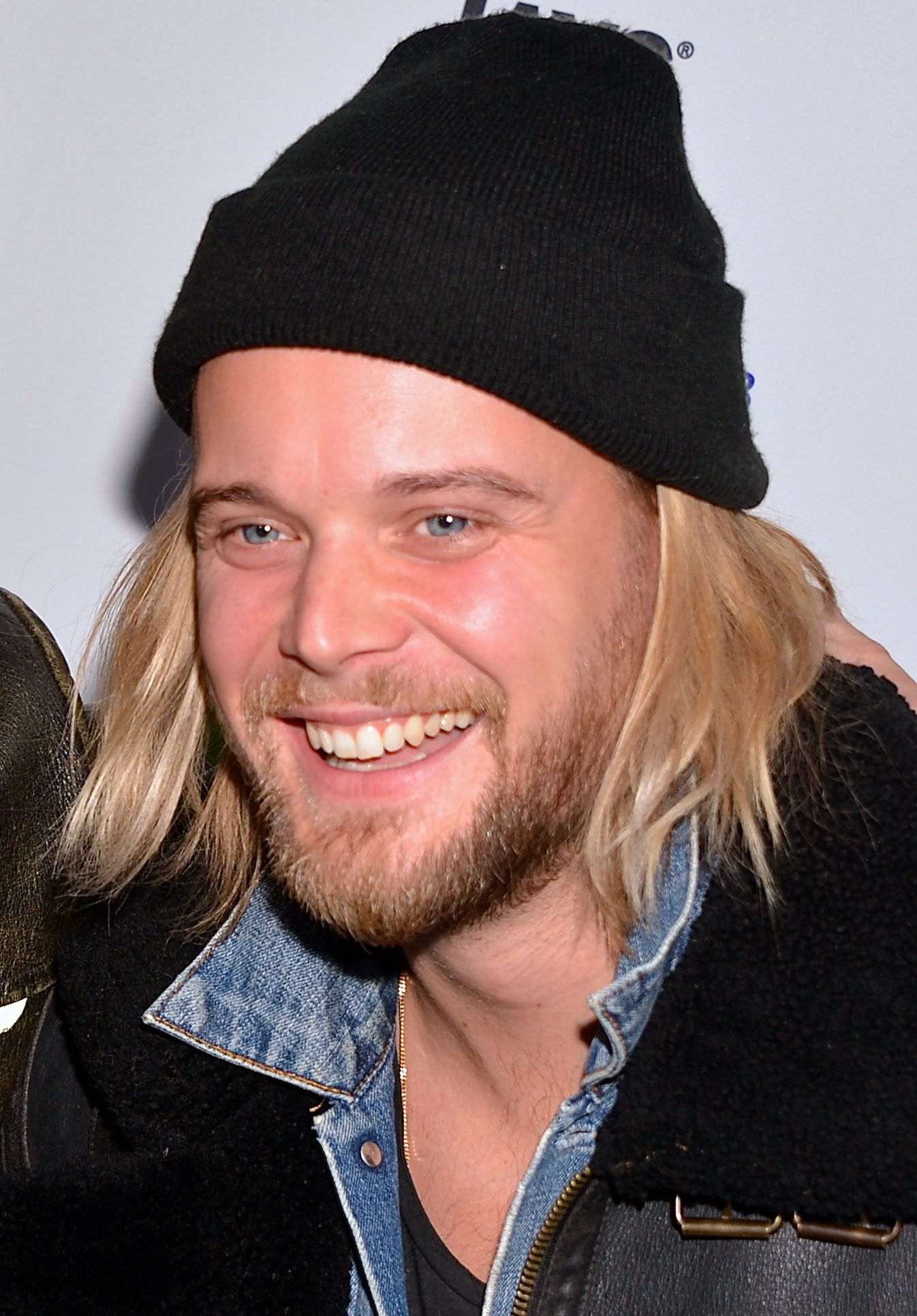
Magnus Lidehäll and Vincent Pontare (right), two of the writers and producers of the song

For working her thirteenth studio album, Madonna enlisted a large team of songwriters and producers. In March 2014, she uploaded a photo on her Instagram account of a sunset, along with the words "Rebel Heart" and the caption "Day turns into night. I wont give up the fight. Don't want to get to the end of my days... saying I Wasn't amazed! #revolutionoflove", which prompted speculation that she was preparing to release a new album or single. In mid 2014, she uploaded a picture that revealed her playing the guitar alongside Swedish electronic musician Avicii.

In November 2014, the demo of a song called "Rebel Heart" leaked onto the internet, resulting in Madonna taking to Instagram and posting a picture of a smashed iPod and explaining, "This broken ipod is a symbol of my broken heart! That my music has been stolen and leaked! I have been violated as a human and an artist! #fuckedupshit". She described the situation as "terrorism" and a form of "artistic rape". The unintended leaks led the singer to release six completed tracks through iTunes as a pre-order for the album on December 20, 2014. The album, also titled Rebel Heart, was leaked online in its entirety on February 3, 2015, more than a month in advance to its scheduled release. The final version was subsequently released only on the deluxe and super deluxe editions of the album on March 6, 2015.

== Recording and composition ==
The final version of "Rebel Heart" included in the album was changed drastically from the leaked demo, by incorporating an acoustic sound. It was written by Madonna with Avicii, Arash Pournouri, Salem Al Fakir, Magnus Lidehäll and Vincent Pontare and was produced by all of them, except Pournouri. It is sung in a major key, starting off with bright, upbeat guitar sounds according to Amy Pettifer of The Quietus. The song's instrumentation consists of finger claps and a violin. In the autobiographical lyrical content, Madonna acknowledges her legacy in the music business, singing lines like "Hell yeah, this is me, Right where I'm supposed to be", followed by the chorus.

According to Greg Kot of the Chicago Tribune, "Rebel Heart" hearkens back to the folk-rock music Madonna had done in the past, but differs due to the usage of finger claps and some "brisk strings". Kot found that with the lyrics "addressing character flaws and missteps with unprecedented candor, [the singer] suggests how a onetime provocateur can mature and still remain interesting, if not remain at the center of pop culture as she once was." Calling it the album's "most successful pop moment", Evan Sawdey from PopMatters observed that Madonna made numerous references to her past with the lyrics. He listed instances like Madonna's strained relationship with her father, to the singer's narcissistic image in the media. Sawdey also believed that instead of being "self-referential", the lyrics rather portrayed a more humane side of the singer.

== Critical reception ==
"Rebel Heart" received positive reviews from music critics. Pettifer wrote: "The last song on the album feels like the first to properly spring into aural life in an unapologetically major key [...] The song relates the story of its singer — who she was and how she became who she is – which is really the record's underlying conceit". Pettifer also wrote that the lyrics were "more auto-biographical and therefore more interesting". Bradley Stern, an editor and publisher for MuuMuse, also praised the song's autobiographical lyrics; "The message is sincere, vulnerable and undoubtedly true to Madonna's story, the music is strong and that chorus is utterly anthemic. Madonna hasn't had a truly rich, singer-songwriter, sing-along friendly record in a while — maybe since Music? — so it's kind of unbelievable to hear such a strong melody from the Queen again." He called it "one of her best songs in a long time". Stern preferred the leaked demo over the final original version.

Rolling Stone's Caryn Grant wrote that "the album is at its strongest when Madonna shoves everyone to the side and just tells it to us straight. So it's fitting that she wraps up the deluxe edition with the title track [...] Deep down, she does have a rebel heart — and you can't fault her for reminding us that pop music is all the better for it". Of the leaked demo, Daniel Welsh from The Huffington Post, wrote that "it's taken the best parts of Avicii's sound and blended them with Madonna, rather than giving us an ear-assaulting "Avicii feat. Madonna" number about 'putting your drinks up' and 'getting down on the floor'". Spin said it was the singer's "sweetest melody since 'What It Feels Like for a Girl', with her register dropped an octave or two until it resembles the Liz Phair of 2005's (underrated) Somebody's Miracle". Q magazine called it a "movingly autobiographical title track, where Madonna reflects at length on her career and her motivation. It makes you wonder what she thinks she has to prove in 2015 with a song like 'Bitch I'm Madonna' when she proved it all and we’ve been paying attention for years". In 2018, Billboard picked it as the singer's 72nd greatest song, calling it "a sentimental sing-along that looks back on her bumpy road to stardom, adding some shrugged-off self-awareness ("I spent some time as a narcissist...trying to be so provocative/ I said, 'Oh yeah, that was me'") to keep things from getting too schmaltzy".

== Live performances ==
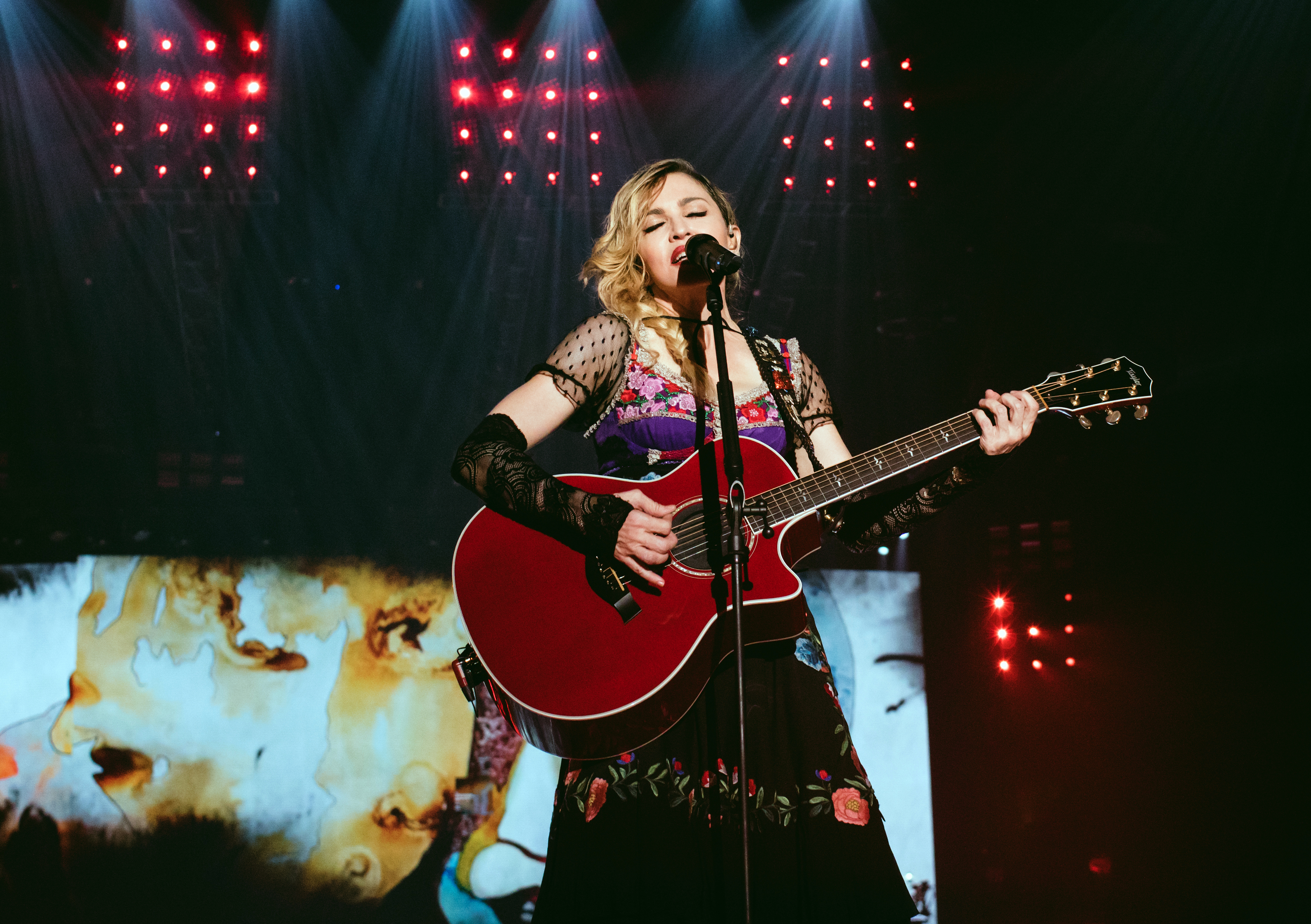
Madonna singing the track on the Rebel Heart Tour

The song was included on the setlist of the Rebel Heart Tour (2015–2016). It closed the show's third segment and featured Madonna dressed in a gypsy inspired dress created by Alessandro Michele for Gucci, consisting off a shawl, flamenco hat, lace, skirts and jacquard bodysuit, playing the acoustic guitar while the backdrop screens depicted a morph of fan art depicting many images of the singer throughout time. Madonna had previously launched an online contest calling her fans to submit their art for a digital gallery; those chosen winners would have their work displayed as backdrops during the tour.

Jordan Zivitz from the Montreal Gazette, wrote that "In the concert's second category, none stood out more than Rebel Heart's uplifting title track, presented as a statement of identity and gratitude". Conversely, Joshua Ostroff from The Huffington Post found that only few people could sing-along to the track on the tour, thereby proving that the new songs from the album had not connected with the audience. The performance of the song at the March 19–20, 2016 shows in Sydney's Allphones Arena was recorded and released in Madonna's fifth live album, Rebel Heart Tour (2017). On November 7, 2016, Madonna performed "Rebel Heart" as part of an impromptu acoustic concert at Washington Square Park in support of Hillary Clinton's presidential campaign.

== Credits and personnel ==
Credits and personnel adapted from Madonna's official website.

=== Management ===
- Webo Girl Publishing, Inc. (ASCAP) / EMI Blackwood Music Inc. (BMI) o/b/o EMI Music Publishing Scandinavia AB (STIM)
- Sony/ATV Songs LLC (BMI) o/b/o Sony/ATV Music Publishing Scandinavia AB (STIM) / Universal Polygram International (ASCAP) o/b/o Universal Music Publishing AB (STIM)
- Warner-Tamerlane Pub Corp. o/b/o itself and Papa George Music (BMI) / Please Gimme My Publishing c/o EMI Blackwood Music, Inc. (BMI)/Sony/ATV Songs LLC (BMI).

=== Personnel ===
- Madonna – vocals, songwriter, producer
- Tim Bergling – songwriter, producer
- Tommy Brown – songwriter
- Demacio "Demo" Castellon – engineer, audio mixer
- Salem Al Fakir – songwriter
- Noah Goldstein – engineer, audio mixer
- Magnus Lidehäll – songwriter
- Zeke Mishanec – additional recording
- Vincent Pontare – songwriter, additional backing vocals
- Ron Taylor – additional PT editing
