= DigiListan =

Swedish radio programme

DigiListan is a Swedish radio programme in SR P3 airing the top singles sold electronically to computers, mobile phones and other kinds of media players in Sweden (downloaded music). The statistics are created using Nielsen SoundScan.

The programme was first aired in January 2007. In January 2020, DigiListan took a break for an indefinite period due to suspected fraudulent listening activity. However, the break lasted only one week.

== See also ==
- Sverigetopplistan—Swedish national music chart
