= Rebel Heart Tour =

2015–16 concert tour by Madonna

- World tour by Madonna
- Promotional poster for the tour
- Location: Asia; Europe; North America; Oceania
- Associated album: Rebel Heart
- Start date: September 9, 2015
- End date: March 20, 2016
- Legs: 5
- No. of shows: 82
- Attendance: 1.045 million
- Box office: US$169.8 million (Note: US$227.79 million in 2025 dollars.)

Madonna concert chronology
- The MDNA Tour (2012); Rebel Heart Tour (2015–2016); Tears of a Clown (2016)

The Rebel Heart Tour was the tenth concert tour by American singer Madonna, staged in support of her thirteenth studio album, Rebel Heart (2015). Comprising 82 shows, the tour visited North America, Asia, Europe and Oceania. It began on September 9, 2015, at the Bell Centre in Montreal, Canada, and concluded on March 20, 2016, at the Allphones Arena in Sydney, Australia. The tour was officially announced on March 1, 2015, through Madonna's website and was led by Live Nation Entertainment's Global Touring Division, helmed by Arthur Fogel; this was the fifth collaboration between Madonna and Live Nation as well as her third tour to be promoted by the company. Additionally, the tour marked the singer's first visits to Taiwan, Thailand, Hong Kong, Macau, Philippines, Singapore, and New Zealand, and was her first to visit Australia and Puerto Rico since the Girlie Show (1993).

Rehearsals for the tour commenced following its announcement and lasted 10–12 hours per day, with involvement from Madonna's team of creative directors, producers, designers and choreographers. It was inspired by shows like Cirque du Soleil and Chinese New Year, as well as the films 300 (2006) and Grease (1978). Madonna enlisted Jamie King as the creative director, and Megan Lawson and Jason Yong as choreographers. The tour featured costumes from Moschino, Prada, Miu Miu, Gucci and Swarovski jewelry, and an elevated stage with a cross-shaped runway ending in a heart-shaped B-stage. Multimedia was created by Moment Factory, while sound and light were produced by Clay Paky and DiGiCo, respectively. The central theme of the concert was love and romance and, like past tours by the singer, was divided into different thematic segments: Joan of Arc/Samurai, Rockabilly Meets Tokyo, Latin/Gypsy, and Party/Flapper. The set list had more than 20 songs picked from Madonna's career along with material from Rebel Heart.

Despite a number of controversies, critics gave the tour generally positive reviews, with praise going to Madonna's stage presence, vocals and the imagery presented; it was also commercially successful, with all shows sold out, and an audience of over 1.05 million. Rebel Heart grossed $169.8 million, extending Madonna's record as the highest-grossing solo touring artist with total gross of $1.31 billion, beginning with 1990's Blond Ambition World Tour. This ranked her in third place on the all-time top-grossing Billboard Boxscore list, only behind the Rolling Stones and U2. The shows of March 19–20, 2016, performed at the Allphones Arena, were filmed by Danny Tull and Nathan Rissman for the film Madonna: Rebel Heart Tour. It premiered on December 9, 2016, on American cable channel Showtime while a live CD/DVD and Blu-ray was released on September 15, 2017.

== Background ==
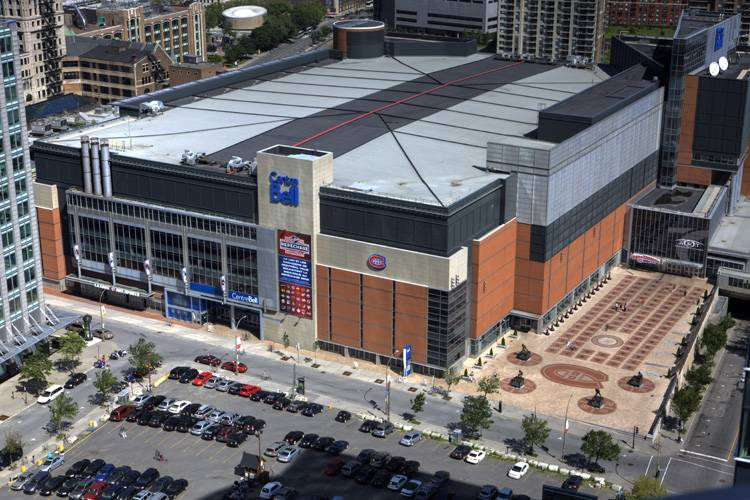
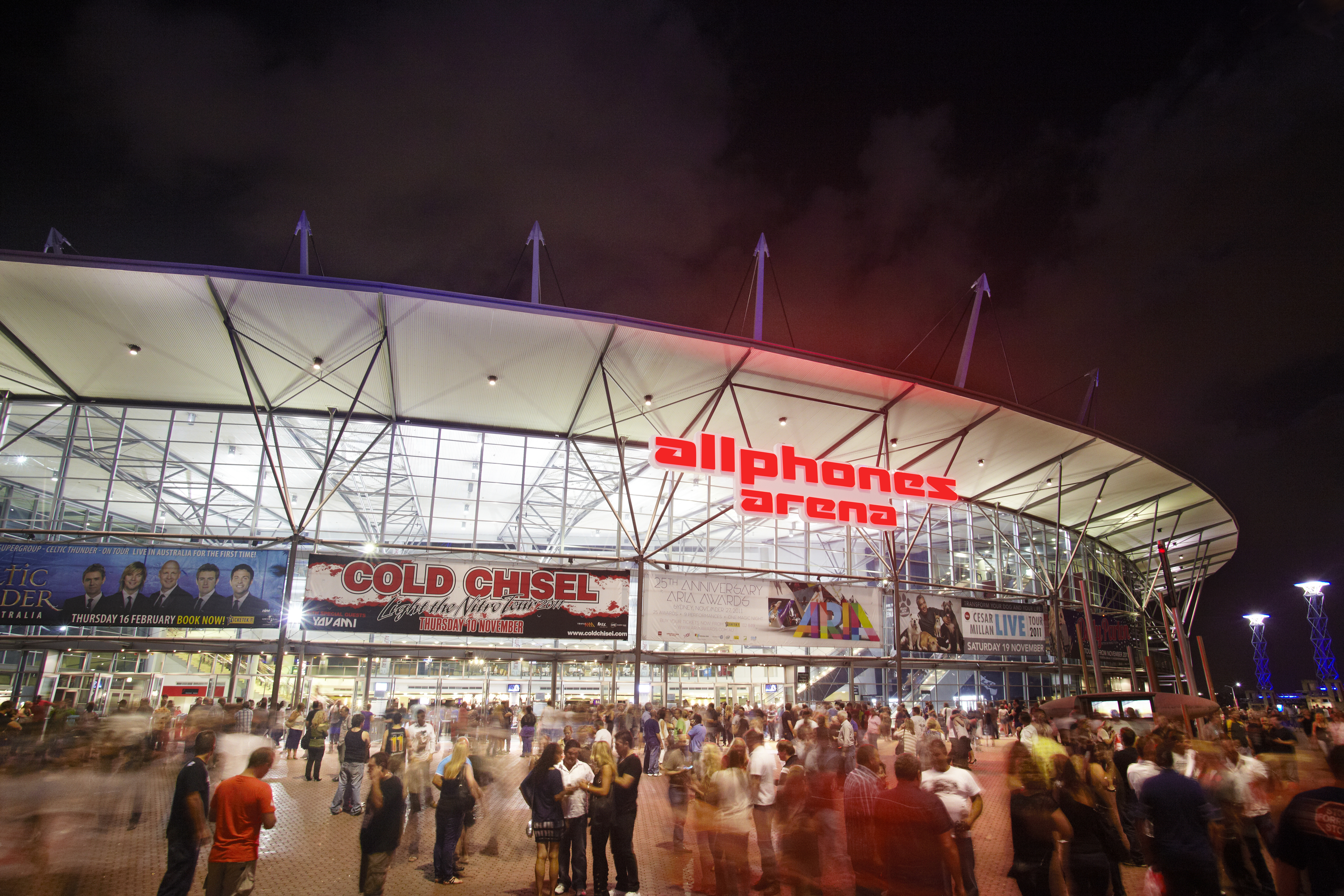
The Rebel Heart Tour began in Montreal, Canada at the Bell Centre (left) and ended in Sydney, Australia at Allphones Arena (right).

In March 2015, Madonna released her 13th studio album, Rebel Heart; the release was plagued by internet hackers leaking its content previously. Numerous news outlets started reporting about the supporting concert tour for the album, which was formally announced on March 1, 2015, on Madonna's official website. Titled Rebel Heart Tour, it was initially scheduled to begin on August 29, 2015, from Miami and continue throughout Europe, and end on December 20, 2015, in Glasgow, Scotland.

Rebel Heart was led by Live Nation Entertainment's Global Touring Division, helmed by Arthur Fogel. It was Madonna's fifth collaboration with Live Nation. Fogel commented that the leak had helped in bring more attention to Madonna's music and it was a positive scenario for the world tour. "It's kind of strange how it all came about, but it certainly hasn't been a negative in terms of getting people engaged with the new music. Anything that helps put it out there is good, even if it happens in a weird way", he concluded.

On May 21, 2015, Madonna rescheduled the first five dates of the tour and moved them to January 2016. The singer confirmed that arrangement logistics was the cause of the postponement and announced that the first date was changed to September 9, 2015, at Bell Centre in Montreal, Canada. Billboard reported Rebel Heart as an all-arena tour, and would visit cities where Madonna had not performed before. The tour visited Australia and New Zealand in early 2016, and was the singer's first visit to Australia in more than 20 years, having last toured there with the Girlie Show in 1993, and her first time in New Zealand. Philippines was added to the tour itinerary, for two performances at SM Mall of Asia in February 2016.

After the tour started, Madonna revealed another 16 dates in Asia and North America. They included first ever concerts in Taipei, Bangkok, Louisville, San Antonio, Tulsa and Nashville as well as her first concerts in Tokyo in a decade and additional dates in Mexico City and Houston. Singapore was added to the itinerary for February 28, 2016; the concert was rated as "adults only" by the Media Development Authority (MDA) of the country. Before arriving in Australia, Madonna announced an extra show on March 10, 2016, at Melbourne's Forum Theatre. The show was billed as an intimate gig, and was described by the singer as a fusion of music, art and comedy. Titled Madonna: Tears of a Clown, it was created specifically for Australian fans.

== Development ==
=== Conception and rehearsals ===
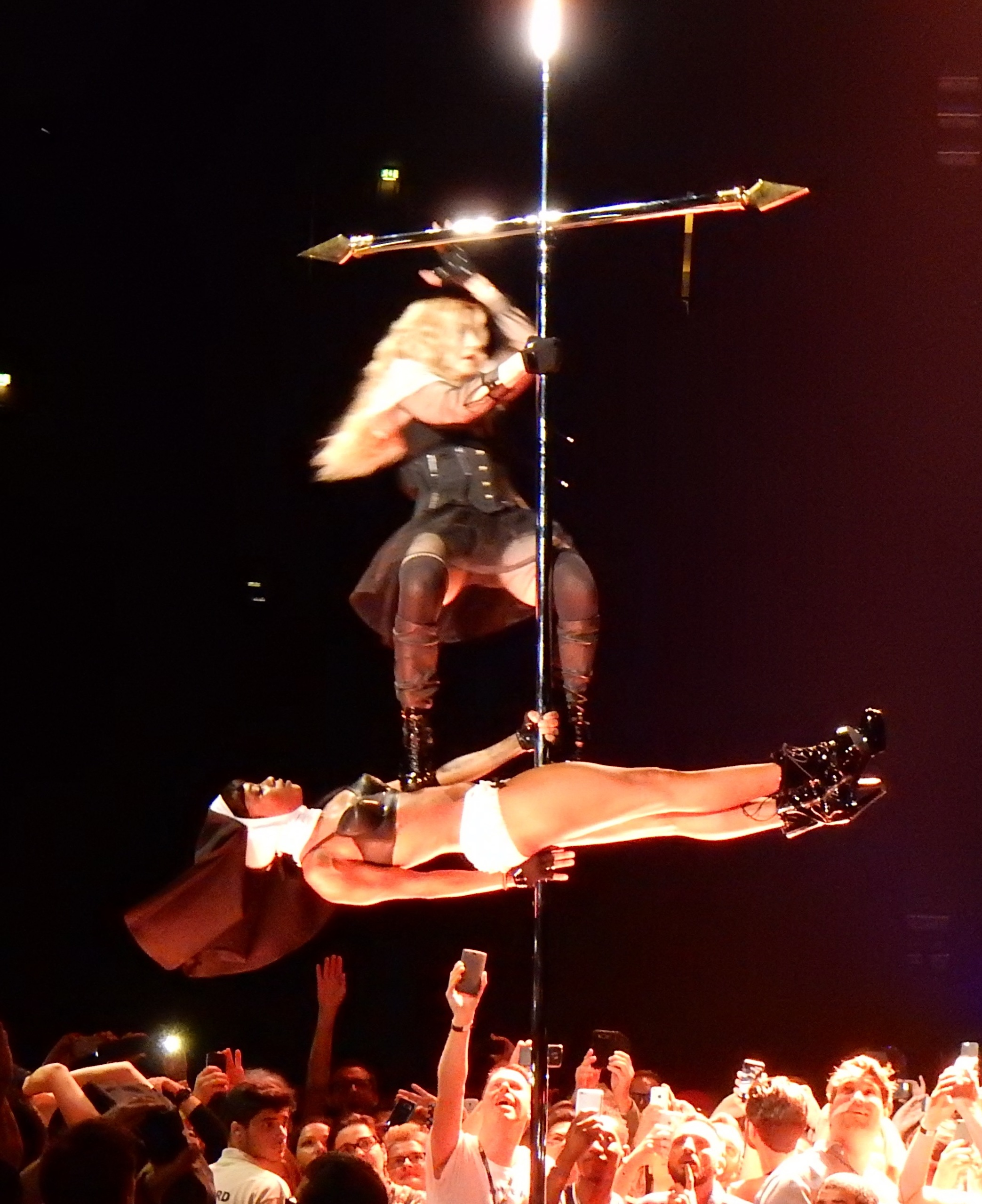
The Rebel Heart Tour consisted of intricate choreography. In the image, Madonna performing "Holy Water" on a cross, atop a dancer dressed as a nun.

While composing material for Rebel Heart, Madonna would get "fleeting moments of ideas" of what she would like to perform on the tour. After the promotional performances supporting the album, she had a concrete imagery about the themes she would like to incorporate. In March 2015 she clarified: "I like to create personas and then the persona changes and grows into other things... I'm at the beginning of that process right now, in terms of thinking of my tour and stuff". Rehearsals for the tour occurred for 10–12 hours per day. Madonna admitted liking the tour's rehearsals and creative process, noting her complete involvement in its development. Unlike the MDNA Tour (2012), Madonna confirmed that her son Rocco would not perform onstage, but would instead work behind the scenes of the tour.

By July 2015, Madonna was working on the set list with her team of creative directors, producers, designers and choreographers. She described the tour as "characteristically theatrical spectacle" included songs from her whole career. Madonna saw a challenge in alternating between material from Rebel Heart and her previous works, since "thematically the songs—the old and the new—they have to go together; sonically they have to go together". The concert was divided into four thematic segments, a custom for the singer: Joan of Arc/Samurai, Rockabilly Meets Tokyo, Latin/Gypsy and Party/Flapper. Its main theme was derived from the title Rebel Heart, and showcased the singer's personal statements and opinions, represented in the form of a journey. Love and romance were listed as the central themes of the show, with Madonna wanting the audience to feel inspired watching it. She juxtaposed opposite ideas of sexuality and religion, saying that "I'm very immersed in [how they are] not supposed to go together, but in my world it goes together". Inspirations for the Rebel Heart Tour came from shows like Cirque du Soleil and the Chinese New Year, as well as from films like 300 (2006) and Grease (1978). Jamie King was signed as the creative director for the show, while Megan Lawson and Jason Young choreographed the 20 dancers through intricate acrobatic dance steps. Since Madonna had started out as a dancer, she tried to find "unique and original dancers to work with" and create content and dance routines that would appeal to the audience.

French choreographer Sébastian Ramirez was hired from the auditions to select backup dancers for the show, which saw over 5,000 applicants in Paris, New York and Los Angeles. Madonna admired Ramirez's work and enlisted him to choreograph two songs for the show. Ramirez was surprised by the fast pace in which Madonna and her team generated and swapped ideas for the tour. Taking charge of the whole show, Madonna would explain an emotion behind a song and then entrust Ramirez and the other choreographers to come up with a routine.

Two short videos were released on the singer's Instagram account, showing the rehearsals taking place. As "Devil Pray" and "Iconic" from the album played, the videos showed flamenco-inspired choreography, nuns dancing on poles, and an elaborate set adorned with dancers carrying giant props. The singer continued releasing images and videos related to the tour, including dance rehearsal workshops. Madonna chose comedian Amy Schumer as the opening act for the New York shows, deviating from her usual hiring of a band or a disc jockey to open the shows. The singer thought of the idea since she believed Schumer was a role model for young women. Diplo, one of the producers of Rebel Heart, was hired as the opening act for the Montreal shows.

=== Stage and venue setup ===
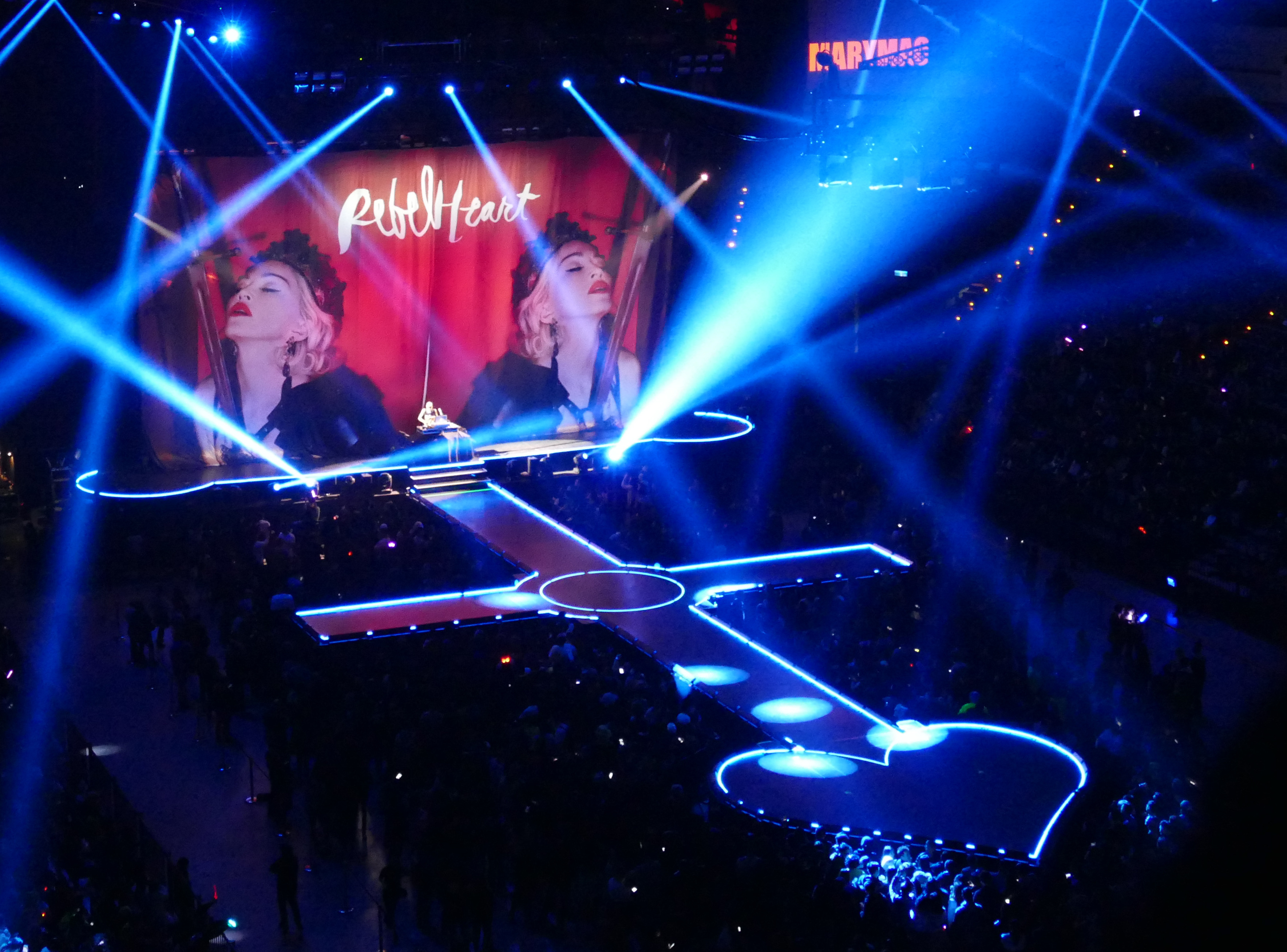
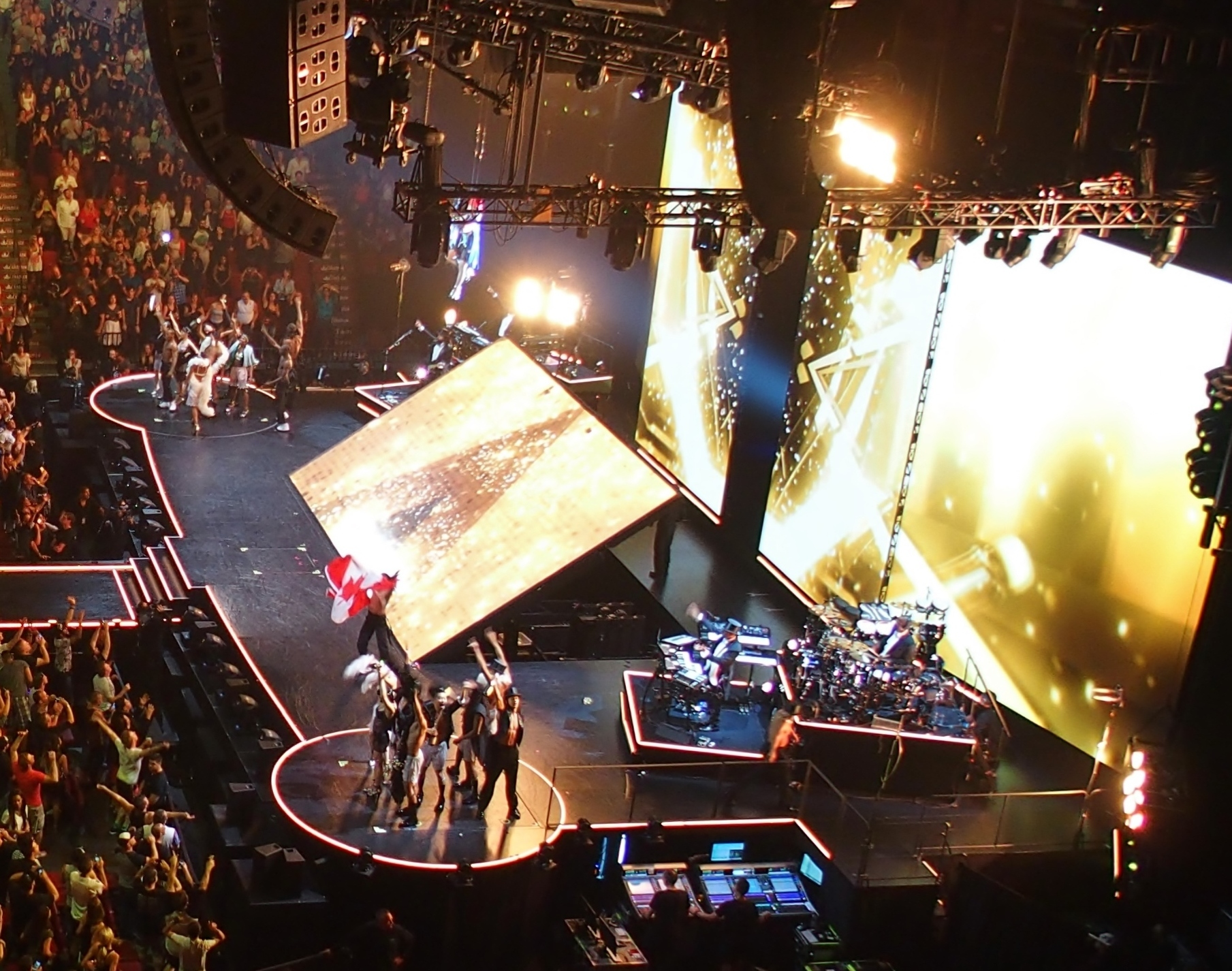
The stage had a long cross-shaped runway that ended in a heart-shaped B-stage (left), and a video screen that rose from the floor and where dancers could sway and slide from (right).

For the stage setup, creative and logistical design group Stufish were hired. They started brainstorming with Madonna and King in January 2015, after a 25-song set list has been created. The central theme of Rebel Heart was reproduced in the runway resembling an arrow or a cross, with the heart at its tip. Stufish, who had previously developed the structures for The MDNA Tour, were enlisted for Rebel Heart. The perpendicular structures emanating from the middle of the runway allowed Madonna and her dancers to reach more audience. Joking that the stage looked like a penis, Stufish architect Ric Lipson recalled Madonna saying: "hearts and penises are clearly very linked and this is God's way of setting [my] life in motion".

The large main stage was elevated and set up at the end of the arenas, with a long catwalk extending from its middle. The middle of the catwalk had a circular stage, while the pathway ended into a heart-shaped B-stage. In order to facilitate the entrance and exit of Madonna and her dancers, openings were created throughout the length of the stage, as well as causeways underneath it. Behind the main stage, three large video screens were placed, with the band and Madonna's two background vocalists in front of it. A number of barriers and encasing were supplied by Mojo Barriers to separate the stage from the audience and the production areas upfront. All barriers were supplied in black aluminium.

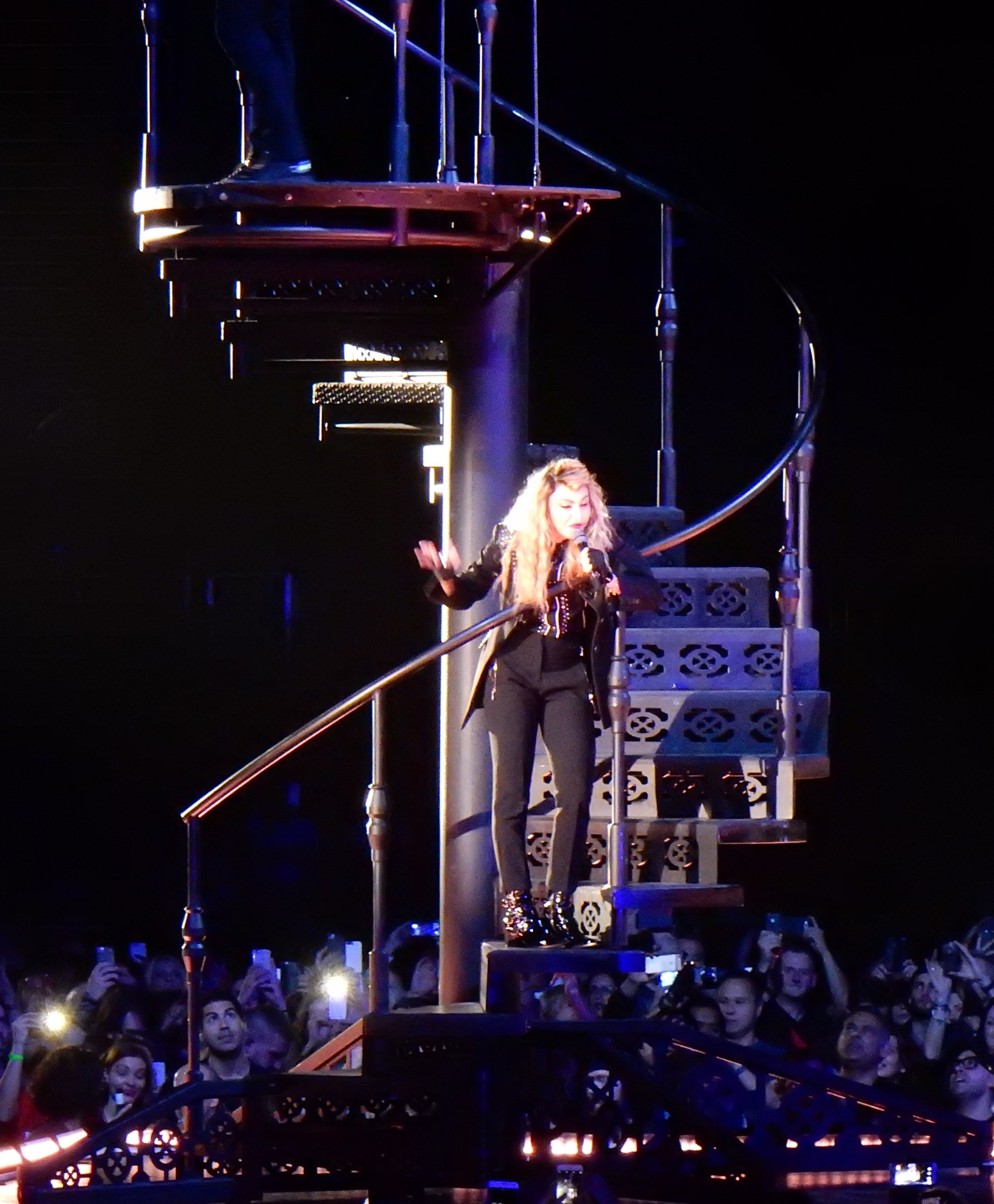
Madonna performing a mashup of "HeartBreakCity" and "Love Don't Live Here Anymore" standing on the steel spiral staircase.

A complex machine structure enabled the whole stage to become mobile and assume numerous shapes and sizes throughout the show. The structure had a 28 ft × 16 ft (8.5 m × 4.9 m) video screen that could change into the main stage floor. The same screen converted into an elevated 8 feet (2.4 m) platform of varying degrees within half-a-minute, or an angular wall for Madonna's dancers to sway from. Specially crafted bungee points were attached to the top edge of the machine, allowing performers to "flip, tumble, run and roll up and down the ramp". The screens showed the visuals created by Moment Factory and Veneno Inc. Another prop was a 16 ft × 8 ft (4.9 m × 2.4 m) steel spiral staircase which was hidden from the audience initially. Lipson explained that it was created out of a single block of steel. Although it was not recommended to use the steel because of its heavy weight and enormity, Madonna wanted it since she had found the sturdiness useful during rehearsals. Simpler props designed by Stufish included a table used during the performance of "Vogue", which was 23 feet (7.0 m) long and had flickering 4.4 feet (1.3 m) tall candelabras at each end. A set of crosses for the dancing nuns were designed to support both Madonna and a dancer on it. They were finalized from 17 different prototypes, and were fastened with links, allowing the dancers to know which way they would swivel.

Tom Banks from Design Week magazine visited the area underneath the stage which was about 6 feet (1.8 m) tall. There the dancers changed, props were handed out and performers reached the main stage often through numerous hydraulic lifts. Banks further described the space as a "subterranean area, which is the footprint beneath the stage rather than back-stage. It's a maze of tunnels, wires and props interrupted only by platforms poised to send performers up into the light". Madonna sat on a trolley which transported her from one end to the other end of the stage. She had a temporary make-up room in the underneath area, for touch-ups in between performances. In total, the stage and the equipment required 27 semitrailers and 187 staff member to transport across Europe and North America. For the Oceania shows, three Boeing 747 airliners were hired. The singer flew to each location in her private jet, turning up at the venue in mid-afternoon for rehearsals, sound and safety checks. A leisure area was also enclosed backstage, with hospitality and catering areas. Madonna's dressing room consisted of furniture, pictures and gym equipment, along with several flowers. The singer explained to Nolan Feeney from Entertainment Weekly that every show felt like a battle to her since there was a lot of hustling backstage.

Everyone has to be super organized and vigilant. There’s no room for error. There are 30 seconds to change. You’re passing people under the stage, there are lifts going up and down. There’s a lot of dangerous stuff happening, and you have to fight through all of that and fight your fatigue or whatever personal issues you might be having that evening and get out there. It’s showtime! No matter what’s going on, you have to push through it and be a warrior.

=== Costume design ===
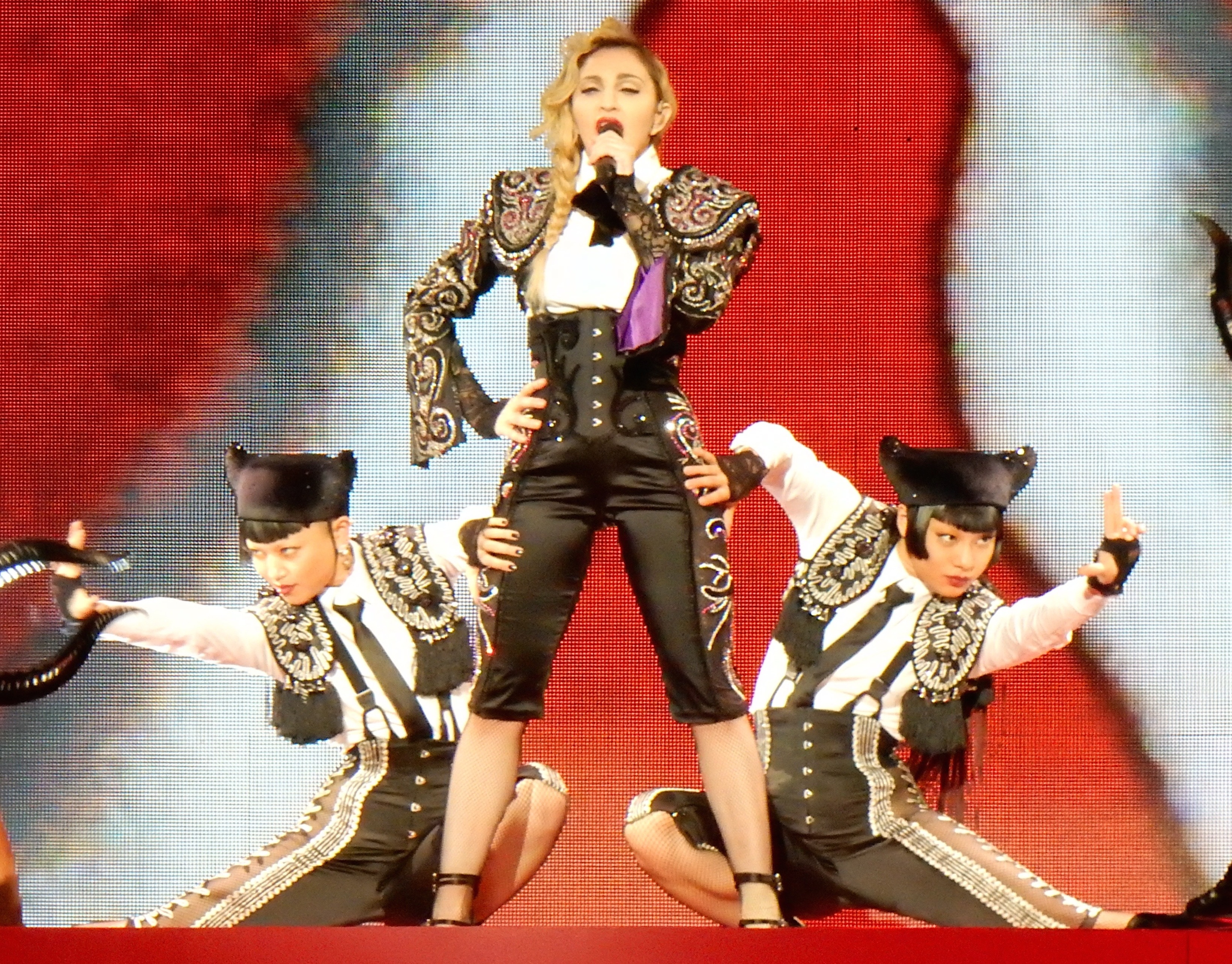
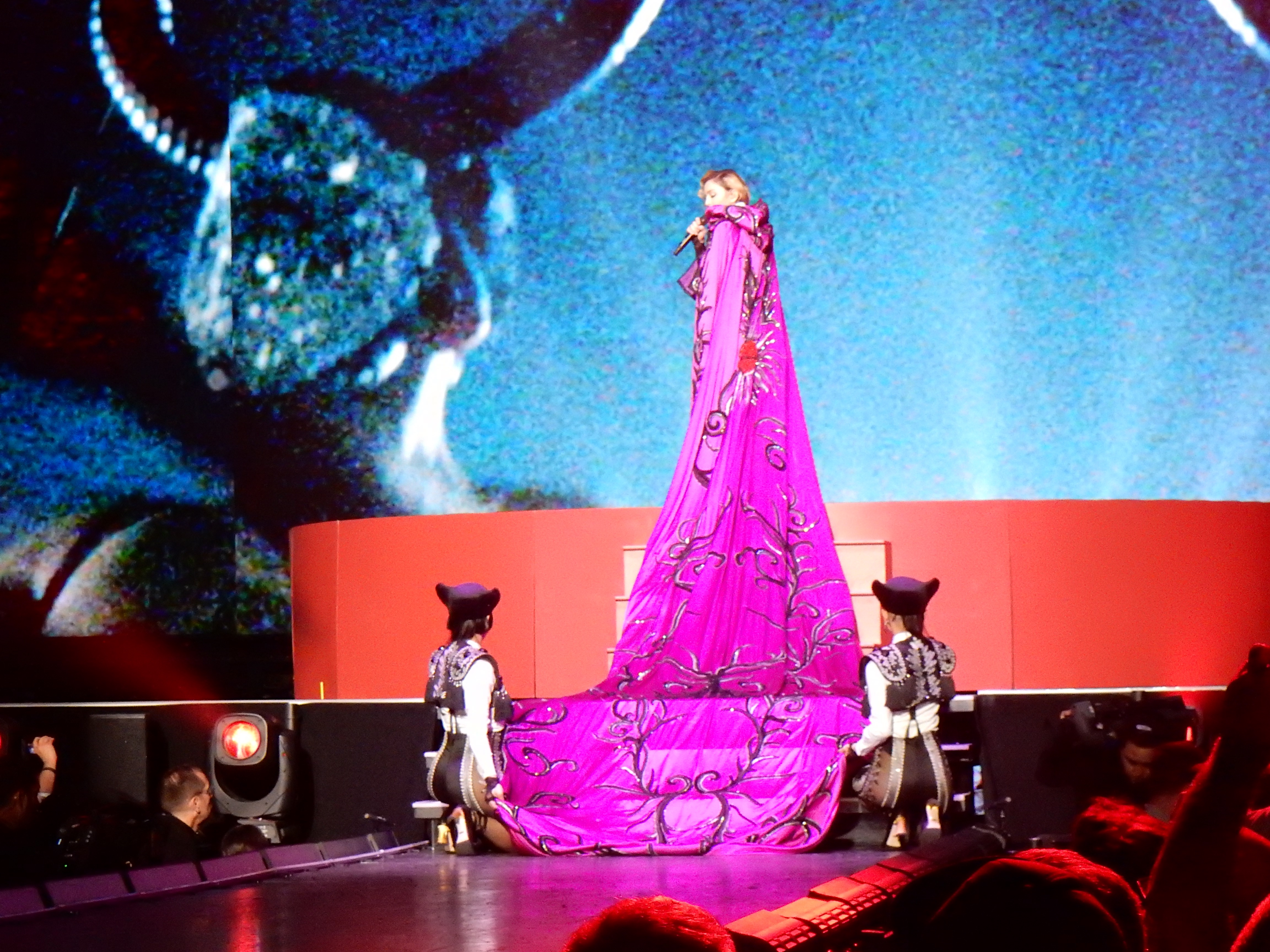
Costumes created for the Rebel Heart Tour included a custom-made traje de luces (left) and cape (right) from Zaragoza, which were worn for the performance of "Living for Love".

Madonna had enlisted a Spanish tailoring company from Zaragoza for creating two bullfighter traje de luces costumes, along with a cape and matador-related costumes for her backing dancers. The tailoring company had to sign a confidentiality agreement about the costumes. They also made several adjustments to the traditional designs, such as replacing the imagery of Jesus or Mary with that of a capital 'M'. According to the company's manager Alfredo Roqueta, the suits were created in 12 days. Madonna and her dancers did not go for trials and sent their measurements through e-mail. PETA representatives condemned the outfits, criticizing the singer for "glorifying gore". In August 2015, Madonna revealed the name of the designers working on the costumes for the tour to Women's Wear Daily; these include Jeremy Scott for Moschino, Alessandro Michele for Gucci and Alexander Wang, along with Fausto Puglisi, Prada, Miu Miu, Swarovski, and Lebanese designer Nicolas Jebran. Together with her longtime costume designer Arianne Phillips, Madonna showed snippets of the costumes on her Instagram. Additional designers included Geoffrey Mac, Lynn Ban, and Majesty Black.

During a show, Madonna changed into eight different looks. She was accompanied by 28 performers, and had ten costume changes for 20 dancers, six for the background singers and four for the band. Phillips had been working "on-and-off" on the tour since December 2014. She had first heard of Michele in February 2015 through British fashion critic Suzy Menkes. Phillips contacted Gucci for designing costumes for the tour but it was not until April 2015 that the set list and the show's structure was finalized, which set off the creation of the costumes. Michele's designs consisted of a mix of chinoiserie style skirts with Spanish and Latin influences, portraying the singer as a "diva of the 1920s". Other costumes were described by Menkes as "an exotic, dancing Frida Kahlo with ruffles, color, and a different kind of aesthetic". Michele met Madonna while she was rehearsing in Manhattan and tried on the initial designs. Michele incorporated the singer's review comments and worked in his office for crafting the final costumes.

For the first section, inspired by the album cover art and Joan of Arc, Phillips created a series of costumes with liturgical fabrics. She further took inspiration from a contemporary exhibition of samurai armor at the Los Angeles County Museum of Art. Miuccia Prada created the costumes for the second section, based on rock-n-roll and taking influences from Japanese street fashion. During the Latin influenced third section, Puglisi and Jebran crafted the matador-inspired costumes portrayed in the music video of the album's first single, "Living for Love". They used black tulle netting on the pants and paired the dress with a transparent side-paneling, coupling it with a black and fuchsia-colored jacket embellished with the letter 'M' in Swarovski crystals. Another design by Michele had Madonna wearing a shawl, flamenco hat, lace, skirts and a jacquard bodysuit. Phillips was impressed with the dress, saying that she was "completely blown away. I love [Michele's] hand. His clothes are lyrical and feminine and they tell stories." For the final section, Madonna worked with Scott and came up with a "Harlem-flapper-meets-Paris-in-the-Twenties" look. Scott created the final dress adorned with thousands of Swarovski crystals and long fringed gloves, for songs like "Material Girl".

Two weeks prior to the opening night, the designing team moved to the rehearsal location at Nassau Coliseum in Long Island. Wang had to make alterations to the dresses due to last minute changes in production, adding that for Madonna "the performance comes first. She has to be able to dance and move and feel comfortable in it". A week later Michele had the final fittings for the Gucci costumes. Phillips explained that until the song performances and the choreography was fully finalized, Madonna did not give a final sign off on the costumes or the designs.

=== Multimedia and videos ===
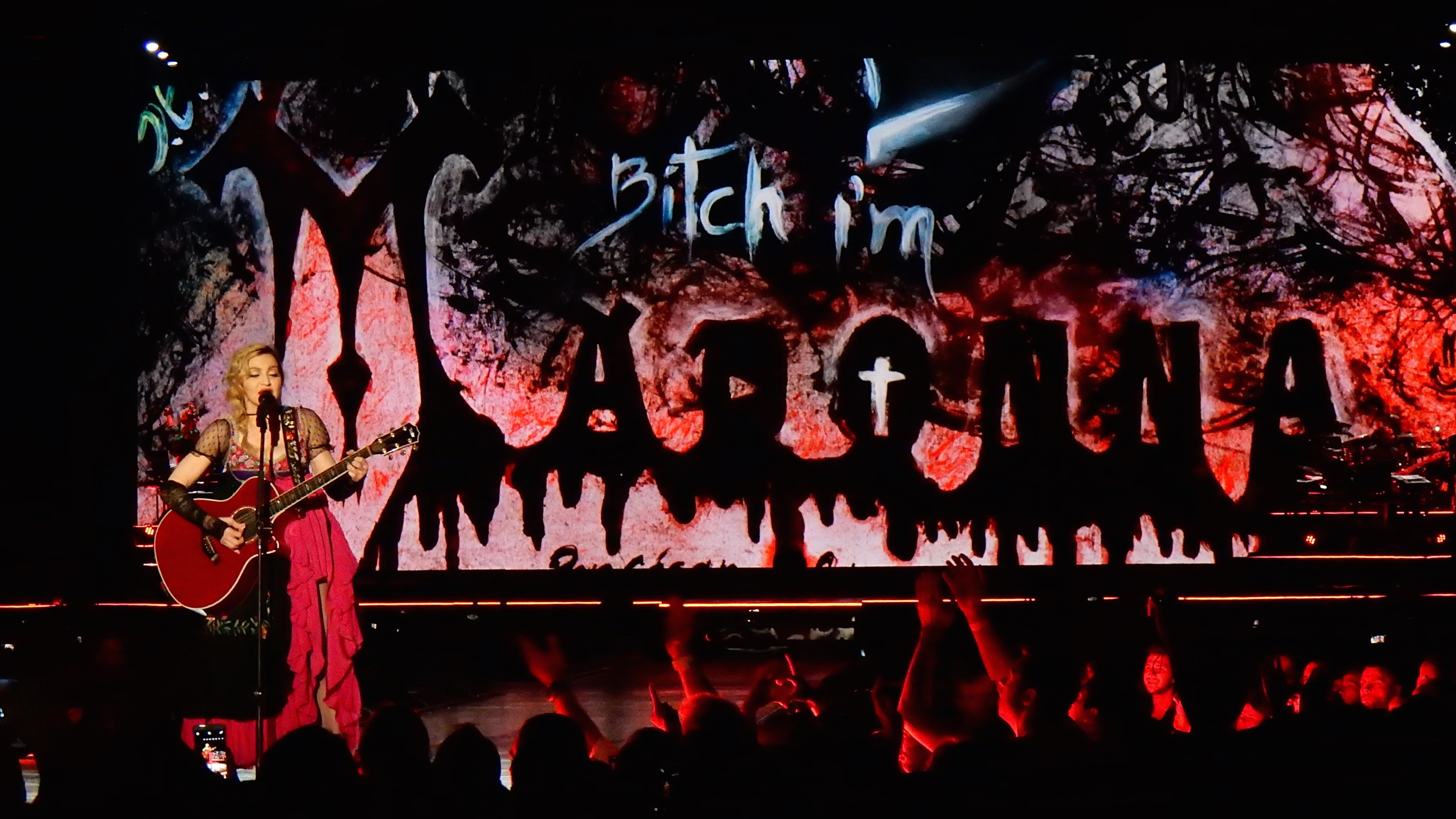
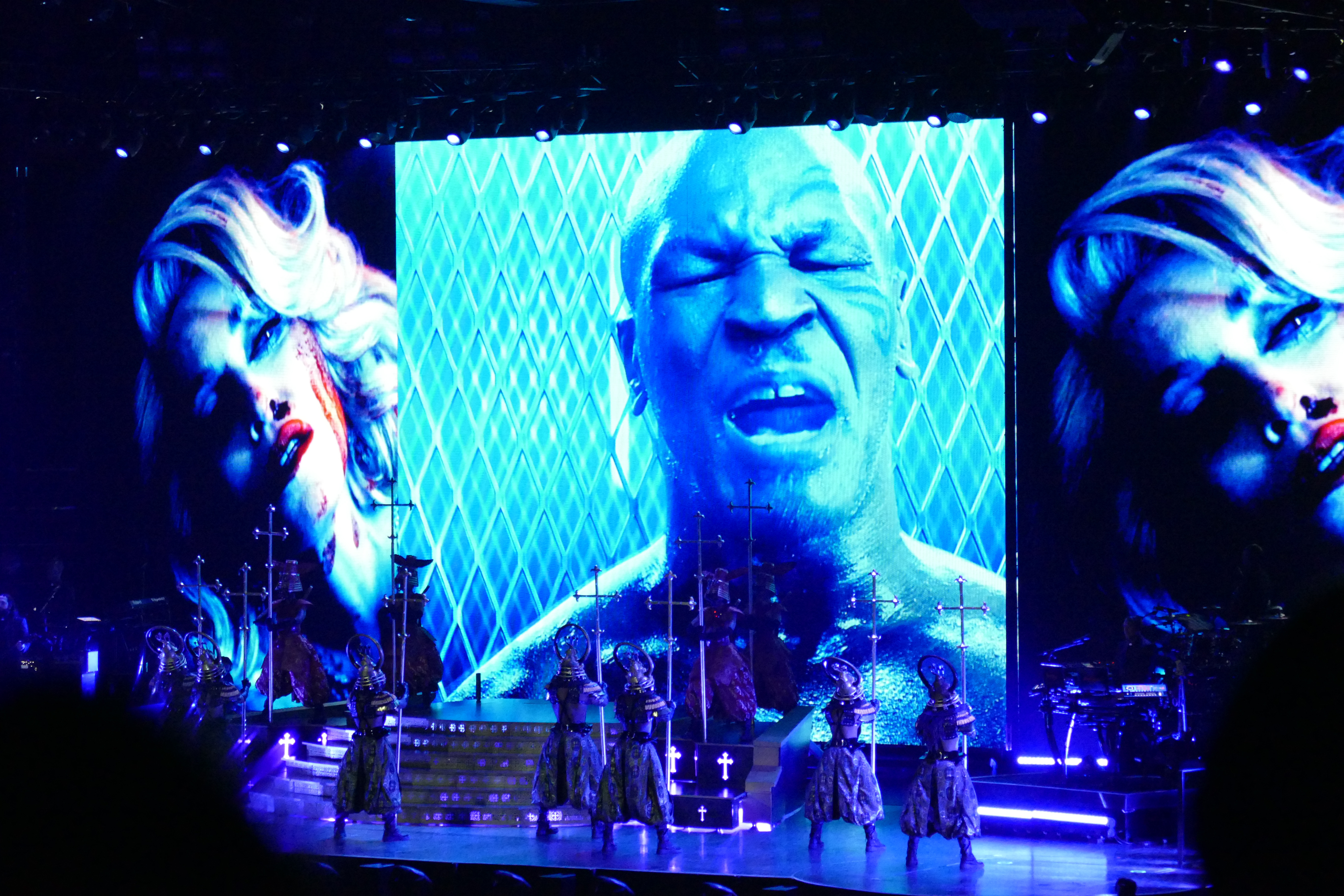
The fan artwork shown during the performance of "Rebel Heart" (top) and Mike Tyson's appearance during the opening video (bottom).

Montreal-based multimedia company Moment Factory were enlisted, this being their third collaboration with Madonna, following the Super Bowl XLVI halftime show and the MDNA Tour. They worked closely with King and Madonna to develop new backdrops, designing and producing the videos for the show. The three large video screens were used for achieving the theatrical effect of the visuals on a large scale. The opening video was filmed with boxer Mike Tyson, who appears as a guest vocalist on album track "Iconic". He felt that the video might be received negatively since the visuals showed him as a savage character, naked and held hostage in a cage. A clip of the video was previewed by the singer before the tour started, showing her pushing against the cage, embracing a shirtless man and a troupe of soldiers walking with insignia.

British director Danny Tull was signed for the tour backdrops. Tull, who had collaborated with Madonna since 2006's Confessions Tour, explained that the singer was a "detail-oriented person" and every scene in the backdrops had a creative meaning behind it. The first video showed themes including confinement, love, sex and violence among others, which changed in the backdrop for "Bitch I'm Madonna", where Tull wanted to create abstract imagery, superfluous color and dancing elements. The visual for "Devil Pray" showed drug intake, snakes, churches and crosses, interspersed with scenes of baptism and religious proceedings. In order to create the videos, Tull and his team discussed with Madonna at night since she was busy with rehearsals throughout the day. They aligned on the source of the images, any permission if required, usage of stock footage or creation of new graphics. The idea of using fan artwork during the performance of "Rebel Heart" emerged from this thought. Madonna's official website unveiled a contest where fans submitted their artwork related to the singer, with them displayed as a live digital gallery during the performance of "Rebel Heart". Several layering and rendering was done for most of the videos. Different multimedia software were used to create the clips, including Adobe Premiere Pro, After Effects, Avid, as well as Final Cut Pro. For Tull, the challenge was to adapt each software based on the different videos they would create, including last minute changes and tweaks.

=== Light and sound ===
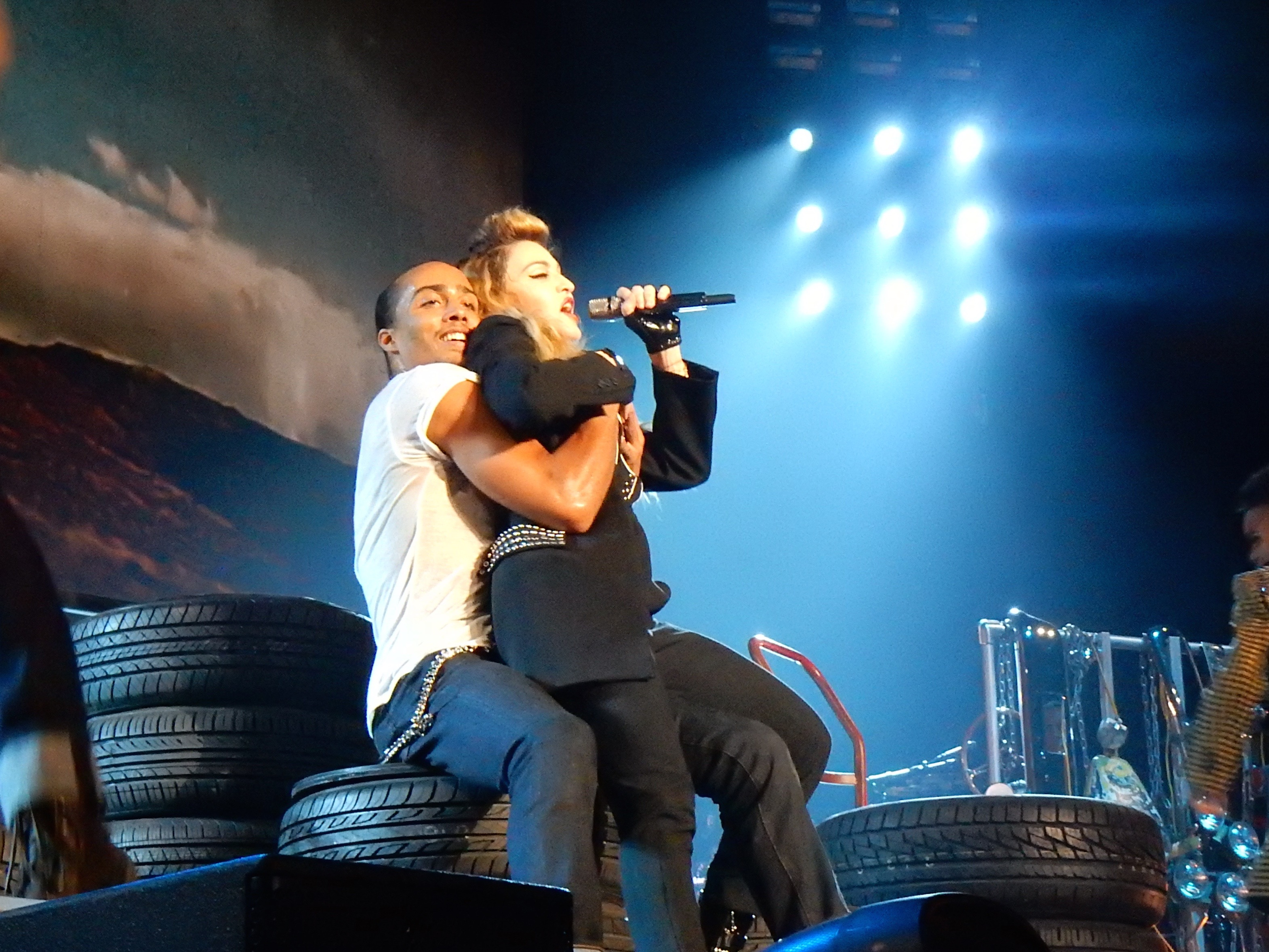
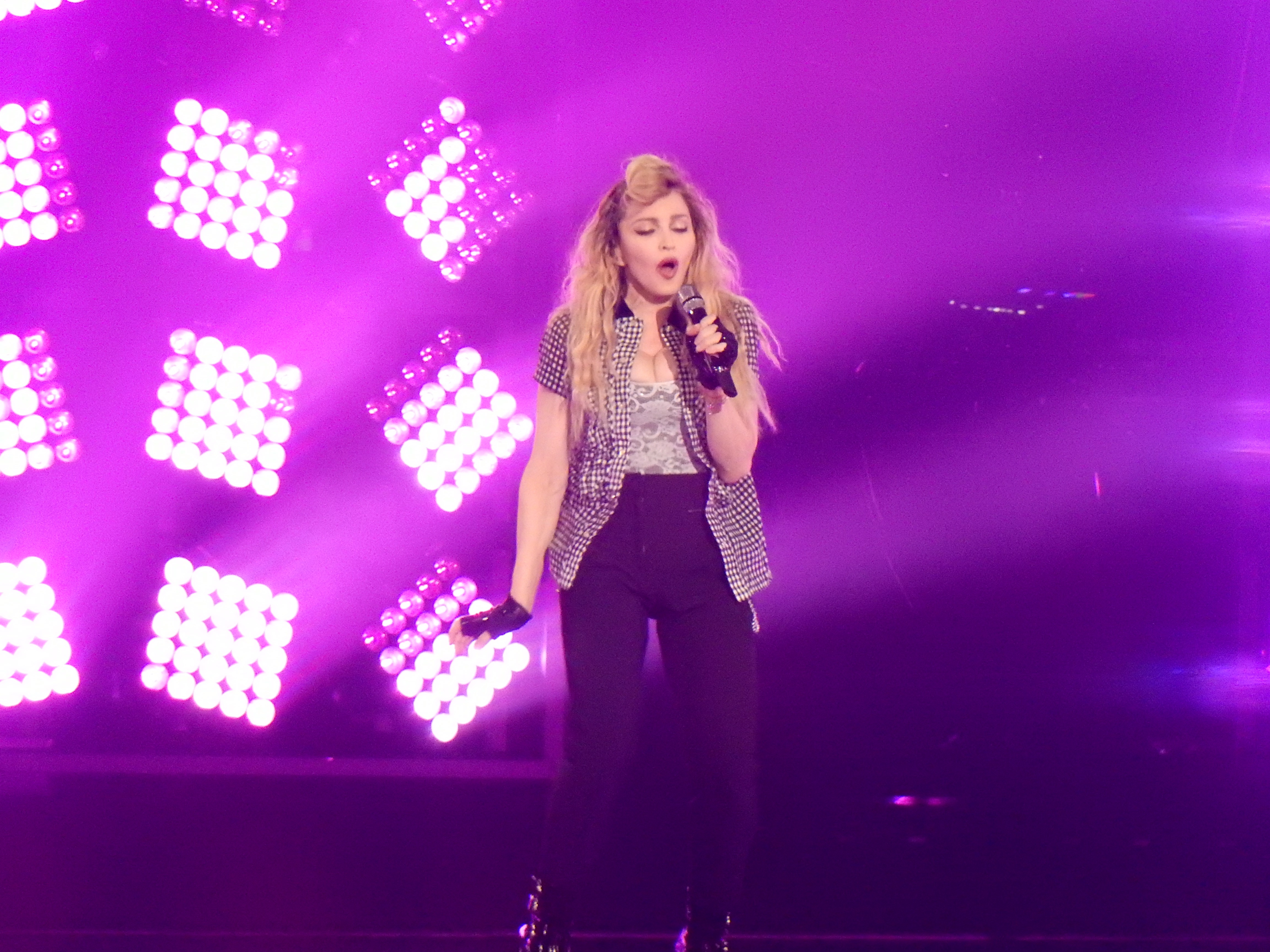
The Clay Paky strobes illuminating the stage as Madonna performs "Body Shop" (left) and "Like a Virgin" (right).

Lighting designer Al Gurdon worked with Stufish and Tait Towers for the light setup, which was handled by PRG Group. The three main video screens were placed in an angular way, to facilitate a better vision for audiences sitting on the side areas. A Hippotizer V3 media server was used for content playback and was operated by PRG Nocturne's Will Stinson. They used their newly invented GroundControl followspot devices which were attached as a truss to the top of the screens, using Clay Paky Stormy Strobes. Fitted with high-definition cameras, they were operated from backstage, and the relevant personnel could simply use the cameras and direct the lights to illuminate specific areas. Console director Joshua Hutchings controlled their color, beams and shutters. Advantage of the followspot was to allow the lighting personnel to operate from a comfortable environment, rather than climb on heightened areas atop the stage. Hutchings explained the whole show was time-coded and inline with the choreography.

For the audio engineering on the tour, DiGiCo SD7 consoles were used by sound mixing specialist Andy Meyer, and monitor engineers Matt Napier and Sean Spuehler. Since Madonna wanted her vocals to sound live, Spuehler mixed her singing with effects and then added it to the house consoles for transmitting to the loudspeakers. During the show, the singer ventured into the middle of the audience at the end of the catwalk, resulting in the spill of her microphone constantly changing. The sound crew employed time-codes like the lighting and the choreography, thus the sound feed also changed depending on where the singer was onstage. All the musicians accompanying Madonna wore in-ear monitors. Additional monitors were used for musical director and keyboardist Kevin Antunes, a thumper for drummer Brian Frasier-Moore and sidefills for the dancers. All the inputs from the different personnel, including Madonna, were fed into the SD7 console. A Multichannel Audio Digital Interface (MADI) was used to record all the shows to a digital audio workstation in RAID drives. They were archived into 4TB hard disks.

== Concert synopsis ==
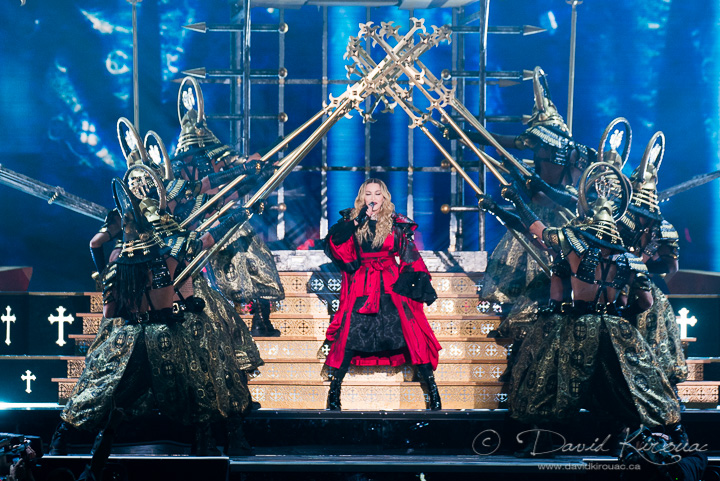
"Iconic" was performed as the tour's opening number.

The first segment, Joan of Arc/Samurai, began with a video showing Madonna in a gown, cavorting with bare-bodied males, and juxtaposed with Mike Tyson talking inside of a cage. Ten dancers dressed in samurai outfit of gold and black came out onto the catwalk carrying large gold pikes, as Madonna descended to the stage encased in a steel cage to sing "Iconic". The show continued with "Bitch I'm Madonna", which included four female dancers dressed as geishas and male dancers engaged in mock martial arts. Rapper Nicki Minaj appeared on the video screens. The singer then played "Burning Up" on a Gibson Flying V electric guitar, while moving to the center stage. During "Holy Water", the female dancers were dressed as nuns and danced on 20-feet cross-like poles; halfway through the performance, Madonna climbed onto one of the poles and sang a fragment of "Vogue". She then performed the rest of "Holy Water" with pictures of the Apostles on the video screens, followed by a reenactment of the Last Supper. "Devil Pray" saw Madonna appearing to subdue the male dancers before disappearing backstage.

During the first video interlude, dancers appeared onstage waving large white cloths in front of fans. The album track "Messiah" played as scenes from the "Ghosttown" music video were shown on the screens. The next segment, Rockabilly Meets Tokyo, started with "Body Shop", where Madonna sang the song, alongside dancers dressed as mechanics, in front of a 1965 Ford Falcon. She then played the ukulele for an acoustic version of "True Blue" followed by a disco version of "Deeper and Deeper", which was sung at end of the catwalk. A spiral staircase descended from the ceiling for a mashup of "HeartBreakCity" and "Love Don't Live Here Anymore", where a male dancer followed Madonna up and down the stairs before she pushed him off from the top. She closed the section with a remix of "Like a Virgin", performed in front of fans placed around the catwalk.

The second video interlude began with a mashup of "S.E.X." and "Justify My Love", where eight dancers enacted sexual positions on four beds as an edited version of the "Erotica" music video played on the backdrops. The third section, Latin/Gypsy, began with "Living for Love", with Madonna dressed as a bullfighter, before moving into a flamenco version of "La Isla Bonita". After a quick costume change, Madonna returned to the stage accompanied by dancers in colorful Mexican outfits. A slow, cumbia and salsa-fueled medley of "Dress You Up", "Into the Groove" and "Lucky Star" was performed, with the pace slowing down for an acoustic version of "Who's That Girl". The album's title track closed the segment with Madonna playing the guitar and fan art submitted to the singer shown on the video screens.

During the final interlude, "Illuminati", seven dancers climbed 20-feet poles and began swaying back and forth over the audience. The fourth segment, Party/Flapper, saw the singer and her dancers returning to the stage in 1920s-inspired costumes and performed a mashup of "Music", "Give It 2 Me", and "Candy Shop". The performance of "Material Girl" found Madonna pushing her tuxedo clad dancers down an incline; the number ended with the singer walking down the catwalk in a bridal veil and carrying a white bouquet, which she eventually threw to the audience. She played the ukulele once again for "La Vie en rose" and ended the main set with "Unapologetic Bitch", where she invited someone from the audience, terming the person with the titular name, and gifting them with a banana. The show ended with "Holiday", where Madonna came out wrapped in the flag of the country she performed in, while dancing around the stage as confetti dropped from the ceiling. At the end of the performance, she was strapped into a harness and flew above the stage, before disappearing behind the video screens.

== Commercial reception ==
=== Ticket sales ===
Rebel Heart was Madonna's third and final tour under the ten year multi-rights deal with Live Nation, signed in 2007 for $120 million. General sales for the tour started from March 9, 2015, and the North American tickets purchased online were bundled with an exclusive digital download of Rebel Heart. Special access was granted to members of Madonna's fan club known as Icon, including first access to tickets and VIP passes. Citi was listed as the official bank for the tour, with cardholders having the ability to buy tickets early. Prices were almost identical as Madonna's last few tours, with the top price in the $300–$350 range, and the cheapest being at $35. However, tickets for her Manila performances were above the average price and ranged from $70 (₱3,145) to $1,300 (₱57,750).

According to Jesse Lawrence from Forbes, initial prices in the secondary markets indicated that the tour would become the most expensive concert tour of 2015. The average ticket for was valued at $452.33 in Madonna's secondary markets, a much higher total than Taylor Swift's 1989 World Tour, whose tickets were average priced at $305.21. Madonna surpassed Fleetwood Mac as the artist with the most expensive tour (51.5% more) in 2015. The show of October 24 in Las Vegas became the most expensive date with an average price of $949.21, while the cheapest tickets were available for $164.30 at the Edmonton date, according to Viagogo. Lawrence also noted that the secondary market prices were much higher than those of The MDNA Tour, indicating a competitive scenario favorable towards Madonna.

Tickets for the shows started selling out rapidly; cities like Edmonton, Paris and Turin sold out within minutes of being available, resulting in the addition of second shows there. Live Nation partnered with gay geosocial networking app Grindr, and posted advertisements there promoting the tour, which resulted in further ticket sales. For the Australian dates, the Telstra pre-sale resulted in all the cheaper tickets getting sold early, with only the VIP packages and the costlier ones left. Madonna's fan club members were given the first priority to buy the Australian tickets. It was followed by Citibank card holders, Telstra presale, Live Nation members, and ultimately general public tickets from July 6, 2015. Tickets for the singer's first ever concert in Taiwan sold out in 15 minutes, prompting a second date to be added. In Hong Kong, tickets sold out within ten minutes of being available, setting up a record for the fastest-selling concert there; second dates were added on February 18 at the same venue.

=== Boxscore ===
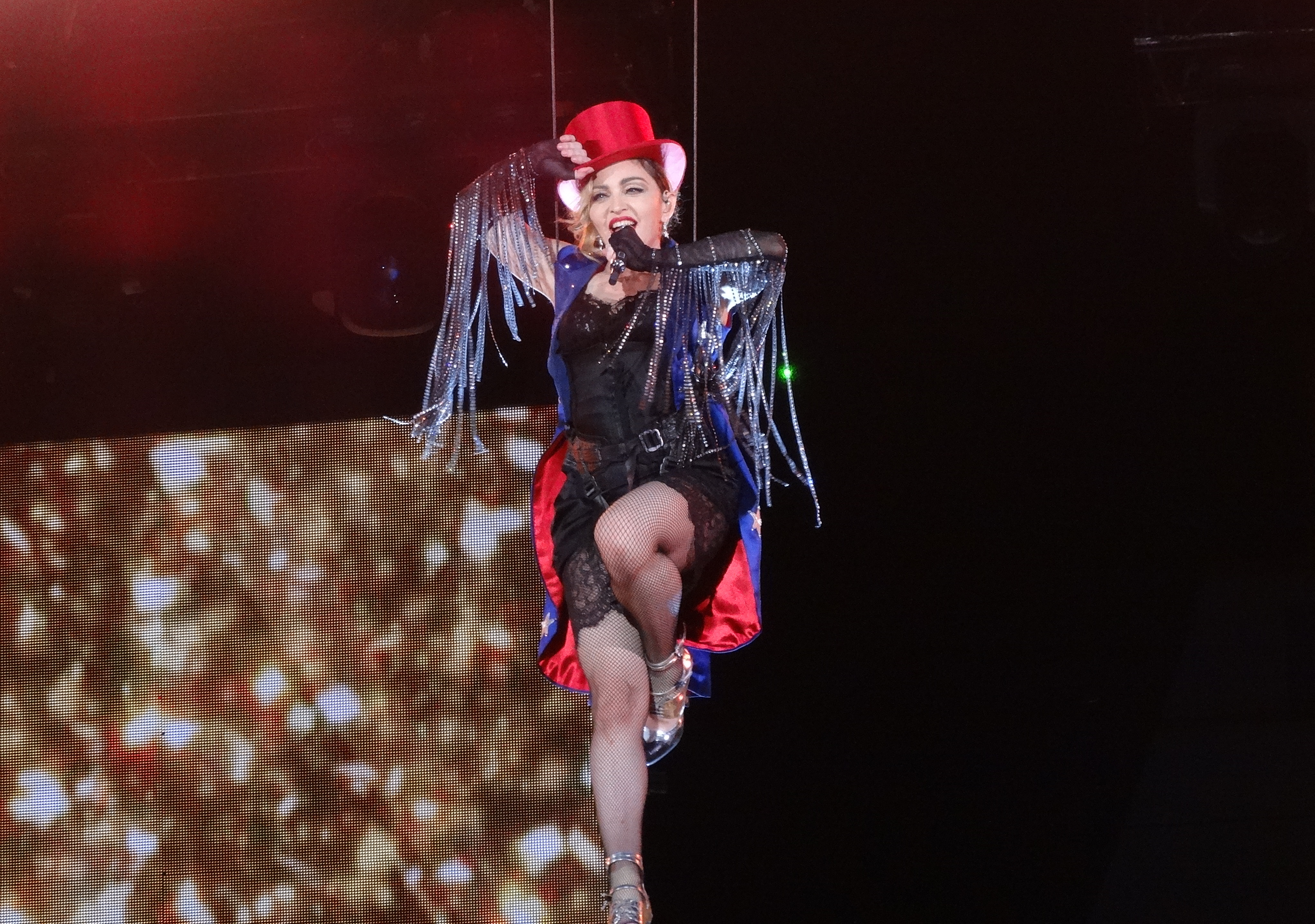
With the Rebel Heart Tour, Madonna extended her record as the highest-grossing solo touring artist. In the image, the artist performs "Holiday", the concert's encore, in Taipei.

A news report in the New York Post claimed that the tour's sales would be inferior to those of the MDNA Tour, with venues including New York still having tickets available after the first day. Fogel dismissed the report, explaining that "[a] tour with a budget like [Madonna's] counts on adding on second and third nights in markets... That's why it's scheduled with lots of empty dates in major markets." Writing for Forbes, Lawrence criticized such news, saying that "Madonna is posting some of the most expensive ticket prices on the secondary market this year... And though media will continue to speculate that Madonna is nearing the end of her renowned career, her box office numbers have shown that she is still among the upper echelon of pop music's elite."

In October 2015, Billboard announced the first boxscores for the tour, reporting the first ten dates. Total gross was $20 million with 132,769 tickets sold. The opening shows in Montreal were considered a highlight with a total gross of $3.4 million. The highest gross came from shows in New York, earning $5.2 million from a total audience of 28,371. The second set of boxscores were published in November 2015, and the tour grossed another $25.4 million. The first leg of the tour had an attendance of over 300,000 with $46 million in gross. Among the arenas where Madonna performed for a single date, the MGM Grand Garden in Las Vegas had the maximum gross of $3.5 million, earned on October 24. Brooklyn's Barclays Center had the highest audience of 14,258 among the single-show dates.

With the European leg starting, Swedish newspaper Svenska Dagbladet reported that the concert at Stockholm's Tele 2 Arena drew a total of 40,557 in audience, making it a new record for the venue. In December 2015, the fourth boxscore figures were reported with a total gross of $22.6 million from eight markets and a total of 194,827 tickets sold. Billboard also clarified the actual tickets sold in Sweden to be at 39,338. Another $7.5 million was reported from the shows in Zurich, Manchester, Birmingham and Glasgow. At the end of 2015, the tour was placed at number 11 on Pollstar's "2015 Year-End Top 100 Worldwide Tours" list, grossing $88.4 million from 49 shows with a total attendance of 693,061.

The North American boxscores for the 2016 shows were published in March 2016, with total tickets sold increasing to 819,792 and a gross of $107.3 million. After the tour ended, Billboard announced the final gross at $169.8 million with a total of 1,045,479 tickets sold. In Pollstar's 2016 Mid Year Special Features, the tour was ranked at number four, grossing $85.5 million from 33 shows with a total attendance of 395,815. Upon Rebel Heart's completion, Madonna extended her record as the highest-grossing solo touring artist, with over $1.31 billion in concert gross, starting from the Blond Ambition World Tour in 1990. Overall, Madonna is ranked third on the all-time top-grossing Billboard Boxscore list, behind the Rolling Stones ($1.84 billion) and U2 ($1.67 billion).

== Critical response ==
=== North America ===
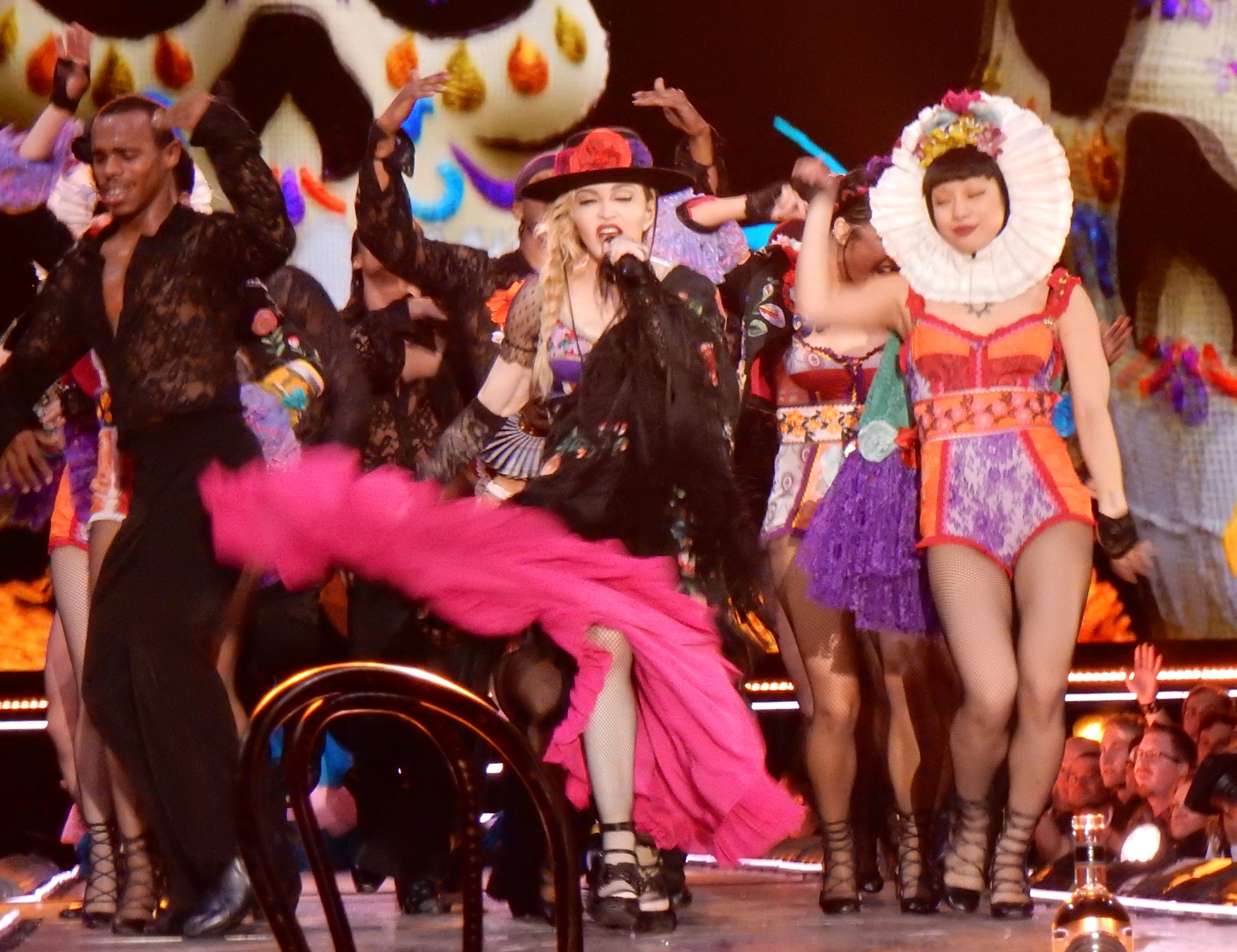
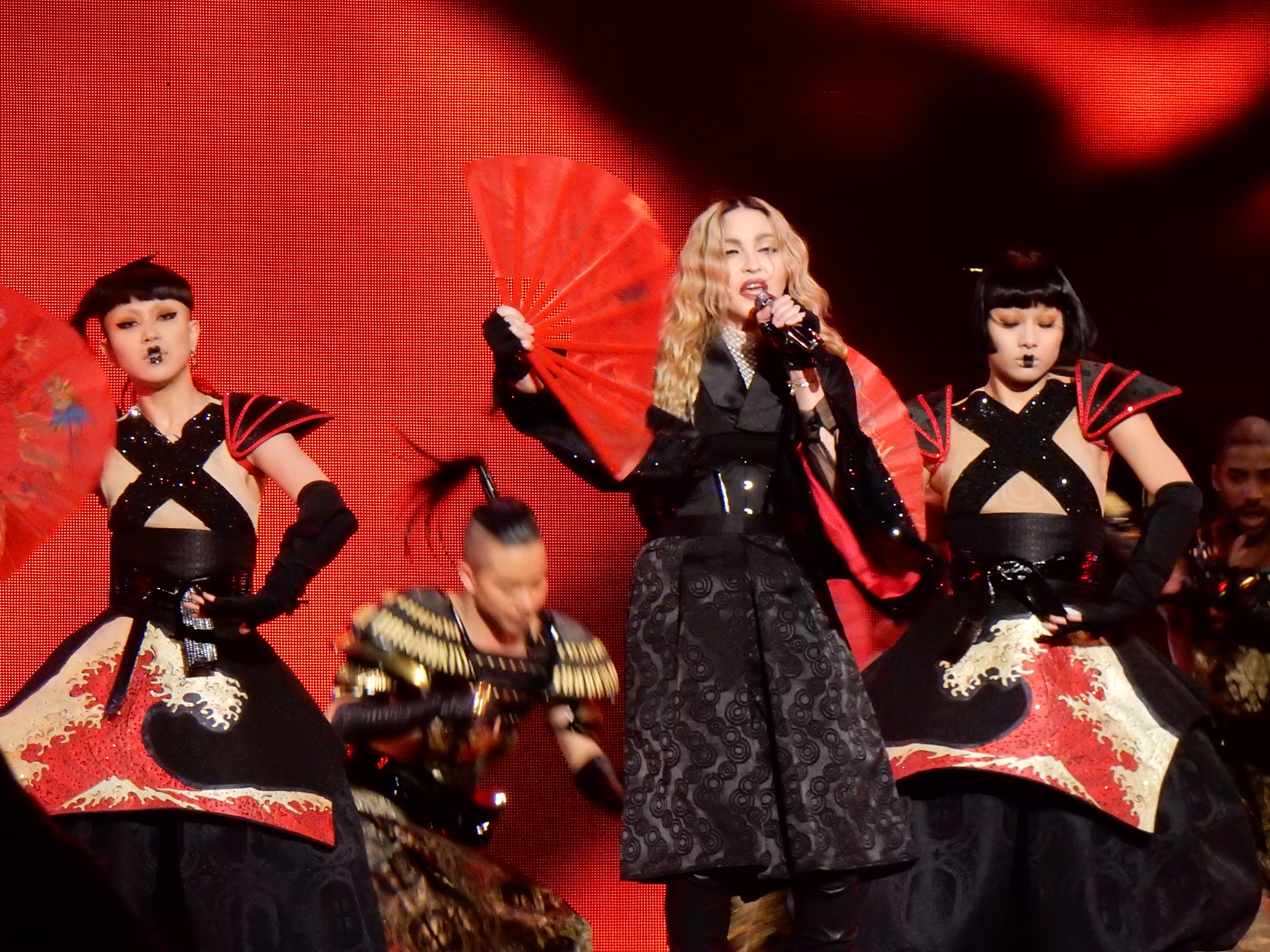
Performances such as "Dress You Up" (left) and "Bitch I'm Madonna" (right) were singled out for praise.

Writing for the New York Daily News, Jim Farber noted that the most shocking aspect of the tour was not the provocative imagery and performances, but that Madonna appeared in a light mood and was smiling all throughout. This thought was echoed by Jordan Zivitz of Montreal Gazette who observed that after the first section, the tour's tone became more carefree since Madonna seemed to be "enjoying herself". She complimented the performance of "La Vie en rose" and ended the review saying that "the show shared a sense of self-confidence and a sense of play". Chris Kelly from The Washington Post reviewed the show at Verizon Center, saying that Madonna remained "as provocative as ever... The moment [her] show started... [questions like 'After three decades in the spotlight, does Madonna still have it?'] went out the window".

Alex Needham from The Guardian rated the Madison Square Garden concert as five out of five stars, complimenting the performance of the old songs and describing the concert as "an affirmation that there is simply no other performer like her. Tonight, Madonna kills it". In a positive review written in The Village Voice, Hillary Hughes called Madonna "the pop's patron saint of revolution in action". Rob Sheffield from Rolling Stone complimented Madonna's camaraderie during the show saying, "She hasn't reached so far onstage, musically or emotionally, since her 2001 Drowned World extravaganza." Joe Gottlieb from The Boston Herald theorized that "Madonna's visions have a smart, thought-out feel her imitators can't replicate".

Billboard's Joe Lynch rated the concert four stars out of five, observing that "Madonna's restless creative spirit is on full display on the Rebel Heart Tour". He praised Schumer's opening act and the performances of "Music", the "Dress You Up" medley and "Body Shop". Jon Pareles wrote in The New York Times that "[t]hrough the decades, Madonna's tours have delivered spectacles that push hot buttons galore". However, with Rebel Heart, Pareles observed Madonna doing what she felt like, rather than being controversial. The reviewer also complimented the remix of her past hits. Ashley Lee from The Hollywood Reporter gave a similar feedback, saying that the singer "[showcased] her years of creative vision and onstage expertise to deliver an arena show packed with visual variety, thematic theatrics and inventive instrumentation to refresh even her earliest hits". Giving the concert a rating of B+, Melissa Maerz from Entertainment Weekly was surprised by Madonna's "playful" mood during the show, since she felt that the opening sequence was reminiscent of the darker intones during the MDNA Tour. In a review for New York magazine, Lindsay Zolatz commended the show, the dancers during "Illuminati", but criticized the excessive inclusion of Rebel Heart songs in the set list.

=== Europe, Asia and Oceania ===
German newspaper Volksstimme reviewed the show in Cologne and described it as a "Madonna-show in miniature", noting that the "classic" hits got the greatest acclaim from the audience. Anders Nunstedt from Swedish newspaper Expressen attended the show in Stockholm and called it as superior to the MDNA Tour. Nunstedt complimented the show's interactive nature, and commended the singer's speech regarding the November 2015 Paris attacks and singing "Like a Prayer" as a tribute to the victims and survivors. Andrea Annaratone from Italian Vanity Fair reviewed the shows in Turin and gave a similar feedback like Nunstedt, but he criticized Madonna for starting the concert late. Peter Vantyghem from Belgium's De Standaard reviewed the show at Antwerp. He criticized the music assimilation during the Latin section, but was complimentary about the ending of the show and the messages of love and positivism. Hester Carvalho from the NRC Handelsblad rated the Amsterdam show four stars out of five, noting that the concert gradually became more streamlined but had less synchronized dance moves unlike the MDNA Tour. Carvalho was also impressed by the stage setting and the long catwalk.

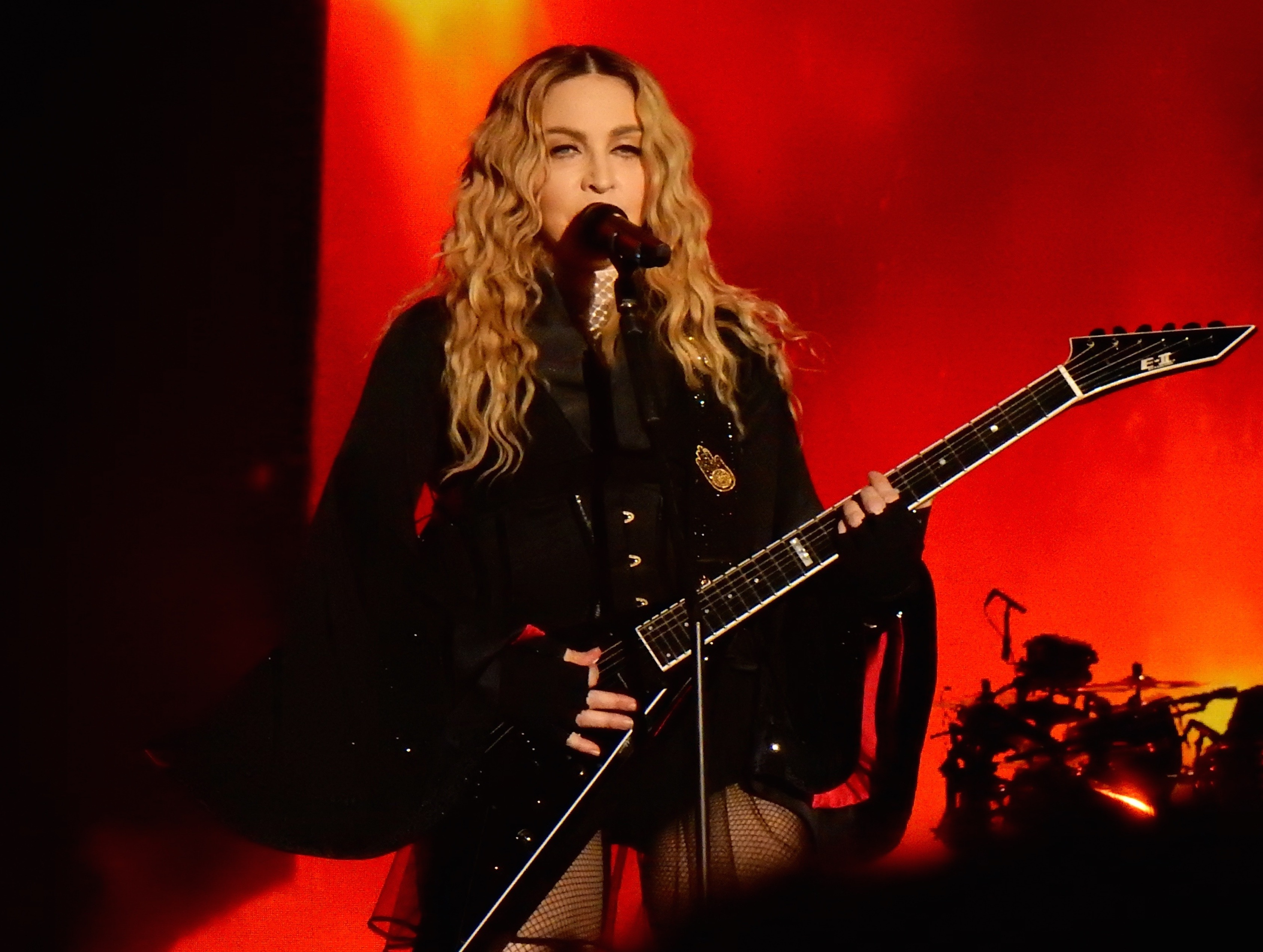
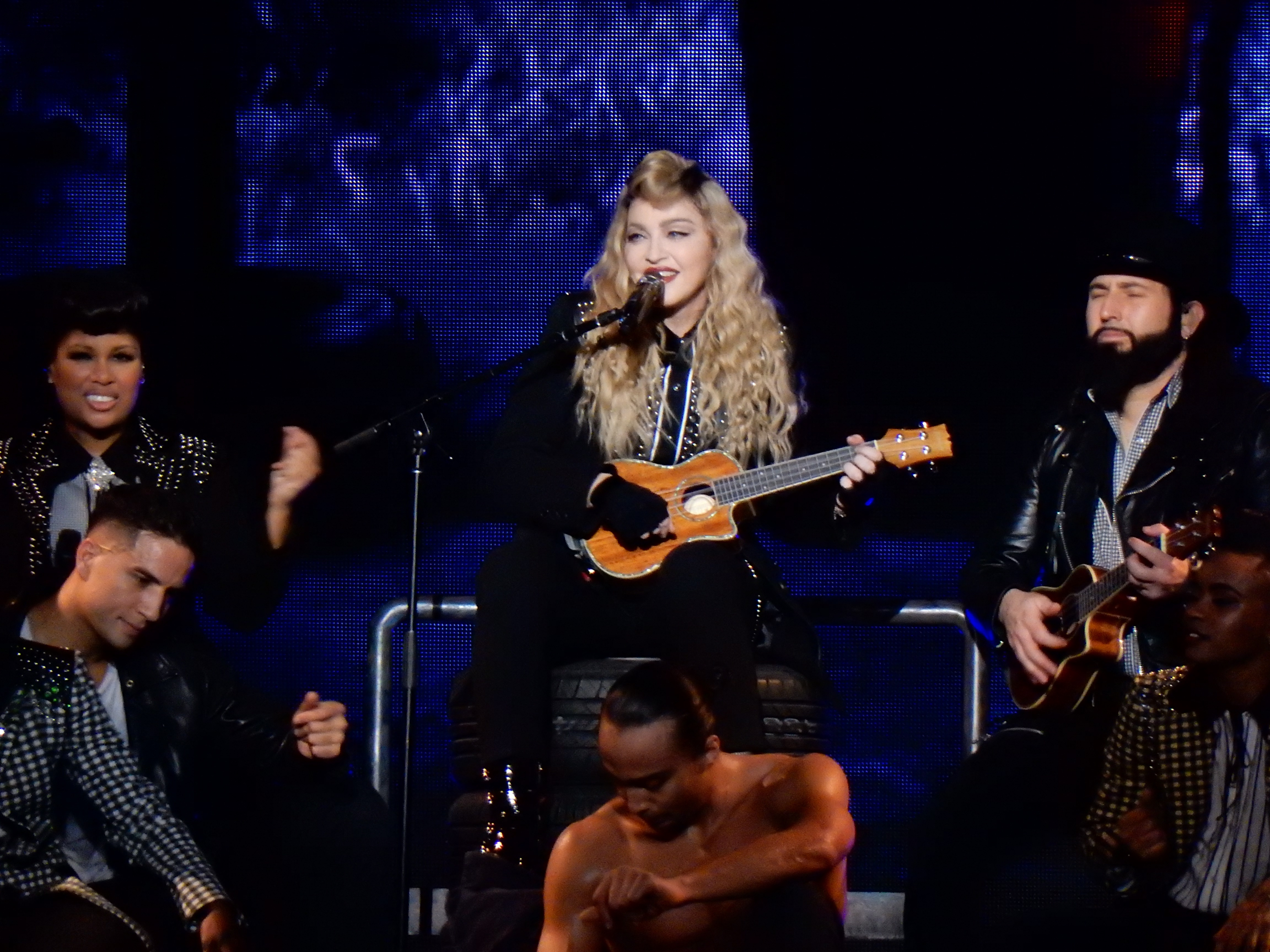
Mark Savage singled out "Burning Up" (left) as an "early highlight", and praised the singer for "resurrecting overlooked gems" such as "True Blue" (right).

Will Hodgkinson from The Times reviewed the shows at London's The O_{2}, and gave it a five star rating. He commented that "Madonna goes in and out of fashion but one constant remains: her tenacity... [She] returned to the O_{2} for a concert that proved that there's nothing like a near-death experience to re-invigorate the Queen of Pop." Another five star rating came from Neil McCormick of The Daily Telegraph who noticed that the loudest cheer from the audience came when Madonna successfully unraveled herself from her cape during "Living for Love", referencing her falling down at the Brit Awards 2015. McCormick described the concert as "a dazzling hi-tech, multimedia melange of light and sound, with eye and mind boggling set pieces featuring fantasy medieval executioners, martial art fighting geishas, pole dancing nuns, simulated sex shows." Peter Robinson from The Guardian rated it four out of five stars complimenting "Iconic" as the "perfect opening number". He observed that most "signature hits appear in an updated style... but when Madonna delivers a refreshingly faithful version of 'Deeper and Deeper', it's the night's highlight". Nick Levine from NME believed that "too much" of the songs from Rebel Heart "could have felt try-hard from [Madonna]", but "on stage she still works harder and delivers more thrills than her younger [peers]". Reviewing the show for BBC, Mark Savage noted that its strongest moments came when Madonna performed alone onstage.

Lauren James from the South China Morning Post found the show as "tightly choreographed", adding that "Hong Kong finally got to bask in Madonna's glow, but it was far too much fun to be a one-night stand". Reviewing the concert in Bangkok, Manta Klangboonkrong from AsiaOne commented: "Madonna gave us what was clearly one of the most sensational concerts that's ever graced Bangkok. She did a great job as a dancer, singer and all-round entertainer." Jojo Panaligan from the Manila Bulletin noted that Madonna's unapologetic attitude was on display at the show in Mall of Asia Arena, and observed that the crowd reacted positively. Reviewing the show at Sydney's Rod Laver Arena, Michael Lallo from The Sydney Morning Herald awarded the concert four-and-a-half out of five stars. He felt that from Blond Ambition to Rebel Heart, Madonna had "re-asserted herself... Everything was polished to within an inch of its life – which is what made it so magnificent".

== Controversies ==
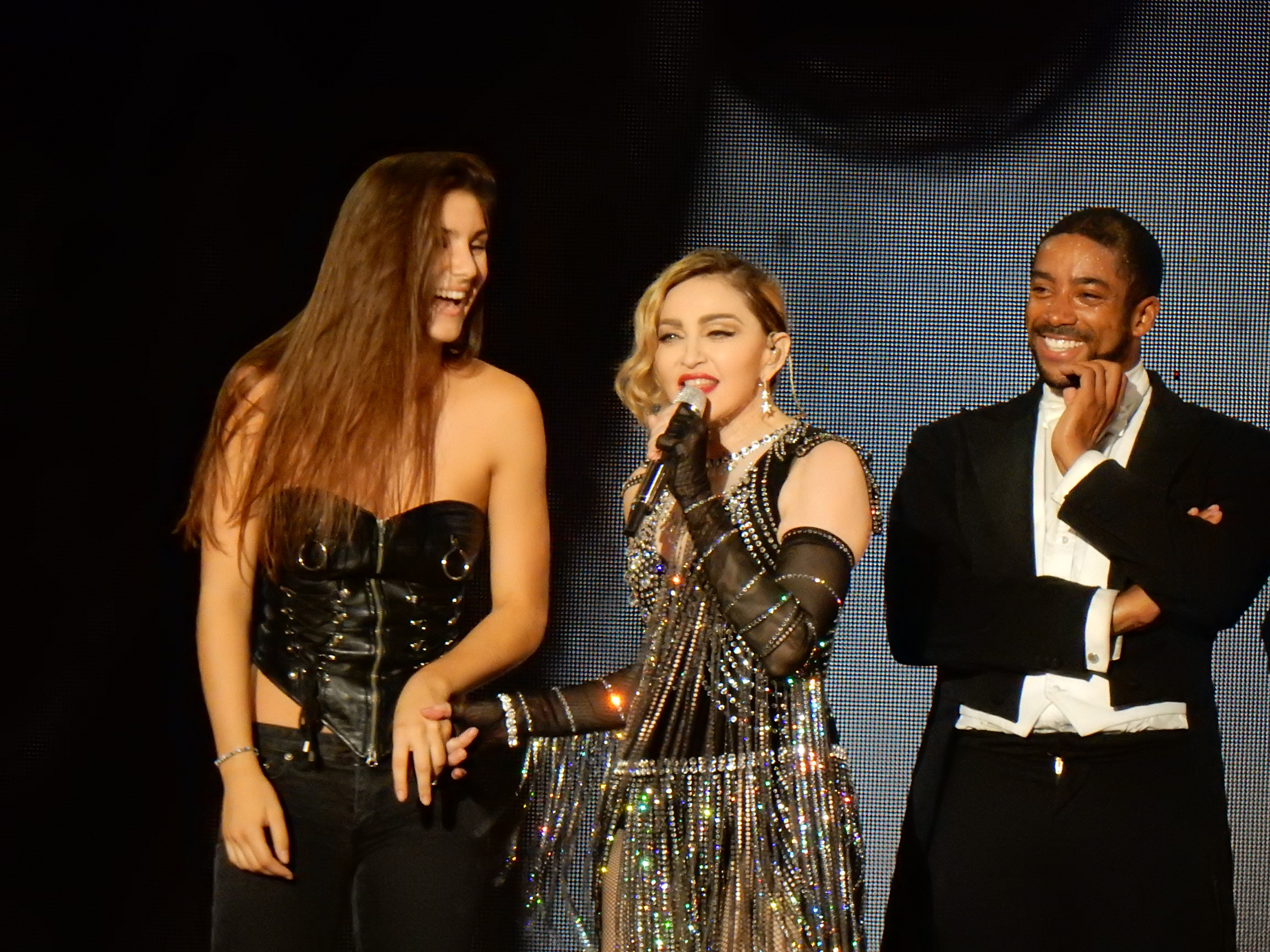
Madonna performing "Unapologetic Bitch" with 17-year-old Josephine Georgiou on Brisbane. During the concert, the singer accidentally exposed the teenager's breast, which caused a negative reaction from the general public.

Controversies surrounding the tour revolved around late show starts, unlawful uses of a country's flag and errors concerning tickets. Her appearance in Manchester attracted large criticism from fans, who booed at her for late arrival. Madonna responded to the audience during the show, stating that it was due to technical difficulties. During her first concert in Hong Kong and Taipei, Madonna was two-and-a-half hours late; the former delay caused a small protest outside the show. Another late incident happened for the shows in Brisbane.

Madonna's Instagram post about her arrival in Taiwan caused controversy, when it was noted that the singer had used an old badge of the Taiwanese political party, the Kuomintang (associated with the White Terror incidents), instead of the actual national emblem. During the performance, Madonna wore the current flag of Taiwan before confessing her love for both Taiwan and China. In Philippines, Madonna wore the country's flag as part of the encore segment. As the use of the country's flag as a "costume or uniform" was banned in 1998 by federal law, Madonna faced threats from the government of the Philippines for "disrespecting" the flag, as well as a possible ban from the region.

During Madonna's performances on March 5–6, 2016 in New Zealand, several attendees were refused entry to the shows because their tickets were rendered invalid. Approximately 20 people, who purchased their tickets through the Queen of Tickets website, were turned away from entering the venue, while others were required to generate a separate printed ticket at customer service booths. According to Stuff.co.nz, Ticketmaster had changed the seating plan of the venues without contacting Queen of Tickets website; as a result they had to refund the people who had brought a ticket from them. At the end of Madonna's second show in Brisbane, the singer accidentally exposed the breast of a 17-year-old girl named Josephine Georgiou on stage by pulling down her top. The singer had jokingly reacted: "Oh sorry, sexual harassment". It caused controversy when the general public took to social media to label the incident as a sexual assault. Georgiou defended the singer by stating it was "the best time of my life".

== Concert film ==
In March 2016, Madonna announced that the Sydney, Australia shows of March 19–20, 2016 would be filmed for a tour DVD. Danny Tull and Nathan Rissman, who had both worked on Madonna's previous tour videos, were enlisted to direct the concert film. In September 2016, Madonna announced on her Instagram that she had finished watching a "rough assembly" of the tour's film, and it would be out in the next two months. The concert premiered on December 9, 2016, on American cable channel Showtime. Titled Madonna: Rebel Heart Tour, it featured the main concert as well as behind-the-scenes footage from the show. The international rights for the film was acquired by Alfred Haber Distribution Inc. (AHDI). A live album of the tour was released on September 15, 2017, in DVD, Blu-ray, CD and digital download formats. It contained bonus content like the Madonna: Tears of a Clown show, as well as a 22-song live double CD.

== Set list ==
The following set list was obtained from the concert held on December 1, 2015, at the O_{2} Arena in London, England. It does not represent all concerts for the duration of the tour. Samples taken from the notes and track listing of Rebel Heart Tour, and additional notes.

Act 1: Joan of Arc/Samurai

1. "Revolution" (Video introduction; contains elements of "Iconic")
2. "Iconic"
3. "Bitch I'm Madonna"
4. "Burning Up"
5. "Holy Water" / "Vogue"
6. "Devil Pray"
7. "Messiah" (Video interlude)

Act 2: Rockabilly Meets Tokyo

8. "Body Shop"
9. "True Blue"
10. "Deeper and Deeper"
11. "HeartBreakCity" / "Love Don't Live Here Anymore"
12. "Like a Virgin" (Contains elements of "Heartbeat" and "Erotica")
13. "S.E.X." (Video interlude; contains elements of "Justify My Love")

Act 3: Latin/Gypsy

14. "Living for Love"
15. "La Isla Bonita"
16. Medley: "Dress You Up" / "Into the Groove" / "Lucky Star"
17. "Who's That Girl"
18. "Rebel Heart"

Act 4: Party/Flapper

19. "Illuminati" (Video interlude)
20. "Music" (Contains elements of "Give It 2 Me")
21. "Candy Shop"
22. "Material Girl"
23. "La Vie en rose" (Edith Piaf cover)
24. "Diamonds Are a Girl's Best Friend" (A cappella snippet)
25. "Unapologetic Bitch"

Encore

26. "Holiday" (Contains elements of "Take Me to the Mardi Gras")

Notes

- The "Dress You Up" medley and "Who's That Girl" were not performed on all dates.
- On select dates, Madonna sang acoustic versions of "Like a Prayer" and "Ghosttown".
- During the concerts in Montreal and Washington, the "Dress You Up" medley also included "Everybody".
- During the concerts in Detroit, San Jose, San Diego, and San Antonio; Madonna sang an acoustic version of "Frozen".
- During the concert in St. Paul, Madonna sang an a cappella version of "Fever". It was performed again during the first show in Macau and the second shows in Cologne and Melbourne.
- During the concert in Vancouver, Madonna performed an acoustic version of "Secret". It was performed again during the shows in Portland, Las Vegas, Inglewood, and Atlanta; the first show in Prague, Berlin, and Amsterdam; and the second show in Cologne and Turin.
- "Don't Tell Me" was sung during the concerts in Tulsa, Nashville, and Antwerp; and the first shows in Turin, Barcelona, Amsterdam, Saitama and Auckland.
- During the second concert in London, Madonna performed "Drowned World/Substitute For Love" as a tribute to her late friend David Collins.
- During the first concert in Paris, Madonna performed "Redemption Song" with her son David.
- During the concert in Manchester, Madonna performed the intro to "Secret", on guitar, but then forgot the rest of the chords. On a fan's request, she sang "Open Your Heart" instead. Prior to the concert, the video files for the show had become corrupted, resulting in a reboot of the whole system, which caused the show to begin late, resulting in several songs being cut from the set list. The concert ended after "Material Girl".
- During the first concert in Mexico City, Madonna dedicated "Who's That Girl" to Frida Kahlo. In the second night, the audience sang "Cielito Lindo" to Madonna.
- During the concert in Houston, Madonna performed David Bowie's "Rebel Rebel" as a tribute to him after his death.
- During the concert in Nashville, Madonna sang "Beautiful Stranger" and "Ring of Fire" a capella.
- During both concerts in Miami, Madonna performed "Don't Cry for Me Argentina".
- "Take a Bow" was added to the set list during the first concert in Taipei.
- During the second concert in Manila, Madonna performed "Crazy for You", as tribute to the 30th anniversary of the 1986 People Power Revolution.
- During the concert in Singapore, "Iconic", "Holy Water" and "Devil Pray" were removed from the set list. Additionally, Madonna performed "Crazy for You".
- During the first concert in Brisbane, Madonna performed "Can't Get You Out of My Head" and "Crazy for You".
- On the tour's final concerts in Sydney, Madonna sang "Like a Prayer", "Take a Bow", and a snippet of "Hanky Panky".

== Tour dates ==
List of 2015 concerts
Date (2015)	City	Country	Venue	Opening act	Attendance (Tickets sold / available)	Revenue
September 9	Montreal	Canada	Bell Centre	Diplo	26,468 / 26,468	$3,420,984
September 10	Montreal	Canada	Bell Centre	Diplo	26,468 / 26,468	$3,420,984
September 12	Washington, D.C.	United States	Verizon Center	Sleepy Tom	13,271 / 13,271	$2,014,706
September 16	New York City	United States	Madison Square Garden	Amy Schumer	28,371 / 28,371	$5,230,985
September 17	New York City	United States	Madison Square Garden	Amy Schumer	28,371 / 28,371	$5,230,985
September 19	New York City	United States	Barclays Center	Amy Schumer	14,258 / 14,258	$2,789,910
September 21	Quebec City	Canada	Videotron Centre	Sleepy Tom	13,051 / 13,051	$1,078,608
September 24	Philadelphia	United States	Wells Fargo Center	Michael Diamond	10,544 / 10,544	$1,434,010
September 26	Boston	United States	TD Garden	Michael Diamond	12,780 / 12,780	$1,941,750
September 28	Chicago	United States	United Center	Michael Diamond	14,026 / 14,026	$2,522,365
October 1	Detroit	United States	Joe Louis Arena	Kaytranada	12,852 / 12,852	$1,206,431
October 3	Atlantic City	United States	Boardwalk Hall	Michael Diamond	9,498 / 9,498	$1,522,061
October 5	Toronto	Canada	Air Canada Centre	Michael Diamond	26,603 / 26,603	$3,416,646
October 6	Toronto	Canada	Air Canada Centre	Michael Diamond	26,603 / 26,603	$3,416,646
October 8	Saint Paul	United States	Xcel Energy Center	Michael Diamond	11,449 / 11,449	$1,190,535
October 11	Edmonton	Canada	Rexall Place	Lunice	26,093 / 26,093	$3,310,026
October 12	Edmonton	Canada	Rexall Place	Lunice	26,093 / 26,093	$3,310,026
October 14	Vancouver	Canada	Rogers Arena	Kaytranada	12,153 / 12,153	$1,227,073
October 17	Portland	United States	Moda Center	Michael Diamond	13,695 / 13,695	$2,004,420
October 19	San Jose	United States	SAP Center	Michael Diamond	12,862 / 12,862	$2,298,815
October 22	Glendale	United States	Gila River Arena	Michael Diamond	10,393 / 10,393	$1,307,510
October 24	Las Vegas	United States	MGM Grand Garden Arena	Lunice	12,787 / 12,787	$3,524,113
October 27	Inglewood	United States	The Forum	Michael Diamond	13,207 / 13,207	$2,852,095
October 29	San Diego	United States	Valley View Casino Center	Michael Diamond	10,574 / 10,574	$1,606,935
November 4	Cologne	Germany	Lanxess Arena	Mary Mac	25,952 / 25,952	$2,748,071
November 5	Cologne	Germany	Lanxess Arena	Mary Mac	25,952 / 25,952	$2,748,071
November 7	Prague	Czech Republic	O_{2} Arena	Rejjie Snow	33,408 / 33,408	$3,001,142
November 8	Prague	Czech Republic	O_{2} Arena	Rejjie Snow	33,408 / 33,408	$3,001,142
November 10	Berlin	Germany	Mercedes-Benz Arena	Idris Elba	23,588 / 23,588	$2,638,597
November 11	Berlin	Germany	Mercedes-Benz Arena	Mary Mac	23,588 / 23,588	$2,638,597
November 14 (Note: In Stockholm Madonna gave a speech regarding the victims of the Paris attack, explaining that she had considered cancelling the show "because in many ways I feel torn. Why am I up here dancing and having fun when people are crying over the loss of their loved ones?" However she changed her mind thinking that cancelling the show would let the terrorists win.)	Stockholm	Sweden	Tele2 Arena	Mary Mac	39,338 / 39,338	$3,482,634
November 16	Herning	Denmark	Jyske Bank Boxen	Mary Mac	12,263 / 12,263	$1,000,551
November 19	Turin	Italy	Pala Alpitour	Mary Mac	34,752 / 34,752	$3,694,172
November 21	Turin	Italy	Pala Alpitour	Mary Mac	34,752 / 34,752	$3,694,172
November 22	Turin	Italy	Pala Alpitour	Mary Mac	34,752 / 34,752	$3,694,172
November 24	Barcelona	Spain	Palau Sant Jordi	Lunice	28,104 / 28,104	$2,312,846
November 25	Barcelona	Spain	Palau Sant Jordi	Lunice	28,104 / 28,104	$2,312,846
November 28	Antwerp	Belgium	Sportpaleis	Lunice	19,315 / 19,315	$2,135,032
November 29	Mannheim	Germany	SAP Arena	Lunice	10,883 / 10,883	$1,213,890
December 1	London	England	The O_{2} Arena	Idris Elba	28,670 / 28,670	$4,861,403
December 2	London	England	The O_{2} Arena	Mary Mac	28,670 / 28,670	$4,861,403
December 5	Amsterdam	Netherlands	Ziggo Dome	Lunice	30,023 / 30,023	$3,559,122
December 6	Amsterdam	Netherlands	Ziggo Dome	Lunice	30,023 / 30,023	$3,559,122
December 9 (Note: After the show, Madonna traveled to the Place de la République and performed an impromptu performance in honor of the Paris victims, singing "Ghosttown", "Imagine" as well as "Like a Prayer". She was accompanied by her son David and guitarist Monte Pittman.)	Paris	France	AccorHotels Arena	Lunice	30,817 / 30,817	$3,868,967
December 10	Paris	France	AccorHotels Arena	Lunice	30,817 / 30,817	$3,868,967
December 12	Zürich	Switzerland	Hallenstadion	Lunice	11,306 / 11,306	$1,773,189
December 14	Manchester	England	Manchester Arena	Mary Mac	14,177 / 14,177	$2,342,186
December 16	Birmingham	England	Barclaycard Arena	Mary Mac	12,119 / 12,119	$1,863,342
December 20 (Note: During the show at SSE Hydro, the lights came up with the encore performance of "Holiday" still left to be started. Madonna chose to continue performing the song with her dancers and asked the audience to join her in a sing-along. Representative of the venue reported that the power was cut off by Madonna's production team to avoid late fines.)	Glasgow	Scotland	The SSE Hydro	Mary Mac	9,665 / 9,665	$1,574,416

List of 2016 concerts
Date (2016)	City	Country	Venue	Opening act	Attendance (Tickets sold / available)	Revenue
January 6	Mexico City	Mexico	Palacio de los Deportes	Lunice	31,696 / 31,696	$4,537,609
January 7	Mexico City	Mexico	Palacio de los Deportes	Lunice	31,696 / 31,696	$4,537,609
January 10	San Antonio	United States	AT&T Center	Mary Mac	14,543 / 14,543	$1,915,670
January 12	Houston	United States	Toyota Center	Mary Mac	11,604 / 11,604	$1,671,630
January 14	Tulsa	United States	BOK Center	Mary Mac	10,891 / 10,891	$1,559,410
January 16	Louisville	United States	KFC Yum! Center	Mary Mac	14,558 / 14,558	$1,856,200
January 18	Nashville	United States	Bridgestone Arena	Mary Mac	11,569 / 11,569	$1,430,485
January 20 (Note: The concert of January 20, 2016, at the Philips Arena in Atlanta was originally scheduled to take place on September 2, 2015, but was postponed due to arrangement logistics being incomplete within the time given.)	Atlanta	United States	Philips Arena	Lunice	10,609 / 10,609	$1,500,635
January 23 (Note: The concert of January 23, 2016, at the American Airlines Arena in Miami was originally scheduled to take place on August 29, 2015, but was postponed due to arrangement logistics being incomplete within the time given.)	Miami	United States	American Airlines Arena	Lunice	26,468 / 26,468	$2,555,425
January 24 (Note: The concert of January 24, 2016, at the American Airlines Arena in Miami was originally scheduled to take place on August 30, 2015, but was postponed due to arrangement logistics being incomplete within the time given.)	Miami	United States	American Airlines Arena	Lunice	26,468 / 26,468	$2,555,425
January 27 (Note: The concert of January 27, 2016, at the Coliseo de Puerto Rico in San Juan was originally scheduled to take place on September 5, 2015, but was postponed due to arrangement logistics being incomplete within the time given.)	San Juan	Puerto Rico	Coliseo de Puerto Rico	Lunice	18,539 / 18,539	$2,352,219
January 28 (Note: The concert of January 28, 2016, at the Coliseo de Puerto Rico in San Juan was originally scheduled to take place on September 6, 2015, but was postponed due to arrangement logistics being incomplete within the time given.)	San Juan	Puerto Rico	Coliseo de Puerto Rico	Lunice	18,539 / 18,539	$2,352,219
February 4	Taipei	Taiwan	Taipei Arena	Mary Mac	22,554 / 22,554	$6,578,042
February 6	Taipei	Taiwan	Taipei Arena	Mary Mac	22,554 / 22,554	$6,578,042
February 9	Bangkok	Thailand	Impact Arena	Mary Mac	19,930 / 19,930	$4,584,740
February 10	Bangkok	Thailand	Impact Arena	Mary Mac	19,930 / 19,930	$4,584,740
February 13	Saitama (Note: Billed as Tokyo.)	Japan	Saitama Super Arena	Mary Mac	37,706 / 37,706	$9,609,418
February 14	Saitama	Japan	Saitama Super Arena	Mary Mac	37,706 / 37,706	$9,609,418
February 17	Hong Kong	China	AsiaWorld–Arena	Mary Mac	21,808 / 21,808	$4,907,134
February 18	Hong Kong	China	AsiaWorld–Arena	Mary Mac	21,808 / 21,808	$4,907,134
February 20	Macau	China	Studio City Event Center	Mary Mac	7,446 / 7,446	$8,265,771
February 21	Macau	China	Studio City Event Center	Mary Mac	7,446 / 7,446	$8,265,771
February 24 (Note: Following the shows in Philippines, media reported that Madonna would face a ban from the country, since during her performance she had used the country's flag, which is not allowed per law.)	Pasay	Philippines	Mall of Asia Arena	Mary Mac	15,710 / 15,710	$4,956,105
February 25	Pasay	Philippines	Mall of Asia Arena	Mary Mac	15,710 / 15,710	$4,956,105
February 28	Singapore		Singapore National Stadium	—N/a	19,123 / 19,123	$6,093,229
March 5	Auckland	New Zealand	Vector Arena	Mary Mac	17,386 / 17,386	$3,593,978
March 6	Auckland	New Zealand	Vector Arena	Mary Mac	17,386 / 17,386	$3,593,978
March 12	Melbourne	Australia	Rod Laver Arena	Mary Mac	23,768 / 23,768	$5,482,518
March 13	Melbourne	Australia	Rod Laver Arena	Mary Mac	23,768 / 23,768	$5,482,518
March 16 (Note: The concert of March 16, 2016, at the Brisbane Entertainment Centre in Brisbane was originally scheduled to take place on March 26.)	Brisbane	Australia	Brisbane Entertainment Centre	Mary Mac	13,886 / 13,886	$2,332,579
March 17 (Note: The concert of March 17, 2016, at the Brisbane Entertainment Centre in Brisbane was originally scheduled to take place on March 27.)	Brisbane	Australia	Brisbane Entertainment Centre	Mary Mac	13,886 / 13,886	$2,332,579
March 19	Sydney	Australia	Allphones Arena	Mary Mac	26,370 / 26,370	$6,052,001
March 20	Sydney	Australia	Allphones Arena	Mary Mac	26,370 / 26,370	$6,052,001
Total					1,045,479 / 1,045,479 (100%)	$169,804,336

== Personnel ==
Adapted from the Rebel Heart Tour program.

=== Show ===
- Madonna – creator
- Jamie King – show director
- Tiffany Olson – assistant show director
- Stufish Entertainment Architects – stage design
- Megan Lawson – lead choreographer and creative consultant
- Al Gordon – lighting designer

=== Band ===
- Madonna – vocals, guitar, ukulele
- Kevin Antunes – musical director, keyboards
- Monte Pittman – guitar, ukulele
- Brian Frasier-Moore – drums
- Ric'key Pageot – keyboards
- Nicki Richards – backing vocals
- Kiley Dean – backing vocals
- Sean Spuehler – vocal mix engineer

=== Choreographers and performers ===
- Jason Young – co-supervising choreographer
- Valeree Young – co-supervising choreographer
- Matt Cady – additional choreographer
- Kevin Maher – additional choreographer
- Aya Sato – additional choreographer
- Mona Marie – additional choreographer
- Jillian Meyers – additional choreographer
- Chaz Buzan – additional choreographer
- Sebastian Ramirez – additional choreographer
- Mary Cebrian – additional choreographer
- Marvin Gofin – additional choreographer
- Emilie Chapel – additional choreographer
- Yaman Okur – additional choreographer
- Sonia Olla – additional choreographer
- Ismael Fernandez – additional choreographer
- Scott Maldment – additional choreographer
- the Strut n Fret Team – additional choreographer
- Rich and Tone Talauega – additional choreographer
- Kupono Aweau – dancer
- Allaune Blegbo – dancer
- Deurell Bullock – dancer
- Grichka Caruge – dancer
- Justin De Vera – dancer
- Coral Dolphin – dancer
- Marvin Gofin – dancer
- Malik Le Nost – dancer
- Loic Mabanza – dancer
- Sasha Mallory – dancer
- Sheik Mondesia – dancer
- Bambi Nakayama – dancer
- Jo'Artis Ratti – dancer
- Lil' Buck Riley – dancer
- Aya Sato – dancer
- Ai Shimatsu – dancer
- Sohey Sugihara – dancer
- Maria Wada – dancer
- Ahlamalik Williams – dancer

=== Costume department ===
- Arianne Phillips – tour stylist
- Laura Morgan – stylist assistant
- Taryn Shumway – stylist assistant
- Jessica Dell – stylist assistant
- Miu Miu – costume design
- Prada – costume design
- Gucci – costume design
- Fausto Puglisi – costume design
- Moschino – costume design
- Nicolas Jebran – costume design
- Aura Tout Vu – costume design
- Swarovski – costume design
- Alexander Wang – costume design
- Lilly e Violetta – costume design

=== Road and touring crew ===
- Tony Villanueva – Madonna's dresser
- Mel Dykes – wardrobe supervisor
- Lisa Nishimura – wardrobe assistant to Madonna
- Janelle Corey – wardrobe dresser
- Noriko Kakihara – wardrobe dresser
- Danielle Martinez – wardrobe dresser
- Laura Spratt – wardrobe dresser
- Michael Velasquez – wardrobe tailor

=== Tour staff ===
- Tres Thomas – tour director
- Rick Sobkówiak – tour accountant and operations manager
- Sherine Sherman – production accountant
- Stacey Saari – tour ticketing
- Brea Thomas – executive assistant
- Natasha Veinberg – VIP program coordinator
- Colleen Cozart – VIP program coordinator

=== Madonna's staff ===
- Andy Lecompte – hair and make-up
- Aaron Henrikson – hair and make-up
- Aaron Henrikson – make-up artist for Madonna
- Gina Brooke – rehearsals make-up consultant
- Martin Conton – security
- Craig Evans – security
- Gingi Levin – security
- Erez Netzer – security
- Shir Sheleg – security
- Travis Dorsey – artist chef
- Jean-Michel Ete – nutritionist and esthetician
- Michelle Peck – nutritionist and esthetician
- Craig Smith – Madonna's trainers
- Marlyn Ortiz – Madonna's trainers
- Gigi Fouquet – assistant to Madonna
- Mae Heidenreich – assistant to Madonna
- Megan Duffy – production assistant
- Richard Coble – artist tour manager
- Abby Roberts – assistant tour manager
- Maria Guitterez – rehearsals assistant
- Janine Edwards – hotel advance

=== Entourage party ===
- Jill McCutchan – entourage tour manager
- Jeremy Childs – assistant tour manager
- Mark Parkhouse – physical therapist

=== Management ===
- Guy Oseary – manager
- Sara Zambreno – additional management
- Danielle Doll – additional management
- Rachel Gordh – assistant to Guy Oseary
- Liz Rosenberg – publicity
- Brian Bumbery – publicity
- Barbara Charone – UK publicity
- Johann Delebarre
- Abe Burns – webster & digital media
- Karine Prot – archives
- Richard Feldstein – business management – webster & digital media
- Rosy Simon – business management

=== Video and production ===
- Moment Factory – design
- Veneno Inc. – design
- Sakchin Bessette – creative directors
- Caroline Oliveira – creative directors
- The Good Company – video production
- Vfx by MPC – video production
- Johanna Marsal – video production
- Anotherproduction AB – video production
- Steven Klein – video directors
- Tarik Mikou – video directors
- Danny Tull – video directors
- Jonas Åkerlund – video directors
- Fabien Baron – video directors
- Tom Munro – video directors
- Team J.A.C.K. – video directors
- Johan Soderberg – video directors
- Danny Tull – video editing
- Alex Hammer – video editing
- Russ Senzatimore – video editing
- Tom Watson – video editing
- Hamish Lyons – video editing

=== Worldwide promoter and producer ===
- Live Nation Global Touring – tour promoter
- Arthur Fogel – president and chief executive officer
- Gerry Barad – chief operating officer
- Tres Thomas – senior VP, global operations
- Craig Evans – senior VP, global operations
