= Wang Ramirez =

Wang Ramirez is a contemporary dance duo composed of Honji Wang and Sébastien Ramirez. The duo formed in 2007 in Perpignan, France. Their dance language is an outgrowth of hip hop meld with influences from contemporary dance, ballet and martial art movements.

== Career ==
Honji Wang and Sébastien Ramirez have produced and choreographed dance-theatre pieces that have won them awards such as the New York Bessie Award and the nomination for the Rolex Mentor & Protégée Arts Initiative Program. The company is invited in theatres and festivals as Théâtre de la Ville, La Villette and Théâtre National de Chaillot (Paris), Sadler's Wells (London), Apollo Theater (New York City), Mercat de les Flors (Barcelona), etc. and receives the support of international co-producers.

== Choreographies ==
- 2018 : W.A.M. – We Are Monchichi – Honji Wang and Sébastien Ramirez adapt their 2011 production, Monchichi, for children and their families.
- 2017 : No.1 – A collaboration between the New York City Ballet principal Sara Mearns and the duo Sébastien Ramirez and Honji Wang.
- 2016 : EVERYNESS – A creation for 6 dancers.
- 2015 : Felahikum – A duo.
- 2013 : Borderline – A creation for 6 performers.
- 2011 : True Blue Market – An abstract work with a choreography for 5 Finnish dancers.
- 2011 : Monchichi – Hip-hop and tanztheater.
- 2010 : AP15 – Wang Ramirez' debut piece.

== Awards and nominations ==
Year	Award	Category	Recipient
2013	The New York Bessie Award	Outstanding Performance	AP15
2012	Rolex Mentor & Protégé Arts Initiative Program	Nomination	Wang & Ramirez
2012	Hannover 26th choreographic competition	1st and special audience award	AP15
2012	Ludwigshafen No Ballet contemporary dance competition	Audience's Best Choreography award	AP15
2009	Japan Dance Delight International hiphop competition	Jury's special award	Wang & Ramirez
2007	Johannesburg Red Bull BC One Championship	Finals	Ramirez
