= Clay Paky =

Italian stage lighting company

Claypaky
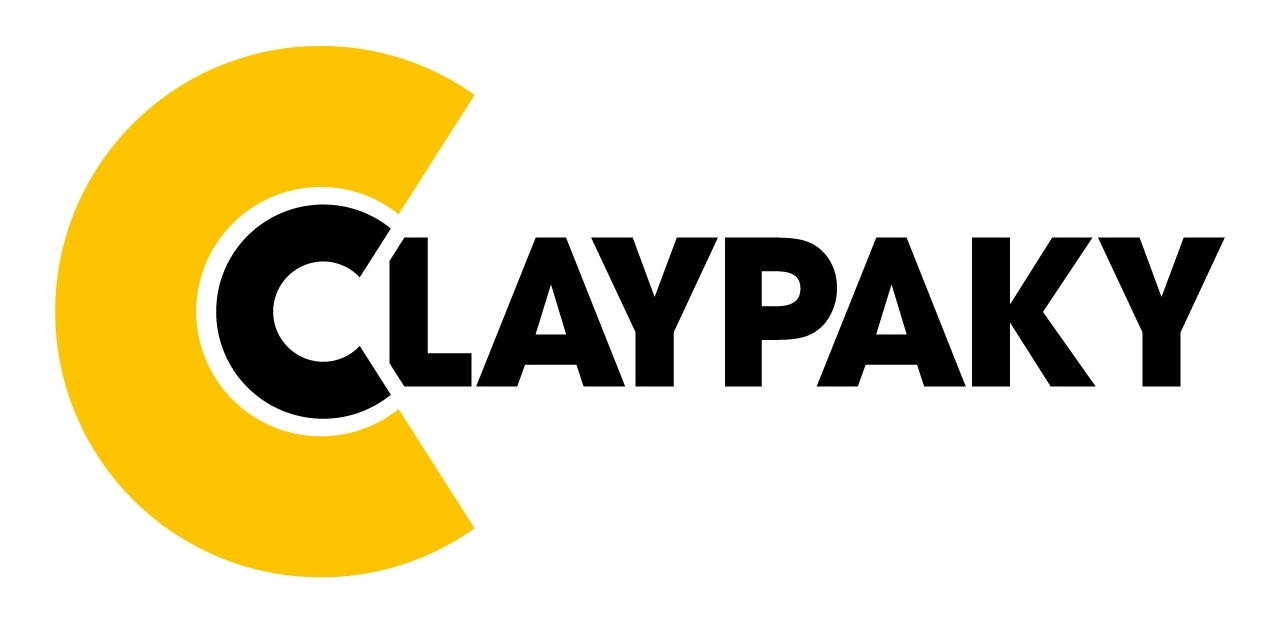
- Type: Subsidiary
- Industry: Stage lighting; Architectural lighting
- Founded: 28 August 1976, in Bergamo, Italy
- Founder: Pasquale Quadri
- Headquarters: Seriate, Italy
- Key people: Marcus Graser (CEO)
- Products: Professional lighting systems
- Number of employees: 200 (approx.)
- Parent: Independent (1976–2014); Osram (2014–22); Arri Group (2022–2025); EK Lights (2025–present)
- Website: www.claypaky.it

Claypaky is a developer of professional lighting systems for the entertainment sector (theatre, television, concerts, nightclubs and outdoor events) and for architectural applications. The company is based in Seriate, near Bergamo, about 40 kilometres (25 mi) from Milan, Italy.

It operates from a modern facility housing its R&D labs, main production plant and quality control, sales and administration departments. At present Clay Paky exports 95% of its production through a global sales and service organization represented by a dealer network active in more than 80 countries around the world.

On December 20, 2022, Osram sold the company to the Arri group. The company was then later sold to EK Lights.

== History ==
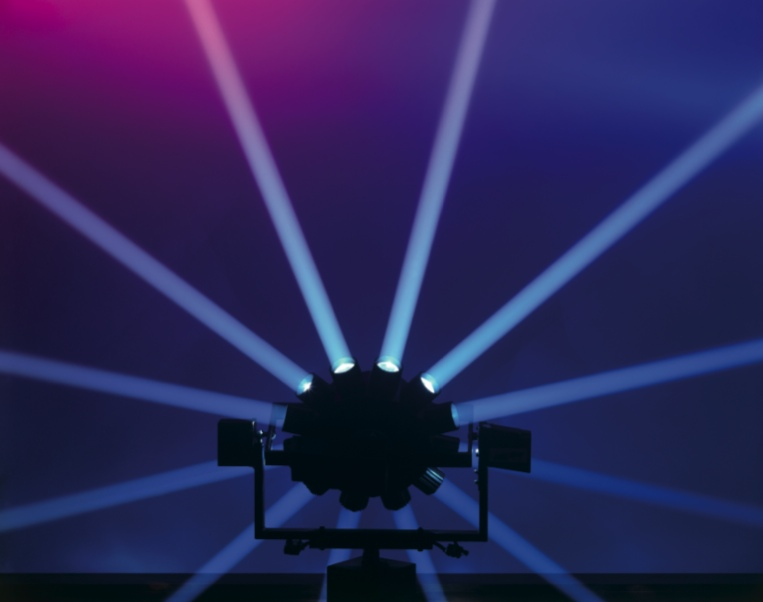
The Astrodisco by Clay Paky, a widely used disco light of the 1980s.

The Claypaky company was founded in August 1976, taking its name from the shortened, anglicized form of the name of its founder, Pasquale (Paky) Quadri, one of the first entrepreneurs to realize that technological developments in lighting would have an enormous future in the show business and entertainment world.

In 1982 Claypaky presented the Astrodisco, which used a single lamp to project multiple rays of colored light across ceilings and dance floors. Five years later it launched Brilliant, a digitally controlled moving head and forerunner of a new generation of "intelligent" projectors. This was followed in 1988 by the Golden Scan, a programmable moving mirror projector and the first luminaire to implement stepper motor technology instead of servo motors. The Golden Scan became a commonly used lighting effect at nightclubs and rock concerts during the late 1980s and the 1990s. The London rock band Klaxons claimed the projector was the inspiration behind their light-themed, hit single Golden Skans.

Since 2000, Claypaky has developed architectural applications. In 2002 it moved its headquarters to a new industrial complex in Seriate, Bergamo, achieving certification for compliance with the UNI EN ISO 9001 quality standard that same year.

In 2011, Claypaky reported a revenue of more than 50 million euro, an increase of over 50% on 2010. It has a workforce of nearly 200 people.

Just before its founder died in 2014, the company was sold to Osram. Claypaky was acquired by the Arri Group in December 2022.

On 13 May 2025 Claypaky announced that Arri's share in the company had been purchased by Chinese company EK Lights.

== Awards ==
Year	Award	Award name	Nominated product
2019	Best Debuting Product in Lighting	LDI	Product: XTYLOS
2019	Best Advancement in Lamp Technology	PLSN	Product: XTYLOS
2019	Outstanding Lighting Product Innovation	PALM Sound and Light Award	Product: Sharpy Plus
2017	Best Hard Edge LED Spot	PLSN Goldstar Product Award	Product: Axcor Profile 900
2017	Award for Innovation	Plasa Awards	Product: K-EYE
2017	Lighting Product	World Show	Product: Scenius
2016	Award for Innovation	Plasa Awards	Product: Scenius Profile
2015	Indispensable Technology	Parnelli Awards	Product: Mythos
2015	Best Debuting Lighting Product	LDI Awards	Product: Spheriscan
2015	Lighting Product of the Year	Live Design Awards	Product: Mythos
2014	Indispensable Technology	Parnelli Awards	Product: A.leda B-EYE
2014	Best Debuting Lighting Product - Honourable Mention	LDI Awards	Product: Mythos
2014	Award for Innovation	Plasa Awards	Product: Mythos
2014	Best Lighting Product	PIPA Awards	Product: A.leda B-EYE
2013	Best Debuting Lighting Product	LDI Awards	Product: A.leda B-EYE
2013	Award for Innovation	Plasa Awards	Product: A.leda B-EYE
2012	Best Debuting Lighting Product	LDI Awards	Product: Sharpy Wash
2012	Lighting Product of the Year	Live Design Awards	Product: Shotlight Wash
2011	Empresa de iluminación del año	Premios Producciόn Audio	Company: Clay Paky
2011	Most Creative Use of Lighting	LDI Awards	Company: Clay Paky
2011	Best Debuting Lighting Product	LDI Awards	Product: Alpha Spot 800 QWO
2011	Indispensable Technology	Parnelli Awards	Product: Sharpy
2011	Rock Our World Awards	Plasa	Product: Sharpy
2011	Lighting Product of the Year	Live Design Broadway Master Classes	Product: Sharpy
2010	Best Debuting Lighting Product - Honourable Mention	LDI Awards	Product: Sharpy
2010	Award for Innovation	Plasa Awards	Product: Sharpy
2010	Award for Innovation - Special Commendation	Plasa Awards	Product: ALPHA PROFILE 700
2010	Important contribution to the development of the club industry	Ciribelli Awards	Company: Clay Paky
2008	Award for Innovation	PLASA	Product: ALPHA BEAM 300
2002	New Lighting Product	LIVE AWARDS	Product: Stage Profile Plus SV
2001	Design Excellence	PLASA	Product: CP Color
1999	New Product of the Year	BEDA	Product: Stage Line
1999	New Lighting Fixture of the Year	LIVE AWARDS	Product: Stage Line
1999	Club Lighting Effects of the Year	ETA	Product: Stage Line
1999	Budget Lighting Effect of the Year	ETA	Product: Stage Color 300
1998	Al Miglior Concerto	TELEGATTO TV Sorrisi & Canzoni	Company: Clay Paky
1998	The Art and Technology of Show Business	EDDY AWARD	Product: Stage Line
1998	Luminaire of the Year	EN TECH	Product: Mini Scan HPE
1998	Innovative Lighting Product of the Year	ETA	Product: Stage Line
1997	Club Lighting Effect of the Year	ETA Disco International	Product: Golden Scan HPE
1997	Lighting Product of the Year Entertainment: Most Promising Prototype	LDI	Product: Stage Line
1997	Honourable Mention: Best Big Booth	LDI	Company: Clay Paky
1997	Light Product of the Year	TCI	Product: VIP 300
1997	Award for Product Excellence	PLASA	Product: Stage Scan
1996	Best Light Show of the Year	LIGHTING DIMENSION	Product: CP Show
1996	New Lighting Product of the Year	LIVE AWARDS	Product: Golden Scan HPE
1994, 1996	Full Sized Moving Light	EN TECH	Product: Golden Scan 3
1993, 1995, 1996	Light Product of the Year	BEDA	Product: Golden Scan 3
1995	Innovative Light Effect	DISCO INTERNATIONAL	Product: Golden Scan HPE
1995	Lighting Effect	DISCO INTERNATIONAL	Product: Golden Scan 3
1995	European Company	LIVE AWARDS	Company: Clay Paky
1994	Club Lighting Effect	DISCO & CLUB	Product: Golden Scan 3
1994	Automated Luminaire	LIVE AWARDS	Product: Golden Scan 3
1993	Club Lighting Product	DISCO & CLUB	Product: Golden Scan 3
1992	Manufacturer of the Year	DISCO & CLUB	Company: Clay Paky
1992	Lighting Award	BEDA	Product: Golden Scan 2
1990, 1991	Lighting Effect	DISCO & CLUB	Product: Golden Scan 2

== The MoMS - Museum of Modern Showlighting ==
A project conceived by Pasquale Quadri (1947-2014) and formally opened in 2015 — the UNESCO International Year of Light — the Museum of Modern Showlighting (MoMS) is the first European museum that specifically covers all the sectors where show lighting plays a vital role.

The museum investigates the chronology of advances in lighting technology in parallel with the development of the socio-cultural context.

After a brief historical excursus on stage lighting beginning in ancient Greece, the exhibition focuses attention on the 1980s and the development of lighting effects that gained recognition through musicals such as “Saturday Night Fever”. It then comes to the present and the complex motorised projectors available on today’s market.

The museum has a library consisting of an historical archive of reviews and a multimedia room.

== See also ==
- Stage lighting
- Stage lighting instruments
- Intelligent lighting
