= Rebel Heart Tour (album) =

2017 live album by Madonna

Live album / video by Madonna
- Released: September 15, 2017
- Recorded: March 19–20, 2016
- Venue: Sydney SuperDome (Australia)
- Length: 99:01 (album); 138:16 (video)
- Labels: Eagle Vision; Eagle
- Directors: Danny Tull; Nathan Rissman
- Producer: Madonna

Madonna chronology
Rebel Heart (2015)	Rebel Heart Tour (2017)	Madame X (2019)

Madonna video chronology
MDNA World Tour (2013)	Rebel Heart Tour (2017)

Rebel Heart Tour is the fifth live album by American singer and songwriter Madonna, chronicling her tenth worldwide concert tour of the same name, recorded at the Sydney SuperDome. It was released on September 15, 2017 by Eagle Vision on DVD and Blu-ray formats and by Eagle Records for audio versions. Rebel Heart Tour also contains bonus content like excerpts from the Tears of a Clown show (2016) at Melbourne's Forum Theatre, as well as a 22-song double CD. Danny Tull and Nathan Rissman, who had worked on Madonna's previous concert films, directed Rebel Heart Tour.

The album received generally positive feedback from critics, who picked Madonna's live singing, dancing and the production as highlights. Rebel Heart Tour reached the top of the DVD and video charts in most of the countries it charted in, and top ten of the album charts in Belgium (Flanders and Wallonia), Germany, Hungary, Italy, Portugal and Spain. At the 32nd Japan Gold Disc Award, Rebel Heart Tour won in the category of Best Music Video for Western Artists.

== Background ==
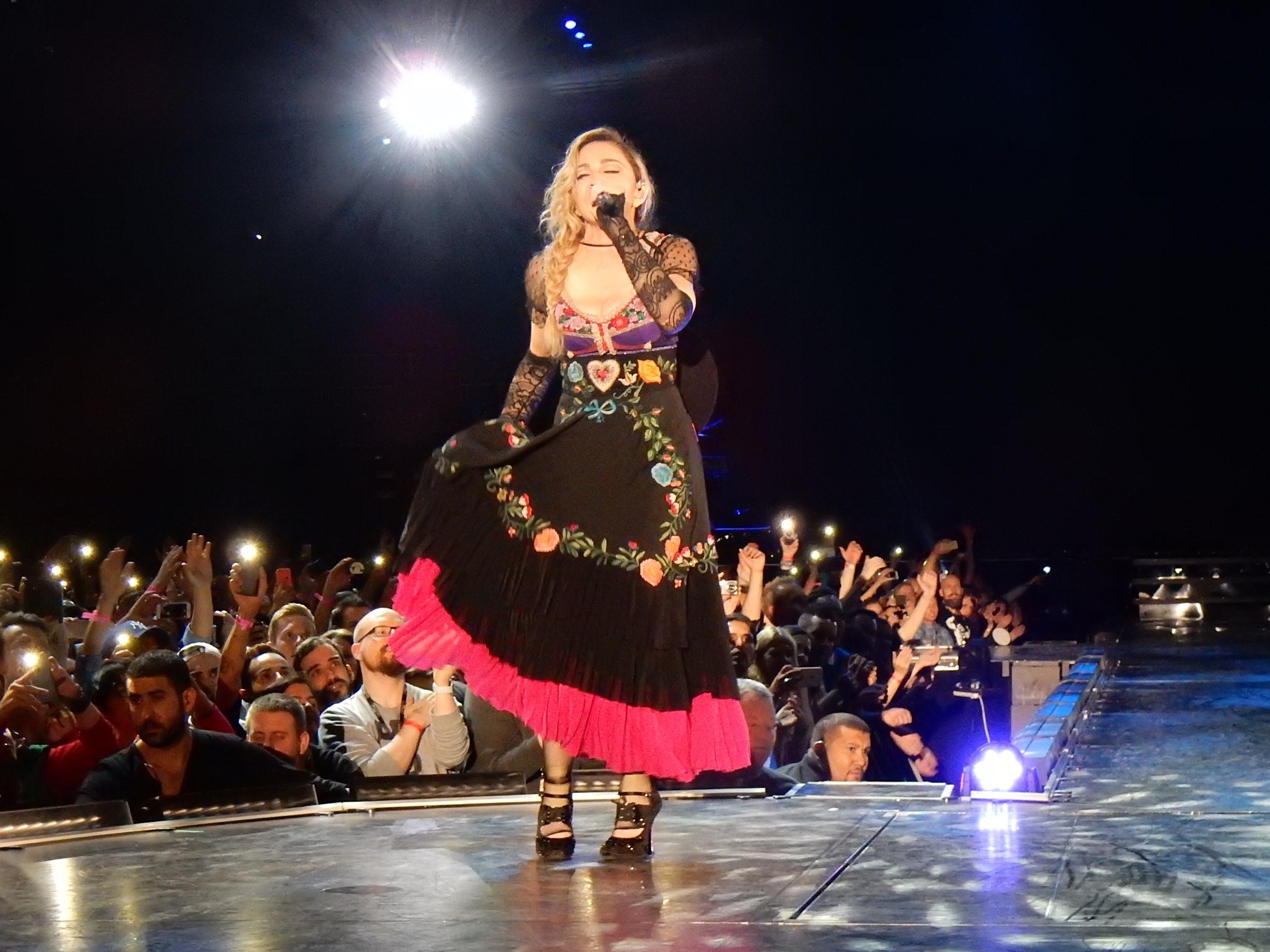
Madonna performing "Like a Prayer" on the Rebel Heart Tour; the performance of the song was included as a bonus track on the video release.

Madonna had embarked on the Rebel Heart Tour (2015–2016) to promote her thirteenth studio album, Rebel Heart. Performed in 82 shows across 55 cities, the tour was a commercial success earning US$169.8 million; it was attended by an audience of over 1.045 million. The performances at the Sydney SuperDome were recorded for the video release.

In September 2016, Madonna announced on her Instagram that she had finished watching a "rough assembly" of the tour's film, and it would be out in the next two months. Entertainment Weekly subsequently announced that the concert film would premiere on December 9, 2016 on American cable channel Showtime. Titled Madonna: Rebel Heart Tour, it featured behind-the-scenes footage from the Australian performances of the tour, which had been exclusively previewed by Billboard on December 2, 2016. Danny Tull and Nathan Rissman, who had worked on Madonna's previous concert films, directed Rebel Heart Tour. Madonna explained in an interview with BBC News:

I was there every step of the way, every day for months and months. It's really hard to capture the true feeling of the excitement and the passion and the heat and the blood, sweat and tears. I'm pleased with the way it came out... [W]hen I look back at the DVD it almost brings a tear to my eye because everyone seems so in love.

The film was released on September 15, 2017 on DVD, Blu-ray, and digital formats, containing bonus content like the Tears of a Clown show at Melbourne's Forum Theatre in 2016, as well as a 22-song double CD. The cover image was shot by fashion photographer Joshua Brandão. British Board of Film Classification (BBFC) listed the total running time of the album at over 138 minutes, with almost two hours for the main tour film and the rest for Tears of a Clown and a bonus performance of "Like a Prayer" (1989) during one of the shows. The release of Rebel Heart Tour was distributed by Eagle Rock Entertainment. It was made available for pre-order on August 16, 2017, Madonna's birthday, in all physical and digital-file-based stores. Along with the pre-order, a live version of "Material Girl" was purchasable from the digital outlets. The Japanese edition of the DVD/ Blu-ray included a performance of "Take a Bow" (1994) as a bonus track. Five years after its original release, the album was reissued on vinyl format by Mercury Records on September 9, 2022, featuring the same 14 tracks as the single-CD format.

== Critical response ==
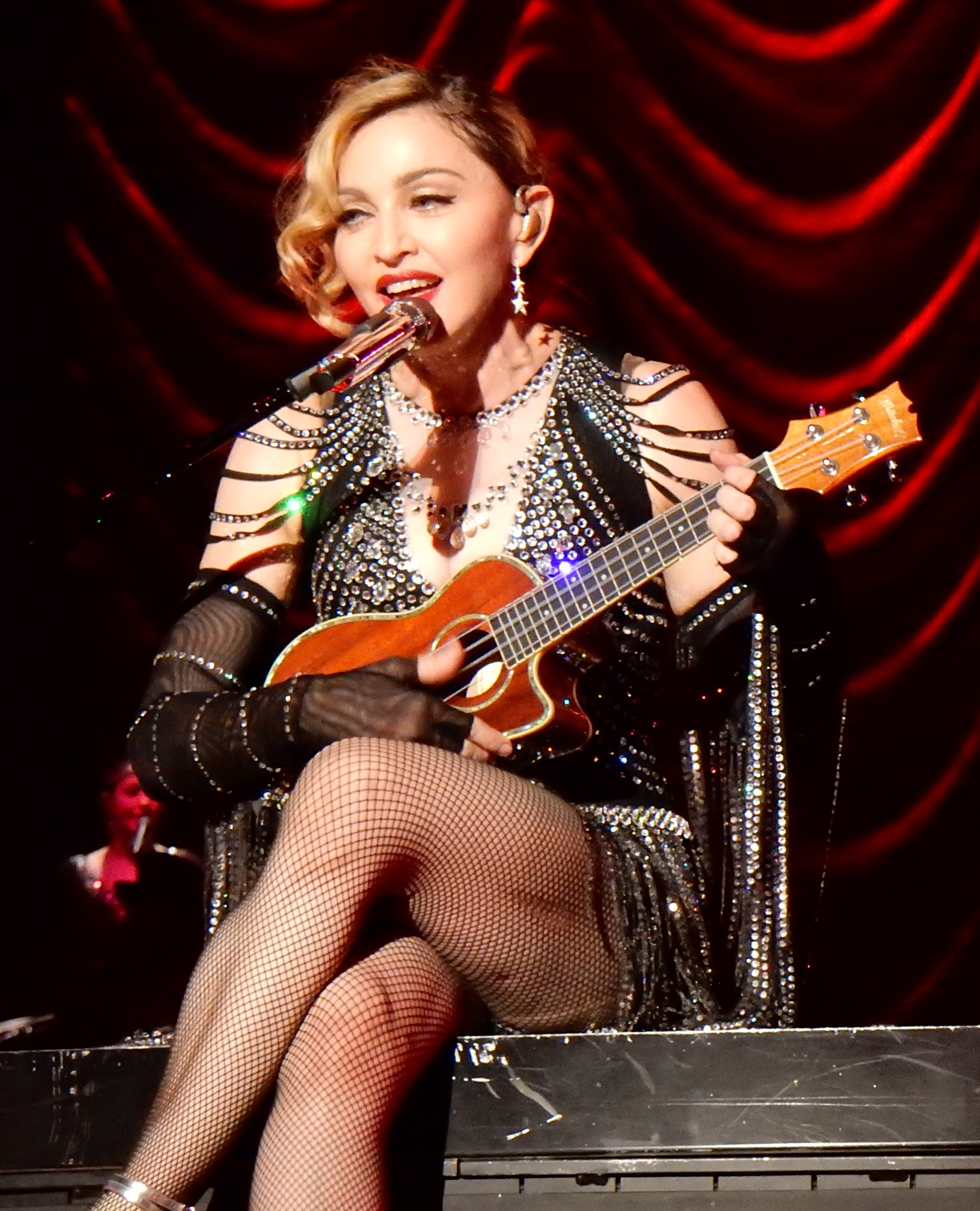
Madonna performing "La Vie en rose" during the Rebel Heart Tour. Her live singing on the video release was critically acclaimed.

Markos Papadatos from the Digital Journal gave the album a rating of A describing the release as a "must for any die-hard fan of Madonna". Jeffrey Kaufman from Blu-ray.com gave a rating of four stars out of five for the release, saying that Madonna knows "how to provide amazing visuals for a Blu-ray concert release to accompany an interesting if kind of random assortment of tunes from her by now pretty long career." He further complimented the production, the video and the audio quality of the album, recommending it for being "constantly over the top and often quite breathtaking". Writing for Decider, Benjamin H. Smith opined that "the 2017 concert film, Madonna: Rebel Heart Tour, shows the Material Girl hasn't lost any steps now that she's more a grande dame [...] what she debatably lacks as a vocalist, she has always made up for with her ability to craft her persona, like David Bowie, altering it to keep up with the latest trends, but always maintaining her singular identity", but pointed out that "it was her ‘80s songbook that got the biggest response".

Daryl Deino from Inquisitr gave a positive review for the live album of the release, but criticized its DVD and Blu-ray versions for poor editing. He named Rebel Heart Tour Madonna's best live album to date and found it superior to the DVD and Blu-ray. He also complimented Madonna's live, unprocessed vocals on the album, praising in particular her cover of "La Vie en rose", calling it "the best vocal performance of her career so far [...] this is a song nobody could imagine [Madonna] covering at the beginning of her career. Now, it sounds natural". Although the singer's voice sounded "strained" to Deino during the dance sequences, it was not noticeable in the video versions since "Madonna's dancing is the key element in these performances". He ended his review saying that the "whole album makes you want to run to a Madonna concert, and that's exactly what a live album is supposed to do."

Simon Button from Attitude commended the release, describing it as "a work of theatrical genius", complimenting the dancers, Madonna's camaraderie onstage and the "smoke-and-mirrors element" in the product. However, he criticized the inclusion of the Tears of a Clown show, finding it to be "as much a car crash as the two hours of the Rebel Heart Tour are a triumph". Writing for DVD Movie Guide, Colin Jacobson felt that "as a concert, Madonna's Rebel Heart Tour falls into the 'good but not great' category. As a video, it disappoints because it fails to effectively recapture the live experience". Roger Wink, from music portal Vintage Vinyl News, was critical of the CD release; "much of the allure of a Madonna show is the visual aspect which doesn't come across on CD, so the DVD/Blu-Ray is probably a much better experience but that doesn't excuse the low points, and there are many of them, in the listening experience".

== Commercial reception ==
In the United Kingdom, Rebel Heart Tour sold 1,993 copies in its first week of release, and debuted at number 42 on the UK Albums Chart. In the United States, Rebel Heart Tour failed to chart on the Billboard 200, but reached numbers 20 and 45 on the Digital Album and Top Album Sales charts for one week each, respectively. The album also reached number two on the Top Music Video chart, being kept from the pole position by Alan Jackson's Precious Memories: Live at the Ryman (2009). Rebel Heart Tour had sold 3,848 copies in the US as of September 24, 2017.

Rebel Heart Tour reached number one in Mexico, and placed at number 69 on the year-end chart. In France, the live album peaked at number 20 on the French Albums Chart selling 1,921 copies, while the video versions topped the French DVD Charts selling 5,044 units in its first-week. The Syndicat National de l'Édition Phonographique (SNEP) certified the video Platinum for selling over 15,000 units. Across the rest of Europe, the album reached the top ten of the charts in Belgium (Flanders and Wallonia), Germany, Hungary, Italy, Portugal and Spain. At the 32nd Japan Gold Disc Award, Rebel Heart Tour won in the category of Best Music Video for Western Artists.

== Track listing ==
Double-CD track listing of Rebel Heart Tour (disc 1)
No.	Title	Writer(s)	Length
1.	"Rebel Heart Tour Intro"		3:57
2.	"Iconic"	Madonna; Toby Gad; Maureen McDonald; Larry Griffin Jr.; Chancelor Bennett; Dacoury Natche; Michael Tucker	4:39
3.	"Bitch I'm Madonna"	Madonna; Thomas Pentz; Ariel Rechtshaid; McDonald; Gad; Onika Maraj; Sophie Xeon	3:39
4.	"Burning Up"	Madonna	4:28
5.	"Holy Water" / "Vogue"	Madonna; Martin Kierszenbaum; Natalia Keery-Fisher; Mike Dean; Kanye West; Ernest Brown / Madonna; Shep Pettibone	6:05
6.	"Devil Pray"	Madonna; Tim Bergling; Arash Pournouri; Carl Falk; Rami Yacoub; Savan Kotecha; Dacoury Natche; Michael Tucker	4:17
7.	"Body Shop"	Madonna; Gad; McDonald; Griffin Jr.; Natche; Tucker	4:07
8.	"True Blue"	Madonna; Stephen Bray	3:00
9.	"Deeper and Deeper"	Madonna; Pettibone; Anthony Shimkin	4:52
10.	"HeartBreakCity"	Madonna; Bergling; Pournouri; Tobias Jimson; Michel Flygare; Paloma Stoecker; Salem Al Fakir; Magnus Lidehall; Vincent Pontare	4:38
11.	"Like a Virgin"	Tom Kelly; Billy Steinberg	4:52

Double-CD track listing of Rebel Heart Tour (disc 2)
No.	Title	Writer(s)	Length
1.	"Living for Love"	Madonna; Pentz; McDonald; Gad; Rechtshaid	5:11
2.	"La Isla Bonita"	Madonna; Patrick Leonard; Bruce Gaitsch	5:03
3.	"Dress You Up" / "Into the Groove"	Andrea LaRusso; Peggy Stanziale / Madonna; Bray	5:35
4.	"Rebel Heart"	Madonna; Bergling; Pournouri; Fakir; Lidehall; Pontare	3:47
5.	"Music"	Madonna; Mirwais Ahmadzaï	3:36
6.	"Candy Shop"	Madonna; Pharrell Williams	2:54
7.	"Material Girl"	Peter Brown; Robert Rans	4:02
8.	"La Vie en rose"	Édith Piaf; Louiguy	3:17
9.	"Unapologetic Bitch"	Madonna; Pentz; Shelco Garcia; Bryan Orellana; McDonald; Gad	7:06
10.	"Holiday"	Curtis Hudson; Lisa Stevens	5:44
11.	"Like a Prayer" (Bonus track)	Madonna; Leonard	4:12
Total length:			99:01

Single-CD / vinyl track listing of Rebel Heart Tour
No.	Title	Length
1.	"Rebel Heart Tour Intro"
2.	"Iconic"
3.	"Bitch I'm Madonna"
4.	"Burning Up"
5.	"Holy Water" / "Vogue"
6.	"Devil Pray"
7.	"Deeper and Deeper"
8.	"HeartBreakCity"
9.	"Living for Love"
10.	"La Isla Bonita"
11.	"Rebel Heart"
12.	"Candy Shop"
13.	"Unapologetic Bitch"
14.	"Holiday"

DVD / Blu-ray track listing of Rebel Heart Tour
No.	Title	Writer(s)	Length
1.	"Rebel Heart Tour Intro"
2.	"Iconic"	Madonna; Gad; McDonald; Griffin Jr.; Bennett; Natche; Tucker
3.	"Bitch I'm Madonna"	Madonna; Pentz; Rechtshaid; McDonald; Gad; Maraj; Long
4.	"Burning Up"	Madonna
5.	"Holy Water" / "Vogue"	Madonna; Kierszenbaum; Keery-Fisher; Dean; West; Brown / Madonna; Pettibone
6.	"Devil Pray"	Madonna; Bergling; Pournouri; Falk; Yacoub; Kotecha; Natche; Tucker
7.	"Messiah" (Video interlude)	Madonna; Bergling; Pournouri; Fakir; Lidehall; Pontare
8.	"Body Shop"	Madonna; Gad; McDonald; Griffin Jr.; Natche; Tucker
9.	"True Blue"	Madonna; Bray
10.	"Deeper and Deeper"	Madonna; Pettibone; Shimkin
11.	"HeartBreakCity"	Madonna; Bergling; Pournouri; Jimson; Flygare; Stoecker; Fakir; Lidehall; Pontare
12.	"Like a Virgin"	Kelly; Steinberg
13.	"S.E.X." (Video interlude)	Madonna; Gad; McDonald; Griffin Jr.; Dean; West; Brown
14.	"Living for Love"	Madonna; Pentz; McDonald; Gad; Rechtshaid
15.	"La Isla Bonita"	Madonna; Leonard; Gaitsch
16.	"Dress You Up" / "Into the Groove"	LaRusso; Stanziale / Madonna; Bray
17.	"Rebel Heart"	Madonna; Bergling; Pournouri; Fakir; Lidehall; Pontare
18.	"Illuminati" (Video interlude)	Madonna; McDonald; Gad; Griffin Jr.; Dean; West; Brown; Jacques Webster
19.	"Music"	Madonna; Ahmadzaï
20.	"Candy Shop"	Madonna; Williams
21.	"Material Girl"	Brown; Rans
22.	"La Vie en Rose"	Piaf; Louiguy
23.	"Unapologetic Bitch"	Madonna; Pentz; Shelco Garcia; Bryan Orellana; McDonald; Gad
24.	"Holiday"	Hudson; Stevens
25.	"An excerpt from Tears of a Clown"
26.	"Like a Prayer"	Madonna; Leonard
Total length:			138:16

Japanese DVD / Blu-ray track listing of Rebel Heart Tour (bonus track)
No.	Title	Writer(s)	Length
27.	"Take a Bow"	Madonna; Kenneth Edmonds

Additional notes

- "S.E.X." contains elements of "Justify My Love" written by Lenny Kravitz, Ingrid Chavez and Madonna, and performed by Madonna.
- DVD / Blu-ray version also includes the a cappella performance of "Diamonds Are a Girl's Best Friend, written by Jule Styne and Leo Robin, performed between "La Vie en rose" and "Unapologetic Bitch".
- "Holiday" contains elements of "Take Me to the Mardi Gras" written by Paul Simon and performed by Bob James.

== Personnel ==
Credits adapted from the liner notes of Rebel Heart Tour.

- Madonna – creator, vocals, guitar, ukulele
- Kiley Dean – backing vocals
- Nicki Richards – backing vocals
- Nathan Rissman – director
- Danny B. Tull – director, lead editor
- Jamie King – stage director
- Al Gurdon – director of photography
- Ric Lipson – stage designer
- Arianne Phillips – costume designer
- Alexander Hammer – lead editor
- Sean Spuehler – vocal mixing engineer
- Arthur Fogel – executive producer
- Guy Oseary – executive producer
- Sara Zambreno – executive producer
- Geoff Kempin – executive producer for Eagle Rock Entertainment
- Terry Shand – executive producer for Eagle Rock Entertainment
- Brian Frasier Moore – drums
- Monte Pittman – guitar, ukulele
- Ric'key Pageot – keyboards, accordion
- Kevin Antunes – music director, keyboards
- Kevin Mazur – photography
- Jonathan Lia – producer

== Charts ==
=== Weekly charts ===
Weekly album chart peaks of Rebel Heart Tour
Chart (2017–2022)	Peak position
Australian Albums (ARIA)	20
Belgian Albums (Ultratop Flanders)	8
Belgian Albums (Ultratop Wallonia)	9
Danish Vinyl (Hitlisten)	11
Dutch Albums (Album Top 100)	14
French Albums (SNEP)	33
Finnish Physical Albums (Suomen virallinen lista)	5
German Albums (Offizielle Top 100)	8
Greek Albums (IFPI)	12
Hungarian Albums (MAHASZ)	7
Italian Albums (FIMI)	4
Japanese Albums (Oricon)	112
Mexican Albums (AMPROFON)	1
Polish Albums (ZPAV)	12
Portuguese Albums (AFP)	3
Scottish Albums (Official Charts)	28
Spanish Albums (Promusicae)	4
Swedish Vinyl (Sverigetopplistan)	8
Swiss Albums (Schweizer Hitparade)	30
UK Albums (Official Charts)	42
US Digital Albums (Billboard)	20
US Top Album Sales (Billboard)	45

Weekly video chart peaks of Rebel Heart Tour
Chart (2017)	Peak position
Argentine Music DVD (CAPIF)	1
Australian Music DVD (ARIA)	1
Austrian Music DVD (Ö3 Austria)	1
Belgian Music DVD (Ultratop Flanders)	1
Belgian Music DVD (Ultratop Wallonia)	1
Dutch Music DVD (MegaCharts)	1
French Music DVD (SNEP)	1
German Music DVD (GfK Entertainment)	2
Japanese Music Blu-ray (Oricon)	5
Japanese Music DVD (Oricon)	8
Irish Music DVD (IRMA)	1
Portuguese Music DVD (AFP)	1
Spanish Music DVD (Promusicae)	1
Swedish Music DVD (Sverigetopplistan)	1
Swiss Music DVD (Schweizer Hitparade)	1
UK Music Videos (Official Charts)	1
US Music Video Sales (Billboard)	2

=== Monthly charts ===
Monthly chart peaks of Rebel Heart Tour
Chart (2017)	Peak position
Argentine Albums (CAPIF)	6
Polish Albums (ZPAV)	41

=== Year-end charts ===
2017 year-end album chart positions of Rebel Heart Tour
Chart (2017)	Position
Hungarian Albums & Compilations (MAHASZ)	83
Mexican Albums (AMPROFON)	69

2017 year-end video chart positions of Rebel Heart Tour
Chart (2017)	Position
Australian Music DVD (ARIA)	16
Belgian Music DVD (Ultratop Flanders)	8
Belgian Music DVD (Ultratop Wallonia)	4
Dutch Music DVD (MegaCharts)	12
Swedish Music DVD (Sverigetopplistan)	11

2018 year-end video chart positions of Rebel Heart Tour
Chart (2018)	Position
Belgian Music DVD (Ultratop Flanders)	30
Belgian Music DVD (Ultratop Wallonia)	23
Dutch Music DVD (MegaCharts)	31
Swedish Music DVD (Sverigetopplistan)	47

2019 year-end video chart positions of Rebel Heart Tour
Chart (2019)	Position
Portuguese Music DVD (AFP)	76

2020 year-end video chart positions of Rebel Heart Tour
Chart (2020)	Position
Portuguese Music DVD (AFP)	33

2022 year-end video chart positions of Rebel Heart Tour
Chart (2022)	Position
Portuguese Music DVD (AFP)	72

== Certification and sales ==
Region	Certification	Certified units/sales
Album
France (SNEP)	Gold	50,000^{‡}
United States	—	3,848
Video
France (SNEP)	Platinum	10,000^{*}
^{*} Sales figures based on certification alone.^{‡} Sales+streaming figures based on certification alone.

== Release history ==
Region	Date	Format(s)	Distributor	Ref.
Australia	September 15, 2017	DVD; Blu-ray; DVD+CD; Blu-ray+CD; Digital download	Eagle Vision; Eagle; Universal Music Australia	
Brazil	September 15, 2017	Digital download; Digital download (video)	Eagle Vision; Eagle; Universal Music Brazil	
Brazil	September 20, 2017	2-CD	Eagle Vision; Eagle; Universal Music Brazil	
Brazil	September 30, 2017	DVD	Eagle Vision; Eagle; Universal Music Brazil	
Germany	September 15, 2017	2-CD; DVD; DVD+CD; Blu-ray+CD; Digital download	Eagle Vision; Eagle	
Japan	September 15, 2017	2-CD; DVD; Blu-ray; Digital download	Eagle Vision; Eagle; Universal Music Japan	
United Kingdom	September 15, 2017	2-CD; DVD; Blu-ray; DVD+CD; Blu-ray+CD; Digital download	Eagle Vision; Eagle	
United States	September 15, 2017	2-CD; DVD+CD; Blu-ray+CD; Digital download	Eagle Vision; Eagle	
United States	September 9, 2022	2-LP	Mercury Studios	

== See also ==
- List of number-one albums of 2017 (Mexico)
