= David Chalmin =

- Origin: Paris, France
- Genres: Rock, Experimental, Classical
- Occupations: Producer, Composer, Musician
- Instruments: Electric guitar, Voice
- Years active: 2005–present
- Labels: Ici d'Ailleurs, LFO~La Fabrique des Ondes, KML Recordings
- Website: www.davidchalmin.com

David Chalmin is a French composer, producer, sound engineer and musician. He's a member of the trio Triple Sun.

His collaborations extend from classical music to experimental rock: Katia and Marielle Labèque, Thom Yorke, The National, Madonna, Rufus Wainwright, Matt Elliott, Kalakan, Shannon Wright, and others.

His work as a composer have been performed in places such as Walt Disney Concert Hall, Philharmonie de Paris, Salle Pleyel, WDR Rundfunkorchester Köln, Kings Place in London, and Koerner Hall at the Toronto Royal Conservatory.

Chalmin runs two recording studios, Studio K Paris and Studio LFO in the Basque Region.

== Discography ==
- 2006 : Red Velvet (KML Recordings)
- 2007 : Dimension X (with Massimo Pupillo ZU, and Chris Corsano) (KML Recordings)
- 2008 : B For Bang - Across The Universe of Languages (KML Recordings)
- 2011 : B For Bang - Rewires The Beatles (KML Recordings)
- 2013 : Minimalist Dream House (KML Recordings)
- 2014 : UBUNOIR (Debout!)
- 2016 : Triple Sun - The City Lies In Ruins (Consouling Sounds)
- 2017 : Katia & Marielle Labèque - Love Stories (KML Recordings/Deutsche Grammophon)
- 2018 : Moondog (KML Recordings/Deutsche Grammophon)
- 2019 : David Chalmin - La Terre Invisible (Ici d'Ailleurs)
- 2022 : Innocence (Yotanka)
- 2025 : Electric Fields (with Barbara Hannigan and Katia and Marielle Labèque) (Alpha Classics)

== Productions ==
=== Katia & Marielle Labèque ===
- 2009 : Erik Satie
- 2009 : Shape Of My heart (feat. Sting)
- 2010 : The New CD box
- 2011 : Gershwin-Bernstein, Rhapsody in Blue - West Side Story
- 2011 : Nazareno
- 2013 : Minimalist Dream House
- 2015 : Sisters
- 2016 : Invocations
- 2018 : El Chan

=== Matt Elliott ===
- 2013 : Only Myocardial Infarction Can Break Your Heart (Ici d'ailleurs...)
- 2016 : The Calm Before (Ici d'ailleurs...)

=== Others ===
- 2010 : Kalakan - Kalakan
- 2011 : Nadéah - Venus Gets Even
- 2015 : Angélique Ionatos - Reste la lumière
- 2015 : Gaspar Claus & Pedro Soler
- 2016 : Shannon Wright - Division
- 2017 : Zu - Jhator (orchestra recording)
- 2017 : The National - Sleep Well Beast (orchestra recording)
