= MDNA World Tour (album) =

2013 live album by Madonna

Live album / video by Madonna
- Released: September 6, 2013
- Recorded: November 19–20, 2012
- Venues: American Airlines Arena (Miami, Florida)
- Genre: Electronic
- Length: 114:39
- Label: Interscope
- Directors: Danny B. Tull; Stéphane Sennour
- Producers: Madonna; Nicola Doring

Madonna chronology
The Complete Studio Albums (1983–2008) (2012)	MDNA World Tour (2013)	Rebel Heart (2015)

Madonna video chronology
Sticky & Sweet Tour (2010)	MDNA World Tour (2013)	Rebel Heart Tour (2017)

MDNA World Tour is the fourth live album by American singer and songwriter Madonna. It was released on September 6, 2013, by Interscope Records as a full concert on all formats including a double-disc CD, DVD, and Blu-ray. Madonna had embarked on the MDNA Tour for promotion of her twelfth studio album MDNA. The tour was a commercial success although it courted a number of controversies. The performances at the American Airlines Arena in Miami, Florida during the North American leg of the MDNA Tour were documented for video release. The recording was directed by Danny B. Tull and Stephane Sennour who included footage from other shows of the tour.

Madonna had spent six months editing the footage from the films and together with Tull and Sennour, she developed the video for the songs she had performed as a mini-movie. Shot as a documentary, MDNA World Tour included the best shots available from different locations of the tour, while emphasizing Madonna's impact on the younger generation of artists. Prior to the release, a concert television special, Madonna: The MDNA Tour, was broadcast in the United States by Epix on June 22, 2013. A premiere took place at the Paris Theater, in New York City the same month.

The release received mixed reviews from critics, with one group of reviewers commending the technicality and the visuals attached with the show, while others noting the absence of Madonna's hit songs from the set list. After the release, news outlets around the world wrote about bad manufacturing of the CD and DVD, with many buyers reportedly choosing to return their purchase. Within a week Interscope released a statement, redacting the Blu-ray discs in the United States.

MDNA World Tour reached the top of the album chart in Hungary, and top-ten in France, Italy, and Spain, but it failed to achieve high chart positions similar to the singer's previous live albums in the United States and United Kingdom. However, the video version enjoyed more success, reaching number one in most DVD charts worldwide and earning triple platinum in Brazil, platinum in Canada and Portugal, and gold in Poland. The release topped the US Billboard Top Music Videos chart with sales of 11,000 copies, becoming her sixth consecutive and tenth video to top the chart—the most for any artist.

== Background and tour ==
On March 23, 2012, Madonna released her twelfth studio album, entitled MDNA, by Interscope Records. The singer worked with a variety of producers such as Alle Benassi, Benny Benassi, Demolition Crew, Free School, Michael Malih, Indiigo, William Orbit and Martin Solveig on the album. An electronic album, MDNA lyrically explores themes such as partying, love for music, infatuation, as well as heartbreak, revenge and separation. The album received generally positive reviews from music critics. Upon its release, it debuted at number one in many countries worldwide, including Australia, Canada, Italy, Spain, the United Kingdom and the United States.

To promote the album, Madonna embarked on the MDNA Tour, which was her ninth concert tour. The tour visited America, Europe and the Middle East, while also marking the singer's first performances in the United Arab Emirates, Ukraine, Scotland and Colombia. Described by her as "the journey of a soul from darkness to light", the MDNA Tour was divided into four sections: Transgression, where guns and violence was the main theme, Prophecy, where a mix of joyful songs that bring people together are performed, Masculine/Feminine, a combination of sensuality and fashion with a few of Madonna's classic songs performed in a French Cabaret-style, and Redemption, which Madonna labelled as "a big party and celebration". The tour received positive reviews, but courted many controversial subjects such as violence, firearms, human rights, nudity and politics. Nevertheless, it was a commercial success and many venues were instantly sold out. After completion, it was dubbed the highest-grossing tour of 2012 by Billboard. Total gross was $305.2 million from 88 sold-out shows, becoming the tenth highest-grossing tour of all time and surpassing Celine Dion's Taking Chances World Tour as the second highest-grossing tour among female artists, behind Madonna's own Sticky & Sweet Tour.

== Development and release ==
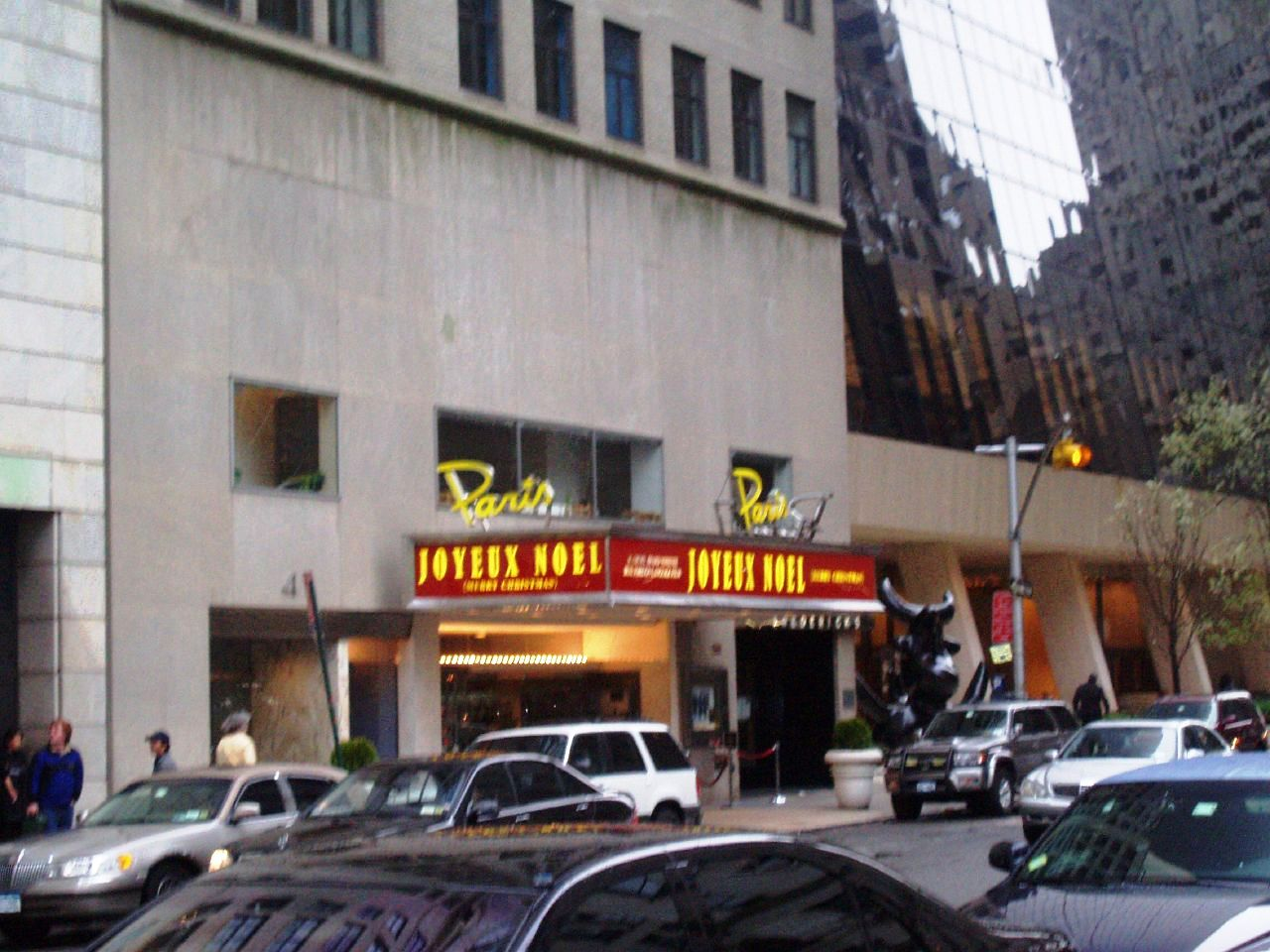
The premiere for the documentary took place at the Paris Theater in Manhattan, New York City.

Initially, the filming of the concert was planned for the shows in Colombia, but due to conflicts with the directors' schedule, those shows were not filmed. Instead, Madonna announced on her Facebook page that the November 19 and 20 shows in Miami, at the American Airlines Arena, would be filmed for the upcoming tour DVD and Blu-ray release. After accepting the award for Top Touring Artist at the 2013 Billboard Music Awards, Madonna confirmed that she had just finished editing the DVD of the concert, with Billboard predicting the video release to be in September 2013. It was officially announced by Madonna's website that the video album for the tour will be released on August 26, 2013, by Live Nation and Interscope Records; the date was later changed to September 6 and 9 for non-US countries and September 10 for US. It documented the November 19 and 20 shows at the American Airlines Arena, but also will include footage from other concert dates. The documentary was directed by Danny B. Tull and Stephane Sennour—who also directed the YouTube concert special MDNA: Live à l'Olympia and the behind-the-scenes documentary Inside the DNA of MDNA—and was produced by Madonna. MDNA World Tour is Madonna's tenth live video album and was released on both DVD and Blu-ray. Madonna had spent six months editing the footage from the films and together with Tull and Sennour she constructed each of the performances in the video as a mini-movie.

According to Entertainment Weekly, MDNA World Tour shed light on the impact Madonna has had on the younger generation of artists, dancers, and general fans "who refuse to conform for conformity's sake". Tull took the best moments from the 88 different concerts of the tour, to create a cohesive documentary. He recalled that there were numerous footage available from the tour and they had to find the "perfect" shot for Madonna. He gave an example that the performance of "Like a Prayer" had cuts from 50 countries alone. "It was really intense. I think I looked down one day and I was like, 'Oh, my fingers are about to fall off'. But it was worth it", Tull concluded. A preview for the DVD was first shown at the Billboard Music Awards and another preview was released in June 2013, showing the singer performing "Give Me All Your Luvin'" on the tour, the lead single from MDNA. Another video showed Madonna auditioning for the dancers, while singing an acoustic version of her 2001 single, "Don't Tell Me".

A television broadcast of the concert, titled Madonna: The MDNA Tour, aired on Epix in the United States on June 22, 2013. The concert premiered at 8 pm. EST on Epix's TV network and online at EpixHD.com and on Epix apps. On June 18, the concert special had a world premiere screening at the Paris Theater, in New York City, with Madonna attending the event in a press conference with the media, celebrities, and fans. A contest was released just for US residents, who had the chance to win two invitations for the special event. The singer wore a black tuxedo and a top hat to the premiere, the ensemble being a tribute to actress Marlene Dietrich and her similar attire in the 1930 film, Morocco. The singer had a Q&A session and also showed a trailer of her secretprojectrevolution film with photographer Steven Klein.

== Critical reception ==
Professional ratings
Review scores
Source	Rating
AllMusic	3/5 stars
Dallas Voice	4/5 stars
Gaffa	3/6 stars
Jenesaispop	7.6/10 stars
The Republic	3.5/5 stars
North Jersey Media Group	2.5/5 stars

Arnold Wayne Jones from the Dallas Voice gave the album four out of five stars, writing that the show "has all of the Material Girl's majesty and fetishistic eroticism, merged with lots of disturbing, violent imagery and a huge catalog of songs". Jones concluded that Madonna was more provocative than before with the release. Chuck Campbell from The Republic gave the album three and a half stars out of five, writing that "an ambitious woman like Madonna will not let herself become a nostalgia act". He added that Madonna makes that clear every time she goes on tour: "she's living in the moment, and she's all about her newest material." The Advocate's review for the release was positive, saying that the DVD affirms the fact that Madonna's "musical reign continues". Entertainment Focus' Pip Ellwood-Hughes felt that the highlights of the record were the live performances of "Human Nature" and "Like a Prayer". He concluded the review by saying that " Making perfect use of her dancers, the video screens and the sets, the MDNA World Tour is one of [Madonna's] most spectacular to date and she still performs with the passion and the energy she always has done. If you went to the show then get your copy of this and treat it like a souvenir. If you didn't you need to check it out as it's one of the best shows she's ever done."

Stephen Thomas Erlewine from AllMusic awarded the release three out of five stars, saying that "there are unexpected musical moments that do make MDNA World Tour worth hearing", including the performance of "Like a Virgin" and "Like a Prayer". However, he felt that the CD release was unnecessary since the album would be a better experience with its video. The North Jersey Media Group gave the DVD 2.5 starts out of five, saying that Madonna felt to be "overly" attached to her contemporary songs than her classic releases. They added "that plodding through overlong arrangements of inconsequential songs — from the annoyingly vocoder-treated 'Revolver' early to the throwaway dance cut 'Celebration' at the end — will leave listeners wondering why so many substantial hits were given only a nod, if anything at all." A review by Kevin Taft in online website "Edge on the Net" was overall negative. Taft noticed that Madonna's vocals were altered and mixed so much that it sounded disembodied and did not match the singer's lips. He was "shocked" to find that the audio CDs also contained the badly mixed songs. The reviewer explained that "The choice to have the backing track turned down so low doesn't help much either. In fact, it makes it sound as if Madonna is on a cabaret stage with a five-piece band... For the six months it took Madge to edit her concert, one would wish she got her vocals to match her lips." However, Taft commended the overall show and the technical brilliance accompanying it.

== Mastering issues ==
In an online chat with website Reddit, Madonna addressed the concerns regarding the mastering issues with the DVD and Blu-ray in Europe, saying that she was horrified about the glitches and her record label was solving it. She concluded by saying that "[I] spent 6 months editing and doing the sound mix for the DVD the last thing I want to hear is that the fans aren't getting the fruits of my labor." On September 23, 2013, Interscope Records announced that they were recalling all the Blu-ray discs issued in US, after hearing continuous reports of glitches in the sound from consumers, adding that an "error in manufacturing" compromised the 5.1 audio of the discs. The announcement also added the following:

"Interscope Records would like to make consumers of Madonna's MDNA World Tour Blu-ray disc aware that the concert will be seen at its most optimal quality by properly adjusting the settings on your television to 'Normal/Movie' mode rather than 'Dynamic/Enhanced' mode. Older Blu-ray players or those without a firmware upgrade may experience glitches when navigating the Blu-ray menu. Follow the manufacturer's instructions to upgrade firmware.

== Commercial performance ==
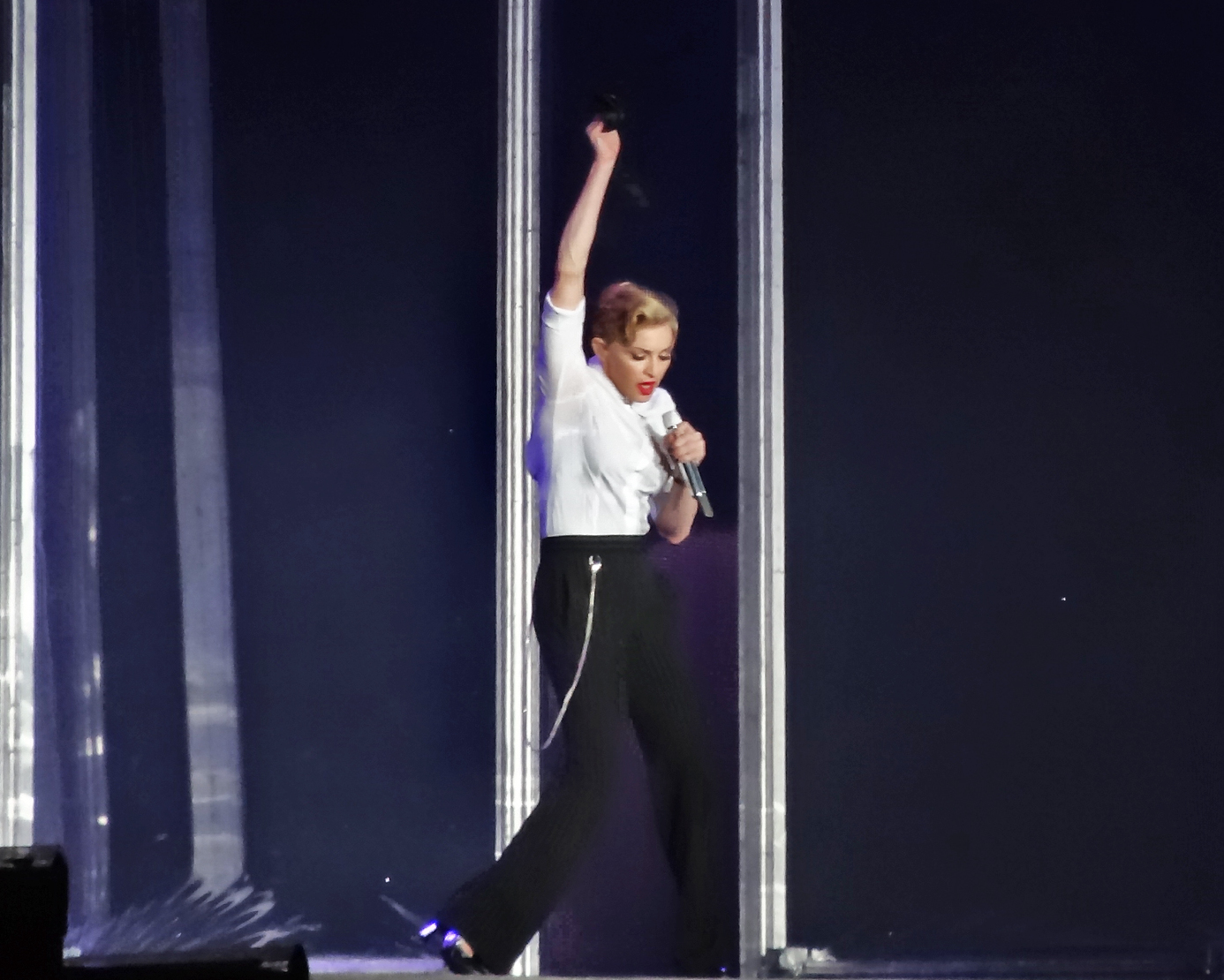
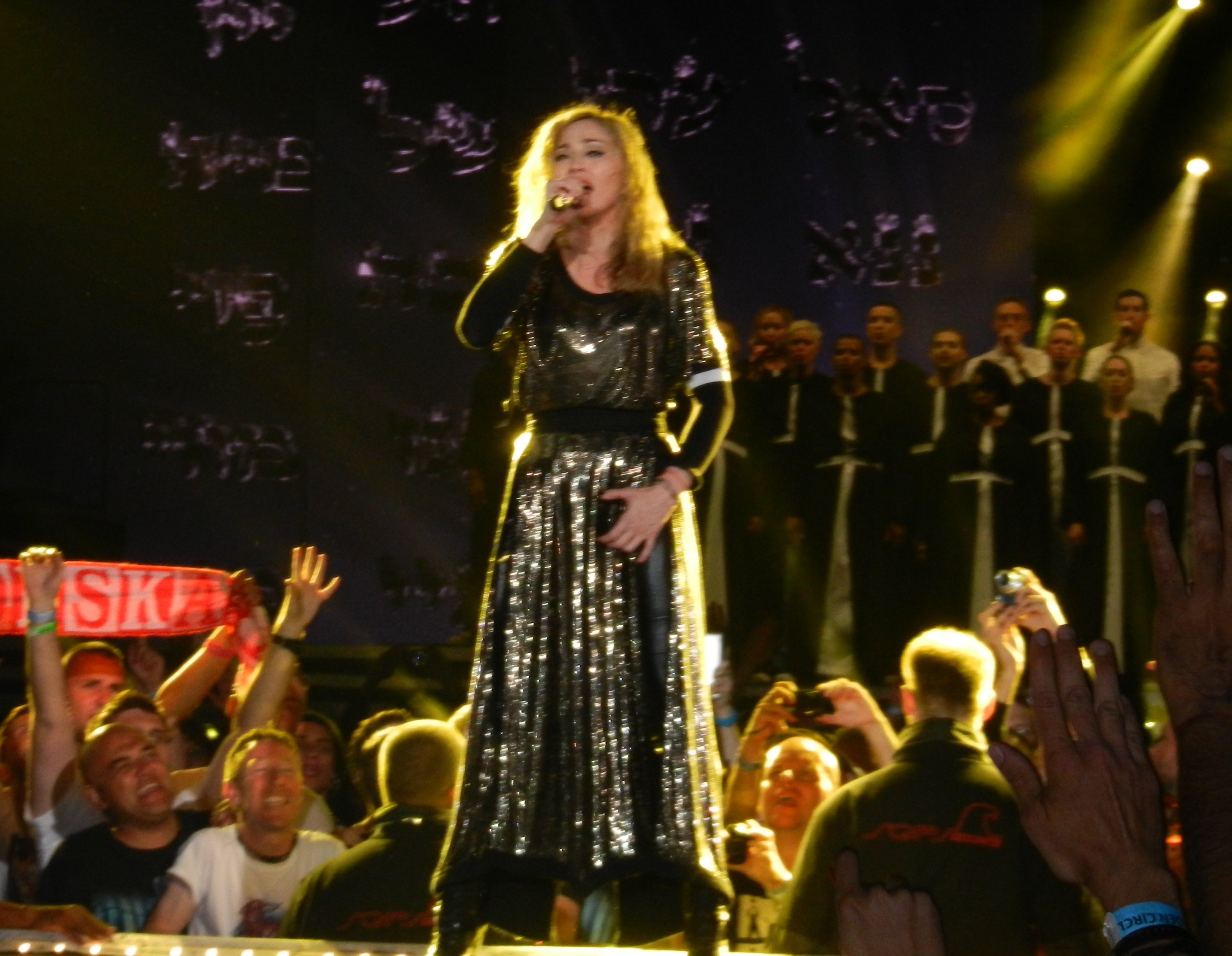
The performances of "Human Nature" (left) and "Like a Prayer" (right) were considered highlights of the DVD.

In the United States, MDNA World Tour failed to debut within the top-forty of the Billboard 200, unlike her previous live albums, and entered at number 90 with 4,000 copies sold becoming her 26th entry on the chart. However, it entered at number one on the Top Music Videos chart with sales of 11,000 copies, becoming her sixth consecutive and tenth video to top the chart—the most for any artist. MDNA World Tour was preceded by Madonna (four weeks at number-one in 1985), Madonna Live: The Virgin Tour (10 weeks in 1986), Ciao Italia: Live from Italy (eight weeks in 1988), The Immaculate Collection (four weeks in 1991), Drowned World Tour 2001 (one week in 2001), I'm Going to Tell You a Secret (two weeks in 2006), The Confessions Tour (two weeks in 2007), Celebration: The Video Collection (one week in 2009) and Sticky & Sweet Tour (one week in 2010). Keith Caulfield from Billboard noted that the debut on the Billboard 200 was with considerably lesser sales than the preceding album, Sticky & Sweet Tour, which entered the chart at number ten with sales of 28,000 copies and atop the Top Music Videos with 5,000 copies. Caulfield theorized that the only availability of MDNA World Tour as a digital album and CD on demand from Amazon.com hindered its ranking on the chart and issuing the album on the traditional music release formats of CD-DVD combo would have increased sales. The following week, MDNA World Tour held on to the top spot of the Top Music Videos chart, with an additional sales of 3,000 copies. MDNA World Tour became the 29th best selling music video on the year end tabulation of Billboard.

A midweek prediction by Music Week magazine had MDNA World Tour listed at position 37 of the UK Albums Chart. It ultimately debuted at number 55 on the chart with sales of 1,759 copies while topping the DVD chart of the country with bigger first week sales of 5,599 copies. MDNA World Tour became Madonna's first live album not to enter the top-twenty of the UK Albums Chart, after the top-twenty placements at number 18 (14,449 sales) with I'm Going to Tell You a Secret (2006), number seven (22,227 sales) with The Confessions Tour (2007) and number 17 (12,405 sales) with Sticky & Sweet Tour (2010). As of September 2017, it has sold 23,220 copies in the country. The album's highest placement was in Hungary, where it reached the top of the chart. It also attained top ten positions in France, Italy, Russia and Spain, while reaching top twenty in Poland and Portugal. Its lowest position was attained in Belgium Flanders region, where it failed to enter the top 100 of the Ultratop chart, reaching a peak of number 116. MDNA World Tour was successful on the DVD listings of most of the nations, reaching the top of the charts of 17 providers. However, in Australia the album version was disqualified from charting in the ARIA Albums Chart, but it reached the top of the DVD charts for the issue of September 16, 2013.

== Track listing ==
=== CD ===
MDNA World Tour – CD 1
No.	Title	Writer(s)	Note(s)	Length
1.	"Virgin Mary (Intro)"		Contains elements from "Psalm 91" and "Birjina Gaztetto Bat Zegoen", arranged and performed by the Kalakan Trio	5:46
2.	"Girl Gone Wild"	Madonna; Jenson Vaughan; Alessandro Benassi; Benny Benassi	Contains elements from "Material Girl" and "Give It 2 Me"	3:57
3.	"Revolver"	Madonna; Dwayne Carter; Justin Franks; Carlos Battery; Steven Battery; Brandon Kitchen		3:52
4.	"Gang Bang"	Madonna; William Orbit; Priscilla Hamilton; Keith Harris; Jean-Baptiste Kouame; Michael Penniman; Demacio Castellon; Stephen Kozmeniuk		5:54
5.	"Papa Don't Preach"	Brian Elliott; Madonna^{[a]}		1:50
6.	"Hung Up"	Madonna; Stuart Price; Benny Andersson; Bjoern Ulvaeus	Contains elements from "Girl Gone Wild"	3:47
7.	"I Don't Give A"	Madonna; Martin Solveig; Onika Miraj; Julien Jabre		5:27
8.	"Best Friend (Video Interlude)"	Madonna; A. Benassi; M. Benassi	Contains elements from "Heartbeat"	3:19
9.	"Express Yourself"	Madonna; Stephen Bray	Contains elements from "She's Not Me"	4:06
10.	"Give Me All Your Luvin'"	Madonna; Martin Solveig; Miraj; Maya Arulpragasam; Michael Tordjman		4:11
11.	"Turn Up the Radio"	Madonna; Martin Solveig; Tordjman; Jade Williams		3:58
12.	"Open Your Heart"	Madonna; Gardner Cole; Peter Rafelson	Includes "Sagarra Jo", arranged and performed by the Kalakan Trio	8:51
13.	"Masterpiece"	Madonna; Julie Frost; Jimmy Harry		4:32
Total length:				59:30

MDNA World Tour – CD 2
No.	Title	Writer(s)	Note(s)	Length
1.	"Justify My Love (Video Interlude)"	Lenny Kravitz; Ingrid Chavez; Madonna^{[a]}		3:34
2.	"Vogue"	Madonna; Shep Pettibone		4:08
3.	"Erotica Candy Shop"	Madonna; Pharrell Williams; Michael Kelly	Contains elements from "Candy Shop, "Ashamed of Myself" and "Erotica"	4:40
4.	"Human Nature"	Madonna; Dave Hall; Kevin McKenzie; Shawn McKenzie; Michael Deering		4:08
5.	"Like a Virgin Waltz"	Tom Kelly; Billy Steinberg; Abel Korzeniowski	Contains elements from "Like a Virgin" and "Evgeni's Waltz"	5:15
6.	"Love Spent"	Madonna; Orbit; Ryan Buendia; Kouame; Hamilton; Alain Whyte; Michael McHenry		4:47
7.	"Nobody Knows Me (Video Interlude)"	Madonna; Mirwais Ahmadzaï		3:36
8.	"I'm Addicted"	Madonna; A. Benassi; M. Benassi		4:42
9.	"I'm a Sinner"	Madonna; Orbit; Kouame	Contains elements from "Cyberraga"	6:45
10.	"Like a Prayer"	Madonna; Patrick Leonard	Includes "De Treville-n Azken Hitzak", arranged and performed by the Kalakan Trio	6:10
11.	"Celebration"	Madonna; Paul Oakenfold; Ian Green; Ciaran Gribbin	Contains elements from "Girl Gone Wild" and "Give It 2 Me"	7:24
Total length:				55:09

=== Blu-ray / DVD ===
MDNA World Tour – Visual
No.	Title	Writer(s)	Note(s)	Length
1.	"Virgin Mary (Intro)"		Contains elements from "Psalm 91" and "Birjina Gaztetto Bat Zegoen", arranged and performed by the Kalakan Trio	5:46
2.	"Girl Gone Wild"	Madonna; Jenson Vaughan; Alessandro Benassi; Benny Benassi	Contains elements from "Material Girl" and "Give It 2 Me"	3:57
3.	"Revolver"	Madonna; Dwayne Carter; Justin Franks; Carlos Battery; Steven Battery; Brandon Kitchen		3:52
4.	"Gang Bang"	Madonna; William Orbit; Priscilla Hamilton; Keith Harris; Jean-Baptiste Kouame; Michael Penniman; Demacio Castellon; Stephen Kozmeniuk		5:54
5.	"Papa Don't Preach"	Brian Elliott; Madonna^{[a]}		1:50
6.	"Hung Up"	Madonna; Stuart Price; Benny Andersson; Bjoern Ulvaeus	Contains elements from "Girl Gone Wild"	3:47
7.	"I Don't Give A"	Madonna; Martin Solveig; Onika Miraj; Julien Jabre		5:27
8.	"Best Friend (Video Interlude)"	Madonna; A. Benassi; M. Benassi	Contains elements from "Heartbeat"	3:19
9.	"Express Yourself"	Madonna; Stephen Bray	Contains elements from "She's Not Me"	4:06
10.	"Give Me All Your Luvin'"	Madonna; Martin Solveig; Miraj; Maya Arulpragasam; Michael Tordjman		4:11
11.	"Turn Up the Radio"	Madonna; Martin Solveig; Tordjman; Jade Williams		3:58
12.	"Open Your Heart"	Madonna; Gardner Cole; Peter Rafelson	Includes "Sagarra Jo", arranged and performed by the Kalakan Trio	8:51
13.	"Masterpiece"	Madonna; Julie Frost; Jimmy Harry		4:32
14.	"Justify My Love (Video Interlude)"	Lenny Kravitz; Ingrid Chavez; Madonna^{[a]}		3:34
15.	"Vogue"	Madonna; Shep Pettibone		4:08
16.	"Erotic Candy Shop"	Madonna; Pharrell Williams; Michael Kelly	Contains elements from "Candy Shop, "Ashamed of Myself" and "Erotica"	4:40
17.	"Human Nature"	Madonna; Dave Hall; Kevin McKenzie; Shawn McKenzie; Michael Deering		4:08
18.	"Like a Virgin Waltz"	Tom Kelly; Billy Steinberg; Abel Korzeniowski	Contains elements from "Like a Virgin" and "Evgeni's Waltz"	5:15
19.	"Love Spent"	Madonna; Orbit; Ryan Buendia; Kouame; Hamilton; Alain Whyte; Michael McHenry		4:47
20.	"Nobody Knows Me (Video Interlude)"	Madonna; Mirwais Ahmadzai		3:36
21.	"I'm Addicted"	Madonna; A. Benassi; M. Benassi		4:42
22.	"I'm a Sinner"	Madonna; Orbit; Kouame	Contains elements from "Cyberraga"	6:45
23.	"Like a Prayer"	Madonna; Patrick Leonard	Includes "De Treville-n Azken Hitzak", arranged and performed by the Kalakan Trio	6:10
24.	"Celebration"	Madonna; Paul Oakenfold; Ian Green; Ciaran Gribbin	Contains elements from "Girl Gone Wild" and "Give It 2 Me"	7:24
25.	"Workshop"			19:06
Total length:				133:45

Notes

- ^{^a} signifies additional lyrics by
- Track list adapted from AllMusic.
- "Express Yourself" also contains a sample of Lady Gaga's song "Born This Way" but the use is not credited in the album's liner notes.

== Personnel ==
Credits adapted from MDNA World Tour liner notes:

- Madonna – creator, vocals, guitar, producer
- Kiley Dean – backing vocals
- Nicki Richards – backing vocals
- Kalakan Trio – backing band
- Monte Pittman – guitar
- Brian Frasier Moore – drums
- Ric'key Pageot – keyboards, upright piano
- Jason Yang – violin
- Kevin Antunes – music director, keyboards, programmer
- Danny B. Tull – director
- Stephane Sennour – director
- Michel Laprise – show director
- Anthony Talauega – show co-director
- Richmond Talauega – show co-director
- Tiffany Olson – associate director
- Smasher Desmedt – technical director
- Mark Ritchie – photography
- Arthur Fogel – executive producer
- Guy Oseary – executive producer
- Jake Berry – production manager
- Sean Spuehler – engineer
- Al Gurdon – lighting designer
- Arianne Phillips – costume designer
- Danny O'Bryen – line producer
- Jonathan Lia – line producer
- Mark Fisher – set designer
- Demo Castellon – sound designer
- Glenn Erwin – sound designer
- Kevin Antunes – sound designer
- Danny Tull – video editor

== Charts ==
=== Weekly album charts ===
Weekly album chart peaks of MDNA World Tour
Charts (2013)	Peak; position
Belgian Albums (Ultratop Flanders)	116
Belgian Albums (Ultratop Wallonia)	24
Croatian International Albums (HDU)	5
Czech Albums (ČNS IFPI)	4
Dutch Albums (Album Top 100)	50
French Albums (SNEP)	6
Greek Albums (IFPI)	19
Hungarian Albums (MAHASZ)	1
Irish Albums (IRMA)	66
Italian Albums (FIMI)	2
Polish Albums (ZPAV)	11
Portuguese Albums (AFP)	18
Quebec (ADISQ)	24
South Korean International Albums (Circle) Deluxe Version	39
Scottish Albums (Official Charts)	62
Spanish Albums (Promusicae)	4
UK Albums (Official Charts)	55
US Billboard 200	90

=== Monthly album charts ===
Monthly album chart peaks of MDNA World Tour
Charts (2013)	Peak; position
South Korean Albums (Gaon) Deluxe version	61
Uruguayan Albums (CUD)	16

=== Year-end album charts ===
2013 year-end album chart positions of MDNA World Tour
Charts (2013)	Position
Hungarian Albums (Mahasz)	78
Hungarian Albums & Compilations (Mahasz)	89

=== Weekly video charts ===
Weekly video chart peaks of MDNA World Tour
Charts (2013)	Peak position
Australian Music DVD (ARIA)	1
Austrian Music DVD (Ö3 Austria)	1
Belgian Music DVD (Ultratop Flanders)	1
Belgian Music DVD (Ultratop Wallonia)	1
Brazilian Music DVD (ABPD)	1
Denmark Music DVD (Tracklisten)	1
Dutch Music DVD (MegaCharts)	1
Finnish Music DVD (IFPI)	1
French Music DVD (SNEP)	1
Irish Music DVD (IRMA)	3
Italian Music DVD (FIMI)	1
Japanese Music DVD (Oricon)	15
Portuguese Music DVD (AFP)	1
Spanish Music DVD (Promusicae)	1
Swedish Music DVD (Sverigetopplistan)	1
Swiss Music DVD (Hitparade)	1
UK Music Videos (Official Charts)	1
US Top Music Video (Billboard)	1

=== Year-end video charts ===
2013 year-end video chart positions of MDNA World Tour
Charts (2013)	Position
Argentina Music DVD (CAPIF)	3
Argentina Music DVD (CAPIF) Deluxe edition	9
Belgian Music DVD (Ultratop Flanders)	11
Belgian Music DVD (Ultratop Wallonia)	4
Brazilian Music DVD (ABPD)	15
Dutch Music DVD (MegaCharts)	24
Italian Music DVD (FIMI)	3
Swedish Music DVD (Sverigetopplistan)	49
US Top Music Videos (Billboard)	29

2014 year-end video chart positions of MDNA World Tour
Charts (2014)	Position
Belgian Music DVD (Ultratop Flanders)	41
Belgian Music DVD (Ultratop Wallonia)	20
Italian Music DVD (FIMI)	19

== Certifications and sales ==
Region	Certification	Certified units/sales
Album
France	—	8,000 (Note: French sales figures as of September 20, 2013.)
Portugal (AFP)	Gold	7,500^{^}
United Kingdom	—	23,220
United States	—	4,000 (Note: U.S sales figures as of September 20, 2013.)
Video
Brazil (Pro-Música Brasil)	3× Platinum	90,000^{*}
Canada (Music Canada)	Platinum	10,000^{^}
Poland (ZPAV)	Gold	5,000^{*}
Portugal (AFP)	Platinum	8,000^{^}
United States	—	14,000 (Note: U.S sales figures for the video compilation, as of September 26, 2013: divided in 11,000 units the first week, and 3,000 the following.)
^{*} Sales figures based on certification alone.^{^} Shipments figures based on certification alone.

== Release history ==
Country	Date	Format
Australia	September 6, 2013	DVD; Blu-ray; 2CD; DVD+2CD
Germany	September 6, 2013	DVD; Blu-ray; 2CD; DVD+2CD
France	September 9, 2013	DVD; Blu-ray; 2CD; DVD+2CD
United Kingdom	September 9, 2013	DVD; Blu-ray; 2CD; DVD+2CD
United States	September 10, 2013	DVD; Blu-ray; Digital album; CD-R
Mexico	September 13, 2013	DVD; Blu-ray; DVD+2CD; Digital album
Brazil	September 25, 2013	DVD; Blu-ray; DVD+2CD; Digital album
