= Katia and Marielle Labèque =

French piano duo and sisters

The Labèque sisters, Katia (born 11 March 1950) and Marielle (born 6 March 1952), are an internationally recognised French piano duo.

== Biography ==
=== Education and first performances ===
Katia and Marielle Labèque were born in Bayonne, on the southwest coast of France, near the Spanish border in Northern Basque Country. Their father was a doctor, rugby football player, and music enthusiast who sang in the Bordeaux Opera choir. Their Italian mother, Ada Cecchi, a former student of Marguerite Long, was their first teacher; she began their lessons when they were three and five years old. After graduating in piano from the Conservatoire de Paris in 1968, the sisters began working on the piano four hands and two pianos repertoire. They recorded their first album, Les Visions de l'Amen of Olivier Messiaen, under the artistic direction of the composer, and continued to perform contemporary music, including works by Luciano Berio, Pierre Boulez, Philippe Boesmans, György Ligeti and Olivier Messiaen.

=== International career ===
This performance repertoire achieved some recognition, but celebrity arrived when their 1980 two-piano recording of Gershwin's Rhapsody in Blue sold more than half a million copies. Beyond the traditional classical repertoire, their repertoire extended to contemporary classical music, jazz, ragtime, flamenco, minimal music, baroque music on period instruments, pop music, and experimental rock.

The sisters discovered baroque music with Marco Postinghel, and commissioned two Silberman fortepianos in 1998. They played these instruments with Il Giardino Armonico conducted by Giovanni Antonini; Musica Antiqua Köln conducted by Reinhard Goebel (Johann Sebastian Bach commemoration year in 2000); the English Baroque Soloists conducted by John Eliot Gardiner; the Venice Baroque Orchestra conducted by Andrea Marcon; and with the Orchestra of the Age of Enlightenment conducted by Simon Rattle.

They performed for 33,000 people at the Waldbühne gala concert, the last concert of the 2005 season of the Berlin Philharmonic, and in May 2016 for more than 100,000 people at Schönbrunn Palace with the Vienna Philharmonic, conducted by Semyon Bychkov.

Many works have been written especially for them, such as "Linea" for two pianos and percussion by Luciano Berio; "Water Dances" for two pianos by Michael Nyman; "Battlefield" for two pianos and orchestra by Richard Dubugnon; "Nazareno" for two pianos, percussion and orchestra by Osvaldo Golijov and Gonzalo Grau; "The Hague Hacking" for two pianos and orchestra by Louis Andriessen; "Capriccio" by Philippe Boesmans; and "Concerto for two pianos and orchestra" by Philip Glass, performed in Los Angeles by the Los Angeles Philharmonic, conducted by Gustavo Dudamel.

Katia and Marielle expanded their repertoire for two pianos and percussion with works such as the first instrumental version of West Side Story, transcribed by Irwin Kostal (orchestrator of the original musical); and the version for two pianos and basque percussions of Maurice Ravel's Boléro. They premiered "Four Movements" for two pianos by Philip Glass in France, England, and Italy, where in the summer of 2011 they opened the 48th Edition of the Chamber Music Festival of Cervo, Liguria; and in Cuba. In November 2011, they premiered the project "50 Years of Minimalism" at Kings Place, London, with works by John Cage, David Chalmin, William Duckworth, Arvo Pärt, Michael Nyman, Terry Riley, Steve Reich, Howard Skempton and others.

In 2019, they collaborated with Radiohead frontman Thom Yorke for their "Minimalist Dream House" project. This partnership featured the live premiere of Yorkes’s first classical composition, "Don't Fear The Light," a piece specifically commissioned for two pianos and electronics.

In 2024 they received a Nomination in the Order of Arts and Letters from the France Government.

=== Recording career ===
Between 1970 and 1997, the sisters recorded albums for Erato (Warner Classics), Philips Records, EMI Classics, Sony Music Entertainment and Decca Records. They ceased recording for 10 years before creating their own classical music label, KML Recordings, in Italy in 2007. They also produce young bands and musicians of different musical backgrounds, such as experimental rock (B for Bang DimensionX, Dream House, Red Velvet), and traditional music (Mayte Martin, Kalakan). They produced the first album by Basque trio Kalakan and introduced them to their friend Madonna in 2011. After this meeting, the trio participated in Madonna's MDNA Tour in 2012. In June 2016 the sisters joined the Deutsche Grammophon record label for distribution of their record label, KML Recordings.

In 2005 they created their own foundation, "Fondazione Katia e Marielle Labèque", in Rome, with the aims of promoting the relationship between music and image, commissioning new works for two pianos, and supporting experimental music groups. Their first project in 2009 supported the young filmmaker Tal Rosner.

In 2012, they created their own recording studio, "Studio KML", in an ancient school in Rome as a meeting place for the musicians of their Foundation and the KML Recordings label. The first recording made here was the "Minimalist Dream House".

=== Personal lives ===
Katia's partner, David Chalmin, is a composer, producer and singer/guitarist of the band Triple Sun. Katia was in a relationship with English guitarist John McLaughlin, and she was a member of his band in the early 1980s. Marielle is married to the conductor Semyon Bychkov. The sisters still live together; they moved to London in 1987, to a palace in Florence in 1993, and since 2005 they have lived in a palace that belonged to the Borgia family of Rome.

== Discography ==
=== Recordings as a duet ===
- 1969 : Olivier Messiaen, Visions De L'Amen
- 1970 : Bartok, Sonata for 2 Pianos and Percussion
- 1972 : Rachmaninov, 24 Preludes & Suite No. 2
- 1972 : Hindemith - Martinu
- 1979 : Marius Constant : Psyche
- 1980 : Gershwin, Rhapsody In Blue / Piano Concerto In F
- 1981 : Brahms, Hungarian dances
- 1982 : Scott Joplin, Gladrags
- 1983 : Liszt, Réminiscences de Don Juan
- 1984 : Rossini, Petite messe solennelle
- 1984 : Gershwin, An American in Paris
- 1985 : Bizet, Fauré, Ravel
- 1987 : Stravinsky, Petrouchka / Concerto For 2 Pianos
- 1987 : Gershwin, I got Rhythm - Music for Two Pianos
- 1988 : Bernstein, Symphonic dances and songs from West Side Story
- 1990 : Love of Colours
- 1990 : Dvorak, Slavonic Dances Op. 46 & 72
- 1991 : Encore !
- 1993 : España !
- 1994 : Tchaikovsky, Piano fantasy : music for two pianos
- 1996 : En blanc et noir - Debussy Album, including En blanc et noir
- 2001 : Brahms - Tchaikovsky - Debussy (compilation album)
- 2003 : Piano Fantasy (compilation album - 6 CD box)
- 2006 : Maurice Ravel
- 2007 : Stravinsky / Debussy
- 2007 : Schubert / Mozart
- 2009 : Erik Satie
- 2010 : The New CD box
- 2011 : Gershwin-Bernstein, Rhapsody in Blue - West Side Story
- 2011 : Nazareno
- 2013 : Minimalist Dream House
- 2014 : Sisters
- 2016 : Invocations
- 2017 : Love Stories
- 2018 : Amoria

=== Recordings with collaborators ===
- 1981 : Gershwin's songs with Barbara Hendricks
- 1984 : Prokofiev, Peter and The Wolf and Saint Saëns, Le Carnaval des animaux with Itzhak Perlman and the Israel Philharmonic Orchestra conducted by Zubin Mehta
- 1985 : Gershwin, Rhapsody in Blue with the Cleveland Orchestra conducted by Riccardo Chailly
- 1985 : Bartók, Sonata for Two Pianos and Percussion; Concerto for Two Pianos, Percussion and Orchestra with the City of Birmingham Symphony Orchestra conducted by Simon Rattle
- 1988 : John McLaughlin, The Mediterranean Concerto Tracks: Brise de Coeur, Montana, Two Sisters, Until Such Time, Zakir
- 1989 : Poulenc, Concerto for 2 Pianos with the Boston Symphony Orchestra conducted by Seiji Ozawa
- 1989 : Mozart, Piano Concerti with the Berlin Philharmonic conducted by Semyon Bychkov
- 1990 : Mendelssohn / Bruch, Piano Concerti with the Philharmonia Orchestra
- 1997 : Carnival with Elton John, Madonna, Paul Simon, James Taylor, Sting, Tina Turner, among others, ...
- 2008 : De fuego y de Agua with Mayte Martín
- 2009 : Katia Labèque Shape Of My Heart
- 2016 : Philip Glass, Double Concerto For Two Pianos And Orchestra with the Los Angeles Philharmonic conducted by Gustavo Dudamel
- 2016 : Summer Night Concert with the Vienna Philharmonic conducted by Semyon Bychkov

== Filmography ==
- 1990 : The Loves of Emma Bardac, telefilm by Thomas Mowrey
- 2000 : The Italian Bach in Vienna, concert with Il Giardino Armonico
- 2000 : The Man Who Cried, film by Sally Potter
- 2005 : Waldbühne 2005, concert with the Berlin Philharmonic conducted by Simon Rattle
- 2005 : I'm Going to Tell You a Secret, documentary about Madonna
- 2012 : The Labeque way, documentary by Felix Cabez
- 2016 : Summer Night Concert, concert with the Vienna Philharmonic conducted by Semyon Bychkov

== Bibliography ==
- 2016: Une vie à quatre mains, Renaud Machart, Buchet/Chastel, ISBN 2283027225
