= Madonna: Tears of a Clown =

2016 international concert series by Madonna

Tears of a Clown
- Promotional concert by Madonna
- Promotional banner for the concert
- Location: North America; Oceania
- Start date: March 10, 2016
- End date: December 2, 2016
- No. of shows: 2
- Attendance: 2,000

Madonna concert chronology
- Rebel Heart Tour (2015–2016); Tears of a Clown (2016); Madame X Tour (2019–2020)

Tears of a Clown was a show by American singer Madonna, first held at the Forum Theatre in Melbourne, Australia on March 10, 2016. The singer had not included Australia during her previous five concert tours, until the Rebel Heart Tour (2015–2016), so she created the show for her Australian fans since they had waited so long for her to perform there. Madonna explained that the idea behind Tears of a Clown was to combine music and storytelling, being influenced by clowns. Tickets for the first show were made available to members of Madonna's official fan club, Icon, and were non-transferable, with the person's name printed on them.

The first show of Tears of a Clown started four hours late, with the delay being caused by Madonna rehearsing. It consisted of Madonna singing acoustic versions of her songs while dressed as a clown, interspersed with the singer telling jokes and anecdotes. Tears of a Clown received positive reviews from critics who appreciated the stripped down, confessional nature of the singer's performance and the choice of the songs and the comedy. Madonna denied reports of her being drunk on stage, calling them false and sexist. She revived the show on December 2, 2016, performing at Miami's Faena Forum as a benefit gala, to auction memorabilia and raise money for her Raising Malawi charitable foundation. Tickets were expensive, and the auctioned items included Madonna's tour dress and wedding photographs, as well as paintings that she owned.

== Background ==
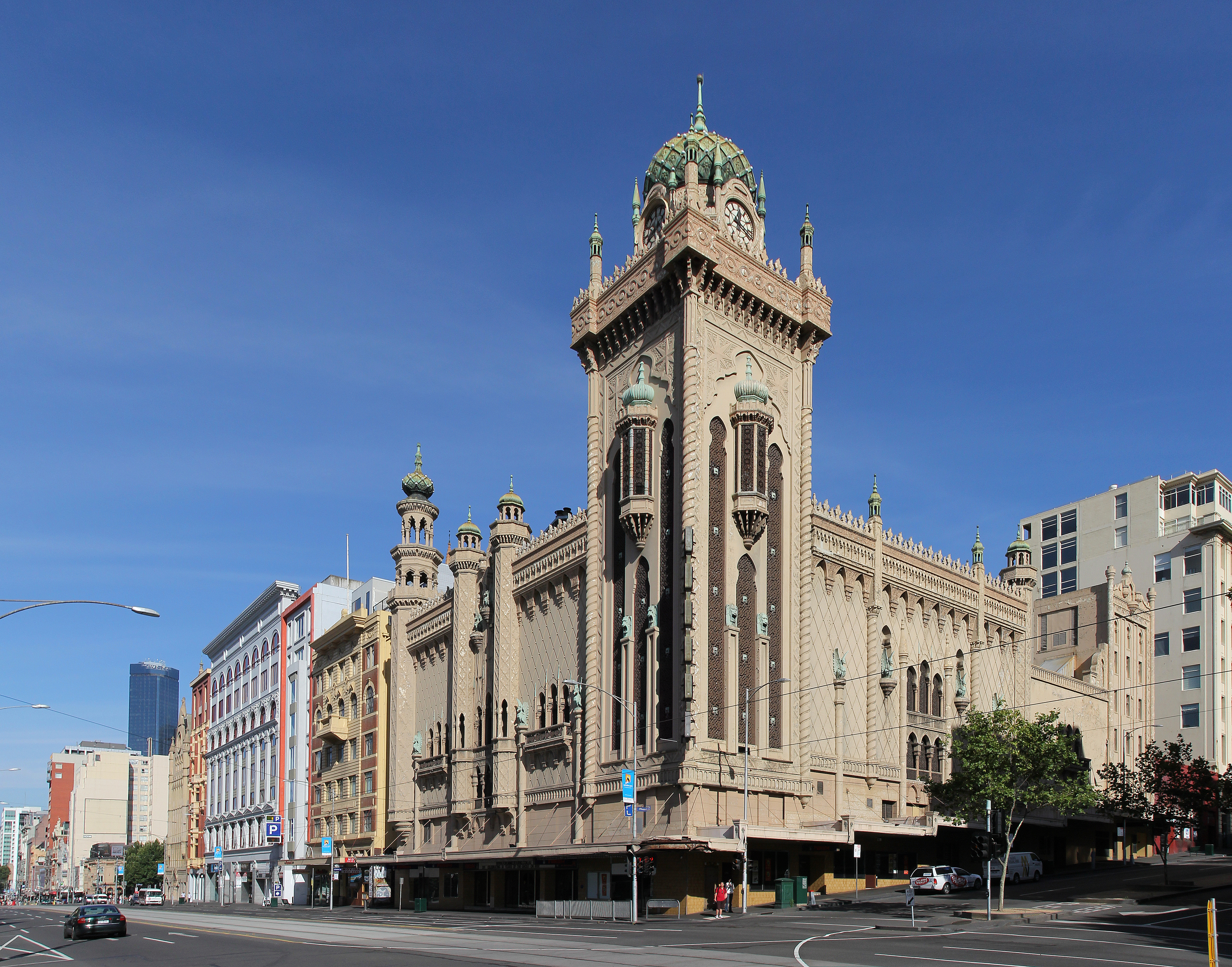
Forum Theatre, the location of the show in Melbourne

Madonna had last toured in Australia in 1993 with The Girlie Show, her fourth concert tour. The country was skipped for the next five tours until the singer released her thirteenth studio album, Rebel Heart (2015). To promote the album, Madonna announced the Rebel Heart Tour, and confirmed that she would be coming to Australia with the concert, as well as visit New Zealand for the first time. Before arriving in Australia, Madonna announced an extra show on March 10, 2016, at Melbourne's Forum Theatre. The show was billed as an intimate gig, and was described by the singer as a fusion of music, art and comedy. It was titled as Madonna: Tears of a Clown show and was created for the singer's Australian fans, who had waited for her to perform there for the last 23 years. During her promotional appearance at The Tonight Show Starring Jimmy Fallon in April 2015, Madonna confessed that she is a "kind of closet comedian" and did a skit on the show; she added, "I always do extravaganzas, they always cost a billion dollars to make ... nobody makes any money ... and sometimes I dream about simplicity." During the show, the singer explained her decision to do Tears of a Clown:

I've had this idea in my head for this show Tears of a Clown which is a combination of music and storytelling. Because at the end of the day I do think of myself as a story teller. But it's rough as f---, [sic] so bear with me and give me all the support you can. It's from the heart. I chose to debut this work in progress, this rough rehearsal, here in Australia because I feel so bad about cancelling on you guys the last time. I'm sorry. You've been so patient, you waited for so long, I feel like I owe you a present, so this is your present ... I want to make a disclaimer ... If anyone thinks they came here to see a finished final show, there's the door. This is some brand spanking new shit. I don't know if you like it raw.

Tickets were made available to members of Madonna's official fan club, Icon, and winners with details announced at Madonna.com and through concert promoter Telstra's promotional webpage. According to newspaper reports, the tickets were non-transferable, and had the person's name printed on them. However, all of them were in the general admission category at Forum Theatre, which holds a maximum capacity of 1,500. With the production design and addition of catwalk, the space allocated became smaller than that. Prior to the show The Sydney Morning Herald reported that fans started queuing up in front of the venue, while Madonna rehearsed inside, as well as at Hisense Arena. Images and songs rehearsed were leaked to fan website Drownedmadonna.com, along with Madonna's manager Guy Oseary uploading pictures on Instagram. Madonna made several references to clowns on her own Instagram account, including uploading a short video of her riding a small tricycle. The show was confirmed to be recorded and released along with the DVD for the Rebel Heart Tour.

== Synopsis ==
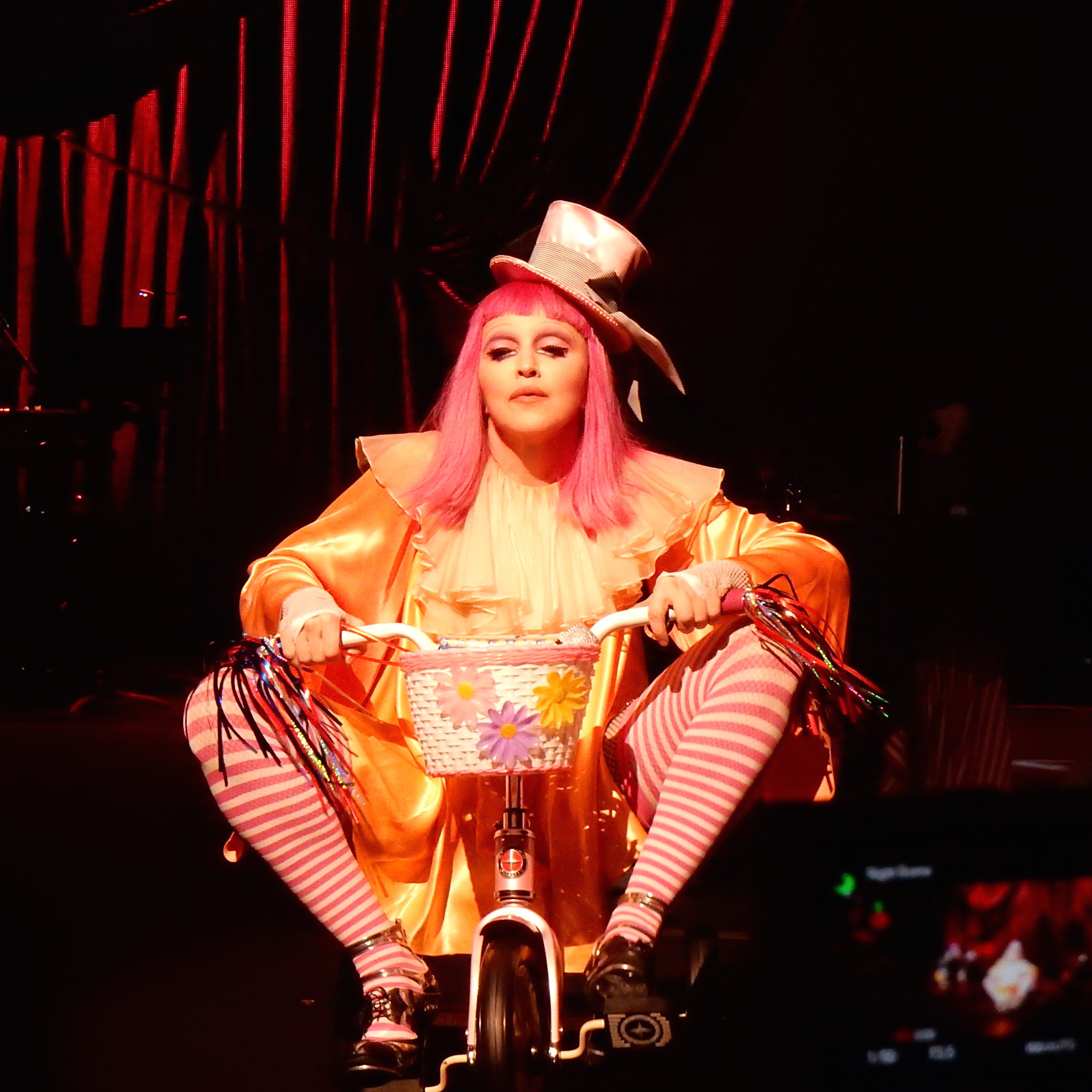
Madonna began the show by entering the stage on a tricycle and dressed as a clown.

On the day of the show, the doors at Forum Theatre were supposed to open at 8:30pm, but since Madonna rehearsed well into the night, the show started later at midnight. The show started with Madonna appearing onstage, in a clown's costume consisting of a billowing dress, pink and yellow stockings, circling the stage in a tricycle. She finally reached the front of the stage and fell down from the cycle. After conversing with the audience and throwing candy at them, Madonna started singing Stephen Sondheim's "Send in the Clowns", written originally for the 1973 musical, A Little Night Music, with images from Charlie Chaplin films displayed on the backdrop. She continued with "Drowned World/Substitute for Love" while standing in the center. Three songs followed with Madonna joining the band and sitting down with her guitar, including "X-Static Process", a cover of Elliott Smith's "Between the Bars", "Nobody's Perfect" and "Easy Ride". All the songs had displays showing circus themed videos; following this Madonna started singing the song "Intervention", while displaying an image of her son Rocco; the singer referred to her custody battle with ex-husband Guy Ritchie about Rocco.

Other acoustic versions of songs followed, including "I'm So Stupid", "Paradise (Not for Me)", "Joan of Arc" and "Don't Tell Me". Before performing the next song, "Mer Girl", Madonna explained that once she was at her father's house and she visited the place where her mother was buried; the place, overgrown with weed, became an inspiration behind the song. Then Madonna sang an acoustic version of "Borderline" followed by "Take a Bow". The encore was an acoustic version of "Holiday" featuring Madonna playing the ukulele accompanied by her band and her dancers dressed as clowns.

== Critical response ==
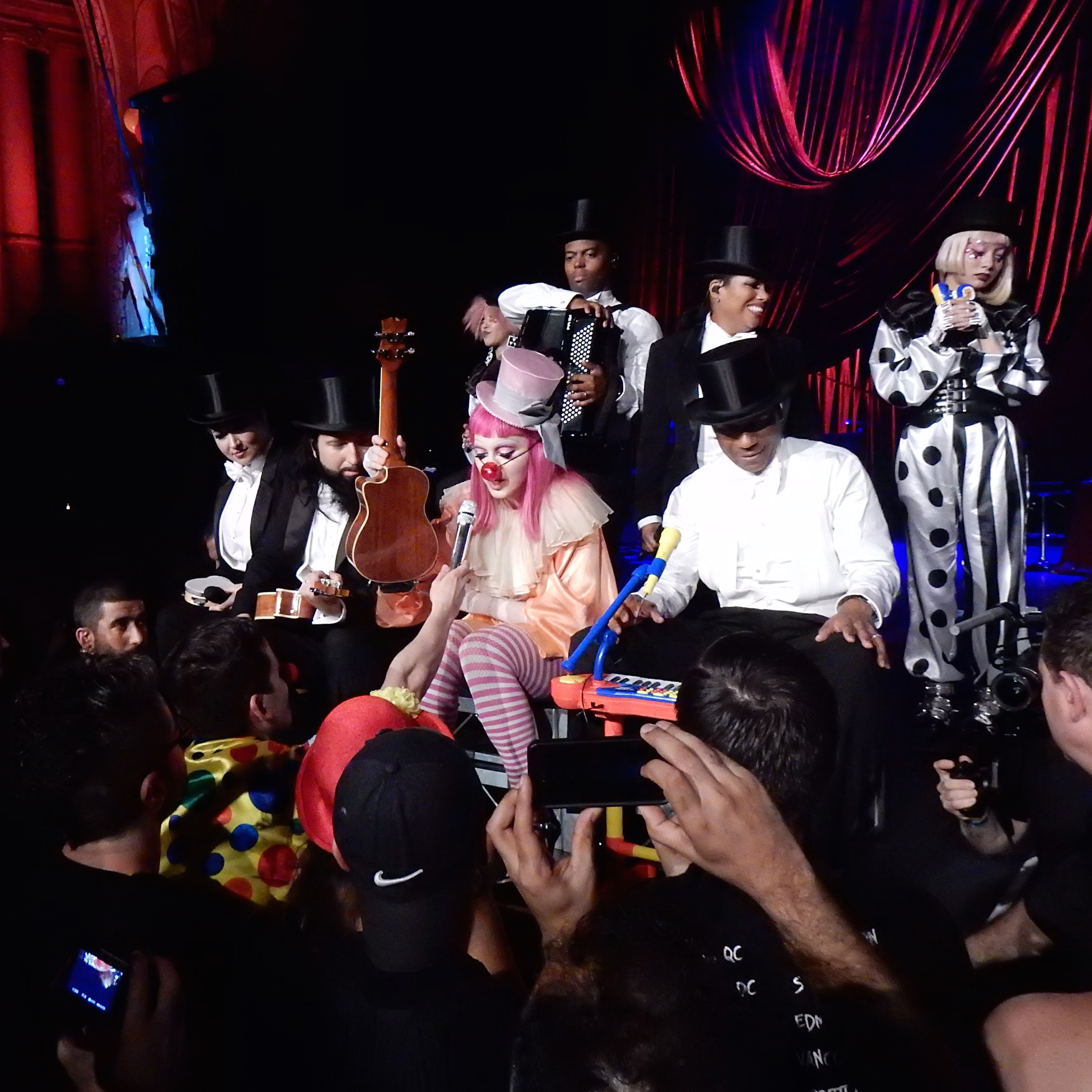
Madonna playing the ukulele while performing "Holiday", the show's final song

Cameron Adams from News.com.au wrote: "[Madonna] poured much of her sadness into her intimate two-hour Tears of a Clown show, peppering emotional renditions of her hits with cheeky jokes and banter." In another article reviewing the show, Adams noted that Tears of a Clown was "the sort of thing you never thought you'd see a superstar do". He complimented Madonna's jokes, chatting about her life in-between songs, for being "raw and vulnerable" and confessed that it was "fascinating — and difficult — to watch. We're not used to Madonna on stage doing anything less than a fully rehearsed, slick stage show." Concluding the review, Adams believed that Tears of a Clown professed Madonna's touring direction into the future. Writing for The Independent Nick Levine noticed that the singer "tested out her stand-up comedy skills with a series of risqué jokes and took the opportunity to defend her controversial fashion sense." Debbie Cuthbertson from The Sydney Morning Herald gave a positive review of the show, saying "For the queen of self-control, it was an open, at times even vulnerable insight into her persona. She seemed relaxed, drinking Cosmopolitans as she spoke at length between songs." Cuthbertson also commended the choice of Forum Theatre as a venue believing it to be "inspired, and her crew lit up the grand old dame in a way that showcased all her delicate charms in a way I can't recall any other act having ever done."

Lachlan Kanoniuk, music critic for The Guardian, noted the "bawdy" jokes and anecdotes shared onstage by Madonna. He went on to describe the show as "a weird mix of old vaudevillian-style, M15+, smut humour and bad wordplay; some jokes about clowns, sex jokes that were really quite bad but she had such great comedic delivery". Kanoniuk also compared the show to Prince's Piano & a Microphone Tour, and complimented her singing during "Between the Bars", describing it as "no costume changes, no highly synchronised dance moves, just Madonna playing an acoustic guitar and baring her soul on stage." Francis Gibb from The Times found Madonna's performance during "Intervention" as an intimate and "naked" moment for the singer due to the legal battle. Jon Lisi from PopMatters observed that unlike the Rebel Heart Tour, Madonna had "something to say" with the Tears of a Clown show. However he was confused whether Madonna was being vulnerable as a clown or it was a case of the singer "trolling us". Citing the instance of singing "Intervention" for Rocco, Lisi explained that "Of course she loves her son, but maybe this was less about her pain and more about the press' exploitation of her pain. As the show got more intimate with each song and personal anecdote, a disturbing thought crept into my mind: what if it was meant to be a joke?" Lisi concluded that the show had the ability to "represent a transitional point in [Madonna's] career", although the purpose was still unclear.

After the show ended, several media outlets reported that Madonna may have been drunk during the performance; however, Madonna blasted these reports, by responding: "Thanks for supporting me. Too bad people don't know the art of acting and playing a character. I could never do any of my shows high or drunk. And yes underlying all of this is sexism and mysongony [sic] which proves that not only do we not get equal pay but we are still treated like heretics if we step out of line and think outside the box! Sexism is alive and kicking but i am #livingforlove."

== Successive show ==
In October 2016, Madonna announced plans of collaborating with Art Basel to revive the Tears of a Clown show, at a benefit gala on December 2, 2016 at Miami Beach's Faena Forum. The location was developed by Argentine hotelier and real estate developer, Alan Faena, and the show would coincide with the opening of the Forum. The concert was held along with an accompanying art auction and dinner, to benefit Madonna's Raising Malawi foundation to support their projects like Mercy James Pediatric Surgery Hospital in Malawi, as well as art and education initiatives for impoverished children in the country. Madonna herself auctioned some of her art collection, as well as never-before-seen pictures from her marriage to actor Sean Penn, photographed by Herb Ritts. Tickets were highly priced, at general admission of $5,000 with VIP meet-and-greet packages coming at $150,000. She also auctioned the flapper dress from Rebel Heart Tour, modelled by singer Ariana Grande during the show. Penn was present in the audience and bid on several items, and at one point handcuffed Madonna and crawled through her legs for generating a higher bid.

Madonna was aided by her son David Banda, who was adopted by the singer from Malawi; Banda introduced Madonna and told the audience who bought the tickets about how "lucky" he was. The Tears of a Clown show was over an hour long, with Madonna giving her opinions on the 2016 United States Presidential Election, panning President elect Donald Trump. One of the new songs included in the set list was Britney Spears' "Toxic" (2004), which Madonna sang slowly, as images of Trump were displayed in video backdrops. The singer also spoke about the turmoils of the Native Americans and the Dakota Access Pipeline protests, and then sang "American Life" (2003). Other songs performed included "Express Yourself" (1989), "Beautiful Stranger" (1999), and "Don't Tell Me" (2000). During "Holiday", one fan got the chance to hold Madonna's microphone as she played the ukulele and sang, as well as another fan donating $10,000 in exchange for kissing the singer. In total, Madonna raised about US$7.3 million from her own items. The Associated Press reported that "[the] night was punctuated by [Madonna's] sardonic humor, corny clown jokes, controversial political statements and heartfelt moments about how much the hospital project means to her."

== Set list ==
The following set list was obtained from the concert held on March 10, 2016, at the Forum Theater in Melbourne, Australia. It does not represent all concerts for the duration of the tour.

1. "Send In the Clowns"
2. "Drowned World/Substitute for Love"
3. "X-Static Process"
4. "Between the Bars"
5. "Nobody's Perfect"
6. "Easy Ride"
7. "Intervention"
8. "I'm So Stupid"
9. "Paradise (Not for Me)"
10. "Joan of Arc"
11. "Don't Tell Me"
12. "Mer Girl"
13. "Borderline"
14. "Take a Bow"
15. "Holiday"

== Dates ==
List of concerts with date, city, country, and venue
Date (2016)	City	Country	Venue
March 10	Melbourne	Australia	Forum Theatre
December 2 (Note: This concert was a part of "Art Basel")	Miami	United States	Faena Forum
