= Secretprojectrevolution =

2013 film by Steven Klein and Madonna

secretprojectrevolution
- Directed by: Steven Klein; Madonna
- Screenplay by: Madonna
- Produced by: Madonna
- Starring: Madonna
- Narrated by: Madonna
- Cinematography: David Devlin
- Edited by: Danny Tull
- Music by: Abel Korzeniowski
- Production company: Black Dog Films
- Release date: September 24, 2013
- Running time: 17 minutes
- Country: United States
- Language: English

secretprojectrevolution is a 2013 American short film directed by Madonna and Steven Klein, dealing with artistic freedom and human rights. The film launched a global initiative, Art for Freedom, to further freedom of expression, created by Madonna, curated by Vice and distributed by BitTorrent. The goal of Art for Freedom is to promote and facilitate free expression and thereby hamper the repression of artistic expression.

== Synopsis ==
secretprojectrevolution is a 17-minute black-and-white film, featuring Madonna's off-camera commentary throughout, which consists of a narrative recorded exclusively for the project as well as excerpts from her onstage speeches during the MDNA Tour.

It opens with a scene depicting Madonna locked in a prison cell, holding the bars. This is projected against a voice-over consisting of excerpts from her onstage speech at the Olympia in Paris, during the MDNA Tour in July 2012. The speech reflected on the global economic situation at the time, explaining that fear is the root of intolerance. The film then shows a pantomime, with the troupe of dancers sitting and standing still in a room, while Madonna enters holding a gun, which represents branding, and starts shooting them. This section ends with the words "All you need for a movie is a gun and a girl", a quote from Jean-Luc Godard, displayed across the screen.

The following scene shows Madonna being dragged by police officers to a cell, where she is thrown on the floor. By that point, her narrative starts, explaining the circumstances that prompted her to undertake the project. It continues for several minutes as the footage of Madonna in her cell alternates with scenes depicting a man being tortured by others, and a dancer performing routines. Madonna is then shown restrained on a bed, with a dancer teasing her and simulating torture. The following scene depicts an imprisoned man, who had been a victim of physical torture, with blood on his face and chest.

In the following segment, dancers start performing routines and adapting expressive poses as downtempo piano music plays and Madonna continues her narrative. An almost nude man dances in front of guards, and Madonna's a cappella performance of "My Country, 'Tis of Thee" starts playing, followed by excerpts from her Saint Petersburg speech. The footage of Madonna killing the dancers is played backwards as they are brought back to life. Madonna is again shown being dragged by police officers who drop her on the floor and start looking down on her. A quote follows this: "Freedom is what you do with what's been done to you," by Jean-Paul Sartre.

The film ends with a message: "This film is dedicated to those who have been persecuted, are being persecuted, or may be persecuted. For the color of their skin. Their religious beliefs. Their artistic expression. Their gender. Or their sexual preferences. Anyone whose human rights have been violated."

== Production ==
=== Background ===
In late 2012, Madonna and Steven Klein were due to work together on a photo shoot for the promotional campaign of shoes and lingerie she had designed as part of her Truth or Dare collection. However, her products were met with unfavorable reception from the distributing company as being too provocative, which led to the cancellation of the whole project. Instead, Madonna decided to use the set for filming the project with Klein and her dancers, using her own-designed lingerie. The work began in Buenos Aires, Argentina, in mid-December 2012, during Madonna's break between performances in the country. Over the following weeks, the singer started writing the narration, and more footage was produced.

The film was her artistic response to a series of social and political events which took place around the world while she was performing the MDNA Tour in the second half of 2012. These events included, among others, the threat of Israel striking Iran, the imprisonment of Yulia Tymoshenko in Ukraine and Pussy Riot in Russia, gay rights violations, presidential election in the United States and the attempted assassination of Malala Yousafzai. One of the scenes was inspired by the film The Night Porter, while the scene inspired another in the film noir Caged, in which Eleanor Parker is jailed. Madonna has described secretprojectrevolution as one of the most important things she has ever done.

=== Development ===
On December 14, 2012, a picture taken on the set of the project surfaced online, sparking rumors that Madonna was allegedly working on her next music video, which many fans thought would be "Gang Bang." On December 19, Steven Klein first referred to the film as "#secretproject" on Twitter, which would serve as its official name. Later that month, he contacted the likes of Rihanna, Lady Gaga, Cher, Dita Von Teese, and Naomi Campbell on Twitter, inviting them to participate in the project. A picture captioned "From Madonna to Rihanna 2 of 3" would emerge at the beginning of 2013, followed by a photograph of Naomi Campbell and Kate Moss, with a caption associating them with the project. More pictures from the set surfaced online, and Madonna began posting stills from the film and related pictures on Instagram in March 2013, attributed to a hashtag #secretproject, which was later modified to #secretprojectrevolution.

On March 20, Klein published the first trailer of the film. In July, rumors began circulating that the project was the launch of a new clothing line, designed by Madonna's then-partner Brahim Zaibat.

== Release ==
Initially announced for a May 12, 2013 release, the film was eventually premiered on September 23, in a series of eighteen outdoor screenings across five cities in four countries: New York, Los Angeles, Toronto, Berlin and London. The following day, secretprojectrevolution was released in the same form in Chicago, San Francisco, Rome, Paris, and Tel Aviv, the latter added as the final location at the last minute. All locations had been revealed shortly before the events via Madonna's social media profiles. On September 24, the full film was uploaded to YouTube and released via a new BitTorrent-based feature called Bundle, which included unlocked trailers and stills, as well as three videos and a written message from Madonna, which were initially locked but could be unlock by submitting a valid email address. BitTorrent claims that BitTorrent Bundle is still an alpha-stage project. It is a proprietary format for distributing locked content along with a virtual storefront that presents consumers with ways that the artist has chosen to enable content unlocking, which can vary.

During a screening in New York's Gagosian Gallery, Madonna made a personal appearance at the event, preceding the projection with a speech and following it with a live performance of Elliott Smith's "Between the Bars", accompanied by her son Rocco Ritchie as a dancer. Meanwhile, a 40-minute interview was uploaded to YouTube, conducted in London by Vice's Eddy Moretti, in which Madonna explains the circumstances that prompted her to realize the whole project.

== Reception and aftermath ==
Despite Madonna's limited personal appearances to promote the project as well as its non-commercial nature, secretprojectrevolution was met with a respectable amount of media coverage and public interest. However, the reviews it received were mixed. An estimated ten thousand people watched the film across all screenings. In less than three weeks, the Bundle has been downloaded over 1.2m times, and as of October 2013, tens of works were being submitted every day on the Art for Freedom website.

British singer-songwriter and activist Kate Nash announced working on her own "secret project" in August 2013, inviting fans to collaborate. She would later adapt Madonna's approach for her UK Street Teams project in October 2013, organizing group meet-ups at previously announced locations. The music video for Lady Gaga's duet with R. Kelly, "Do What U Want," was reported to be released on BitTorrent in December 2013, in collaboration with Vice. Although secretprojectrevolution never officially premiered in Poland, the Official Madonna Fanclub in Poland organized a screening of the film in Cracow in December 2013.

Simultaneously with the film's release, the Art for Freedom program was initiated, enabling artists to upload their works that express their personal definitions of freedom and revolution on the artforfreedom.com website. A one-year grants program was launched in October to support individuals and organizations working to advance social justice. Every month, Madonna and a guest curator select a winning submission and award $10,000 to a nonprofit organization or project of the winning artist's choice. The first guest curator was Anthony Kiedis of the Red Hot Chili Peppers.

On October 8, 2013, Madonna hosted first ever live art curation on Twitter, followed by another curation on Tumblr on November 13, 2013. Meanwhile, screenings of secretprojectrevolution took place in Jericho and Rio de Janeiro, on October 11 and 20, respectively. In November, an Art for Freedom-themed design overlay pack was released through a graphic design application Studio. In early January 2014, Katy Perry became a guest curator of Art for Freedom, followed by Miley Cyrus in early April. A live art curation took place on BuzzFeed on April 15, 2014.

== Screening dates ==
Date	City	Locations
23 September 2013	New York (United States)	West 31st Street (10pm); Museum of Modern Art, West 53rd Street (11pm)
23 September 2013	Toronto (Canada)	Distillery District, 9 Trinity Street (9pm); Art Gallery of Ontario, 317 Dundas Street West (10pm); Bata Shoe Museum, 327 Bloor Street West (10.45pm); The Royal Conservatory of Music, 273 Bloor Street West (11.30pm)
23 September 2013	Los Angeles (United States)	Hillhurst Avenue (9pm); Petersen Automotive Museum, 6060 Wilshire Boulevard (10pm); The Factory, 652 N La Peer Drive (11pm); Santa Monica Civic Auditorium, 1855 Main Street (12am)
23 September 2013	Berlin (Germany)	Oranienburger Straße (9pm); Galeria Kaufhof, Alexanderplatz (9.50pm); Friedrichstraße (10.40pm); Stralauer Platz (11.30pm)
23 September 2013	London (England)	Exhibition Road, Kensington (9pm); Gerrard Place, Chinatown (10pm); Tate Modern, Holland Street (11pm); Shoreditch High Street railway station (12am)
24 September 2013	Chicago (United States)	East Illinois Street (9pm); South Clark Street (10pm); East Chestnut Street (11pm); North Wells Street (12am); North Rush Street (1am)
24 September 2013	San Francisco (United States)	UC Hastings College of the Law, 200 McAllister Street (9pm); Palace of Fine Arts, 3301 Lyon Street (10pm); De Young Museum, 50 Hagiwara Tea Garden Drive (11.30pm); Social Security Administration, 90 7th Street (12.30am)
24 September 2013	Tel Aviv (Israel)	Habima Theatre (10pm)
24 September 2013	Rome (Italy)	Ara Pacis Museum, Piazza Augusto Imperatore (10pm); Piazza della Rotonda (10.50pm); Piazza Venezia (11.40pm); Termini, Via Marsala (12.30am)
24 September 2013	Paris (France)	Trocadéro, Place du Trocadéro (10pm); Palais de Tokyo, Avenue du Président-Wilson (10.50pm); Igor Stravinsky, Rue Saint-Merri (11.40pm); Panthéon, Place du Panthéon (12.30am)
October 11, 2013	Jericho (Palestine)	Spanish Gardens (10pm)
October 20, 2013	Rio de Janeiro (Brazil)	Praça do Conhecimento, Complexo do Alemão (8pm)
November 16, 2013	Vigo (Spain)	MARCO Museo de Arte Contemporáneo de Vigo (8.30pm)
