= Kalakan (band) =

Basque musical ensemble

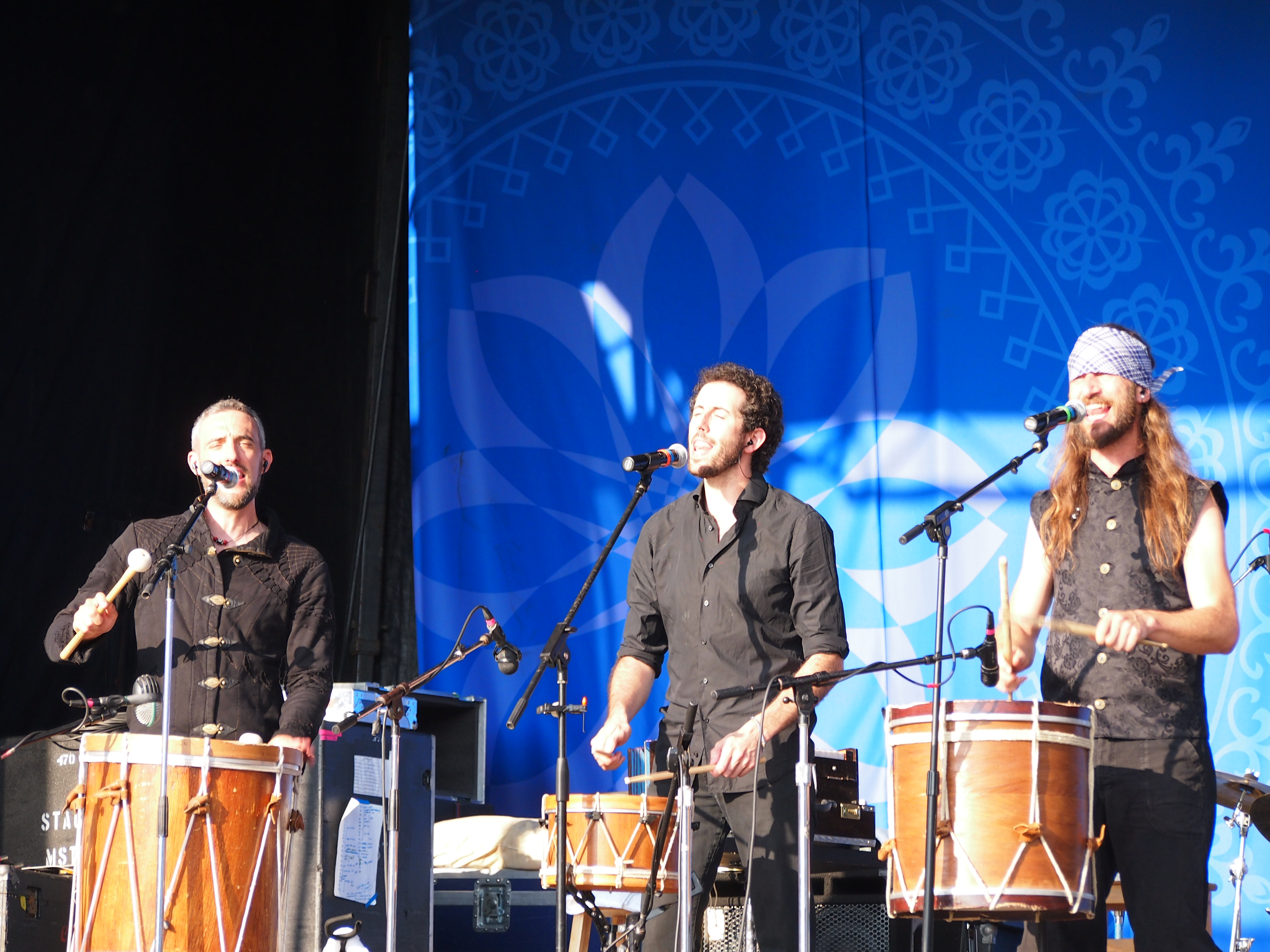

Background information
- Origin: Basque Country (greater region)
- Genres: Folk
- Years active: 2009–present
- Labels: Saroia Records
- Members: Jamixel Bereau; Xan Errotabehere; Bixente Etchegaray
- Website: kalakan.eus

Kalakan is a music band from the northern Basque Country composed of Jamixel Bereau and Xan Errotabehere. It is characterized by minimalist arrangements (vocals, traditional Basque instruments and percussions) of Basque traditional songs. After having collaborated and toured Europe with pianists Katia and Marielle Labèque, the trio become more widely known when they collaborated with Madonna during The MDNA Tour.

== Career ==
=== Formation: 2009–2010 ===
Kalakan was created in 2009 by Paxkal Indo, Thierry Biscary and Jamixel Bereau from their txalaparta duo. After touring Europe with pianists Katia and Marielle Labèque, performing an arrangement for two pianos and Basque percussion of Maurice Ravel's Boléro, they invited percussionist Frédéric Chambon to join them to form a trio. Before going on their first artist in residence program to prepare their first record, Chambon was replaced by singer and percussionist Jamixel Bereau.

Their album Kalakan was recorded at Laguna Records in Biarritz and mixed at studio K in Paris by producer David Chalmin during autumn 2010. Katia and Marielle Labèque recorded "Kantuz" with a piano arrangement made by Joël Merah, and Basque choir Anaiki from Paris contributed backing vocals to "De Treville-n azken hitzak". This first album was co-produced by Basque record label ZTK Diskak, representing Paxkal Indo, and Italian record label KML Recordings, representing Katia and Marielle Labèque. 2000 discs were duplicated, with a portion of them being distributed by Abeille musique (France) and Elkar (Basque country).

=== Increasing fame: 2011–2012 ===
After some promotional concerts in support of their first album, Paxkal Indo was replaced by singer and percussionist Xan Errotabehere. After this, Kalakan reached greater successes. The first thirty concerts given in the Basque country and in Europe were successful. Kalakan won the 2011 edition of the Transhumances musicales festival in Laàs. Most Kalakan albums were sold after the shows and they sold out completely before autumn 2011.

During the summer of the same year, Kalakan were introduced to Madonna by Katia and Marielle Labèque during her holidays at their house on the coast of the Northern Basque Country. For her 53rd birthday on August 16, 2011, they performed their version of Ravel's Boléro and some of their songs. Madonna liked Kalakan and asked the trio members to accompany her on tour in 2012. After a workshop in New York City in February 2012, participation of Kalakan in the MDNA Tour was confirmed.

During the show rehearsals from March to May, Kalakan proposed different arrangements of Madonna's hits and some traditional Basque songs. The majority of the musical propositions were approved by musical director Kevin Antunes and Madonna. She decided to sing a verse of "Sagarra Jo!" in Basque. The MDNA Tour visited Middle East, Europe, North America, South America and the artists did more than 80 shows in seven months.

== Music and influences ==
In Euskara, "Kalakan" means "chatting". The band members love their mother tongue and its musicality. They arrange Basque traditional songs to give them a contemporary sound, using for example the verse-chorus structure used by pop and rock and roll musicians.

Kalakan plays Basque percussion instruments (pandereta, txalaparta, tobera, ttun-ttun, atabal), body percussions and handcrafted large drums. Giving rhythm to old melodies or interpreting new songs a capella, they mark a break with the Basque song that has developed in the Basque country since the 1970s.

== Discography ==
- 2010: Kalakan
- 2015: Elementuak
- 2018: Elementuak II

Also appears on:

- 2011: Baionatik Bilbora (compilation)
- 2013: MDNA world tour (live album)
- 2013: Silex (collaboration with OrekaTx)

== Filmography ==
- 2011: Elementuak. Video clip by Baxter & Rojos productions.

Also appears on:

- 2012: The Labeque way. Documentary by Felix Cabez
- 2013: Katia et Marielle Labeque, rock et baroque. Documentary by Fabrice Ferrari and Constance Lagarde
- 2013: MDNA world tour (live DVD)
- 2015: Faire la parole. Eugène Green documentary
