= Danny Tull =

English director and film editor

- Born: Danny B. Tull; 27 February 1977 (age 49); Bournemouth, England
- Education: Rose Bruford College (1997)
- Occupations: Director, film editor

Danny B. Tull (born 27 February 1977) is an English director and film editor.

== Early life ==
Danny Tull was born in Bournemouth, England, and attained a degree in music technology at Rose Bruford College, London, which he attended from 1995 to 1997.

== Career ==
He started editing video at Metropolis Video in London's Neal's Yard in 1998 working on music videos, documentaries, television, commercial and non-commercial, with directors such as Jonas Akerlund, Chris Cunningham, Johan Renck and editing music videos for artists such as Madonna, Jamiroquai, Manic Street Preachers, Justin Timberlake and Moby.

Tull has worked with photographer/directors such as Steven Klein, Tom Munro, Mert and Marcus, Terry Richardson and Clive Arrowsmith. In 2012 he worked with Tom Munro to edit a short film with Rihanna and Elle magazine called "Havana"; he edited and co-wrote the soundtrack for this.

In 2005 he edited the feature film Ragtale and subsequently continued to edit feature length presentations.

He has worked with pop singer Madonna for a number of years editing many of her music videos ("4 Minutes", "Give It 2 Me", "Celebration", "Give Me All Your Luvin'", "Girl Gone Wild", "Living for Love", "Ghosttown", "Bitch I'm Madonna") as well as working on her concert videos: The Confessions Tour (Editor), Sticky and Sweet Tour (Associate director/editor) and MDNA World Tour (Director/editor). He also worked on many of the back screen projections for the tours. The MDNA Tour was dubbed as the highest-grossing tour of 2012 by Billboard, and became the tenth highest-grossing tour of all time.

For Madonna, he also edited the documentary I Am Because We Are (2008), the feature film W.E. (2011; directed by Madonna) and in 2013, he edited her 17-minute film secretprojectrevolution.

On 26 July 2012, Tull directed and edited Madonna Live at Paris Olympia show which was broadcast live on YouTube.

In the summer of 2014, Tull worked with the agency McCann London and director Cristiana Miranda to edit the L'Oréal Elnett Satin hairspray commercial with Cheryl Cole. Produced by Passion Raw and Pos- production by Framestore.

On his latest job, Danny flew to Paris for the last two shows of ON THE RUN tour (Beyoncé and Jay-Z) to help vision mix the live show and then to join the team of editors that cut the 2:20 hrs HBO special in only five days. The first of its kind directed by Jonas Akerlund and editing headed up by Christian Larson. The show was shot at Stade De France, with over 30 cameras per night.

== Awards and nominations ==
In 2005 he edited the film Ragtale, which won Best Editor in the Jackson Hole film festival and in 2007 he worked on Intervention, which won the best feature in San Diego.

In 2010 the I Am Because We Are documentary won a "VH1 Do Something award".

His commercials work in 2012 on Perrier's "The Drop" with Johan Renck earned a nomination for a Cannes Lion award. He also worked on an earlier Gucci commercial in 2009, "Flora by Gucci", with Chris Cuningham which was awarded a Golden Lion at Cannes.

In 2009, his work as an editor on Lady Gaga's "Paparazzi" music video with Jonas Akerlund was nominated for Best Video at the MTV Video Music Awards and The Confessions Tour in 2008 won a Grammy Award for Best Long Form Music Video.
