= List of accolades received by KPop Demon Hunters =

KPop Demon Hunters accolades
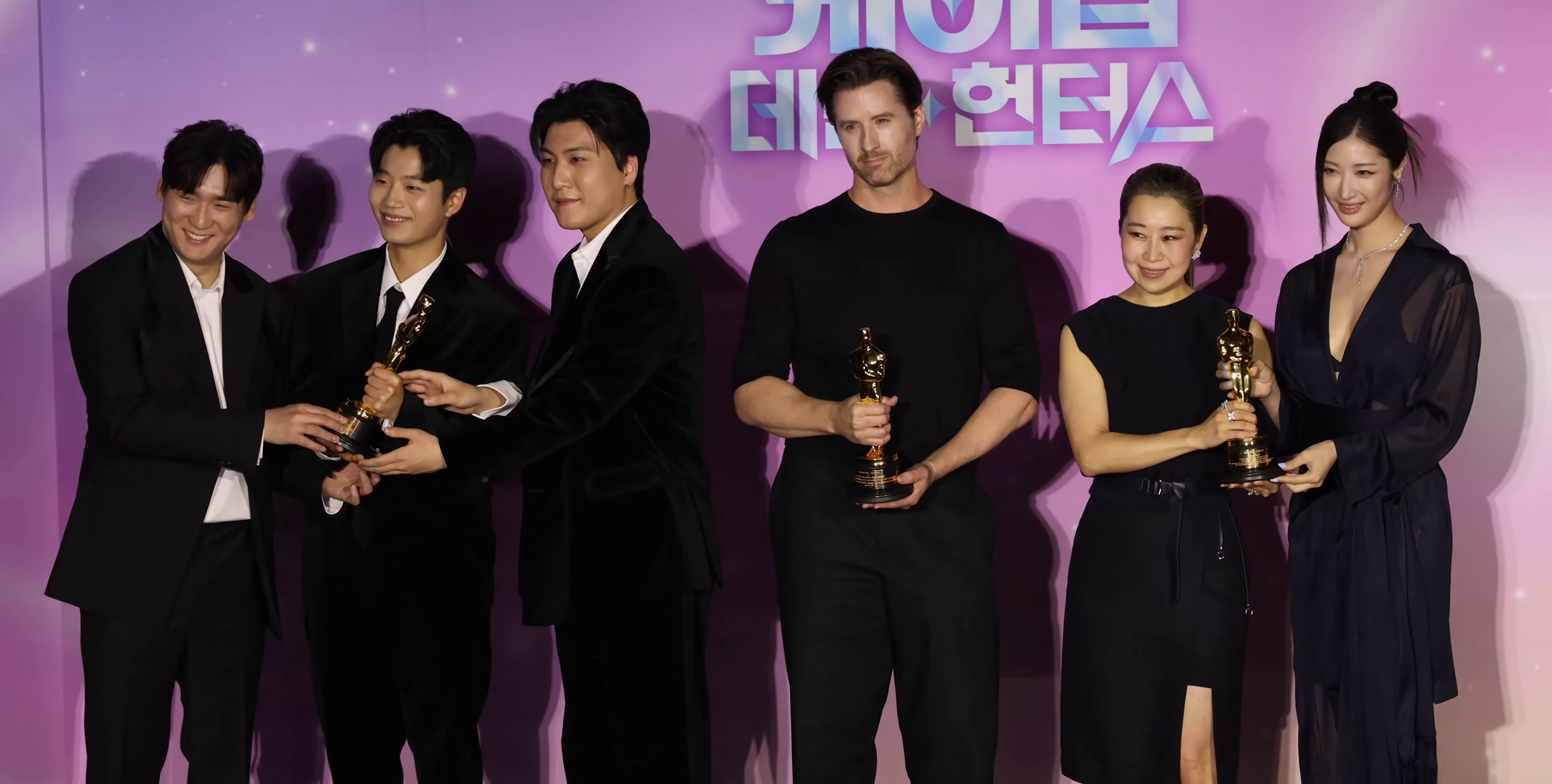
- Ido, Chris Appelhans, Maggie Kang, and Ejae holding their Academy Awards for the film
Awards and nominations
Award	Wins	Nominations
AACTA Awards	0	1
Academy Awards	2	2
Advanced Imaging Society Lumiere Awards	2	2
African-American Film Critics Association	1	1
Alliance of Women Film Journalists	2	2
American Cinema Editors	1	1
American Cinematheque	1	1
American Music Awards	4	4
Annie Awards	10	10
Art Directors Guild Awards	1	1
ASCAP Pop Music Awards	1	1
Asia Artist Awards	2	2
Associated Press	1	1
Astra Creative Arts Awards	0	1
Astra Film Awards	3	3
Atlanta Film Critics Circle	2	2
Austin Film Critics Association	2	3
BFE Cut Above Awards	1	1
Billboard Women in Music	1	1
Black Film Critics Circle	1	1
Boston Online Film Critics Association	1	1
Brit Awards	0	2
Capri Hollywood International Film Festival	2	2
Celebration of Asian Pacific Cinema and Television	1	1
Chicago Film Critics Association	1	1
Chicago Indie Critics	1	2
Choreo Awards	1	1
Cinema Audio Society Awards	1	1
Columbus Film Critics Association	1	1
Critics Association Of Central Florida	2	2
Critics' Choice Movie Awards	2	2
Dallas–Fort Worth Film Critics Association	1	1
Denver Film Critics Society	2	3
DiscussingFilm's Global Film Critics Awards	2	2
Dorian Award	1	2
Florida Film Critics Circle	0	1
Georgia Film Critics Association	2	2
Gold Derby Film Awards	2	2
Golden Globe Awards	2	3
Golden Reel Awards	0	2
Golden Tomato Awards	1	2
Golden Trailer Awards	1	2
Grammy Awards	1	5
Greater Western New York Film Critics Association	1	1
Hanteo Music Awards	0	8
Hawaii Film Critics Society	1	1
Hollywood Music in Media Awards	1	3
Houston Film Critics Society	2	2
Hugo Awards	0	1
Humanitas Prize	0	1
ICG Publicists Awards	0	1
iHeartRadio Music Awards	3	5
Indiana Film Journalists Association	1	1
IndieWire Honors	1	1
International Cinephile Society	0	1
Japan Gold Disc Award	2	2
KALH Honors	1	1
Kansas City Film Critics Circle	1	1
Kidscreen Awards	1	1
Korea First Brand Awards	1	1
Korea Grand Music Awards	0	2
Korean Association of Film Critics Awards	1	1
K-World Dream Awards	1	2
Las Vegas Film Critics Society	1	3
Latino Entertainment Journalists Association	2	2
London Film Critics Circle Awards	1	1
Los 40 Music Awards	1	1
Los Angeles Film Critics Association	1	1
MAMA Awards	2	5
Marie Claire Asia Star Awards	1	1
Melon Music Awards	1	2
Michigan Movie Critics Guild	1	1
Minnesota Film Critics Association	1	2
MTV Video Music Awards	0	2
Music Awards Japan	1	4
Music City Film Critics Association	0	3
NAACP Image Award	0	1
Nebula Award	0	1
New Jersey Film Critics Circle	2	2
New Mexico Film Critics Association Awards	2	2
New York Film Critics Circle	1	1
New York Film Critics Online	0	2
NHMC's annual Impact Awards	1	1
Nickelodeon Kids' Choice Awards	3	5
North Carolina Film Critics Association	3	6
North Dakota Film Society	1	2
North Texas Film Critics Association	1	1
NRJ Music Awards	1	1
Oklahoma Film Critics Circle	1	1
Online Association of Female Film Critics	1	1
The Online Film & Television Association	3	3
Online Film Critics Society	1	1
Philadelphia Film Critics Circle	1	1
Phoenix Critics Circle	1	1
Pittsburgh Film Critics Association	3	3
Portland Critics Association	0	1
Producers Guild of America Awards	1	1
Puerto Rico Critics Association	2	2
RTHK International Pop Poll Awards	1	1
San Diego Film Critics Society	1	2
San Francisco Bay Area Film Critics Circle	1	1
Santa Barbara International Film Festival	1	1
Satellite Awards	0	2
Saturn Awards	0	1
Seattle Film Critics Society	1	1
SEC Awards	1	2
Society of Composers & Lyricists Awards	1	1
Songwriters of North America	1	1
Southeastern Film Critics Awards	1	1
St. Louis Film Critics Association	2	3
TikTok Korea Awards	1	1
Time Magazine	1	1
Toronto Film Critics Association	1	1
Unforgettable Awards	1	1
Utah Film Critics Association	1	1
Variety Hitmakers Awards	1	1
Visual Effects Society	3	5
Washington D.C. Area Film Critics Association	2	2
Women Film Critics Circle	1	1
World Animation Summit	1	1
World Soundtrack Awards	1	2

Totals (Note: Certain award groups do not simply award one winner. They acknowledge several different recipients, have runners-up, and have third place. Since this is a specific recognition and is different from losing an award, runner-up mentions are considered wins in this award tally. For simplification and to avoid errors, each award in this list has been presumed to have had a prior nomination.)
- Wins: 151
- Nominations: 223

KPop Demon Hunters is a 2025 American animated musical urban fantasy film directed by Maggie Kang and Chris Appelhans from a screenplay they co-wrote with Danya Jimenez and Hannah McMechan. Produced by Sony Pictures Animation for Netflix, the film features the voices of Arden Cho, Ahn Hyo-seop, May Hong, Ji-young Yoo, Yunjin Kim, Daniel Dae Kim, Ken Jeong, and Lee Byung-hun. The film follows a K-pop girl group, Huntrix, who lead double lives as demon hunters; they face off against a rival boy band, the Saja Boys, whose members are secretly demons.

KPop Demon Hunters began streaming on Netflix on June 20, 2025, while a sing-along version had limited theatrical releases on August 23–24 and October 31–November 2. The film received praise from critics for its animation, visual style, voice acting, story, and music. On the review aggregator website Rotten Tomatoes, 91% of 105 critics' reviews are positive. The website's consensus reads: "Animated with infectious energy and vibrant colors, KPop Demon Hunters is jaunty family entertainment with a terrific soundtrack to boot." Metacritic, which uses a weighted average, assigned the film a score of 77 out of 100, based on 10 critics, indicating "generally favorable" reviews.

KPop Demon Hunters garnered various awards, nominations, and accolades. It won Best Animated Feature at the 31st Critics' Choice Awards, the 83rd Golden Globe Awards, and the 98th Academy Awards, along with being featured in Time as its 2025 Breakthrough of the Year. The film received ten nominations at the 53rd Annie Awards, including for Best Feature, and won in all of its categories. The song "Golden", from the soundtrack, won Best Original Song at the Critics' Choice Awards, Golden Globes, and Academy Awards, won Best Song Written for Visual Media at the 68th Grammy Awards, and won Best OST at the 2025 Melon Music Awards and 2025 MAMA Awards.

== Accolades ==
Award	Date of ceremony	Category	Recipient(s)	Result	Ref.
K-World Dream Awards	August 21, 2025	Best OST	"Golden" – Ejae, Audrey Nuna, Rei Ami	Won	
K-World Dream Awards	August 21, 2025	Best OST	"Soda Pop" – Andrew Choi, Neckwav, Danny Chung, Kevin Woo, and SamUIL Lee	Nominated	
MTV Video Music Awards	September 7, 2025	Song of Summer	"Golden" – Ejae, Audrey Nuna, Rei Ami	Nominated	
Marie Claire Asia Star Awards	September 20, 2025	Director of the Year	Maggie Kang	Won	
TikTok Korea Awards	October 25, 2025	Entertainment of the Year Award	Maggie Kang	Won	
NRJ Music Awards	November 1, 2025	Social Hit	"Golden" (David Guetta Remix)	Won	
Korean Association of Film Critics Awards	November 6, 2025	FIPRESCI Award (Foreign)	Maggie Kang and Chris Appelhans	Won	
Los 40 Music Awards	November 7, 2025	Best International New Artist	Huntrix	Won	
Celebration of Asian Pacific Cinema and Television	November 14, 2025	Animation Award	Maggie Kang	Won	
Korea Grand Music Awards	November 14–15, 2025	Best Virtual Artist	"Golden" – Huntrix	Nominated	
Korea Grand Music Awards	November 14–15, 2025	Best Virtual Artist	"Soda Pop" – Saja Boys	Nominated	
World Animation Summit	November 17, 2025	Movie of the Year Award	Maggie Kang and Chris Appelhans	Honored	
Hollywood Music in Media Awards	November 19, 2025	Original Song – Animated Film	"Golden" – Ejae, Mark Sonnenblick, Joong Gyu Kwak, Yu Han Lee, Hee Dong Nam, Jeong Hoon Seo, and Park Hong Jun	Won	
Hollywood Music in Media Awards	November 19, 2025	Song – Onscreen Performance (Film)	"Golden" – Ejae, Audrey Nuna, and Rei Ami	Nominated	
Hollywood Music in Media Awards	November 19, 2025	Soundtrack Album	KPop Demon Hunters	Nominated	
MAMA Awards	November 28–29, 2025	Best OST	"Golden" – Ejae, Audrey Nuna, Rei Ami	Won	
MAMA Awards	November 28–29, 2025	Best OST	"Soda Pop" – Andrew Choi, Neckwav, Danny Chung, Kevin Woo, and SamUIL Lee	Nominated	
MAMA Awards	November 28–29, 2025	Music Visionary of the Year	KPop Demon Hunters	Won	
MAMA Awards	November 28–29, 2025	Song of the Year	"Golden" – Ejae, Mark Sonnenblick, Joong Gyu Kwak, Yu Han Lee, Hee Dong Nam, Jeong Hoon Seo, and Teddy Park	Nominated	
MAMA Awards	November 28–29, 2025	Song of the Year	"Soda Pop" – Vince, Kush, Danny Chung, 24, Dominsuk	Nominated	
Atlanta Film Critics Circle	December 3, 2025	Best Animated Film	KPop Demon Hunters	Won	
Atlanta Film Critics Circle	December 3, 2025	Best Voice Performance	Arden Cho	Won	
IndieWire Honors	December 4, 2025	Spark Award	Chris Appelhans, Maggie Kang, and Ejae	Honored	
Variety Hitmakers Awards	December 6, 2025	Variety's KPop Demon Hitmakers of the Year	Ejae, Audrey Nuna, and Rei Ami	Honored	
Asia Artist Awards	December 6, 2025	Best OST	"Golden" – Ejae, Audrey Nuna, Rei Ami	Won	
Asia Artist Awards	December 6, 2025	Best Voice Performance	Arden Cho	Won	
KALH Honors	December 7, 2025	Pioneer Award	Maggie Kang	Honored	
Toronto Film Critics Association	December 7, 2025	Best Animated Feature	KPop Demon Hunters	Runner-up	
Washington D.C. Area Film Critics Association	December 7, 2025	Best Animated Film	KPop Demon Hunters	Won	
Washington D.C. Area Film Critics Association	December 7, 2025	Best Voice Performance	Arden Cho	Won	
Michigan Movie Critics Guild	December 8, 2025	Best Animated Film	KPop Demon Hunters	Won	
Associated Press	December 11, 2025	Breakthrough Entertainers of the Year	Arden Cho	Won	
Astra Creative Arts Awards	December 11, 2025	Best Sound	Michael Babcock, Tony Lamberti, Jeff Sawyer, Katie Halliday, Chris Diebold, and Trevor Gates	Nominated	
Chicago Film Critics Association	December 11, 2025	Best Animated Feature	KPop Demon Hunters	Won	
Phoenix Critics Circle	December 11, 2025	Best Animation Film	KPop Demon Hunters	Won	
San Francisco Bay Area Film Critics Circle	December 14, 2025	Best Animated Feature	KPop Demon Hunters	Won	
St. Louis Film Critics Association	December 14, 2025	Best Animated Film	KPop Demon Hunters	Runner-up	
St. Louis Film Critics Association	December 14, 2025	Best Music Soundtrack	KPop Demon Hunters	Nominated	
St. Louis Film Critics Association	December 14, 2025	Best Vocal Performance	Arden Cho	Runner-up	
Indiana Film Journalists Association	December 15, 2025	Best Animated Film	KPop Demon Hunters	Won	
New York Film Critics Online	December 15, 2025	Best Use of Music	KPop Demon Hunters	Nominated	
New York Film Critics Online	December 15, 2025	Best Animation	KPop Demon Hunters	Nominated	
San Diego Film Critics Society	December 15, 2025	Best Animated Film	KPop Demon Hunters	Won	
San Diego Film Critics Society	December 15, 2025	Best Use of Music	KPop Demon Hunters	Nominated	
Seattle Film Critics Society	December 15, 2025	Best Animated Film	KPop Demon Hunters	Won	
Southeastern Film Critics Awards	December 15, 2025	Best Animated Film	KPop Demon Hunters	Won	
Dallas–Fort Worth Film Critics Association	December 17, 2025	Best Animated Film	KPop Demon Hunters	Won	
Austin Film Critics Association	December 18, 2025	Best Animated Film	KPop Demon Hunters	Won	
Austin Film Critics Association	December 18, 2025	Best Voice Acting/Animated/Digital Performance	Arden Cho and Ejae	Nominated	
Austin Film Critics Association	December 18, 2025	The Robert R. "Bobby" McCurdy Memorial Breakthrough Award	Maggie Kang	Won	
Florida Film Critics Circle	December 19, 2025	Best Animated Film	KPop Demon Hunters	Nominated	
Las Vegas Film Critics Society	December 19, 2025	Best Song	"Golden" – Ejae, Mark Sonnenblick, Joong Gyu Kwak, Yu Han Lee, Hee Dong Nam, Jeong Hoon Seo, and Teddy Park	Nominated	
Las Vegas Film Critics Society	December 19, 2025	Best Animated Film	KPop Demon Hunters	Nominated	
Las Vegas Film Critics Society	December 19, 2025	Best Family Film	KPop Demon Hunters	Won	
Online Association of Female Film Critics	December 19, 2025	Best Animated Feature	KPop Demon Hunters	Won	
Melon Music Awards	December 20, 2025	Song of the Year	"Golden" – Huntrix (Ejae, Audrey Nuna, and Rei Ami)	Nominated	
Melon Music Awards	December 20, 2025	Best OST	"Golden" – Huntrix (KPop Demon Hunters)	Won	
Boston Online Film Critics Association	December 20, 2025	Best Animated Film	KPop Demon Hunters	Won	
Philadelphia Film Critics Circle	December 20, 2025	Best Animated Film	KPop Demon Hunters	Won	
Black Film Critics Circle	December 20, 2025	Best Animated Feature	KPop Demon Hunters	Won	
Women Film Critics Circle	December 21, 2025	Best Animated Female	Rumi	Won	
Kansas City Film Critics Circle	December 21, 2025	Best Animated Feature	KPop Demon Hunters	Won	
New Mexico Film Critics Association Awards	December 21, 2025	Best Animated Film	KPop Demon Hunters	Runner-up	
New Mexico Film Critics Association Awards	December 21, 2025	Best Original Song	"Golden" – Ejae, Mark Sonnenblick, Ido, 24, and Teddy	Runner-up	
RTHK International Pop Poll Awards	December 23, 2025	Top Ten International Gold Songs	"Golden" (David Guetta Remix)	Won	
Time Magazine	December 25, 2025	Breakthrough of the Year	KPop Demon Hunters	Honored	
Georgia Film Critics Association	December 27, 2025	Best Animated Film	KPop Demon Hunters	Won	
Georgia Film Critics Association	December 27, 2025	Best Original Song	"Golden" – Ejae, Mark Sonnenblick, Ido, 24, and Teddy	Runner-up	
North Texas Film Critics Association	December 29, 2025	Best Animated Film	KPop Demon Hunters	Won	
New Jersey Film Critics Circle	December 31, 2025	Best Animated Feature	KPop Demon Hunters	Won	
New Jersey Film Critics Circle	December 31, 2025	Best Original Song	"Golden" – Ejae, Mark Sonnenblick, Ido, 24, and Teddy	Won	
Portland Critics Association	December 31, 2025	Best Animated Feature	KPop Demon Hunters	Nominated	
Alliance of Women Film Journalists	December 31, 2025	Best Animated Feature	KPop Demon Hunters – Maggie Kang and Chris Appelhans	Won	
Alliance of Women Film Journalists	December 31, 2025	Female Focus: Best Voice Performance in Animated Film	Arden Cho – KPop Demon Hunters	Won	
Puerto Rico Critics Association	January 2, 2026	Best Animated Feature	KPop Demon Hunters	Won	
Puerto Rico Critics Association	January 2, 2026	Best original song	"Golden" – Ejae, Mark Sonnenblick, Ido, 24, and Teddy	Won	
Minnesota Film Critics Association	January 2, 2026	Best Animated Feature	KPop Demon Hunters	Won	
Minnesota Film Critics Association	January 2, 2026	Best Music	KPop Demon Hunters	Nominated	
Critics' Choice Movie Awards	January 4, 2026	Best Animated Feature	KPop Demon Hunters	Won	
Critics' Choice Movie Awards	January 4, 2026	Best Song	"Golden" – Ejae, Mark Sonnenblick, Ido, 24, and Teddy	Won	
Oklahoma Film Critics Circle	January 5, 2026	Best Animated Film	KPop Demon Hunters	Won	
New York Film Critics Circle	January 6, 2026	Best Animated Film	KPop Demon Hunters	Won	
Korea First Brand Awards	January 6, 2026	Hot Icon (Female)	Huntrix	Won	
Capri Hollywood International Film Festival	January 6, 2026	Best Animated Feature	KPop Demon Hunters	Won	
Capri Hollywood International Film Festival	January 6, 2026	Best Original Song	"Golden" – Ejae and Mark Sonnenblick	Won	
Pittsburgh Film Critics Association	January 7, 2026	Best Animated Feature	KPop Demon Hunters	Won	
Pittsburgh Film Critics Association	January 7, 2026	Best Song	"Golden" – Ejae, Mark Sonnenblick, Ido, 24, and Teddy	Runner-up	
Pittsburgh Film Critics Association	January 7, 2026	Best Animated Voice Performance	Arden Cho — KPop Demon Hunters	Won	
Columbus Film Critics Association	January 8, 2026	Best Animated Film	KPop Demon Hunters	Runner-up	
Astra Film Awards	January 9, 2026	Best Animated Feature	KPop Demon Hunters	Won	
Astra Film Awards	January 9, 2026	Best Voice Over Performance	Arden Cho	Won	
Astra Film Awards	January 9, 2026	Best Original Song	"Golden" – Ejae, Mark Sonnenblick, Ido, 24, and Teddy	Won	
Critics Association Of Central Florida	January 9, 2026	Best Animated Film	KPop Demon Hunters	Won	
Critics Association Of Central Florida	January 9, 2026	Best Original Song	"Golden" – Ejae, Mark Sonnenblick, Ido, 24, and Teddy	Won	
Los Angeles Film Critics Association	January 10, 2026	Best Animation	KPop Demon Hunters	Runner-up	
Greater Western New York Film Critics Association	January 10, 2026	Best Animated Film	KPop Demon Hunters	Won	
Golden Globe Awards	January 11, 2026	Best Motion Picture – Animated	KPop Demon Hunters	Won	
Golden Globe Awards	January 11, 2026	Cinematic and Box Office Achievement	KPop Demon Hunters	Nominated	
Golden Globe Awards	January 11, 2026	Best Original Song – Motion Picture	"Golden" – Joong Gyu Kwak, Yu Han Lee, Hee Dong Nam, Jeong Hoon Seo, Park Hong Jun, Ejae, and Mark Sonnenblick	Won	
North Dakota Film Society	January 12, 2026	Best Animated Feature	KPop Demon Hunters – Chris Appelhans, Maggie Kang, Michelle L.M. Wong	Nominated	
North Dakota Film Society	January 12, 2026	Best Original Song	"Golden" – Ejae & Mark Sonnenblick	Won	
Music City Film Critics Association	January 12, 2026	Best Animated Film	KPop Demon Hunters	Nominated	
Music City Film Critics Association	January 12, 2026	Best Original Song	"Golden" – Ejae, Audrey Nuna, and Rei Ami	Nominated	
Music City Film Critics Association	January 12, 2026	Best Music Film	KPop Demon Hunters	Nominated	
Hawaii Film Critics Society	January 12, 2026	Best Animated Film	KPop Demon Hunters	Won	
Golden Tomato Awards	January 13, 2026	Best Animated Movies	KPop Demon Hunters	Nominated	
Golden Tomato Awards	January 13, 2026	Best Musical Movie	KPop Demon Hunters	Won	
Chicago Indie Critics	January 15, 2026	Best Animated Film	KPop Demon Hunters — Maggie Kang, Chris Applehans, and Michelle Wong	Won	
Chicago Indie Critics	January 15, 2026	Best Original Song	"Golden" – Ejae, Mark Sonnenblick, Ido, 24, and Teddy	Nominated	
American Cinematheque	January 16, 2026	Tribute to the Crafts Feature Film Song	"Golden" – Ejae, Mark Sonnenblick, Ido, 24, and Teddy	Honored	
Utah Film Critics Association	January 17, 2026	Best Animated Feature	KPop Demon Hunters	Runner-up	
Houston Film Critics Society	January 20, 2026	Best Animated Feature	KPop Demon Hunters	Won	
Houston Film Critics Society	January 20, 2026	Best Original Song	"Golden" – Ejae, Mark Sonnenblick, Ido, 24, and Teddy	Won	
Choreo Awards	January 24, 2026	K-Pop Choreography Discovery Award	"Soda Pop" – Ha Sung-jin and Leejung Lee	Won	
Denver Film Critics Society	January 24, 2026	Best Animated Film	KPop Demon Hunters	Won	
Denver Film Critics Society	January 24, 2026	Best Song	"Golden" – Ejae, Mark Sonnenblick, Ido, 24, and Teddy	Won	
Denver Film Critics Society	January 24, 2026	Best Non-Live Action Performance	Arden Cho	Nominated	
DiscussingFilm's Global Film Critics Awards	January 24–25, 2026	Best Animated Feature	KPop Demon Hunters	Won	
DiscussingFilm's Global Film Critics Awards	January 24–25, 2026	Best Original Song	"Golden" – Ejae, Mark Sonnenblick, Ido, 24, and Teddy	Won	
Online Film Critics Society	January 26, 2026	Best Animated Feature	KPop Demon Hunters	Won	
North Carolina Film Critics Association	January 26, 2026	Best Animated Film	KPop Demon Hunters	Won	
North Carolina Film Critics Association	January 26, 2026	Best Original Song	"Golden" – Ejae, Mark Sonnenblick, Ido, 24, and Teddy	Won	
North Carolina Film Critics Association	January 26, 2026	Best Original Song	"What It Sounds Like" – Ejae, Daniel Rojas, Mark Sonnenblick, 24, Ido, Teddy	Nominated	
North Carolina Film Critics Association	January 26, 2026	Best Voice Performance In Animation or Mixed Media	Arden Cho	Won	
North Carolina Film Critics Association	January 26, 2026	Best Voice Performance In Animation or Mixed Media	May Hong	Nominated	
North Carolina Film Critics Association	January 26, 2026	Best Voice Performance In Animation or Mixed Media	Ji-young Yoo	Nominated	
London Film Critics Circle Awards	February 1, 2026	Animated Feature of the Year	KPop Demon Hunters	Won	
Grammy Awards	February 1, 2026	Song of the Year	"Golden" – Ejae, Park Hong Jun, Joong Gyu Kwak, Yu Han Lee, Hee Dong Nam, Jeong Hoon Seo, and Mark Sonnenblick, songwriters (Huntrix: Ejae, Audrey Nuna, and Rei Ami)	Nominated	
Grammy Awards	February 1, 2026	Best Song Written for Visual Media	"Golden" – Ejae, Park Hong Jun, Joong Gyu Kwak, Yu Han Lee, Hee Dong Nam, Jeong Hoon Seo, and Mark Sonnenblick, songwriters (Huntrix: Ejae, Audrey Nuna, and Rei Ami)	Won	
Grammy Awards	February 1, 2026	Best Pop Duo/Group Performance	"Golden" – Ejae, Audrey Nuna, and Rei Ami	Nominated	
Grammy Awards	February 1, 2026	Best Remixed Recording	"Golden" (David Guetta Remix) – David Guetta	Nominated	
Grammy Awards	February 1, 2026	Best Compilation Soundtrack for Visual Media	KPop Demon Hunters – Spring Aspers & Dana Sano (compilation producers); Ian Eisendrath (music supervisor) (Performed by Various Artists)	Nominated	
AACTA Awards	February 4, 2026	Audience Choice Award for Favourite Film	KPop Demon Hunters	Nominated	
Society of Composers & Lyricists Awards	February 6, 2026	Outstanding Original Song for a Comedy or Musical Visual Media Production	"Golden" – Ejae & Mark Sonnenblick	Won	
International Cinephile Society	February 8, 2026	Best Animated Film	KPop Demon Hunters – Chris Appelhans, Maggie Kang	Nominated	
African-American Film Critics Association	February 8, 2026	Best Animated Feature	KPop Demon Hunters	Won	
Latino Entertainment Journalists Association	February 9, 2026	Best Animated Feature	KPop Demon Hunters – Maggie Kang and Chris Appelhans	Won	
Latino Entertainment Journalists Association	February 9, 2026	Best Song	"Golden" – Ejae, Ido, Yu Han Lee, Hee Dong Nam, Mark Sonnenblick, Teddy & 24	Won	
Advanced Imaging Society Lumiere Awards	February 9, 2026	Best Original Song	"Golden" – Ejae, Ido, Yu Han Lee, Hee Dong Nam, Mark Sonnenblick, Teddy & 24	Won	
Advanced Imaging Society Lumiere Awards	February 9, 2026	Best Musical Scene or Sequence	"Golden" – Ejae, Audrey Nuna, Rei Ami	Won	
Santa Barbara International Film Festival	February 4–14, 2026	Variety Artisans Award	Ejae – "Golden" from KPop Demon Hunters – Original Song	Won	
Hanteo Music Awards	February 15, 2026	Best Popular Artist	KPop Demon Hunters Cast	Nominated	
Hanteo Music Awards	February 15, 2026	Special Award (OST)	KPop Demon Hunters Cast	Nominated	
Hanteo Music Awards	February 15, 2026	Global Popular Artist – Africa	KPop Demon Hunters Cast	Nominated	
Hanteo Music Awards	February 15, 2026	Global Popular Artist – Asia	KPop Demon Hunters Cast	Nominated	
Hanteo Music Awards	February 15, 2026	Global Popular Artist – Europe	KPop Demon Hunters Cast	Nominated	
Hanteo Music Awards	February 15, 2026	Global Popular Artist – North America	KPop Demon Hunters Cast	Nominated	
Hanteo Music Awards	February 15, 2026	Global Popular Artist – South America	KPop Demon Hunters Cast	Nominated	
Hanteo Music Awards	February 15, 2026	Global Popular Artist – Oceania	KPop Demon Hunters Cast	Nominated	
The Online Film & Television Association	February 15, 2026	Best Animated Feature	KPop Demon Hunters	Won	
The Online Film & Television Association	February 15, 2026	Best Voice-Over Performance	Arden Cho	Won	
The Online Film & Television Association	February 15, 2026	Best Original Song	"Golden" – Ejae, Ido, Yu Han Lee, Hee Dong Nam, Mark Sonnenblick, Teddy & 24	Runner-up	
Annie Awards	February 21, 2026	Best Feature	KPop Demon Hunters	Won	
Annie Awards	February 21, 2026	Best FX – Feature	Filippo Macari, Nicola Finizio, Simon Lewis, Naoki Kato, Daniel La Chapelle	Won	
Annie Awards	February 21, 2026	Best Character Animation – Feature	Ryusuke Furuya	Won	
Annie Awards	February 21, 2026	Best Character Design – Feature	Scott Watanabe and Ami Thompson	Won	
Annie Awards	February 21, 2026	Best Direction – Feature	Maggie Kang and Chris Appelhans	Won	
Annie Awards	February 21, 2026	Best Music – Feature	KPop Demon Hunters Music Team	Won	
Annie Awards	February 21, 2026	Best Production Design – Feature	Helen Chen, Dave Bleich, Wendell Dalit, Scott Watanabe, and Celine Kim	Won	
Annie Awards	February 21, 2026	Best Voice Acting – Feature	Arden Cho	Won	
Annie Awards	February 21, 2026	Best Writing – Feature	Danya Jimenez, Hannah McMechan, Maggie Kang, and Chris Appelhans	Won	
Annie Awards	February 21, 2026	Best Editorial – Feature	KPop Demon Hunters Editorial Team	Won	
Kidscreen Awards	February 25, 2026	Best One-Off, Special or TV Movie	KPop Demon Hunters	Won	
Visual Effects Society	February 25, 2026	Outstanding Animation in an Animated Feature	Joshua Beveridge, Jacky Priddle, Benjamin Hendricks, Clara Chan	Won	
Visual Effects Society	February 25, 2026	Outstanding Character in an Animated Feature	Sophia (Seung Hee) Lee, Andrea Centeno, Marc Souliere, and Joshua Beveridge (for "Rumi")	Won	
Visual Effects Society	February 25, 2026	Outstanding Environment in an Animated Feature	Rafael Lescano, Gunsik Kim, Tyquane Wright, and Hee-Chel Nam (for "Seoul")	Nominated	
Visual Effects Society	February 25, 2026	Outstanding CG Cinematography	Benjamin Hendricks, Gary H. Lee, Randolph Lizarda, and Linh Mai Nguyen Chan	Nominated	
Visual Effects Society	February 25, 2026	Outstanding Effects Simulations in an Animated Feature	Filippo Maccari, Nikolaos Finizio, Daniel La Chapelle, and Srdjan Milosevic	Won	
Gold Derby Film Awards	February 26, 2026	Best Animated Feature	KPop Demon Hunters	Won	
Gold Derby Film Awards	February 26, 2026	Best Original Song	"Golden" — Ejae, Mark Sonnenblick, Joong Gyu Kwak, Yu Han Lee, Hee Dong Nam, Jeong Hoon Seon, and Teddy Park	Won	
American Cinema Editors	February 27, 2026	Best Edited Animated Feature Film	KPop Demon Hunters – Nathan Schauf	Won	
Art Directors Guild Awards	February 28, 2026	Best Animated Feature Film	KPop Demon Hunters – Mingjue Helen Chen, Dave Bleich	Won	
Producers Guild Awards	February 28, 2026	Award for Outstanding Producer of Animated Theatrical Motion Pictures	KPop Demon Hunters – Michelle L.M. Wong	Won	
Brit Awards	February 28, 2026	International Group of the Year	Huntrix, Ejae / Audrey Nuna/ Rei Ami	Nominated	
Brit Awards	February 28, 2026	International Song of the Year	Huntrix, Ejae / Audrey Nuna/ Rei Ami - Golden	Nominated	
NAACP Image Award	February 28, 2026	Outstanding Animated Motion Picture	KPop Demon Hunters	Nominated	
Dorian Award	March 3, 2026	Animated Film of the Year	KPop Demon Hunters	Won	
Dorian Award	March 3, 2026	Film Music of the Year	KPop Demon Hunters	Nominated	
Cinema Audio Society Awards	March 7, 2026	Motion Pictures – Animated	KPop Demon Hunters – Howard London, Michael Babcock, Tony Lamberti, Erich Talaba, Giorgi Lekishvili	Won	
Unforgettable Awards	March 7, 2026	Vanguard Award	KPop Demon Hunters	Honored	
Saturn Awards	March 8, 2026	Best Animated Film	KPop Demon Hunters	Nominated	
Golden Reel Awards	March 8, 2026	Outstanding Achievement in Sound Editing – Feature Animation	Michael Babcock, Branden Spencer, Chris Diebold, Jeff Sawyer, Trevor Gates, Katie Halliday, Goeun Lee Everett, Russell Topal, Ian Herzon, and Beso Kacharava	Nominated	
Golden Reel Awards	March 8, 2026	Outstanding Achievement in Music Editing – Feature Motion Picture	Oren Yaacoby	Nominated	
Satellite Awards	March 10, 2026	Best Motion Picture – Animated or Mixed Media	KPop Demon Hunters	Nominated	
Satellite Awards	March 10, 2026	Best Original Song	"Golden" – Joong Gyu Kwak, Yu Han Lee, Hee Dong Nam, Jeong Hoon Seo, Park Hong Jun, Ejae, and Mark Sonnenblick	Nominated	
Japan Gold Disc Award	March 12, 2026	Song of the Year by Download (Asia)	"Golden" – Ejae, Audrey Nuna, Rei Ami	Won	
Japan Gold Disc Award	March 12, 2026	Song of the Year by Streaming (Asia)	"Golden" – Ejae, Audrey Nuna, Rei Ami	Won	
ICG Publicists Awards	March 13, 2026	Maxwell Weinberg Award for Motion Picture Publicity Campaign	KPop Demon Hunters	Nominated	
Academy Awards	March 15, 2026	Best Animated Feature	KPop Demon Hunters – Maggie Kang, Chris Appelhans, and Michelle L.M. Wong	Won	
Academy Awards	March 15, 2026	Best Original Song	"Golden" – Ejae, Mark Sonnenblick, Joong Gyu Kwak, Yu Han Lee, Hee Dong Nam, Jeong Hoon Seo, and Teddy Park	Won	
iHeartRadio Music Awards	March 26, 2026	Duo/Group of the Year	Huntrix – Ejae, Audrey Nuna, and Rei Ami	Won	
iHeartRadio Music Awards	March 26, 2026	Pop Song of the Year	"Golden" – Ejae, Audrey Nuna, and Rei Ami	Nominated	
iHeartRadio Music Awards	March 26, 2026	K-pop Song of the Year	"Golden" – Ejae, Audrey Nuna, and Rei Ami	Won	
iHeartRadio Music Awards	March 26, 2026	Best Lyrics	"Golden" – Ejae, Audrey Nuna, and Rei Ami	Nominated	
iHeartRadio Music Awards	March 26, 2026	Favorite Soundtrack	KPop Demon Hunters	Won	
NHMC's Annual Impact Awards	April 24, 2026	Storytelling Impact Award	Danya Jimenez and Hannah McMechan	Honored	
BFE Cut Above Awards	April 29, 2026	Best Edited Single Animation	Nathan Schauf	Won	
Billboard Women in Music	April 29, 2026	Billboard Women of the Year	Huntrix – Ejae, Audrey Nuna, and Rei Ami	Honored	
ASCAP Pop Music Awards	April 30, 2026	Songwriter Award	Ejae – "Golden"	Honored	
American Music Awards	May 25, 2026	Song of the Year	"Golden" – Huntrix: Ejae, Audrey Nuna & Rei Ami	Won	
American Music Awards	May 25, 2026	Best Pop Song	"Golden" – Huntrix: Ejae, Audrey Nuna & Rei Ami	Won	
American Music Awards	May 25, 2026	Best Vocal Performance	"Golden" – Huntrix: Ejae, Audrey Nuna & Rei Ami	Won	
American Music Awards	May 25, 2026	Best Soundtrack	KPop Demon Hunters	Won	
Golden Trailer Awards	May 28, 2026	Best Animation/Family	KPop Demon Hunters – Legends, Netflix and Sony Pictures Animation, Major Major	Nominated	
Golden Trailer Awards	May 28, 2026	Best Animation/Family Poster	KPop Demon Hunters – Payoff Poster, Netflix, AV Print	Won	
Nebula Award	June 6, 2026	Ray Bradbury Nebula Award for Outstanding Dramatic Presentation	KPop Demon Hunters – Danya Jimenez, Hannah McMechan, and Maggie Kang	Nominated	
Music Awards Japan	June 13, 2026	Best Song Asia	"Golden" – Huntrix	Won	
Music Awards Japan	June 13, 2026	Best International Pop Song in Japan	"Golden" – Huntrix	Nominated	
Music Awards Japan	June 13, 2026	Best of Listeners' Choice: International Song powered by Spotify	"Golden" – Huntrix	Nominated	
Music Awards Japan	June 13, 2026	Best of Listeners' Choice: International Song powered by Spotify	"Soda Pop" – Saja Boys	Nominated	
SEC Awards	June 28, 2026	Best Streaming Film	KPop Demon Hunters	Won	
SEC Awards	June 28, 2026	International Song of the Year	"Golden" – Huntrix	Nominated	
Hugo Awards	August 30, 2026	Best Dramatic Presentation, Long Form	KPop Demon Hunters – Danya Jimenez, Hannah McMechan, Maggie Kang, and Chris Appelhans	Nominated	
Humanitas Prize	September 9, 2026	Family Feature	KPop Demon Hunters – Danya Jimenez, Hannah McMechan, Maggie Kang, and Chris Appelhans	Nominated	
MTV Video Music Awards	September 27, 2026	Song of the Year	"Golden" – Huntrix	Nominated	
World Soundtrack Awards	October 10, 2026	Best Original Song	"Golden" – Ejae, Mark Sonnenblick, Teddy Park, Joong Gyu Kwak, Yu Han Lee, Hee Dong Nam, Jeong Hoon Seo	Won	
World Soundtrack Awards	October 10, 2026	Public Choice Award	KPop Demon Hunters – Marcelo Zarvos	Nominated	
Songwriters of North America	October 29, 2026	Global Impact Award	KPop Demon Hunters soundtrack – The Songwriting team	Honored	
Nickelodeon Kids' Choice Awards	November 14, 2026	Favorite Animated Movie	KPop Demon Hunters	Nominated	
Nickelodeon Kids' Choice Awards	November 14, 2026	Favorite Female Animated Voice from a Movie	Arden Cho	Won	
Nickelodeon Kids' Choice Awards	November 14, 2026	Favorite Male Animated Voice from a Movie	Ahn Hyo-seop	Won	
Nickelodeon Kids' Choice Awards	November 14, 2026	Favorite Song from a Movie	"Golden" – Ejae, Audrey Nuna and Rei Ami	Won	
Nickelodeon Kids' Choice Awards	November 14, 2026	Favorite On-Screen Duo/Trio	Arden Cho, Ji-young Yoo, and May Hong	Nominated	
