= How It's Done (Huntrix song) =

2025 song by Huntrix

Single by Huntrix

from the album KPop Demon Hunters
- Language: English; Korean
- Released: January 13, 2026
- Genre: K-pop; electropop; hip-hop
- Length: 2:56
- Label: Republic; Visva
- Songwriters: Danny Chung; Ejae; Daniel Rojas; Mark Sonnenblick; 24; Ido; Teddy
- Producers: 24; Ido; Teddy; Ian Eisendrath

KPop Demon Hunters singles chronology
"Golden" (2025)	"How It's Done" (2026)

Ejae singles chronology
"In Another World" (2025)	"How It's Done" (2026)	"Time After Time" (2026)

Lyric video
- "How It's Done" on YouTube

"How It's Done" is a song performed by Ejae, Audrey Nuna, and Rei Ami as the fictional K-pop girl group Huntrix in the 2025 animated musical urban fantasy film KPop Demon Hunters. It was released on August 27, 2025, through Republic Records, as the third single from the film's soundtrack album; it then officially impacted US contemporary hit radio on January 13, 2026.

== Background and release ==
The animated musical fantasy film KPop Demon Hunters was released on Netflix on June 20, 2025. The film follows the fictional K-pop girl group Huntrix, consisting of members Rumi, Mira, and Zoey, whose singing voices are performed by Ejae, Audrey Nuna, and Rei Ami, respectively. The film's accompanying soundtrack album was released on the same day, with "How It's Done" as the second track.

"How It's Done" was released by Republic Records as a single on August 27, 2025. In January 2026, the song officially impacted US contemporary hit radio. In April 2026, the Huntrix singers performed an abridged version of "How It's Done" as part of a McDonald's collaboration. On October 26, 2026, Netflix released an animated choreography video, featuring Rumi, Mira, and Zoey, for the song.

== Lyrics and composition ==
"How It's Done" serves as the opening track of the film KPop Demon Hunters that introduces the film's protagonists Rumi, Mira, and Zoey. In the scene, the trio sing the anthem as they battle a group of demons posing as members of their private jet's flight crew before dropping into a stadium of fans to finish the song as the girl group Huntrix. The team took inspiration from "Jet Song" from West Side Story, which introduced the Jets, and wanted a similar introduction for the fictional band. According to the producer Ian Eisendrath, he wanted to set up a unique sonic world for the band and create a song that "felt like when you first heard Blackpink." Ejae referred to "How It's Done" as "the hardest song" of the songs she worked on for the film.

The song went through several different iterations on finding the beat and tempo. On the song's development, Ejae stated that they tried "to find a hook that's hook-y" as well needing to create "a melody that's good enough that can pierce through" the track. She explained that the song's raps "took full advantage of K-pop writing", noting their strategic approach of blending rap and theater styles where "all the verses had rap, so we could put all the storyline in there, and the chorus could be as simple as possible".

== Reception ==
Billboard placed "How It's Done" in the fourth position in their ranking of songs from the soundtrack, describing it as a "perfect introduction" for the characters and the film.

The 2026 live performance for the McDonald's app was criticized for being abridged. Kenneth Shepard of Kotaku opined that the cuts to the song "are especially tough because they skip over the second verse, which is the best part of the song". Additionally, Aimee Hart of Polygon highlighted fan disappointment to the performance "due to the trio assumingly lip-syncing"; however, there was also fan praise for the "cool and stylish" performance by Ejae, Audrey Nuna, and Rei Ami.

== Track listing ==
Digital download, streaming, and 7-inch vinyl

1. "How It's Done" – 2:56
2. "How It's Done" (instrumental) – 2:55

== Charts ==
=== Weekly charts ===
Weekly chart performance
Chart (2025–2026)	Peak position
Australia (ARIA)	7
Austria (Ö3 Austria Top 40)	9
Canada Hot 100 (Billboard)	9
Czech Republic Singles Digital (ČNS IFPI)	31
Denmark (Tracklisten)	39
France (SNEP)	100
Germany (GfK)	7
Global 200 (Billboard)	5
Greece International (IFPI)	29
Hong Kong (Billboard)	24
Hungary (Single Top 40)	38
Iceland (Tónlistinn)	8
Ireland (IRMA)	15
Israel (Mako Hitlist)	68
Italy (FIMI)	97
Lithuania (AGATA)	67
Malaysia (IFPI)	9
Malaysia International Streaming (RIM)	6
Netherlands (Single Top 100)	39
New Zealand (Recorded Music NZ)	6
Norway (IFPI Norge)	12
Philippines (IFPI)	17
Philippines Hot 100 (Billboard Philippines)	12
Poland (Polish Streaming Top 100)	36
Portugal (AFP)	51
Singapore (RIAS)	9
Slovakia Singles Digital (ČNS IFPI)	30
South Korea (Circle)	10
Spain (Promusicae)	85
Sweden (Sverigetopplistan)	12
Switzerland (Schweizer Hitparade)	18
Taiwan (Billboard)	9
United Arab Emirates (IFPI)	18
UK Singles (Official Charts)	9
US Billboard Hot 100	8
US Hot Dance/Pop Songs (Billboard)	1
US Pop Airplay (Billboard)	31
Vietnam (Vietnam Hot 100)	90

=== Monthly charts ===
Monthly chart performance
Chart (2025)	Peak position
South Korea (Circle)	11

=== Year-end charts ===
Year-end chart performance
Chart (2025)	Position
Australia (ARIA)	46
Austria (Ö3 Austria Top 40)	58
Canada (Canadian Hot 100)	56
Germany (GfK)	63
Global 200 (Billboard)	96
New Zealand (Recorded Music NZ)	37
Norway (IFPI Norge)	87
Philippines (Philippines Hot 100)	94
South Korea (Circle)	80
Switzerland (Schweizer Hitparade)	95
US Billboard Hot 100	68
US Hot Dance/Pop Songs (Billboard)	3

== Certifications ==
Certifications
Region	Certification	Certified units/sales
Australia (ARIA)	2× Platinum	140,000^{‡}
Austria (IFPI Austria)	Gold	15,000^{‡}
Belgium (BRMA)	Gold	20,000^{‡}
Brazil (Pro-Música Brasil)	3× Platinum	120,000^{‡}
Denmark (IFPI Danmark)	Gold	45,000^{‡}
France (SNEP)	Gold	100,000^{‡}
Mexico (AMPROFON)	Gold	70,000^{‡}
New Zealand (RMNZ)	Platinum	30,000^{‡}
Poland (ZPAV)	Platinum	125,000^{‡}
Portugal (AFP)	Gold	12,000^{‡}
Spain (Promusicae)	Gold	50,000^{‡}
Switzerland (IFPI Switzerland)	Gold	15,000^{‡}
United Kingdom (BPI)	Platinum	600,000^{‡}
United States (RIAA)	Platinum	1,000,000^{‡}
^{‡} Sales+streaming figures based on certification alone.

== Release history ==
Release dates and formats
Region	Date	Format	Version	Label	Ref.
Various	August 27, 2025	Digital download; streaming	Original; instrumental	Republic	
Various	November 21, 2025	7-inch vinyl	Original; instrumental	Republic	
United States	January 13, 2026	Contemporary hit radio	Original	Republic	
Italy	March 13, 2026	Radio airplay	Original	Island	
