= Time After Time (Ejae song) =

Single by Ejae
- Released: February 6, 2026
- Genre: Pop
- Length: 2:48
- Label: Lunamu; Universal
- Songwriters: Ejae; Rollo; Vaughn Oliver; Drew Scott
- Producer: Vaughn Oliver

Ejae singles chronology
"How It's Done" (2026)	"Time After Time" (2026)	"DNA (More Than a Game)" (2026)

Lyric video
- "Time After Time" on YouTube

"Time After Time" is a song by South Korean and American singer-songwriter Ejae. It was written by Ejae, Rollo, Drew Scott, and its producer Vaughn Oliver. The song was released on February 6, 2026, as her second solo single following the release of "In Another World" in October 2025.

The song is an upbeat dance track that has been described as a "heartbreak anthem", with lyrics about the singer's fixation on a former relationship.

== Composition and production ==
According to Ejae, she first wrote "Time After Time" in 2018 under a different title. Despite writing the song about her fiancé around the time they met, she originally intended to pitch the song to another artist. The song had begun with a "very simple chord progression and melody" that evolved over the years, but lacked a clear concept until Ejae enlisted the English songwriter Rollo Spreckley and the record producer Vaughn Oliver to rewrite the song. They retained the song's hook to convey the fast-paced feeling of "chasing this person who you wanted to move away from, but for some reason, you just come back to the same person over and over again".

Jon Pareles of The New York Times described the song as a "peppy tune" with lyrics that serve as a "morbid undercurrent under its insistent hooks".

== Release ==
"Time After Time" was first teased on Instagram on January 27, 2026, before its release on February 6, 2026. A lyric video was released on February 13, 2026.

The song was released in partnership with Volvo Cars, and uses the turn signal sound of the Volvo XC60 as a musical element. As a part of the partnership, Ejae appeared in a Volvo ad where she picks up her fiancé Sam Kim and plays "Time After Time" for him in the car. She described the ad as "very much true to what I do as a songwriter".

== Credits and personnel ==
Credits adapted from Tidal.

- Ejae – vocals
- Vaughn Oliver – producer, composer, piano, programmer, synthesizer
- Rollo – songwriter
- Drew Scott – composer
- Dale Becker – mastering engineer
- Tom Norris – mixing engineer

== Charts ==
Chart performance for "Time After Time"
Chart (2026)	Peak position
South Korea BGM (Circle)	148
South Korea Download (Circle)	163
