= Ejae =

South Korean and American singer (born 1991)

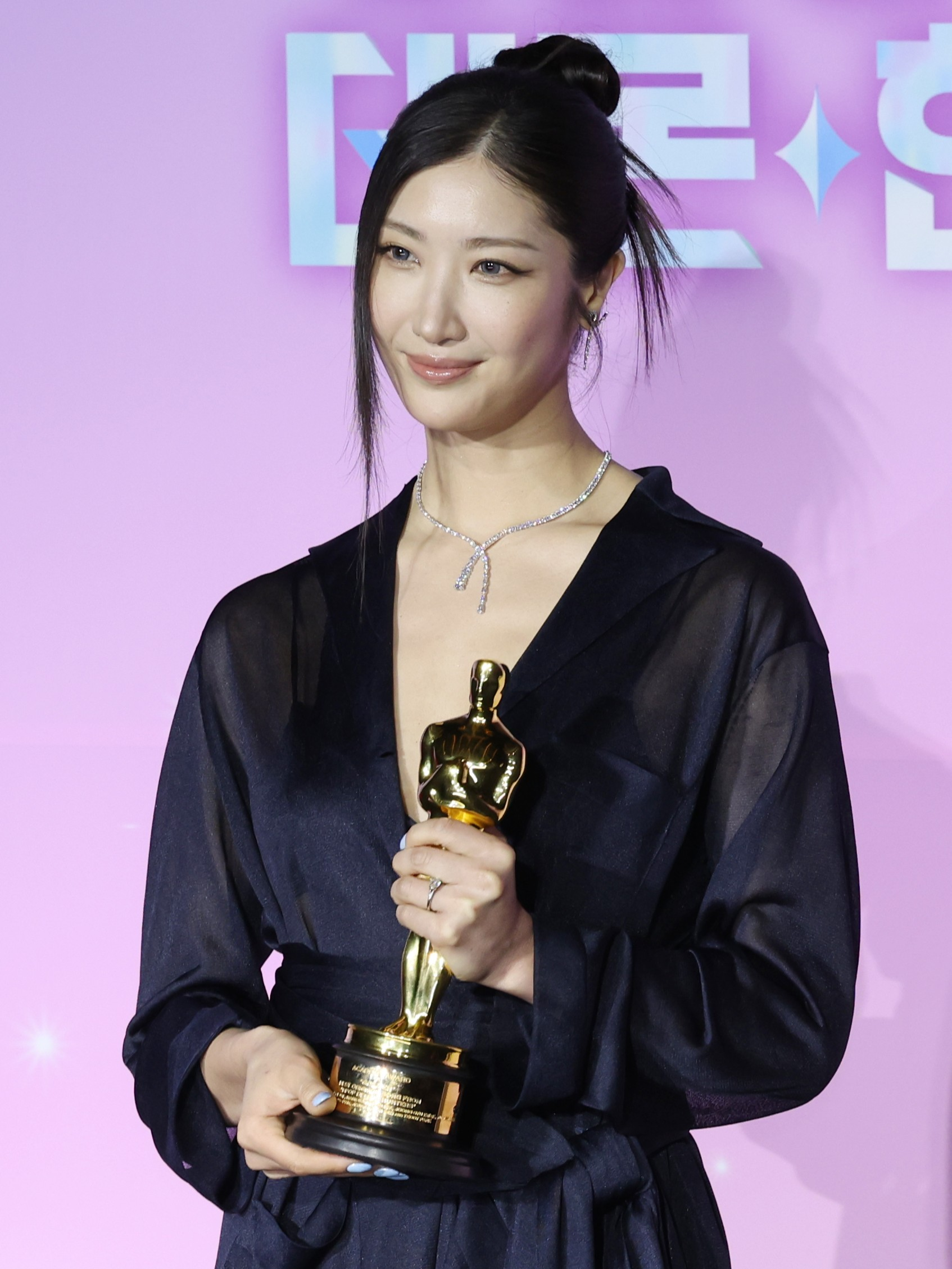
- Ejae in April 2026

Background information
- Born: Kim Eun-jae; December 6, 1991 (age 34); Seoul, South Korea
- Genres: K-pop; pop; R&B
- Occupations: Singer; songwriter; record producer
- Instrument: Vocals
- Years active: 2016–present
- Labels: Lunamu; Imperial
- Spouse: Sam Kim (m. 2026)

Korean name
- Hangul: 김은재
- RR: Gim Eunjae
- MR: Kim Ŭnjae

Stage name
- Hangul: 이재
- RR: Ijae
- MR: Ijae

Kim Eun-jae (Korean: 김은재; born December 6, 1991), known professionally as Ejae (stylized in all caps; 이재), is a South Korean and American (Note: Multiple sources:) singer, songwriter, and record producer.

A graduate of New York University Tisch School of the Arts, Ejae started as a trainee for SM Entertainment in 2003 but did not debut as a soloist or music group member. She moved into songwriting and producing and initially became known for her work with K-pop acts Red Velvet, Aespa, Twice, Le Sserafim, and other South Korean artists. She co-wrote the topline for "Psycho" for girl group Red Velvet, which topped the US Billboard World Digital Songs chart.

Ejae had her international breakthrough in 2025, providing the singing voice for Rumi in the Sony Pictures Animation and Netflix film KPop Demon Hunters (2025) and co-writing several songs on its soundtrack. "Golden", one of the songs she co-performed and co-wrote for the film, topped the Billboard Hot 100 and other global music charts, and earned four Grammy Award nominations (including Song of the Year). It became the first K-pop song to win numerous North American industry awards, including the Grammy Award for Best Song Written for Visual Media, the Golden Globe Award for Best Original Song, and the Academy Award for Best Original Song. Ejae released her debut solo single "In Another World" on October 24, 2025, followed by "Time After Time" on February 6, 2026.

== Early life and education ==
Ejae was born on December 6, 1991, in Seoul, South Korea. When she was six months old, the family moved to Fort Lee, New Jersey, where she spent several years of her childhood. She moved back to South Korea at the age of eight, where she attended Seoul Foreign School. After returning to the United States for high school and graduating, she studied at the New York University Tisch School of the Arts, where she received a BFA from Tisch's Clive Davis Institute of Recorded Music in 2014.

== Career ==
=== Beginning ===
At the age of 11, Ejae started out as a trainee for SM Entertainment for almost 10 years beginning in 2003. However, approval for her debut did not happen, either with a group or as a soloist. In 2011, she took a break from training to finish her studies. By 2015, her contract ended, and she was dropped from the label, bringing her idol training to an end.

=== 2016–2024: Songwriting and producing ===
After graduating from college, Ejae switched to songwriting and producing. During this time, she was invited to sing on the soundtrack of a K-drama. While recording, she met a producer, Shinsadong Tiger. He then invited her to write a song in his studio. That song became "Hello", which was cut for Hani of EXID. She then met Andrew Choi, who became her mentor. Ejae's songwriting "passion crystallized in 2017 when she attended her first SM Entertainment songwriting camp". Her first big break came when she co-wrote the topline for "Psycho" for Red Velvet, which went on to top the US Billboard World Digital Songs chart. It led to more opportunities to work with SM Entertainment. In 2019, she was featured on the soundtrack of the K-drama Woman of 9.9 Billion.

During the COVID-19 pandemic, Ejae co-wrote "Drama" for Aespa. She also helped co-produce the Girl Crush K-pop Vocals sample pack for producing K-pop songs. In 2022, she worked with Red Velvet again on the lead single "Birthday". In 2025, Ejae signed with Prescription Songs, an independent music publisher founded by Dr. Luke.

=== 2025–present: KPop Demon Hunters and rise to superstardom ===
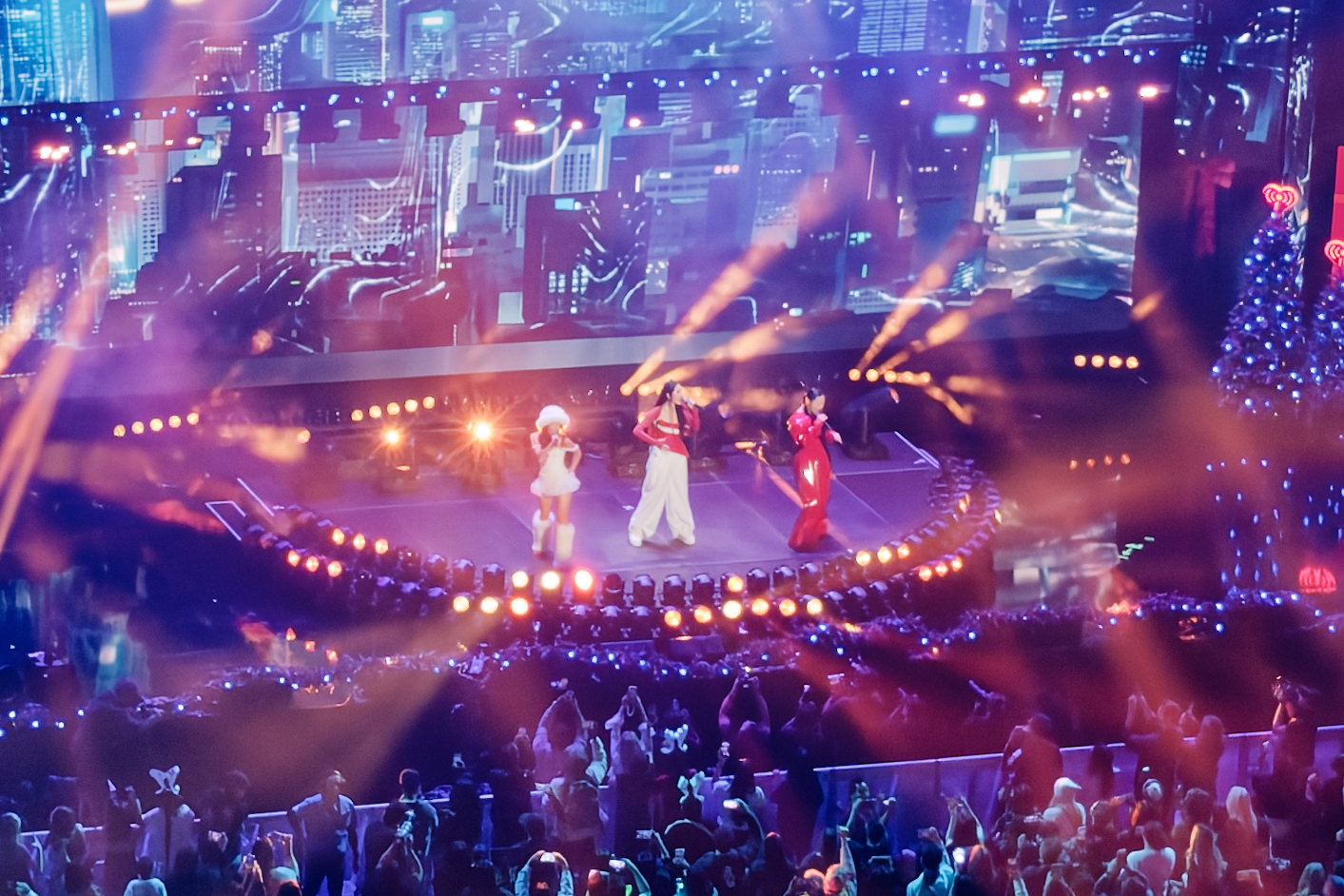
From left to right, the Huntrix singers Rei Ami, Ejae, and Audrey Nuna performing "Golden" at the 2025 KIIS-FM Jingle Ball.

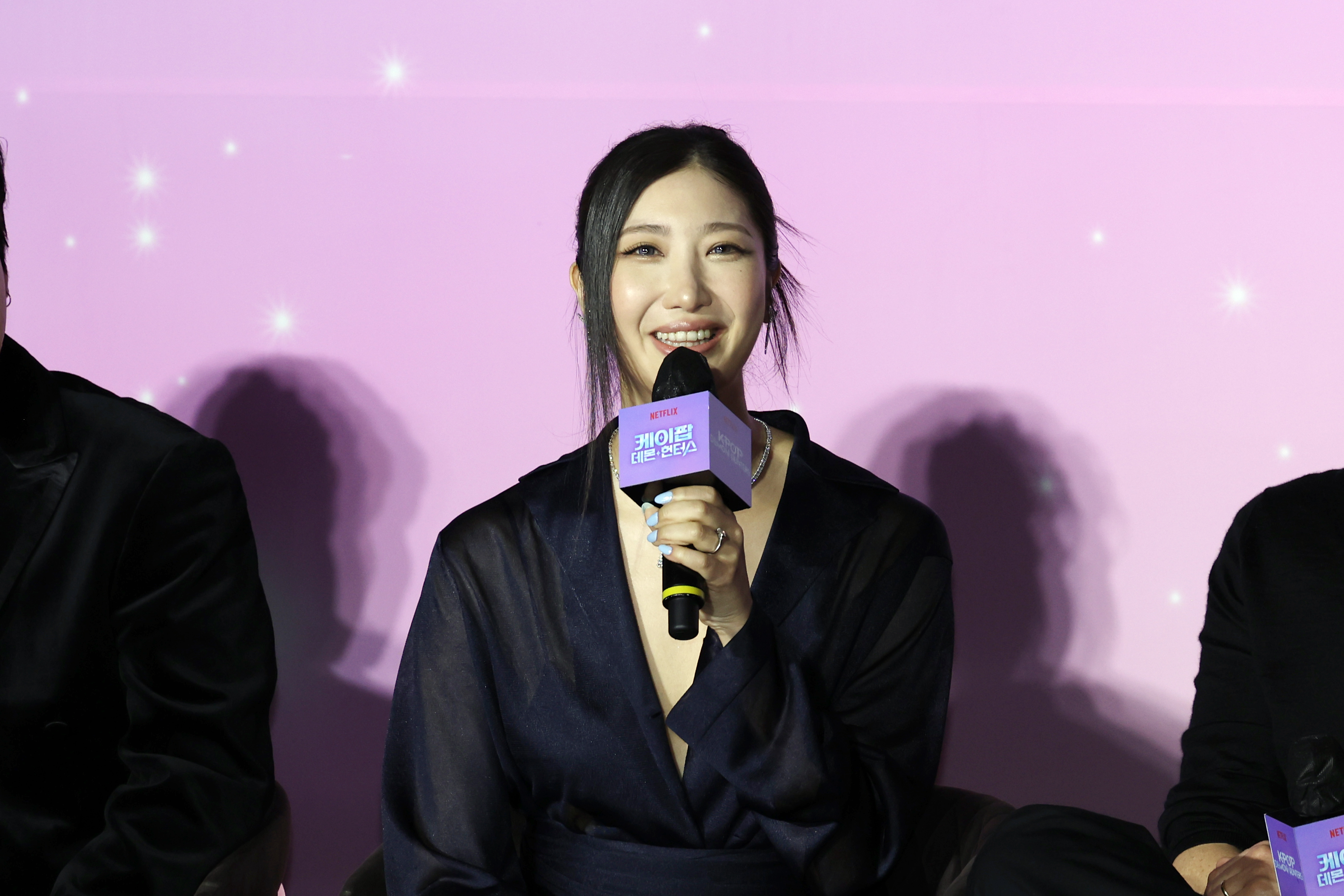
Kim in 2026

In April 2025, it was announced that Ejae would be featured on the soundtrack of the Netflix film KPop Demon Hunters. She also wrote several of the songs on the soundtrack. Director Maggie Kang attributed Ejae's demos as one of the reasons the film was greenlit; Ejae explained she had co-written and recorded "most of the demos" for the film when the directors then asked her to be the official singing voice for the character Rumi. The film received positive reviews for its soundtrack. The soundtrack also charted at number one on the Billboard 200. One of the songs she co-wrote and performed, "Golden", topped the Billboard Hot 100. On "Golden"'s composition, Ars Technica commented that the song "spans an impressive three-octave range, eventually hitting an A-5 on the chorus–a high note usually reserved for classically trained operatic sopranos" and Ejae's "performance on this song has impressed a lot of YouTube vocal coaches". The Korea Herald similarly highlighted Ejae's "Golden" performance, noting "the result is both technically impressive and emotionally resonant, a combination that has resonated with audiences far beyond the film". On August 18, 2025, Billboard highlighted that songs from the film's soundtrack "claim four of the top five on the Billboard Global 200 chart" and that only "four [other] elite albums", three by Taylor Swift and one by Drake, "have generated as many as four concurrent top five hits" on the Global 200 since the chart's debut in September 2020. Kim is credited on three of these charting songs; in addition to "Golden", Ejae co-wrote and performed "How It's Done" and co-wrote "Your Idol". Kim noted she reached a high note of D6 during the adlib background vocals of "How It's Done".

In July 2025, YouTube channel Studio USOG announced Ejae will contribute a song to the "Another Day of Debut Training" project, with all profits being donated to descendants of Korean independence activists. On August 14, 2025, the group formed through the web series, TDYA, debuted with the song "Keep the Light" composed by Kim and performed the song for the first time the following day at Gwanghwamun Square in Jongno-gu, Seoul in a set of performances celebrating the 80th National Liberation Day of Korea.

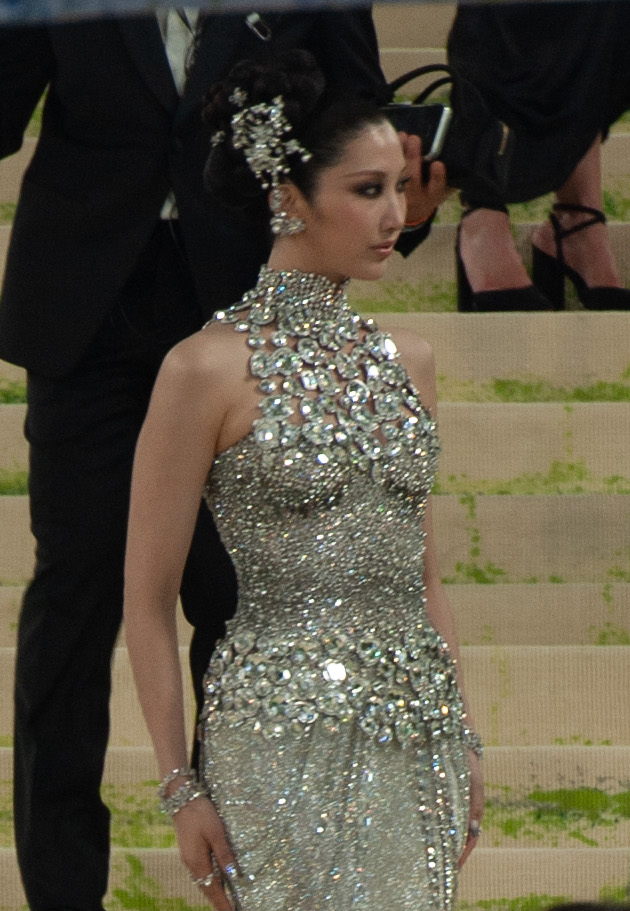
Kim at the 2026 Met Gala

On October 4, 2025, Ejae announced her debut solo single, "In Another World," which was released on October 24. On the night of October 4, she along with her fellow KPop Demon Hunters cast-mates Audrey Nuna and Rei Ami made a cameo appearance on the season 51 premiere of Saturday Night Live in a sketch based on the film, reprising their respective roles as Rumi, Mira and Zoey. On October 7, they together performed "Golden" live in full for the first time on The Tonight Show Starring Jimmy Fallon. On October 22, Ejae signed with WME. She then featured on the single "Out of My Body" from the upcoming deluxe edition of Anyma's third studio album The End of Genesys, which was released on December 19. On December 25, she and the other voices of Huntrix performed "12 Days of Christmas" at the Snoop Dogg 2025 NFL Halftime Show. On February 6, 2026, she released her second single "Time After Time." On April 10, 2026, she and the other voices of Huntrix appeared during Katseye's Coachella 2026 performance as surprise guests and performed "Golden" alongside Katseye. On June 10, 2026, the song "DNA (More Than a Game)", the official anthem of the 2026 FIFA World Cup, was released, which included Andrea Bocelli, Megan Thee Stallion and David Guetta alongside Ejae. Ejae, along with Bocelli, performed the song at the opening ceremony in Mexico City on June 11.

== Personal life ==
Ejae is currently based in Brooklyn.

Ejae became engaged to Sam Kim, a former music producer, in late 2023. They originally met in 2017 during a songwriting session. They married in October 2026. Her grandfather, Shin Young-kyun, is an actor and arts patron.

== Discography ==
=== Singles ===
==== As lead artist ====
Title	Year	Peak chart positions										Album
Title	Year	US D/E	US Dig.	AUT	GER	KOR	NZ Hot	SWE	SWI	UK Sales	WW Excl. US	Album
"In Another World"	2025	—	12	—	—	— (Note: "In Another World" did not enter the Circle Digital Chart but peaked at number 47 on the component Download Chart.)	34	—	—	62	—	Non-album singles
"Time After Time"	2026	—	—	—	—	— (Note: "Time After Time" did not enter the Circle Digital Chart but peaked at number 163 on the component Download Chart.)	—	—	—	—	—	Non-album singles
"DNA (More Than a Game)" (with Andrea Bocelli, David Guetta, and Megan Thee Stallion)	2026	9	17	64	71	195	12	68	53	18	138	Official FIFA World Cup 2026 Album (Opening Ceremony Edition)
"—" denotes releases that did not chart or were not released in that region.

==== As featured artist ====
List of singles as featured artist, with year, album and chart positions
Title	Year	Peak chart positions							Album
Title	Year	BLR Air.	CIS Air.	KAZ Air.	LAT Air.	MDA Air.	RUS Air.	UKR Air.	Album
"Out of My Body" (Anyma featuring Ejae)	2025	97	24	13	89	38	21	31	The End of Genesys (Deluxe)
"Made My Night" (Le Sserafim featuring Ejae)	2026	—	—	—	—	—	—	—	Made My Night
"—" denotes releases that did not chart or were not released in that region.

=== Soundtrack appearances ===
List of soundtrack appearances, with selected chart positions and album name
Title	Year	Peak chart positions										Certifications	Album
Title	Year	US	AUS	CAN	KOR	MLY	NZ	PHL Hot	SGP	UK	WW	Certifications	Album
"Whisper in the Dark" (사랑을 속삭여) (with Joo Hee)	2016	—	—	—	— (Note: "Whisper in the Dark" did not enter the Circle Digital Chart but peaked at number 56 on the component BGM Chart.)	—	—	—	—	—	—		Monster OST
"Take It Slow"	2019	—	—	—	— (Note: "Take It Slow" did not enter the Circle Digital Chart but peaked at number 55 on the component BGM Chart.)	—	—	—	—	—	—		Woman of 9.9 Billion OST
"Midnight Cinderella"	2020	—	—	—	— (Note: "Midnight Cinderella" did not enter the Circle Digital Chart but peaked at number 107 on the component BGM Chart.)	—	—	—	—	—	—		Dinner Mate OST
"Once Again"	2021	—	—	—	—	—	—	—	—	—	—		Genesis OST
"How It's Done" (with Audrey Nuna and Rei Ami as Huntrix)	2025	8	9	9	10	9	8	12	9	9	5	RIAA: Platinum; ARIA: 2× Platinum; BPI: Platinum; RMNZ: Platinum	KPop Demon Hunters OST
"Golden" (with Audrey Nuna and Rei Ami as Huntrix)	2025	1	1	1	1	1	1	2	1	1	1	RIAA: 5× Platinum; ARIA: 5× Platinum; BPI: 3× Platinum; KMCA: Platinum; MC: 8× Platinum; RMNZ: 5× Platinum	KPop Demon Hunters OST
"Takedown" (with Audrey Nuna and Rei Ami as Huntrix)	2025	21	17	25	37	18	18	24	13	67	11	ARIA: Platinum; BPI: Platinum; MC: 2× Platinum; RMNZ: Platinum	KPop Demon Hunters OST
"Free" (as Rumi, with Andrew Choi as Jinu)	2025	23	13	21	26	6	9	10	7	— (Note: "Free" did not enter the Official Singles Chart, but peaked at number 21 on the Official Singles Sales and number 24 on the Streaming chart.)	11	ARIA: Platinum; BPI: Gold; MC: 2× Platinum; RMNZ: Platinum	KPop Demon Hunters OST
"What It Sounds Like" (with Audrey Nuna and Rei Ami as Huntrix)	2025	15	13	15	44	7	10	17	8	13	7	RIAA: Platinum; ARIA: 2× Platinum; BPI: Platinum; MC: 2× Platinum; RMNZ: Platinum	KPop Demon Hunters OST
"Prologue (Hunter's Mantra)" (with Marcelo Zarvos)	2025	—	—	—	— (Note: "Prologue (Hunter's Mantra)" did not enter the Circle Digital Chart but peaked at number 112 on the component Download Chart.)	—	— (Note: "Prologue (Hunter's Mantra)" did not enter the Official Top 40 Singles Chart, but peaked at number 27 on the Hot 40 Singles Chart.)	—	—	—	—		KPop Demon Hunters OST (Deluxe)
"—" denotes releases that did not chart or were not released in that region.

=== Production and songwriting credits ===
All song credits are adapted from the Korea Music Copyright Association (KOMCA) and American Society of Composers, Authors and Publishers (ASCAP) databases, unless otherwise noted.

indicates a [b] background vocal contribution.
indicates a [c] credited vocal/featured artist contribution.

Year	Artist	Album	Song	Co-produced / written with	Ref
2016	EXID	Street	"Hello" (Hani solo)	Monster Factory, Made By, Park Yeong-hyeon	
2017	EXID	Eclipse	"Woo Yoo [Hani solo]"	Monster Factory, MadeBy	
2017	Byul	Leaves	"Leaves"	Byul, Samuel Park, Kim Yeon-seo, Kim Min-ji, Andrew Choi	
2018	Suzy	Faces of Love	[b] "SObeR"	Andrew Choi, Aaron Kim, Isaac Han	
2018	Babylon	CAELO	"Karma"	Ming Ji-syeon, Bae Sunghyun, Kim Jin, Jeong Da-un, JQ, THE QUIETT, Sendo, Park Ji-ho	
2018	Dominique	Non-album single	"Receipts"	Dominique, MDA	
2018	Seo In-young	Non-album single	"Always"	Monster Factory, JION	
2019	Nana Mellie	Non-album single	"Goodbye"	Nana Mellie, Isaac Han, Aaron Kim	
2019	Discrete	Non-album single	"Trippin' Bout You"	Ellen Berg, Dennis DeKo Kordnejad, Discrete	
2019	Red Velvet	The ReVe Festival: Finale	[b] "Psycho"	Andrew "Druski" Scott, Cazzi Opeia	
2019	Ejae	Woman of 9.9 Billion	[c] "Take it Slow"	Sammy Hakim, Stephen Wolf	
2020	EUN	Dinner Mate Original Soundtrack	[c] "Midnight Cinderella"	Andrew Choi, Ming Ji-syeon	
2020	Taeyeon	#GirlsSpkOut	"Sorrow"	Sakurai Sara, Ming Ji-syeon	
2020	Raymond J. Lee	Kipo and the Age of Wonderbeasts (Season 3 Mixtape)	"Ocean of Love"	Matthew Wang, Daniel Rojas	
2021	Chung Ha	Street Woman Fighter Special	"Bad Girl" (with Lachica)	Czaer	
2021	Twice	Perfect World	"Pieces of Love"	Isaac Han, Albin Nordqvist, Walter Pok, Aaron Kim	
2021	Mobile Legends: Bang Bang	Non-album single	[c] "Together"	Stanley Robinson, Gabe Reali, David Westbom	
2021	Kim Na-young	Me	"Killing Me Softly"	Aaron Kim, Isaac Han, AND	
2021	Twice	Formula of Love: O+T=＜3	[b] "Last Waltz"	Lee Hae-sol, Sim Eun-jee	
2021	League of Legends	Non-album single	[c] "Rebirth"	Matthew Carl Earl	
2022	Nada	Non-album single	"Bulletproof"	Nada, Bae Seong-hyeon, Jeong Se-hee, Lee Seul, Yeon Yu-jin, MSB, Brian U, Markalong, Charlotte Louise Jaye Wilson	
2022	Nmixx	Ad Mare	[b] "O.O"	The Hub: Brian U, Enan, MarkAlong, Charlotte Wilson, Chanti, Awry, Ayushy, Jan Baars, Rajan Muse	
2022	Hyo	Deep	[b] "Stupid"	Carlyle Fernandes, Chikk, Heber Nathaniel Martinez	
2022	Lightsum	Into the Light	"Good News"	Galactika: Atenna & Star Wars, Kim Hyun-joong	
2022	Kard	Re:	"Break Down"	BM, Isaac Han, Aaron Kim, J.seph, Somin, Jiwoo, Ghostchild	
2022	Twice	Celebrate	"Flow Like Waves"	Anna Timgren, Aaron Kim	
2022	Nmixx	Entwurf	"Dice"	Armadillo, Rangga, Frankie Day (The Hub), Charlotte Wilson (The Hub), The Hub 88, Jonkind, Dr. Jo (153/Joombas), Charin (153/Joombas), Zaya (153/Joombas), Park Ji-hyun (153/Joombas), Myung Hye-in (Jam Factory), Baek Sae-im (Jam Factory), Danke (Lalala Studio)	
2022	Red Velvet	The ReVe Festival 2022 – Birthday	[b] "Birthday"	Kole, Isaac Han, Aaron Kim, Ghostchild Ltd, Loosen Door	
2023	Billlie	The Billage of Perception: Chapter Three	"nevertheless"	GALACTIKA	
2023	Kard	Icky	"Icky"	J.seph, HAHM, BM	
2023	MiSaMo	Masterpiece	"Funny Valentine"	Momo, Yuka Matsumoto, Realmeee, Scott Bruzenak	
2023	Lightsum	Honey or Spice	"Not My Style"	Lee Hae-sol, Kyndyl Miller	
2023	Aespa	Drama	[b] "Drama"	No Identity, Waker (153/Joombas), Charlotte Wilson	
2024	Lim Kim	Non-album single	"Ult"	No Identity	
2024	Kep1er	Kep1going	"Daisy"	Kole, Isaac Han, Aaron Kim, Ghostchild Ltd, Ashe Ahn	
2024	Madalen Duke, Kayla Diamond	Non-album single	"Bones"	Madalen Duke, Kayla Diamond, Sophie Curtis	
2024	Fifty Fifty	Love Tune	"Starry Night"	Kole, Alawn	
2024	Aespa	Armageddon	"Armageddon"	No Identity, Sumin	
2024	Aespa	Whiplash	"Kill It"	Imlay, Kirsten Collins, Waker (153/Joombas)	
2024	MiSaMo	Haute Couture	"Baby, I'm Good"	Aaron Kim	
2024	Irene	Like a Flower	"Like a Flower"	Barney Cox, Joey Eighty, JC. Don, Elena Hoey	
2025	Le Sserafim	Hot	[b] "So Cynical (Badum)"	Vitals, Anthony Watts, Huh Yunjin, "Hitman" Bang, Hong Eun-chae, Kim Chaewon	
2025	Ejae, Audrey Nuna and Rei Ami (as Huntrix)	KPop Demon Hunters (Soundtrack from the Netflix Film)	[c] "How It's Done"	Daniel Rojas, Danny Chung, Mark Sonnenblick, 24, IDO, TEDDY	
2025	Ejae, Audrey Nuna and Rei Ami (as Huntrix)	KPop Demon Hunters (Soundtrack from the Netflix Film)	[c] "Golden"	Mark Sonnenblick, 24, IDO, TEDDY	
2025	Andrew Choi, Neckwav, Danny Chung, Kevin Woo, and samUIL Lee (as the Saja Boys)	KPop Demon Hunters (Soundtrack from the Netflix Film)	"Your Idol"	Mark Sonnenblick, Vince, KUSH, 24, IDO	
2025	Ejae, Audrey Nuna and Rei Ami (as Huntrix)	KPop Demon Hunters (Soundtrack from the Netflix Film)	[c] "What It Sounds Like"	Jenna Andrews, Stephen Kirk, Mark Sonnenblick, 24, IDO, TEDDY, Daniel Rojas	
2025	Ejae	KPop Demon Hunters (Soundtrack from the Netflix Film)	[c] "Prologue (Hunter's Mantra)"	Marcelo Zarvos, Mark Sonnenblick, Daniel Rojas	
2025	TDYA	Non-album single	"Keep the Light"	SOFTSERVEBOY, Ayushy, JSONG, Mirani, Joy Kim, Lee Jae Ni, Amy Y, LILA, Shico	
2025	Nmixx	Blue Valentine	"O.O Part 2 (Superhero)"	Brian U (The Hub), MarkAlong, Charlotte Wilson	
2025	Twice	Ten: The Story Goes On	"ATM" (Jihyo solo)	JT Roach, Timothy "Bos" Bullock, Mikhail Miller	
2025	Ejae	Non-album single	[c] "In Another World"	Breagh Isabel, Ted Andreville, Vitals, Daniel Rojas	
2026	Ejae	Non-album single	[c] "Time After Time"	Rollo, Vaughn Oliver, Drew Scott	
2026	Blackpink	Deadline	[b] "Champion"	Lukasz Gottwald, Theron Thomas	
2026	I-D, Jason Richardson, and R.E.D	Dungeon Fighter Online	"Pick Your Poison"	Alex KARLSON, T-MA, JONO, Nathan ROMERO	
2026	Ejae, Andrea Bocelli, David Guetta, and Megan Thee Stallion	Official FIFA World Cup 2026 Album	[c] "DNA (More Than a Game)"	Andrea Bocelli, David Guetta, Megan Pete, Giovanni Damiani, Giorgio Tuinfort, Felix Hain, Lucas Hain, Bobby Session Jr., Ashley Milton, Daniel Goudie, Francesco Pasquero, Norma Jean Martine	
2026	Le Sserafim and Ejae	Made My Night	[c] "Made My Night" (Remix)	Riley McDonough, Connor McDonough, Ryan Daly, Castle, Mae Muller, Justin Tranter, Brandon Colbein	

== Filmography ==
Year	Title	Role	Notes	Ref.
2025	KPop Demon Hunters	Rumi (singing voice)	Netflix original film	
2025	K-Pop Familjen	Herself	Swedish documentary; Ejae as topliner at KMR Songcamp 2024	
2025	Saturday Night Live	Herself (Note: with Audrey Nuna and Rei Ami as Huntrix)	Season 51, episode 1 Cameo	
2025	99th Macy's Thanksgiving Day Parade	Herself	Live performance	
2025	Dick Clark's New Year's Rockin' Eve	Herself	Live performance	

== Accolades ==
=== Awards and nominations ===
Name of the award ceremony, year presented, category, nominee of the award, and the result of the nomination
Award ceremony	Year	Category	Nominee / Work	Result	Ref.
Academy Awards	2026	Best Original Song	"Golden" (Note: with Mark Sonnenblick, 24, IDO, Teddy)	Won	
Advanced Imaging Society Lumiere Awards	2026	Best Original Song	"Golden"	Won	
Advanced Imaging Society Lumiere Awards	2026	Best Musical Scene or Sequence	"Golden"	Won	
American Cinematheque	2026	Tribute to the Crafts Feature Film Song	"Golden"	Honored	
American Music Awards	2026	Song of the Year	"Golden"	Won	
American Music Awards	2026	Best Pop Song	"Golden"	Won	
American Music Awards	2026	Best Vocal Performance	"Golden"	Won	
Annie Awards	2025	Outstanding Achievement for Music in a Feature Production	KPop Demon Hunters (Note: with KPop Demon Hunters Music Team.)	Won	
ASCAP Pop Music Awards	2026	Songwriter Award	Ejae – "Golden"	Honored	
ASCAP Women Behind the Music	2025	Trailblazing Women	Ejae	Honored	
Asia Artist Awards	2025	Best OST	"Golden"	Won	
Astra Film Awards	2026	Best Original Song	"Golden"	Won	
Austin Film Critics Association	2025	Best Voice Acting/Animated/Digital Performance	KPop Demon Hunters (Note: with Arden Cho)	Nominated	
Billboard Women in Music	2026	Billboard Women of the Year	Huntrix	Honored	
Brit Awards	2026	International Group of the Year	Huntrix	Nominated	
Brit Awards	2026	International Song of the Year	"Golden"	Nominated	
Capri Hollywood International Film Festival	2026	Best Original Song	"Golden" (Note: with Mark Sonnenblick)	Won	
Chicago Indie Critics	2026	Best Original Song	"Golden"	Nominated	
Critics Association of Central Florida	2026	Best Original Song	"Golden"	Won	
Critics' Choice Movie Awards	2026	Best Song	"Golden"	Won	
Denver Film Critics Society	2026	Best Song	"Golden"	Won	
DiscussingFilm's Global Film Critics Awards	2026	Best Original Song	"Golden"	Won	
Dorian Award	2026	Film Music of the Year	KPop Demon Hunters	Nominated	
Georgia Film Critics Association	2026	Best Original Song	"Golden"	Runner-up	
Gold Derby Film Awards	2026	Best Original Song	"Golden"	Won	
Golden Globe Awards	2026	Best Original Song	"Golden"	Won	
Grammy Awards	2026	Song of the Year	"Golden"	Nominated	
Grammy Awards	2026	Best Song Written for Visual Media	"Golden"	Won	
Grammy Awards	2026	Best Pop Duo/Group Performance	"Golden"	Nominated	
Hollywood Music in Media Awards	2022	Best Original Song in a Video Game	"Rebirth" (Note: with Matthew Carl Earl)	Nominated	
Hollywood Music in Media Awards	2025	Original Song – Animated Film	"Golden"	Won	
Hollywood Music in Media Awards	2025	Song – Onscreen Performance (Film)	"Golden"	Nominated	
Houston Film Critics Society	2025	Best Original Song	"Golden"	Won	
iHeartRadio Music Awards	2026	Duo/Group of the Year	Huntrix	Won	
iHeartRadio Music Awards	2026	Pop Song of the Year	"Golden"	Nominated	
iHeartRadio Music Awards	2026	K-pop Song of the Year	"Golden"	Won	
iHeartRadio Music Awards	2026	Best Lyrics	"Golden"	Nominated	
IndieWire Honors	2025	Spark Award	Ejae (Note: with Maggie Kang and Chris Appelhans)	Honored	
Japan Gold Disc Award	2026	Song of the Year by Download (Asia)	"Golden"	Won	
Japan Gold Disc Award	2026	Song of the Year by Streaming (Asia)	"Golden"	Won	
K-World Dream Awards	2025	Best OST	"Golden"	Won	
Korea First Brand Awards	2026	Hot Icon (Female)	Huntrix	Won	
Korea Grand Music Awards	2025	Best Virtual Artist	"Golden"	Nominated	
Korean American Community Foundation	2026	Trailblazer Award	Huntrix	Honored	
Korean American Non-Profit Gyopo	2026	8th Annual Chuseok Benefit Honoree	Ejae	Honored	
Las Vegas Film Critics Society	2025	Best Song	"Golden"	Nominated	
Latino Entertainment Journalists Association	2026	Best Song	"Golden"	Won	
Los 40 Music Awards	2025	Best International New Artist	Huntrix	Won	
MAMA Awards	2025	Song of the Year	"Golden"	Nominated	
MAMA Awards	2025	Best OST	"Golden"	Won	
Melon Music Awards	2025	Song of the Year	"Golden"	Nominated	
Melon Music Awards	2025	Best OST	"Golden"	Won	
MTV Video Music Awards	2025	Song of Summer	"Golden"	Nominated	
MTV Video Music Awards	2026	Song of the year	"Golden"	Nominated	
Music Awards Japan	2026	Best Song Asia	"Golden"	Won	
Music Awards Japan	2026	Best International Pop Song in Japan	"Golden"	Nominated	
Music Awards Japan	2026	International Song powered by Spotify	"Golden"	Nominated	
Music City Film Critics Association	2026	Best Original Song	"Golden"	Nominated	
New Jersey Film Critics Circle	2025	Best Original Song	"Golden"	Won	
New Mexico Film Critics Association Awards	2025	Best Original Song	"Golden"	Runner-up	
Nickelodeon Kids' Choice Awards	2026	Favorite Song from a Movie	"Golden"	Won	
NMPA & Billboard Grammy Week Songwriter Awards	2026	Breakthrough Songwriter	Ejae	Honored	
North Carolina Film Critics Association	2026	Best Original Song	"Golden"	Won	
North Carolina Film Critics Association	2026	Best Original Song	"What It Sounds Like" (Note: with Daniel Rojas, Mark Sonnenblick, Teddy, 24, IDO)	Nominated	
North Dakota Film Society	2026	Best Original Song	"Golden"	Won	
The Online Film & Television Association	2026	Best Original Song	"Golden"	Runner-up	
Pittsburgh Film Critics Association	2026	Best Song	"Golden"	Runner-up	
Puerto Rico Critics Association	2026	Best Original Song	"Golden"	Won	
Santa Barbara International Film Festival	2026	Variety Artisans Award	Ejae	Won	
Satellite Awards	2026	Best Original Song	"Golden"	Nominated	
SCAD Savannah Film Festival	2025	Variety's 10 Artisans to Watch	Ejae	Honored	
SEC Awards	2026	International Song of the Year	"Golden"	Nominated	
Society of Composers & Lyricists Awards	2026	Outstanding Original Song for a Comedy or Musical Visual Media Production	"Golden"	Won	
Songwriters of North America	2026	Global Impact Award	KPop Demon Hunters (Note: with KPop Demon Hunters Songwriting team)	Honored	
TikTok title holders	2025	Songwriter of the Year	Ejae	Honored	
Variety Hitmakers Awards	2025	Variety's Hitmakers	Ejae	Honored	
World Soundtrack Awards	2026	Best Original Song	"Golden"	Won	

== Other accolades ==
=== State and cultural honours ===
Name of country or organization, award ceremony, year given, and name of honor
Country or organization	Award ceremony	Year	Honor	Ref.
South Korea	Korean Popular Culture and Arts Awards	2026	Prime Minister's Commendation	

=== Listicles ===
Name of publisher, year listed, name of listicle, and placement
Publisher	Year	Listicle	Placement	Ref.
Billboard Korea	2025	K-Pop Artist 100	55th	
Forbes	2025	100 Most Powerful Women (Note: with the female creators and cast of KPop Demon Hunters)	100th	
Gold House	2026	Gold100 List (Note: with Maggie Kang, Michelle Wong, Arden Cho, May Hong, Ji-young Yoo, Audrey Nuna, Rei Ami) (Note: with Audrey Nuna, Rei Ami, Teddy Park, IDO, 24)	Included	
Luminate	2025	Most Streamed K-Pop Artist in US	1st	
Luminate	2025	Most Streamed K-Pop Artist in US	2nd	
