= In Another World (Ejae song) =

Single by Ejae
- Released: October 24, 2025
- Genre: Pop
- Length: 2:55
- Label: Lunamu; Imperial
- Songwriters: Ejae; Breagh Isabel; Ted Andreville
- Producers: Daniel Rojas; Breagh Isabel; Vitals

Ejae singles chronology
"Golden" (2025)	"In Another World" (2025)	"How It's Done" (2026)

Music video
- "In Another World" on YouTube

"In Another World" is the debut solo single by South Korean and American singer-songwriter Ejae. The song was released on October 24, 2025, after she teased it on Instagram and one day after music video was released on Ejae's YouTube channel. It was her first solo release since her role as the singing voice of Rumi in KPop Demon Hunters, and was released through Lunamu and Imperial.

Ejae said she wrote the song two years earlier at a songwriting camp in Canada. The song emerged from a rough time in her relationship with her fiancé; in the song, she reflects on how the relationship would've gone under different circumstances. She told Variety that the lyrics "helped me accept reality in a way, but at the same time, be OK with it by knowing to just be real with yourself. I chose this song because it felt exactly how I felt with Rumi and the movie. Accepting your demons, then accepting that part of yourself — that is when true growth happens."

== Charts ==
Chart performance for "In Another World"
Chart (2025)	Peak position
New Zealand Hot Singles (RMNZ)	34
South Korea BGM (Circle)	15
South Korea Download (Circle)	47
UK Singles Sales (OCC)	62
US Digital Song Sales (Billboard)	12
