= Golden (Huntrix song) =

Single by Huntrix

from the album KPop Demon Hunters
- Language: English; Korean
- Released: July 4, 2025
- Genre: K-pop; electropop
- Length: 3:14
- Label: Republic; Visva
- Songwriters: Kim Eun-jae; Mark Sonnenblick; Joong Gyu Kwak; Yu Han Lee; Hee Dong Nam; Jeong Hoon Seo; Teddy Park
- Producers: 24; Ido; Teddy; Ian Eisendrath

KPop Demon Hunters singles chronology
"Takedown" (2025)	"Golden" (2025)	"How It's Done" (2026)

Ejae singles chronology
"Golden" (2025)	"In Another World" (2025)

Lyric video
- "Golden" on YouTube

"Golden" is a song performed by Ejae, Audrey Nuna, and Rei Ami as the fictional K-pop girl group Huntrix in the 2025 animated musical urban fantasy film KPop Demon Hunters. It was released on July 4, 2025, through Republic Records, as the second single from the film's soundtrack album.

Critically acclaimed and an immediate hit, the song reached number one on the Billboard Global 200 and topped the charts in more than 30 countries, including South Korea, the United Kingdom, and the United States. It reached the top ten of charts in more than 20 other countries, and was certified 2x Platinum or higher in eight countries.

Ejae, Nuna, and Ami promoted "Golden" with performances on The Tonight Show Starring Jimmy Fallon, Jimmy Kimmel Live!, and at Macy's Thanksgiving Parade in New York. The song received several accolades, including the Critics' Choice Award, Golden Globe Award, and Academy Award for Best Original Song. At the 68th Grammy Awards, the song received four nominations (including Song of the Year) and won Best Song Written for Visual Media; it was the first K-pop song to win a Grammy Award and the first to win an Academy Award.

== Background and release ==
The animated musical fantasy film KPop Demon Hunters was released on Netflix on June 20, 2025. The film follows the fictional K-pop girl group Huntrix, consisting of Rumi, Mira, and Zoey, whose singing voices are performed by Ejae, Audrey Nuna, and Rei Ami, respectively. The film's soundtrack album was released on the same day, with "Golden" as the fourth track.

Republic Records released "Golden" as a single on July 4, 2025, along with instrumental and a cappella versions, and announced that the song would be submitted for awards consideration. Billboard noted that "following the soundtrack's second-week streaming explosion, Republic hustled to have 'Golden' impact top 40 radio stations" on July 8. Republic Records Chairman Jim Roppo said that they were also in discussions on "potential remixes of" the song "with some 'A-list remixers' in play". A remix of "Golden" by David Guetta was released on July 25.

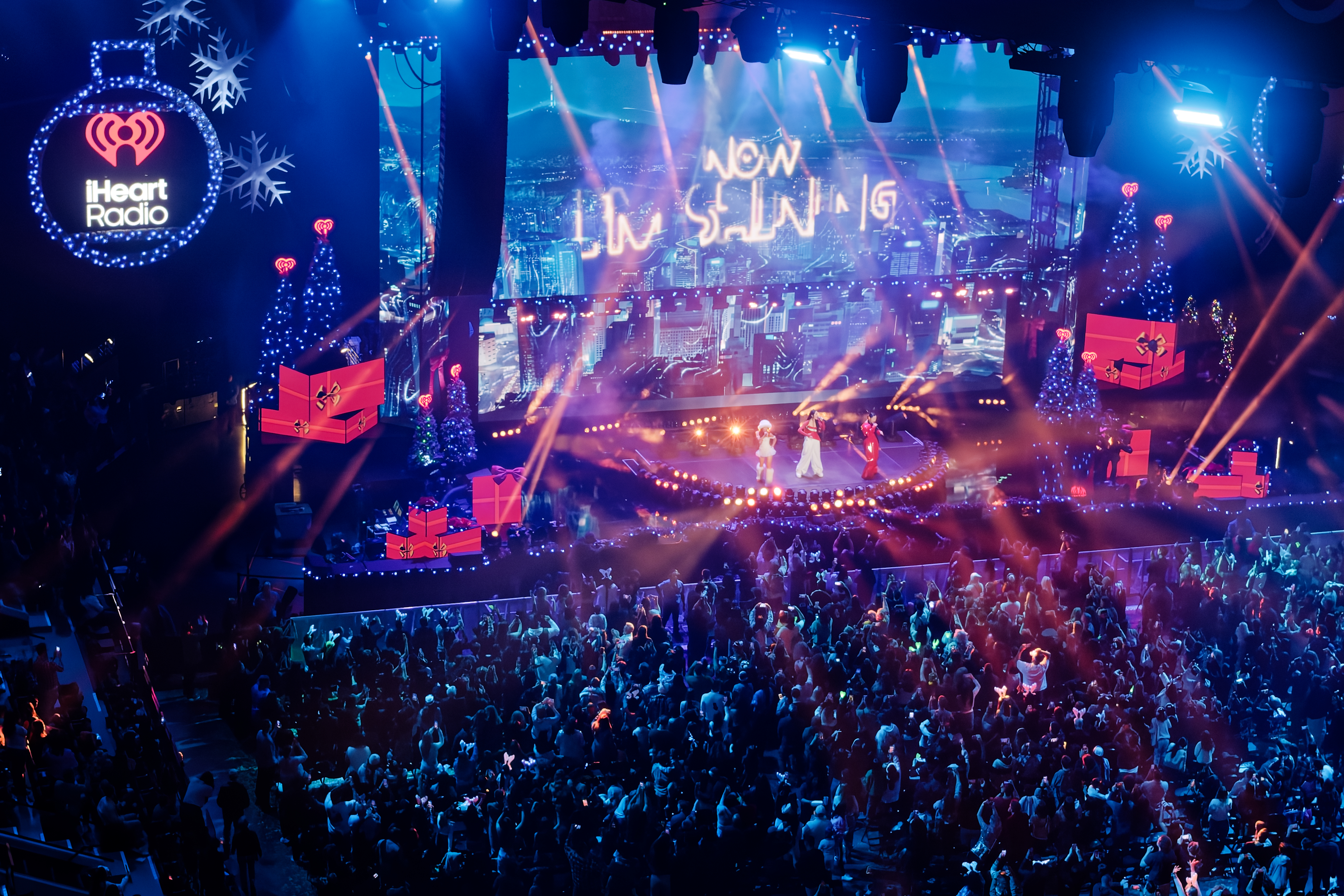
From left to right, the Huntrix singers Rei Ami, Ejae, and Audrey Nuna performing "Golden" at the 2025 KIIS-FM Jingle Ball

"Golden" was performed live in full for the first time by Ejae, Nuna, and Rei Ami on The Tonight Show Starring Jimmy Fallon on October 7, 2025. A few days earlier, on October 4, an abbreviated version was performed live for the first time on the Saturday Night Live season 51 premiere as part of a sketch in which host Bad Bunny's character expressed his love for the movie. On January 8, 2026, Ejae, Nuna, and Rei Ami performed on Jimmy Kimmel Live! with the debut of a new symphonic version of "Golden". This version, "Golden (Glowin' Version)", was released the following day. In January 2026, it was announced that "Golden" would be one of two live musical performances at the 98th Academy Awards (March 2026), following its nomination for the Academy Award for Best Original Song. In January 2026, the song’s official lyric video achieved 1 billion views on YouTube.

== Lyrics and composition ==
Within the narrative of KPop Demon Hunters, "Golden" is the latest musical release by Huntrix, intended to bring about the "Golden Honmoon", a permanent magical barrier against the demons that Huntrix fight. As the song plays in the film, the audience learns that Rumi is secretly half-demon. Ian Eisendrath, executive producer for the soundtrack album, described "Golden" as an "I Want" song that explores the characters' purpose while also dwelling on Rumi's inner thoughts during the song's bridge, which shifts from "inspirational pop" to a slightly darker "sotto voce". The Chosun Daily wrote that "while over 90% of the lyrics are in English, key moments feature Korean words such as 'eoduwajin' ('darkened') and 'yeongwonhi ggaejil su eomneun' ('unbreakable forever'), preserving its K-pop identity".

Eisendrath said that they initially "had five to six songs written for that slot" but kept developing "until it was the right energy. The directors are tough customers, in the best possible way, and they had a real vision for what this needed to be". The song had the working title "Gold" during production. According to Danny Chung, who worked and performed on the film's soundtrack, "Golden" was "the last [song] to be really locked in". It went "through a few iterations of production, meaning the instrumental changed a few times before it landed where it would be." The song was co-written by Ejae and Mark Sonnenblick "under the guidance" of Eisendrath.

The song is performed in G major, covering a three-octave range up to a high A at A5. Music critic Lim Hee-yoon's wrote that "the powerful high note reaching up to a high A in the third octave is rarely used in idol songs", adding "freshness". Ars Technica wrote that the song's three-octave range was "impressive", saying A5 was "usually reserved for classically trained operatic sopranos". Ejae told Korea JoongAng Daily that she "intentionally wrote a challenging vocal line" to "reflect both Rumi's vocal prowess and her fierce determination to seal the magical barrier of [the] Honmoon", and said that she "just followed where the melody took me, and suddenly I was hitting an A5 note". Co-director Maggie Kang said that they "had Ejae sing the highest notes that she could possibly sing in a lot of the songs," including "Golden". The Washington Post wrote that "it was important to Kang that the song embody 'the feeling that you get when you hear an artist, like, just put all of her talent and effort and that physical struggle into hitting a note'".

Co-director Chris Appelhans said the "I Want" song followed "the conventions of a traditional musical" while also "making it a legitimately great pop song" which "is probably why it's [in the Top 10] on the worldwide Spotify charts", adding that "a good pop song also tells a story" which is what "Golden" is doing. In a Reddit "Ask Me Anything" interview, Appelhans said "Golden" was inspired by songs such as Biggie's "Juicy" and "Forever" by Drake, Kanye West, Lil Wayne, and Eminem that helped the writers "understand how a pop song could be a biography about starting as a nobody and finding yourself".

== Critical reception ==
The song received critical acclaim. Debashree Dutta of Rolling Stone India called the song "an infectious electropop track", noting how it focuses on the purpose of the characters "while also reflecting Rumi's thoughts and the complexity of their role. Thematically, 'Golden' portrays their growth as guardians of humanity". Similarly, Angela Garcia of SLUG Magazine noted the song, along with "Your Idol", as energetic tracks with "infectious melodies". Sarah Carey of That Hashtag Show described it as a passionately emotional song that listeners "play when [they] need to remind [themselves] who [they] are." Anne Branigin of The Washington Post commented that its "popularity can be measured not just in its streaming numbers but also in the scores of covers (dance, vocal and instrumental) and passionate lip-synching videos that it has inspired on TikTok and Instagram", noting that "even real-life K-pop idols are fans, sharing their own interpretations of the dances and songs". Branigin also highlighted that the song has accomplished "a rare feat for a K-pop song" by "even being played on American radio"; during August 1–7, its radio airplay audience impressions "surged more than 70 percent".

In a Billboard discussion on the success of "Golden" compared to other songs on the soundtrack, Jason Lipshutz felt that the song's trajectory as the "standout hit from the soundtrack" was "understandable", since it is the "unifying anthem for [Huntrix] with soaring melodies and chest-thumping inspiration". Lipshutz further explained that it "has become a single-song representation of the KPop Demon Hunters phenomenon, as a highly positive, musically undeniable piece of pop songwriting; it was designed as a smash in the fictional world of the movie, but was strong enough to become one in the real world, too". Abby Webster commented that as the film's "I Want" song, "Golden" is the clear "centerpiece of the soundtrack, but it also does a great job threading the needle between pop and narrative songwriting". She stated that the song is "a really emotionally satisfying song" regardless of having seeing the associated film, though it is "heightened if you have".

Chris Molanphy of Slate called the song "well-crafted inspirational pop" and felt that while "soaring" was a "cliché" description, "soaring is quite literally what 'Golden' is about, in its musical structure as well as in the lyrics of its chorus". Molanphy also described "Golden" as "an American Idol coronation song or a Disney 'I want ...' song run through the K-pop machine, an empowerment anthem tailored for fans to relate to it both individually and parasocially—a big theme running through [KPop Demon Hunters], the movie, wherein pop stars' fans are their most precious asset". He opined that "Golden" and the rest of the film's soundtrack saved us "from the summer of our discontent" by injecting a pop surprise into an otherwise stagnant 2025 musical landscape "clogged with aging holdovers from 2024" and the chart reign of "Alex Warren's snoozy, churchy ballad 'Ordinary'". Mackenzie Schmidt of People similarly commented that "Golden" has been "ticking every box required of a 'song of the summer'", noting the song "sparks that rare giddy, new music feeling, where you know you're going to put it on repeat and the first notes in your headphones are an instant hit of serotonin". Schmidt also highlighted that it has "captivated a massive and incredibly diverse fandom". Aimee Hart of Polygon commented that compared to the original version, the "Glowin' Version" is "a much softer, melodic performance, and the harmonies shared between Ejae, Nuna, and Ami feel far more distinct and almost ethereal".

=== Accolades ===
Awards and nominations for "Golden"
Year	Award	Category	Result	Refs.
2025	K-World Dream Awards	Best OST	Won	
2025	MTV Video Music Awards	Song of Summer	Nominated	
2025	Korea Grand Music Awards	Best Virtual Artist	Nominated	
2025	MAMA Awards	Best OST	Won	
2025	MAMA Awards	Song of the Year	Nominated	
2025	NRJ Music Awards	Social Hit (David Guetta Remix)	Won	
2025	Hollywood Music in Media Awards	Song – Animated Film	Won	
2025	Hollywood Music in Media Awards	Song – Onscreen Performance (Film)	Nominated	
2025	Asia Artist Awards	Best OST	Won	
2025	Melon Music Awards	Song of the Year	Nominated	
2025	Melon Music Awards	Best OST	Won	
2025	Las Vegas Film Critics Society	Best Song	Nominated	
2025	Georgia Film Critics Association	Best Original Song	Runner-up	
2025	New Jersey Film Critics Circle	Best Original Song	Won	
2025	New Mexico Film Critics Association Awards	Best Original Song	Runner-up	
2025	RTHK International Pop Poll Awards	Top Ten International Gold Songs (David Guetta Remix)	Won	
2026	Academy Awards	Best Original Song	Won	
2026	Advanced Imaging Society Lumiere Awards	Best Original Song	Won	
2026	Advanced Imaging Society Lumiere Awards	Best Musical Scene or Sequence	Won	
2026	American Cinematheque	Tribute to the Crafts Feature Film Song	Honored	
2026	American Music Awards	Song of the Year	Won	
2026	American Music Awards	Best Pop Song	Won	
2026	American Music Awards	Best Vocal Performance	Won	
2026	ASCAP Pop Music Awards	Songwriter Award	Honored	
2026	Astra Film Awards	Best Original Song	Won	
2026	Brit Awards	International Song of the Year	Nominated	
2026	Capri Hollywood International Film Festival	Best Original Song	Won	
2026	Critics Association Of Central Florida	Best Original Song	Won	
2026	Chicago Indie Critics	Best Original Song	Nominated	
2026	Critics' Choice Movie Awards	Best Song	Won	
2026	Denver Film Critics Society	Best Song	Won	
2026	DiscussingFilm's Global Film Critics Awards	Best Original Song	Won	
2026	Gold Derby Film Awards	Best Original Song	Won	
2026	Golden Globe Awards	Best Original Song – Motion Picture	Won	
2026	Grammy Awards	Song of the Year	Nominated	
2026	Grammy Awards	Best Pop Duo/Group Performance	Nominated	
2026	Grammy Awards	Best Song Written for Visual Media	Won	
2026	Grammy Awards	Best Remixed Recording (David Guetta Remix)	Nominated	
2026	Houston Film Critics Society	Best Original Song	Won	
2026	iHeartRadio Music Awards	Pop Song of the Year	Nominated	
2026	iHeartRadio Music Awards	K-pop Song of the Year	Won	
2026	iHeartRadio Music Awards	Best Lyrics	Nominated	
2026	Japan Gold Disc Award	Song of the Year by Download (Asia)	Won	
2026	Japan Gold Disc Award	Song of the Year by Streaming (Asia)	Won	
2026	Latino Entertainment Journalists Association	Best Song	Won	
2026	MTV Video Music Awards	Song of the Year	Nominated	
2026	Music Awards Japan	Best Song Asia	Won	
2026	Music Awards Japan	Best International Pop Song in Japan	Nominated	
2026	Music Awards Japan	International Song powered by Spotify	Nominated	
2026	Music City Film Critics Association	Best Original Song	Nominated	
2026	Nickelodeon Kids' Choice Awards	Favorite Song from a Movie	Won	
2026	North Carolina Film Critics Association	Best Original Song	Won	
2026	North Dakota Film Society	Best Original Song	Won	
2026	The Online Film & Television Association	Best Original Song	Runner-up	
2026	Pittsburgh Film Critics Association	Best Song	Runner-up	
2026	Puerto Rico Critics Association	Best Original Song	Won	
2026	Satellite Awards	Best Original Song	Nominated	
2026	SEC Awards	International Song of the Year	Nominated	
2026	Society of Composers & Lyricists Awards	Outstanding Original Song for a Comedy or Musical Visual Media Production	Won	
2026	World Soundtrack Awards	Best Original Song	Won	

=== Listicles ===
Name of publisher, year listed, name of listicle, and placement
Publisher	Year	Listicle	Placement	Ref.
Billboard	2025	The 100 Best Songs of 2025	1st	
NME	2025	The 25 best K-pop songs of 2025	2nd	
Rolling Stone India	2025	The 25 Best K-Pop Songs of 2025	Included	
Rolling Stone Korea	2025	Song of the Year	Included	
TikTok Korea	2025	Year in Music	10th	
YouTube	2025	Top Songs	3rd	
YouTube Korea	2025	Shorts' Top Popular Songs	2nd	
YouTube Korea	2025	Most Popular Song	1st	

== Commercial performance ==
In addition to the film's successful soundtrack, "Golden" attained individual commercial success worldwide, charting on various national record charts and garnering millions of streams. The song reached number one on both the Billboard Global 200 and the Billboard Global Excl. US charts during the week of July 19, holding the top position for a total of eighteen non-consecutive weeks between July 19 – December 13.

=== North America ===
According to Billboard, "Golden" garnered seven million U.S. streams from June 27 to June 30, a 272% increase from the same period during the previous week. In the first week of July 2025, the song debuted at number 81 on the U.S. Billboard Hot 100 and number 63 on the Canadian Hot 100. Two weeks later, the song entered the top ten of both charts. The song later rose to number one in both countries. Billboard noted that this was a milestone in multiple categories, as Huntrix is the first in the U.S. to reach number one "for all-women collectives of three or more members" since Destiny's Child with "Bootylicious" in 2001, the first fictional act to reach number one since "We Don't Talk About Bruno" in 2022, and "'Golden' is the ninth song associated with Korean pop to conquer the Hot 100" as well as "the first by female lead vocalists"; Vulture highlighted that those eight other K-pop songs had either been BTS songs or solos by BTS members. In its fifth non-consecutive week at number one on the Hot 100, the song surpassed The Chipmunks' "The Chipmunk Song" and The Archies' "Sugar, Sugar" (both of which spent four weeks atop in 1958 and 1969 respectively) to become the longest-leading hit by an animated act.

On July 3, the song reached number two on the US Spotify daily chart, with the BBC highlighting how it "surpass[ed] Blackpink as the highest-charting female K-pop group". Five days later, on July 8, "Golden" topped the US Spotify daily chart, causing Huntrix to become the first female K-pop group to have a song do so. The song debuted at number 7 on the US Streaming Songs chart – "Golden" is the first song "credited to a fictional act (Huntr/x) to reach the top 10 in the Streaming Songs tally's 12-year history" and "also the first song from an animated film to reach the Streaming Songs top 10 since tracks from Encanto" (2021) were on the list.

=== Asia ===
In Asia, "Golden" peaked at number one on the International Federation of the Phonographic Industry's (IFPI) Official Malaysia Chart, and Singapore's Official Singapore Chart. In the Philippines, the song peaked at number two on Billboard Philippines' Hot 100. In South Korea, "Golden" charted at number one on the Digital Chart and debuted at number two on the weekly Global K-pop Chart, both published by Circle. The song also became the third to achieve a 2025 perfect all-kill in South Korea, and later broke the record for the most hourly perfect all-kills of all time. In Japan, the song peaked at number seven on the Japan Hot 100. According to Oricon Chart, 51,073 digital copies of the song were sold as of April 5, 2026.

=== Europe ===
In Germany, "Golden" debuted at number 27 on the GfK's Top 100 Singles chart. The following week, it entered the top ten at number nine, and later topped the chart in the week of August 8. In Austria, the song debuted at number 30 on the Ö3 Austria Top 40. It later held the runner-up spot for five consecutive weeks before then peaking at number one for seven weeks. In Switzerland, the song debuted at number 39 on the Swiss Hitparade. It later reached number two for seven consecutive weeks before dethroning Alex Warren's "Ordinary", ending its 25-week run at number one, where it remained for three weeks. In Ireland, the song peaked at number two on the Irish Singles Chart. It also appeared on the IFPI chart in Norway, reaching number one. The song additionally topped Sweden's Sverigetopplistan, the Single Top 100 in the Netherlands, and the Top 100 Songs chart in Spain.

In the United Kingdom, the song reached number one on the UK Singles Chart the week beginning August 1, becoming the second K-pop song in history to achieve this feat after Psy's "Gangnam Style", as well as the first song by a fictional band since "The Official BBC Children in Need Medley" in 2009 to reach number one. The song subsequently spent ten non-consecutive weeks atop the chart, surpassing The Archies' "Sugar, Sugar" as the longest-running number one single by a fictional act.

=== Oceania ===
In Australia, "Golden" debuted on the Australian Recording Industry Association's (ARIA) Top 50 Singles Chart at number eight. The song also debuted at number five on New Zealand's Top 40 Singles, later rising to number one in both countries.

== Cover versions ==
"Golden" has received multiple cover recordings, released via YouTube, by numerous K-pop artists, including by An Yu-jin, Bada, Lee Hae-ri, Kwon Jin-ah, Kwon Soon-il, and Jung Eun-ji. The song has also been performed live by the group Babymonster at the 2025 MAMA Awards, by Katherine Jenkins at the 2025 Royal Variety Performance with accompanying solo piano and orchestra, by Katseye at Coachella 2026 where they were joined by Ejae, Nuna, and Ami on-stage, and by Kelly Clarkson on the final episode of The Kelly Clarkson Show in 2026.

== Track listing ==
Digital download and streaming

1. "Golden" – 3:14
2. "Golden" (instrumental) – 3:12
3. "Golden" (a cappella) – 3:12

Digital download and streaming – David Guetta remix

1. "Golden" (David Guetta remix) – 2:56
2. "Golden" (David Guetta remix extended) – 3:55

CD single

1. "Golden" – 3:14
2. "Golden" (David Guetta remix) – 2:56
3. "Golden" (sing-along) – 3:12

7-inch vinyl

1. "Golden" – 3:14
2. "Golden" (instrumental) – 3:12

Digital download and streaming

1. "Golden" – 3:14
2. "Golden" (Glowin' Version) – 3:10
3. "Golden" (sing-along) – 3:12
4. "Golden" (David Guetta remix) – 2:56
5. "Golden" (David Guetta remix (Extended)) – 3:55
6. "Golden" (instrumental) – 3:12
7. "Golden" (a cappella) – 3:12

== Personnel ==
- Ejae – vocals
- Audrey Nuna – vocals
- Rei Ami – vocals
- Ido – producer
- 24 – producer
- Teddy – producer
- Ian Eisendrath – producer, strings conducting, vocals arranging
- Derik Lee – vocals recording
- Noah Hubbell – vocals recording
- Curtis Douglas – mix engineering
- Dave Kutch – mastering
- Andy Dudman – strings recording
- Rob Mathes – strings arranging
- Hillary Skewes – strings contracting
- Oren Yaacoby – music editing
- Sandra Park – vocals contracting
- Mike Casteel – music preparation
- Jill Streater – music preparation
- Josh Fried – music associate

== Charts ==
=== Weekly charts ===
Weekly chart performance
Chart (2025–2026)	Peak position
Argentina Hot 100 (Billboard)	25
Argentina Airplay (Monitor Latino)	17
Australia (ARIA)	1
Austria (Ö3 Austria Top 40)	1
Austria Airplay (MusicTrace)	1
Belarus Airplay (TopHit)	12
Belgium (Billboard)	1
Belgium (Ultratop 50 Flanders)	14
Belgium (Ultratop 50 Wallonia)	2
Bolivia (Billboard)	13
Bolivia Airplay (Monitor Latino)	9
Brazil Hot 100 (Billboard)	47
Bulgaria Airplay (PROPHON)	1
Canada Hot 100 (Billboard)	1
Canada AC (Billboard)	5
Canada CHR/Top 40 (Billboard)	2
Canada Hot AC (Billboard)	2
Central America Anglo Airplay (Monitor Latino)	1
Central America + Caribbean Airplay (BMAT)	5
Chile (Billboard)	11
Chile Airplay (Monitor Latino)	6
Colombia (Colombia Hot 100) David Guetta Remix	25
CIS Airplay (TopHit)	1
Costa Rica Airplay (Monitor Latino)	5
Croatia (Billboard)	21
Croatia International Airplay (Top lista)	2
Czech Republic Airplay (ČNS IFPI)	2
Czech Republic Singles Digital (ČNS IFPI)	2
Denmark (Tracklisten)	4
Dominican Republic Anglo Airplay (Monitor Latino)	1
Ecuador (Billboard)	21
El Salvador Anglo Airplay (Monitor Latino)	4
Estonia Airplay (TopHit)	2
Finland (Suomen virallinen lista)	8
France (SNEP)	2
France Airplay (SNEP)	1
Germany (GfK)	1
Germany Airplay (MusicTrace)	2
Global 200 (Billboard)	1
Greece International (IFPI)	1
Guatemala Airplay (Monitor Latino)	18
Honduras Anglo Airplay (Monitor Latino)	1
Hong Kong (Billboard)	1
Hungary (Dance Top 40)	18
Hungary (Rádiós Top 40)	33
Hungary (Single Top 40)	7
Iceland (Tónlistinn)	1
India International (IMI)	10
Indonesia (IFPI)	19
Ireland (IRMA)	2
Israel (Mako Hitlist)	15
Italy (FIMI)	3
Italy Airplay (EarOne)	69
Japan Combined Singles (Oricon)	13
Japan Hot 100 (Billboard)	7
Japan Hot Animation (Billboard Japan)	3
Kazakhstan Airplay (TopHit)	3
Latin America Anglo Airplay (Monitor Latino)	1
Latvia Airplay (TopHit) David Guetta Remix	7
Latvia Streaming (LaIPA)	6
Lebanon (Lebanese Top 20)	2
Lithuania (AGATA)	16
Lithuania Airplay (TopHit)	1
Lithuania Airplay (TopHit) David Guetta Remix	98
Luxembourg (Billboard)	1
Malaysia (IFPI)	1
Malta Airplay (Radiomonitor)	4
Mexico (Billboard)	18
Mexico Airplay (Monitor Latino)	12
Middle East and North Africa (IFPI)	8
Moldova Airplay (TopHit)	16
Moldova Airplay (TopHit) David Guetta Remix	14
Netherlands (Dutch Top 40)	2
Netherlands (Single Top 100)	1
Netherlands Airplay (Dutch Charts)	7
New Zealand (Recorded Music NZ)	1
Nicaragua Anglo Airplay (Monitor Latino)	2
Nigeria (TurnTable Top 100)	23
Nigeria Airplay (TurnTable)	11
North Macedonia Airplay (Radiomonitor)	4
Norway (VG-lista)	1
Norway Airplay (IFPI)	2
Panama International (PRODUCE)	3
Paraguay Airplay (Monitor Latino)	8
Peru (Billboard)	6
Peru Airplay (Monitor Latino)	1
Philippines (IFPI)	2
Poland Airplay (OLiS)	2
Poland Streaming (OLiS)	7
Portugal (AFP)	2
Puerto Rico Anglo Airplay (Monitor Latino)	1
Romania Airplay (UPFR)	3
Romania Airplay (UPFR) David Guetta Remix	8
Romania Airplay (Media Forest) David Guetta Remix	2
Russia Airplay (TopHit)	5
Saudi Arabia (IFPI)	14
Serbia Airplay (Radiomonitor)	19
Singapore (RIAS)	1
Slovakia Airplay (ČNS IFPI)	4
Slovakia Singles Digital (ČNS IFPI)	4
Slovenia Airplay (Radiomonitor)	4
South Africa (Billboard)	13
South Africa Airplay (TOSAC)	5
South Africa Streaming (TOSAC)	16
South Korea (Circle)	1
South Korea Hot 100 (Billboard)	9
Spain (Promusicae)	1
Spain Airplay (Promusicae)	1
Suriname (Nationale Top 40)	5
Sweden (Sverigetopplistan)	1
Switzerland (Schweizer Hitparade)	1
Switzerland Airplay (MusicTrace)	2
Taiwan (Billboard)	1
Thailand (IFPI)	16
Turkey International Airplay (Radiomonitor Türkiye)	4
Ukraine Airplay (TopHit)	6
United Arab Emirates (IFPI)	1
UK Singles (Official Charts)	1
Uruguay Airplay (Monitor Latino)	9
US Billboard Hot 100	1
US Adult Contemporary (Billboard)	2
US Adult Pop Airplay (Billboard)	1
US Dance Airplay (Billboard)	10
US Pop Airplay (Billboard)	1
Venezuela Airplay (Record Report)	16
Vietnam (Billboard)	7

=== Monthly charts ===
Monthly chart performance
Chart (2025–2026)	Peak position
Belarus Airplay (TopHit)	14
CIS Airplay (TopHit)	1
Estonia Airplay (TopHit)	3
Kazakhstan Airplay (TopHit)	3
Latvia Airplay (TopHit) David Guetta Remix	7
Lithuania Airplay (TopHit)	1
Moldova Airplay (TopHit)	19
Moldova Airplay (TopHit) David Guetta Remix	23
Panama Streaming (PRODUCE)	48
Paraguay Airplay (SGP)	38
Romania Airplay (TopHit)	40
Romania Airplay (TopHit) David Guetta Remix	6
Russia Airplay (TopHit)	9
South Korea (Circle)	1
Ukraine Airplay (TopHit)	8

=== Year-end charts ===
Year-end chart performance
Chart (2025)	Position
Argentina Anglo Airplay (Monitor Latino)	31
Australia (ARIA)	2
Austria (Ö3 Austria Top 40)	6
Belarus Airplay (TopHit)	119
Belgium (Ultratop 50 Flanders)	67
Belgium (Ultratop 50 Wallonia)	35
Canada (Canadian Hot 100)	19
Canada AC (Billboard)	71
Canada CHR/Top 40 (Billboard)	49
Canada Hot AC (Billboard)	74
CIS Airplay (TopHit)	23
Denmark (Tracklisten)	35
Estonia Airplay (TopHit)	20
France (SNEP)	17
Germany (GfK)	5
Global 200 (Billboard)	10
Hungary (Single Top 40)	38
Iceland (Tónlistinn)	8
Italy (FIMI)	58
Japan (Japan Hot 100)	81
Japan Hot Animation (Billboard Japan)	15
Kazakhstan Airplay (TopHit)	61
Latvia Airplay (TopHit) David Guetta Remix	120
Lithuania Airplay (TopHit)	8
Netherlands (Dutch Top 40)	9
Netherlands (Single Top 100)	14
New Zealand (Recorded Music NZ)	2
Philippines (Philippines Hot 100)	15
Poland (Polish Airplay Top 100)	62
Poland (Polish Streaming Top 100)	30
Romania Airplay (TopHit) David Guetta Remix	64
Russia Airplay (TopHit)	53
South Korea (Circle)	3
Sweden (Sverigetopplistan)	6
Switzerland (Schweizer Hitparade)	11
UK Singles (OCC)	4
US Billboard Hot 100	25
US Pop Airplay (Billboard)	44

== Certifications ==
Certifications
Region	Certification	Certified units/sales
Australia (ARIA)	5× Platinum	350,000^{‡}
Austria (IFPI Austria)	Platinum	30,000^{‡}
Belgium (BRMA)	2× Platinum	80,000^{‡}
Brazil (Pro-Música Brasil)	3× Diamond	480,000^{‡}
Brazil (Pro-Música Brasil) Portuguese version	Gold	20,000^{‡}
Canada (Music Canada)	8× Platinum	640,000^{‡}
Denmark (IFPI Danmark)	Platinum	90,000^{‡}
France (SNEP)	Diamond	333,333^{‡}
Germany (BVMI)	3× Gold	900,000^{‡}
Italy (FIMI)	Platinum	200,000^{‡}
Mexico (AMPROFON)	2× Platinum+Gold	350,000^{‡}
New Zealand (RMNZ)	5× Platinum	150,000^{‡}
Poland (ZPAV)	Diamond	500,000^{‡}
Portugal (AFP)	5× Platinum	125,000^{‡}
Spain (Promusicae)	3× Platinum	300,000^{‡}
Switzerland (IFPI Switzerland)	2× Platinum	60,000^{‡}
United Kingdom (BPI)	3× Platinum	1,800,000^{‡}
United States (RIAA)	5× Platinum	5,000,000^{‡}
Streaming
Central America (CFC)	Platinum	7,000,000^{†}
Czech Republic (ČNS IFPI)	Platinum	5,000,000^{†}
Greece (IFPI Greece)	Platinum	2,000,000^{†}
Japan (RIAJ)	Platinum	100,000,000^{†}
Slovakia (ČNS IFPI)	Platinum	1,700,000^{†}
South Korea (KMCA)	Platinum	100,000,000^{†}
^{‡} Sales+streaming figures based on certification alone.^{†} Streaming-only figures based on certification alone.

== Release history ==
Release dates and formats
Region	Date	Format	Version	Label	Ref.
Various	July 4, 2025	Digital download; streaming	Original; instrumental; acapella	Republic	
United States	July 8, 2025	Contemporary hit radio	Original	Republic	
Italy	July 24, 2025	Radio airplay	Original	Island	
Various	July 25, 2025	Digital download; streaming	David Guetta remix; extended remix	Republic	
Various	October 17, 2025	CD single	Original; David Guetta remix; sing-along	Republic	
Various	November 21, 2025	7-inch vinyl	Original; instrumental	Republic	
Various	January 9, 2026	Digital download; streaming	Glowin' Version	Republic	
