= Billboard Global 200 =

Weekly global songs chart published by Billboard

The Billboard Global 200 is a weekly record chart published by Billboard. It ranks the top songs globally and is based on digital sales and online streaming from over 200 territories worldwide. First announced in mid-2019, it launched in September 2020.

== Conception ==
Billboard had been working on the idea of a global chart for over two years prior to its launch. The chart was first announced on May 6, 2019, then envisioned as the "Global 100" and it was to launch later that year. The motivation for the chart's conception was "to expose people to music from multiple territories and in time", to provide "overdue exposure and recognition for acts from international markets". With the chart's official announcement on September 14, 2020, Billboard described it as "the first authoritative charts ranking the top songs globally", and stated that basing the chart on worldwide streams and download sales, "will give an accurate glimpse into the most popular songs on the planet".

Establishing a global chart was dependent on the availability of the data, as well as having the various streaming and digital retail services "willing to participate and provide data"; Billboard considered this "not an easy task" and the reason why it took so long to launch a global chart.

"As the steward of the definitive industry charts, we're thrilled to unveil out our global charts which give the industry insights into the most powerful artists worldwide, what songs have an international impact, as well as what songs may start trending outside of the United States". – MRC Data and MRC Media & Info president Deanna Brown.

The chart officially premiered on Billboard's website on September 15, 2020, for the chart week dated September 19, 2020. The first number-one song on the chart was "WAP" by Cardi B featuring Megan Thee Stallion.

== Compilation ==
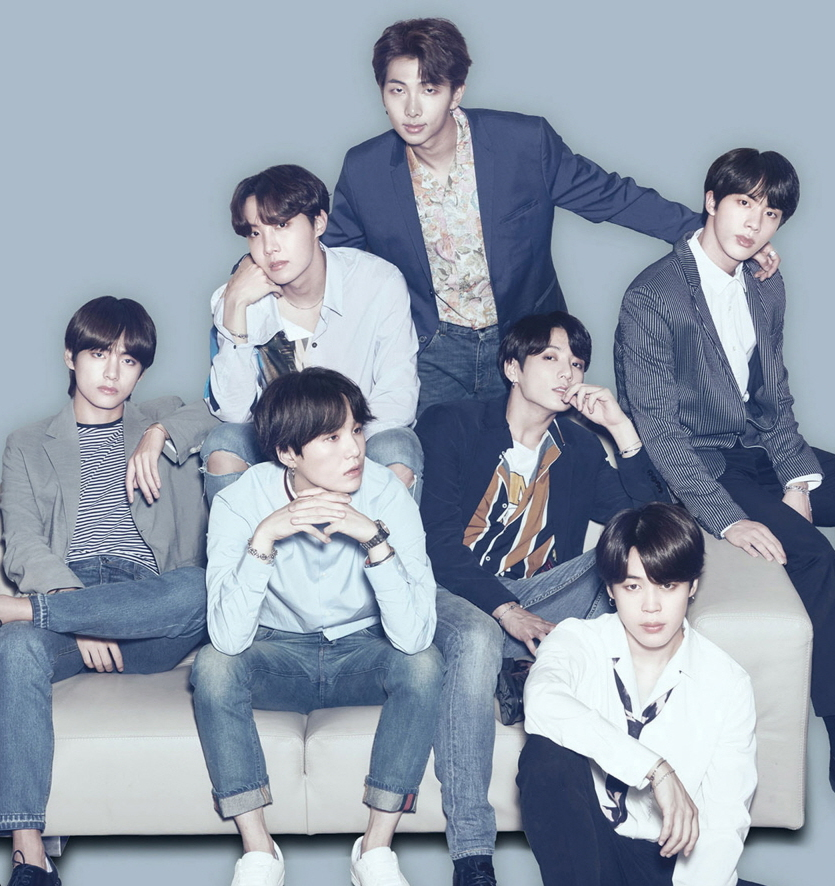
South Korean boy band BTS has achieved eight number-one songs on the Global 200, tying for the most of any act.

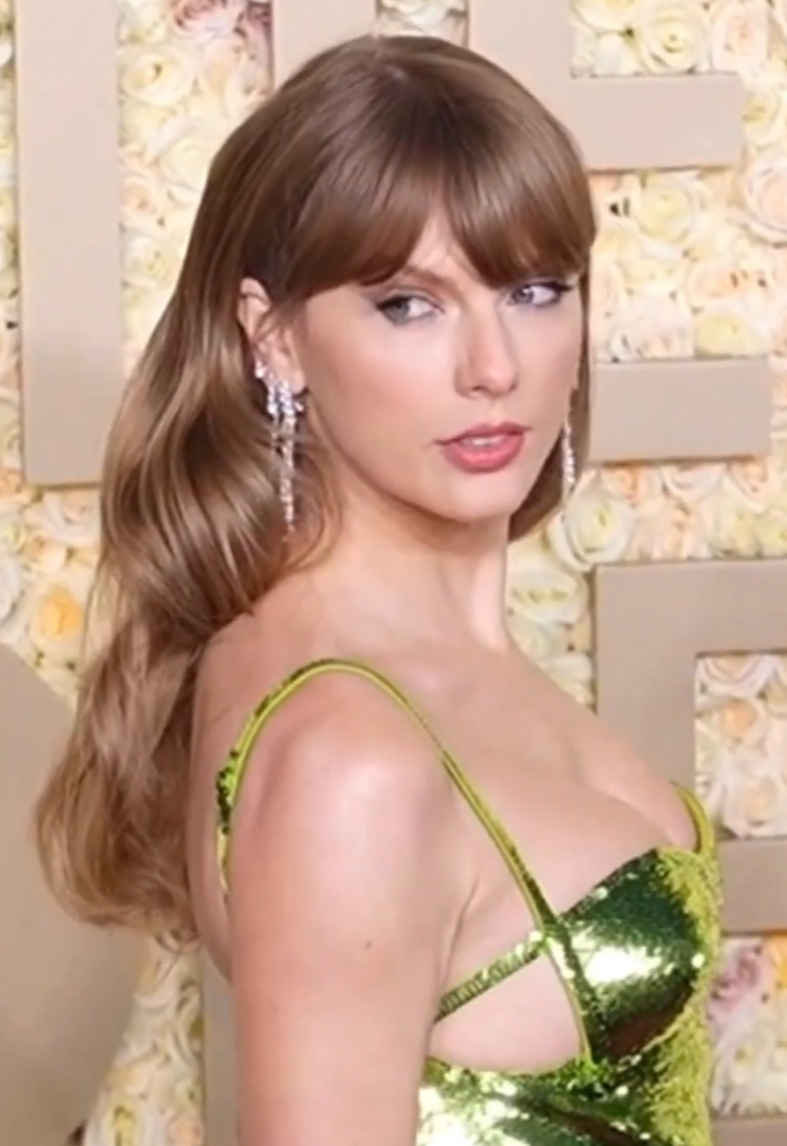
American singer Taylor Swift has achieved eight number-one songs on the Global 200, tying for the most of any act.

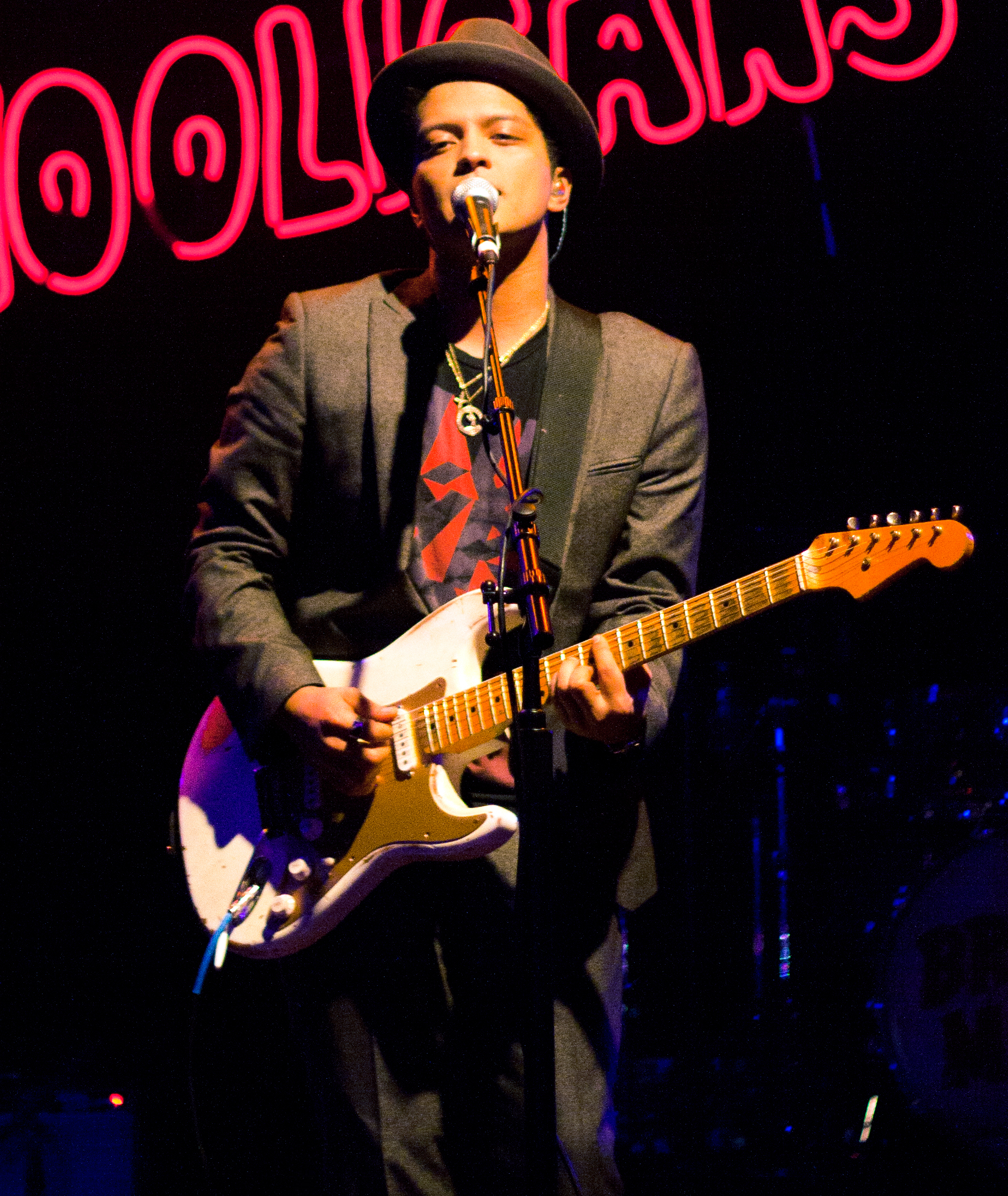
American singer-songwriter Bruno Mars is the longest-reigning act of the Global 200, spending 31 weeks atop the chart.

The chart methodology includes sales and streaming data from more than 200 territories. Positions are measured on a weighted formula which incorporates official streams from both subscription and ad-supported levels of top digital platforms, including both audio and video music services, and download sales from top music retailers from around the world, with sales from direct-to-consumer (D2C) sites excluded. Streams are "weighted" through paid subscriptions holding more weight than streams from free subscriptions. On the question about the increasing prevalence of fake streams that call into question whether consumers can trust the information on music streaming platforms, Billboard explained that they "have worked closely with our data providers to implement various audit guidelines to limit any significant effect of manufactured streams. In addition, each data provider has their own safeguards in place to recognize fraudulent behavior and catch it before it gets to their data partners, including Billboard and MRC Data".

Unlike the US-based Billboard Hot 100, the Global 200 does not have a "recurrent" rule, therefore allowing songs from any period in music history to chart. The recurrent rule on the Hot 100 indicates that descending songs are removed once they fall below number 25 after 52 weeks, or once below number 50 after 20 weeks. The chart does not factor in any form of radio airplay, as, according to MRC Data, "The focus was on metrics that could be systematically measured in each country", considering how "unlike streaming and download sales, radio is not reliably measured at this time [2020] in many territories and, even if tracked, is not done consistently from country to country". As such, the chart has been noted for being similar to the Rolling Stone Top 100, which, although it is a US song chart, also incorporates only sales and streams in their chart formula.

The chart follows a "unique, revenue-reflective" methodology reflecting the global market.
The official chart methodology is as follows:

- One track sale = 200 premium streams = 900 ad-supported
- The ad-supported to premium stream ratio is 4.5 to 1

Each ranking is based on stream equivalent units using the following formula: (Tracks * 200) + premium streams + (ad-supported streams / 4.5)inate

The chart follows a Friday–Thursday tracking week. It is compiled by Luminate through their Music Connect product and is published every Tuesday on Billboard.com.

== Billboard Global Excl. US ==
Along with the Global 200, Billboard launched another, similar chart: the Billboard Global Excl. US chart. This chart follows the same formula as the Global 200, except, as the name suggests, it covers all territories excluding the US. Billboard stated their reasoning for having two charts: "One of the goals for this project was to expose people to music from multiple territories. So having each chart go 200 titles deep and also presenting a view of titles excluding U.S. influence was of great importance to us". The first number-one song for the chart dated September 19, 2020, was "Hawái" by Maluma.

== Song milestones ==
=== Most weeks at number one on the Global 200 ===
Number of weeks	Artist(s)	Song	Year(s)	Ref.
20	Mariah Carey	"All I Want for Christmas Is You"	2020–25	
18	Lady Gaga and Bruno Mars	"Die with a Smile"	2024–25	
18	Huntrix: Ejae, Audrey Nuna and Rei Ami	"Golden"	2025	
15	Harry Styles	"As It Was"	2022	
13	Miley Cyrus	"Flowers"	2023	
12	Rosé and Bruno Mars	"APT."	2024–25	

=== Most consecutive weeks at number one on the Global 200 ===
Number of weeks	Artist(s)	Song	Year(s)	Ref.
11	Huntrix: Ejae, Audrey Nuna and Rei Ami	"Golden"	2025	
10	Alex Warren	"Ordinary"	2025	
9	The Kid Laroi and Justin Bieber	"Stay"	2021	
9	Harry Styles	"As It Was"	2022	
9	Rosé and Bruno Mars	"APT."	2024	
9	Lady Gaga and Bruno Mars	"Die with a Smile"	2025	
8	Olivia Rodrigo	"Drivers License"	2021	
8	Lady Gaga and Bruno Mars	"Die with a Smile"	2024	
7	Jung Kook featuring Latto	"Seven"	2023	

=== Most total weeks on the Global 200 ===
Number of weeks	Artist(s)	Song	Year entered	Year departed	Ref.
317	The Weeknd	"Blinding Lights"	2020	ongoing	
317	Ed Sheeran	"Perfect"	2020	ongoing	
316	Ed Sheeran	"Shape of You"	2020	ongoing	
314	The Neighbourhood	"Sweater Weather"	2020	ongoing	
309	Post Malone and Swae Lee	"Sunflower"	2020	ongoing	
300	The Weeknd and Ariana Grande	"Save Your Tears"	2021	ongoing	

== Artist achievements ==
=== Most number-one singles ===
Total songs	Artist	Ref.
8	BTS	
8	Taylor Swift	
5	Bad Bunny	
5	Ariana Grande	
5	Olivia Rodrigo	
3	Drake	
3	Jung Kook	
3	Blackpink	
3	Bruno Mars	
3	Harry Styles	
3	Justin Bieber	

=== Most weeks at number one ===
Total weeks	Artist
31	Bruno Mars
20	Mariah Carey
19	Olivia Rodrigo
18	Lady Gaga
18	Huntrix
18	Ejae
18	Audrey Nuna
18	Rei Ami
18	Taylor Swift
17	Harry Styles

=== Most top ten entries ===
Number of singles	Artist	Ref.
47	Taylor Swift	
37	Drake	
25	Bad Bunny	
21	BTS	
16	21 Savage	

=== Most total entries ===
Entries	Artist	Ref.
193	Taylor Swift	
144	Drake	
105	Bad Bunny	
87	Future	
79	Lil Baby	

=== Most single-week entries ===
Entries	Artist	Date	Ref.
34	Taylor Swift	May 4, 2024	
31	Taylor Swift	November 27, 2021	
30	Bad Bunny	February 21, 2026	
30	Playboi Carti	March 29, 2025	
29	Morgan Wallen	May 31, 2025	
27	Bad Bunny	May 21, 2022	

=== Most simultaneous entries in the top five ===
Number	Artist	Date	Ref.
5	Taylor Swift	May 4, 2024	
5	Taylor Swift	November 11, 2023	
5	Taylor Swift	November 5, 2022	
5	Bad Bunny	February 21, 2026	
5	BTS	April 4, 2026	
4	Taylor Swift	October 18, 2025	
4	Taylor Swift	October 10, 2026	
4	Bad Bunny	February 28, 2026	
3	Bad Bunny	January 25, 2025	
3	Ariana Grande	August 15, 2026	

=== Most simultaneous entries in the top ten ===
Number	Artist	Date	Ref.
9	Taylor Swift	November 5, 2022	
9	Taylor Swift	May 4, 2024	
9	Taylor Swift	October 18, 2025	
9	BTS	April 4, 2026	
8	Drake	September 18, 2021	
8	Drake	November 19, 2022	
7	Bad Bunny	May 21, 2022	
7	Taylor Swift	November 11, 2023	
5	Harry Styles	June 4, 2022	
5	Drake	October 21, 2023	
5	Bad Bunny	January 25, 2025	
5	Bad Bunny	February 21, 2026	
5	Bad Bunny	February 28, 2026	
5	Ariana Grande	August 15, 2026	
5	Taylor Swift	October 10, 2026	

=== Most number-one singles on the Global 200 Excl. US ===
Total songs	Artist	Ref.
8	BTS	
5	Taylor Swift	
4	Bad Bunny	
4	Blackpink	
4	Ariana Grande	
3	Jung Kook	
3	Justin Bieber	
3	Olivia Rodrigo	
2	Bizarrap	
2	Harry Styles	
2	Sabrina Carpenter	
2	Rosé	
2	Bruno Mars	

=== Most weeks at number one on the Global 200 Excl. US ===
Total weeks	Artist
36	Bruno Mars
26	BTS
20	Rosé
20	Huntrix
20	Ejae
20	Audrey Nuna
20	Rei Ami
17	Lady Gaga
16	Justin Bieber
14	Harry Styles
14	Mariah Carey
14	Taylor Swift

=== Most top ten entries on the Global 200 Excl. US ===
Number of singles	Artist	Ref.
34	Taylor Swift	
24	Bad Bunny	
21	BTS	
12	The Weeknd	
11	Ariana Grande	

=== Most total entries on the Global 200 Excl. US ===
Entries	Artist	Ref.
172	Taylor Swift	
125	Drake	
105	Bad Bunny	
61	Ariana Grande	
60	The Weeknd	
