= Las Vegas Film Critics Society =

American film critics association

- Abbreviation: LVFCS
- Formation: 1997
- Type: Film criticism
- Location: Las Vegas, Nevada, United States
- Website: lvfcs.org

The Las Vegas Film Critics Society (LVFCS) is a non-profit organization of select print, television, radio and online film critics based in the Las Vegas area. Founded in 1997 by Jeffrey K. Howard and David Neil, the LVFCS recognizes achievements in filmmaking throughout their annual awards and dedicates on the advancement and preservation of film.

== Sierra Awards ==
The LVFCS has annually presented the Sierra Awards, honoring the best films and performances of the year. Categories include the William Holden Lifetime Achievement Award, which was first presented to Jack Lemmon in 2000.

=== Award categories ===
- Top 10 Films
- Best Picture
- Best Actor
- Best Actress
- Best Supporting Actor
- Best Supporting Actress
- Best Director
- Best Original Screenplay
- Best Adapted Screenplay
- Best Cinematography
- Best Film Editing
- Best Score
- Best Song
- Best Documentary
- Best Animated Film
- Best International Film
- Best Costume Design
- Best Art Direction
- Best Visual Effects
- Best Action Film
- Best Comedy
- Best Horror/Sci-Fi
- Best Family Film
- Best Animal Performance
- Best Ensemble
- Breakout Filmmaker
- Best Stunts
- Best Male Youth Performance (Under 21)
- Best Female Youth Performance (Under 21)
- William Holden Lifetime Achievement Award

=== Best Picture winners ===
Year	Best Picture	Ref.
2025	One Battle After Another	
2024	Dune: Part Two	
2023	Oppenheimer	
2022	Everything Everywhere All at Once	
2021	Belfast	
2020	Nomadland	
2019	Once Upon a Time in Hollywood	
2018	Roma	
2017	Three Billboards Outside Ebbing, Missouri	
2016	La La Land	
2015	Spotlight	
2014	Birdman	
2013	12 Years a Slave	
2012	Life of Pi	
2011	The Artist	
2010	The Social Network	
2009	The Hurt Locker	
2008	Frost/Nixon	
2007	No Country for Old Men	
2006	The Departed	
2005	Brokeback Mountain	
2004	The Aviator	
2003	The Lord of the Rings: The Return of the King	
2002	Confessions of a Dangerous Mind	
2001	Memento	
2000	Erin Brockovich	
1999	American Beauty	
1998	Saving Private Ryan	
1997	Titanic	

== See also ==
- List of film awards
