= Daniel Rojas (Costa Rican composer) =

Costa Rican musician and composer

- Born: Daniel Rojas Wang; 1988; Heredia, Costa Rica
- Origin: Los Angeles, California, United States
- Genres: Film score
- Occupations: Composer, producer, arranger, guitarist
- Years active: 2009–present
- Website: http://danielrojas.com/ https://www.506music.com/

Daniel Rojas (born 1988) is a Costa Rican musician and composer primarily working in the fields of film and television.

== Biography ==
Born in Heredia, Costa Rica, into a musical family, Rojas studied Jazz Arranging & Composition at the University of North Texas in Denton, Texas, on scholarship. After graduating in 2010, he moved full-time into session player work, primarily as a guitarist. His film and television work has included working as an assistant composer, arranger, and music team member for composers such as Hans Zimmer, Klaus Badelt, and Alan Menken. Rojas also performed as a member of Demi Lovato's band, and also worked as a guitarist on recordings by artists such as Bryan Adams and Jason Mraz, among others.

Session work eventually gave way to composing and arranging scores and songs for movies and television shows. His film projects have included songwriting for Money Monster (2016), directed by Jodie Foster and starring Foster and George Clooney, and Downsizing (2017), directed by Alexander Payne and starring Matt Damon. Television composition work has included scores for The Demon Files featuring Sean Astin (2015, Destination America), and True Nightmares featuring Tim Robbins (2015–2018, Investigation Discovery).

Currently, Rojas is the series composer for Kipo and the Age of Wonderbeasts, a DreamWorks Animation television series. He composes both score music and songs for the series, which stars the voices of Karen Fukuhara, Deon Cole, Coy Stewart, Sydney Mikayla, and Dee Bradley Baker. The first season of Kipo debuted on Netflix on January 14, 2020, with the Kipo and the Age of Wonderbeasts (Season 1 Mixtape) soundtrack album debuting a few days earlier on January 10. Both his music composition and production company, 506 Music, and his music library production company, Nimble Music (co-owned with Jack Gravina), are based out of Culver City, California.

== Selected filmography ==
=== Film ===
Year	Title	Director	Role
2012	30º Couleur	Lucien Jean-Baptiste et Philippe Larue	Additional music, assistant to Klaus Badelt
2012	The Philly Kid	Jason Connery	Additional music, guitarist
2013	Beyond All Boundaries	Sushrut Jain	Musician, featured soloist
2015	Room	Lenny Abrahamson	Co-songwriter & co-performer: "Bag Fight"
2016	Money Monster	Jodie Foster	Song arrangements
2017	Downsizing	Alexander Payne	Songwriter: "Manjing Jam" (also performer); "Green Emerald" (also performer); "Extraordinary" (also performer); "Billy-Jane Doe"; "Avago"; "Un Reve"; "My Belo Horizonte"; Performer: "Monday Monday"
2024	Fly Hard	Elisabeth Patte and Hélène Galtier	Short film
2025	KPop Demon Hunters	Maggie Kang and Chris Appelhans	Co-Songwriter: "Hunter's Mantra" (with Ejae and Mark Sonnenblick); "Jinu's Lament" (with Mark Sonnenblick); "How It's Done" (with Ejae and Mark Sonnenblick); "What It Sounds Like" (with Jenna Andrews, Stephen Kirk, Ejae and Mark Sonnenblick)

=== Television ===
Year	Title	Network	Role
2012	Transporter: The Series	RTL (Germany); M6 (France); HBO Canada (Canada, English); Super Écran 1 (Canada, French)	Music team (4 episodes)
2015	The Demon Files	Destination America	Music by (6 episodes)
2015	True Nightmares	Investigation Discovery	Music by (6 episodes)
2020	Kipo and the Age of Wonderbeasts	Netflix	Original score and songs
2021	M.O.D.O.K.	Hulu	Music by (10 episodes)
2021	Hit-Monkey	Hulu	Music by (10 episodes)
2022	Monster High	Nickelodeon	Original score
