= IHeartRadio Music Award for Best Duo/Group of the Year =

Music award category

iHeartRadio Music Award for Best Duo/Group of the Year
- Country: United States
- Presented by: iHeartRadio
- First award: 2016
- Currently held by: Huntrix: Ejae, Audrey Nuna, Rei Ami (2026)

Highlights
- Most wins: Maroon 5 (2)
- Most nominations: Maroon 5 (7)

The iHeartRadio Music Award for Best Duo/Group of the Year is one of the awards handed out at the yearly iHeartRadio Music Awards. It was first awarded in 2016 and presented to Maroon 5. Maroon 5 are the most awarded artist in this category, with a total of two wins. They are also the most nominated artists in this category, with a total of seven nominations.

== Winners and nominees ==
Year (Note: Each year is linked to the article about the iHeartRadio Music Awards held that year.)	Winner(s)	Nominees	Ref.
2016	(United States) Maroon 5	(United States) Fall Out Boy; (United Kingdom) One Direction; (United States) Walk the Moon; (United States) Zac Brown Band	
2017	(United States) Twenty One Pilots	(United States) The Chainsmokers; (United Kingdom) Coldplay; (United States) DNCE; (United States) Florida Georgia Line	
2018	(United States) Maroon 5	(United States) The Chainsmokers; (United States) Imagine Dragons; (United States) Migos; (United States) Portugal. The Man	
2019	(Australia) 5 Seconds of Summer	(United States) Imagine Dragons; (United States) Maroon 5; (United States) Panic! at the Disco; (United States) Twenty One Pilots	
2020	(United States) Jonas Brothers	(United States) Dan + Shay; (United States) Imagine Dragons; (United States) Maroon 5; (United States) Panic! at the Disco	
2021	(United States) Dan + Shay	(South Korea) BTS; (United States) Jonas Brothers; (United States) Maroon 5; (United States) Twenty One Pilots	
2022	(United States) Silk Sonic	(United States) AJR; (South Korea) BTS; (United States) Dan + Shay; (United States) Maroon 5	
2023	(United States) Imagine Dragons	(United States) AJR; (United States) Black Eyed Peas; (South Korea) Blackpink; (United States) Silk Sonic; (United Kingdom) Glass Animals; (Italy) Måneskin; (United States) OneRepublic; (United States) Parmalee; (United States) Red Hot Chili Peppers	
2024	(United States) OneRepublic	(South Korea) (G)I-dle; (United States) Blink-182; (United States) Dan + Shay; (United States) Fall Out Boy; (United States) Foo Fighters; (United States) Jonas Brothers; (Italy) Måneskin; (United States) Paramore; (United States) Parmalee	
2026	Huntrix: Ejae, Audrey Nuna, Rei Ami	(United States) Linkin Park; (United States) Maroon 5; (United States) Shinedown; (United States) Twenty One Pilots	

== Statistics ==
=== Artists with multiple wins ===
2 wins

- Maroon 5

=== Artists with multiple nominations ===
7 nominations

- Maroon 5

4 nominations

- Imagine Dragons
- Dan + Shay
- Twenty One Pilots

3 nominations

- Jonas Brothers

2 nominations

- AJR
- BTS
- The Chainsmokers
- Fall Out Boy
- Måneskin
- OneRepublic
- Panic! at the Disco
- Parmalee
- Silk Sonic
