= Jeong Hoon Seo =

Jeong Hoon Seo 서정훈
- Born: January 1, 1990 (age 36); South Korea
- Occupations: Music producer, songwriter
- Label: The Black Label

Jeong Hoon Seo (Korean: 서정훈; born January 1, 1990), also known as Seo Jeong Hun and by the pseudonym 24, is a South Korean music producer and songwriter. He is affiliated with The Black Label.

== Biography ==
Seo Jeong-hoon is also known under the pseudonym 24. He is part of the record label The Black Label, a subsidiary of the South Korean entertainment company YG Entertainment, which manages artists and groups such as Blackpink, BigBang, and Jeon Somi.

Jeong-hoon works as both a music producer and songwriter. In 2023, he was promoted to a full member of the Korea Music Copyright Association.

Seo Jeong-hoon contributed as a songwriter and producer to several tracks on the soundtrack of the film KPop Demon Hunters (2025), including the Academy Award-winning song Golden.

At the Grammy Awards 2026, he made history by delivering an acceptance speech in both English and Korean, thanking his mentor, rapper Teddy Park, as a pioneer of K-pop. He and his songwriting team received the award for Best Song Written for Visual Media, which he accepted on their behalf. This marked the first Grammy win for a K-pop song.

He also received a Golden Globe Award for the song.

== Discography (selected) ==
- 2017: Taeyang – White Night
- 2018: Blackpink – Blackpink in Your Area
- 2020: Blackpink – The Album
- 2021: Blackpink – Blackpink: The Show
- 2022: Blackpink – Born Pink
- 2025: G-Dragon – Übermensch
- 2025: KPop Demon Hunters Soundtrack

== Accolades ==
=== Awards and nominations ===
Name of the award ceremony, year presented, award category, nominee of the award and the result of the nomination
Award ceremony	Year	Category	Nominee/work	Result	Ref.
Academy Awards	2026	Best Original Song	"Golden" (Note: with Ejae, Mark Sonnenblick, Teddy Park, IDO)	Won	
Advanced Imaging Society Lumiere Awards	2026	Best Original Song	"Golden"	Won	
American Cinematheque	2026	Tribute to the Crafts Feature Film Song	"Golden"	Honored	
Annie Awards	2025	Outstanding Achievement for Music in a Feature Production	KPop Demon Hunters (Note: with KPop Demon Hunters Music Team.)	Won	
Asian Pop Music Awards	2021	Best Composer (Overseas)	"Dumb Dumb" (Note: with Teddy Park, R.Tee, Dominsuk)	Nominated	
Asian Pop Music Awards	2021	Best Composer (Overseas)	"Lalisa" (Note: with Teddy Park, R.Tee, Bekuh Boom, Vince)	Nominated	
Asian Pop Music Awards	2021	Best Composer (Overseas)	"XOXO" (Note: with Pink Sweats, Teddy Park, Jeon Somi, Kush, Pacific, Danny Chung, Vince)	Nominated	
Asian Pop Music Awards	2021	Best Composer (Overseas)	"Gone" (Note: with Brian Lee)	Nominated	
Asian Pop Music Awards	2022	Best Composer (Overseas)	"Pink Venom" (Note: with Teddy Park, R.Tee, IDO)	Nominated	
Asian Pop Music Awards	2022	Best Producer (Overseas)	Born Pink (Note: with Teddy Park, R.Tee, Freddy Wexler, Nohc, Paro)	Won	
Astra Film Awards	2026	Best Original Song	"Golden"	Won	
Critics Association of Central Florida	2026	Best Original Song	"Golden"	Won	
Chicago Indie Critics	2026	Best Original Song	"Golden"	Nominated	
Critics' Choice Movie Awards	2026	Best Song	"Golden"	Won	
Denver Film Critics Society	2026	Best Song	"Golden"	Won	
DiscussingFilm's Global Film Critics Awards	2026	Best Original Song	"Golden"	Won	
Dorian Award	2026	Film Music of the Year	KPop Demon Hunters	Nominated	
Georgia Film Critics Association	2025	Best Original Song	"Golden"	Runner-up	
Gold Derby Film Awards	2026	Best Original Song	"Golden"	Won	
Golden Globe Awards	2026	Best Original Song	"Golden"	Won	
Grammy Awards	2026	Song of the Year	"Golden"	Nominated	
Grammy Awards	2026	Best Song Written for Visual Media	"Golden"	Won	
Hollywood Music in Media Awards	2025	Original Song – Animated Film	"Golden"	Won	
Houston Film Critics Society	2025	Best Original Song	"Golden"	Won	
Las Vegas Film Critics Society	2025	Best Song	"Golden"	Nominated	
Latino Entertainment Journalists Association	2026	Best Song	"Golden"	Won	
MAMA Awards	2025	Song of the Year	"Golden"	Nominated	
MAMA Awards	2025	Song of the Year	"Soda Pop" (Note: with Kush, Vince, Danny Chung, Dominsuk)	Nominated	
New Jersey Film Critics Circle	2025	Best Original Song	"Golden"	Won	
New Mexico Film Critics Association Awards	2025	Best Original Song	"Golden"	Runner-up	
North Carolina Film Critics Association	2026	Best Original Song	"Golden"	Won	
North Carolina Film Critics Association	2026	Best Original Song	"What It Sounds Like" (Note: with Ejae, Daniel Rojas, Mark Sonnenblick, Teddy, IDO)	Nominated	
The Online Film & Television Association	2026	Best Original Song	"Golden"	Runner-up	
Pittsburgh Film Critics Association	2026	Best Song	"Golden"	Runner-up	
Puerto Rico Critics Association	2026	Best Original Song	"Golden"	Won	
Satellite Awards	2026	Best Original Song	"Golden"	Nominated	
Songwriters of North America	2026	Global Impact Award	KPop Demon Hunters (Note: with KPop Demon Hunters Songwriting team)	Honored	
World Soundtrack Awards	2026	Best Original Song	"Golden"	Won	

=== Listicles ===
Name of publisher, year listed, name of listicle, and placement
Publisher	Year	Listicle	Placement	Ref.
Gold House	2026	Gold100 List (Note: with Ejae, Rei Ami, Audrey Nuna, Teddy, IDO)	Included	
