= Your Idol =

Promotional single by Saja Boys

from the album KPop Demon Hunters
- Released: August 27, 2025
- Genre: K-pop
- Length: 3:11
- Label: Republic
- Songwriters: Ejae; Kush; Mark Sonnenblick; Vince; 24; Ido
- Producers: 24; Ido; Ian Eisendrath

Audio video
- "Your Idol" on YouTube

Lyric video
- "Your Idol" on YouTube

"Your Idol" is a song performed by Andrew Choi, Neckwav, Danny Chung, Kevin Woo and samUIL Lee as the fictional K-pop boy group the Saja Boys in the 2025 animated musical fantasy film, KPop Demon Hunters. It was released on August 27, 2025, through Republic Records, as a promotional single for the film's soundtrack album. The song was written by Ejae, Kush, Mark Sonnenblick and Vince and produced by 24, Ido and Ian Eisendrath.

== Background and theme ==
"Your Idol" was created for the animated musical fantasy film KPop Demon Hunters. The song is used as the penultimate musical number, where the Saja Boys – an antagonistic demon boy band – perform it at Namsan Tower to summon the film's main antagonist, Gwi-Ma, and feed him the souls of their magically entranced audience.

Ejae received the instrumental track of the song from The Black Label and executive music producer Ian Eisendrath with Exo references. She worked on the lyrics with The Black Label songwriters Kush and Vince. Ejae took inspiration from Christian hymns in writing the song, as well as Exo's songs "Mama" and "Obsession". The choir portion, in particular, was inspired by the choral arrangement in the former song. For the intro to "Your Idol", she reversed the audio for the song "Hunter's Mantra" and harmonized it on the demo. Ejae added harmonies and sounds to evoke a cathedral and create a "creepier" atmosphere with "a kind of old Latin vibe". The song's opening additionally features lyrics evoking the Latin sequence "Dies Irae". Ian Eisendrath brought in a Broadway vocalist to create the full choir for the track.

The lyrics of the song are written in two main stanzas of eight verses each, with supporting choruses, pre-choruses, and post-choruses. The first stanza invokes the theme of temptation and seduction of audiences to worship the new boy band. In the second stanza, the temptation is completed with the singers claiming to successfully be the worshiped idols of their fans. The main chorus repeats once for each of both of the main stanzas. The lyrics are extended somewhat in the soundtrack version of the song which is longer than the film version by more than half; the film version is just under two minutes.

The song's use in the film marks a pivotal moment in the storyline, a "dramatic" shift to "sleek, jet-black silhouettes" as the boy band reveals their true form in full demon-like, all-black attire. "Your Idol" is a direct contrast to the Saja Boys' film introduction song "Soda Pop" which was described as a "super bubblegum-y K-pop boy band songs" similar to BTS' "Butter". The lyrics find them appealing to their fans' obsession to them, in an effort to tempt them into allowing the band to steal their souls. Debashree Dutta of Rolling Stone India highlighted "a jarring contrast" between the two Saja Boys songs, noting that "Your Idol" reveals "the Saja Boys' true nature while cleverly critiquing the darker side of fame and obsessive fan culture".

Baek Byung-yeul of The Korea Times stated the styling of the two fictional K-pop groups in the film connects to "the past and the present of Korea". In the film, the Saja Boys perform "Your Idol" in black hanbok and traditional horsehair hats, evoking "the image of the jeoseung saja, the Korean equivalent of the grim reaper". According to co-director Maggie Kang, the idea of portraying the group as "jeoseung saja" was one of the film's earliest concepts. Kang described it as "a very iconic image" that had never been explored in animation before. The scene aimed to give the Saja Boys' leader, Jinu, a "more traditional look" during the performance while drawing the audience into the dark underworld through striking color effects.

== Composition ==
In an interview during December 2025, Danny Chung summarized the process of composing the song stating:

The Saja Boys only get those two moments in music, the 'Soda Pop' moment and the 'Your Idol' moment. It was, by design, supposed to show duality, and I think that is a common thread of this movie: duality, and having two sides that don’t feel like they belong together, but they’re all intertwined within one being or one entity. 'Soda Pop' was sinister in secret, and 'Your Idol' was sinister in your face. And I think that that soundscape of 'Your Idol' really gets that message across.

For Chung, the composition of the song was influenced by the strong contrast of styles between "Your Idol" and "Soda Pop".

== Commercial performance ==
For the chart dated July 3, 2025, "Your Idol" reached number one on the US Spotify chart, marking the highest placement ever for a K-pop boy band and surpassing BTS's 2020 song "Dynamite". It became only the fourth K-pop track to top the chart, following Jung Kook's "Seven" (2023), Jimin's "Who" (2024) and Rosé's "Apt." (2024).

=== Listicles ===
Name of publisher, year listed, name of listicle, and placement
Publisher	Year	Listicle	Placement	Ref.
Billboard	2025	The 100 Best Songs of 2025	94th	
YouTube	2025	Top Songs	5th	
YouTube Korea	2025	Most Popular Song	10th	

== Track listing ==
7-inch vinyl, digital download and streaming

1. "Your Idol" – 3:11
2. "Your Idol" (instrumental) – 3:11

== Charts ==
=== Weekly charts ===
Weekly chart performance
Chart (2025–2026)	Peak position
Australia (ARIA)	4
Austria (Ö3 Austria Top 40)	14
Canada (Canadian Hot 100)	8
Czech Republic Singles Digital (ČNS IFPI)	20
Denmark (Tracklisten)	32
France (SNEP)	128
Germany (GfK)	9
Global 200 (Billboard)	3
Greece International Streaming (IFPI)	24
Hong Kong (Billboard)	17
Hungary (Single Top 40)	30
Iceland (Tónlistinn)	9
Ireland (IRMA)	17
Israel (Mako Hitlist)	61
Lithuania (AGATA)	38
Malaysia (IFPI)	3
Malaysia International Streaming (RIM)	2
Netherlands (Single Top 100)	41
New Zealand (Recorded Music NZ)	4
Nigeria (TurnTable Top 100)	93
Norway (IFPI Norge)	8
Peru Anglo Airplay (Monitor Latino)	11
Philippines (IFPI)	18
Philippines (Philippines Hot 100)	14
Poland (Polish Streaming Top 100)	22
Portugal (AFP)	61
Singapore (RIAS)	4
Slovakia Singles Digital (ČNS IFPI)	27
South Africa Streaming (TOSAC)	42
South Korea (Circle)	6
Sweden (Sverigetopplistan)	9
Switzerland (Schweizer Hitparade)	32
Taiwan (Billboard)	5
United Arab Emirates (IFPI)	18
UK Singles (Official Charts)	5
US Billboard Hot 100	4
Vietnam (Vietnam Hot 100)	19

=== Monthly charts ===
Monthly chart performance
Chart (2025)	Peak position
Lithuania Airplay (TopHit)	93
South Korea (Circle)	6

=== Year-end charts ===
Year-end chart performance
Chart (2025)	Position
Australia (ARIA)	36
Austria (Ö3 Austria Top 40)	59
Canada (Canadian Hot 100)	48
Germany (GfK)	64
Global 200 (Billboard)	76
Hungary (Single Top 40)	96
New Zealand (Recorded Music NZ)	22
Philippines (Philippines Hot 100)	82
South Korea (Circle)	57
UK Singles (OCC)	44
US Billboard Hot 100	54

== Certifications ==
Certifications
Region	Certification	Certified units/sales
Australia (ARIA)	2× Platinum	140,000^{‡}
Belgium (BRMA)	Gold	20,000^{‡}
Brazil (Pro-Música Brasil)	3× Platinum	120,000^{‡}
Canada (Music Canada)	2× Platinum	160,000^{‡}
Denmark (IFPI Danmark)	Gold	45,000^{‡}
France (SNEP)	Gold	100,000^{‡}
Mexico (AMPROFON)	Gold	70,000^{‡}
New Zealand (RMNZ)	2× Platinum	60,000^{‡}
Poland (ZPAV)	Platinum	125,000^{‡}
Portugal (AFP)	Gold	12,000^{‡}
Spain (Promusicae)	Gold	50,000^{‡}
United Kingdom (BPI)	Platinum	600,000^{‡}
United States (RIAA)	Platinum	1,000,000^{‡}
^{‡} Sales+streaming figures based on certification alone.

== Release history ==
Release dates and formats
Region	Date	Format	Version	Label	Ref.
Various	August 27, 2025	Digital download; streaming	Original; instrumental	Republic	
Various	November 21, 2025	7-inch vinyl	Original; instrumental	Republic	
