= KPop Demon Hunters (soundtrack) =

2025 American film soundtrack

KPop Demon Hunters (Soundtrack from the Netflix Film)
- Standard cover

Soundtrack album by KPop Demon Hunters Cast, Saja Boys, Huntrix
- Released: June 20, 2025
- Genres: K-pop; electropop; pop
- Length: 37:50
- Languages: English; Korean
- Labels: Republic; Visva
- Producers: 24; Jenna Andrews; Dominsuk; Earattack; Ian Eisendrath; Ido; Jo Gap-chul; Kang Joon-woo; Stephen Kirk; Lindgren; Boy Matthews; MeloMance; Teddy Park; Cleo Tighe

Sony Pictures Animation chronology
Metro Boomin Presents Spider-Man: Across the Spider-Verse (Soundtrack from and Inspired by the Motion Picture) (2023)	KPop Demon Hunters (Score from the Netflix Film) (2025)	Fixed (Soundtrack from the Netflix Film) (2025)

Alternative cover
- Deluxe version cover

Singles from KPop Demon Hunters (Soundtrack from the Netflix Film)
- 1. "Takedown (Twice version)" Released: June 20, 2025; 2. "Golden" Released: July 4, 2025; 3. "How It's Done" Released: January 13, 2026

The soundtrack for the 2025 American animated musical urban fantasy film KPop Demon Hunters, produced by Sony Pictures Animation, consists of a soundtrack album from various artists and an original score composed by Brazilian composer Marcelo Zarvos. The soundtrack album was released on June 20, 2025, in conjunction with the film's release under the title KPop Demon Hunters (Soundtrack from the Netflix Film) under the Republic Records label, while Zarvos' score was released on December 19, 2025, as KPop Demon Hunters (Score from the Netflix Film) on the Netflix Music label.

It became the first film soundtrack on the Billboard Hot 100 to have four of its songs in the top ten simultaneously and was certified double Platinum by the Recording Industry Association of America (RIAA) in October 2025. It received five Grammy Award nominations, winning Best Song Written for Visual Media for "Golden", which was the first Grammy win for a K-pop song. It also won the Academy Award for Best Original Song (also for "Golden") at the 98th Academy Awards.

== Soundtrack ==
The soundtrack album for KPop Demon Hunters was released through Republic Records on June 20, 2025, the same day as the film. It was preceded by Twice's version of "Takedown", performed by Twice members Jeongyeon, Jihyo, and Chaeyoung, as the lead single. On July 4, 2025, Republic Records released "Golden" as a single along with a three-track bundle that also includes the instrumental and a cappella versions. It was performed by Ejae, Audrey Nuna, and Rei Ami as Huntrix. A third single, "How It's Done", was released on August 27, 2025.

The soundtrack features nine original songs written by Danny Chung, Ido, Vince, Kush, Ejae, Jenna Andrews, Stephen Kirk, Lindgren, Mark Sonnenblick, and Daniel Rojas, with production by Teddy Park, 24, Ido, Dominsuk, Andrews, Kirk, Lindgren, and Ian Eisendrath. The performers were credited under the names of Huntrix and the Saja Boys, as the characters' respective groups. It also includes three previous releases: "Strategy" by Twice, "Love, Maybe" by MeloMance, and "Path" by Jokers. On September 5, 2025, a deluxe version of the soundtrack album was released, featuring the additional tracks "Prologue (Hunter's Mantra)" and "Jinu's Lament", along with sing-along, instrumental, and a cappella versions of the film's songs. On November 7, 2025, a Brazilian Portuguese edition of the soundtrack was released, featuring versions of the songs used in the Brazilian dub of the film.

=== Background ===
For the film's music, co-directors Maggie Kang and Chris Appelhans considered K-pop as an integral genre for selecting the musical tone. Kang explained that during the film's development they decided it was not "a traditional musical, where characters break into song to express their feelings", and instead the film would have "pockets of music threaded throughout the film, and that felt like an organic way to push the story forward. But as we kept developing the film, we realized, Oh, no—this is a real musical. Even though the characters aren't exactly singing their feelings, every lyric had to serve the story and reveal something about them or advance the plot". When comparing the songs of Huntrix and the Saja Boys, Appelhans explained they "wanted the Saja Boys' songs to be super catchy, but slightly hollow, like there's no real soul underneath" which contrasts with the "emotionally vulnerable and honest" Huntrix songs – "the idea was that the surface-level part of your heart might be obsessed with the boys, but the deeper part is moved by the girls".

They enlisted an array of music producers to work on "chart-worthy K-pop tracks" including Teddy Park, co-founder of The Black Label, along with Grammy-nominated and winning producers Lindgren, Stephen Kirk, and Jenna Andrews, who had worked on music for K-pop artists such as BTS, Twice, and Blackpink amongst others. Ian Eisendrath served as the executive music producer, who noted "I've always thought of K-pop as the most theatrical genre of pop, and so I was just instantly excited by the possibilities of what could happen in a narrative context with the K-pop songs [and] incorporating actual, hit-making K-pop artists. I just felt like everything was really set up to be a special musical and narrative experience." All the songs were written and recorded before being integrated into the narrative, while Eisendrath also wanted them to be standalone records as well.

=== Songs ===
The first song, "How It's Done", introduces the members of Huntrix: Rumi (Arden Cho; singing voice Ejae), Mira (May Hong; singing voice Audrey Nuna), and Zoey (Ji-young Yoo; singing voice Rei Ami) as the girl-group Huntrix. The team took inspiration from "Jet Song" from West Side Story, which introduced the Jets, and wanted a similar introduction for the fictional band. Eisendrath wanted to set up a unique sonic world for the band, and the characters have distinctive voices. The team went through several iterations on finding the beat and tempo.

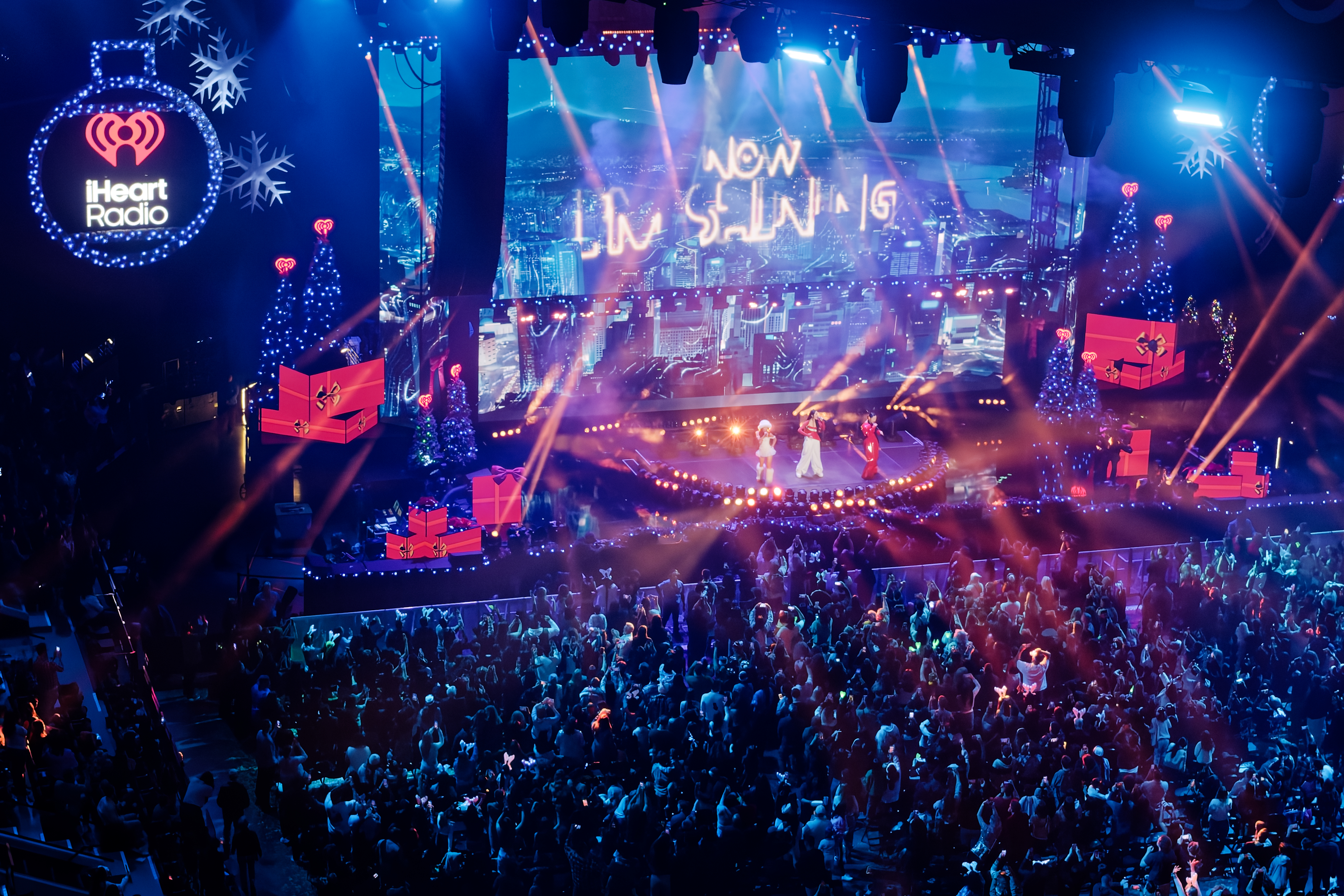
From left to right, the Huntrix singers Rei Ami, Ejae, and Audrey Nuna performing "Golden" at the 2025 KIIS-FM Jingle Ball.

The song "Golden" introduces the idea of the Golden Honmoon, where the principal characters work to protect the world from demons by sealing their universe off from the supernatural beings; Eisendrath described it as the "I Want" song in traditional music structure, as it explores the characters' purpose, while also dwells on Rumi's inner thoughts, resulting in the change of an "inspirational pop" to a bit darker genre. Appelhans explained that with "Golden" the characters' "gold costumes represent their kind of MacGuffin of a dream that they're chasing of being perfect and beyond reproach". However, at the second act's end, the ideal is visually represented as broken with the dream "literally and physically in tatters" – "the idea that we could service the way that K-pop works, and all the ingredients, but also make it part of this fantasy plot, was really fun". After the release of the film, Appelhans commented that with "Golden" as an "I Want" song they were following "the conventions of a traditional musical" while also "making it a legitimately great pop song" which "is probably why it's [in the Top 10] on the worldwide Spotify charts", noting that "a good pop song also tells a story" which is what "Golden" is doing.

"Soda Pop" is the introduction number for the Saja Boys, which was described as a "super bubblegum-y K-pop boy band song" similar to BTS' "Butter". Eisendrath said, "It's the demons who are evil, but they decide to masquerade as a K-pop boy group, and just be the most appealing, innocent, charming people that have ever been seen performing a K-pop song". The song "may sound like a sweet declaration of puppy love", however, "a deeper listen reveals the demons' true predatory nature" as the demons are there to prey on human souls. Danny Chung provided rap verses in the mid portions of the song.

"Takedown" was considered as a "warrior anthem" expressing their rage and vengeance against the Saja Boys. An end credits version of the song is performed by Jeongyeon, Jihyo and Chaeyoung of the girl group Twice, and is the centerpiece of their TikTok dance challenge.

"Free" is an emotional ballad that explores Jinu (Ahn Hyo-seop; singing voice Andrew Choi) and Rumi sharing their deepest secrets, serving as a musical picture of what they want to be in their lives.

"Your Idol" presents Gwi-Ma (Lee Byung-hun), the king of demons, as the Saja Boys team up with him, to perform a "dark, otherworldly number" in contrast to "Soda Pop". According to Ejae, who wrote the song, she was inspired by Exo's "Mama" and Christian hymns in writing the song.

"What It Sounds Like" is the final song that serves to introduce the conclusion to the final battle against Gwi-Ma and the Saja Boys; while being an "inspirational pop song", it also dwells on Rumi's journey battling her inner demons. Kang commented that when developing the song and Rumi's story they "talked a lot about mixed heritage" as well as "queer identity, and addiction and falling back into addiction. We kind of described the "demon part of you" where someone is hiding part of themselves "from the world". The team was inspired by "Green Light" from Lorde, as both songs are about accepting hurt and learning to move on. "Hide and Seek" from Imogen Heap was also an influence on the song due to its vocoder vocals and similar theme of finding true identity. A previous iteration of the song, titled "Kaleidoscope", focused on "taking all the pieces of yourself and making it beautiful". However, they felt "earlier versions of the song didn't ring true because the narrative was wrapped up too neatly" and what remains of "Kaleidoscope" are the lyrics on "broken pieces and finding yourself within those broken pieces" in "What It Sounds Like".

The film's soundtrack includes three previous releases, featuring "Strategy" by Twice, "Love, Maybe" by MeloMance, and "Path" by Jokers. Also included on the soundtrack is an instrumental "Score Suite", featuring excerpts from the film's orchestral score by Marcelo Zarvos.

==== Deluxe version tracks ====
"Prologue (Hunter's Mantra)" is the opening piece of the film's score, composed by Marcelo Zarvos, and featuring vocals by Ejae. The piece combines elements pulled from traditional Korean music, including from pansori and the folk song "Arirang", with "modern pop sensibilities". Ejae, commenting on her performance on the piece, said that she "wanted to bring Korea's rich traditional sounds into the music with [her] own twist".

"Jinu's Lament" is a short song, performed mostly in spoken word, that both introduces Jinu and details the decline of Gwi-Ma's power preceding the events of the film. The song is performed by Jinu's voice actor Ahn Hyo-seop, rather than Jinu's singing voice Andrew Choi.

==== Additional music ====
"Love Me Right" by Exo is featured in the movie, but is not included in the soundtrack album. During the film's development, "Love Me Right" and "Love, Maybe" were originally included as "temp tracks during the animatic phase". Kang explained that "Love Me Right" was in the "first version of" the Saja Boys' introduction scene and while they had discussed creating "an original track, [...] ultimately, nothing fit quite like that Exo song". Appelhans commented that, after years of using these songs as temporary tracks, "these two songs stuck" because they "carried the tone perfectly" so the team "fought to license them".

==== Cover versions ====
"Golden" has received multiple cover recordings, released via YouTube, by numerous K-pop artists, including by An Yu-jin, Bada, Lee Hae-ri, Kwon Jin-ah, Kwon Soon-il, and Jung Eun-ji. The song has also been performed live by the group Babymonster at the 2025 MAMA Awards, and by Katherine Jenkins at the 2025 Royal Variety Performance, accompanied by solo piano and orchestra. In January 2026, Kelly Clarkson released a cover version of "What It Sounds Like".

=== Track listing ===
Credits adapted from Tidal.

KPop Demon Hunters (Soundtrack from the Netflix Film) track listing
No.	Title	Writer(s)	Producer(s)	Length
1.	"Takedown" (Twice version: Jeongyeon, Jihyo and Chaeyoung)	Lindgren; Melanie Fontana	Lindgren; Ian Eisendrath	3:01
2.	"How It's Done" (Huntrix: Ejae, Audrey Nuna and Rei Ami)	Danny Chung; Ejae; Daniel Rojas; Mark Sonnenblick; 24; Ido; Teddy Park	24; Ido; Park; Eisendrath	2:56
3.	"Soda Pop" (Saja Boys: Andrew Choi, Neckwav, Danny Chung, Kevin Woo, SamUIL Lee)	Chung; Kush; Vince; 24; Dominsuk	24; Dominsuk; Eisendrath	2:30
4.	"Golden" (Huntrix)	Ejae; Sonnenblick; 24; Ido; Teddy Park	24; Ido; Park; Eisendrath	3:14
5.	"Strategy" (Twice)	Boy Matthews; Cleo Tighe; Earattack; Lee Woo-hyun	Lee; Earattack^{[p]}	2:48
6.	"Takedown" (Huntrix)	Lindgren; Fontana	Lindgren; Eisendrath	3:02
7.	"Your Idol" (Saja Boys)	Ejae; Kush; Sonnenblick; Vince; 24; Ido	24; Ido; Eisendrath	3:11
8.	"Free" (Ejae as Rumi, Andrew Choi as Jinu)	Jenna Andrews; Stephen Kirk; Sonnenblick	Andrews; Kirk; Eisendrath	3:07
9.	"What It Sounds Like" (Huntrix)	Ejae; Andrews; Kirk; Sonnenblick; Rojas; 24; Ido; Park	Andrews; Kirk; Eisendrath	4:10
10.	"Love, Maybe (사랑인가 봐)" (MeloMance)	Kim Min-seok; Jeong Dong-hwan	MeloMance	3:05
11.	"Path (오솔길)" (Jokers)	Jang Woon-beom; Kang Joon-woo; Jo Gap-chui; Kim Young-hyeon; Lee Soo-young	Jokers	3:41
12.	"Score Suite"	Marcelo Zarvos; Rojas; Ejae; Sonnenblick	Zarvos	3:00
Total length:				37:50

==== Deluxe version ====
Credits adapted from Tidal.

Disc one
No.	Title	Writer(s)	Producer(s)	Length
1.	"Prologue (Hunter's Mantra)" (Ejae)	Rojas; Ejae; Zarvos; Sonnenblick	Eisendrath; Zarvos	1:36
2.	"Jinu's Lament" (Ahn Hyo-seop as Jinu)	Rojas; Sonnenblick	Eisendrath	0:46
3.	"How It's Done" (Huntrix)	Danny Chung; Ejae; Rojas; Sonnenblick; 24; Ido; Park	24; Ido; Park; Eisendrath	2:56
4.	"Soda Pop" (Saja Boys)	Chung; Kush; Vince; 24; Dominsuk	24; Dominsuk; Eisendrath	2:30
5.	"Golden" (Huntrix)	Ejae; Sonnenblick; 24; Ido; Park	24; Ido; Park; Eisendrath	3:14
6.	"Strategy" (Twice)	Matthews; Tighe; Earattack; Lee Woo-hyun	Lee; Earattack^{[p]}	2:48
7.	"Takedown" (Huntrix)	Lindgren; Fontana	Lindgren; Eisendrath	3:02
8.	"Your Idol" (Saja Boys)	Ejae; Kush; Sonnenblick; Vince; 24; Ido	24; Ido; Eisendrath	3:11
9.	"Free" (Ejae as Rumi, Andrew Choi as Jinu)	Andrews; Kirk; Sonnenblick	Andrews; Kirk; Eisendrath	3:07
10.	"What It Sounds Like" (Huntrix)	Ejae; Andrews; Kirk; Sonnenblick; Rojas; 24; Ido; Park	Andrews; Kirk; Eisendrath	4:10
11.	"Love, Maybe (사랑인가 봐)" (MeloMance)	Kim Min-seok; Jeong	MeloMance	3:05
12.	"Path (오솔길)" (Jokers)	Jang; Kang; Jo; Kim Young-hyeon; Lee Soo-young	Jokers	3:41
13.	"Takedown" (Twice version: Jeongyeon, Jihyo and Chaeyoung)	Lindgren; Fontana	Lindgren; Eisendrath	3:01
14.	"Score Suite"	Zarvos; Rojas; Ejae; Sonnenblick	Zarvos	3:00
Total length:				40:12

Disc two
No.	Title	Writer(s)	Producer(s)	Length
1.	"How It's Done" (Sing-Along)	Chung; Ejae; Rojas; Sonnenblick; 24; Ido; Park	24; Ido; Park; Eisendrath	2:56
2.	"Soda Pop" (Sing-Along)	Chung; Kush; Vince; 24; Dominsuk	24; Dominsuk; Eisendrath	2:30
3.	"Golden" (Sing-Along)	Ejae; Sonnenblick; 24; Ido; Teddy Park	24; Ido; Park; Eisendrath	3:14
4.	"Takedown" (Sing-Along)	Lindgren; Fontana	Lindgren; Eisendrath	3:02
5.	"Your Idol" (Sing-Along)	Ejae; Kush; Sonnenblick; Vince; 24; Ido	24; Ido; Eisendrath	3:11
6.	"Free" (Sing-Along)	Andrews; Kirk; Sonnenblick	Andrews; Kirk; Eisendrath	3:07
7.	"What It Sounds Like" (Sing-Along)	Ejae; Andrews; Kirk; Sonnenblick; Rojas; 24; Ido; Park	Andrews; Kirk; Eisendrath	4:10
8.	"How It's Done" (Instrumental)	Chung; Ejae; Rojas; Sonnenblick; 24; Ido; Park	24; Ido; Park; Eisendrath	2:56
9.	"Soda Pop" (Instrumental)	Chung; Kush; Vince; 24; Dominsuk	24; Dominsuk; Eisendrath	2:30
10.	"Golden" (Instrumental)	Ejae; Sonnenblick; 24; Ido; Teddy Park	24; Ido; Park; Eisendrath	3:14
11.	"Takedown" (Instrumental)	Lindgren; Fontana	Lindgren; Eisendrath	3:02
12.	"Your Idol" (Instrumental)	Ejae; Kush; Sonnenblick; Vince; 24; Ido	24; Ido; Eisendrath	3:11
13.	"Free" (Instrumental)	Andrews; Kirk; Sonnenblick	Andrews; Kirk; Eisendrath	3:07
14.	"What It Sounds Like" (Instrumental)	Ejae; Andrews; Kirk; Sonnenblick; Rojas; 24; Ido; Park	Andrews; Kirk; Eisendrath	4:10
15.	"How It's Done" (Acapella)	Chung; Ejae; Sonnenblick; 24; Ido; Park	24; Ido; Park; Eisendrath	2:52
16.	"Soda Pop" (Acapella)	Chung; Kush; Vince; 24; Dominsuk	24; Dominsuk; Eisendrath	2:21
17.	"Golden" (Acapella)	Ejae; Sonnenblick; 24; Ido; Teddy Park	24; Ido; Park; Eisendrath	3:12
18.	"Takedown" (Acapella)	Lindgren; Fontana	Lindgren; Eisendrath	3:02
19.	"Your Idol" (Acapella)	Ejae; Kush; Sonnenblick; Vince; 24; Ido	24; Ido; Eisendrath	3:11
20.	"Free" (Acapella)	Andrews; Kirk; Sonnenblick	Andrews; Kirk; Eisendrath	2:54
21.	"What It Sounds Like" (Acapella)	Ejae; Andrews; Kirk; Sonnenblick; Rojas; 24; Ido; Park	Andrews; Kirk; Eisendrath	4:01
Total length:				1:05:55

Notes

- ^{^[p]} denotes a primary and vocal producer.

=== Personnel ===
Credits adapted from Tidal.

Musicians
- Huntrix – vocals (tracks 2, 4, 6, 9)
  - Ejae – vocals (tracks 2, 4, 6, 8, 9)
  - Audrey Nuna – vocals (tracks 2, 4, 6, 9)
  - Rei Ami – vocals (tracks 2, 4, 6, 9)
- Saja Boys – vocals (tracks 3, 7)
  - Andrew Choi – vocals (tracks 3, 7–8)
  - Neckwav – vocals (tracks 3, 7)
  - Danny Chung – vocals (tracks 3, 7)
  - Kevin Woo – vocals (tracks 3, 7)
  - SamUIL Lee – vocals (tracks 3, 7)
- Twice – vocals (tracks 1, 5), background vocals (track 5)
  - Jeongyeon – vocals (tracks 1, 5)
  - Jihyo – vocals (tracks 1, 5)
  - Chaeyoung – vocals (tracks 1, 5)
- MeloMance – vocals (track 10)
- Jokers – vocals (track 11)
- Marcelo Zarvos – vocals (track 12)
- Shorelle – background vocals (track 5)
- Jenna Andrews – background vocals (tracks 8–9)
- Stephen Kirk – background vocals, bass, drum programming, guitar, keyboard, strings (tracks 8–9)
- Luke Kim – guitar (track 5)
Technical
- KayOne – digital editing (tracks 1, 5–6)
- Dave Kutch – mastering (tracks 2–4, 7–9, 12)
- Kwon Nam-woo – mastering (tracks 1, 5–6)
- Curtis Douglas – mix engineering (tracks 2–4, 6–9), vocal mixing (tracks 1, 6)
- Lee Tae-sub – mix engineering (tracks 1, 5)
- Erich Talaba – mix engineering (track 12)
  - Matthew Tung – mixing (track 12)
  - Maximo Abraham – mixing and recording (track 12)
  - Thea Prevalsky – mixing (track 12)
- Kim Dae-sung – vocal mixing (track 10)
- Hyejin Choi – recording (tracks 1, 6)
- Andy Dudman – strings engineering (tracks 1–4, 6–9), recording (track 12)
- Derik Lee – vocal engineering (tracks 1–4, 6–9)
- Noah Hubbell – vocal engineering (tracks 2–4, 7, 9)
- Kyung-hoon Shin – vocal engineering (track 3, 7)
- Lim Chan-mi – recording (track 5)
- Seo Eun-il – recording (track 5)
- Earattack – recording and vocal production (track 5)
- Lawrence Manchester – recording (track 12)
- Nick Taylor – recording (track 12)
- Cris Avila – sound editing (track 12)

=== Release ===
==== Formats ====
Release history and formats for KPop Demon Hunters (Soundtrack from the Netflix Film)
Region	Initial release date	Edition	Format(s)	Label(s)	Ref.
Various	June 20, 2025	Standard	CD; LP; digital download; streaming	Republic Records; Visva	
Various	September 5, 2025	Deluxe	Digital download; streaming	Republic Records; Visva	
Various	November 7, 2025	Brazilian Portuguese	Digital download; streaming	Republic Records; Visva	

== Score ==
KPop Demon Hunters (Score from the Netflix Film)

Film score by Marcelo Zarvos
- Released: December 19, 2025
- Length: 34:10
- Label: Netflix

Marcelo Zarvos chronology
Nonnas (2025)	KPop Demon Hunters (Score from the Netflix Film) (2025)

Sony Pictures Animation chronology
Spider-Man: Across the Spider-Verse (Original Score) (2023)	KPop Demon Hunters (Score from the Netflix Film) (2025)	Fixed (Soundtrack from the Netflix Film) (2025)

Brazilian composer Marcelo Zarvos composed the film score for KPop Demon Hunters, which was released on December 19, 2025, by Netflix Music.

=== Track listing ===
Credits adapted from Tidal.

No.	Title	Length
1.	"Prologue"	1:36
2.	"Rumi's Signs"	2:30
3.	"Demons on a Plane"	0:50
4.	"Bathhouse Fight"	2:13
5.	"Jinu's Story"	2:00
6.	"Underworld"	1:32
7.	"Rumi Meets Derpy"	0:53
8.	"Listen to These Voices"	0:54
9.	"Bracelet"	1:42
10.	"Fans' Choice Awards"	1:12
11.	"The Disaster"	0:55
12.	"You're a Demon"	3:49
13.	"We Both Win / Flying with Derpy"	1:12
14.	"Rumi Confronts Celine"	3:16
15.	"Jinu's Death"	2:46
16.	"End Credits Suite"	6:50
Total length:		34:10

=== Personnel ===
Credits adapted from Tidal.

Technical

- Marcelo Zarvos – composer, piano
- Reuben Cohen – mastering
- Erich Talaba – mix engineering

== Reception ==
=== Critical reception ===
The soundtrack received widespread critical acclaim. Jason Lipshutz of Billboard explained that the Saja Boys and Huntrix could "become breakout stars of the summer" as the "chart launches look like the quiet beginning of a full-blown cultural phenomenon", noting that "all of the KPop Demon Hunters music is enjoying an uptick in streams during its second week of release". Lipshutz highlighted that "'Golden' and 'Your Idol' appear to be the standout songs so far" in terms of streaming numbers, however, "soundtrack cuts like 'What It Sounds Like' and 'Free' have also tripled up their streaming totals from their first week of release to their second, and also posted significant increases in song sale totals". Reviewing the soundtrack for the music database AllMusic, Neil Z. Yeung gave it 4 out of 5 stars and stated that singers in Huntrix and Saja Boys "do such a good job that they might as well be in K-pop groups in real life too," adding that tracks by Huntrix and Saja Boys are "top-tier pop gems, amplified even more if listeners have seen the movie". Katcy Stephan of Variety commented that Huntrix has "quickly become the third most-streamed K-Pop group in the world", noting that they were "bested only by juggernauts BTS and Stray Kids". Nick Romano of Entertainment Weekly highlighted the two fictional bands "seem to be taking over the world" which is significant because "technically" these "artists are not real". Peter Hoskins, for the BBC, commented that "its success should perhaps not be too surprising as top producers including Teddy Park, who has worked with Blackpink, and BTS collaborator Lindgren were part of the team that created the album". Erielle Sudario of Collider commented that Huntrix is not "the first fictional K-pop group to go viral", highlighting other fictional K-pop groups such as K/DA, Red Queen, and Boys Generally Asian. She opined "despite their popularity and success, one major downside of supporting a fictional K-pop group is that they tend to have a short shelf life".

Angela Garcia of SLUG Magazine commented that "the songs aren't just homages to K-pop; they are K-pop". Garcia highlighted that the soundtrack is "a love letter to K-pop", noting "obvious highlights include 'Golden' and 'Your Idol.' Full of energy and infectious melodies, at least one of these tracks is guaranteed to stick in your head–no matter how much you fight it". Sudario explained "fictional K-pop groups have become successful not only because of the genre's rise, but also because the people behind them conducted massive research before their launch" and they "feature singing voices of actual artists". Crystal Bell of Mashable attributed part of the Huntrix success to Ejae "who provides Rumi's singing voice and helped pen many of the film's original tracks" as "her involvement brings a layer of authenticity to the film's sound, blurring the line between fiction and reality". Bell also highlighted that Audrey Nuna and Rei Ami, as Mira and Zoey's respective singing voices, "bring their own vocal flair to the film's genre-hopping tracks". Trent Cannon of PopVerse stated that "probably the highest praise I can give the music in KPop Demon Hunters" is "it feels like a great KPop album. From start to finish, it is filled with great songs and showcases why Korea has become a focal point for pop music in recent years". Cannon explained that the music is "believably great", highlighting "Takedown" as a "fast, aggressive song" which "leans heavily on the hip-hop influences that permeate through KPop and wouldn't feel out of place on a TWICE record itself" while "How It's Done" is a song that "would absolutely be at home on a Blackpink album" and "Soda Pop" which "feels very much like BTS" song. Bell opined that "Golden" and "Takedown" would not "feel out of place on a real idol group's comeback album, with propulsive beats, dynamic hooks, and lyrics that tap into both the emotional highs and warrior-like tenacity of being an idol". Wilson Chapman of IndieWire commented that he did not think the soundtrack was "a full collection of bangers". He opined that "How It's Done" and "Your Idol" are slightly "generic and blend together too easily", however, these songs are also "eminently believable as real K-pop songs you can stream in the real world, and the highlights – including Saja Boys bouncy intro number 'Soda Pop' and Huntr/x's big inspirational ballad 'Golden' – are spectacular".

Romano stated that "the success of the KPop Demon Hunters soundtrack is a credit to how Kang and Appelhans took the musical elements quite seriously, assembling a team capable of composing songs that could rival the great K-pop hits of today". Stephan opined that it is "impossible to extricate the success of KPop Demon Hunters from its no-skip soundtrack, featuring instant hits that seamlessly combine K-Pop style with musical theater-like storytelling reminiscent of Alan Menken's best work at Disney". Jesse Hassenger of Decider compared KPop Demon Hunters to Disney musicals, noting that "an upstart cartoon musical doing this well is virtually unheard-of". While Hassenger commented that the film's K-pop songs did not rise to "'Bruno'-level masters of the movie-musical form", he praised the film for rethinking "how to use music in family-friendly feature animation" which is a quality he felt was lacking in recent Disney musicals. Hassenger also felt that the soundtrack "distinguishes" itself "from the grown-up hustle of soundtracks so concerned with maximizing their chart impact that they have almost nothing to do with the movies themselves" such as the recent soundtrack for the film F1 (2025).

=== Accolades ===
Year	Award	Category	Work	Result	Ref.
2025	K-World Dream Awards	Best OST	"Golden"	Won	
2025	K-World Dream Awards	Best OST	"Soda Pop"	Nominated	
2025	MTV Video Music Awards	Song of Summer	"Golden"	Nominated	
2025	Korea Grand Music Awards	Best Virtual Artist	"Golden"	Nominated	
2025	Korea Grand Music Awards	Best Virtual Artist	"Soda Pop"	Nominated	
2025	MAMA Awards	Best OST	"Golden"	Won	
2025	MAMA Awards	Best OST	"Soda Pop"	Nominated	
2025	MAMA Awards	Music Visionary of the Year	KPop Demon Hunters	Won	
2025	MAMA Awards	Song of the Year	"Golden"	Nominated	
2025	MAMA Awards	Song of the Year	"Soda Pop"	Nominated	
2025	NRJ Music Awards	Social Hit	"Golden" (David Guetta Remix)	Won	
2025	Hollywood Music in Media Awards	Song – Animated Film	"Golden"	Won	
2025	Hollywood Music in Media Awards	Song – Onscreen Performance (Film)	"Golden"	Nominated	
2025	Hollywood Music in Media Awards	Soundtrack Album	KPop Demon Hunters	Nominated	
2025	St. Louis Film Critics Association Awards	Best Music Soundtrack	KPop Demon Hunters	Nominated	
2025	RTHK International Pop Poll Awards	Top Ten International Gold Songs	"Golden" (David Guetta Remix)	Won	
2025	Asia Artist Awards	Best OST	"Golden"	Won	
2025	Melon Music Awards	Song of the Year	"Golden"	Nominated	
2025	Melon Music Awards	Best OST	"Golden"	Won	
2025	Las Vegas Film Critics Society	Best Song	"Golden"	Nominated	
2025	Georgia Film Critics Association	Best Original Song	"Golden"	Runner-up	
2025	New Jersey Film Critics Circle	Best Original Song	"Golden"	Won	
2025	New Mexico Film Critics Association Awards	Best Original Song	"Golden"	Runner-up	
2026	Academy Awards	Best Original Song	"Golden"	Won	
2026	American Cinematheque	Tribute to the Crafts Feature Film Song	"Golden"	Honored	
2026	American Music Awards	Song of the Year	"Golden"	Won	
2026	American Music Awards	Best Pop Song	"Golden"	Won	
2026	American Music Awards	Best Vocal Performance	"Golden"	Won	
2026	American Music Awards	Best Soundtrack	KPop Demon Hunters	Won	
2026	Annie Awards	Best Music – Feature	KPop Demon Hunters Music Team	Won	
2026	ASCAP Pop Music Awards	Songwriter Award	"Golden"	Honored	
2026	Astra Film Awards	Best Original Song	"Golden"	Won	
2026	Brit Awards	International Song of the Year	"Golden"	Nominated	
2026	Capri Hollywood International Film Festival	Best Original Song	"Golden"	Won	
2026	Critics Association Of Central Florida	Best Original Song	"Golden"	Won	
2026	Chicago Indie Critics	Best Original Song	"Golden"	Nominated	
2026	Critics' Choice Movie Awards	Best Song	"Golden"	Won	
2026	Denver Film Critics Society	Best Song	"Golden"	Won	
2026	DiscussingFilm's Global Film Critics Awards	Best Original Song	"Golden"	Won	
2026	Dorian Award	Film Music of the Year	KPop Demon Hunters – Marcelo Zarvos, EJAE, Mark Sonnenblick, Danny Chung, Vince, Kush, Lindgren, Daniel Rojas, et al.	Nominated	
2026	Golden Globe Awards	Best Original Song – Motion Picture	"Golden"	Won	
2026	Gold Derby Film Awards	Best Original Song	"Golden"	Won	
2026	Grammy Awards	Song of the Year	"Golden"	Nominated	
2026	Grammy Awards	Best Pop Duo/Group Performance	"Golden"	Nominated	
2026	Grammy Awards	Best Song Written for Visual Media	"Golden"	Won	
2026	Grammy Awards	Best Compilation Soundtrack for Visual Media	KPop Demon Hunters	Nominated	
2026	Grammy Awards	Best Remixed Recording	"Golden" (David Guetta Remix)	Nominated	
2026	Hanteo Music Awards	Special Award – OST	Huntrix, Saja Boys, and KPop Demon Hunters Cast	Nominated	
2026	Houston Film Critics Society	Best Original Song	"Golden"	Won	
2026	iHeartRadio Music Awards	Pop Song of the Year	"Golden"	Nominated	
2026	iHeartRadio Music Awards	K-pop Song of the Year	"Golden"	Won	
2026	iHeartRadio Music Awards	Best Lyrics	"Golden"	Nominated	
2026	iHeartRadio Music Awards	Favorite Soundtrack	KPop Demon Hunters	Won	
2026	Japan Gold Disc Award	Song of the Year by Download (Asia)	"Golden"	Won	
2026	Japan Gold Disc Award	Song of the Year by Streaming (Asia)	"Golden"	Won	
2026	Latino Entertainment Journalists Association	Best Song	"Golden"	Won	
2026	Advanced Imaging Society Lumiere Awards	Best Original Song	"Golden"	Won	
2026	MPSE Golden Reel Awards	Music Editing – Feature Motion Picture	KPop Demon Hunters	Nominated	
2026	Minnesota Film Critics Association	Best Music	KPop Demon Hunters	Nominated	
2026	MTV Video Music Awards	Song of the year	"Golden"	Nominated	
2026	Music Awards Japan	Best Song Asia	"Golden"	Won	
2026	Music Awards Japan	Best International Pop Song in Japan	"Golden"	Nominated	
2026	Music Awards Japan	International Song powered by Spotify	"Golden"	Nominated	
2026	Music Awards Japan	International Song powered by Spotify	"Soda Pop"	Nominated	
2026	Music Awards Japan	Song of the Year	"Golden"	Longlisted	
2026	Music Awards Japan	Best Anime Song	"Golden"	Longlisted	
2026	Music Awards Japan	Best Anime Song	"Soda Pop"	Longlisted	
2026	Music Awards Japan	Best K-Pop Song in Japan	"Golden"	Longlisted	
2026	Music Awards Japan	Best K-Pop Song in Japan	"Soda Pop"	Longlisted	
2026	Music City Film Critics Association	Best Original Song	"Golden"	Nominated	
2026	Music City Film Critics Association	Best Music Film	KPop Demon Hunters	Nominated	
2026	Nickelodeon Kids' Choice Awards	Favorite Song from a Movie	"Golden"	Won	
2026	North Carolina Film Critics Association	Best Original Song	"Golden"	Won	
2026	North Dakota Film Society	Best Original Song	"Golden"	Won	
2026	The Online Film & Television Association	Best Original Song	"Golden"	Runner-up	
2026	Pittsburgh Film Critics Association	Best Song	"Golden"	Runner-up	
2026	Puerto Rico Critics Association	Best original song	"Golden"	Won	
2026	Satellite Awards	Best Original Song	"Golden"	Nominated	
2026	SEC Awards	International Song of the Year	"Golden"	Nominated	
2026	Society of Composers & Lyricists Awards	Outstanding Original Song for a Comedy or Musical Visual Media Production	"Golden"	Won	
2026	Songwriters of North America	Global Impact Award	KPop Demon Hunters soundtrack – The Songwriting team	Honored	
2026	World Soundtrack Awards	Best Original Song	"Golden"	Won	

=== Commercial performance ===
In the United States, KPop Demon Hunters debuted at number eight on the Billboard 200 chart with 31,000 equivalent album units and landed at number 18 on the Top Album Sales chart with 3,000 sales. The album holds the highest debut on the Billboard 200 for soundtracks released in 2025 and is the first soundtrack of 2025 to reach the top ten. The album was also the highest-charting animated film's soundtrack album on the chart since Metro Boomin's Spider-Man: Across the Spider-Verse (2023) at number five, as well as the first Netflix soundtrack to reach number one on the Top Soundtracks in around two years. The following week, the album jumped up to number three on the Billboard 200 chart, becoming the highest-charting soundtrack of 2025. Billboard and NPR Music noted that for the Billboard Hot 100, seven songs were on the July 12-dated list with five debuting and two jumping up to the top 40. Additionally, six of those songs were "also on the Streaming Songs chart". In its twelfth week, the album reached number one on the Billboard 200, being the first animated film soundtrack to reach that position since Encanto in 2022.

The Korea Herald, while highlighting the soundtrack's debut on the Billboard charts, noted that the album "is making major waves on music charts worldwide" and "in South Korea, the response has been equally robust." The BBC highlighted that Huntrix and the Saja Boys–with "Golden" and "Your Idol" respectively–topped the US Spotify chart with Huntrix hitting "number two on the chart, surpassing Blackpink as the highest-charting female K-pop group", and the Saja Boys becoming "the highest charting male K-pop group in US Spotify history", surpassing BTS. Lipshutz explained that unlike animated musicals with "a standout song or two", the soundtrack for "KPop Demon Hunters is a phenomenon more reminiscent of 2021's Hot 100-blanketing Encanto soundtrack, with seven songs from the soundtrack appearing on this week's chart". Lipshutz commented that both "Golden" and "Your Idol" have been "near the top of daily U.S. and global streaming listings for days, but so have Huntrix's hammering opener 'How It's Done,' the sticky-sweet boy band song 'Soda Pop' and the pivotal ballad 'What It Sounds Like,' all of which are currently in the top 11 of Spotify's Daily Top Songs USA chart". Huntrix was "the first fictional act to reign" on the Billboard Global 200 and Billboard Global Excl. US when their song "Golden" rose to number one on both charts. Billboard commented that while Huntrix "outpaces its rival" the Saja Boys, the two songs by the KPop Demon Hunters boy band also hit "the top 10" of these two charts. On August 18, 2025, Billboard highlighted that the film's two fictional groups "team up to claim four of the top five on the Billboard Global 200 chart" and that only "four [other] elite albums", three by Taylor Swift and one by Drake, "have generated as many as four concurrent top five hits" on the Global 200 since the chart's debut in September 2020.

=== Charts ===
==== Weekly charts ====
Weekly chart performance for KPop Demon Hunters
Chart (2025–2026)	Peak position
Australian Albums (ARIA)	1
Austrian Albums (Ö3 Austria)	1
Belgian Albums (Ultratop Flanders)	1
Belgian Albums (Ultratop Wallonia)	1
Canadian Albums (Billboard)	1
Croatian International Albums (HDU)	12
Czech Albums (ČNS IFPI)	1
Danish Albums (Hitlisten)	1
Dutch Albums (Album Top 100)	1
Finnish Albums (Suomen virallinen lista)	3
French Albums (SNEP)	2
German Albums (Offizielle Top 100)	1
Greek Albums (IFPI)	2
Hungarian Albums (MAHASZ)	1
Icelandic Albums (Tónlistinn)	2
Irish Compilation Albums (IRMA)	1
Italian Albums (FIMI)	6
Japanese Combined Albums (Oricon)	16
Japanese Anime Albums (Oricon)	5
Japanese Western Albums (Oricon)	16
Japanese Hot Albums (Billboard Japan)	4
Lithuanian Albums (AGATA)	5
New Zealand Albums (RMNZ)	1
Nigerian Albums (TurnTable)	19
Norwegian Albums (IFPI Norge)	1
Polish Albums (ZPAV)	1
Portuguese Albums (AFP)	2
Slovak Albums (ČNS IFPI)	3
Spanish Albums (PROMUSICAE)	6
Swedish Albums (Sverigetopplistan)	1
Swiss Albums (Schweizer Hitparade)	1
UK Compilation Albums (Official Charts)	1
UK Soundtrack Albums (Official Charts)	1
US Billboard 200	1
US Top Soundtracks (Billboard)	1

==== Year-end charts ====
Year-end chart performance for KPop Demon Hunters
Chart (2025)	Position
Australian Albums (ARIA)	2
Austrian Albums (Ö3 Austria)	2
Belgian Albums (Ultratop Flanders)	5
Canadian Albums (Billboard)	15
Danish Albums (Hitlisten)	3
Dutch Albums (Album Top 100)	5
French Albums (SNEP)	13
German Albums (Offizielle Top 100)	3
Global Albums (IFPI)	3
Hungarian Albums (MAHASZ)	7
Icelandic Albums (Tónlistinn)	5
Italian Albums (FIMI)	47
New Zealand Albums (RMNZ)	1
Polish Albums (ZPAV)	14
Japanese Hot Albums (Billboard Japan)	22
Spanish Albums (PROMUSICAE)	16
Swedish Albums (Sverigetopplistan)	2
Swiss Albums (Schweizer Hitparade)	4
US Billboard 200	13
US Soundtrack Albums (Billboard)	1

=== Certifications and sales ===
Certifications for KPop Demon Hunters, with pure sales where available
Region	Certification	Certified units/sales
Australia (ARIA)	Gold	35,000^{‡}
Austria (IFPI Austria)	Platinum	15,000^{‡}
Canada (Music Canada)	3× Platinum	240,000^{‡}
Denmark (IFPI Danmark)	2× Platinum	40,000^{‡}
France (SNEP)	3× Platinum	300,000^{‡}
Iceland (FHF)	—	2,300
Italy (FIMI)	Platinum	50,000^{‡}
Mexico (AMPROFON)	Gold	70,000^{‡}
New Zealand (RMNZ)	4× Platinum	60,000^{‡}
Poland (ZPAV)	2× Platinum	60,000^{‡}
Portugal (AFP)	Platinum	7,000^{‡}
Spain (Promusicae)	Platinum	40,000^{‡}
Switzerland (IFPI Switzerland)	Gold	10,000^{‡}
United Kingdom (BPI)	2× Platinum	600,000^{‡}
United States (RIAA)	Platinum	366,111
^{‡} Sales+streaming figures based on certification alone.
