= What It Sounds Like =

2025 promotional single by Huntrix from KPop Demon Hunters

Promotional single by Huntrix

from the album KPop Demon Hunters
- Released: August 28, 2025
- Genre: Pop
- Length: 4:10
- Label: Republic; Visva
- Songwriters: Ejae; Daniel Rojas; Mark Sonnenblick; 24; Ido; Teddy
- Producers: Stephen Kirk; Jenna Andrews; Ian Eisendrath

Lyric video
- "What It Sounds Like" on YouTube

"What It Sounds Like" is a song performed by Ejae, Audrey Nuna, and Rei Ami as the fictional K-pop girl group Huntrix in the 2025 animated musical urban fantasy film KPop Demon Hunters. It was released on June 20, 2025, alongside the rest of the soundtrack album, and was released as a promotional single on August 28, 2025.

== Composition and release ==
The animated musical fantasy film KPop Demon Hunters was released on Netflix on June 20, 2025. The film follows the fictional K-pop girl group Huntrix, consisting of members Rumi, Mira, and Zoey, whose singing voices are performed by Ejae, Audrey Nuna, and Rei Ami, respectively. The film's accompanying soundtrack album was released on the same day, with "What It Sounds Like" as the ninth track.

It is the final song in the film that plays as Rumi arrives at Namsan Tower and breaks Mira and Zoey out of their trance, allowing them to reunite and defeat Gwi-Ma and the Saja Boys; while being an "inspirational pop song", it also dwells on Rumi's journey on battling her inner demons. The team of composers was inspired by "Green Light" from Lorde, as both songs are about accepting hurt and learning to move on. "Hide and Seek" from Imogen Heap was also an influence on the song due to its vocoder vocals and similar theme of finding true identity. A previous iteration of the song, titled "Kaleidoscope", focused on "taking all the pieces of yourself and making it beautiful". However, they felt "earlier versions of the song didn't ring true because the narrative was wrapped up too neatly" and what remains of "Kaleidoscope" are the lyrics on "broken pieces and finding yourself within those broken pieces" in "What It Sounds Like".

== Critical reception ==
"What It Sounds Like" received positive reviews from critics, with Billboard placing the song fifth in their rankings of the soundtrack and comparing to "Let It Go" and "How Far I'll Go". Likewise, Rolling Stone described the song as "dreamy yet powerful one that heals and inspires you to accept and embrace who you are."

== Commercial performance ==
"What It Sounds Like" debuted at #55 on the Billboard Hot 100, spending 13 consecutive weeks on the chart, peaking at #15 on its 12th.

"What It Sounds Like" debuted at #70 on the United Kingdom's Official Singles Chart. It spent six consecutive weeks on the chart, peaking at #13 three times.

On October 8, the Recording Industry Association of America awarded "What It Sounds Like" a platinum certification.

== Cover versions ==
Various artists have covered "What It Sounds Like", including Kelly Clarkson.

== Track listing ==
1. "What It Sounds Like" - 4:10
2. "What It Sounds Like (Inst.)" - 4:10

== Charts ==
=== Weekly charts ===
Weekly chart performance
Chart (2025–2026)	Peak position
Australia (ARIA)	8
Austria (Ö3 Austria Top 40)	18
Canada Hot 100 (Billboard)	15
Czech Republic Singles Digital (ČNS IFPI)	42
Denmark (Tracklisten)	40
El Salvador Anglo Airplay (Monitor Latino)	11
France (SNEP)	155
Germany (GfK)	15
Global 200 (Billboard)	7
Greece International (IFPI)	72
Hong Kong (Billboard)	22
Iceland (Tónlistinn)	15
Ireland (IRMA)	22
Malaysia (IFPI)	7
Malaysia International (RIM)	5
Netherlands (Single Top 100)	45
New Zealand (Recorded Music NZ)	7
Norway (IFPI Norge)	16
Philippines (IFPI)	20
Philippines Hot 100 (Billboard Philippines)	17
Poland (Polish Streaming Top 100)	73
Portugal (AFP)	66
Singapore (RIAS)	8
Slovakia Singles Digital (ČNS IFPI)	49
South Korea (Circle)	34
Sweden (Sverigetopplistan)	16
Switzerland (Schweizer Hitparade)	33
Taiwan (Billboard)	6
UK Singles (Official Charts)	13
US Billboard Hot 100	15

=== Monthly charts ===
Monthly chart performance
Chart (2025)	Peak position
South Korea (Circle)	37

=== Year-end charts ===
Year-end chart performance
Chart (2025)	Position
Australia (ARIA)	50
Canada (Canadian Hot 100)	58
Germany (GfK)	73
Global 200 (Billboard)	122
New Zealand (Recorded Music NZ)	39
Philippines (Philippines Hot 100)	88
South Korea (Circle)	176
US Billboard Hot 100	83

== Certifications ==
Certifications
Region	Certification	Certified units/sales
Australia (ARIA)	2× Platinum	140,000^{‡}
Belgium (BRMA)	Gold	20,000^{‡}
Brazil (Pro-Música Brasil)	2× Platinum	80,000^{‡}
Canada (Music Canada)	2× Platinum	160,000^{‡}
Denmark (IFPI Danmark)	Gold	45,000^{‡}
France (SNEP)	Gold	100,000^{‡}
Mexico (AMPROFON)	Gold	70,000^{‡}
New Zealand (RMNZ)	Platinum	30,000^{‡}
Poland (ZPAV)	Gold	62,500^{‡}
Portugal (AFP)	Gold	12,000^{‡}
Spain (Promusicae)	Gold	50,000^{‡}
Switzerland (IFPI Switzerland)	Gold	15,000^{‡}
United Kingdom (BPI)	Platinum	600,000^{‡}
United States (RIAA)	Platinum	1,000,000^{‡}
^{‡} Sales+streaming figures based on certification alone.
