= Dina LaPolt =

American entertainment lawyer and former musician

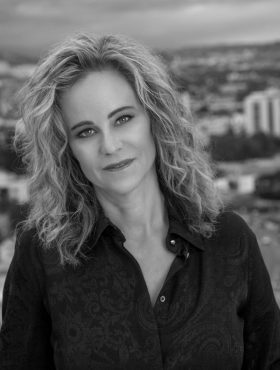
- Education: John F. Kennedy University
- Occupation: Entertainment Attorney
- Organization: LaPolt Law
- Known for: Entertainment Law and Activism
- Board member of: Songwriters of North America, City of Hope's Music, Film & Entertainment Industry Group, Neil Lasher Foundation, Songwriters of N. America (SONA), Executive Leadership Council of the Black Music Action Coalition (BMAC), Neil Lasher Music Fund, Recording Academy's Entertainment Lawyers' Initiative
- Website: lapoltlaw.com

Signature
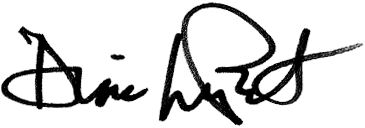

Dina LaPolt is an American entertainment lawyer and artist rights advocate based in Los Angeles, California. After an early career in the music industry, she became an entertainment lawyer in 1997. She is the founder and owner of LaPolt Law.

== Early life and education ==
LaPolt became an attorney in 1997 after being in the music industry from age 13. Formerly a musician, LaPolt performed in multiple rock bands on the East and West Coast (1980-1990s). LaPolt later became a club promoter and artist manager working for Streetgang Productions. She received her bachelor's degree in music from the State University of New York at New Paltz.

In 1991 LaPolt relocated from New York City to the San Francisco Bay Area, where she taught guitar lessons and played lead guitar in the all-female band Irresistible Impulse, named after the criminal law defense. The band became influential in the gay and lesbian club scene. LaPolt often used the stage to advocate for gay rights. In 1993, she enrolled in law school at John F. Kennedy University in Walnut Creek. Shortly after passing the California bar exam, LaPolt moved to Los Angeles in June 1997.

LaPolt has been sober since 1998. She has discussed her recovery in interviews and public appearances, describing it as an important influence on her personal life and professional development.

== Career ==
LaPolt's early entertainment law clients were Playboy Playmates including Carrie Stevens and Victoria Silvstedt. In 2001 she founded LaPolt Law, a Los Angeles-based law firm representing entertainers and entrepreneurs. LaPolt's client roster has included recording artists such as Steven Tyler, Britney Spears, Cardi B, 21 Savage, deadmau5, Joan Jett, Mary J. Blige, Tinashe, and Tyga.

=== Major cases ===
==== Afeni Shakur and Tupac Shakur’s Estate ====
Among LaPolt's earliest clients was the activist Afeni Shakur, mother of late rapper Tupac Shakur. From 1998 to 2010, LaPolt was the entertainment attorney for the Tupac Shakur estate, and served on the board of the Tupac Amaru Shakur Foundation and the Tupac Amaru Shakur Center for the Arts. Alongside Afeni Shakur, LaPolt oversaw the release of ten posthumous Tupac albums and several books, including The Rose That Grew from Concrete, 2Pac's Greatest Hits, Better Dayz, and Until the End of Time.

deadmau5

In 2013, LaPolt represented electronic producer deadmau5 in settling his trademark dispute with The Walt Disney Company regarding the registration of the artist's signature "mau5head" logo. Disney argued that Zimmerman's signature mau5head headgear and logo resembled their Mickey Mouse cartoon character, thus attempting to block his trademark registration.

==== Steven Tyler ====
In 2018 LaPolt took on The White House and for the second time shut down President Donald Trump for unlicensed use of her client, Steven Tyler's, music during Trump's rallies.

==== 21 Savage ====
In February 2019, LaPolt helped secure the release of her client, rapper 21 Savage (She'yaa Bin Abraham-Joseph) from U.S. Immigration and Customs Enforcement Detention after he was unfairly targeted by the Trump Administration due to his race and immigration status. On February 12, 2019, 21 Savage was released on bond.

=== Teaching and public speaking ===
In 2019, LaPolt became the youngest person and the second woman to receive The Recording Academy's Service Award at its annual Entertainment Law Initiative event. That same year she was inducted into Billboard's Women in Music Hall of Fame.

From 2002 to 2019, LaPolt taught "Legal and Practical Aspects of the Music Business” in the Entertainment Studies Department at UCLA Extension, and has taught and lectured throughout the U.S., Canada and Europe. She is the editor of the book, Building Your Artist's Brand as a Business, published in 2012 by the International Association of Entertainment Lawyers in Cannes, France.

=== Media ventures ===
In February 2025, LaPolt launched LaPolt Media, a media company focused on producing content related to entertainment, advocacy, and culture. The company's initial projects included her first motivational book, Street Smart: Succeeding in a Man's World, and the podcast The Stiletto Room, where she has interviewed Melissa Etheridge, Chaz Bono and Morgan Wade.

== Film and television ==
LaPolt served as an executive producer of the reality series on AXS TV called Real Money, chronicling her client Eddie Money and his family of seven. The show was released in April 2018, and ran for two seasons. LaPolt also was an associate producer on Becoming Chaz, a documentary released in 2011 discussing the gender transformation of Chaz Bono.

LaPolt was a co-producer of the Oscar-nominated 2003 documentary Tupac: Resurrection. In 2022, LaPolt was engaged by the Shakur estate to produce Peace, Love & Respect: The Afeni Shakur Story, chronicling the activist's work as a key figure in the Black Panther party.

== Advocacy ==
LaPolt has been involved in legislative advocacy efforts on behalf of the music community. In 2013, LaPolt helped write proposed legislation on the right of privacy for celebrities and other public figures in the state of Hawaii along with Senator Kalani English, D-Maui. The “Steven Tyler Act” passed through the state Senate with only one opposing vote. Although the measure failed in the House of Representatives two months later, the legislation stayed active for two years.

She has also submitted comment papers to the United States Patent and Trademark Office, the United States Copyright Office and Department of Justice on various legislative issues. In October 2015, LaPolt spoke in front of members of the U.S. House Judiciary Committee at UCLA as part of their ongoing review of copyright law.

In 2015, LaPolt helped found songwriter advocacy group the Songwriters of North America (SONA) with songwriters Michelle Lewis and Kay Hanley. SONA has grown to now include over 600 songwriters including Kara DioGuardi, Siedah Garrett, Justin Tranter, Mozella, Busbee, Priscilla Renea, Diane Warren, Claudia Brant, Steven Tyler, Joe Perry, Rick Nowels, Darrell Brown, Dave Bassett, and 21 Savage. LaPolt also serves as an attorney advisor to the GRAMMY Creators Alliance, announced during the 2015 GRAMMY Awards broadcast.

In 2016, orchestrated the filing of on behalf of the Songwriters of North America in connection with the DOJ's mandate requiring 100% licensing by each of the major Performing Rights Organizations.

In 2017, LaPolt worked with members of Congress to write and introduce the Music Modernization Act (MMA), which changed the way songwriters are paid for use of their works by streaming services. In April 2018, LaPolt was recognized on the floor of the U.S. House of Representatives by the MMA's author, Congressman Doug Collins, R-Ga., for her work spearheading the MMA. In September 2018, the Music Modernization Act was unanimously passed in the U.S. Senate.

In March 2020, again through the Songwriters of North America and as well as the Nashville Songwriters Association International, LaPolt was instrumental in advocating for independent contractors, sole proprietors, and the self employed to be added to the Federal Government's stimulus bill, the CARES Act, ensuring eligibility for artist's for federal relief during the COVID-19 pandemic. The revisions to the bill allowed coverage for songwriters, producers, and music artists, as well as others in the music industry, whose business was disrupted due to the Government's stay-at-home mandates.

LaPolt is also an active member on the Executive Leadership Council of the Black Music Action Coalition. In 2021, she was honored for her activism in the Black community as the recipient of The Black Music Action Coalition's Agent of Change Award alongside civil rights attorney Benjamin Crump.

In September 2022, working alongside Congressman Hank Johnson and Congressman Jamaal Bowman, LaPolt helped to develop new Federal legislation, the Restoring Artistic Protection (RAP) Act to the US House of Representatives. The RAP Act “[protects] artist from the use of their lyrics against them as legal evidence in criminal and civil cases,” and is the first of its kind at the federal level. The act is a layer of protection for the hip-hop genre in particular, a sector of music that LaPolt says the courts “fundamentally misunderstand” due to underlying racial prejudices. The California version of the bill, the Decriminalizing Artistic Expression Act, was signed into California law by Governor Gavin Newsom on October 1, 2022.

== Publications ==
- Building Your Artist's Brand as a Business (editor)
- Keeping It Honest: Transparency and Legal Issues in the Entertainment Industry
- Street Smart: Succeeding in a Man's World (author)

== Awards and honors ==
- 2019 - Recording Academy Service Award
- 2019 - Billboard Women in Music Hall of Fame
- 2022 - Friendly House Visionary Award
- 2023 - Thomas J. Moran Caron Music Award
- 2024 - Billboard Top Music Lawyers' Choice Award
- 2025 - SONA Warrior Award
