= Huntrix =

Fictional K-Pop band

- The Huntrix members, from left to right: Zoey, Rumi, and Mira.

Background information
- Origin: KPop Demon Hunters
- Genres: K-pop; electropop
- Years active: 2025–present
- Label: Republic
- Members: Rumi (Ejae & Arden Cho); Mira (Audrey Nuna & May Hong); Zoey (Rei Ami & Ji-young Yoo)

Huntrix (/ˈhʌntrɪks/ HUN-triks; stylized as Huntr/x in all caps) is a virtual K-pop girl group introduced in the 2025 Netflix animated musical film KPop Demon Hunters. The group consists of three members – Rumi, Mira, and Zoey – whose singing voices are provided by Ejae, Audrey Nuna, and Rei Ami, respectively. Their respective speaking voices are provided by Arden Cho, May Hong, and Ji-young Yoo.

Following the release of KPop Demon Hunters, Huntrix received critical acclaim. The group has received many accolades, such as the 2025 Premios 40 Principales for Best International New Artist, the 2026 iHeartRadio Music Award for Best Duo/Group of the Year, and the 2026 Billboard Women of the Year. Their song "Golden" won the Best Original Song at both the 83rd Golden Globe Awards and the 98th Academy Awards as well as the 2026 Grammy Award for Best Song Written for Visual Media.

== Conception and creation ==
Official logo for Huntrix

The members of Huntrix are the protagonists of the 2025 Netflix animated film KPop Demon Hunters which was directed by Maggie Kang and Chris Appelhans. With-in the film's universe, Huntrix are the latest trio in a long line of female demon hunters, who use their singing and concerts to empower the magic Honmoon barrier and protect humanity from the demon king Gwi-Ma and his minions; their goal is to create the Golden Honmoon which will permanently keep demons out of the world. David Tizzard of The Korea Times explained that Huntrix perform "a traditional Korean shamanic gut ritual reimagined in a hypermodern stadium". KPop Demon Hunters was conceived by Kang who wanted to make a film "set in Korean culture"; she "delved into mythology and demonology for something that could be visually unique" compared to "mainstream media". She also called the film her "love letter to K-pop" and her "Korean roots". Kang explained that when developing the history of the demon hunters they decided to play into "the shaman women from Korean culture" as historically these women would "sing and dance to protect their village and their communities".

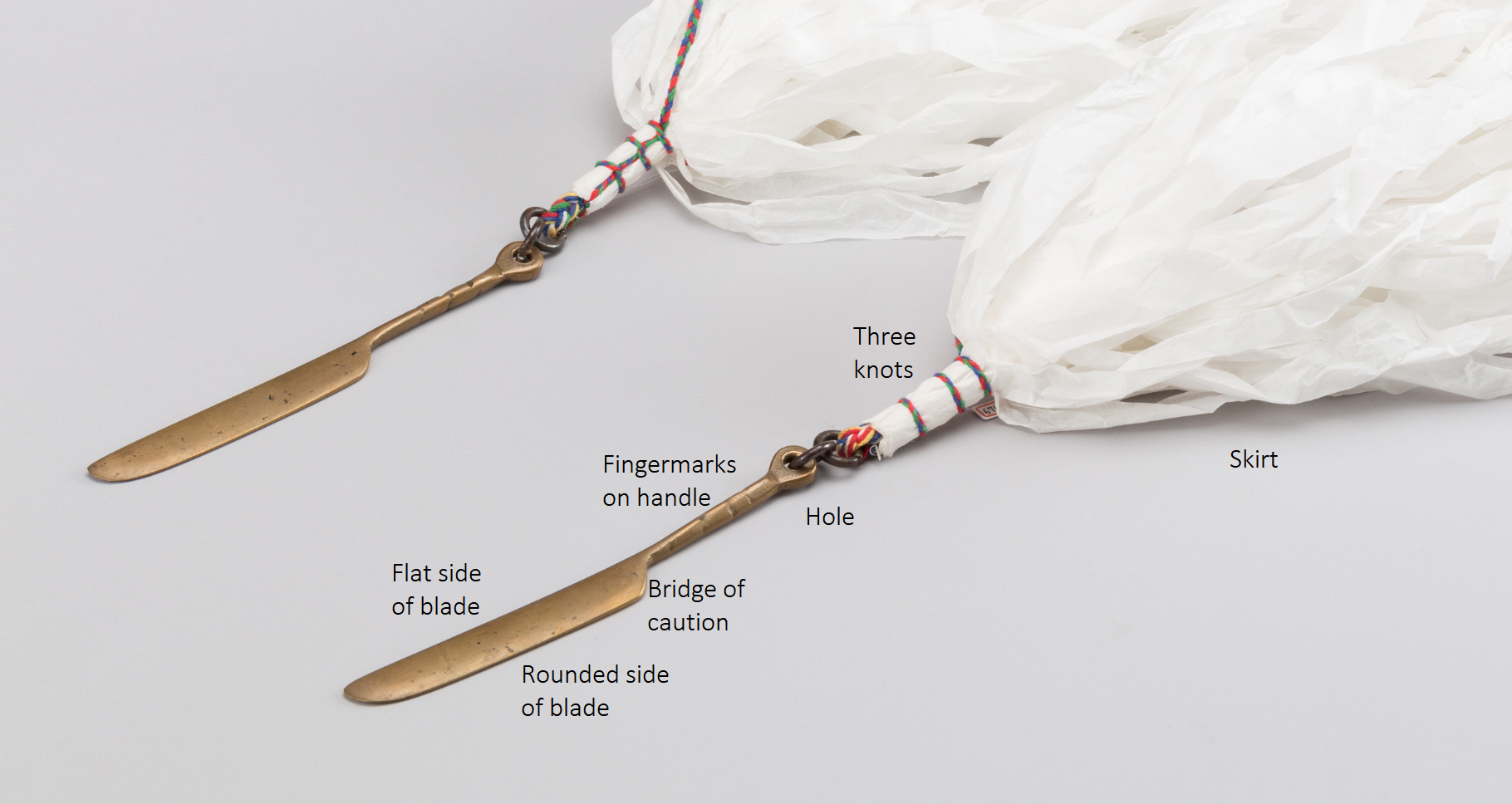
Sacred knives belonging to shaman Yi Jung-chun were used to model the shinkal throwing knives wielded by Zoey in the film.

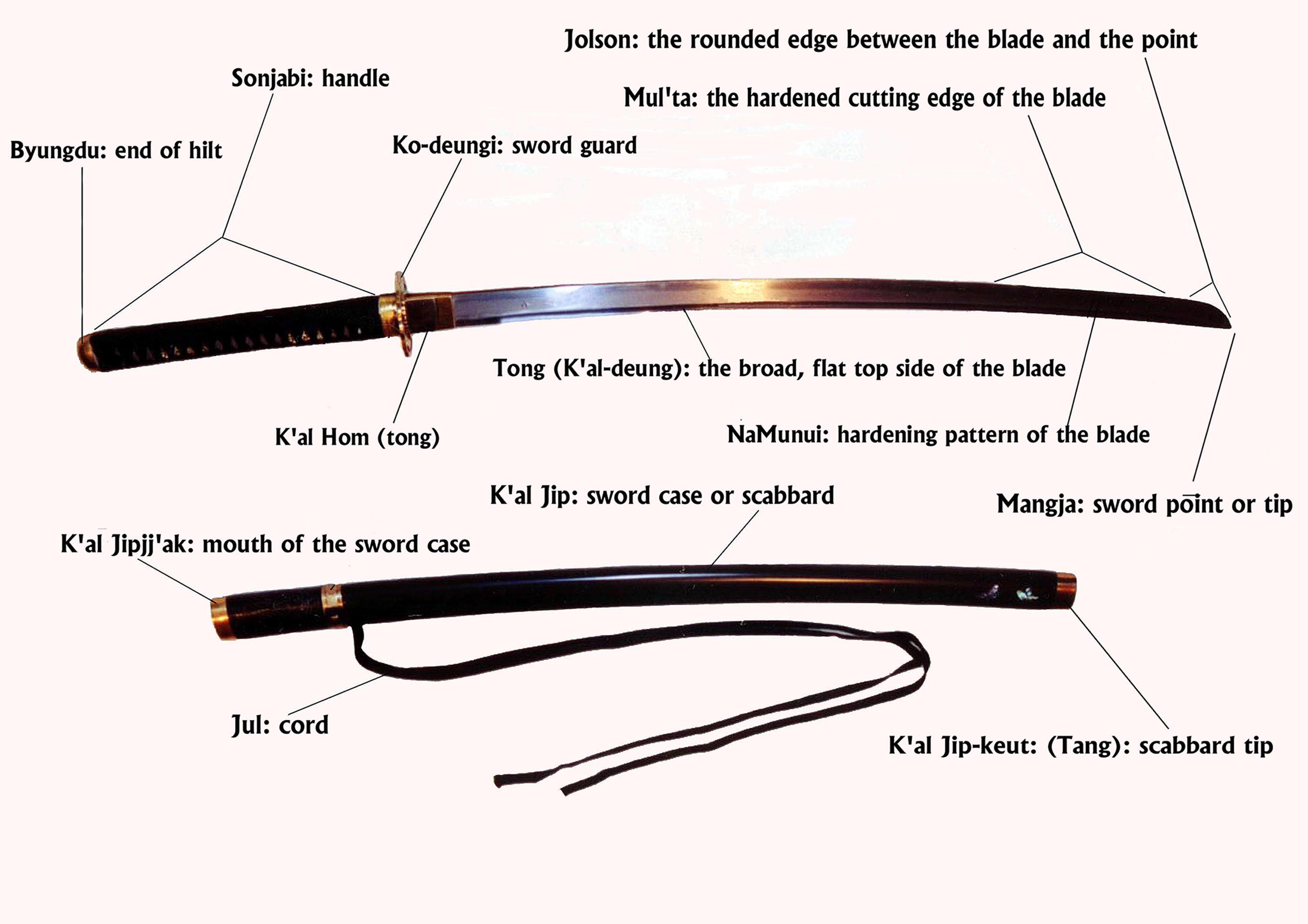
Rumi wields a saingeom, a type of Korean sword.

On the character design of Huntrix, Kang highlighted wanting to differentiate from "Marvel female superheroes that were just sexy and cool and badass" and instead have "girls who had potbellies and burped and were crass and silly and fun" leading to the creation of "something that encompassed all of those elements". The three members of Huntrix were modeled after K-pop girl groups like 2NE1, Itzy, Blackpink, Twice. Baek Byung-yeul of The Korea Times stated the styling of Huntrix and their rival group the Saja Boys connects to "the past and the present of Korea" – the members of Huntrix "wear 'norigae' pendants integrated into modern K-pop fashion" and the weapons they wield are rooted in "traditional Korean objects". The character of Rumi was originally "created for story artist Radford Sechrist's" comic Plastic Walrus; Sechrist is also Kang's husband and together "they came up with her name and her signature hairstyle together, and Kang later molded the concept into the Huntr/x leader".

For the film's music, Kang and Appelhans considered K-pop as an integral genre for selecting the musical tone. They enlisted an array of music producers to work on "chart-worthy K-pop tracks" including Teddy Park, co-founder of The Black Label, along with Grammy-nominated and winning producers Lindgren, Stephen Kirk, and Jenna Andrews, who had worked on music for K-pop artists such as BTS, Twice, and Blackpink amongst others. Ian Eisendrath served as the executive music producer, who noted "I've always thought of K-pop as the most theatrical genre of pop, and so I was just instantly excited by the possibilities of what could happen in a narrative context with the K-pop songs [and] incorporating actual, hit-making K-pop artists. I just felt like everything was really set up to be a special musical and narrative experience."

When writing Rumi's songs, Ejae drew inspiration from the girl groups she grew up listening to, such as 2NE1, Girls' Generation, and Blackpink. She noted, "That mix of sounds was such a big inspiration". With-in the film's universe, Huntrix is pit against the Saja Boys, a demon boy band. When comparing the songs of Huntrix and the Saja Boys, Appelhans explained they "wanted the Saja Boys' songs to be super catchy, but slightly hollow, like there's no real soul underneath" which contrasts with the "emotionally vulnerable and honest" Huntrix songs – "the idea was that the surface-level part of your heart might be obsessed with the boys, but the deeper part is moved by the girls".

== Appearances ==
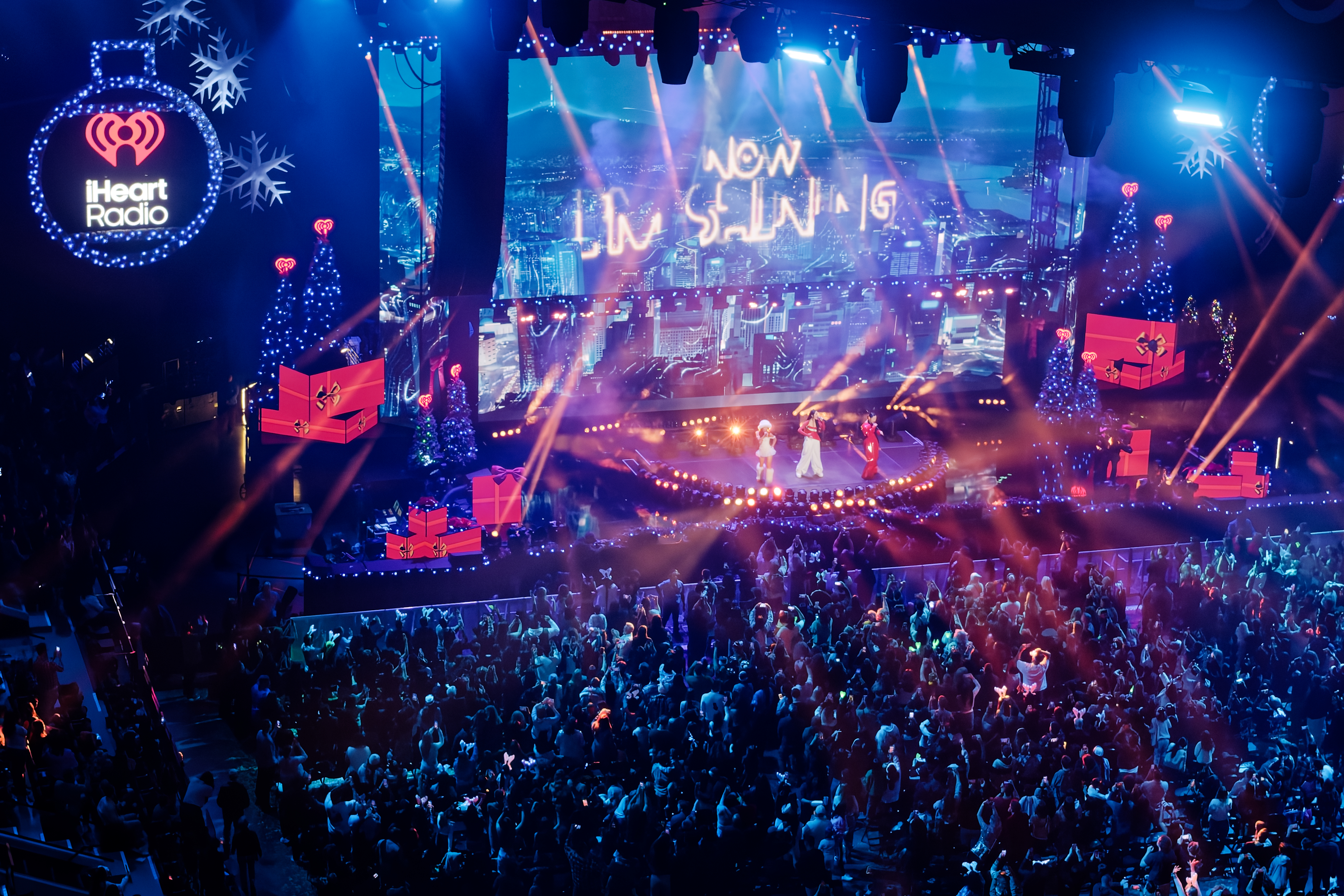
From left to right, the Huntrix singers Rei Ami, Ejae, and Audrey Nuna performing "Golden" at the 2025 KIIS-FM Jingle Ball.

Huntrix debuted on June 20, 2025, in the animated film KPop Demon Hunters and on its accompanying soundtrack. The Huntrix singers Ejae, Audrey Nuna, and Rei Ami did not meet until the film's premiere event as each singer recorded separately. Nuna commented that they "were thrown together, basically", and after seeing photos of them together, thought "'Damn, we look like we were perfectly calculated to be in this group.' The balance is nuts. But to think how serendipitous it was that this happened – we didn't audition in rooms or go through multiple rounds of pairings to find each other… It just speaks to the beauty of the universe and how things go and when things just happen". The group made a cameo appearance on the season 51 premiere of Saturday Night Live in a sketch based on the film, reprising their respective roles as Rumi, Mira and Zoey. A few days after, on October 7, 2025, "Golden" was performed live in full for the first time by Ejae, Nuna, and Rei Ami on The Tonight Show Starring Jimmy Fallon. In 2025, the group also performed at the Macy's Thanksgiving Day Parade, the KIIS-FM Jingle Ball, and at Snoop's Holiday Halftime Party.

Then on January 8, 2026, they performed on Jimmy Kimmel Live! with the debut of a new symphonic version of "Golden". This version, "Golden (Glowin' Version)", was released the following day. Also in January 2026, it was announced that "Golden" would be one of two live musical performances at the 98th Academy Awards (March 2026), following its nomination for the Academy Award for Best Original Song.

In April 2026, the group performed an abridged version of "How It's Done" as part of a McDonald's collaboration. On October 26, 2026, Netflix released an animated choreography video, featuring Rumi, Mira, and Zoey, for "How It's Done".

=== Golden World Tour ===
On May 13, 2026, Netflix announced a partnership with AEG Presents to launch a global KPop Demon Hunters concert tour. However, this announcement did not confirm if the Huntrix singing talent would appear on this tour.

In November 2026, they announced the Golden World Tour with its US leg scheduled to run from June 5 to August 14, 2027, followed by its European leg scheduled to run from September 1 to October 23, 2027. As of November 13, 2026, dates for other regions have not yet been announced; however, Variety reported the tour plans "to reach close to 50 cities and stage more than 150 shows" from 2027 to 2028. The tour will feature animated performances by Huntrix members Rumi, Mira, and Zoey as well as live-action performers, stunts and dance routines; other characters from the film will appear such as the Saja Boys and Derpy Tiger.

== Members ==
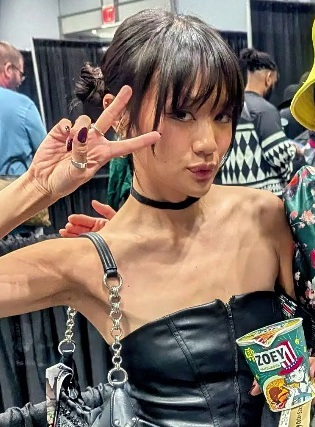
Ejae, Audrey Nuna, and Rei Ami are the singers for Huntrix's members Rumi, Mira, and Zoey, respectively
Arden Cho, May Hong, and Ji-young Yoo voice Rumi, Mira, and Zoey, respectively, in the film

The members of Huntrix consist of three characters from the film KPop Demon Hunters (2025):

- Rumi (voiced by Arden Cho, young Rumi voiced by Rumi Oak, singing voice provided by Ejae): the film's main character, she is the lead vocalist and leader of Huntrix, who wields a saingeom sword in combat. Rumi is the daughter of a demon father and her late mother Ryu Mi-yeong, who was a demon hunter and K-pop idol in the group Sunlight Sisters. She was raised by her mother's bandmate and fellow hunter Celine. Ejae was originally brought onto the film's production as a songwriter. Kang attributed Ejae's demos as one of the reasons the film was greenlit; in an interview with Genius Korea, Ejae explained she had co-written and recorded "most of the demos" for the film when the directors then asked her to be the official singing voice for the character Rumi. She attributed her casting to "the directors [getting] used to hearing [her] voice in the demos". Ejae commented that not only "was it a cool opportunity" but also she had "known the character for a long time" and "resonated so much with her and her storyline" so "it felt natural and confident to emote all Rumi's feelings while singing".
- Mira (voiced by May Hong, singing voice provided by Audrey Nuna): the visual and main dancer of Huntrix, who wields a gokdo polearm in combat. Mira comes from a wealthy background and was considered the black sheep of her family due to her rebellious nature. The character of Mira was inspired by South Korean model Ellis Ahn.
- Zoey (voiced by Ji-young Yoo, singing voice provided by Rei Ami): the main rapper, lyricist, and maknae of Huntrix, who wields shinkal throwing knives in combat. Zoey is Korean-American, and was raised in Burbank.

Laura Sirikul of the Los Angeles Times explained that prior to film's release, the Huntrix singers were "already established in the industry" – "Nuna and Ami as artists" and the former K-pop trainee Ejae "as a songwriter for K-pop groups". Sirikul commented that the film "propelled" them "into a new intensity of spotlight".

== Reception ==
Following the October 2025 performance by Ejae, Audrey Nuna and Rei Ami on The Tonight Show Starring Jimmy Fallon, Jennifer Zhan of Vulture wrote that "the more these three perform together, the more they look like a real group with an inspiring backstory, distinct personalities, and harmony onstage and off". Zhan commented that "their harmonies and high notes sound just as stable in real life as they do on the soundtrack". She argued that "with talent like this, it would be a waste to keep Huntr/x on the screen" and that "the longevity of a group this promising shouldn't be tied to Netflix or Sony's development timeline". Academic Dácil Roca Vera, in an analysis of the film's portrayal of both Huntrix and the Saja Boys, argued that the film presents "a gendered opposition" that emphasizes "ensemble action" through its lyrics and vocals. She noted that Huntrix's music "repeatedly" employs plural and affirmative language, as well as "semantics of repair/care" in the chorus sections; while, in contrast, the Saja Boys' music emphasizes power, adoration, and possession. Vera wrote that Huntrix's K-pop performance style, characterized by "precise geometries, cuts riding the beat, and toned-down sensual moves", is tailored to a family audience. Additionally, she explained that the group's members have "an idol body template" adapted for this audience, with distinctions conveyed through features such as hair, outfits, and weapons rather than "sexualised emphasis". Vera wrote that while Huntrix feature this body template, they are presented as physically capable figures, with minimalized sexualization; this supports interpretations centered on "capability and agency rather than objectification".

The Huntrix song "Golden" rose to number one on the U.S. Billboard Hot 100 during the week of August 16, 2025. Billboard reported that this was a milestone in multiple categories as Huntrix is the first to reach number one "for all-women collectives of three or more members" since "Bootylicious" by Destiny's Child in 2001, the first fictional act to reach number one since "We Don't Talk About Bruno" in 2022, and "'Golden' is the ninth song associated with Korean pop to conquer the Hot 100" as well as "the first by female lead vocalists". Vulture highlighted that those eight other K-pop songs were either BTS songs or solos by BTS members. "Golden" also claimed the number one spot on the Billboard Global 200 during the week of July 19, 2025.

== Discography ==
=== Soundtrack albums ===
Title	Details	Peak chart positions							Certifications
Title	Details	US	AUS	CAN	FRA	NZ	UK Com.	UK Sound.	Certifications
KPop Demon Hunters (with Kpop Demon Hunters Cast and Saja Boys)	Released: June 20, 2025; Label: Republic, Visva; Formats: CD, LP, digital download, streaming	1	1	1	2	1	1	1	RIAA: Platinum; ARIA: Gold; BPI: Platinum; MC: Platinum; RMNZ: 2× Platinum; SNEP: Platinum

=== Singles ===
Title	Year	Peak chart positions										Certifications	Album
Title	Year	US	AUS	CAN	KOR	MLY	NZ	PHL Hot	SGP	UK	WW	Certifications	Album
"Golden"	2025	1	1	1	1	1	1	2	1	1	1	RIAA: 5× Platinum; ARIA: 5× Platinum; BPI: 3× Platinum; KMCA: Platinum; MC: 8× Platinum; RMNZ: 5× Platinum	KPop Demon Hunters
"How It's Done"	2025	8	9	9	10	9	8	12	9	9	5	RIAA: Platinum; ARIA: 2× Platinum; BPI: Platinum; RMNZ: Platinum	KPop Demon Hunters

==== Promotional singles ====
Title	Year	Peak chart positions										Certifications	Album
Title	Year	US	AUS	CAN	KOR	MLY	NZ	PHL Hot	SGP	UK	WW	Certifications	Album
"What It Sounds Like"	2025	15	13	15	44	7	10	17	8	13	7	RIAA: Platinum; ARIA: 2× Platinum; BPI: Platinum; MC: 2× Platinum; RMNZ: Platinum	KPop Demon Hunters

=== Other charted songs ===
Title	Year	Peak chart positions										Certifications	Album
Title	Year	US	AUS	CAN	KOR	MLY	NZ	PHL Hot	SGP	UK	WW	Certifications	Album
"Takedown"	2025	21	17	25	37	18	18	24	13	67	11	ARIA: Platinum; BPI: Gold; MC: 2× Platinum; RMNZ: Platinum	KPop Demon Hunters

== Awards and nominations ==
Awards and nominations for Huntrix
Year	Award	Category	Work	Result	Refs.
2025	K-World Dream Awards	Best OST	"Golden"	Won	
2025	MTV Video Music Awards	Song of Summer	"Golden"	Nominated	
2025	NRJ Music Awards	Social Hit	"Golden" (David Guetta Remix)	Won	
2025	Korea Grand Music Awards	Best Virtual Artist	Huntrix	Nominated	
2025	Los 40 Music Awards	Best International New Artist	Huntrix	Won	
2025	Hollywood Music in Media Awards	Song – Animated Film	"Golden"	Won	
2025	Hollywood Music in Media Awards	Song – Onscreen Performance (Film)	"Golden"	Nominated	
2025	MAMA Awards	Best OST	"Golden"	Won	
2025	MAMA Awards	Song of the Year	"Golden"	Nominated	
2025	Asia Artist Awards	Best OST	"Golden"	Won	
2025	Las Vegas Film Critics Society	Best Song	"Golden"	Nominated	
2025	Melon Music Awards	Song of the Year	"Golden"	Nominated	
2025	Melon Music Awards	Best OST	"Golden"	Won	
2025	Georgia Film Critics Association Awards	Best Original Song	"Golden"	Runner-up	
2026	Critics' Choice Movie Awards	Best Song	"Golden"	Won	
2026	Capri Hollywood International Film Festival	Best Original Song	"Golden"	Won	
2026	Astra Film Awards	Best Original Song	"Golden"	Won	
2026	Golden Globe Awards	Best Original Song – Motion Picture	"Golden"	Won	
2026	American Cinematheque	Tribute to the Crafts Feature Film Song	"Golden"	Honored	
2026	Houston Film Critics Society	Best Original Song	"Golden"	Won	
2026	Grammy Awards	Song of the Year	"Golden"	Nominated	
2026	Grammy Awards	Best Pop Duo/Group Performance	"Golden"	Nominated	
2026	Grammy Awards	Best Song Written for Visual Media	"Golden"	Won	
2026	Grammy Awards	Best Remixed Recording	"Golden" (David Guetta Remix)	Nominated	
2026	Society of Composers & Lyricists Awards	Outstanding Original Song for a Comedy or Musical Visual Media Production	"Golden"	Won	
2026	Gold Derby Film Awards	Best Original Song	"Golden"	Won	
2026	Brit Awards	International Group of the Year	Huntrix	Nominated	
2026	Brit Awards	International Song of the Year	Huntrix	Nominated	
2026	Satellite Awards	Best Original Song	"Golden"	Nominated	
2026	Japan Gold Disc Award	Song of the Year by Download (Asia)	"Golden"	Won	
2026	Japan Gold Disc Award	Song of the Year by Streaming (Asia)	"Golden"	Won	
2026	Academy Awards	Best Original Song	"Golden"	Won	
2026	iHeartRadio Music Awards	Best Duo/Group of the Year	Huntrix	Won	
2026	iHeartRadio Music Awards	Pop Song of the Year	"Golden"	Nominated	
2026	iHeartRadio Music Awards	K-pop Song of the Year	"Golden"	Won	
2026	iHeartRadio Music Awards	Best Lyrics	"Golden"	Nominated	
2026	Billboard Women in Music	Billboard Women of the Year	Huntrix	Honored	
2026	American Music Awards	Song of the Year	"Golden"	Won	
2026	American Music Awards	Best Pop Song	"Golden"	Won	
2026	American Music Awards	Best Vocal Performance	"Golden"	Won	
2026	Music Awards Japan	Best Song Asia	"Golden"	Won	
2026	Music Awards Japan	Best International Pop Song in Japan	"Golden"	Nominated	
2026	Music Awards Japan	Best of Listeners' Choice: International Song powered by Spotify	"Golden"	Nominated	
2026	MTV Video Music Awards	Song of the Year	"Golden"	Nominated	
2026	World Soundtrack Awards	Best Original Song	"Golden"	Won	
