= Snowcone (Rei Ami song) =

Single by Rei Ami
- Released: September 25, 2019
- Genre: Rap
- Length: 2:36
- Label: Self-released (initial release); Sony Music/Visionary Records (re-release)
- Producer: Elie Rizk

Rei Ami singles chronology
"Make It Mine" (2019)	"Snowcone" (2019)	"Dictator" (2019)

Music video
- "Snowcone" on YouTube

"Snowcone" (stylized in all caps) is the breakout single by Korean-American singer-songwriter and rapper Rei Ami. The song was released on September 25, 2019 with Elie Rizk handling the production.

== Background ==
“Snowcone” combines the duality of rap with an introspective, lo-fi outro. Lee filmed the visualizer for the single, with a budget of under $100. This projected her success, with her signing to Visionary Records.
