= Rei Ami =

South Korean and American singer (born 1995)

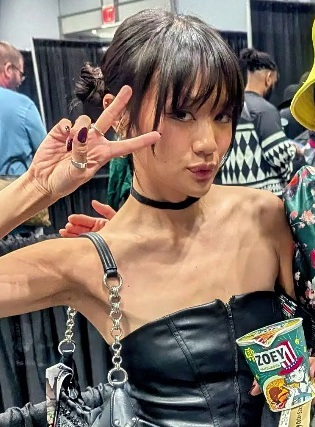
- Rei Ami at Anime NYC in 2025

Background information
- Born: Sarah Yeeun Lee; May 25, 1995 (age 31); Seoul, South Korea
- Origin: Germantown, Maryland, U.S.
- Genres: R&B; hip-hop; alt-pop
- Occupations: Singer; rapper
- Instrument: Vocals
- Years active: 2019–present
- Labels: Visionary; Republic

YouTube information
- Channel: REI AMI
- Years active: 2018–present
- Genre: Music
- Subscribers: 251,441
- Views: 36,651,631
- Last updated: November 22, 2026

Sarah Yeeun Lee (born May 25, 1995), known professionally as Rei Ami (pronounced RAY-AH-mee), is a South Korean and American singer and rapper. She rose to prominence with her guest performance on American musician Sub Urban's 2020 song "Freak", which gained virality on TikTok. The song peaked at number 28 on the Billboard Hot Rock & Alternative Songs.

Lee released her debut single, "Snowcone", in 2019; her debut mixtape, Foil, in June 2021; and her debut extended play Shhh, in November 2023. She has been nominated for a Grammy Award for Best Pop Duo/Group Performance and Premios Best International New Artist.

She provided the singing voice for the character Zoey in the 2025 musical film KPop Demon Hunters. "Golden", one of the songs produced for the film, topped the Billboard Hot 100 and charts in other countries. It received the Critics' Choice Award, Golden Globe Award, and Academy Award for Best Original Song. At the 68th Grammy Awards, the song received four nominations (including Song of the Year) and won Best Song Written for Visual Media. It is the first K-pop song to win a Grammy Award or an Academy Award.

== Early life ==
Sarah Yeeun Lee was born on May 25, 1995, in Seoul, South Korea, to South Korean parents. When she was six, her family moved to the United States, settling in Germantown, Maryland. She took lessons on piano and guitar. Her parents, devout Christians, paid for tutoring to ensure that she would perform at church services. She graduated from Northwest High School in Germantown, Maryland in 2014, then from the University of Maryland, College Park in 2018. In a 2020 interview with The Diamondback, Ami described her musical process during the COVID-19 quarantine: "It’s mostly virtual sessions. Every session is different with each producer but, you know, trying to just make it work. And it’s been successful so far."

== Career ==
visualizer music video of the song "Trippin' Toddlers" by Rei Ami

In 2019, Ami filmed the visualizer for her breakout single "Snowcone" with a budget of under $100. That led to her signing with Visionary Records.

=== 2020–2024: Freak and Foil ===
The official music video for "Freak" by Sub Urban, featuring Lee, was released on March 13, 2020, alongside Sub Urban's EP Thrill Seeker. The video, which was directed by Andrew Donoho, has a circus-themed background. Ami is depicted as a snake-human hybrid. On YouTube, the video has had over 292 million views and over 3.5 million videos on TikTok. Lee was featured on Rihanna's Savage X Fenty Show.

Her debut mixtape, Foil, released on June 25, 2021, included collaborations with Aminé on "Do It Right" and Lolo Zouaï on "Cherry Chapstick". The project showed her ability to move between assertive rap verses and melodic pop hooks.

=== 2025–present: KPop Demon Hunters, new music ===
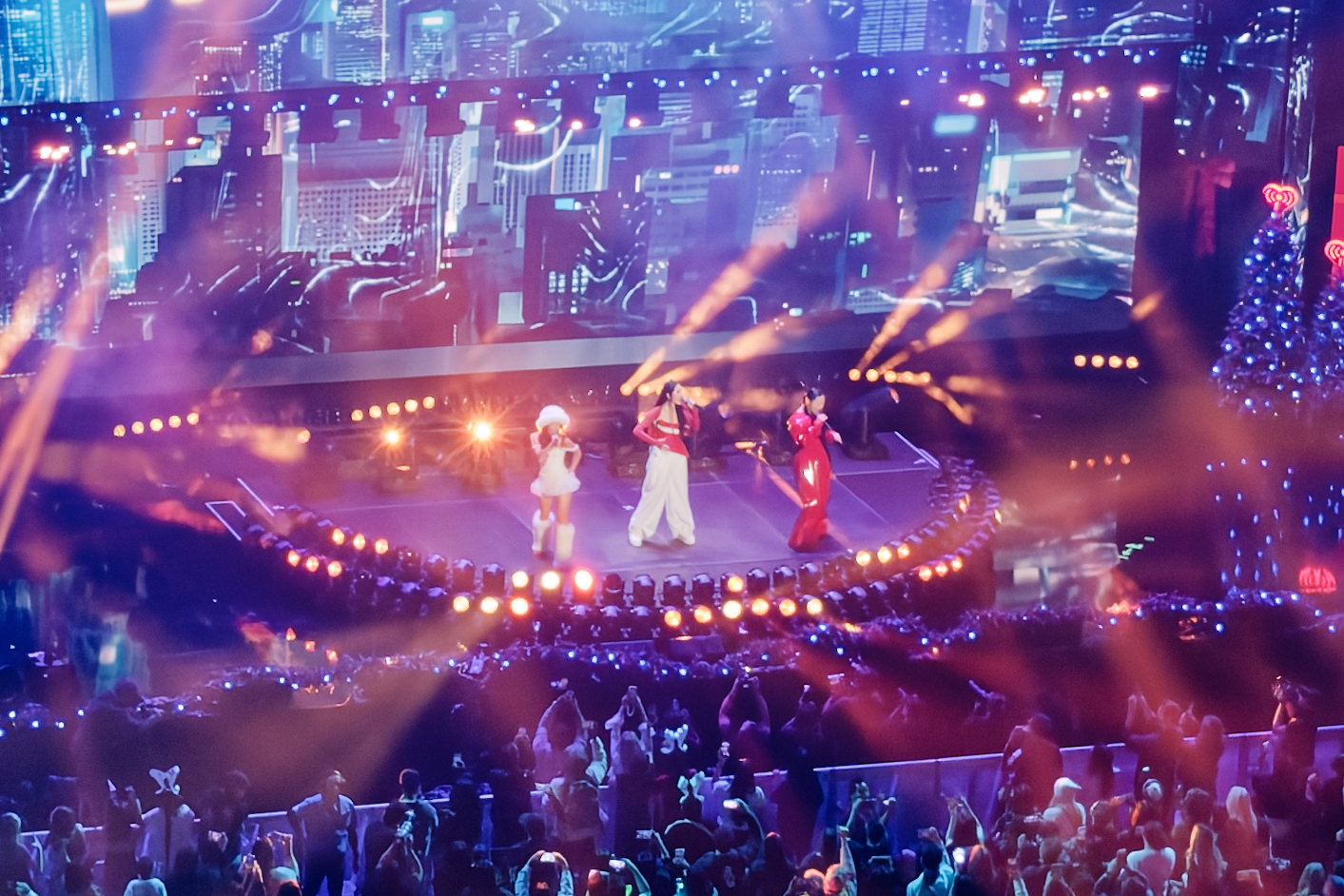
From left to right, the Huntrix singers Rei Ami, Ejae, and Audrey Nuna performing "Golden" at the 2025 KIIS-FM Jingle Ball.

On the soundtrack of the 2025 film KPop Demon Hunters, Ami provided the singing and rapping vocals for the character Zoey, in the songs "Golden", "How It's Done", "What It Sounds Like", and "Takedown" (soundtrack version). On October 4, 2025, she along with her fellow KPop Demon Hunters cast-mates Ejae and Audrey Nuna made a cameo appearance on the season 51 premiere of Saturday Night Live in a sketch based on the film, reprising their respective roles as Rumi, Mira and Zoey. On October 7, they together performed "Golden" live in full for the first time on The Tonight Show Starring Jimmy Fallon. On December 25, she and the other voices of Huntrix performed "12 Days of Christmas" at the Snoop Dogg 2025 NFL Halftime Show. On April 10, 2026, she and the other voices of Huntrix appeared during Katseye's Coachella 2026 performance as surprise guests and performed "Golden" alongside Katseye.

As of December 2025, she has been working on a new album after signing to Republic Records. On September 17, 2026, Ami released "2 Loud", her first single through the company.

== Personal life ==
Ami has talked about her personal challenges, including an erroneous diagnosis with depression during her first year of college and her 2022 diagnosis with bipolar disorder. She has called music a therapeutic outlet that has helped her navigate mental health struggles.

Ami is a self-proclaimed anime fan, and in a TikTok, attributed her stage name to the Sailor Moon characters Rei Hino and Ami Mizuno.

== Discography ==
=== Mixtapes ===
Title	Details
Foil	Released: June 25, 2021; Formats: Digital download, streaming, CD

=== EPs ===
Title	Details
Shhh	Released: November 10, 2023; Formats: Digital download, streaming, CD

=== Singles ===
As lead artist

Title	Year	Album
"Make It Mine"	2019	Non-album single
"Snowcone"	2019	Non-album single
"Dictator"	2019	Non-album single
"Runaway"	2020	Non-album single
"Mac & Cheese"	2020	Non-album single
"Do It Right" featuring Aminé	2021	Foil
"That's on You!"	2021	Foil
"F.R.A."	2021	Foil
"Ricky Bobby"	2021	Foil
"Hot One" featuring Leyla Blue and Baby Tate	2021	Non-album single
"Plaything" featuring Pussy Riot and Kito	2022	Non-album single
"Body Bag"	2023	Shhh

As featured artist

Title	Year	Details
"Freak" (Sub Urban featuring Rei Ami)	2020	Non-album single
"Bye" (Marsha Ambrosius featuring Rei Ami)	2020	Non-album single
"Rainy" (Dillon Francis featuring Rei Ami)	2023	This Mixtape Is Fire Too
"I See Red" (lilbubblegum featuring Rei Ami)	2024	Non-album single

=== Other charted songs ===
List of other charted songs, with selected chart positions and album name
Title	Year	Peak chart positions										Certifications	Album
Title	Year	US	AUS	CAN	KOR	MLY	NZ	PHL Hot	SGP	UK	WW	Certifications	Album
"How It's Done" (with Ejae and Audrey Nuna as Huntrix)	2025	8	7	9	10	9	8	12	9	9	5	RIAA: Platinum; ARIA: 2× Platinum; BPI: Platinum; RMNZ: Platinum	KPop Demon Hunters
"Golden" (with Ejae and Audrey Nuna as Huntrix)	2025	1	1	1	1	1	1	2	1	1	1	RIAA: 5× Platinum; ARIA: 5× Platinum; BPI: 3× Platinum; KMCA: Platinum; MC: 8× Platinum; RMNZ: 5× Platinum	KPop Demon Hunters
"Takedown" (with Ejae and Audrey Nuna as Huntrix)	2025	21	15	25	37	18	18	24	13	67	11	ARIA: Platinum; BPI: Platinum; MC: 2× Platinum; RMNZ: Platinum	KPop Demon Hunters
"What It Sounds Like" (with Ejae and Audrey Nuna as Huntrix)	2025	15	12	15	44	7	10	17	8	13	7	RIAA: Platinum; ARIA: 2× Platinum; BPI: Platinum; MC: 2× Platinum; RMNZ: Platinum	KPop Demon Hunters
"—" denotes releases that did not chart or were not released in that region.

== Filmography ==
Year	Title	Role	Notes	Ref.
2025	KPop Demon Hunters	Zoey (singing voice)	Netflix original movie	
2025	Saturday Night Live	Herself (Note: with Ejae and Audrey Nuna as Huntrix)	Season 51, Episode 1 Cameo	
2025	The Tonight Show with Jimmy Fallon	Herself	Guest and live performer	
2025	99th Macy's Thanksgiving Day Parade	Herself	Live performance	
2025	Dick Clark's New Year's Rockin' Eve	Herself	Live performance	

== Tours ==
Supporting

- 333 Tour (with Tinashe) (2021)
- Friends:Forever, SXSW 2024

== Accolades ==
=== Awards and nominations ===
Year	Award	Category	Work	Result	Ref.
2025	Asia Artist Awards	Best OST	"Golden"	Won	
2025	Hollywood Music in Media Awards	Song – Onscreen Performance (Film)	"Golden"	Nominated	
2025	K-World Dream Awards	Best OST	"Golden"	Won	
2025	Korea Grand Music Awards	Best Virtual Artist	"Golden"	Nominated	
2025	Los 40 Music Awards	Best International New Artist	Huntrix	Won	
2025	MAMA Awards	Best OST	"Golden"	Won	
2025	MTV Video Music Awards	Song of Summer	"Golden"	Nominated	
2025	Melon Music Awards	Song of the Year	"Golden"	Nominated	
2025	Melon Music Awards	Best OST	"Golden"	Won	
2025	Variety Hitmakers Awards	Variety's Hitmakers	Rei Ami	Honored	
2026	Advanced Imaging Society Lumiere Awards	Best Musical Scene or Sequence	"Golden"	Won	
2026	American Music Awards	Song of the Year	"Golden"	Won	
2026	American Music Awards	Best Pop Song	"Golden"	Won	
2026	American Music Awards	Best Vocal Performance	"Golden"	Won	
2026	Annie Awards	Outstanding Achievement for Music in a Feature Production	KPop Demon Hunters (Note: with KPop Demon Hunters Music Team.)	Won	
2026	Billboard Women in Music	Billboard Women of the Year	Huntrix	Honored	
2026	Brit Awards	International Group of the Year	Huntrix	Nominated	
2026	Brit Awards	International Song of the Year	"Golden"	Nominated	
2026	Dorian Award	Film Music of the Year	KPop Demon Hunters	Nominated	
2026	Grammy Awards	Best Pop Duo/Group Performance	"Golden"	Nominated	
2026	iHeartRadio Music Awards	Duo/Group of the Year	Huntrix	Won	
2026	iHeartRadio Music Awards	Pop Song of the Year	"Golden"	Nominated	
2026	iHeartRadio Music Awards	K-pop Song of the Year	"Golden"	Won	
2026	iHeartRadio Music Awards	Best Lyrics	"Golden"	Nominated	
2026	Japan Gold Disc Award	Song of the Year by Download (Asia)	"Golden"	Won	
2026	Japan Gold Disc Award	Song of the Year by Streaming (Asia)	"Golden"	Won	
2026	Korea First Brand Awards	Hot Icon (Female)	Huntrix	Won	
2026	Korean American Community Foundation	Trailblazer Award	Huntrix	Honored	
2026	MTV Video Music Awards	Song of the year	"Golden"	Nominated	
2026	Music Awards Japan	Best Song Asia	"Golden"	Won	
2026	Music Awards Japan	Best International Pop Song in Japan	"Golden"	Nominated	
2026	Music Awards Japan	International Song powered by Spotify	"Golden"	Nominated	
2026	Music City Film Critics Association	Best Original Song	"Golden"	Nominated	
2026	Nickelodeon Kids' Choice Awards	Favorite Song from a Movie	"Golden"	Won	
2026	SEC Awards	International Song of the Year	"Golden"	Nominated	

=== Listicles ===
Name of publisher, year listed, name of listicle, and placement
Publisher	Year	Listicle	Placement	Ref.
Billboard Korea	2025	K-Pop Artist 100	55th	
Forbes	2025	100 Most Powerful Women (Note: with The female creators and cast of the Netflix animated film KPop Demon Hunters)	100th	
Gold House	2026	Gold100 List (Note: with Maggie Kang, Michelle Wong, Arden Cho, May Hong, Ji-young Yoo, Ejae, Audrey Nuna) (Note: with Ejae, Audrey Nuna, Teddy, IDO & 24)	Included	
Luminate	2025	Most Streamed K-Pop Artist in US	2nd	
