= Audrey Nuna =

American singer-songwriter (born 1999)

- Nuna at the 2026 Met Gala

Background information
- Born: Audrey Chu; April 2, 1999 (age 27); Manalapan Township, New Jersey, U.S.
- Genres: R&B; hip hop; pop; trap
- Occupations: Singer; rapper; songwriter; director
- Years active: 2018–present
- Labels: Arista; Republic
- Website: audreynuna.com

Audrey Chu (born April 2, 1999), known by her stage name Audrey Nuna, is an American singer and rapper. She is best known for her singles "Damn Right" and "Comic Sans" (featuring Jack Harlow). She was born and raised in New Jersey, and studied in the Clive Davis Music Institute of New York University for her freshman year, but has since taken a break to focus on music. Her songs have been described as pop, R&B, rap and trap.

She is also known for providing the singing voice for the character Mira in the animated musical film KPop Demon Hunters (2025). "Golden", one of the songs she co-performed for the film, topped the Billboard Hot 100 and charts in other countries. It received the Critics' Choice Award, Golden Globe Award, and Academy Award for Best Original Song. At the 68th Grammy Awards, the song received four nominations (including Song of the Year) and won Best Song Written for Visual Media. It is the first K-pop song to win a Grammy Award or an Academy Award.

== Early life ==
Raised in Manalapan Township, New Jersey, Audrey Nuna – known first professionally as Audrey – started making music in her teens uploading covers. Her first experience singing for a large crowd was performing "America the Beautiful" at the US Open when she was ten. While attending the Clive Davis Institute in Brooklyn, she was contacted by producer and future manager Anwar Sawyer, who saw her Instagram covers.

== Career ==
=== 2018–2024: Independent tracks and Trench ===
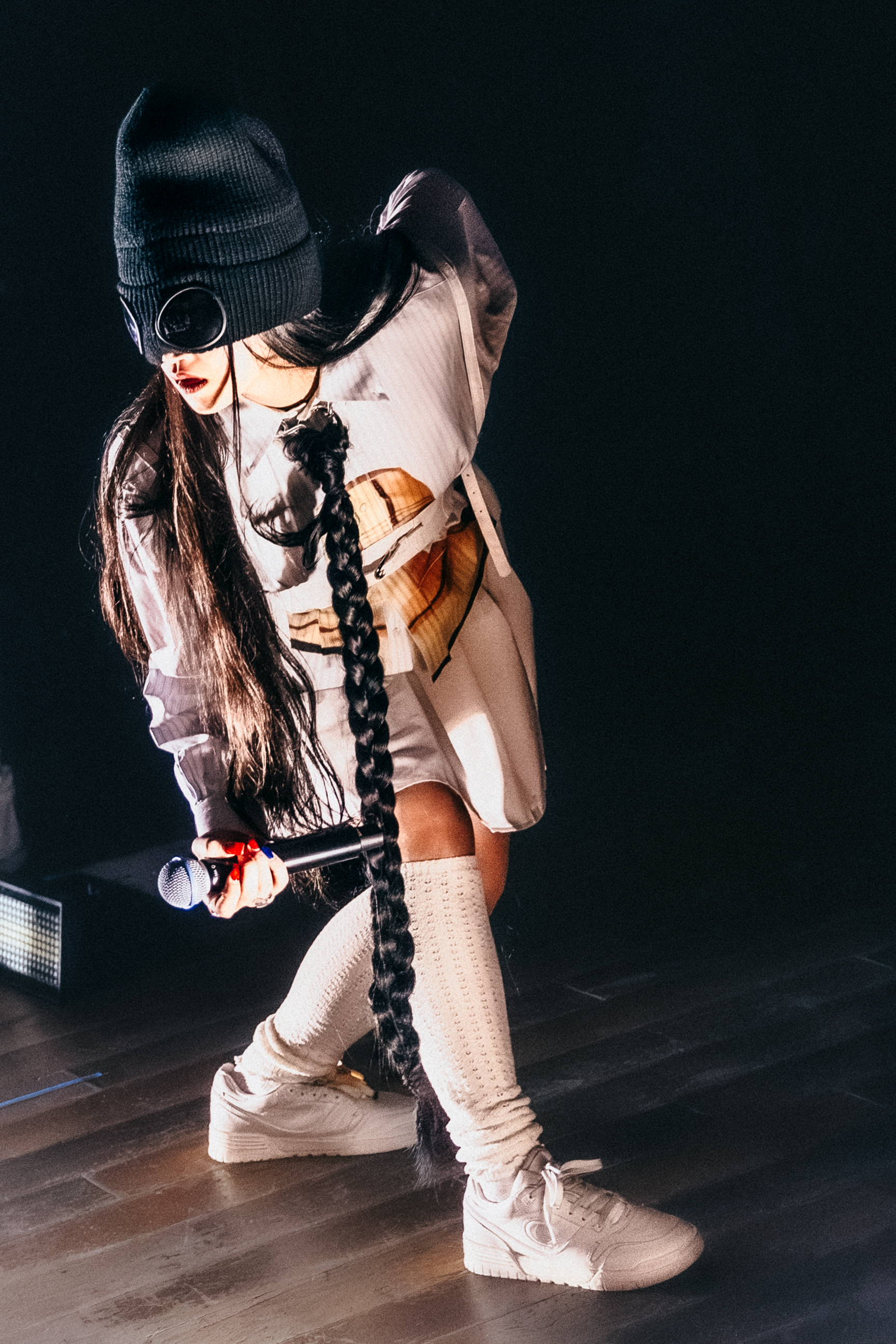
Audrey Nuna performing at the Chicago stop of her Trench Tour.

In 2018, Nuna began releasing independent tracks. In 2019, after she released two more singles, Sony Arista Records signed her to the label. She made her label debut with her singles "Time", "Paper", and a collaboration with Jack Harlow in "Comic Sans".

In 2020, she changed her stage name to Audrey Nuna and released more singles, including "damn Right" and "damn Right Pt. 2" with DJ Snake. The next year, she issued a ten-track project of previous singles and new tracks named A Liquid Breakfast. In 2024, she released her debut album, Trench.

=== 2025–present: KPop Demon Hunters ===
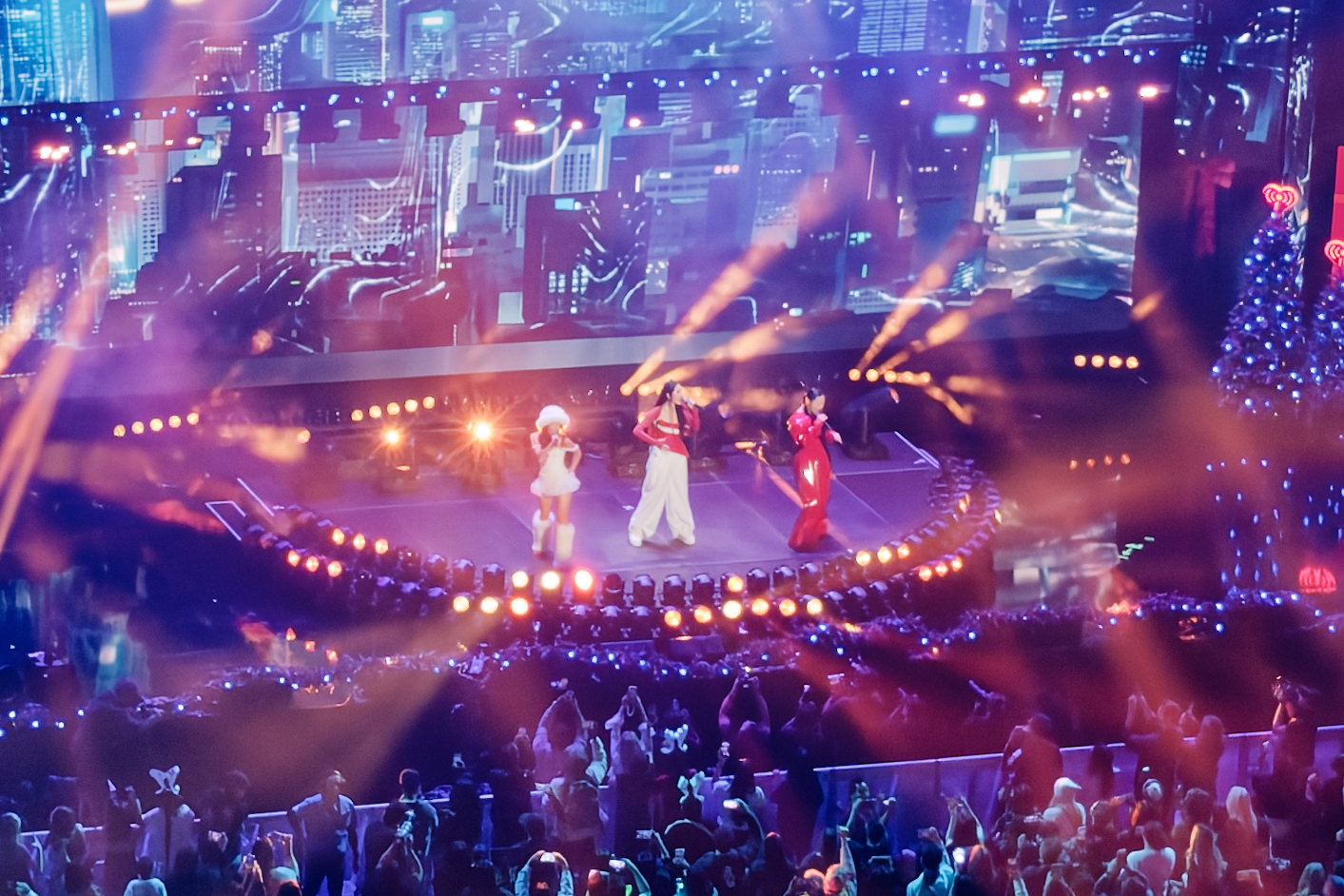
From left to right, the Huntrix singers Rei Ami, Ejae, and Audrey Nuna performing "Golden" at the 2025 KIIS-FM Jingle Ball.

On the soundtrack of the 2025 film KPop Demon Hunters, Nuna provided the singing voice for the character Mira, in the songs "Golden", "How It's Done", "What It Sounds Like", and "Takedown" (soundtrack version). On October 4, 2025, she along with her fellow KPop Demon Hunters cast-mates Ejae and Rei Ami made a cameo appearance on the season 51 premiere of Saturday Night Live in a sketch based on the film, reprising their respective roles as Rumi, Mira and Zoey. On October 7, they together performed "Golden" live in full for the first time on The Tonight Show Starring Jimmy Fallon. On December 25, she and the other voices of Huntrix performed "12 Days of Christmas" at the Snoop Dogg 2025 NFL Halftime Show.

Nuna performed at the opening ceremony for the 2026 AFC Women's Asian Cup at Perth Stadium in Australia, then at halftime of the first game. On April 10, 2026, she and the other voices of Huntrix appeared during Katseye's Coachella 2026 performance as surprise guests and performed "Golden" alongside Katseye.

In August 2026, it was reported that Nuna had signed with Republic Records.

== Discography ==
=== Projects ===
Title	Details
A Liquid Breakfast	Released: May 21, 2021; Label: Arista
Chump Change (with Deb Never)	Released: June 3, 2022; Label: Arista
Trench	Released: October 18, 2024; Label: Arista

=== Singles ===
Title	Year	Album
"80deg"	2018	Non-album single
"Party"	2018	Non-album single
"I Try"	2018	Non-album single
"Honeypot"	2018	Non-album single
"Empty Hands"	2019	Non-album single
"Soufflé"	2019	Non-album single
"Time"	2019	Non-album single
"Paper"	2019	Non-album single
"Comic Sans" (featuring Jack Harlow)	2019	A Liquid Breakfast
"Long Night"	2020	Non-album single
"Damn Right"	2020	A Liquid Breakfast
"Space"	2021	A Liquid Breakfast
"Blossom"	2021	A Liquid Breakfast
"That XX -- Spotify Singles"	2021	Non-album single
"IDGAF"	2023	Non-album single
"Locket"	2023	Trench
"Cellulite"	2023	Non-album single
"Starving" (featuring Teezo Touchdown)	2024	Trench
"Jokes On Me"	2024	Trench
"Suckin Up"	2024	Trench
"Mine"	2024	Trench

=== Other charted songs ===
List of other charted songs, with selected chart positions and album name
Title	Year	Peak chart positions										Certifications	Album
Title	Year	US	AUS	CAN	KOR	MLY	NZ	PHL Hot	SGP	UK	WW	Certifications	Album
"How It's Done" (with Ejae and Rei Ami as Huntrix)	2025	8	7	9	10	9	8	12	9	9	5	RIAA: Platinum; ARIA: 2× Platinum; BPI: Platinum; RMNZ: Platinum	KPop Demon Hunters
"Golden" (with Ejae and Rei Ami as Huntrix)	2025	1	1	1	1	1	1	2	1	1	1	RIAA: 5× Platinum; ARIA: 5× Platinum; BPI: 3× Platinum; KMCA: Platinum; MC: 8× Platinum; RMNZ: 5× Platinum	KPop Demon Hunters
"Takedown" (with Ejae and Rei Ami as Huntrix)	2025	21	15	25	37	18	18	24	13	67	11	ARIA: Platinum; BPI: Platinum; MC: 2× Platinum; RMNZ: Platinum	KPop Demon Hunters
"What It Sounds Like" (with Ejae and Rei Ami as Huntrix)	2025	15	12	15	44	7	10	17	8	13	7	RIAA: Platinum; ARIA: 2× Platinum; BPI: Platinum; MC: 2× Platinum; RMNZ: Platinum	KPop Demon Hunters
"—" denotes releases that did not chart or were not released in that region.

== Filmography ==
Year	Title	Role	Notes	Ref.
2025	KPop Demon Hunters	Mira (singing voice)	Netflix original movie	
2025	The Tonight Show with Jimmy Fallon	Herself	Guest and live performer (Note: with Ejae and Rei Ami as Huntrix)	
2025	Saturday Night Live	Herself	Season 51, Episode 1 Cameo	
2025	99th Macy's Thanksgiving Day Parade	Herself	Live performance	
2025	Dick Clark's New Year's Rockin' Eve	Herself	Live performance	

== Awards and nominations ==
Year	Award	Category	Work	Result	Refs.
2023	UK Music Video Awards	Best Visual Effects in a Video (VFX Artist: Square)	"Locket"	Won	
2023	UK Music Video Awards	Best Hip Hop/Grime/Rap Video – International (Director: Valentin Petit)	"Locket"	Nominated	
2023	UK Music Video Awards	Best Styling in a Video (Stylist: Florie Vitse)	"Locket"	Nominated	
2023	UK Music Video Awards	Best Editing in a Video (Editors: Valentin Petit & Simon Tristant at Monumental FX)	"Locket"	Nominated	
2024	Berlin Music Video Awards	Best Visual Effects in a Video (VFX Artist: Square)	"Locket"	3rd Place	
2024	UK Music Video Awards	Best Hip Hop / Grime / Rap Video – Newcomer (Director: Zac Dov Wiesel)	"Cellulite"	Nominated	
2025	Asia Artist Awards	Best OST	"Golden"	Won	
2025	Berlin Music Video Awards	Best VFX	"Jokes on Me"	Nominated	
2025	K-World Dream Awards	Best OST	"Golden"	Won	
2025	Korea Grand Music Awards	Best Virtual Artist	"Golden"	Nominated	
2025	Los 40 Music Awards	Best International New Artist	Huntrix	Won	
2025	MAMA Awards	Best OST	"Golden"	Won	
2025	Melon Music Awards	Song of the Year	"Golden"	Nominated	
2025	Melon Music Awards	Best OST	"Golden"	Won	
2025	MTV Video Music Awards	Song of Summer	"Golden"	Nominated	
2025	UK Music Video Awards	Best R&B / Soul / Jazz Video – International (Director: Zac Dov Wiesel)	"Mine"	Won	
2025	Variety Hitmakers Awards	Variety's Hitmakers	Audrey Nuna	Honored	
2026	Advanced Imaging Society Lumiere Awards	Best Musical Scene or Sequence	"Golden"	Won	
2026	American Music Awards	Song of the Year	"Golden"	Won	
2026	American Music Awards	Best Pop Song	"Golden"	Won	
2026	American Music Awards	Best Vocal Performance	"Golden"	Won	
2026	Annie Awards	Outstanding Achievement for Music in a Feature Production	KPop Demon Hunters (Note: with KPop Demon Hunters Music Team.)	Won	
2026	Billboard Women in Music	Billboard Women of the Year	Huntrix	Honored	
2026	Brit Awards	International Group of the Year	Huntrix	Nominated	
2026	Brit Awards	International Song of the Year	"Golden"	Nominated	
2026	Dorian Award	Film Music of the Year	KPop Demon Hunters	Nominated	
2026	Grammy Awards	Best Pop Duo/Group Performance	"Golden"	Nominated	
2026	iHeartRadio Music Awards	Duo/Group of the Year	Huntrix	Won	
2026	iHeartRadio Music Awards	Pop Song of the Year	"Golden"	Nominated	
2026	iHeartRadio Music Awards	K-pop Song of the Year	"Golden"	Won	
2026	iHeartRadio Music Awards	Best Lyrics	"Golden"	Nominated	
2026	Japan Gold Disc Award	Song of the Year by Download (Asia)	"Golden"	Won	
2026	Japan Gold Disc Award	Song of the Year by Streaming (Asia)	"Golden"	Won	
2026	Korea First Brand Awards	Hot Icon (Female)	Huntrix	Won	
2026	Korean American Community Foundation	Trailblazer Award	Huntrix	Honored	
2026	MTV Video Music Awards	Song of the year	"Golden"	Nominated	
2026	Music Awards Japan	Best Song Asia	"Golden"	Won	
2026	Music Awards Japan	Best International Pop Song in Japan	"Golden"	Nominated	
2026	Music Awards Japan	International Song powered by Spotify	"Golden"	Nominated	
2026	Music City Film Critics Association	Best Original Song	"Golden"	Nominated	
2026	Nickelodeon Kids' Choice Awards	Favorite Song from a Movie	"Golden"	Won	
2026	SEC Awards	International Song of the Year	"Golden"	Nominated	

=== Listicles ===
Name of publisher, year listed, name of listicle, and placement
Publisher	Year	Listicle	Placement	Ref.
Billboard Korea	2025	K-Pop Artist 100	55th	
Forbes	2025	100 Most Powerful Women (Note: with The female creators and cast of the Netflix animated film KPop Demon Hunters)	100th	
Luminate	2025	Most Streamed K-Pop Artist in US	2nd	
Gold House	2026	Gold100 List (Note: with Maggie Kang, Michelle Wong, Arden Cho, May Hong, Ji-young Yoo, Ejae, Rei Ami) (Note: with Ejae, Rei Ami, Teddy, IDO & 24)	Included	
