= Songwriters of North America =

Trade organization for songwriters' rights

Songwriters of Northern America
- Nickname: SONA
- Formation: 2015
- Founders: Michelle Lewis, Kay Hanley
- Tax ID no.: 81-1193694
- Headquarters: 9000 W Sunset Blvd; West Hollywood, CA 90069
- Website: www.wearesona.com

Songwriters of Northern America (SONA) is a not-for-profit trade organization for songwriters' rights. It was founded by Michelle Lewis and Kay Hanley in January 2015, in order to advocate for fair remuneration for songwriters in the era of streaming digital music services. The organization allows songwriters to organize to lobby for better licensing rates for music creators with digital streaming companies like Spotify and Pandora. In 2016 the band sued the Justice Department who they claim "overstepped its authority and that its ruling violated the property rights of songwriters by potentially nullifying private contracts between writers who have worked on the same song." SONA also pressed for fair pay for songwriters within other music legislation including crafting, lobbying and working to pass the Music Modernization Act.

In addition to advocacy, SONA hosts "Back To School" nights and public speakers in order to educate songwriters at all levels on the complicated and ever-changing digital music industry. In 2020 the group, led by Michelle Lewis, Jess Furman and Sarah Robertson organized to offer emergency grants to songwriters facing economic hardship because of the COVID pandemic. In addition, SONA successfully lobbied for independent contractors to be included in the CARES Act and continued to lobby for fair inclusion of mixed earners in relief aid.

== Overview ==
SONA is almost entirely run by volunteers with leadership coming from their Board of Directors, made up of songwriters and music industry professionals.

=== Board of Directors ===
- Michelle Lewis
- Kay Hanley
- Adam Dorn
- Adam Gorgoni
- Autumn Rowe
- Dina LaPolt
- Jack Kugell
- Jared Brenner
- Mark Pariser
