= Mark Sonnenblick =

American composer and songwriter

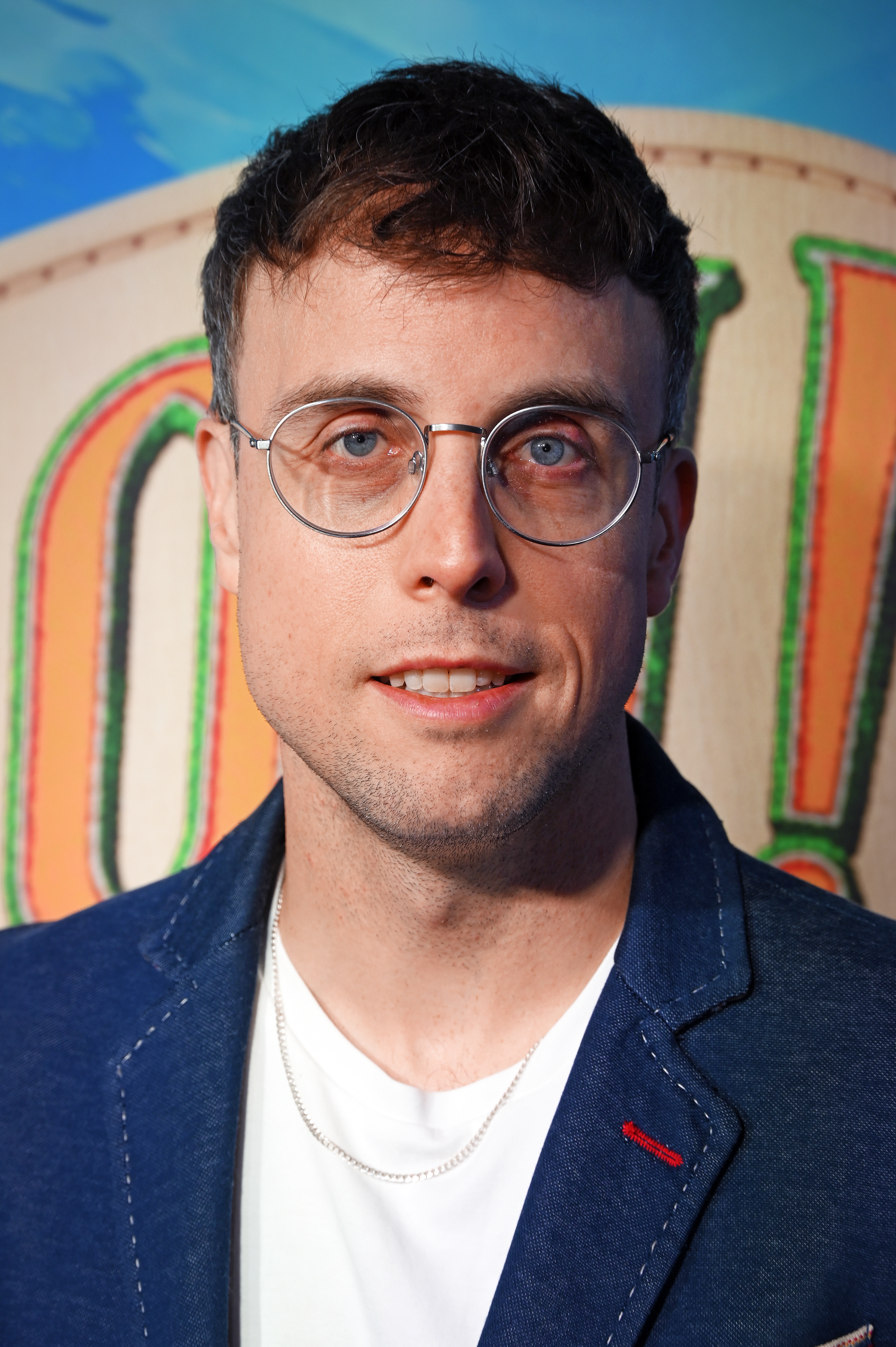
- Sonnenblick in 2026
- Born: 1989 or 1990 (age 36–37)
- Education: Yale College (BA)
- Occupations: Songwriter; composer
- Years active: 2014–present
- Spouse: Isaac Josephthal (m. 2023)
- Website: marksonnenblick.com

Mark Sonnenblick is an American songwriter and composer, with credits in musical theater, film, and television. He is one of the lyricists for the musical The Devil Wears Prada, and has written songs for the films Lyle, Lyle, Crocodile (2022), Spirited (2022), and Theater Camp (2023). Sonnenblick co-wrote many of the songs for the animated film KPop Demon Hunters (2025), including "Golden", which topped the Billboard Hot 100 and won him an Academy Award as well as a Grammy Award.

== Early and personal life ==
Sonnenblick grew up in Manhattan Beach, California, and started playing the piano and eventually songwriting as a child. He was introduced to musical theater by his high school music teacher Mr. Richard Babcock, who retired in 2026 after 39 years of teaching at Chadwick School. Sonnenblick is also an alum of Chadwick School, which he graduated as Class of 2008. In 2012, he graduated with a Bachelor of Arts in American studies from Yale College. He moved to Denver after college, and then to New York City in 2014, where he started writing musicals. He was the recipient of a Jonathan Larson Grant in 2018, presented by the American Theatre Wing. He is openly gay, and was honored by Out as one of the Out100 in 2025.

== Career ==
=== Theater work ===
Sonnenblick wrote the lyrics for Independents, a musical performed at the New York International Fringe Festival in 2012. He also wrote the music for the musical Midnight at the Never Get, which was staged off-Broadway at the York Theatre in 2018. The production was nominated for two Drama Desk Awards in 2019, with Sonnenblick nominated in the category of Outstanding Music. It was additionally nominated in the category of Outstanding Musical at the 2019 Lucille Lortel Awards. A London production has been announced to open in July 2026.

Sonnenblick served as an additional lyricist to Shaina Taub for The Devil Wears Prada, which has music by Elton John and a book by Kate Wetherhead. Based on both the 2003 novel and 2006 film adaptation, the musical premiered in Chicago in 2022 before starting a West End run in 2024. Taub asked Sonnenblick to join the creative team, in order to revise and write additional lyrics for the West End production.

As of 2025, Sonnenblick is working on a stage adaptation of the film Weekend (2011). In addition, he is writing music and lyrics for a musical stage adaptation of the novel series The Baby-Sitters Club, with a book by Wetherhead and plans for a premiere in 2027.

=== Film and television work ===
Sonnenblick was nominated for a Primetime Emmy Award in the category of Outstanding Original Music and Lyrics for "Beautiful Things Can Grow" from the documentary Song of Parkland (2019). Sonnenblick co-wrote "All That" with Benj Pasek, Taub, and Hannah Friedman for the COVID-19 pandemic fundraiser Saturday Night Seder in 2020.

Sonnenblick joined as one of the songwriters working with Pasek and Paul for the soundtrack of Lyle, Lyle, Crocodile, the 2022 film adaptation of the children's book of the same name. He was also a songwriter for the soundtrack of Spirited (2022), a modern musical film adaptation of A Christmas Carol (1843). One of the songs he co-wrote was "Good Afternoon", which was nominated at the 2023 Society of Composers & Lyricists Awards and shortlisted for Best Original Song at the 96th Academy Awards.

For the musical film Theater Camp (2023), Sonnenblick co-wrote the songs and score, and was also responsible for arrangement and production of its soundtrack. One of its songs, "Camp Isn't Home", earned Sonnenblick nominations at the Guild of Music Supervisors Awards (for Best Song Written and/or Recording Created for a Film) and at the Astra Film Awards (Best Original Song in 2024).

The music team behind the animated film KPop Demon Hunters (2025) brought on Sonnenblick as a collaborator to write lyrics incorporating the narrative. He is credited as a songwriter on most of the film's songs, including "Golden" and "Your Idol". The songs were commercially and critically successful, with "Golden" topping the U.S. Billboard Hot 100 for eight weeks and receiving four Grammy Award nominations for the ceremony in 2026; as a songwriter, Sonnenblick was nominated in two of the categories: Song of the Year and Best Song Written for Visual Media, winning in the latter.

== Awards and nominations ==
=== Academy Awards ===
Year	Category	Nominated work	Result	Ref.
2025	Best Original Song	"Golden" (from KPop Demon Hunters)	Won	

=== Annie Awards ===
Year	Category	Nominated work	Result	Ref.
2025	Outstanding Achievement for Music in a Feature Production	KPop Demon Hunters (Note: As part of the Music Team.)	Won	

=== The Astra Awards ===
Year	Category	Nominated work	Result	Ref.
2023	Best Original Song	"Camp Isn't Home" (from Theater Camp)	Nominated	
2025	Best Original Song	"Golden" (from KPop Demon Hunters)	Won	

=== Critics' Choice Movie Awards ===
Year	Category	Nominated work	Result	Ref.
2025	Best Song	"Golden" (from KPop Demon Hunters)	Won	

=== Drama Desk Awards ===
Year	Category	Nominated work	Result	Ref.
2019	Outstanding Music	Midnight at the Never Get	Nominated	

=== Emmy Awards ===
Year	Category	Nominated work	Result	Ref.
Primetime Emmy Awards
2019	Outstanding Original Music and Lyrics	"Beautiful Things Can Grow" (from Song of Parkland)	Nominated	

=== Georgia Film Critics Association Awards ===
Year	Category	Nominated work	Result	Ref.
2025	Best Original Song	"Golden" (from KPop Demon Hunters)	Runner-up	

=== Golden Globe Awards ===
Year	Category	Nominated work	Result	Ref.
2025	Best Original Song	"Golden" (from KPop Demon Hunters)	Won	

=== Grammy Awards ===
Year	Category	Nominated work	Result	Ref.
2025	Song of the Year	"Golden" (from KPop Demon Hunters)	Nominated	
2025	Best Song Written for Visual Media	"Golden" (from KPop Demon Hunters)	Won	

=== Guild of Music Supervisors Awards ===
Year	Category	Nominated work	Result	Ref.
2023	Best Song Written and/or Recorded for a Film	"Camp Isn't Home" (from Theater Camp)	Nominated	

=== Hollywood Music in Media Awards ===
Year	Category	Nominated work	Result	Ref.
2025	Best Original Song in an Animated Film	"Golden" (from KPop Demon Hunters)	Won	

=== Satellite Awards ===
Year	Category	Nominated work	Result	Ref.
2025	Best Original Song	"Golden" (from KPop Demon Hunters)	Nominated	

=== Society of Composers & Lyricists Awards ===
Year	Category	Nominated work	Result	Ref.
2022	Outstanding Original Song for a Comedy or Musical Visual Media Production	"Good Afternoon" (from Spirited)	Nominated	
2025	Outstanding Original Song for a Comedy or Musical Visual Media Production	"Golden" (from KPop Demon Hunters)	Won	

=== World Soundtrack Awards ===
Year	Category	Nominated work	Result	Ref.
2026	Best Original Song	"Golden" (from KPop Demon Hunters)	Won	
