= List of Kyra Sedgwick performances =

Filmography for American actress, producer and director Kyra Sedgwick

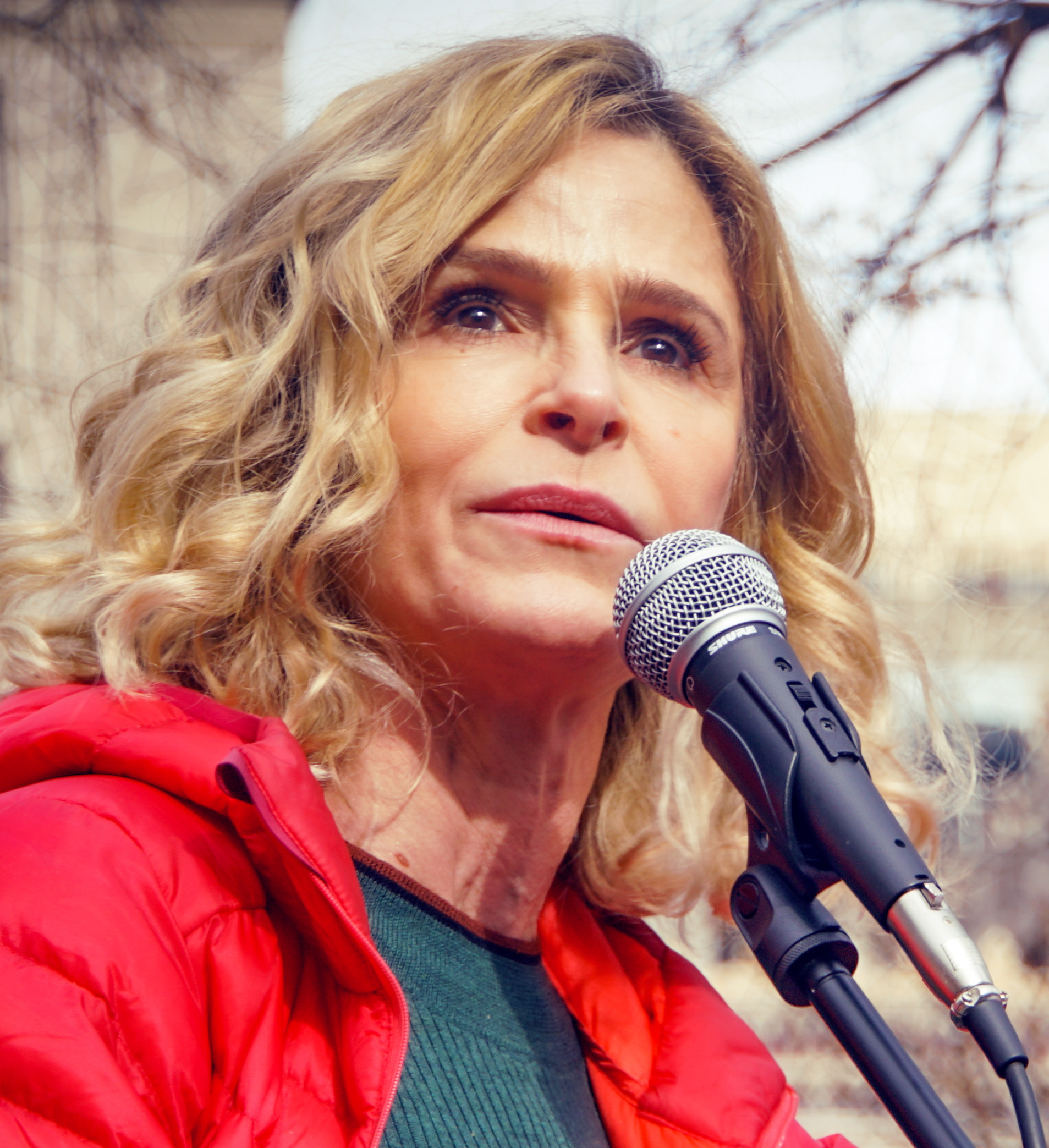
In December 2019

Kyra Sedgwick is an American actress, producer and director. Her career begin when she played Julia Shearer in the soap opera Another World from 1982 to 1983. Her first film was the 1985 drama film War and Love in which she starred. Her other roles in the late 1980s included Tai-Pan (1986) and Born on the Fourth of July (1989). During the 1990s, she co-starred in the films Singles opposite Campbell Scott (1992), Heart and Souls with Robert Downey Jr. (1993), Something to Talk About with Julia Roberts and Robert Duvall (1995), Phenomenon with John Travolta and again with Robert Duvall (1996), and Montana with Stanley Tucci (1998).

In the 2000s, Sedgwick appeared in the films What's Cooking? (2000), Secondhand Lions, her third collaboration with Robert Duvall (2003) and Loverboy which she also produced and was directed by her husband Kevin Bacon (2005). In 2005, she was cast in the role of Brenda Leigh Johnson in the TNT police procedural series The Closer. She would play that role until the series ended in 2012. The role earned her a Golden Globe Award for Best Actress in Television Series Drama (2007) and Primetime Emmy Award for Outstanding Lead Actress in a Drama Series (2010). During that time she also appeared in the films The Game Plan (2007), Gamer (2009), and Man on a Ledge (2012).

Sedgwick's other television credits include Talk to Me (2000), Queens Supreme (2003), as Madeline Wuntch in Brooklyn Nine-Nine (2014–2020), Ten Days in the Valley (2017–2018), and Call Your Mother (2021).

== Film ==
Year	Title	Role	Notes	Ref.
1985	War and Love	Halina		
1986	Tai-Pan	Tess Brock		
1988	Kansas	Prostitute drifter		
1989	Born on the Fourth of July	Donna		
1990	Mr. & Mrs. Bridge	Ruth Bridge		
1991	Pyrates	Sam		
1992	Singles	Linda Powell		
1992	Oliver Stone: Inside Out	Herself	Documentary	
1993	Heart and Souls	Julia		
1995	Murder in the First	Blanche		
1995	Something to Talk About	Emma Rae King		
1995	The Low Life	Bevan		
1996	Phenomenon	Lace Pennamin		
1997	Critical Care	Felicia Potter		
1998	Montana	Claire Kelsky	Also associate producer	
2000	Labor Pains	Sarah Raymond		
2000	What's Cooking?	Rachel Seelig		
2000	Conversations with Jon Turteltaub	Herself	Documentary	
2002	Personal Velocity: Three Portraits	Delia Shunt		
2002	Just a Kiss	Halley		
2003	Secondhand Lions	Mae		
2003	Batman: Mystery of the Batwoman	Batwoman	Voice; Direct-to-video	
2003	Behind the Red Door	Natalie Haddad		
2003	Imelda	—N/a	Producer only	
2004	The Woodsman	Vicki		
2004	Cavedweller	Delia Byrd	Also executive producer	
2005	Loverboy	Emily Stoll	Also producer	
2007	The Game Plan	Stella Peck		
2008	Justice League: The New Frontier	Lois Lane	Voice; Direct-to-video	
2009	Gamer	Gina Parker Smith		
2012	Man on a Ledge	Suzie Morales		
2012	The Possession	Stephanie Brenek		
2013	Kill Your Darlings	Marian Carr	Uncredited	
2013	Chlorine	Georgie		
2014	The Humbling	Louise Trenner		
2014	Reach Me	Colette		
2014	Big Sky	Dee		
2014	The Road Within	Dr. Mia Rose		
2015	1 Chisper	Stephanie		
2015	Cop Car	Dispatcher Mary Allen		
2016	The Edge of Seventeen	Mona		
2017	Submission	Sherrie Swenson		
2018	After Darkness	Georgina Beaty	Also executive producer	
2019	Villains	Gloria		
2019	Endings, Beginnings	Ingrid		
2022	Space Oddity	—N/a	Director and producer only	
2022	Aristotle and Dante Discover the Secrets of the Universe	—N/a	Producer only	
2024	Bad Shabbos	Ellen		
2025	The Best You Can	Cynthia Rand	Also producer	
2025	Carolina Caroline	Deborah		
2026	Family Movie †	TBA	Post-production; Also director	

Key
†	Denotes films that have not yet been released

== Television ==
Year	Title	Role	Notes	Ref.
1982–1983	Another World	Julia Shearer	Series regular (16 episodes)	
1985	ABC Afterschool Special	Cindy Eller	Episode: "Cindy Eller: A Modern Fairy Tale"	
1985	Miami Vice	Sarah MacPhail	Episode: "Phil the Shill"	
1986	Amazing Stories	Dora Johnson	Episode: "Thanksgiving"	
1988	American Playhouse	Carol	Episode: "Lemon Sky"	
1990	Women & Men: Stories of Seduction	Arlene Megeffin	Television film	
1991	Women & Men 2	Arlene Megeffin	Television film	
1992	Miss Rose White	Rose White	Television film	
1993	Family Pictures	Nina Eberlin	Television film	
1996	Losing Chase	Elizabeth Cole	Television film; also executive producer	
2000	Talk to Me	Janey Munroe	3 episodes; also co-executive producer for episode: "About Taking It Like a Man"	
2001	American Experience	Herself	Episode: "War Letters"	
2002	Ally McBeal	Helena Greene	Episode: "All of Me"	
2002	Stanley	Park Ranger	Voice; Episode: "P.U. Pup"	
2002	The Greatest	Herself	Episode: "100 Sexiest Artists"	
2002	Door to Door	Shelly Soentpiet Brady	Television film	
2003	Queens Supreme	ADA Quinn Coleman	6 episodes	
2004	Something the Lord Made	Mary Blalock	Television film	
2005–2012	The Closer	Deputy Chief Brenda Leigh Johnson	Main role (109 episodes)	
2010	Sesame Street	Camouflage Carla	Episode: "The Camouflage Challenge"	
2014–2020	Brooklyn Nine-Nine	Deputy Chief Madeline Wuntch	Recurring role (12 episodes); also director for episode: "Dillman"	
2015	Proof	—N/a	Executive producer only (10 episodes)	
2017	Story of a Girl	—N/a	Television film; director and producer only	
2017–2018	Ten Days in the Valley	Jane Sadler	Series regular (10 episodes); also executive producer	
2019	Ray Donovan	—N/a	Director only; episode: "The Transfer Agent"	
2019	God Friended Me	—N/a	Director only; episode: "The Road to Damascus"	
2019	Corporate	Mrs. Cowboy	Episode: "The Expense Report"	
2019	Grace and Frankie	—N/a	Director only; episode: "The Aide"	
2019	Girls Weekend	—N/a	Television film; director only	
2019	In the Dark	—N/a	Director only; episode: "Jessica Rabbit"	
2019	City on a Hill	—N/a	Director only; episode: "There Are No Fucking Sides"	
2021	Call Your Mother	Jean Raines	Main role (13 episodes); also co-executive producer	
2022	The Guardians of the Galaxy Holiday Special	Herself	Voice cameo; television special	
2023	The Summer I Turned Pretty	Julia	Series regular (season 2)	
2025	American Dad!	Herself (voice)	Episode: "The Legend of Mike Madonia, the Rototiller Man"	
2026	Carrie	—N/a	Director only; episode: "Physical Education"	

Key
†	Denotes television productions that have not yet been released
