= Story of a Girl =

Story of a Girl may refer to:

- "Absolutely (Story of a Girl)", a 2000 song by Nine Days
- Story of a Girl (novel), a 2007 young-adult novel by Sara Zarr
- Story of a Girl (film), a 2017 TV movie based on the novel
