= Kyra Sedgwick =

American actress (born 1965)

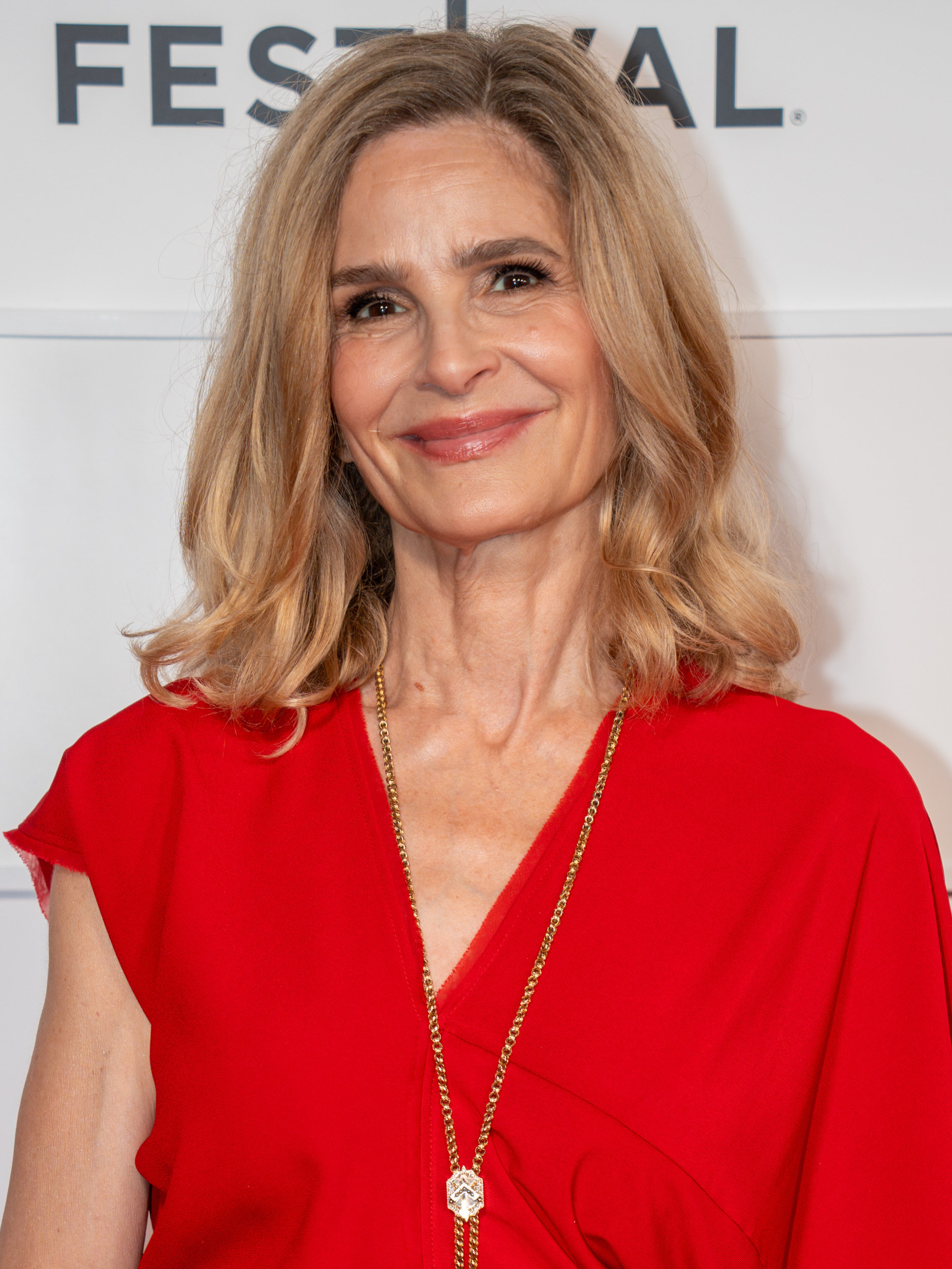
- Sedgwick at the 2025 Tribeca Festival
- Born: Kyra Minturn Sedgwick; August 19, 1965 (age 61); New York City, U.S.
- Education: University of Southern California
- Occupations: Actress; director; producer
- Years active: 1982–present
- Works: Full list
- Spouse: Kevin Bacon (m. 1988)
- Children: 2, including Sosie Bacon
- Family: Sedgwick

Kyra Minturn Sedgwick (/ˈkɪərə ˈsɛdʒwɪk/ KEER-ə SEJ-wik; born August 19, 1965) is an American film and television actress. She is best known for her starring role as Deputy Chief Brenda Leigh Johnson on the crime drama The Closer (2005–2012), for which she won a Golden Globe in 2007 and an Emmy Award in 2010. She also starred in the 1992 TV film Miss Rose White, which won an Emmy Award. She was nominated for a Golden Globe Award for her performance in the 1995 film Something to Talk About. Sedgwick's other film credits include Oliver Stone's Born on the Fourth of July (1989) and Cameron Crowe's Singles (1992). She also had a recurring role as Deputy Chief Madeline Wuntch on the sitcom Brooklyn Nine-Nine.

== Early life and education ==
Sedgwick was born in New York City on August 19, 1965, the daughter of Patricia (née Rosenwald), a speech teacher and educational/family therapist, and Henry Dwight Sedgwick V, a venture capitalist. Her mother was Jewish, and her father was Episcopalian and of English heritage. Sedgwick has identified as Jewish and has stated that she participates in Passover Seders.

A member of the Sedgwick family, she is a descendant of William Ellery, a signatory of the Declaration of Independence, and Ellery Sedgwick, an editor of The Atlantic Monthly. She is the sister of actor Robert Sedgwick, the half-sister of jazz guitarist Mike Stern, the first cousin once removed of actress Edie Sedgwick, and the niece of writer John Sedgwick. She is the aunt of R&B singer George Nozuka, actor Philip Nozuka, and singer/songwriter Justin Nozuka (their mother, Holly, is Sedgwick's half-sister).

Sedgwick's parents separated when she was four and divorced when she was six. She grew up in Upper West Side, Manhattan.

Sedgwick graduated from Friends Seminary and attended Sarah Lawrence College before transferring to the University of Southern California, where she graduated with a theater degree.

== Career ==
Sedgwick obtained her first acting job in 1982 on the television soap opera Another World, portraying Julia Shearer, troubled granddaughter of Liz Matthews. In 1988, she appeared in a TV version of Lanford Wilson's Lemon Sky. In 1989, Sedgwick played the role of Donna in the Oscar-winning Born on the Fourth of July.

Sedgwick played the title role in the Emmy Award–winning 1992 TV film Miss Rose White as a Jewish immigrant who comes to terms with her ethnicity. During the 1990s, she appeared in several Hollywood movies, including Singles (1992), Heart and Souls (1993), Something to Talk About (1995; for which she received a Golden Globe nomination for Best Supporting Actress—Motion Picture), Phenomenon (1996; in which she played the love interest of John Travolta's character), and Critical Care (1997).

Sedgwick has starred alongside her husband Kevin Bacon in Pyrates (1991), The Woodsman (2004), The Guardians of the Galaxy Holiday Special (2022), and The Best You Can (2025). Other film credits include Secondhand Lions (2003), The Game Plan (2007), The Possession (2012), and The Edge of Seventeen (2016).

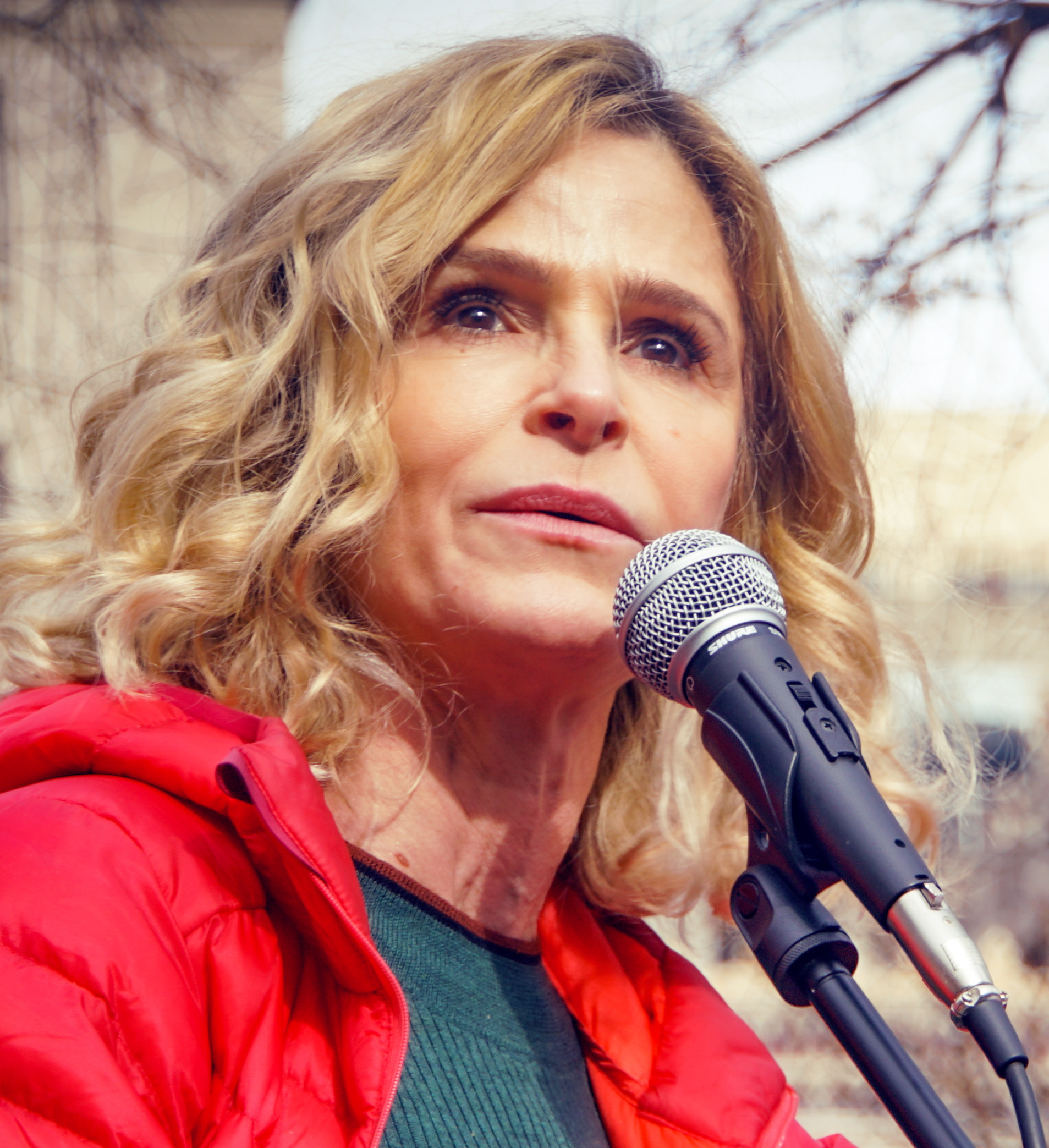
Sedgwick in December 2019

Sedgwick is best known for starring as Brenda Leigh Johnson in the television series The Closer. She played this role from 2005 to 2012. In 2007, she began earning approximately US$300,000 per episode. For this role, Sedgwick earned six consecutive nominations for Golden Globe Award for Best Actress – Television Series Drama (winning once), five consecutive nominations for the Primetime Emmy Award for Outstanding Lead Actress in a Drama Series (winning once), and seven nominations for Screen Actors Guild Award for Outstanding Performance by a Female Actor in a Drama Series. The Closer aired its final episode on August 13, 2012, following the completion of its seventh season; the series's broadcaster TNT stated that the decision to end the series was made by Sedgwick. The first episode of Major Crimes—a sequel series that did not feature Sedgwick, but included many other cast members from The Closer—aired immediately following the final episode of The Closer.

Sedgwick produced the television series Proof for TNT. The show debuted in 2015 and aired for one season. In 2017, Sedgwick made her directorial debut with Story of a Girl, a television film based on the 2007 novel of the same name by Sara Zarr. It starred Sedgwick's husband Kevin Bacon and her daughter Sosie Bacon, and aired on the Lifetime network.

Sedgwick portrayed the character of Madeline Wuntch in the comedy series Brooklyn Nine-Nine. She also played the lead role of Jean Raines in the comedy pilot My Village, written by Kari Lizer. My Village was approved by ABC and re-titled Call Your Mother on May 21, 2020, for the 2020–2021 television season.

In 2023, Sedgwick played the role of Aunt Julia in season 2 of the drama series The Summer I Turned Pretty.

== Personal life ==
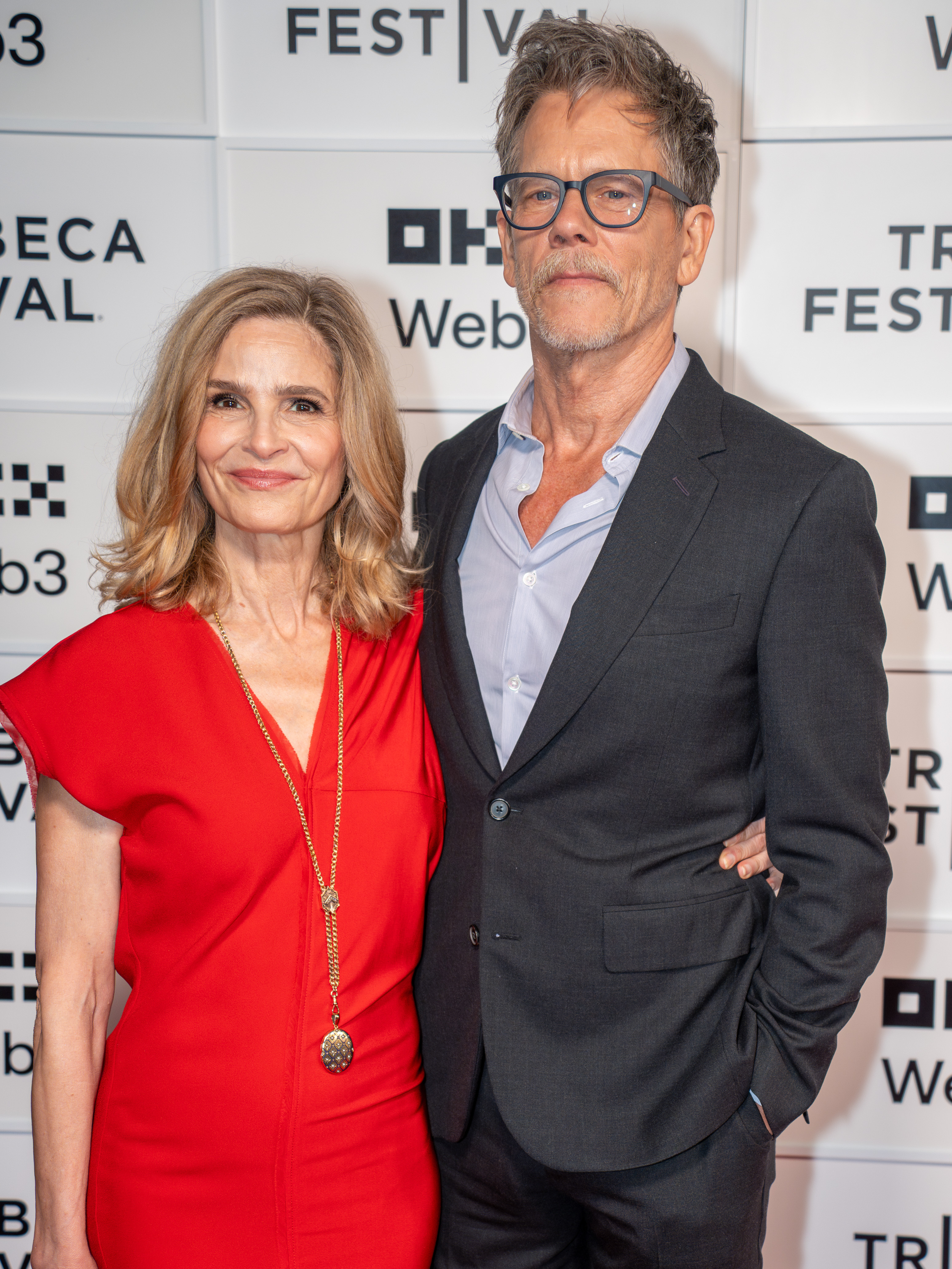
Sedgwick with her husband Kevin Bacon during The Best You Can premiere at the 2025 Tribeca Festival

Sedgwick and Kevin Bacon were married on September 4, 1988, about 18 months after meeting on the set of PBS's adaptation of Lanford Wilson's Lemon Sky. They have two children, Travis Sedgwick Bacon and actress Sosie Bacon. The family splits their time between New York City and the family farm in Connecticut. Sedgwick and Bacon were victims of Bernie Madoff's Ponzi scheme.

== Honors ==
- 2005: Received the Copper Wing Tribute Award presented to her during the Phoenix Film Festival.
- 2009: Inducted into the Hollywood Walk of Fame receiving a star for her contribution to television. The star is located at 6356 Hollywood Boulevard.
- 2013: Honored with the President's Award by the Society of Camera Operators.
- 2017: Received the Independent Spirit John Cassavetes Award, presented to her during the Denver International Film Festival.

== Awards and nominations ==
Association	Year	Category	Title	Result
Alliance of Women Film Journalists Awards	2017	Best Female-Directed Narrative Feature	Story of a Girl	Won
American Comedy Awards	1996	Funniest Supporting Actress in a Motion Picture	Something to Talk About	Nominated
Chicago Film Critics Association Awards	1996	Best Supporting Actress	Something to Talk About	Nominated
Directors Guild Awards	2018	Outstanding Directorial Achievement in Movies for Television/Miniseries	Story of a Girl	Nominated
DVD Exclusive Awards	2001	Best Actress	Labor Pains	Won
Edinburgh International Film Festival	2017	Best International Feature Film	Story of a Girl	Nominated
Edinburgh International Film Festival	2017	Audience Award	Story of a Girl	Nominated
Gold Derby Awards	2006	Drama Lead Actress	The Closer	Nominated
Gold Derby Awards	2007	Drama Lead Actress	The Closer	Nominated
Gold Derby Awards	2008	Drama Lead Actress	The Closer	Nominated
Gold Derby Awards	2015	Comedy Guest Actress	Brooklyn Nine-Nine	Nominated
Golden Globe Awards	1993	Best Actress in a Miniseries or Motion Picture Made for Television	Miss Rose White	Nominated
Golden Globe Awards	1996	Best Supporting Actress in a Motion Picture	Something to Talk About	Nominated
Golden Globe Awards	2006	Best Actress in a Television Series – Drama	The Closer	Nominated
Golden Globe Awards	2007	Best Actress in a Television Series – Drama	The Closer	Won
Golden Globe Awards	2008	Best Actress in a Television Series – Drama	The Closer	Nominated
Golden Globe Awards	2009	Best Actress in a Television Series – Drama	The Closer	Nominated
Golden Globe Awards	2010	Best Actress in a Television Series – Drama	The Closer	Nominated
Golden Globe Awards	2011	Best Actress in a Television Series – Drama	The Closer	Nominated
Gracie Allen Awards	2006	Outstanding Female Lead – Drama Series	The Closer	Won
Independent Spirit Awards	2005	Best Female Lead	Cavedweller	Nominated
MTV Movie + TV Awards	1997	Best Kiss (shared with John Travolta)	Phenomenon	Nominated
People's Choice Awards	2009	Favorite Television Drama Diva	The Closer	Won
Primetime Emmy Awards	2006	Outstanding Lead Actress in a Drama Series	The Closer	Nominated
Primetime Emmy Awards	2007	Outstanding Lead Actress in a Drama Series	The Closer	Nominated
Primetime Emmy Awards	2008	Outstanding Lead Actress in a Drama Series	The Closer	Nominated
Primetime Emmy Awards	2009	Outstanding Lead Actress in a Drama Series	The Closer	Nominated
Primetime Emmy Awards	2010	Outstanding Lead Actress in a Drama Series	The Closer	Won
Satellite Awards	2005	Best Actress in a Series – Drama	The Closer	Won
Satellite Awards	2005	Best Supporting Actress in a Motion Picture – Drama	The Woodsman	Nominated
Satellite Awards	2006	Best Actress in a Series – Drama	The Closer	Won
Satellite Awards	2007	Best Actress in a Series – Drama	The Closer	Nominated
Satellite Awards	2008	Best Actress in a Series – Drama	The Closer	Nominated
Saturn Awards	1994	Best Supporting Actress	Heart and Souls	Nominated
Saturn Awards	2007	Best Actress on Television	The Closer	Nominated
Saturn Awards	2008	Best Actress on Television	The Closer	Nominated
Saturn Awards	2009	Best Actress on Television	The Closer	Nominated
Saturn Awards	2010	Best Actress on Television	The Closer	Nominated
Saturn Awards	2011	Best Actress on Television	The Closer	Nominated
Saturn Awards	2012	Best Actress on Television	The Closer	Nominated
Screen Actors Guild Awards	2006	Outstanding Female Actor in a Drama Series	The Closer	Nominated
Screen Actors Guild Awards	2006	Outstanding Ensemble in a Drama Series	The Closer	Nominated
Screen Actors Guild Awards	2007	Outstanding Female Actor in a Drama Series	The Closer	Nominated
Screen Actors Guild Awards	2008	Outstanding Female Actor in a Drama Series	The Closer	Nominated
Screen Actors Guild Awards	2008	Outstanding Ensemble in a Drama Series	The Closer	Nominated
Screen Actors Guild Awards	2009	Outstanding Female Actor in a Drama Series	The Closer	Nominated
Screen Actors Guild Awards	2009	Outstanding Ensemble in a Drama Series	The Closer	Nominated
Screen Actors Guild Awards	2010	Outstanding Female Actor in a Drama Series	The Closer	Nominated
Screen Actors Guild Awards	2010	Outstanding Ensemble in a Drama Series	The Closer	Nominated
Screen Actors Guild Awards	2011	Outstanding Female Actor in a Drama Series	The Closer	Nominated
Screen Actors Guild Awards	2011	Outstanding Ensemble in a Drama Series	The Closer	Nominated
Screen Actors Guild Awards	2012	Outstanding Female Actor in a Drama Series	The Closer	Nominated
Television Critics Association Awards	2006	Individual Achievement in Drama	The Closer	Nominated
TV Guide Awards	2012	Favorite Actress	The Closer	Nominated
