= Story of a Girl (novel) =

Book by Sara Zarr

- Author: Sara Zarr
- Cover artist: Roger Hagadone
- Language: English
- Genre: Young adult literature
- Publisher: Little, Brown, Bloomsbury Publishing
- Publication date: 10 January 2007 (hardcover); 1 February 2008 (paperback)
- Publication place: United States
- Pages: 192

Story of a Girl is a 2007 young-adult novel by Sara Zarr. The story follows Deanna Lambert, a 16-year-old girl from Pacifica in the San Francisco Bay Area who struggles with slut shaming, gossip, and sexuality. The novel was a finalist for the National Book Award, and was adapted into a Lifetime movie also titled Story of a Girl in 2017.

== Plot ==
The story centers around Deanna Lambert, a 16-year-old girl troubled by social exile and branding rumors. When she was thirteen, her father caught her and her brother's friend, 17-year-old Tommy Webber, having unprotected sex in the back of Tommy's Buick. Word gets around by Tommy, and Deanna is named the 'school slut'. Her father becomes distant and cold towards her, never showing any affection after what he witnessed.

Three years later, Deanna still lives in her hometown of Pacifica, California. Her affair with Tommy Webber is still a popular gossip topic and her older brother, Darren, and his girlfriend, Stacy, now live in their basement with their child, April. Keeping a fantasy of moving out of the house with Darren, April and Stacy in her mind and coming to a happy home, Deanna gets a summer job at a ratty pizza parlor, Picasso's Pizza, while also dealing with inhibited feelings of affection for her best friend, Jason, who is dating her other friend, Lee.

As the summer progresses, Deanna's secret love of Jason deepens. She begins to become more and more envious of Lee, especially of Lee's happy home and inner peace. One day, Deanna finds that Stacy fled the house, leaving April behind, and does not return. At the same time, she develops a friendship with her boss at Picasso's, Michael, while working alongside Tommy Webber. One evening, Michael gives Deanna a ride home from work and Deanna's father grows suspicious of Michael's motives. Deanna then lashes out at her father for never again trusting her after he caught Deanna and Tommy in the car, which causes her father to temporarily leave.

At the end of the story Deanna reconciles with Lee and Jason (after hanging out with only Jason while Lee was on a weekend trip, which ultimately led to Deanna kissing him and asking him why he never asked her out); Stacy suddenly arrives home (it is revealed that she left only intending to party before returning to motherhood); and Deanna decides to truly move on from the affair she had so long ago. Coincidentally, her father also returns to his family and moves on from the past.

The story ends with Deanna explaining to Darren and Stacy (who have found an apartment and are going to move in there with April) that she has worked with Tommy for the whole summer. Stacy promises that, while Deanna cannot move in with them, there will always be a toothbrush and understanding people there for her. Soon, school has begun again, and Deanna, Jason, and Lee are now juniors. They ask her if she is ready for the new year, and although Deanna says that she is not ready, Lee tells her it is time to begin it.

== Characters ==
- Deanna Lambert – The main character of the book. When she was only 13 her father caught her and Tommy Webber nearly having sex in the back of his car. Since then she was labeled the "school slut" and her father became unloving, distant, and weird towards her. She is longing to escape the label that people have put on her, and she just wants to enjoy high school without having to be reminded of her past.
- Jason – Deanna's best friend since childhood and her love interest. He is dating her other best friend Lee. Deanna has feelings for him and is somewhat jealous of Lee.
- Lee – Deanna's best friend whom she met in gym during high school. She is very religious and does not curse or swear. She is dating Jason, after Deanna introduced him to her.
- Tommy Webber – Darren's ex-best friend. He was in a relationship with Deanna when she was 13 and he was 17. The day after they were caught having sex by her father he told a lie about what happened to his friends which caused Deanna to be labeled a slut by nearly everybody in all of Pacifica.
- Darren Lambert – Deanna's older brother. He is very protective of her ever since she was found with Tommy. He is not married to Stacy, the mother of his daughter April. He wants to move into their own place instead of living in his parents' basement.
- Stacy – Darren's girlfriend. She got pregnant at 18 with April and moved in with Darren because her mother kicked her out.
- April – Darren and Stacy's baby girl. Deanna loves her very much.
- Michael – The gay owner of Picasso's Pizza, where Deanna finds a summer job. He befriends her and helps her realize Tommy's not important and gives her rides home, making Deanna's father ask if he is a pedophile.
- Ray Lambert – Darren and Deanna's father and Debbie's husband. Ray is disappointed in Deanna for having sex with Tommy. Ray refuses to forgive his daughter and he doesn't trust her anymore.
- Debbie Lambert – Darren and Deanna's mother and Ray's wife. Unlike her husband Ray has forgiven Deanna for having sex with Tommy. She is able to trust her daughter again. Mrs. Lamber works a low paying retail job at Mervyns.

== Awards ==
- 2007 National Book Award Finalist
- American Library Association Best Book for Young Adults
- ALA Quick Pick for Reluctant Readers
- New York Public Library Book for the Teen Age
- Utah Book Award Finalist

== TV movie adaptation ==
Producers Emily Bickford Lansbury and Kyra Sedgwick have optioned the film. Laurie Collyer wrote the first draft of the screenplay and Emily Bickford Lansbury wrote the final version. Kevin Bacon, Jon Tenney and Ryann Shane, star in the film. The movie will be released through LifeTime on June 23, 2017. Mary-Kate Olsen was scheduled to co-star as Stacy, but after filming Beastly in 2011 she retired from acting for good to focus on her fashion career with her sister Ashley Olsen. Mary-Kate was replaced by Sosie Bacon as Stacy.
