= Sunlight Jr. =

2013 film

- Film poster
- Directed by: Laurie Collyer
- Written by: Laurie Collyer
- Starring: Naomi Watts; Matt Dillon
- Cinematography: Igor Martinovic
- Music by: J Mascis
- Release dates: April 20, 2013 (Tribeca); November 15, 2013 (US)
- Running time: 90 minutes
- Country: United States
- Language: English

Sunlight Jr. is a 2013 American drama film directed by Laurie Collyer and starring Naomi Watts and Matt Dillon. The film is a poignant vignette following a couple expecting their first child. The couple must come to grips with their dire financial situation while in the midst of an unplanned pregnancy and its subsequent challenges. The film is inspired by Barbara Ehrenreich's non-fiction book Nickel and Dimed which investigates many of the difficulties low-wage workers face.

== Plot ==
Unmarried lovers Melissa, a convenience store clerk, and Richie, who uses a wheelchair following a motorcycle accident, try to make ends meet on her low wages and his disability check which he supplements with occasional handyman work. Their dire situation is illustrated early in the film when Richie is stranded in his car because he has run out of gas, yet he keeps spending money in bars. Soon they face eviction for non-payment of rent from the seedy motel in which they live, and an unplanned pregnancy for which they can't afford the medical bills. As a last resort they move in with Melissa's alcoholic mother who makes money by taking foster children into her bedbug infested home.

== Cast ==
- Naomi Watts as Melissa Winters
- Matt Dillon as Richie Barnes
- Norman Reedus as Justin
- Tess Harper as Kathleen
- Antoni Corone as Edwin
- Adrienne Lovette as Vivian
- Vivian Fleming-Alvarez as Store Patron (uncredited)
- Keith Hudson as Micky
- Chloe Pombo as Foster Child
- Gustavo Escobar as Jeral
- Victoria Vodar as Pretty Woman (uncredited)
- Rachael Thompson as Crime and Punishment Woman
- Beth Marshall as Molly
- Gabriel Alexander as Kyle (uncredited)

== Reception ==
On the review aggregator website Rotten Tomatoes, 63% of 38 critics' reviews are positive, with an average rating of 5.9/10. On Metacritic, the film holds an average score of 61 out of 100, based on 19 reviews, which indicates "generally favorable reviews".

Ronnie Scheib of Variety praised the film, saying "Incandescent performances by Naomi Watts and Matt Dillon and an unerring grasp of strip-mall-dominated Florida distinguish Sunlight Jr." Frank Scheck of The Hollywood Reporter wrote: "Naomi Watts and Matt Dillon bring impressive emotional and physical heat to Sunlight Jr., director/screenwriter Laurie Collyer's beautifully observed character study of an unmarried couple living on the economic margins."

== Awards ==
The Tribeca Film Festival nominated writer direction Laurie Collyer in the category "Best Narrative Feature".
