= Expats (miniseries) =

2024 American drama television miniseries

- Promotional poster
- Genre: Drama
- Created by: Lulu Wang
- Based on: The Expatriates by Janice Y. K. Lee
- Directed by: Lulu Wang
- Starring: Nicole Kidman; Sarayu Blue; Ji-young Yoo; Brian Tee; Tiana Gowen; Bodhi del Rosario; Ruby Ruiz; Amelyn Pardenilla; Jack Huston
- Music by: Alex Weston
- Country of origin: United States
- Original language: English
- No. of episodes: 6

Production
- Executive producers: Lulu Wang; Daniele Melia; Nicole Kidman; Per Saari; Alice Bell; Stan Wlodkowski; Theresa Park
- Producer: Janice Y. K. Lee
- Production location: Hong Kong
- Cinematography: Anna Franquesa-Solano
- Editors: Matthew Friedman; Alex O'Flinn
- Running time: 53–100 minutes
- Production companies: Blossom Films; Local Time; Picrow; Amazon MGM Studios

Original release
- Network: Amazon Prime Video
- Release: January 26 – February 23, 2024

Expats is an American drama television miniseries created and directed by Lulu Wang, based on the 2016 novel The Expatriates by Janice Y. K. Lee. It premiered on Amazon Prime Video on January 26, 2024. It stars Nicole Kidman as Margaret Woo, an American expatriate living in Hong Kong when tragedy befalls her family. The show was filmed from August 2021 to December 2022.

== Premise ==
Expats follows "the vibrant lives of a close-knit expatriate community: where affluence is celebrated, friendships are intense but knowingly temporary, and personal lives, deaths and marriages are played out publicly—then retold with glee."

== Cast ==
=== Main ===
- Nicole Kidman as Margaret Woo, a housewife and former landscape designer
- Sarayu Blue as Hilary Starr, whose birth name is Harpreet Singh
- Ji-young Yoo as Mercy Cho, a Korean-American Columbia University graduate and youngest of the three women
- Brian Tee as Clarke Woo, Margaret's husband
- Tiana Gowen as Daisy Woo, Margaret's oldest child and only daughter
- Bodhi del Rosario as Philip Woo, Margaret's older son
- Ruby Ruiz as Essie, the Woo family's Filipina nanny
- Amelyn Pardenilla as Puri, Hilary's Filipina housekeeper
- Jack Huston as David Starr, Hilary's troubled English husband

=== Guest starring ===
- Blessing Mokgohloa as Pastor Alan Mambo
- Flora Chan as Olivia Chu
- Bonde Sham as Charly, a protester in the Umbrella Movement
- Will Or as Tony Ng, a protester in the Umbrella Movement
- Lesley Chiang as Philena Song
- Grace Wong as Priscilla
- Kenneth Chan as Max
- Maggie Lee as Wen Ng, Tony Ngʻs mother, a local grocery store worker

== Episodes ==
No.	Title	Directed by	Teleplay by	Original release date
1	"The Peak"	Lulu Wang	Lulu Wang	January 26, 2024
Margaret, Hilary, and Mercy are three American expatriate women living in Hong Kong. Margaret lives the city for her husband Clarke's work alongside their children Philip and Daisy. She plans Clarke's 50th birthday party while she and her family struggle to move past the loss of three-year-old son Gus. She tries to heal a rift between herself and her friend Hilary by inviting her and her husband David to the party. Meanwhile, Mercy is having an affair with David. The night of Clarke's birthday, Hilary and David argue on the way to the party and David gets out of the car. Clarke's parents and brother urge him and Margaret to return to the United States. Mercy helps to cater the event and runs away from the party when she realizes Clarke is the host. Margaret sees her and struggles to keep up appearances as Clark gives a speech to the partygoers. She angrily confronts a server after mistaking her for Mercy. After the party Margaret accepts a ride home from Hilary and they reconnect. At her request, Hilary takes Margaret to the market where Gus disappeared. They return to their building and Margaret has a panic attack seeing police cars outside, but Hilary learns they are there because her elderly neighbor Christopher died. Hilary returns to her apartment and her housekeeper Puri informs her David has not returned home. Philip finds his drawing that his mother confiscated-- their whole family with Gus next to Jesus-- and posts it on the refrigerator.
2	"Mongkok"	Lulu Wang	Alice Bell	January 26, 2024
One year earlier, Hilary tours an orphanage while she and David try to have children. At a party on a yacht, Mercy and Margaret meet and become friends. Later, Margaret vents to Hilary that her long-time nanny Essie is overstepping her boundaries with her children. Hilary admits that she has secretly started taking birth control pills, explaining that she and David agreed not to have children but David changed his mind. Margaret encourages her to move forward with her own experience of having an unplanned third child. Margaret calls Mercy to join her when she takes her children on an excursion to a night market; Mercy views the outing as a job interview. David visits a nearby bar despite his attempts to stay sober. The group separates when Mercy takes Philip and Gus forward while Margaret stays with Daisy admire one of the stalls. Mercy is briefly distracted by a text. When she looks up, Gus is gone. Mercy and Philip are unable to find him before Margaret catches up with them. Gus is reported missing. As police search the scene, Clarke and Margaret grieve and David is interrogated. He introduces himself to a guilt-ridden Mercy and takes her home. In the present, life goes on in the market where Gus disappeared.
3	"Mid-Levels"	Lulu Wang	Vera Miao	February 2, 2024
Christopher is discovered to have a photo of Gus on his phone that neither Margaret nor Essie can remember taking. Mercy continues to be plagued by guilt but makes a new friend, Charly. David has begun living at a hotel and voices his frustration with Hilary's suspicion that he was involved with Gus's disappearance to Mercy. Margaret becomes convinced the photo is the key to finding Gus, fixating on a scar on his elbow she did not tell the police about. Clarke secretly attends Baptist services despite their family being atheists. Hilary realizes David is cheating on her after he sends her an explicit text meant for Mercy. Margaret photographs her children's scars and birthmarks for identification, sowing tension in the family. Hilary hosts a dinner party while claiming that David is absent due to a gym injury. Margaret shows up at the party asking for a key to Christopher's apartment, which Hilary angrily hands over. Clarke spontaneously adopts a dog from his church, delighting his children. Mercy calls her estranged mother and invites her to visit her. Hilary finally confronts David at a bar and tell him she is willing to forgive him, but they end up arguing and breaking apart. David shows up drunk at Mercy's apartment and spends the night. Margaret raids Christopher's belongings and finds a postcard from Thailand on the same beach Gus got his scar. She triumphantly returns home; but is greeted by detectives who tell her a body matching Gus's description has been discovered on mainland China. Clarke and Margaret leave for Shenzhen to identify the body.
4	"Mainland"	Lulu Wang	Gursimran Sandhu	February 9, 2024
Margaret and Clarke arrive at the morgue, but the process is stalled as the employees only speak Mandarin. Hilary's mother Brinder visits and they get stuck in an elevator for hours with her neighbor Tilda. Brinder hounds her daughter for her childlessness and lack of contact. Hilary in turn criticizes her mother for tolerating her father's infidelity. She admits that David has left her, but Brinder is unsympathetic. Tilda awkwardly listens before the elevator is fixed. After inadvertently shaming her for losing Gus, David confides in Mercy that he accidentally paralyzed his twin brother when they were roughhousing as children (Note: The incident is alluded to in the first episode's opening narration, but without identifying details.) and they console each other. As David prepares to leave, Mercy suddenly vomits. David considers that she is pregnant and buys three tests. She begrudgingly takes one and it's positive. David leaves Mercy's apartment while they both process the information. While the Woos are waiting, their frustration boils over and they begin arguing about who is to blame for losing Gus. Clarke speculates that he was taken by the black market for being ethnically ambiguous and Margaret confronts him about going to church. She clings to the possibility of finding Gus alive while Clarke says they should return to the United States. They are at last able to view the body. It is not Gus's. Margaret holds Clarke as he breaks down crying. All three women are hit by a rainstorm.
5	"Central"	Lulu Wang	Lulu Wang	February 16, 2024
In the midst a Sunday typhoon, Essie calls her son and his family in the Philippines. Puri meets with her friends and they gossip about their employers. Hilary tells her friend Olivia Chu she is divorcing David. Olivia tries to talk her out of it to save face, but her husband Max expresses approval of the divorce. Clarke is visited by Pastor Alan Mambo. He admits that having wished that the body was Gus's for the sake of having closure. Margaret arrives home and shuts down Alan's attempts to comfort her. Charly and her friend Tony participate in the Umbrella Movement and she scolds him for skipping an important exam to protest. His mother Wen also discourages him from protesting. Essie contemplates retiring and returning to the Philippines, but her attachment to the Woos makes her hesitant. David goes home to tell Hilary his lover is pregnant and Puri witnesses her throw him out. David returns to his hotel and a blackout hits the city. Olivia is upset when Max leaves the house in the storm, ostensibly to go to work. A leak breaks a ceiling in her house and she hastily tries to patch it. Alan is stranded at the Woos for the night. He tells the story of suffering a crisis of faith after his first marriage failed, but returning to the church to bring hope to others. An argument arises in the family as the kids want an explanation for Gus's disappearance. Margaret, sick of the contention, agrees that it is time to return to the United States. Essie calls her family to tell them she will be returning home permanently. Tony is arrested as protests grow violent. Hilary helps Puri prepare for an upcoming singing competition. They drink wine and Puri confesses her knowledge that Mercy is David's lover. Charly and Mercy sneak into the hotel pool and impulsively kiss while swimming. Mercy ends up confessing to losing Gus and Charly consoles her. In the morning, Margaret tells Essie about the move and apologizes for preventing Essie from accompanying her to the night market, explaining that she was jealous of Essie's bond with her children. However, she also asks Essie to come to the United States with them. Essie noncommittally agrees to think it over. Charly receives a frantic call from Wen and leaves in a hurry. The city recovers from the storm.
6	"Home"	Lulu Wang	Janice Y. K. Lee	February 23, 2024
The Woos prepare for their move. Mercy explores her budding relationship with Charly, but hides her pregnancy from her. After several months without contact, David shows up at Mercy's building. She bluntly tells him she is raising the baby on her own. Mercy finally tells Charly about the pregnancy. Charly angrily ends their relationship and tells her to stop blaming others for her problems. Hilary visits her mother and dying father in America. She is surprised that Brinder has invited her husband's mistress and their children to visit. She properly meets her half-siblings Fauja and Suhki for the first time. In the hospital, Hilary lies and tells her father she is pregnant with a boy. She angrily denounces him for abusing her mother while being a loving father to his other children as he enters surgery. Hilary's father dies and she returns to Hong Kong, David meeting her at the airport. Hilary breaks down from guilt knowing her last words to her father were that she hated him. David confides that his future in his child's life is uncertain and Hilary consents to him giving Mercy her contact information. They part ways on amicable terms. The women hold three separate one-on-one lunches with each other. Hilary voices her fear about her future alone, Margaret her resentment and despair, and Mercy her fears about failing her unborn daughter. Mercy's mother Hae-soon visits. At the Hong Kong airport, Margaret gets cold feet and refuses to get on the plane. Her family, including Essie, goes on without her for the time being. Margaret walks through the streets of Hong Kong with a renewed sense of hope.

== Production ==
=== Development ===
On February 7, 2017, it was reported that Blossom Films had optioned the screen rights to Janice Y. K. Lee's novel The Expatriates with the intention of developing it into a television series. Alice Bell was attached to write the adaptation. Executive producers were expected to consist of Nicole Kidman, Per Saari, and Theresa Park with Lee set to serve as a consulting producer. Alongside Blossom Films, production companies involved with the production were slated to include POW! Productions.

On July 28, 2018, it was announced that Amazon had given the production a series order. On January 11, 2019, it was announced that Melanie Marnich had joined Bell as co-showrunner and executive producer for the series. In December 2019, it was announced Lulu Wang would serve as an executive producer on the series, while also writing and directing multiple episodes.

=== Casting ===
Alongside the initial development announcement, it was reported that Nicole Kidman would star in the series. In May 2021, Ji-young Yoo was cast in the series. In June 2021, Jack Huston and Sarayu Blue joined the cast. In September 2021, Brian Tee joined the cast.

=== Filming ===
Filming for the series commenced in August 2021 and wrapped in December 2022. The series was shot in locations such as luxury restaurants in The Murray, PMQ, Sevva in Prince's Building. Other locations included Mei Foo Sun Chuen, Lok Wah Estate, Ladies Market in Mong Kok, Cheung Sing Restaurant in Tai Hang, Victoria Harbour and the historic Mido Café. The filming in Hong Kong caused controversy because Nicole Kidman was allowed to bypass the straight quarantine rules, angering many local residents who were not allowed to move around freely after entering Hong Kong without mandated hotel quarantine.

== Release ==
The series premiered on January 26, 2024. It is not available in Hong Kong itself.

== Differences from the book ==
Expats makes multiple changes to major characters from the book. In The Expatriates, Margaret is a quarter-Korean woman with a white husband, while in the show she is a white woman with an Asian husband. Hilary, a white woman in the book, is portrayed by the Indian-American Sarayu Blue. Essie and Puri, Margaret and Hilary's respective housekeepers, are only side characters in the book, while the series gives them a larger role. The show changes Charlie, Mercy's male friend from Columbia, to Charly, a female native of Hong Kong. Also absent is Julian, a young boy Hilary adopts in the book.

The series also shifts the location and timing of certain events. In The Expatriates, Gus vanishes during a family vacation to Seoul, which Expats changes to a Hong Kong marketplace. Consequently, much of the show focuses on Margaret's paranoia about her neighbors' potential involvement with the disappearance, which does not happen in the book.

The ending of Expats makes several changes to the book. The book ends with Hilary and Margaret visiting Mercy in the hospital with her new baby, while the show ends with her still pregnant. Most notably, Margaret in the book can achieve closure without knowing her son's fate, while the show ends more ambiguously, with Margaret deciding to remain in Hong Kong for the foreseeable future. Series creator Lulu Wang said she interpreted the ending as Margaret splitting her time between Hong Kong and America and choosing to continue searching for Gus as an immigrant rather than an expat.

== Reception ==
=== Critical response ===
The review aggregator website Rotten Tomatoes reported an 85% approval rating, with an average rating of 7.3/10, based on 59 critic reviews. The website's critics consensus reads, "By turns emotionally devastating and icy, Expats is a challenging drama made riveting by an ace cast and creator Lulu Wang's deft direction." On Metacritic, the series holds a weighted average score of 72 out of 100, based on 21 critics, indicating "generally favorable reviews".

The series received generally positive reviews from critics who praised the performances of the cast; however, Nicole Kidman's performance divided critics. While Isabella Soares of Collider called it "Nicole Kidman's Best TV Performance", Lucy Mangan of The Guardian commented that "the feeling that [Nicole Kidman] is running on the fumes of her talent is hard to avoid". David Tusing of The National News noted that while Nicole Kidman "shines as Margaret", "the star of the show" is Sarayu Blue, "who delivers a career-defining performance as someone torn between expectations and her own desires".

Saloni Gajjar of The A.V. Club said "Nicole Kidman is the big hook, of course, but Kidman isn’t the only marvel. Her co-stars, Sarayu Blue and Ji-young Yoo, are equally powerful, helping to tell a profound story about grief, loss, and the burden of trying to move on". Gautam Sunder of The Hindu recommended that "Expats should make the case for Nicole Kidman to cement her reign as the queen of current-day prestige television dramas". Steve Murray of Arts Atl criticized the casting as "Nicole Kidman is playing a character at least 10 years younger than her actual age. It strains credibility in a show that already feels synthetic".

Ben Travers of IndieWire said "Expats expertly breaks life down into parts, before bringing it all together again in a moving, unshakable portrait." Fletcher Peters of The Daily Beast observed that this show “continues to present Kidman as one of the most gripping actresses in TV—if not the most gripping. This won’t be the first review — nor the last — to praise Kidman in particular. But it must be said: She’s an absolute revelation as Margaret. Insecure about her living situation but confident about her wealth, emotional but never over-the-top, understated but powerful, Margaret has a handful of intricacies that Kidman perfectly balances.”

One of the most common criticisms of Nicole Kidman's performance was that her playing a depressed middle-aged white woman had become a tired trope. Joel Keller of Decider said, "Nicole Kidman feels like she's in the phase of her career when she playing one depressed, wealthy, touched-by-tragedy middle-aged wife and mom after another, and while her performances are always terrific, the trope has gotten old"; "the only thing we can think of is Big Little Lies or The Undoing, and that it's the same story in a different locale". Josh Bell of CBR concurred and noted that "Nicole Kidman has now played variations on this same fragile upper-class housewife several times, and she doesn't bring a new approach to this particular character", and "Amazon's Expats is more of a luxurious soap opera than a crime drama, and its meandering focus is one reason it ends up a disappointment". Janet Paskin of Bloomberg said of the series that "it’s bleak, and it’s boring. Not a lot happens. The characters agonize, make predictably unfortunate decisions and say things they regret. Overall, they hold themselves apart. Their deepest thoughts are expressed in voiceover, not to other people".

=== Controversies ===
Amazon Prime's decision to produce two series in Hong Kong about expatriates – the other one being Exciting Times – was criticised as being insensitive towards the city which was suffering from a rapidly deteriorating political situation under the Hong Kong national security law imposed by the government of the People's Republic of China. Hong Kong's newspaper of record, the South China Morning Post, referred to the series as "tone deaf" and out of touch, because author Janice Y. K. Lee is the daughter of Korean immigrants who left Hong Kong for the US with her family when she was 15.

Leading actor Nicole Kidman's exemption from the city's mandatory 21-day in-hotel quarantine regime was also criticised as she arrived by private jet with bodyguards on August 12, 2021, while the Hong Kong authorities responded that the quarantine exemption was granted "for the purpose of performing designated professional work, taking into account that it is conducive to maintaining the necessary operation and development of Hong Kong's economy". Residents objected to what they considered grossly unfair treatment, and internet users also reacted negatively. Several lawmakers expressed concern over the exemption inside the legislature. Responding to the controversy, Secretary for Commerce and Economic Development Edward Yau denied that the exemption violated existing policies, and said that the crew would have to be fully vaccinated and comply with quarantine exemption requirements identical to those made available to bankers. While one person said that the series would bring good publicity and jobs to Hong Kong, dissident artist Badiucao said that "the communist-backed regime would use it as a soft propaganda program that will sugarcoat the lies in Hong Kong".

=== Accolades ===
The series appeared on multiple critics and editors' lists of the best TV of 2024, including:

- 1st – Harper's Bazaar
- 1st – Christian Blauvelt of IndieWire
- 4th – IndieWire
- 8th – Erin Strecker of IndieWire
- Top 10 – Sarah Shachat of IndieWire
- One of the best TV shows of 2024 – Vogue
- One of the best TV shows of 2024 – Vanity Fair

== Awards and nominations ==
Year	Award	Date of ceremony	Category	Recipient(s) and nominee(s)	Result	Ref.
2024	Gotham TV Awards	June 4, 2024	Outstanding Performance in a Limited Series	Ji-young Yoo	Nominated	
2024	Gotham TV Awards	June 4, 2024	Spotlight Tribute	Lulu Wang	Won	
2024	IndieWire Honors	June 6, 2024	Crossover Award	Lulu Wang	Won	
2024	Online Film & Television Association	October 6, 2024	Best Actress in a Motion Picture, Limited or Anthology Series	Nicole Kidman	Nominated	
2024	Online Film & Television Association	October 6, 2024	Best Supporting Actor in a Motion Picture, Limited or Anthology Series	Jack Huston	Nominated	
2024	Online Film & Television Association	October 6, 2024	Best Casting & Ensemble in a Motion Picture, Limited or Anthology Series	Expats	Nominated	
2024	Online Film & Television Association	October 6, 2024	Best Direction of a Motion Picture or Limited Series	Lulu Wang	Nominated	
2024	Online Film & Television Association	October 6, 2024	Best Writing of a Motion Picture or Limited Series	Expats	Nominated	
2025	Satellite Awards	January 26, 2025	Best Actress – Miniseries or Television Film	Nicole Kidman	Nominated	
2025	Visual Effects Society Awards	February 11, 2025	Outstanding Supporting Visual Effects in a Photoreal Episode	Robert Bock, Glorivette Somoza, Charles Labbé, Tim Emeis (for "Home")	Nominated	
2025	AWGIE Awards	February 13, 2025	Television – Limited Series	Alice Bell, Lulu Wang, Janice Y. K. Lee, Gursimran Sandhu, and Vera Miao	Nominated	
2025	Independent Spirit Awards	February 22, 2025	Best Supporting Performance in a New Scripted Series	Brian Tee	Nominated	
2025	GLAAD Media Award	March 27, 2025	Outstanding Limited or Anthology Series	Expats	Nominated	
