= Wyrm (film) =

2020 film by Christopher Winterbauer

- Theatrical release poster
- Directed by: Christopher Winterbauer
- Written by: Christopher Winterbauer
- Produced by: Helen Estabrook
- Starring: Theo Taplitz
- Cinematography: John Guleserian
- Edited by: Nathan Orloff
- Music by: David Boman
- Production company: A Thousand Ships
- Distributed by: Vertical Entertainment
- Release dates: September 21, 2019 (Fantastic Fest); June 10, 2022 (U.S.)
- Running time: 97 minutes
- Country: United States
- Language: English

Wyrm is a 2019 American surrealist dark comedy science fiction film written and directed by Christopher Winterbauer in his feature-length directorial debut. It is based on Winterbauer's short film of the same name and stars Theo Taplitz as the titular Wyrm, an awkward teenager who attends a dystopian school where students wear electronic collars that can only be detached once they have experienced their first kiss.

== Cast ==
- Theo Taplitz as Wyrm
- Lulu Wilson as Izzy
- Cece Abbey as Becky
- Lukas Gage as Dylan
- Azure Brandi as Myrcella
- Sosie Bacon as Lindsey
- Rosemarie DeWitt as Margie
- Tommy Dewey as Uncle Chet
- Natasha Rothwell as V.P. Lister
- Dan Bakkedahl as Allen
- Jenna Ortega as Suzie

== Release ==
Wyrm premiered at Fantastic Fest on September 21, 2019. It was shown at the 2020 Florida Film Festival, where it won Best Narrative Feature, and the 2021 Seattle International Film Festival. It was given a limited theatrical release by Vertical Entertainment in the U.S. on June 10, 2022.

== Reception ==
The film has an 89% rating on Rotten Tomatoes based on 19 reviews. Reuben Baron of Comic Book Resources wrote that "the worldbuilding in Wyrm, expanded from a short film of the same name, is brilliant".
