= Ryann Shane =

American actress

- Born: July 4, 1993 (age 33)
- Occupation: Actress
- Years active: 2004–present

Ryann Shane (born July 4, 1993) is an American actress best known for her role as Deva Hopewell in the Cinemax series Banshee.

== Life and career ==
Shane grew up with a close relationship with her father. She made her acting debut in 2004, in a short film called Superstore. Shane appeared in Definitely, Maybe alongside Ryan Reynolds in 2008. She played a daughter of an ex-boxer with dementia in the 2011 series Lights Out. In 2012, Shane was cast as Deva Hopewell, the rebellious teenage daughter of Carrie and Gordon Hopewell, in the Cinemax show Banshee. The show ran for four seasons from 2013 to 2016. In 2017, she starred as Deanna Lambert, a teenager whose sex tape with an older boy made her a pariah, in Story of a Girl. Sara Zarr, author of the novel on which the film was based, met with Shane and praised her performance. Shane beat out hundreds of other actresses for the part.

== Filmography ==
=== Film ===
Year	Title	Role	Notes
2004	Superstore	Stacey	Short film
2008	Definitely, Maybe	School kid	
2009	Amelia	Young Amelia	
2012	Frances Ha	Crying Girl	
2017	Story of a Girl	Deanna Lambert	

=== Television ===
Year	Title	Role	Notes
2011	Blue Bloods	Chloe Carson	1 episode
2011	Lights Out	Daniella Leary	Main role
2012	Law & Order: Special Victims Unit	Ashley Riggs	1 episode
2013–2016	Banshee	Deva Hopewell	Main role, 32 episodes
2017	Gone	Ruth	1 episode
2018–2022	Law & Order: Special Victims Unit	Mia Morino	2 episodes
