= Ji-young Yoo =

American actress (born 1999)

- Yoo in 2026
- Born: SunHee Seo; July 22, 1999 (age 27); Denver, Colorado, U.S.
- Occupation: Actress
- Years active: 2020–present

Korean name
- Hangul: 서선희
- RR: Seo Seonhui
- MR: Sŏ Sŏnhŭi

Stage name
- Hangul: 유지영
- RR: Yu Jiyeong
- MR: Yu Chiyŏng

SunHee Seo (Korean: 서선희; born July 22, 1999), known professionally as Ji-young Yoo (Korean: 유지영), is an American actress. She first appeared in the 2021 Netflix comedy-drama film Moxie, credited by her birth name. In the same year, she adopted the stage name Ji-young Yoo, consisting of Korean syllables that she believed would be easier to pronounce for English speakers.

In 2023, Yoo won the Best Performance in a U.S. Narrative Feature accolade at the Tribeca Festival. She dropped out of her degree program at the University of Southern California to film the 2024 Amazon Prime Video original miniseries Expats, for which she earned an Outstanding Performance in a Limited Series nomination at the Gotham Awards. In 2025, she portrayed Megan, one of the main characters in Until Dawn, a horror film adapted from the 2015 video game of the same name. The film received generally mixed reviews, but various critics praised Yoo's character and performance. She also provided the voice of Zoey in the 2025 animated Netflix film KPop Demon Hunters, which became the platform's most-viewed film of all time.

== Early life and education ==
SunHee Seo was born on July 22, 1999 to Korean immigrants in Denver, Colorado. She has trained in dancing since she was three years old. In high school, she attended Colorado Academy and was listed as "SunHee Morgan Seo" in its 2017 journal. She also trained at the Denver Center for the Performing Arts and the Perry-Mansfield Performing Arts School & Camp. She pursued a degree in Cinema and Media at the University of Southern California, but at 21, dropped out to film Expats before she could graduate. In an interview with Douglas Greenwood of i-D, published on April 24, 2025, she expressed a desire to complete her degree in the future, although she had no concrete plans, due to the high cost of education in the United States.

She adopted the stage name Ji-young Yoo partly to draw a line between her personal life and business life, and partly because many people continually mispronounced her birth name. According to Yoo, others told her that her name was "hard" to pronounce and suggested she change it. She specifically chose syllables for her stage name that were easy to pronounce for English speakers but still Korean. In an interview with Rebecca Sun of The Hollywood Reporter, Yoo said, "I hope we have moved past the period where Asian Americans felt a need to assimilate or make ourselves more palatable to Western tastemakers. I hope that my authenticity to my identity will open more doors for me than close them."

== Career ==
Yoo began her career as SunHee Seo, and in 2021 appeared in Moxie. She also performed ADR for Spider-Man: Far from Home, providing townsfolk screams and chatter for most of the film's scenes, alongside other voice actors. Adopting her stage name by 2021, she was cast in the A24/Apple TV+ drama film The Sky Is Everywhere, and alongside Nicole Kidman in the Amazon Prime series Expats.

In 2022, she was cast in Freaky Tales. Yoo won Best Performance in a U.S. Narrative Feature at the 2023 Tribeca Festival for her performance in Smoking Tigers. In 2024, she was nominated for Gotham Awards 'Outstanding Performance in a Limited Series' for Expats, which premiered in January.

In June, she was announced as a cast member in Until Dawn, a horror film taking place in the same universe as the 2015 video game published by PlayStation Studios. The film premiered in April 2025, receiving mixed reviews. It earned three stars out of five from The Guardian's Benjamin Lee, who praised the cast's performances and the film's technical strengths, while criticizing its lack of ambition and originality; as well as a B− grade from IndieWire's Alison Foreman, who considered the film a "betray[al]" of its source material yet entertaining and "inventive" in its own right. Various critics praised Yoo's character Megan, such as Elisabetta Bianchini of Yahoo News, Meagan Navarro of Bloody Disgusting, and Harry Stainer of Empire, despite giving the film negative or mixed reviews.

Bianchini described Megan as the most interesting character in the main cast, adding that "you feel her emotional journey more so than you do for even the lead character, Clover." Navarro wrote that in the main cast, "the only one who comes close to a distinct personality is Ji-young Yoo's Megan". Likewise, Stainer commended Yoo in his review of the film, writing, "Ji-young Yoo stands out as Megan, the group's psychic, and appears to be having more fun than anyone else on screen."

Yoo was the speaking voice of Zoey in animated musical film Kpop Demon Hunters, which began streaming on Netflix on June 20, 2025. The film became Netflix's most watched animated movie of all time a month later, and eventually Netflix's most-watched film ever at 236 million views by August, surpassing Red Notice (2021).

She will next star as Lizzy Lee, a young Korean-American woman auditioning to become a part of a K-pop girl group, in K-Pop: The Debut, which is scheduled to premiere in February 2027.

== Filmography ==
=== Film ===
Year	Title	Role	Notes/Ref.
2021	Moxie	Casey	As SunHee Seo
2022	The Sky Is Everywhere	Sarah	
2023	Smoking Tigers	Hayoung	
2024	Freaky Tales	Tina	
2025	Until Dawn	Megan	
2025	KPop Demon Hunters	Zoey	Speaking Voice
2027	K-Pop: The Debut †	Lizzy Lee	Post-production

=== Television ===
Year	Title	Role	Notes/Ref.
2020	Sweet Home	Lee Eun Yoo (voice)	Recurring role, 10 episodes
2022	We Baby Bears	Sheep Heads / Student 2 / Student 3 (voice)	1 episode, as SunHee Seo
2024	Expats	Mercy	Miniseries, 6 episodes
TBA	Presumed Innocent	TBA	Recurring role (season 2)

== Accolades ==
=== Awards and nominations ===
Award	Year	Category	Work	Result	Ref.
Tribeca Festival	2023	Best Performance in a U.S. Narrative Feature	Smoking Tigers	Won	
Gotham Awards	2024	Outstanding Performance in a Limited Series	Expats	Nominated	
Nickelodeon Kids' Choice Awards	2026	Favorite On-Screen Duo/Trio (Note: with Arden Cho, May Hong)	KPop Demon Hunters	Nominated	
North Carolina Film Critics Association	2026	Best Voice Performance In Animation or Mixed Media	KPop Demon Hunters	Nominated	

=== Listicles ===
Name of publisher, year listed, name of listicle, and placement
Publisher	Year	Listicle	Placement	Ref.
Forbes	2025	100 Most Powerful Women (Note: with The female creators and cast of the Netflix animated film KPop Demon Hunters)	100th	
Gold House	2024	A100 List (Note: with Lulu Wang, Sarayu Blue)	Included	
Gold House	2026	Gold100 List (Note: with Maggie Kang, Michelle Wong, Arden Cho, May Hong, Ejae, Audrey Nuna & Rei Ami)	Included	
The Hollywood Reporter	2026	Animation Power List	Included	
