= Story of a Girl (film) =

2017 television film by Kyra Sedgwick

- Film poster
- Genre: Drama
- Based on: Story of a Girl by Sara Zarr
- Written by: Laurie Collyer; Emily Bickford Lansbury
- Directed by: Kyra Sedgwick
- Starring: Ryann Shane; Jon Tenney; Sosie Bacon; Iain Belcher; Tyler Johnston; Caroline Cave; Andrew Herr; Kevin Bacon
- Music by: Travis Bacon
- Country of origin: United States
- Original language: English

Production
- Executive producer: Ross Katz
- Producers: Kyra Sedgwick; Emily Bickford Lansbury; Elizabeth Levine; Adrian Salpeter
- Cinematography: Alar Kivilo
- Editor: Sabine Hoffman
- Running time: 90 minutes
- Production company: Random Bench Productions

Original release
- Network: Lifetime
- Release: July 23, 2017

Story of a Girl is a 2017 American drama television film directed by Kyra Sedgwick and written by Laurie Collyer and Emily Bickford Lansbury, based on the 2007 novel of the same name by Sara Zarr. The film stars Kevin Bacon, Jon Tenney, Ryann Shane, Sosie Bacon and Tyler Johnston. It aired on July 23, 2017, in the United States on the Lifetime network.

== Cast ==
- Ryann Shane as Deanna Lambert
- Jon Tenney as Ray Lambert, Deanna's father
- Kevin Bacon as Michael
- Sosie Bacon as Stacey
- Iain Belcher as Darren Lambert, Deanna's younger brother
- Tyler Johnston as Tommy Webber
- Caroline Cave as Debbie Lambert, Deanna's mother
- Andrew Herr as Jason
- Michael Maize as Mr. North
- Sarah Grey as Caitlin Spinelli

== Production ==
Producers Kyra Sedgwick and Emily Bickford Lansbury optioned the film. Laurie Collyer wrote the first draft of the screenplay and Lansbury wrote the final version.

== Reception ==
The film received positive reviews from critics, which was praised for Sedgwick's directing.
