= Charliebird =

2025 film by Libby Ewing

- Directed by: Libby Ewing
- Screenplay by: Samantha Smart
- Produced by: Elliot Gipson, Samantha Smart, and Libby Ewing
- Starring: Samantha Smart and Gabriela Ochoa Perez
- Cinematography: Luca Del Puppo
- Edited by: Perry Blackshear and Libby Ewing
- Distributed by: Freestyle Digital Media
- Release date: 2025
- Country: United States

Charliebird is a 2025 American film directed by Libby Ewing and written by Samantha Smart.

Charliebird premiered at the 2025 Tribeca Festival where it was awarded the Founders Award for Best U.S. Narrative Feature. Also, Gabriela Ochoa Perez picked up the award for Best Performance in a U.S. Narrative Feature.

After screenings on the festival circuit, the film's theatrical release was in February 2026. It debuted on pay-for-view, streaming services, and digital format on March 31, 2026.

Critics have noted that the strength of the film is the chemistry between its two lead actresses, Samantha Smart and Gabriela Ochoa Perez.

The inspiration for 'Charliebird' was Samantha Smart's memories of her childhood in Texas, and grief over the loss of people in her own life.

The film was shot in Houston, Texas.

== Plot ==
A music therapist named Al (Alyse) befriends a teenager (Charlie) hospitalized with kidney illness in the Houston area. Al is haunted by a painful childhood memory that took place in a field full of high voltage power lines.

== Cast ==
- Samantha Smart as Al (Alyse)
- Gabriela Ochoa Perez as Charlie
- Gabe Fazio as Jack, Charlie's father
- Maria Peyramaure as Elena, Charlie's mother
- Larry Ewing as the doctor
- Tish Brandt as Tish the hospital administrator
- Kate Sanchez as young Al
