= Heart Valley =

Short documentary film

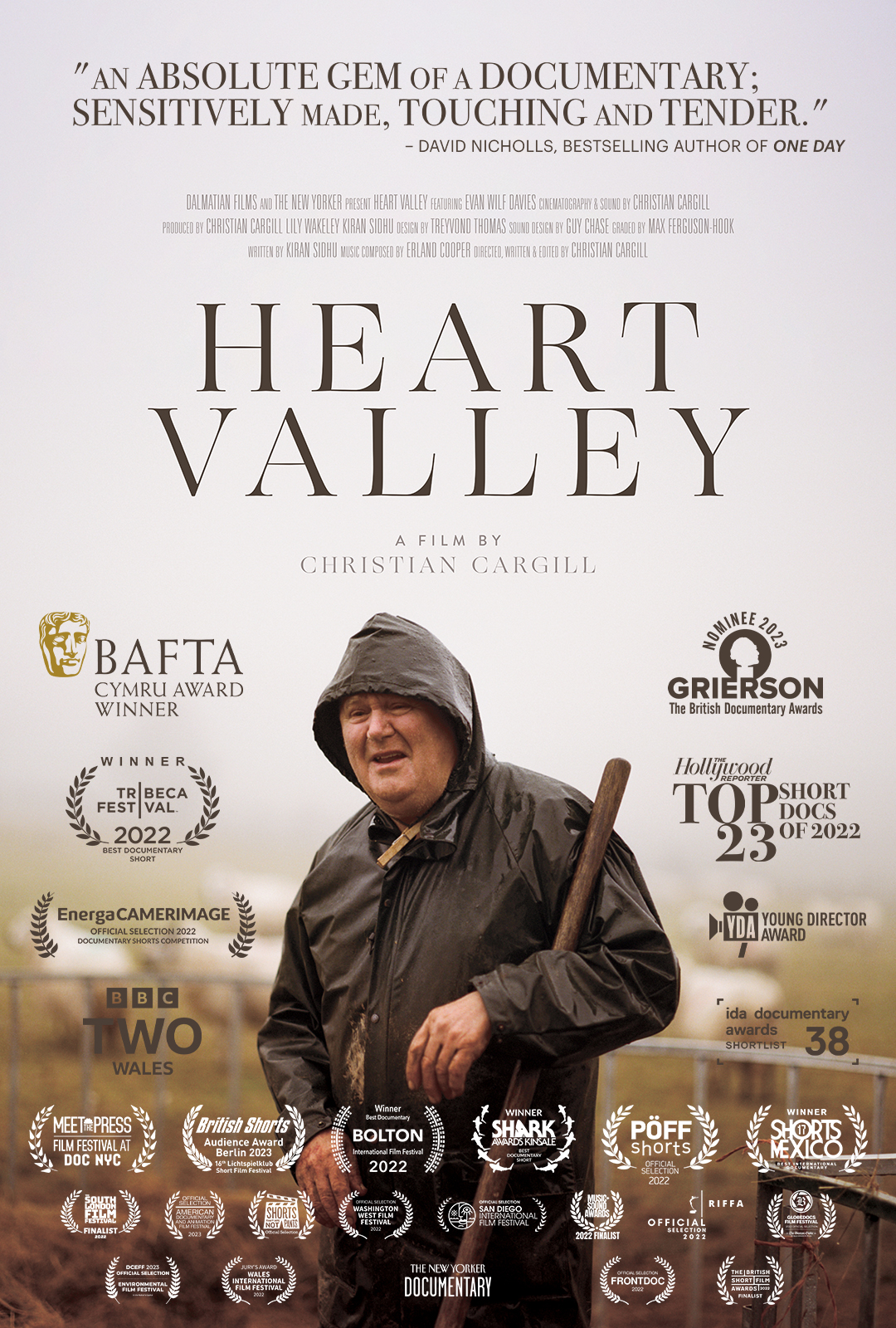
- Official Poster for Heart Valley
- Directed by: Christian Cargill
- Written by: Christian Cargill; Kiran Sidhu
- Produced by: Christian Cargill; Lily Wakeley; Kiran Sidhu
- Starring: Evan Wilf Davies
- Cinematography: Christian Cargill
- Edited by: Christian Cargill
- Music by: Erland Cooper
- Production company: Dalmatian Films
- Distributed by: The New Yorker
- Release dates: June 2022 (Tribeca); July 2022 (Wales, UK)
- Running time: 19 minutes
- Countries: Wales, United Kingdom
- Languages: English, Welsh

Heart Valley is a 2022 short documentary film about Welsh shepherd Wilf Davies. Directed and produced by filmmaker Christian Cargill, the film had its world premiere at the Tribeca Film Festival on June 9, 2022 where it won the award for Best Documentary Short. It first broadcast in the UK on BBC Two Wales and BBC iPlayer on July 26, 2022 and released online with The New Yorker on December 2, 2022. The documentary won the BAFTA Cymru Award 2023 for Short Film and was nominated for The Grierson Award 2023 for Best Documentary Short. The Hollywood Reporter named Heart Valley as one of their Top 23 Short Documentaries of 2022 and it was one of 98 films to qualify for the 95th Academy Awards for Best Documentary Short.

== Synopsis ==
Heart Valley follows a day in the life of Evan Wilf Davies, a shepherd from Ceredigion in West Wales. The film looks at the world through Wilf's eyes, asking questions about what it is we should value as a society. The documentary was composed by Scottish multi-instrumentalist Erland Cooper and was originally inspired by an article written by Kiran Sidhu in The Guardian newspaper.

== Reception ==
The film won the BAFTA Cymru Award for Best Short Film and multiple more awards including Best Documentary Short at Tribeca Film Festival. The jury, which included Amy Ryan, Shane Smith and A.J. Jacobs, described, "This quiet short sneaks in profound lessons about the importance of simplicity, doing the work we love, and what the meaning of life is." Director Christian Cargill was also nominated for a BAFTA Cymru Award and at Camerimage Film Festival for his cinematography on the film. The documentary received a variety of positive press, featuring on BBC World's Talking Movies with Tom Brook, The Guardian, BBC News, BBC Radio Wales, The i and S4C's Prynhawn Da programme. The author David Nicholls described the film as "an absolute gem of a documentary; sensitively made, touching and tender."

== Awards & Festivals ==
Year	Festival/Awards Ceremony	Award/Category	Status
2022	Tribeca Film Festival	Best Documentary Short	Winner
2023	BAFTA Cymru Award	Short Film	Winner
2023	The Grierson Award	Best Documentary Short	Nominated
2023	BAFTA Cymru Award	Factual Photography	Nominated
2023	Young Director Award	Best Documentary (Silver Screen Award)	Winner
2023	British Shorts Berlin	Audience Award	Winner
2022	Bolton Film Festival	Best Documentary	Winner
2023	Kinsale Shark Award	Best Documentary Short	Winner
2022	Shorts México	Best International Documentary	Winner
2022	Wales International Film Festival	Jury's Award for Best Short Documentary	Winner
2022	Camerimage	Best Short Documentary (Cinematography)	Nominated
2022	PÖFF Shorts	Best Live Action Short Film	Nominated
2022	Regina International Film Festival & Awards (RIFFA)	Best International Documentary Short	Nominated
2022	IDA Documentary Award	Best Short Documentary	Shortlisted
2022	The British Short Film Awards	Best Documentary Short	Finalist
2022	The Music+Sound Awards	Best Sync In a Film	Finalist
2022	The South London Film Festival	Best Short Documentary	Finalist
