= Smoking Tigers =

- Directed by: So Young Shelly Yo
- Written by: So Young Shelly Yo
- Starring: Ji-young Yoo; Jung Joon-ho
- Release date: June 10, 2023 (Tribeca)
- Running time: 85 minutes
- Country: United States
- Languages: English; Korean

Smoking Tigers is a 2023 American drama film written and directed by So Young Shelly Yo and starring Ji-young Yoo and Jung Joon-ho.

== Plot ==
A lonely 16-year old Korean American Hayoung tries to hide her problematic family and lower income background from her new wealthy friends.

== Cast ==
- Ji-young Yoo as Hayoung
- Jung Joon-ho as Appa
- Abin Andrews as Umma
- Erin Choi as Ara
- Erin Yoo as Rose
- Phinehas Yoon as Joon Park

== Release ==
The film premiered at the Tribeca Festival on June 10, 2023.

== Reception ==
The film has a 100% rating on Rotten Tomatoes based on seven reviews.

Jesse Hassenger of Paste gave the film a positive review and wrote, "In its clear-eyed and naturalistic way, Smoking Tigers takes on a surprising fullness."
