= Laurie Collyer =

American film director and screenwriter

Laurie Collyer (born 1967) is an American film director and screenwriter.

== Career ==
Born in Summit, New Jersey, she grew up in Mountainside, New Jersey and attended Oberlin College. She went to film school at New York University. She wrote and directed Sherrybaby, for which actress Maggie Gyllenhaal received a Golden Globe nomination. She also directed the film Nuyorican Dream in 1999. She is in development to direct a film based on the story of Julia Butterfly Hill and the redwood tree Luna, which is to star Rachel Weisz. She has also written the screenplay of an upcoming adaptation of Sara Zarr's novel Story of a Girl.

In 2013, she directed Sunlight Jr., starring Naomi Watts and Matt Dillon. In 2015, she directed The Secret Life of Marilyn Monroe, which stars Kelli Garner, Susan Sarandon, Emily Watson, Jeffrey Dean Morgan, and Eva Amurri Martino. In 2018, she directed a comedy-drama Furlough, starring Tessa Thompson, Melissa Leo, and Whoopi Goldberg.
