= Cotton Fever =

- Directed by: Daniel Blake Schwartz
- Written by: Daniel Blake Schwartz
- Produced by: Phil Keefe; Eveline Levin; Daniel Brandt; Cole Eckerle; Dane Eckerle; Daniel Blake Schwartz
- Starring: Kyle Gallner; Sosie Bacon; Chabely Ponce; Ronald Emile; Ari Mora; Colton Osorio; Sam Quartin; Melvin Douglas
- Cinematography: Tom Acton Fitzgerald
- Edited by: Adam Dicterow
- Music by: Michael Sempert
- Production companies: AC3 Media; Bad Grey; Muskoka Movies
- Release date: June 5, 2026 (Tribeca Festival)
- Running time: 89 minutes
- Country: United States
- Language: English

Cotton Fever is a 2026 American drama thriller film written and directed by Daniel Blake Schwartz in his feature directorial debut, based on his real-life experiences. It follows a group of interconnected people who struggle to overcome the cycles of addiction and recovery in Chelsea, Massachusetts. It stars Kyle Gallner, Sosie Bacon, Chabely Ponce, Ronald Emile, Ari Mora, Colton Osorio, Sam Quartin, and Melvin Douglas.

The film premiered at the Tribeca Festival in competition on June 5, 2026.

== Cast ==
- Kyle Gallner as James
- Sosie Bacon as Dina
- Chabely Ponce as Sam
- Ronald Emile as Akil
- Ari Mora as Manny
- Colton Osorio as Harley
- Sam Quartin as Kim
- Melvin Douglas as Sean

== Production ==
Principal photography begun in September 2024 in Boston, on a drama thriller film titled Cotton Fever by filmmaker Daniel Blake Schwartz in his feature directorial debut, starring Kyle Gallner, Sosie Bacon, Chabely Ponce, Ronald Emile, Ari Mora, Colton Osorio, Sam Quartin, and Melvin Douglas. The film is based on Schwartz's real-life experiences. Schwartz directed a short film with the same title in 2022. Filming also took place in Chelsea, Massachusetts and wrapped in October 2024.

== Release ==
Cotton Fever premiered at the Tribeca Festival in competition on June 5, 2026.

== Accolades ==
Award / Film Festival	Date of ceremony	Category	Recipient(s)	Result	Ref.
Tribeca Festival	June 14, 2026	Best Narrative Feature	Daniel Blake Schwartz	Won	
Tribeca Festival	June 14, 2026	Best Cinematography	Tom Acton Fitzgerald	Won	
