= Sosie Bacon =

American actress (born 1992)

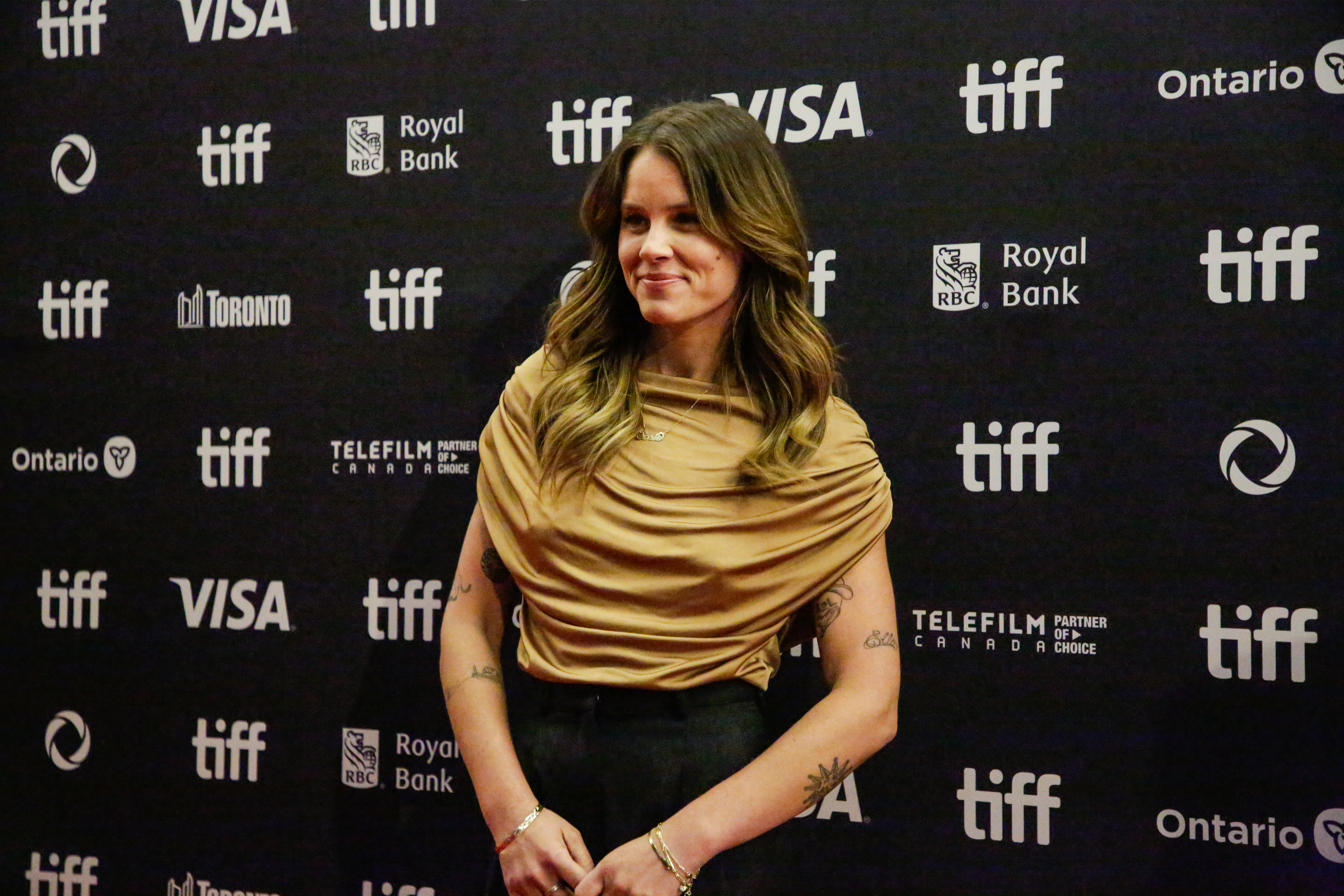
- Bacon at the 2024 Toronto International Film Festival
- Born: Sosie Ruth Bacon; March 15, 1992 (age 34); Los Angeles, California, U.S.
- Education: Brown University
- Occupation: Actress
- Years active: 2005–present
- Parents: Kevin Bacon; Kyra Sedgwick
- Relatives: Edmund Bacon (grandfather); Michael Bacon (uncle); Sedgwick family; Robert Sedgwick (uncle); Mike Stern (half-uncle)

Sosie Ruth Bacon (born March 15, 1992) is an American actress. The daughter of actors Kevin Bacon and Kyra Sedgwick, her first role was playing 10-year-old Emily in the film Loverboy (2005). While her parents did not push for her to continue acting, she was encouraged by producer James Duff to appear in The Closer (2009).

As an adult, Bacon appeared in the films Wishin' and Hopin' (2014), Ana Maria in Novela Land (2015), Charlie Says (2018), The Last Summer (2019), Wyrm (2019) and Smile (2022), and the television series Scream (2016), Story of a Girl (2017), 13 Reasons Why (2017–2018), Narcos: Mexico (2020), Mare of Easttown (2021), and As We See It (2022).

== Early life ==
Sosie Bacon was born in 1992 to actors Kevin Bacon and Kyra Sedgwick, who tried to provide her with as ordinary an upbringing as was possible in the circumstances and did not want to push her into acting. Bacon studied at Brown University and has studied at musical theatre company CAP21.

== Career ==
In 2005, she starred in Loverboy. While directing Loverboy, Kevin Bacon decided to cast Sosie in the film. Asked about the choice, he said that he made the decision as a director, not as a father, because he believed his daughter was perfect for the role, and "Sosie was cool. She kind of got it out of her system. She said 'Oh, that was fun—now I'm going back to school'." Sosie portrayed the main character Emily in a flashback, while the adult Emily was portrayed by Sosie's mother Kyra Sedgwick. As Emily, Sosie sang an a cappella version of the David Bowie song "Life on Mars?", that was described in a review from The New York Times as "grotesquely funny". Her brother, Travis Bacon, was cast in a smaller role in the film. Kevin praised Sosie's work on Loverboy, but said that he would not be encouraging her to pursue acting further.

In 2009, she starred in The Closer. She joined the cast of Fiction in Photographs in 2012, an off-Broadway musical by Dan Mills and Randy Redd.

On November 21, 2013, Bacon was crowned Miss Golden Globe 2014. Chosen each year by the Hollywood Foreign Press Association, Miss Golden Globe assists with the Globes ceremony and is typically the daughter of Hollywood celebrities.

In 2014, Bacon was cast in the leading female role of the independent film Off Season, opposite Chance Kelly, which was released in 2017. Following up her role in 13 Reasons Why, Bacon was cast in Here and Now, a 2018-debuting HBO family drama series from award-winning writer-producer Alan Ball, as Kristen, the youngest daughter of a couple played by Tim Robbins and Holly Hunter. She appeared in HBO's 2021 limited series Mare of Easttown, as Carrie Layden. She starred in the 2022 horror film Smile as Dr. Rose Cotter, and received praise for her performance.

== Personal life ==
As of 2025, she was in a relationship with actor Scoot McNairy.

== Filmography ==
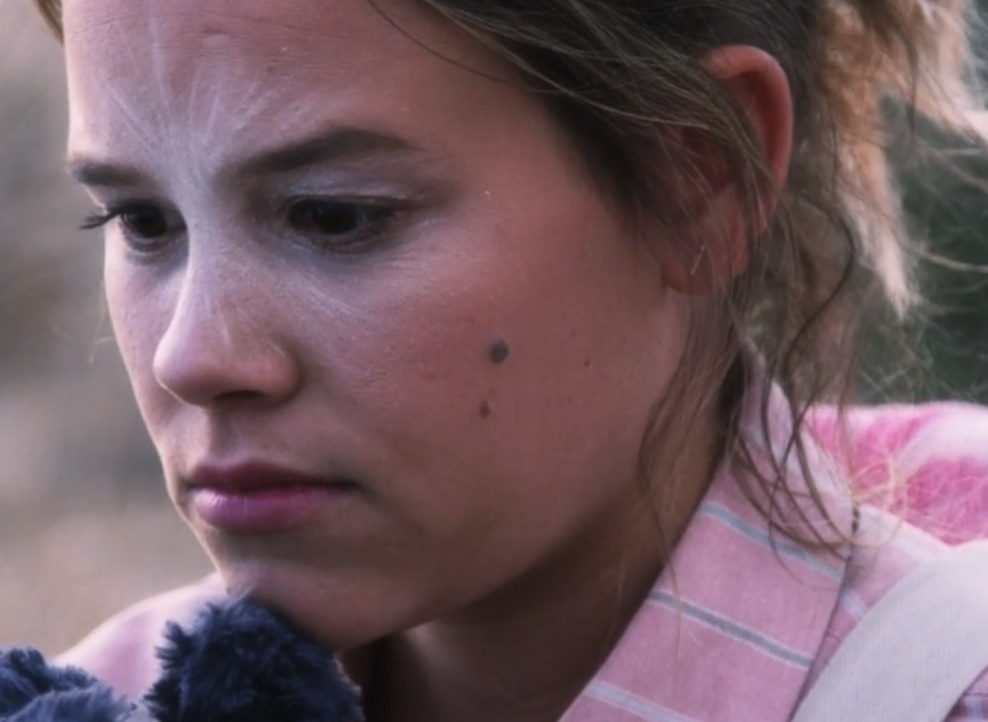
Bacon in the trailer for Lady Lonely (2014)

=== Film ===
Year	Title	Role	Notes
2005	Loverboy	Emily Stoll (aged 10)	
2014	Wishin' and Hopin'	Frances Funicello	
2014	Another Life	Maggie	Short film
2014	Lady Lonely	Lady	Short film
2015	Ana Maria in Novela Land	Poppy Lake	
2015	Lost Boy	Summer Harris	TV film
2015	Sky is Falling	Frankie	Short film
2015	Stay	Charlotte	TV film
2016	Chronically Metropolitan	Hannah	
2016	The Visitor	Woman	Short film
2016	We	Sam	Short film
2017	Lyra	Miriam Keating	Short film
2017	Story of a Girl	Stacey	TV film
2017	Off Season	Cassie	
2017	This Remains	—N/a	Short film
2018	Charlie Says	Patricia Krenwinkel	
2019	The Last Summer	Audrey Jarvis	
2019	Wyrm	Lindsay	
2021	Traces	Sierra Jones	
2022	Smile	Dr. Rose Cotter	
2024	Once More, Like Rain Man	Mean Casting Assistant	Short film
2024	What We Got Wrong	Ella	Also director
2024	Other Other	Myka	Short film
2024	Keep Coming Back	Butterfly	Short film
2024	Smile 2	Dr. Rose Cotter	Uncredited; likeness only
2025	Hazard	Sara	Also producer
2026	Cold Storage	Dr. Hero Martins	
2026	Family Movie	TBA	Also producer
2026	Cotton Fever	Dina	Post-production

=== Television ===
Year	Title	Role	Notes
2009	The Closer	Charlie Johnson	4 episodes
2014	Basic Witches	Sosie	
2015–16	Scream	Rachel Murray	Recurring role (seasons 1 and 2)
2016	Sister Judy and the Deliquents	Carol	TV short
2016	Aquarius	Anna	2 episodes
2016–17	On Hiatus with Monty Geer	Rosie Siri (voice)	2 episodes Episode: "F*cking iPhone"
2017–18	13 Reasons Why	Skye Miller	Recurring role (seasons 1 and 2)
2018	Here and Now	Kristen Bayer-Boatwright	Main role
2020	Narcos: Mexico	Mimi Webb Miller	4 episodes
2021	Mare of Easttown	Carrie Layden	Miniseries
2022	As We See It	Mandy	Main role
2026	Scarpetta	Abby Turnball	
