= Something to Talk About (film) =

- Theatrical release poster
- Directed by: Lasse Hallström
- Written by: Callie Khouri
- Produced by: Goldie Hawn; Anthea Sylbert; Paula Weinstein
- Starring: Dennis Quaid; Julia Roberts; Robert Duvall; Gena Rowlands; Kyra Sedgwick
- Cinematography: Sven Nykvist
- Edited by: Mia Goldman
- Music by: Hans Zimmer; Graham Preskett
- Distributed by: Warner Bros. Pictures
- Release date: August 4, 1995
- Running time: 105 minutes
- Country: United States
- Language: English
- Budget: $30 million
- Box office: $77.3 million (worldwide)

Something to Talk About is a 1995 American comedy drama film directed by Lasse Hallström, from a screenplay written by Callie Khouri. It stars Julia Roberts and Dennis Quaid as an estranged couple, Kyra Sedgwick as Roberts' sister, and Robert Duvall and Gena Rowlands as their parents.

The film's title refers to Bonnie Raitt song of the same name. It was shot in various locations around Savannah, Georgia and Beaufort, South Carolina.

== Plot ==
Grace King Bichon is happily married to her husband Eddie Bichon and together they have one daughter Caroline. She works for her father Wyly King, a show jumping trainer who owns and operates a lesson barn, and tries to convince him to use her friend Hank's horse Possum in an upcoming competition. Wyly stubbornly says no, so Hank threatens to quit. However, Grace convinces him that she will persuade her father to use Silver Bell somehow.

While driving home from a meeting, Grace sees Eddie (who also works for his father) outside the bank with a blonde woman, whom he kisses. This shocks Grace, who realizes he has been cheating on her.

When Eddie lies to her on their answering machine that he is going out to dinner with his father and some of their clients, Grace goes with Caroline to the restaurant and catches him with the blonde. Eddie denies the kiss when confronted, but Grace does not believe him, and takes Caroline to stay at her sister Emma Rae's house while trying to figure out what to do.

Grace asks Wyly for support, but his sole focus is on the upcoming show jumping competition. However, he has changed his mind about Silver Bell and allows Caroline to compete with him.

Grace, upset that her father will not support her, does some research and discovers that he cheated on her mother Georgia with multiple women. This causes more chaos as Georgia kicks Wyly out of the house and reveals to him that Dr. Frank Lewis has recently told her she has beautiful hips.

After Grace almost nearly cheats on Eddie with a friend named Jamie — the horse trainer who has brought Wylie his new champion — she lightly poisons her husband using her grandmother's recipe. Angry, Eddie secretly consults a divorce attorney, then they decide to meet at their house to discuss what happened between them. There, he tells Grace that the reason why he cheated on her is because he and Grace were no longer being intimate with each other.

Grace reveals the reason she stopped having sex with him. It is because she had become depressed contemplating her life. After becoming pregnant with Caroline, Grace dropped out of veterinarian college, then went to work for her father which she had not wanted. They both realize they still do love each other so they decide to try to work through their problems.

On the day of the competition, Caroline wins with Silver Bell. Wyly competes too, but loses. Georgia comes to him and tells him she is proud of him no matter what, and they reconcile.

At Caroline's victory celebration Eddie and Grace dance with each other happily. Grace reveals to her father that she is going back to college to finish her veterinarian degree, but will also continue working for his stable, and they dance together as well.

The end of the film shows that Grace has been attending veterinary school and has fully reconciled with Eddie.

== Cast ==
- Julia Roberts as Grace King Bichon: Eddie's wife, Caroline's mom. She's very upset and devastated when she discovers her husband's infidelity.
- Dennis Quaid as Eddie Bichon: Grace's husband, Caroline's dad, who cheats on Grace.
- Robert Duvall as Wyly King - Grace and Emma Rae's dad who owns and operates a show jumping stable.
- Gena Rowlands as Georgia King: Grace and Emma Rae's mom
- Kyra Sedgwick as Emma Rae King: Wyly and Georgia's daughter, Grace's sister. When she finds her brother-in-law Eddie is cheating on her sister Grace she kicks him in the balls to teach him a lesson.
- Brett Cullen as Jamie Johnson
- Haley Aull as Caroline "Doodlebug" Bichon: Eddie and Grace's daughter
- Anne Shropshire as Aunt Rae
- Muse Watson as Hank Corrigan

== Reception ==
The film generally received mixed reviews. Rotten Tomatoes reports that 33% of critics, based on a sample of 33 critics, gave a positive review. The average rating from these critics is 5.3/10. The site's consensus states: "Small-town gossip and a battle of the sexes should really add up to more than Something to Talk About, especially with this much talent before the camera." On Metacritic, the film has a score of 62 out of 100, based on 28 critics, indicating "generally favorable reviews". Audiences polled by CinemaScore gave the film an average grade of "A-" on an A+ to F scale.

Kyra Sedgwick was nominated for a Golden Globe Award for Best Actress in a Supporting Role.

== See also ==
- List of films about horses
