= Tribeca Festival =

Annual film festival in New York City

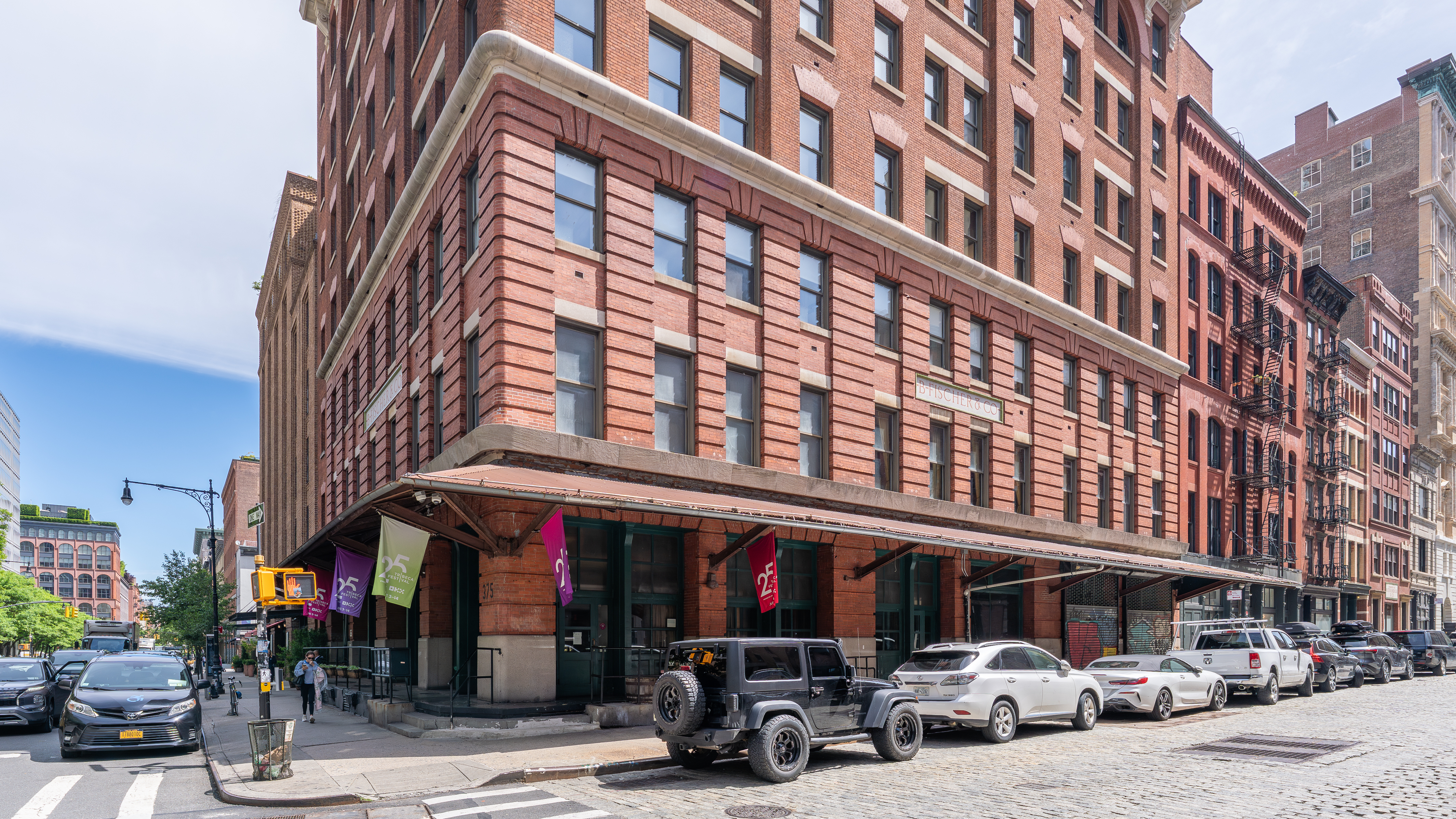
- Headquarters at 375 Greenwich Street
- Location: New York City, U.S.
- Founded: 2002; 24 years ago
- Most recent: 2026
- Festival date: Opening: June 3, 2026; Closing: June 14, 2026
- Language: English
- Website: tribecafilm.com

Current: 25th
- 26th 24th

The Tribeca Festival is an annual film festival organized by Tribeca Enterprises. It takes place each spring in New York City, primarily in the Tribeca West and East Historic Districts, showcasing a diverse selection of film, episodic, talks, music, games, art, and immersive programming. The festival was founded by Robert De Niro, Jane Rosenthal, and Craig Hatkoff in 2002 to spur the economic and cultural revitalization of Lower Manhattan following the September 11, 2001, attacks on the World Trade Center. Until 2020, the festival was known as the Tribeca Film Festival.

The festival hosts over 600 screenings with approximately 150,000 attendees each year, and awards independent artists in 23 juried competitive categories.

== History ==
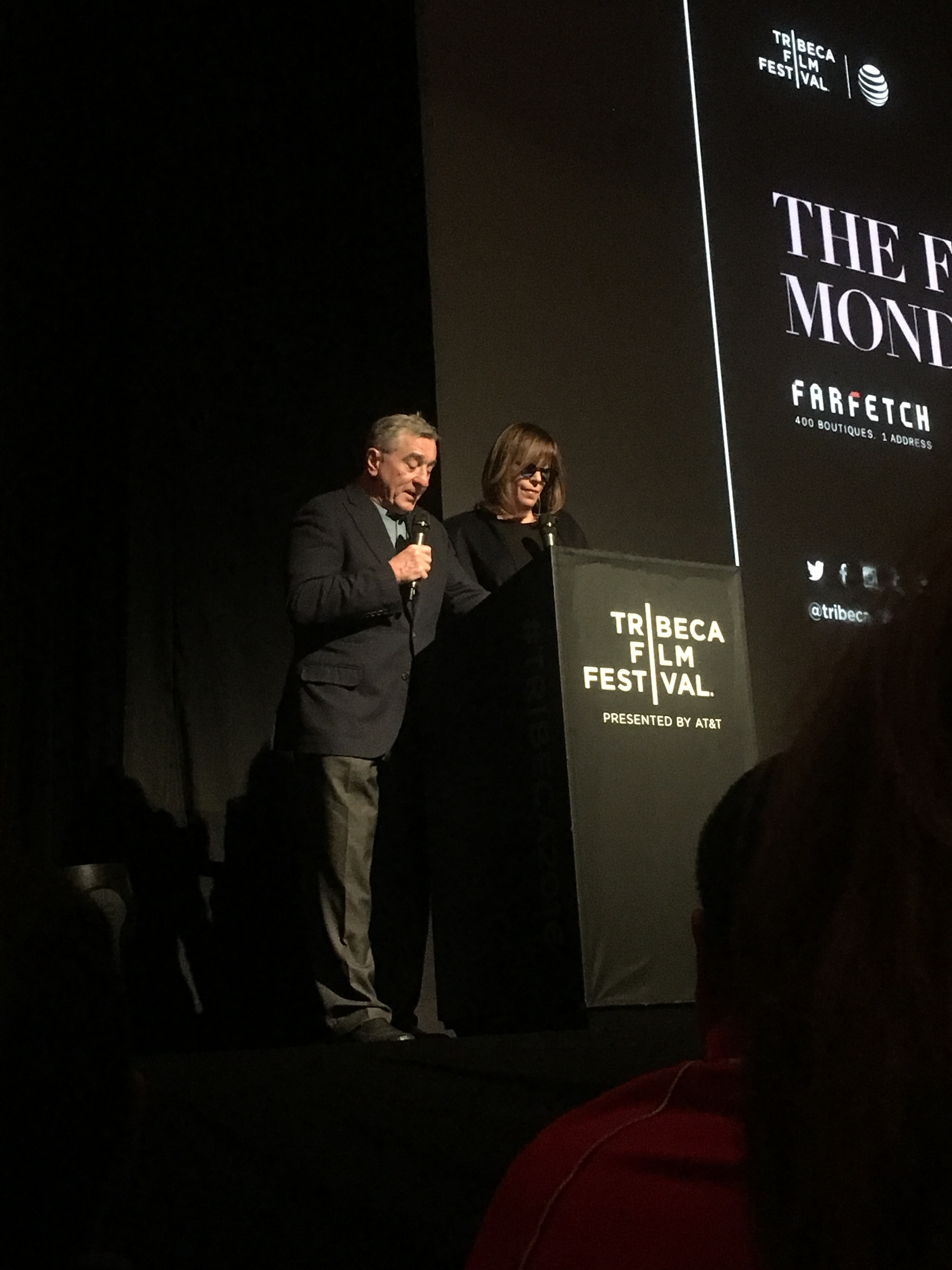
Festival founders Jane Rosenthal and Robert De Niro

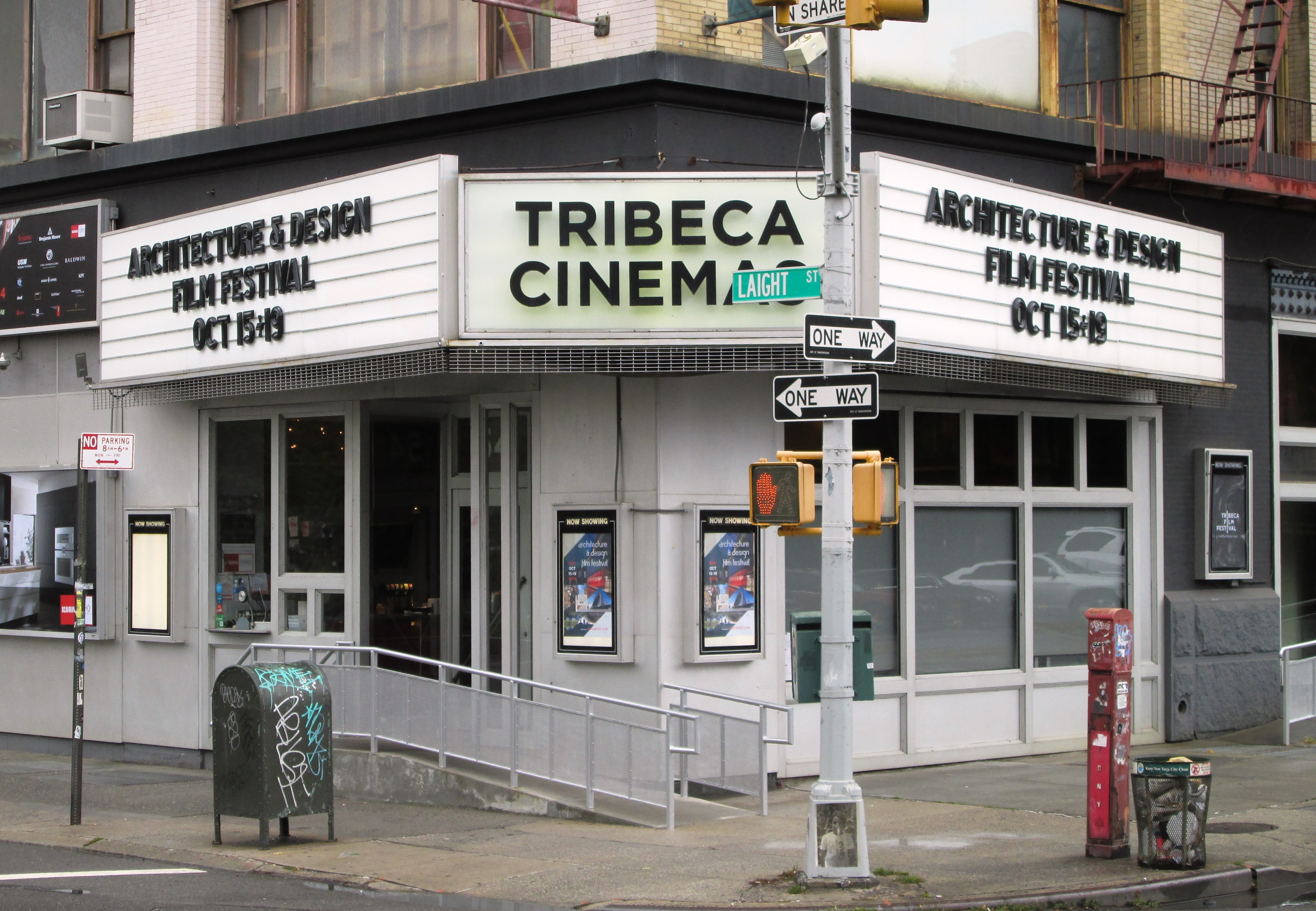
The marquee of Tribeca Cinemas

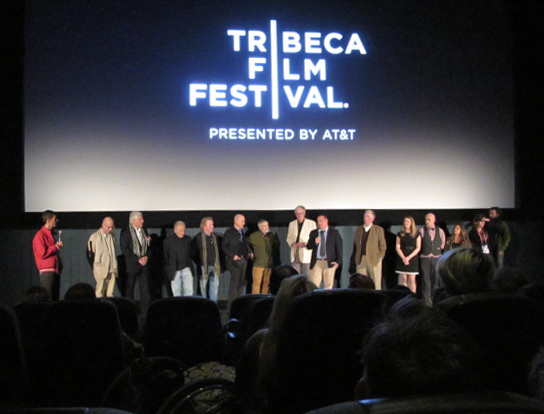
After the premiere of a documentary film at the 2015 Tribeca Film Festival, subjects and creators onstage

Logo until 2021

=== Launch: 2002–2006 ===
The Tribeca Film Festival was founded in 2002 by Jane Rosenthal, Robert De Niro, and Craig Hatkoff, in response to the September 11 attacks on the World Trade Center and the consequent loss of vitality in the Tribeca neighborhood in Lower Manhattan. The inaugural festival launched after 120 days of planning with the help of more than 1,300 volunteers. It opened May 8, 2002 with About A Boy. The first festival was attended by more than 150,000 people and featured several up-and-coming filmmakers. The festival included juried narrative, documentary and short film competitions; a restored classics series; a best of New York series curated by Martin Scorsese; 13 major panel discussions; an all-day family festival; and the premieres of independent and studio films Star Wars: Episode II – Attack of the Clones - made independently, the American remake of Insomnia, Divine Secrets of the Ya-Ya Sisterhood, and The League of Extraordinary Gentlemen.

The 2003 festival brought more than 300,000 people. The festival showcased an expanded group of independent features, documentaries and short films from around the world, coupled with studio premieres, panel discussions, music and comedy concerts, a family festival, sports activities, and outdoor movie screenings along the Hudson River. The family festival featured children's movie screenings, storytelling, family panels, workshops, and interactive games culminating in a daylong street fair that drew a crowd estimated at 250,000 people.

At the end of 2003, De Niro purchased the theater at 54 Varick Street which had housed the recently closed Screening Room, an art house that had shown independent films nightly, renaming it the Tribeca Cinema. It became one of the venues of the festival.

=== Expansion and new media: 2006–2016 ===
After the departure of Peter Scarlet, who had served as the festival's first executive director from October 2002 to 2007, and in an effort to serve its mission of bringing independent film to the widest possible audience, in 2006, the festival expanded its reach in New York City and internationally. In New York City, Tribeca hosted screenings throughout Manhattan as the festival's 1,000-plus screening schedule outgrew the capacity downtown. Internationally, the Festival brought films to the Rome Film Festival. As part of the celebrations in Rome, Tribeca was awarded the first-ever "Steps and Stars" award, presented on the Spanish Steps. A total of 169 feature films and 99 shorts were selected from 4,100 film submissions, including 1,950 feature submissions, three times the total submissions from the first festival in 2002. The festival featured 90 world premieres, nine international premieres, 31 North American premieres, 6 U.S. premieres, and 28 New York City premieres.

In 2009, Rosenthal, Hatkoff, and De Niro were named number 14 on Barron's list of the world's top 25 philanthropists for their role in regenerating TriBeCa's economy after September 11.

In 2011, L.A. Noire became the first video game to be recognized by the Tribeca Film Festival. In 2013, Beyond: Two Souls, featuring Elliot Page and Willem Dafoe, became only the second game to be premiered at the festival.

From 2015, Spring Studios, located a few doors down from the Tribeca Cinema at 50 Varick Street, became the festival's main venue.

In 2016, the festival announced the introduction of separate narrative award categories for U.S. and International films in order to "deepen [their] support of American narrative filmmakers."

=== COVID-19 pandemic response: 2020 ===
The 19th Tribeca Film Festival, originally scheduled for April 15–26, 2020, was cancelled due to the COVID-19 pandemic. In the weeks and months that followed, Tribeca launched several digital offerings to highlight filmmakers and creators who had hoped to premiere their latest works at the spring gathering. It provided a secure digital platform for 2020 Festival films seeking distribution to be viewed by press and industry and hosted a virtual gathering space for Tribeca N.O.W. Creators Market.

In response to the global pandemic, Tribeca organized We Are One in partnership with YouTube, a free 10-day digital festival that provided entertainment and connection for audiences at home and raised international COVID-19 relief funds. The program was co-curated by 21 of the top international film festivals including Cannes, Sundance, TIFF and Venice and showcased over 100 hours of shorts, features, talks and music to an audience of 1.9 million people in 179 countries.

In July 2020, Tribeca launched one of the first large-scale pop-up drive-in series across the country to provide audiences with entertainment in a safe, socially-distanced environment. Screenings took place at the Rose Bowl in Pasadena, CA, Dallas Cowboys AT&T Stadium in Arlington, Texas, Orchard Beach in the Bronx neighborhood of New York and Nickerson Beach in Nassau County, New York. The series employed local production staff and partnered with small food businesses that had been impacted by the lockdown.

On August 7, 2020, organizers announced that the 20th anniversary edition of the festival was to be held from June 9 to June 20, 2021, with a dedicated space to celebrate films whose premieres were not able to take place in the festival that was cancelled in 2020. In a first for the festival, Tribeca also hosted community screenings — in both indoor and outdoor venues — in all five New York City boroughs.

=== 2020s ===
The festival added a dedicated video games category beginning with the 2021 event. Games nominated are presented in online presentations during the Festival, similar to film screenings. That year, the festival dropped "Film" from its name.

Since 2022, the festival has combined the US and International "Best Actor" and "Best Actress" categories into a US and International "Best Performance" categories.

The Tribeca Festival also presents the Artist Awards, an annual program that selects contemporary artists to offer works to winning creators at the Festival; it is currently sponsored by CHANEL. Its 2024 cohort was curated by Racquel Chevremont, who also curated the Tribeca Festival Artist Awards in 2022 and 2023.

2026 edition of the festival, the 25th anniversary, runs from June 3 to 14 and will showcase 118 feature films, including 103 world premieres, alongside 86 shorts.

== Awards ==
=== Global Awards ===
==== Best Narrative Feature ====
- 2002 – Roger Dodger, directed by Dylan Kidd
- 2003 – Blind Shaft, directed by Li Yang
- 2004 – Green Hat, directed by Liu Fendou
- 2005 – Stolen Life, directed by Li Shaohong
- 2006 – Iluminados por el fuego, directed by Tristán Bauer
- 2007 – My Father My Lord, directed by David Volach
- 2008 – Let the Right One In, directed by Tomas Alfredson
- 2009 – About Elly, directed by Asghar Farhadi
- 2010 – When We Leave, directed by Feo Aladag
- 2011 – She Monkeys, directed by Lisa Aschan
- 2012 – War Witch, directed by Kim Nguyen
- 2013 – The Rocket, directed by Kim Mordaunt
- 2014 – Zero Motivation, directed by Talya Lavie
- 2015 – Virgin Mountain, directed by Dagur Kári

==== Best Actor in a Narrative Feature Film ====
- 2003 – Igor Bareš in Výlet and Ohad Knoller in Yossi & Jagger
- 2004 – Ian Hart in Blind Flight
- 2005 – Cees Geel in Simon
- 2006 – Jürgen Vogel in Der Freie Wille
- 2007 – Lofti Ebdelli in Making Of. (Akher film)
- 2008 – Thomas Turgoose and Piotr Jagiello in Somers Town
- 2009 – Ciarán Hinds in The Eclipse
- 2010 – Eric Elmosnino in Gainsbourg (Vie héroïque)
- 2011 – Ramadhan "Shami" Bizimana in Grey Matter
- 2012 – Dariel Arrechada and Javier Nuñez Florian in Una Noche
- 2013 – Sitthiphon Disamoe in The Rocket
- 2014 – Paul Schneider in Goodbye to All That
- 2015 – Gunnar Jónsson in Virgin Mountain

==== Best Actress in a Narrative Feature Film ====
- 2003 – Valeria Bruni Tedeschi in It's Easier for a Camel...
- 2004 – Fernanda Montenegro in O Outro Lado da Rua
- 2005 – Felicity Huffman in Transamerica
- 2006 – Eva Holubová in Holiday Makers
- 2007 – Marina Hands in Lady Chatterley
- 2008 – Eileen Walsh in Eden
- 2009 – Zoe Kazan in The Exploding Girl
- 2010 – Sibel Kekilli in When We Leave
- 2011 – Carice van Houten in Black Butterflies
- 2012 – Rachel Mwanza in War Witch
- 2013 – Veerle Baetens in The Broken Circle Breakdown
- 2014 – Valeria Bruni Tedeschi in Human Capital
- 2015 – Hannah Murray in Bridgend

==== Best Cinematography in a Narrative Feature ====
- 2011 – Lisa Tillinger for Artificial Paradises
- 2012 – Trevor Forrest and Shlomo Godder for Una Noche
- 2013 – Marius Matzow Gulbrandsen for Before Snowfall
- 2014 – Damian García for Gueros
- 2015 – Magnus Jønck for Bridgend

==== Best Screenplay in a Narrative Feature ====
- 2011 – Jannicke Systad Jacobsen for Turn Me On, Dammit!
- 2012 – Daniel Burman and Sergio Dubcovsky for La suerte en tus manos
- 2013 – Carl Joos and Felix Van Groeningen for The Broken Circle Breakdown
- 2014 – Guillaume Nicloux for The Kidnapping of Michel Houellebecq
- 2015 – Dagur Kári for Virgin Mountain

==== Best Narrative Editing ====
- 2014 – Keith Miller for Five Star
- 2015 – Oliver Bugge Coutté for Bridgend

=== U.S. Narrative Competition ===
In 2016, the festival separated its narrative award categories into U.S. and International films. The U.S. awards are as follows:

==== Best U.S. Narrative Feature ====
- 2016 – Dean, directed by Demetri Martin
- 2017 – Keep the Change, written and directed by Rachel Israel
- 2018 – Diane, written and directed by Kent Jones
- 2019 – Burning Cane, written and directed by Phillip Youmans
- 2020 – The Half of It, written and directed by Alice Wu
- 2021 – The Novice, written and directed by Lauren Hadaway
- 2022 - Good Girl Jane, written and directed by Sarah Elizabeth Mintz
- 2023 - Cypher, directed by Chris Moukarbel
- 2024 - Griffin in Summer, directed by Nicholas Colia
- 2025 - Charliebird
- 2026 - Cotton Fever, directed by Daniel Blake Schwartz

==== Best Actor in a U.S. Narrative Feature Film ====
- 2016 – Dominic Rains in Burn Country
- 2017 – Alessandro Nivola in One Percent More Humid
- 2018 – Jeffrey Wright in O.G
- 2019 – Wendell Pierce in Burning Cane
- 2020 – Steve Zahn in Cowboys
- 2021 – Matthew Leone in God's Waiting Room

==== Best Actress in a U.S. Narrative Feature Film ====
- 2016 – Mackenzie Davis in Always Shine
- 2017 – Nadia Alexander in Blame
- 2018 – Alia Shawkat in Duck Butter
- 2019 – Haley Bennett in Swallow
- 2020 – Assol Abdulina in Materna
- 2021 – Isabelle Furman in The Novice

==== Best Performance in a U.S. Narrative Feature ====
Since 2022, the festival has combined the "Best Actor" and "Best Actress" categories into a "Best Performance" category.

- 2022 - Rain Spencer in Good Girl Jane
- 2023 - Ji-young Yoo in Smoking Tigers
- 2024 - Jasmine Bearkiller Shangreaux in Jazzy
- 2025 - Gabriela Ochoa Perez in Charliebird
- 2026 - Marcel Ruiz, Paolo Schoene, and Kiki Montilla in Summer of Three

==== Best Cinematography in a U.S. Narrative Feature Film ====
- 2016 – Michael Ragen for Kicks
- 2017 – Chris Teague for Love After Love
- 2018 – Wyatt Garfield for Diane
- 2019 – Phillip Youmans for Burning Cane
- 2020 – Greta Zozula, Chananun Chotrungroj, and Kelly Jeffrey for Materna
- 2021 – Todd Martin for The Novice
- 2022 - Azuli Anderson for Next Exit
- 2023 - Caroline Costa for The Graduates
- 2024 - Alejandro Mejia for The Knife
- 2025 - Cedric Cheung-Lau for Esta Isla (This Island)
- 2026 - Tom Acton Fitzgerald for Cotton Fever

==== Best Screenplay in a U.S. Narrative Feature Film ====
- 2016 – Women Who Kill, written by Ingrid Jungermann
- 2017 – Abundant Acreage Available, written by Angus MacLachlan
- 2018 – Diane, written by Kent Jones
- 2019 – Blow the Man Down, written by Bridget Savage Cole and Danielle Krudy
- 2020 – Cowboys, written by Anna Kerrigan
- 2021 – Mark, Mary, and Some Other People, written by Hannah Marks
- 2022 – Allswell, written by Elizabeth Rodriguez
- 2023 - Smoking Tigers, written by So Young Shelly Yo
- 2024 - Griffin in Summer, written by Nicholas Colia
- 2025 - On a String, written by Isabel Hagen
- 2026 - Summer of Three, written by Carlitos Ruiz-Ruiz, Marcel Ruiz, and Mariana S. Belaval

=== International Narrative Competition ===
In 2016, the festival separated its narrative award categories into U.S. and International films. The international awards are as follows:

==== Best International Narrative Feature ====
- 2016 – Junction 48, directed by Udi Aloni
- 2017 – Son of Sofia (O Gios tis Sofias) written and directed by Elina Psykou
- 2018 - Smuggling Hendrix, directed by Marios Piperides
- 2019 – Scheme Birds, directed by Ellen Fiske and Ellinor Hallin
- 2020 – The Hater, directed by Jan Komasa
- 2021 – Brighton 4th, directed by Levan Koguashvili
- 2022 - January, directed by Viestur Kairish
- 2023 - A Strange Path, directed by Guto Parente
- 2024 - Bikechess, directed by Assel Aushakimova
- 2025 - Happy Birthday, directed by Sarah Goher
- 2026 - Labrador: Autopsy of Silence, directed by Rodrigue Jean

==== Best Actor in an International Narrative Feature ====
- 2016 - Alan Sabbagh in The Tenth Man
- 2017 – Guillermo Pfening in Nobody's Watching (Nadie Nos Mira)
- 2018 - Rasmus Bruun in Sankt Bernhard Syndikatet
- 2019 - Ali Atay in Noah Land
- 2020 – Noé Hernández in Kokoloko
- 2021 – Levan Tediashvili in Brighton 4th

==== Best Actress in an International Narrative Feature ====
- 2016 – Radhika Apte in Madly (Section : Clean Shaven)
- 2017 – Marie Leuenberger in The Divine Order (Die göttliche Ordnung)
- 2018 - Joy Rieger in Virgins
- 2019 – Park Ji-hu in House of Hummingbird
- 2020 – Shira Haas in Asia
- 2021 – Bassant Ahmed & Basmala Elghaiesh in Souad

==== Best Performance in an International Narrative Feature ====
Since 2022, the festival has combined the "Best Actor" and "Best Actress" categories into a "Best Performance" category.

- 2022 - Dorota Pomykala in Woman on a Roof
- 2023 - Carlos Francisco in A Strange Path
- 2024 - Yu Aier in Some Rain Must Fall
- 2025 - Andrea Riseborough and Brenda Blethyn in Dragonfly
- 2026 - Christopher Angatookalook in Labrador: Autopsy of Silence

==== Best Cinematography in an International Narrative Feature ====
- 2016 - Kjell Vassdal for El Clasico
- 2017 – Elvira Lind for Bobbi Jene
- 2018 - Albert Salas for Obey
- 2019 - Kang Gook-hyun for House of Hummingbird (Beol-sae)
- 2020 – Daniella Nowitz for Asia
- 2021 – Elisabeth Vogler for Roaring 20's
- 2022 - We Might As Well Be Dead
- 2023 - Linga Acácio for A Strange Path
- 2024 - Constanze Schmitt for Some Rain Must Fall
- 2025 - Lev Predan Kowarski for Little Trouble Girls
- 2026 - Mathieu Laverdière for Labrador: Autopsy of Silence

==== Best Screenplay in an International Narrative Feature ====
- 2016 - Perfect Strangers, written by Filippo Bologna, Paolo Costella, Paolo Genovese, Paola Mammini, and Rolando Ravello
- 2017 – Ice Mother (Bába z ledu), written by Bohdan Sláma
- 2018 - The Saint Bernard Syndicate, written by Lærke Sanderhoff
- 2019 - Noah Land (Nuh Tepesi), written by Cenk Ertürk
- 2020 – Tryst with Destiny, written by Prashant Nair
- 2021 – Brighton 4th, written by Boris Frumin
- 2022 - The Visitor, written by Martín Boulocq
- 2023 - A Strange Path, written by Guto Parente
- 2024 - The Freshly Cut Grass, written by Celina Murga, Juan Villegas, and Lucía Osorio
- 2025 - Happy Birthday, written by Mohamed Diab and Sarah Goher
- 2026 - Zejtune, written by Alex Camilleri

=== Best New Directors ===
==== Best New Narrative Filmmaker ====
- 2002 – Eric Eason for Manito
- 2003 – Valeria Bruni Tedeschi for It's Easier for a Camel...
- 2004 – Liu Fendou for Green Hat
- 2005 – Alicia Scherson for Play
- 2006 – Marwan Hamed for The Yacoubian Building
- 2007 – Enrique Begne for Two Embraces
- 2008 – Huseyin Karabey for My Marlon and Brando
- 2009 – Rune Denstad Langlo for North
- 2010 – Kim Chapiron for Dog Pound
- 2011 – Park Jung-bum for The Journals of Musan
- 2012 – Lucy Mulloy for Una Noche
- 2013 – Emanuel Hoss-Desmarais for Whitewash
- 2014 – Josef Wladyka for Manos Sucias
- 2015 – Zachary Treitz for Men Go to Battle
- 2017 – Rachel Israel for Keep the Change
- 2019 – Ellen Fiske and Ellinor Hallin for Scheme Birds
- 2020 – Gaspar Antillo for Nobody Knows I'm Here
- 2021 – Nana Mensah for Queen of Glory
- 2022 - Michelle Garza Cervera for Huesera
- 2024 - Nnamdi Asomugha for The Knife
- 2025 - Lorraine Jones Molina and Cristian Carretero for Esta Isla (This Island)
- 2026 - Miiku Sakanishi for Memorizu

==== Best New Documentary Filmmaker ====
- 2004 – Paulo Sacramento for The Prisoner of the Iron Bars: Self-Portraits
- 2005 – Jeff Zimbalist and Matt Mochary for Favela Rising
- 2006 – Pelin Esmer for The Play
- 2007 – Vardan Hovhannisyan for A Story of People in War and Peace
- 2008 – Carlos Carcass for Old Man Bebo
- 2009 – Ian Olds for Fixer: The Taking of Ajmal Naqshbandi
- 2010 – Clio Barnard for The Arbor
- 2011 – Pablo Croce for Like Water
- 2013 – Sean Dunne for Oxyana
- 2014 – Alan Hicks for Keep On Keepin' On
- 2015 – Ewan McNicol and Anna Sandilands for Uncertain
- 2016 – David Feige for Untouchable
- 2017 – Sarita Khurana and Smriti Mundhra for A Suitable Girl
- 2020 – Jessica Earnshaw for Jacinta
- 2021 – Jessica Kingdon for Ascension
- 2022 – Edward Buckles Jr. for Katrina Babies
- 2025 – Augusto Zegarra for Runa Simi
- 2026 - Dione Roach and Steve Happi for Jail Time Records

=== Documentary ===
==== Best Documentary Feature ====
- 2002 – Chiefs, directed by Daniel Junge
- 2003 – A Normal Life, directed by Elizabeth Chai Vasarhelyi and Hugo Berkeley
- 2004 – Kill Your Idols, directed by Scott Crary
- 2005 – El Perro Negro: Stories from the Spanish Civil War, directed by Péter Forgács
- 2006 – The War Tapes, directed by Deborah Scranton
- 2007 – Taxi to the Dark Side, directed by Alex Gibney
- 2008 – Pray the Devil Back to Hell, directed by Gini Reticker
- 2009 – Racing Dreams, directed by Marshall Curry
- 2010 – Monica & David, directed by Alexandra Codina
- 2011 – Bombay Beach, directed by Alma Har'el
- 2012 – The World Before Her, directed by Nisha Pahuja
- 2013 – The Kill Team, directed by Dan Krauss
- 2014 – Point and Shoot, directed by Marshall Curry
- 2015 – Democrats, directed by Camilla Nielsson
- 2017 – Bobbi Jene, directed by Elvira Lind
- 2020 – Socks on Fire, directed by Bo McGuire
- 2021 – Ascension, directed by Jessica Kingdon
- 2022 – The Cave of Adullam, directed by Laura Checkoway
- 2025 – Natchez, directed by Suzannah Herbert
- 2026 - Jail Time Records directed by Dione Roach and Steve Happi

==== Best Cinematography in a Documentary ====
- 2021 – Bing Liu & Joshua Altman for All These Sons
- 2022 – Boris Levy for The Wild One
- 2025 - Chance Falkner and Johnny Friday for The Last Dive

==== Best Documentary Editing ====
- 2017 – Adam Nielson for Bobbi Jene
- 2020 – Amy Foete for Father, Soldier, Son
- 2021 – Shannon Swan for The Kids
- 2025 - Soren B. Ebbe and Hayedeh Safiyari for An Eye for an Eye
- 2026 - Viridiana Lieberman and Rebecca Adorno for Jean-Michel Basquiat

=== Shorts ===
==== Best Narrative Short ====
- 2002 – Bamboleho, directed by Luis Prieto
- 2004 – Shock Act, directed by Seth Grossman
- 2005 – Cashback, directed by Sean Ellis
- 2006 – The Shovel, directed by Nick Childs
- 2007 – The Last Dog in Rwanda, directed by Jens Assur
- 2008 – New Boy, directed by Steph Green
- 2009 – The North Road, directed by Carlos Chahine
- 2010 – Father Christmas Doesn't Come Here, written by Bongi Ndaba, Sibongile Nkosana directed by Bekhi Sibiya
- 2013 – The Nightshift Belongs to the Stars, directed by Edoardo Ponti
- 2014 – The Phone Call, directed by Mat Kirkby
- 2015 – Listen, directed by Hamy Ramezan and Rungano Nyoni
- 2017 – Retouch, directed by Kaveh Mazaheri
- 2020 – No More Wings, directed by Abraham Adeyemi
- 2025 - Beyond Silence, directed by Marnie Blok

==== Best Documentary Short ====
- 2002 – All Water Has a Perfect Memory, directed by Natalia Almada
- 2003 – Milton Rogovin: The Forgotten Ones, directed by Harvey Wang
- 2004 – Sister Rose's Passion, directed by Oren Jacoby
- 2005 – The Life of Kevin Carter, directed by Dan Krauss
- 2006 – Native New Yorker, directed by Steve Bilich
- 2007 – A Son's Sacrifice, directed by Yoni Brook
- 2008 – Mandatory Service, directed by Jessica Habie
- 2009 – Home, directed by Mathew Faust
- 2010 – White Lines and the Fever: The Death of DJ Junebug, directed by Travis Senger
- 2013 – Coach, directed by Bess Kargman
- 2014 – One Year Lease, directed by Brian Bolster
- 2015 – Body Team 12, directed by David Darg
- 2017 – The Good Fight, directed by Ben Holman
- 2020 – My Father The Mover, directed by Julia Jansch
- 2021 – Coded, directed by Ryan White
- 2022 – Heart Valley, directed by Christian Cargill
- 2025 - I hope this email finds you well, directed by Asia Zughaiar

==== Best Animated Short ====
- 2017 – Odd is an Egg (Odd er et egg) directed by Kristin Ulseth
- 2023 – Starling directed by Mitra Shahidi
- 2025 – Playing God directed by Matteo Burani
- 2026 – Violet and Marlowe Rob a Bank directed by Wesley Wang

=== Viewpoints ===
Viewpoints is dedicated to discovering the most boundary-pushing, rule-breaking new voices in independent film. Starting in 2024, films selected in the Viewpoints section were presented in competition.

- 2026 - The Critics and Pietra Brettkelly for Crocodiles

=== Student Visionary Award ===
- 2004 – 'Independent Lens' (American Made), directed by Sharat Raju
- 2005 – Dance Mania Fantastic, directed by Sasie Sealy
- 2006 – Dead End Job, directed by Samantha Davidson Green
- 2007 – Good Luck Nedim, directed by Marko Santic and Someone Else's War, directed by Lee Wang
- 2008 – Elephant Garden, directed by Sasie Sealy
- 2009 – Small Change, directed by Anna McGrath
- 2010 – some boys don't leave, directed by Maggie Kiley
- 2013 – Life Doesn't Frighten Me, directed by Stephen Dunn
- 2014 – Nesma's Bird, directed by Najwan Ali and Medoo Ali
- 2015 – Catwalk, directed by Ninja Thyberg
- 2017 – Fry Day, directed by Laura Moss
- 2020 – Cru-Raw, directed by David Oesch
- 2021 – Six Nights, directed by Robert Brogden

=== Nora Ephron Prize ===
The Nora Ephron Prize "honor[s] an exceptional female filmmaker who represents the spirit and vision of the legendary filmmaker and writer."

- 2013 – Meera Menon for Farah Goes Bang
- 2014 – Talya Lavie for Zero Motivation
- 2015 – Laura Bispuri for Sworn Virgin
- 2016 – Rachel Tunnard for Adult Life Skills
- 2017 – Petra Volpe, writer/director of The Divine Order
- 2018 – Nia DaCosta, for Little Woods
- 2019 – Rania Attieh for Initials S.G.
- 2020 – Ruthy Pribar for Asia
- 2026 – Dina Duma for Skateboarding Is Not for Girls

=== Storyscapes Award ===
- 2017 — TREEHUGGER : WAWONA created by Barnaby Steel, Ersin Han Ersin and Robin McNicholas

=== Audience Awards ===
==== Narrative Award ====
- 2015 – King Jack, directed by Felix Thompson
- 2016 – Here Alone, directed by Rod Blackhurst
- 2017 – The Divine Order, directed by Petra Volpe
- 2018 – To Dust, directed by Shawn Snyder
- 2019 – Plus One, written and directed by Jeff Chan and Andrew Rhymer
- 2021 – Catch the Fair One, written and directed by Josef Kubota Wladyka
- 2022 - In Her Name, written and directed by Sarah Carter
- 2023 - The Perfect Find, directed by Numa Perrier

==== Documentary Award ====
- 2016 – The Return, directed by Kelly Duane and Katie Galloway
- 2017 – Hondros, directed by Greg Campbell
- 2018 – United Skates, directed by Dyana Winkler and Tina Brown
- 2019 – Gay Chorus Deep South, directed by David Charles Rodrigues
- 2021 – Blind Ambition, directed by Warwick Ross and Robert Coe

=== Audio Storytelling Awards ===
In 2022, Tribeca added an audio storytelling awards category.

==== Fiction Audio Storytelling Award ====
- 2022 – The Hollowed Out by Brit and Nick Kewin
- 2023 – The Very Worst Thing That Could Possibly Happen by Alex Kemp
- 2024 – The Skies Are Watching by Jon Frechette and Todd Luoto

==== Narrative Nonfiction Audio Storytelling Award ====
- 2022 – Mother Country Radicals by Zayd Ayers Dohrn
- 2023 – Free From Desire by Aline Laurent-Mayard
- 2024 – Delejos by Julie Piñero and Cristal Duhaime

==== Independent Fiction Audio Storytelling Award ====
- 2023 – Aisha by Cory Choy and Feyiṣayo Aluko
- 2024 – Red for Revolution by Jana Naomi Smith

==== Independent Nonfiction Audio Storytelling Award ====
- 2023 – Shalom, Amore by David Modigliani
- 2024 – Back to the Water: More Than One by Catherine Jaffee, Pippa Ehrlich, and Zolani Mahola

=== Tribeca Games Award ===
The Tribeca Games Award honors an unreleased video game, "recognizing its potential for excellence in art and storytelling through design, artistic mastery and highly immersive worlds."

- 2021 – Norco (inaugural award)
- 2022 - Thirsty Suitors
- 2023 - Goodbye Volcano High
- 2024 - Goodnight Universe
- 2025 - Cairn
- 2026 - There Are No Ghosts at the Grand

== See also ==
- Tribeca Film Institute
