= Sara Zarr =

American writer

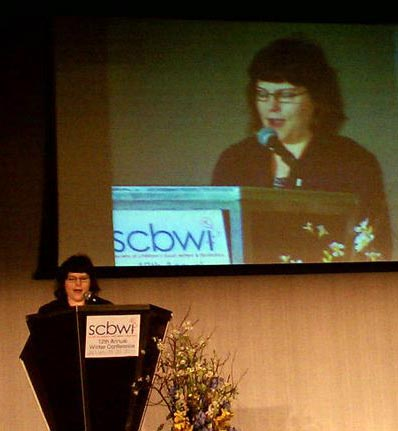
- Zarr at the 2011 SCBWI conference
- Born: October 3, 1970 (age 55); Cleveland, Ohio, United States
- Occupation: Writer
- Writing career
- Period: 2007 - present
- Genres: Young adult fiction, essays, short fiction
- Website: sarazarr.com

Sara Zarr (born October 3, 1970) is an American writer. She was raised in San Francisco, and now lives in Salt Lake City, Utah with her husband. Her first novel, Story of a Girl, was a 2007 National Book Award finalist. She has subsequently had nine novels published.

== Biography and career ==
Born in Cleveland, Ohio and raised in San Francisco, she earned a degree in communications from San Francisco State University. Zarr grew up as part of a Jesus Movement church. Her first three manuscripts were never published, but after winning the Utah Arts Council prize for best unpublished young adult novel of 2003, she was able to find an agent who successfully sold Story of a Girl as the first of a two-book deal, to Little, Brown Books for Young Readers.

Inspired by the kidnapping of Elizabeth Smart and Zarr's Christian roots, her third book, Once Was Lost (also published as What We Lost) addresses issues of faith, identity and home. The original title comes from the hymn Amazing Grace written by John Newton. While the characters are Christian, the book was published for a mainstream audience and neither promotes nor criticizes organized religion.

In 2008, Zarr contributed to the young adult for Obama project started by fellow YA author Maureen Johnson.

Zarr was a regular contributor to Image Journal's Good Letters blog.

In 2010, she served as a judge for the National Book Awards.

In 2013, Zarr joined the faculty of Lesley University’s Low-Residency Master of Fine Arts in Creative Writing program.

From 2012-2015; 2020-present Zarr hosted and produced the podcast This Creative Life. It featured Zarr in conversation with other writers. She has self-published a companion book to the podcast.

With her 2017 novel, Gem & Dixie (loosely based on some of her early life experiences), Zarr moved to the HarperCollins imprint Balzer + Bray, and has another book slated with them for 2018.

Story of a Girl was adapted into a television movie that will air on Lifetime starting in July 2017. It marks Kyra Sedgwick's directorial debut and features Sedgewick's husband, Kevin Bacon.

== Bibliography ==
=== Standalone novels ===
- 2007 — Story of a Girl
- 2008 — Sweethearts
- 2009 — Once Was Lost (Republished as What We Lost in 2013, then reverted to original title)
- 2011 — How to Save a Life
- 2013 — The Lucy Variations
- 2013 — Roomies co-written with Tara Altebrando
- 2017 — Gem & Dixie
- 2020 — Goodbye from Nowhere
- 2020 — Courageous Creativity: Advice and Encouragement for the Creative Life
- 2022 — A Song Called Home
- 2024 — Kyra, Just for Today

Zarr has also read the audio versions of four of her books.

=== Short fiction ===
- "This Is My Audition Monologue" appears in Geektastic: Stories from the Nerd Herd, edited by Holly Black and Cecil Castellucci, 2009
- "Train" appears in the Spring 2016 issue of Relief: A Journal of Art and Faith

=== Essays ===
- "It Is Good" appears in Does This Book Make Me Look Fat?, edited by Marissa Walsh, 2008
- "Who Is My Mother, Who Are My Brothers?" first appeared in Image, and appears in Jesus Girls: True Tales of Growing Up Female and Evangelical, edited by Hannah Faith Notess, 2009

== Awards and nominations ==
- Story of a Girl - 2007 National Book Award finalist; 2008 American Library Association Best Books for Young Adults
- Sweethearts - 2008 Cybil Award Finalist; 2009 American Library Association Best Books for Young Adults, Utah Book Award Finalist
- Story of a Girl (audiobook) - 2009 American Library Association Amazing Audiobooks for Young Adults
- Once Was Lost - 2009 Utah Book Award Winner, INSPY Award Winner
- How to Save a Life - 2011 Utah Book Award Winner, Salt Lake City Weekly Arty Award Winner for Fiction
- Gem & Dixie - 2017 PEN Los Angeles Literary Prize Finalist

== Personal life ==
Zarr has spoken and written openly about growing up in an alcoholic family system and its influences on her writing. She was married in 1990; she and her husband have no children.
