= Maggie Kang =

South Korean and Canadian writer and director (born 1982)

- Kang in 2026
- Born: January 27, 1982 (age 44); Seoul, South Korea
- Citizenship: Canada
- Education: Sheridan College
- Occupations: Storyboard artist; writer; director
- Notable work: KPop Demon Hunters
- Spouse: Radford Sechrist
- Children: 1
- Honours: Okgwan Order of Cultural Merit (2025)

Korean name
- Hangul: 강민지
- RR: Gang Minji
- MR: Kang Minji

Maggie Kang (born January 27, 1982) is a South Korean and Canadian storyboard artist, writer, and director. She is best known for creating the story for KPop Demon Hunters (2025), which she co-wrote and directed with Chris Appelhans. The film earned the duo two Annie Awards, a Golden Globe Award, and an Academy Award.

== Life and education ==
Kang was born in Seoul, South Korea. When she was five, her family moved to Toronto, Canada, for her father's work. The family decided to stay in Canada, and Kang grew up there. She studied animation at Sheridan College in Ontario.

== Career ==
In her third year at college, Kang was recruited to DreamWorks Animation. She served as a story artist for such animated films as Puss in Boots (2011), Rise of the Guardians (2012), and Kung Fu Panda 3 (2016). She served as head of story for The Lego Ninjago Movie (2017).

In 2018, Kang developed the concept for KPop Demon Hunters (2025). She has cited numerous inspirations for the film: Twice and Blackpink for the fictional K-pop girl group Huntrix; Monsta X for the fictional boy band the Saja Boys; and The Host for the film's tone and style. In a lunch meeting, she pitched the idea to Sony, which bought the rights and began development one week later. Kang said Ejae's song demos helped get KPop Demon Hunters greenlit. She directed the flim with Chris Appelhans.

In March 2026, it was announced that a sequel is planned for release in 2029. Kang and Appelhans negotiated a contract with Netflix for the sequel: a five-year, $10 million-per-year plus a share of ancillary revenue from the franchise.

In April 2026, Kang signed with agency The Present Company to launch activities in South Korea.

== Personal life ==
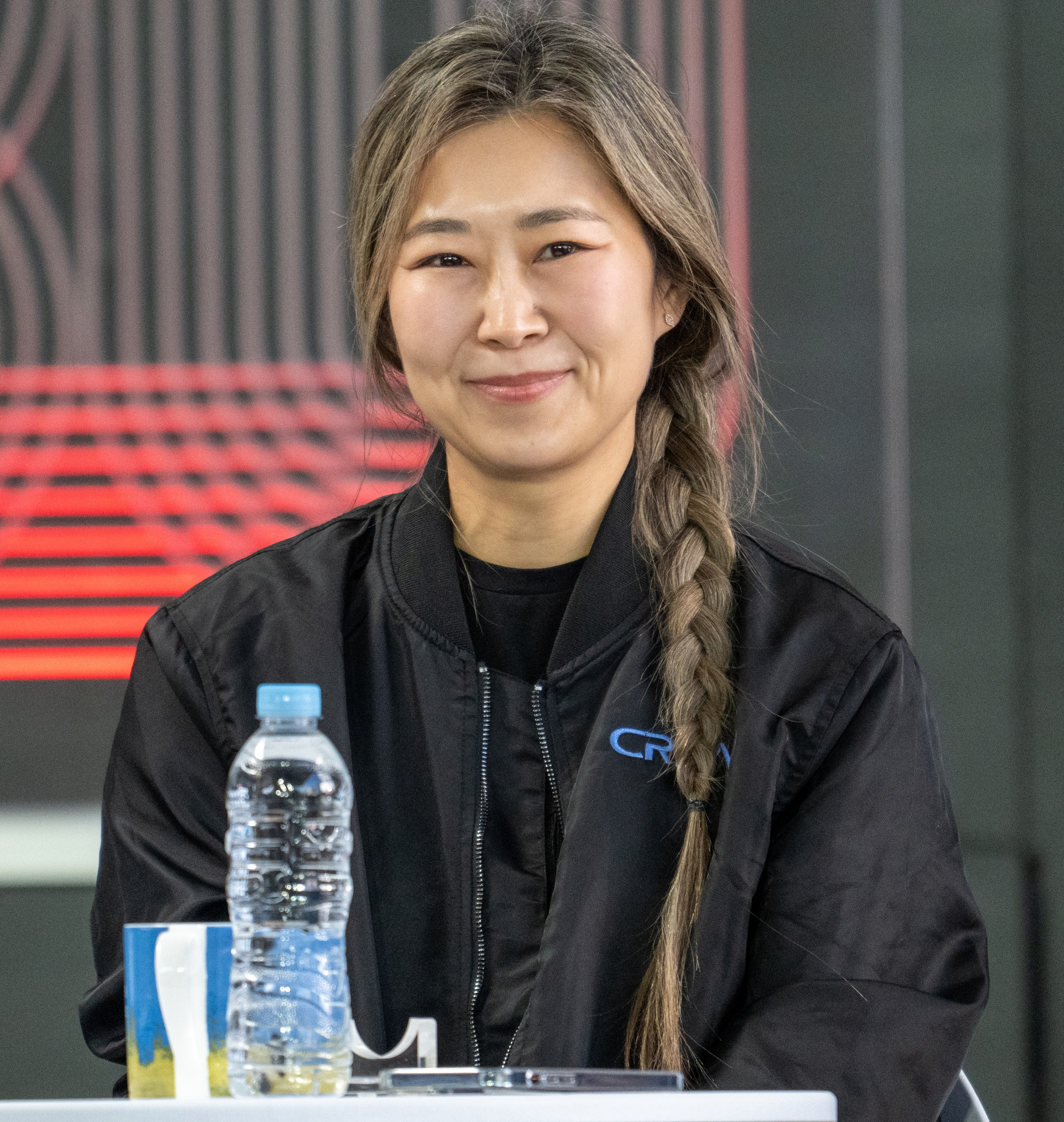
Kang in 2025

Kang is married to Radford Sechrist, creator of Netflix series Kipo and the Age of Wonderbeasts. In 2020, Sechrist said that Kang took him to BTS concerts, and said the K-pop genre was close to his heart.

She has said that Sechrist gave her the idea for merging Korean mythology and K-pop, and that they thought up the concept for the animation film K-Pop Demon Hunters. Sechrist is said to have designed characters and written "a lot of the scenes" for the film. Sechrist designed the Derpy Tiger character in the film, basing it upon minhwa and his cat Yumyan.

Sechrist and Kang have a daughter, who voiced the younger Rumi in KPop Demon Hunters.

== Filmography ==
| Year | Title | Role | Notes | Ref. |
|---|---|---|---|---|
| 2025 | KPop Demon Hunters | Director | Netflix original film | |
| 2026 | KEEP SWIMMING with BTS | Herself | Short-form mini-documentary | |

== Accolades ==
=== Awards and nominations ===
| Year | Award | Category | Work | Result | Ref. |
|---|---|---|---|---|---|
| 2025 | Alliance of Women Film Journalists | Best Animated Feature | KPop Demon Hunters (with Chris Appelhans) | Won | |
| 2025 | Austin Film Critics Association | The Robert R. "Bobby" McCurdy Memorial Breakthrough Award | KPop Demon Hunters | Won | |
| 2025 | Celebration of Asian Pacific Cinema and Television | Animation Award | KPop Demon Hunters | Won | |
| 2025 | The Female Lead | Women of the Year | KPop Demon Hunters | Honored | |
| 2025 | IndieWire Honors | Spark Award | KPop Demon Hunters (with Chris Appelhans and Ejae) | Honored | |
| 2025 | KALH Honors | Pioneer Award | KPop Demon Hunters | Honored | |
| 2025 | Korean Association of Film Critics Awards | FIPRESCI Award (Foreign) | KPop Demon Hunters (with Chris Appelhans) | Won | |
| 2025 | Marie Claire Asia Star Awards | Director of the Year | KPop Demon Hunters | Won | |
| 2025 | TikTok Korea Awards | Entertainment of the Year Award | KPop Demon Hunters | Won | |
| 2025 | Toronto Film Critics Association | Best Animated Feature | KPop Demon Hunters (with Chris Appelhans) | Runner-up | |
| 2025 | World Animation Summit | Movie of the Year Award | KPop Demon Hunters (with Chris Appelhans) | Honored | |
| 2026 | Academy Awards | Best Animated Feature | KPop Demon Hunters (with Chris Appelhans and Michelle Wong) | Won | |
| 2026 | Annie Awards | Best Direction – Feature | KPop Demon Hunters (with Chris Appelhans) | Won | |
| 2026 | Annie Awards | Best Writing – Feature | KPop Demon Hunters (with Chris Appelhans, Danya Jimenez, Hannah McMechan) | Won | |
| 2026 | Asia Game Changer Awards SoCal | Entertainment Game Changer | KPop Demon Hunters | Honored | |
| 2026 | Astra Film Awards | Best Animated Feature | KPop Demon Hunters (with Chris Appelhans and Michelle Wong) | Won | |
| 2026 | Chicago Indie Critics | Best Animated Film | KPop Demon Hunters (with Chris Appelhans and Michelle Wong) | Won | |
| 2026 | Critics' Choice Movie Awards | Best Animated Feature | KPop Demon Hunters (with Chris Appelhans and Michelle Wong) | Won | |
| 2026 | Departure Festival + Conference | Cultural Innovator Award | KPop Demon Hunters | Honored | |
| 2026 | Golden Globe Awards | Best Motion Picture – Animated | KPop Demon Hunters (with Chris Appelhans and Michelle Wong) | Won | |
| 2026 | Hugo Awards | Best Dramatic Presentation, Long Form | KPop Demon Hunters (with Chris Appelhans, Danya Jimenez, Hannah McMechan) | Nominated | |
| 2026 | Humanitas Prize | Family Feature | KPop Demon Hunters (with Chris Appelhans, Danya Jimenez, Hannah McMechan) | Nominated | |
| 2026 | International Cinephile Society | Best Animated Film | KPop Demon Hunters (with Chris Appelhans) | Nominated | |
| 2026 | Latino Entertainment Journalists Association | Best Animated Feature | KPop Demon Hunters (with Chris Appelhans) | Won | |
| 2026 | Nebula Award | Ray Bradbury Nebula Award for Outstanding Dramatic Presentation | KPop Demon Hunters (with Danya Jimenez, Hannah McMechan) | Nominated | |
| 2026 | VIEW Conference | Trailblazer Award | KPop Demon Hunters | Honored | |

== Other accolades ==
=== State and cultural honours ===
Name of country or organization, award ceremony, year given, and name of honor
| Country or organization | Award ceremony | Year | Honor | Ref. |
|---|---|---|---|---|
| South Korea | Korea Content Awards | 2025 | Okgwan Order of Cultural Merit (4th class) | |
| City of Toronto | Departure Honours | 2026 | Key to the City | |

=== Listicles ===
| Publisher | Year | Listicle | Placement | Ref. |
|---|---|---|---|---|
| Forbes | 2025 | 100 Most Powerful Women (Note: with The female creators and cast of the Netflix animated film KPop Demon Hunters) | 100th | |
| Toronto Life | 2025 | 50 Most Influential | 9th | |
| Time | 2025 | Time100 Next Innovator | Included | |
| Creative | 2026 | Creative 100 Directors (Note: with Chris Appelhans) | Included | |
| Gold House | 2026 | Gold100 List (Note: with Michelle Wong, Arden Cho, May Hong, Ji-young Yoo, Ejae, Audrey Nuna & Rei Ami) | Included | |
| The Hollywood Reporter | 2026 | Animation Power List | Included | |
