= Achiraya Nitibhon =

Thai actress and singer (born 2004)

- Thai: อชิรญา นิติพน
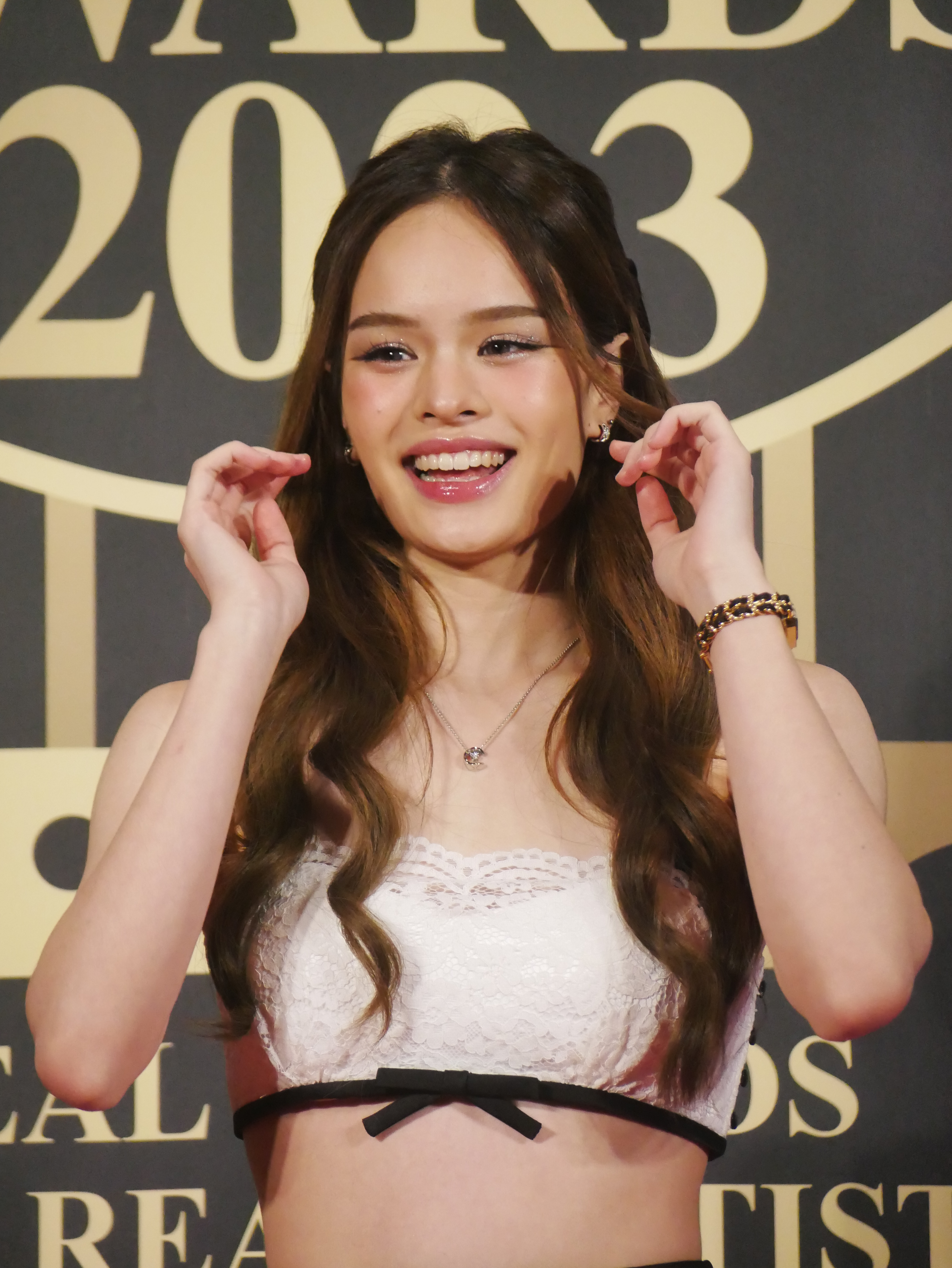
- Achiraya in 2023
- Born: 18 March 2004 (age 22); Bangkok, Thailand
- Other name: Ally
- Education: Berklee College of Music
- Occupations: Actress; singer
- Years active: 2018–present
- Musical career
- Genre: Pop
- Instrument: Vocals
- Years active: 2019–present
- Label: 411 Entertainment

Achiraya Nitibhon (Thai: อชิรญา นิติพน, RTGS: Achiraya Nitiphon; born 18 March 2004), also known as Ally (/eɪlli/, stylized in all caps, Thai: แอลลี่; born 18 March 2004), is a Thai singer and actress.

== Early life and education ==
Born in Bangkok in 2004, her father is the musician Amarin Nitibhon and her mother is Thai-American Joy Achariya Angkasuwansir. Her aunt is model and actress Apasiri Nitibhon. She attended the International Community School in Bangkok for her high school education. In 2021, she was accepted to study online classes at the Berklee College of Music.

== Career ==
=== Music ===
Signed with the Thai company 411 Entertainment, she released her first music single in 2020, "How To Love," featuring Korean rapper Gray. The song peaked at number one on the Top 100: Thailand.

In 2021, she won in the Best Female Performer category at the Kazz Awards. That year, she performed at the Phaya Thai Palace as part of the Disney+ Hotstar launch in Thailand. She also collaborated with stablemates AR3NA on the song Ride On.

In 2023, she released Passcode (Only One Person Knows) and worked with music producer The Toys on ZiGZaG.

=== Acting ===
She appeared in the Thai film Brother of the Year in 2018, playing the younger version of the character played by Urassaya Sperbund.

From 2024, she could be seen in Thai crime drama The Believers, available worldwide on Netflix, and winner of the best series prize at the Nataraja Awards in Thailand in 2025. She was later cast in K-Pop set thriller film Perfect Girl alongside Adeline Rudolph and Arden Cho.

== Discography ==
=== Digital singles ===
- How To Love (2020)
- Boys Like You (2022)
- Heartbeat (2022)
- Passcode (2023)
- ZigZag (2023)
- Make It Hot (feat. Pink Sweat$) (2024)
- OH MY! (2024)
- The Power of Power (with Artiwara Kongmalai) (2025)
- No, Thanks (with JETAIME) (2025)
- 808 (with JETAIME) (2025)
- but you (feat. JHIN) (2026)
- 143 (2026)

=== Special singles ===
- No Matter What I Do (2020)
- Handkerchief (2020)
- Star (2021)

=== Collaborations ===
- Ride On feat AR3NA (2021)
- ทดลองใช้ (เป็นได้อีกเยอะ Version) feat Thongchai McIntyre (2022)
- C-Through Beauty' feat The Toys (2023)

== Filmography ==
=== Film ===
Year	Title	Role	Ref.
2018	Brother of the Year	Teenage Jane	
TBA	Perfect Girl †	TBA	Filming

=== Television ===
Year	Title	Role	Network	Notes	Ref.
2016	เด็กไม่เอาถ่าน (Good for nothing)		Thai PBS		
2024	The Believers	Dear	Netflix	Main	

== Awards and nominations ==
Year	Event	Category	Nominated work	Result	Ref.
2021	KAZZ AWARDS	Female Teenage Of The Year		Nominated	
2021	KAZZ AWARDS	Popular Female Artist Award		Won	
