= Georgia Lee (director) =

American writer and director (born 1976)

- Born: 1976 (age 49–50); Philadelphia, Pennsylvania, U.S.
- Education: Harvard University (BA)
- Occupation: Film director
- Years active: 1998-present
- Known for: Red Doors

Georgia Lee (born 1976) is an American writer and director known for her 2006 film Red Doors. Lee has also written and directed episodes of The Expanse and The 100. She has also developed and serves as the showrunner for the Netflix series Partner Track based on the novel of the same name by Helen Wan.

== Early life and education ==
Lee was born in Philadelphia, Pennsylvania, to immigrants from Taiwan. She was raised primarily in Waterford, Connecticut in the same house featured in her film Red Doors. She has a younger sister, Kathy Shao-Lin Lee.

Lee was ranked first in her senior year at Waterford High School. She then attended Harvard University, where she received a Bachelor of Arts in biochemistry. She took courses toward an MBA but did not complete the program. After graduation, Lee worked for the management consulting firm McKinsey & Company.

== Career ==
Lee apprenticed on Gangs of New York after its director Martin Scorsese saw Lee's first short film, The Big Dish. Lee's next short film was Educated (2001), which was shown in over 30 festivals around the world.

Lee wrote and directed the feature film Red Doors. It won the Best Narrative Feature Award in the NY, NY Competition at the 2005 Tribeca Film Festival. It also won the Special Jury Award for Ensemble Acting at CineVegas, and the Audience Award and the Grand Jury Award for Screenwriting at Outfest.

Lee has served as juror for both the Sundance Film Festival and Tribeca Film Festival.

== Filmography ==
=== Feature film ===
Year	Title	Director	Writer	Producer	Notes
2005	Red Doors	Yes	Yes	Yes	
2017	Capture	Yes	No	Executive	

=== Television series ===
Year	Title	Creator	Writer	Executive producer	Notes
2015–18	The Expanse	No	Yes (4)	Co-producer	Staff writer (season 1); Story editor (season 2)
2019	The 100	No	Yes (1)	Producer	
2022	Partner Track	Developer	Yes (2)	Yes	
2023	Carnival Row	No	No	Supervising	

== See also ==
- List of female film and television directors
- List of LGBT-related films directed by women
