= The Believers (TV series) =

Thai television series

- Promotional poster
- Genre: Crime drama
- Created by: Wattanapong Wongwan
- Written by: Aummaraporn Phandintong; Watcharapol Paksri; Asamaporn Samakphan; Perapat Rukngam; Jiraporn Sae-lee
- Story by: Wattanapong Wongwan
- Directed by: Wattanapong Wongwan
- Starring: Pachara Chirathivat; Teeradon Supapunpinyo; Achiraya Nitibhon
- Country of origin: Thailand
- Original language: Thai
- No. of seasons: 2
- No. of episodes: 17

Production
- Producers: Chanajai Tonsaithong; Somprasong Srikrajang
- Cinematography: Kittiwat Semarat (Director of Photography); Krisanapol Somnuke (Director of Photography)
- Editors: Paradorn Vesurai; Teerapong Limthongchai
- Running time: 37–59 minutes
- Production companies: Joy Luck Club Film House; Deluxe Production

Original release
- Network: Netflix
- Release: March 27, 2024 – December 4, 2025

The Believers (Thai: สาธุ) is a Thai crime drama television series depicting the use of Buddhist piety as a facade for criminal enterprise and mass deception. The first season of the series was released worldwide on Netflix on 27 March 2024. A second season was released globally on Netflix on 4 December 2025.

== Premise ==
Following the failure of their start-up business, three entrepreneurs exploit the generously funded but loosely regulated system of donations to Buddhist temples.

== Cast ==
=== Main cast ===
- Teeradon Supapunpinyo as Win
- Pachara Chirathivat as Game
- Achiraya Nitibhon as Dear
- Patchai Pakdesusuk as Monk Dol
- Channarong Khantheethao as Taeng
- Paopetch Charoensook as Monk Ekkachai
- Surasee Phatham as Abbot Kiw
- Jintara Sukaphatana as Nuchnat
- Pramod Sangsorn as Yod
- Manutsanun Phanlerdwongsakul as PCM. Ae

=== Supporting cast ===
- Michael Shaowanasai as Abbot Songchai
- Surasee Ithikul as MP. Wut
- Sarun Naraprasertkul as Aun
- Phuwasit Ananbhornsiri as Suea
- Rasmee Wayrana as Ple
- Nat Klinmalee as Pond

=== Additional cast (Season 2) ===
- Chris Tangsilsat as Ring announcer

=== Guest Starring ===
- Phiravich Attachitsataporn as Himself

== Production ==
The Believers is created by Aummaraporn Phandintong and had the original title Sathu. It is produced by Joy Luck Club Film House and Deluxe Production.

The series is directed by Wattanapong Wongwan. The cast includes Teeradon Supapunpinyo, Achiraya Nitibhon, Paopetch Charoensook and Pachara Chirathivat.

== Episodes ==
Season	Episodes	Originally released
1	9	March 27, 2024
2	8	December 4, 2025

=== Season 1 (2024) ===
No.	Title	Original release date
1	"To live is to want" (อยู่อย่างอยาก)	March 27, 2024
2	"Good deeds" (กุศลกรรม)	March 27, 2024
3	"We found you lost" (สังสารวฏ)	March 27, 2024
4	"The joy of giving" (ผู้ให้ย่อมเป็นสุข)	March 27, 2024
5	"Fallen" (กิเลส)	March 27, 2024
6	"Beelievers" (ที่ผึ้งทางใจ)	March 27, 2024
7	"Empty promises" (ลมปาก)	March 27, 2024
8	"Miracles only happen to those who believe in them" (ศรัทธามา ปาฏิหาริย์มี)	March 27, 2024
9	"The eternal wheel" (กงเกวียนกำเกวียน)	March 27, 2024

=== Season 2 (2025) ===
No.	Title	Original release date
1	"The Tree of Dhamma" (ต้นไม้แห่งธรรม)	December 4, 2025
2	"Wheel of Faith" (วงล้อแห่งศรัทธา)	December 4, 2025
3	"Quest" (แสวงหา)	December 4, 2025
4	"Sanctuary" (ที่พักใจ)	December 4, 2025
5	"Becoming" (ตัวตน คนใหม่)	December 4, 2025
6	"Redemption" (เงินบุญ ไถ่บาป)	December 4, 2025
7	"Revelation" (ความจริงปรากฏ)	December 4, 2025
8	"Wounds and Wonders" (บาดแผลและสัจธรรม)	December 4, 2025

== Original soundtrack ==
Theme song

- "สาธุ (SAA-TUU)" by MILLI ft. TangBadVoice

Insert theme

- "ไอ้หนุ่มรถไถ" by Sayan Sanya
- "บักคนซั่ว" by Sornnarin Pimpa
- "วันหวยออก" by Nopparat Maihom
- "สวัสดีปีใหม่" by Thongchai McIntyre
- "Run" by Phum Viphurit

== Reception ==
The series won for Best Series at the Nataraja Awards in 2025.
