= KPop Demon Hunters =

2025 animated film by Maggie Kang and Chris Appelhans

- Netflix release poster
- Directed by: Maggie Kang; Chris Appelhans
- Screenplay by: Danya Jimenez; Hannah McMechan; Maggie Kang; Chris Appelhans
- Story by: Maggie Kang
- Produced by: Michelle Wong
- Starring: Arden Cho; Ahn Hyo-seop; May Hong; Ji-young Yoo; Yunjin Kim; Daniel Dae Kim; Ken Jeong; Lee Byung-hun
- Cinematography: Gary H. Lee
- Edited by: Nathan Schauf
- Music by: Marcelo Zarvos
- Production company: Sony Pictures Animation
- Distributed by: Netflix
- Release date: June 20, 2025
- Running time: 95 minutes
- Country: United States
- Language: English
- Budget: $100 million+
- Box office: $24.7 million

KPop Demon Hunters is a 2025 American animated musical urban fantasy film co-written and directed by Maggie Kang and Chris Appelhans. Produced by Sony Pictures Animation for Netflix, the film stars the voices of Arden Cho, Ahn Hyo-seop, May Hong, Ji-young Yoo, Yunjin Kim, Daniel Dae Kim, Ken Jeong, and Lee Byung-hun. The story follows a K-pop girl group, Huntrix (Rumi, Mira, and Zoey), who lead double lives as demon hunters. They face off against a rival boy band, the Saja Boys, whose members are secretly demons.

The film originated from Kang's desire to create a story inspired by her Korean heritage, drawing on elements of mythology, demonology, and K-pop to craft a visually distinct and culturally rooted film. Production began in March 2021. The look of the film was influenced by concert lighting, editorial photography, music videos, anime, and Korean dramas. The soundtrack includes original songs by several musicians and a score by Marcelo Zarvos.

The film began streaming on Netflix on June 20, 2025. By the end of the year, it became the most-watched original title in Netflix history, with over 325 million views. A sing-along version had limited theatrical releases on August 23–24 and October 31 – November 2. Its theatrical release was the widest by number of theaters for a Netflix film, and the first to top the box office in the United States. The soundtrack was the first film soundtrack to have four songs in the top ten of the Billboard Hot 100 simultaneously, and was certified double platinum in the US in October 2025.

KPop Demon Hunters received universal acclaim for its animation, visual style, voice acting, story, humor, and music. The recipient of many accolades, it won Best Animated Feature and Best Original Song ("Golden") at both the 83rd Golden Globe Awards and the 98th Academy Awards, and won multiple awards at the 53rd Annie Awards. A sequel is in development.

== Plot ==
Long ago, demons preyed on humans, feeding drained souls to their ruler, Gwi-Ma. In time, three women became demon hunters and used their singing voices to create an effective though incomplete magical barrier against demons called the Honmoon. (Note: Korean: 혼문; Hanja: 魂門; lit. 'spirit gate') As time passed, new trios of hunters emerged to maintain the Honmoon, with the ultimate goal of strengthening it into the promised Golden Honmoon—a final seal that would permanently banish demons.

In the present, the K-pop girl group Huntrix—Rumi, Mira, and Zoey—are the latest demon-hunting trio. Rumi is secretly half-demon, a fact known only to her and former hunter Celine, who raised Rumi. Disquieted by the demonic patterns gradually spreading across her skin, Rumi pushes forward the release and live performance of Huntrix's new single, "Golden", hoping it will turn the Honmoon gold and thereby erase her patterns. However, as they prepare for the performance, Rumi begins to lose her voice.

In the demon world, Gwi-Ma grows enraged at his minions' failures. Led by Jinu, a human-turned-demon, five demons form a boy band, the Saja Boys, to steal Huntrix's fans and weaken the Honmoon, in exchange for Gwi-Ma promising to erase Jinu's painful human memories. Watching their debut, Huntrix quickly discover the Saja Boys' demonic nature and later attack them. As they fight, Jinu discovers Rumi's patterns, but helps hide them from her bandmates. Meeting privately, he tells her that feelings of shame enslave demons through voices from Gwi-Ma: 400 years prior, Gwi-Ma granted him fame and recognition that helped his family escape poverty, but then condemned him to the demon world; Jinu now lives with guilt over his family's downfall.

The Saja Boys grow more popular, weakening the Honmoon and allowing more demon attacks to occur. With the Idol Awards approaching, Huntrix rush to produce a new song, "Takedown", to expose the Saja Boys. Rumi's discomfort with the song's harsh, demon-hating lyrics strains her relationship with Mira and Zoey. Rumi proposes a plan to Jinu: if he helps Huntrix win the awards and strengthen the Honmoon, he could freely stay in the human world. Later, she tells him her shame about her demon heritage weakened her voice, but talking with him healed it. Jinu says he no longer hears voices, thanks likewise to Rumi, and agrees to sabotage the Saja Boys. Gwi-Ma summons Jinu, reminds him he in fact abandoned his family for a life of wealth and comfort, then threatens to amplify the tormenting voices if he reneges on their deal.

At the Idol Awards, Huntrix perform "Golden", having shelved "Takedown" due to the contention it caused between them. However, impostor demons lure Mira and Zoey away from Rumi, while two other demons impersonate them to trick Rumi into performing "Takedown", during which they reveal her patterns. She flees the stage and runs into the real Mira and Zoey, who feel betrayed upon learning of her demonic nature and collusion with Jinu. Realizing his betrayal, Rumi confronts Jinu who admits to lying about his past. Gwi-Ma, strengthened by the influx of consumed souls and decaying Honmoon, enters the human world and casts a trance over the public, drawing them to a Saja Boys performance set to feed him more souls. A desperate Rumi meets with Celine and asks her to end her life. Celine refuses and discusses plans to restore the previous status quo. Rumi lashes out at Celine for never fully loving her and repudiates the now-destroyed Honmoon before leaving.

Rumi interrupts the Saja Boys' performance with an improvised song addressing her shame and self-acceptance, breaking Mira and Zoey out of Gwi-Ma's trance. Reunited, Huntrix fight back and free the crowd. A repentant Jinu sacrifices himself to save Rumi from an attack by Gwi-Ma, giving his restored soul to reinforce her; the empowered Huntrix defeat Gwi-Ma and the remaining Saja Boys, resealing the demons and creating a new rainbow Honmoon. No longer ashamed of her patterns, Rumi celebrates with Mira and Zoey. Afterwards, they meet their fans in public.

== Voice cast ==
- Arden Cho as Rumi, the lead vocalist and leader of Huntrix, who wields a saingeom sword in combat. Rumi is the daughter of a demon father and a deceased demon hunter mother.
  - Ejae provides Rumi's singing voice.
  - Rumi Oak as young Rumi.
- May Hong as Mira, the main dancer of Huntrix, who wields a gokdo polearm in combat. She comes from a wealthy background and is considered the black sheep of her family due to her rebellious nature.
  - Audrey Nuna provides Mira's singing voice.
- Ji-young Yoo as Zoey, the main rapper and lyricist of Huntrix, and the group's maknae. She wields shinkal throwing knives in combat. Zoey is Korean American and was raised in Burbank, California.
  - Rei Ami provides Zoey's singing voice.
- Ahn Hyo-seop as Jinu, leader of the Saja Boys and Rumi's love interest. He is accompanied by a blue pet tiger and a six-eyed magpie.
  - Andrew Choi provides Jinu's singing voice.
- Yunjin Kim as Celine, a former demon hunter and K-pop idol who fostered the orphaned Rumi following her mother's death.
  - Lea Salonga provides Celine's singing voice.
- Joel Kim Booster as Romance Saja
  - Samuil Lee provides Romance Saja's singing voice.
- Alan Lee as Mystery Saja
  - Kevin Woo provides Mystery Saja's singing voice.
- SungWon Cho as Abby Saja (Note: Also referred to as Abs Saja)
  - Neckwav provides Abby Saja's singing voice.
- Danny Chung as Baby Saja
- Daniel Dae Kim as Healer Han, an eccentric doctor.
- Ken Jeong as Bobby, the energetic agent and manager of Huntrix.
- Lee Byung-hun as Gwi-Ma, the king of demons, who takes the form of a giant fiery mouth. Lee reprises the role in the Korean dub of the film.

Liza Koshy voices a television host who interviews Huntrix. Maggie Kang, Nathan Schauf, and Charlene Ramos provide additional voices.

== Production ==
=== Development ===
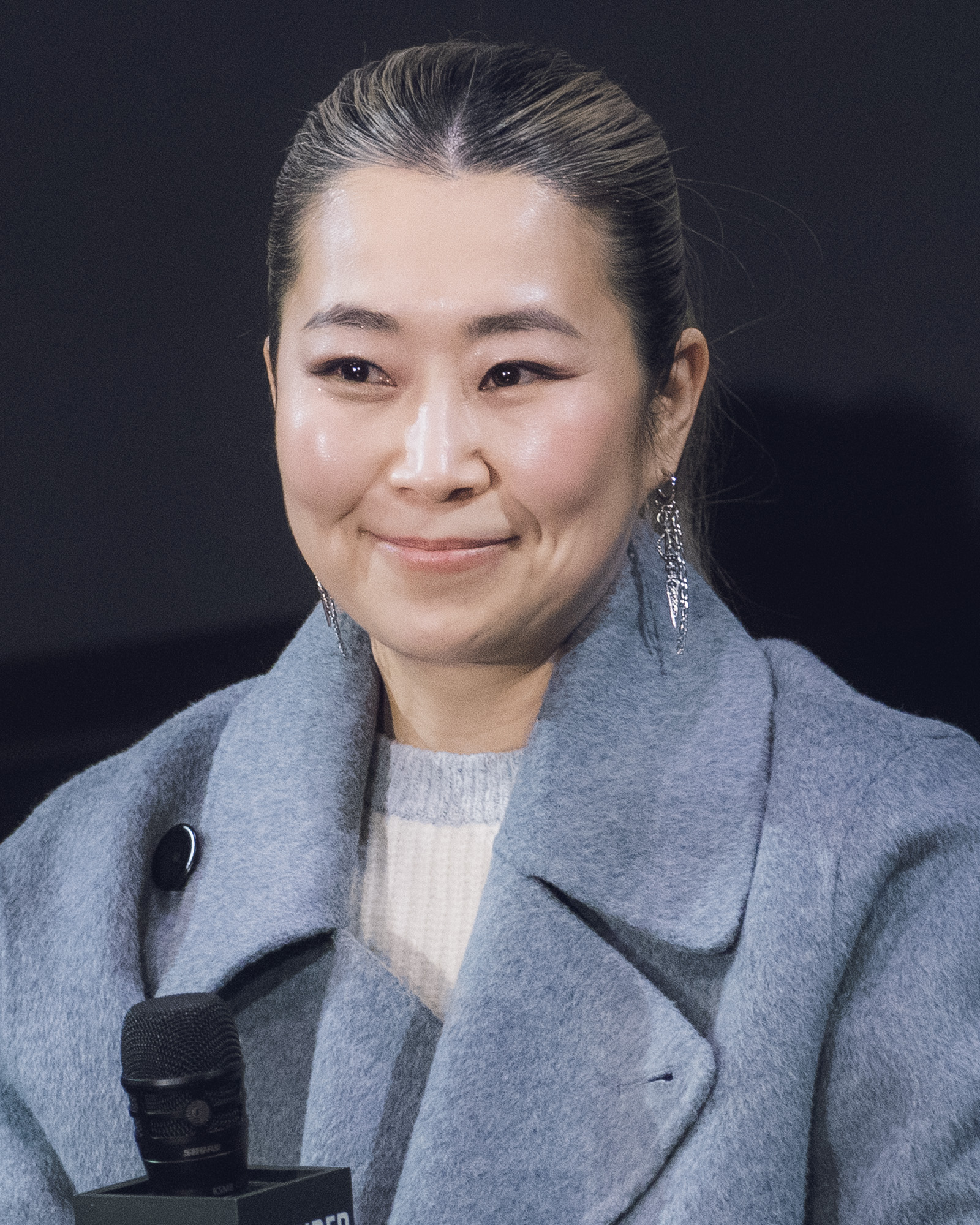
Creator and co-director Maggie Kang in 2026

Director Maggie Kang first pitched the idea that eventually became KPop Demon Hunters to film producer Aron Warner in 2018, during which period he was working on Wish Dragon (2021) for Sony Pictures Animation. Development on the film began that same year, and on March 8, 2021, Sony publicly announced the film, under the working title K-Pop: Demon Hunters. Kang and Chris Appelhans would direct from a script by Hannah McMechan and Danya Jimenez, and Warner and Michelle L. M. Wong would serve as producers. Mingjue Helen Chen and Ami Thompson were announced as production designer and art director, respectively.

To distinguish its visual style from contemporary animated features, Kang based the film on Korean mythology and shamanism. She called the film her "love letter to K-pop" and to her Korean background. Kang explained that when developing the history of the demon hunters, they decided to play into Korean shamanism, and specifically the historical usage of song and dance as part of the rituals of Korean shaman women. On character design, Kang said she wanted to differentiate the main characters from "Marvel female superheroes that were just sexy and cool and badass" and instead combine those elements with "girls who had potbellies and burped and were crass and silly and fun". She was also influenced by the films of Bong Joon Ho, which she said would combine multiple tones in a way that evokes animation. She and Appelhans cited Bong's monster movie The Host (2006) as an inspiration for blending genres and moods. Appelhans had planned to take a long break after directing Wish Dragon, but came on board after Kang told him her initial ideas. He said that he "always wanted to do a film about the power of music—to unite, bring joy, build community". McMechan and Jimenez were approached to write by Nicole Perlman; McMechan told Variety that though the two "had never done animation before, and we didn't know anything about K-pop", they were "exactly what [co-director] Maggie [Kang] had been looking for, with our friendship and us being young girls".

=== Character design ===
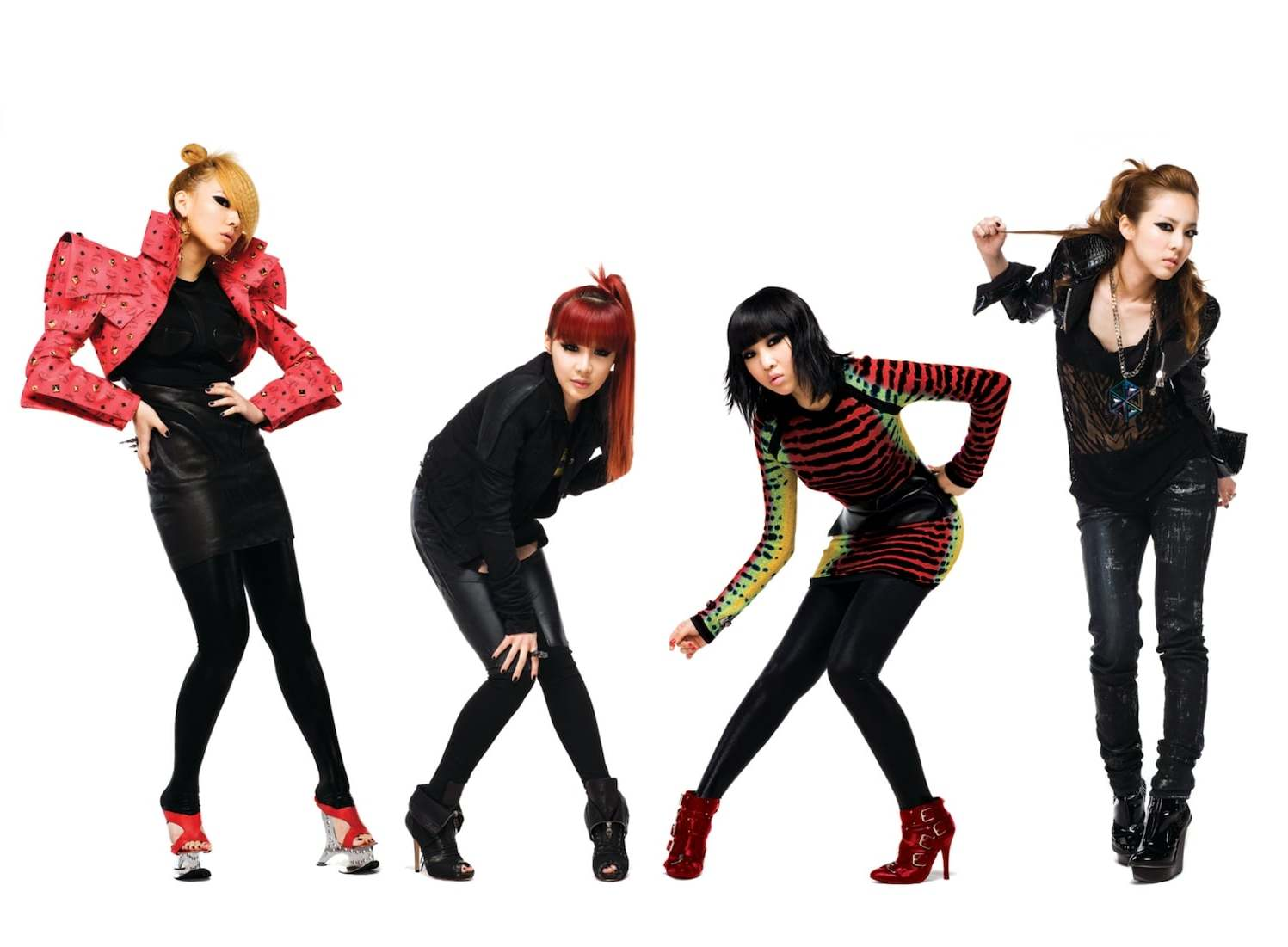
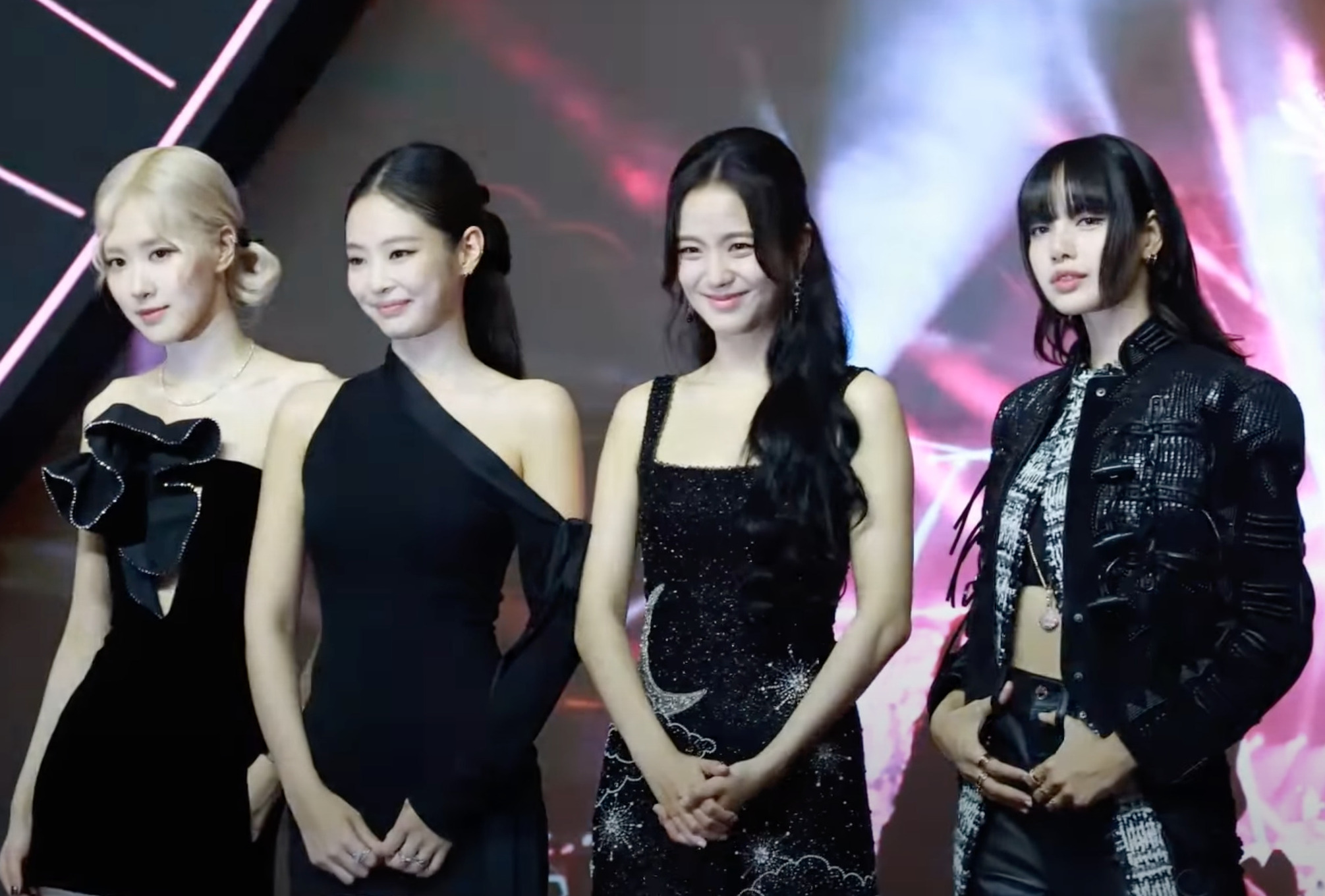
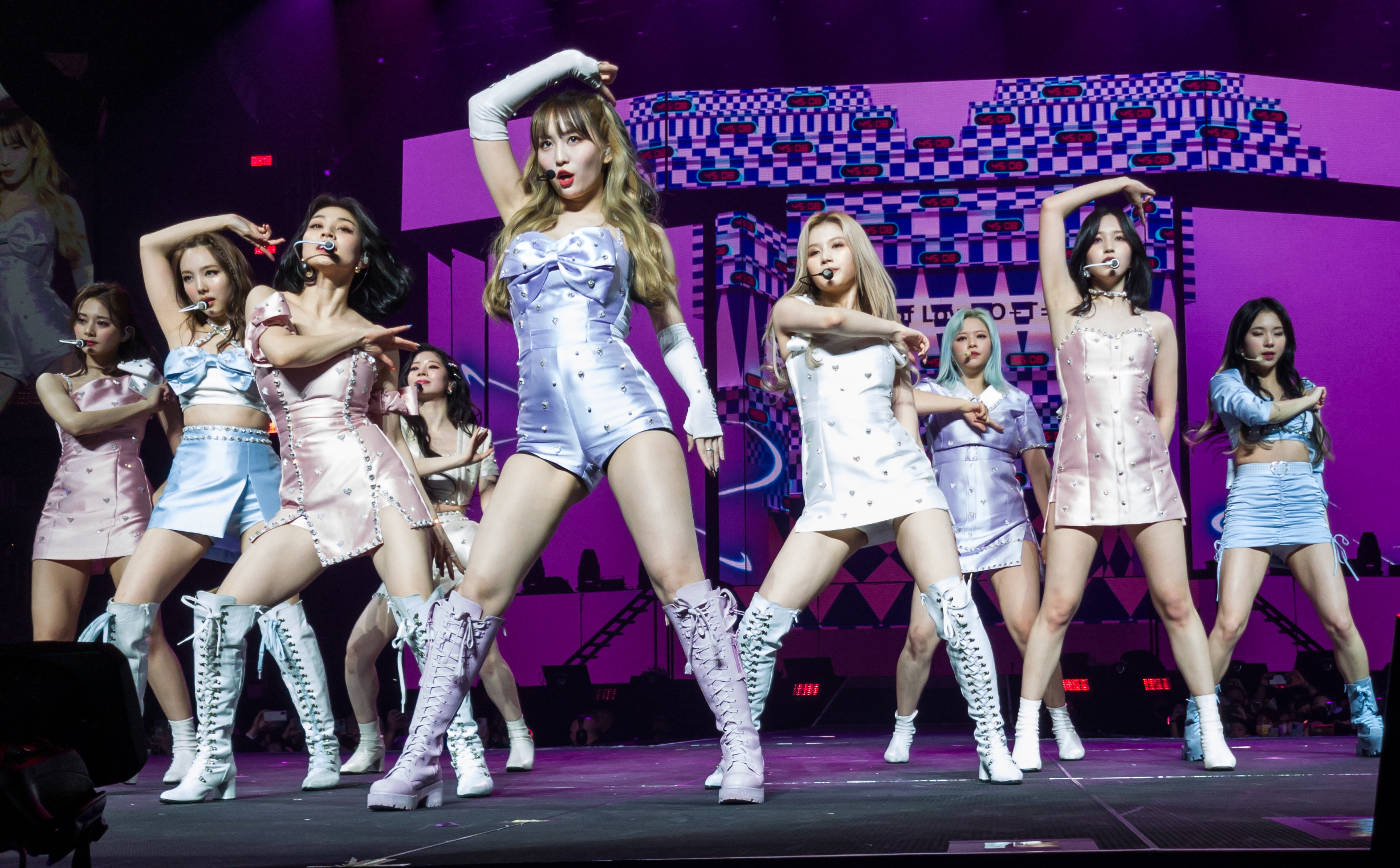
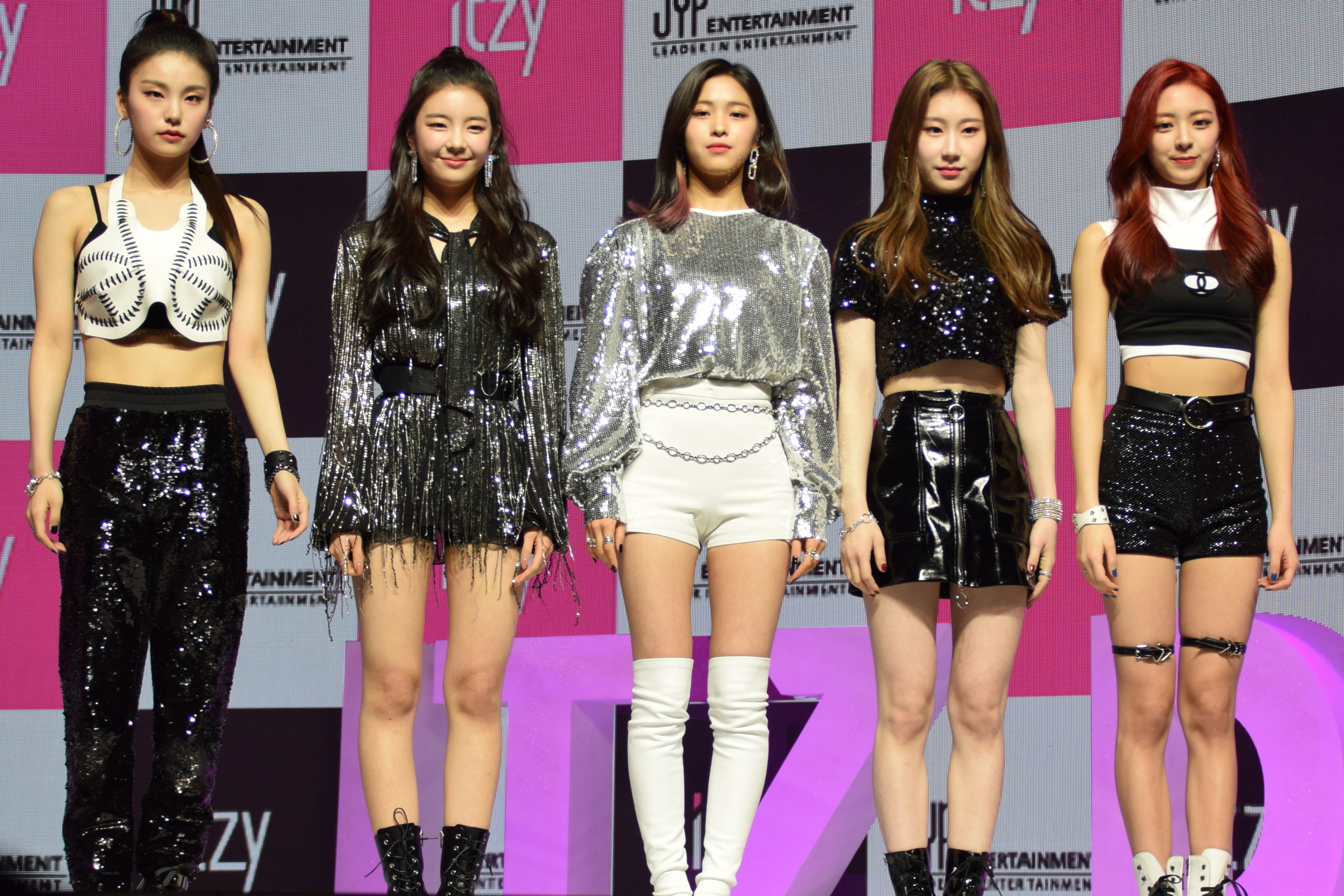
The members of Huntrix were inspired by various K-pop girl groups, including 2NE1, Blackpink, Itzy and Twice (clockwise).

The name Huntrix portmanteaus hunter with the Latin feminine agent noun suffix -trix, to evoke the idea of women warriors. The three members of Huntrix were modeled after K-pop girl groups like Itzy, Blackpink, Twice, and 2NE1. The fashion and makeup of the characters took inspiration from Givenchy, Jean Paul Gaultier, and Alexander McQueen, with a focus on "infusing Korean traditional elements with haute couture". The character of Rumi was created in 2016 by Kang and her husband, Radford Sechrist, for Sechrist's comic Plastic Walrus; Kang repurposed it for KPop Demon Hunters. The character of Mira was inspired by Korean model Ahn So Yeon (professionally known as Ellis Ahn).

The Saja Boys were inspired by Korean boy bands such as Tomorrow X Together, BTS, Stray Kids, Ateez, BigBang, and Monsta X. Korean actor and singer Cha Eun-woo was a key influence for Jinu, the group's leader. Additionally, Kai of the Korean boy band Exo served as a reference for Jinu's facial expressions. The names of the members of the Saja Boys, with the exception of Jinu, reflect K-pop archetypes. The term Saja also alludes to the jeoseung saja (Korean: 저승사자; Hanja: 저승使者), a figure in Korean folklore comparable to the Grim Reaper, and to the Korean word for lion, saja (사자; 獅子); the Saja Boys' logo uses a lion head and the band's fandom is called "the Pride".

Baek Byung-yeul of The Korea Times said the styling of both groups connects to "the past and the present of Korea": the members of Huntrix "wear norigae pendants integrated into modern K-pop fashion, while Saja Boys perform in black hanbok and traditional horsehair hats for their song 'Your Idol,' evoking the image of the jeoseung saja". Huntrix members wield traditional Korean weapons. Max Kim of the Los Angeles Times noted the nods to Korean artists "who are seen today as the progenitors of contemporary K-pop" such as the Jeogori Sisters, The Kim Sisters and S.E.S. Kang described the visual journey in the character design such as the Saja Boys starting in a "bubble gum pop, very saccharine, super sweet look" and shifting darker until they fully take on the appearance of the jeoseung saja. Appelhans said Huntrix's costumes when performing "Golden" symbolize "their kind of MacGuffin of a dream", aspiring for perfection and irreproachability; the tearing away of Rumi's costume at the end of the film's second act represents the disruption of that dream. Appelhans said he wanted the workings of K-pop to be reflected within the film and its plot.

=== Casting ===
Arden Cho, May Hong, and Ji-young Yoo voice Rumi, Mira, and Zoey

The castings for the characters' voice actors and singing voices were done at separate times, with the singers being cast earlier. Ejae was originally brought onto the production as a songwriter, before being offered the role of Rumi's singing voice; in an interview with Genius Korea, Ejae attributed her casting to "the directors [getting] used to hearing [her] voice in the demos". Arden Cho, the voice actress for Rumi, initially auditioned for the role of Celine, then for the role of Rumi at the encouragement of co-director Maggie Kang. Park Jin-young was initially envisioned for the role of Gwi-Ma, because the character was to have a more flamboyant and comedic personality. This was dropped as the character was developed into a more menacing and traditionally antagonistic figure, leading instead to the casting of Lee Byung-hun. In April 2025, Ji-young Yoo was announced as Zoey. The rest of the cast was announced later that month.

=== Animation ===
The film was animated by Sony Pictures Imageworks in its Vancouver and Montreal facilities with Josh Beveridge as animation director. Appelhans said its visual style was inspired by music videos, concert stage lighting, editorial photography, Korean dramas, and anime. Kang said that the team changed its idea after watching Sony's Spider-Verse films, celebrated for their hybrid 2D/3D animation. Instead of blending the two techniques, they focused on a 3D animation style inspired by the "aesthetics and facial expressions of anime". Beveridge similarly noted the inspiration of "2D aesthetics but with three-dimensional language", making the film entirely in 3D CGI, and that it should have a "very bold graphic look". Beveridge said the character art shifts to reflect the tone: glamorous for triumphant moments, angular and line-heavy for aggressive sequences, and "chibi-esque" for comedy. The first major scene to be animated was the initial encounter between Huntrix and the Saja Boys, which Beveridge said acted as a proof of concept for the character designs. Kang sought to authentically represent Korean identity through character animation, focusing on facial features like eye and mouth shapes. Although the characters speak English, the animators designed their mouth shapes to the Korean language. For action scenes, the filmmakers used glitter effects inspired by the South Korean film The Villainess (2017), with Beveridge stating this gave the scenes a feeling of dance-fighting: "You can get pretty violent if you put a lot of glitter on." Precise detail was added to represent Korean cultural details such as the Namsan Tower, Korean cuisine, the Naksan Wall, sign swords, and traditional tiger motifs.

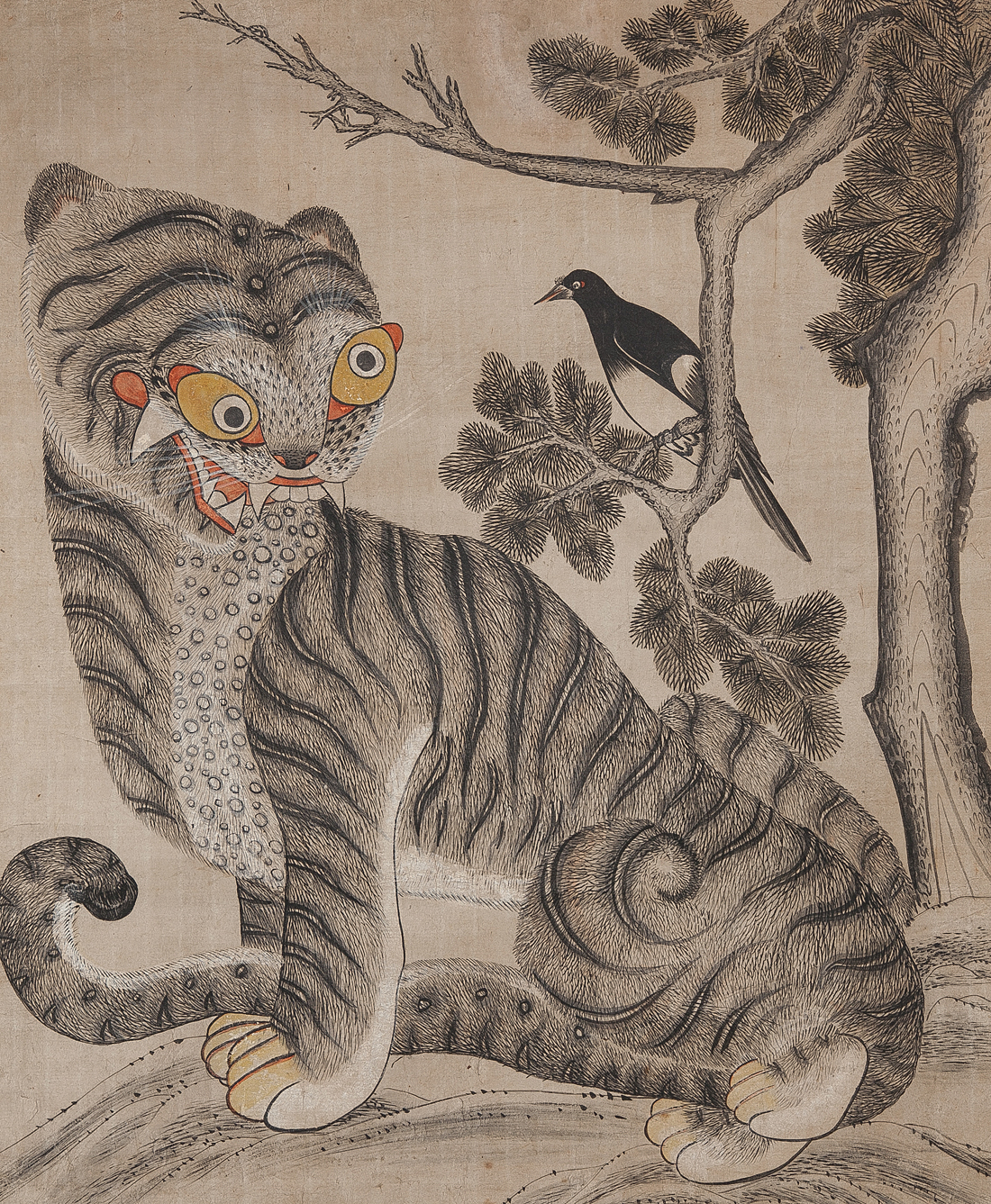
A Korean folk painting of the Tiger and the Magpie

Salon's Hanh Nguyen wrote that the animation of Jinu's pet tiger and magpie—which the creative team calls Derpy and Sussie respectively—are based on minhwa, a type of Korean folk art that was popular during the Joseon period. Images of tigers, magpies, and pine trees are the focus of the Hojak-do genre of minhwa; the portrayal of these animals took cues from the satirical, anti-authority character that Hojak-do took on during the 17th century. Park Han-sol of The Korea Times wrote that minhwa was often "whimsical" with "mischievous details", and depictions of tiger and magpie delivered "a playful jab at those in power". She said the gag of the magpie stealing the tiger's hat "feels like an affectionate nod to the long-running visual joke". Sechrist, acting as a story artist, designed the tiger with bright blue fur to enhance the character's magical feel, a design choice attributed to production designer Helen Mingjue Chen. Kang commented that Derpy was initially conceived without a clear role, but they did not want him to be just a sidekick. The team was inspired by a painting by Chen of a tiger statue turning into a real tiger next to an open-shirt Jinu, which led to the idea of Derpy being Jinu's pet, eventually becoming a means for Rumi and Jinu to exchange messages and communicate, "and then the bird tagged along". Kang said the animals "live between these two worlds", with their nature left mysterious.

=== Choreography ===
The dance choreography was worked on by Jam Republic's Jo Na-In, the Black Label's Leejung Lee, and the group K-Tigers. Jo, a South Korean dancer and choreographer, created the sequences for "Golden" and "Takedown". The choreography for "How It's Done" was done by Lee, and the choreography for "Your Idol" was done by K-Tigers' Ha Seong-jin. Choreography for the "Soda Pop" sequence was worked on by Lee and Ha. In an interview, Jo stated that she was inspired by "Golden" itself when developing the choreography for the song, indicating that "I focused on the storytelling that needed to be conveyed through the animation. I tried to concentrate more on expressing the lyrics and emotions." On the animation aspect, Jo explained that she "made the movements bigger and more expansive" as well as keeping "close attention to details like facial expressions and fingertips to ensure they come across well onscreen".

Fight scene choreography was contributed to by K-Tigers, including Taemin—who acted as the martial arts director—and Ha Seong-jin. When interviewed, Ha explained that he "decided to weave taekwondo elements into [the Saja Boys'] choreography. This way, it could showcase taekwondo not just as a sport, but also as something aesthetically powerful." Josh Beveridge, when discussing the fight choreography, noted the deliberate dance-fighting feel to the action, explaining that "[s]ome of those fight choreographers had done some idol training, and in between the moves, they'd make these cute little adjustments. That is where the personality is."

== Music ==
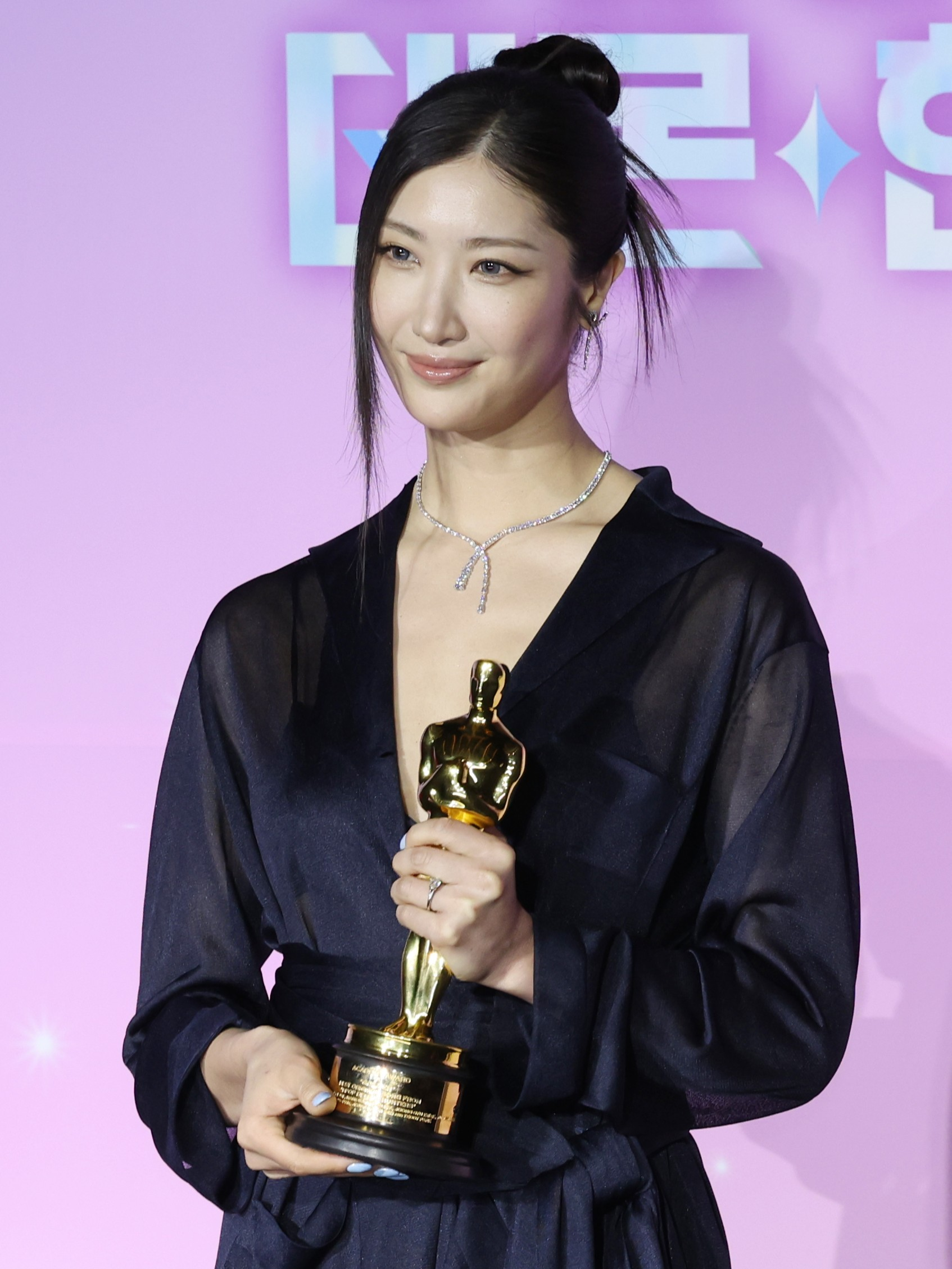
Ejae provides the singing voice of Rumi.

Appelhans said they "wanted the Saja Boys' songs to be super catchy, but slightly hollow, like there's no real soul underneath", unlike the honesty and emotional vulnerability of Huntrix's songs. "The idea was that the surface-level part of your heart might be obsessed with the boys, but the deeper part is moved by the girls." Kang and Appelhans sought the expertise of known K-pop producers to develop the soundtrack. The film's original songs were written by Danny Chung, Ido, Vince, Kush, Ejae, Jenna Andrews, Stephen Kirk, Lindgren, Mark Sonnenblick, and Daniel Rojas; and produced by Teddy Park, 24, Ido, Dominsuk, Andrews, Kirk, Lindgren, and Ian Eisendrath. Marcelo Zarvos composed the score. Agnes Lee, a producer at Sony Pictures Animation, said she specifically sought out Teddy Park of The Black Label after the music of 2NE1 and Blackpink came to mind while reading the script. The soundtrack also features the voices of Ejae, Audrey Nuna, Rei Ami, Andrew Choi, Kevin Woo, samUIL Lee, Neckwav, and Lea Salonga. The soundtrack was released on June 20, 2025; the lead single "Takedown" is performed by Jeongyeon, Jihyo and Chaeyoung of South Korean girl group Twice. The soundtrack was certified platinum by the RIAA on October 8, 2025, with sales exceeding 1 million units.

In the United States, the KPop Demon Hunters soundtrack earned the highest debut on the Billboard 200 for a soundtrack released in 2025, entering at number eight. It was also the first soundtrack of the year to reach the top ten. The album is also the highest-charting animated film's soundtrack album on the chart since Metro Boomin's Spider-Man: Across the Spider-Verse (2023) at number seven, as well as the first Netflix soundtrack to reach number one on the Top Soundtracks since Stranger Things: Soundtrack from the Netflix Series, Season 4 (2022). The BBC highlighted that Huntrix and the Saja Boys—with "Golden" and "Your Idol" respectively—topped the US Spotify chart, with Huntrix and the Saja Boys becoming the highest-charting female and male K-pop groups in the history of the US Spotify daily chart, surpassing Blackpink and BTS, respectively. While not the first fictional K-pop acts to achieve viral success, the Saja Boys and Huntrix garnered attention from outlets like Entertainment Weekly for charting popularity comparable to real-world artists. "Golden", the album's second single, eventually reached number one on the Billboard Global 200, became the longest-lasting number one song by a fictional act on the US Billboard Hot 100, and in South Korea became the third song in 2025 to achieve a perfect all-kill on the charts, as well as breaking the record for the most hourly perfect all-kills of all time. Additionally, the soundtrack became the first in the history of the Billboard Hot 100 to feature four of its songs in the top ten simultaneously; "Golden", "Your Idol", "Soda Pop", and "How It's Done". It is the first film soundtrack since Waiting to Exhale (1995) to feature at least three of its songs in the top 10. Covers of the songs from the soundtrack, especially "Golden", have been pervasive in popular culture, and "Golden" was featured in the final episode of The Kelly Clarkson Show which aired on August 31, 2026.

== Themes ==
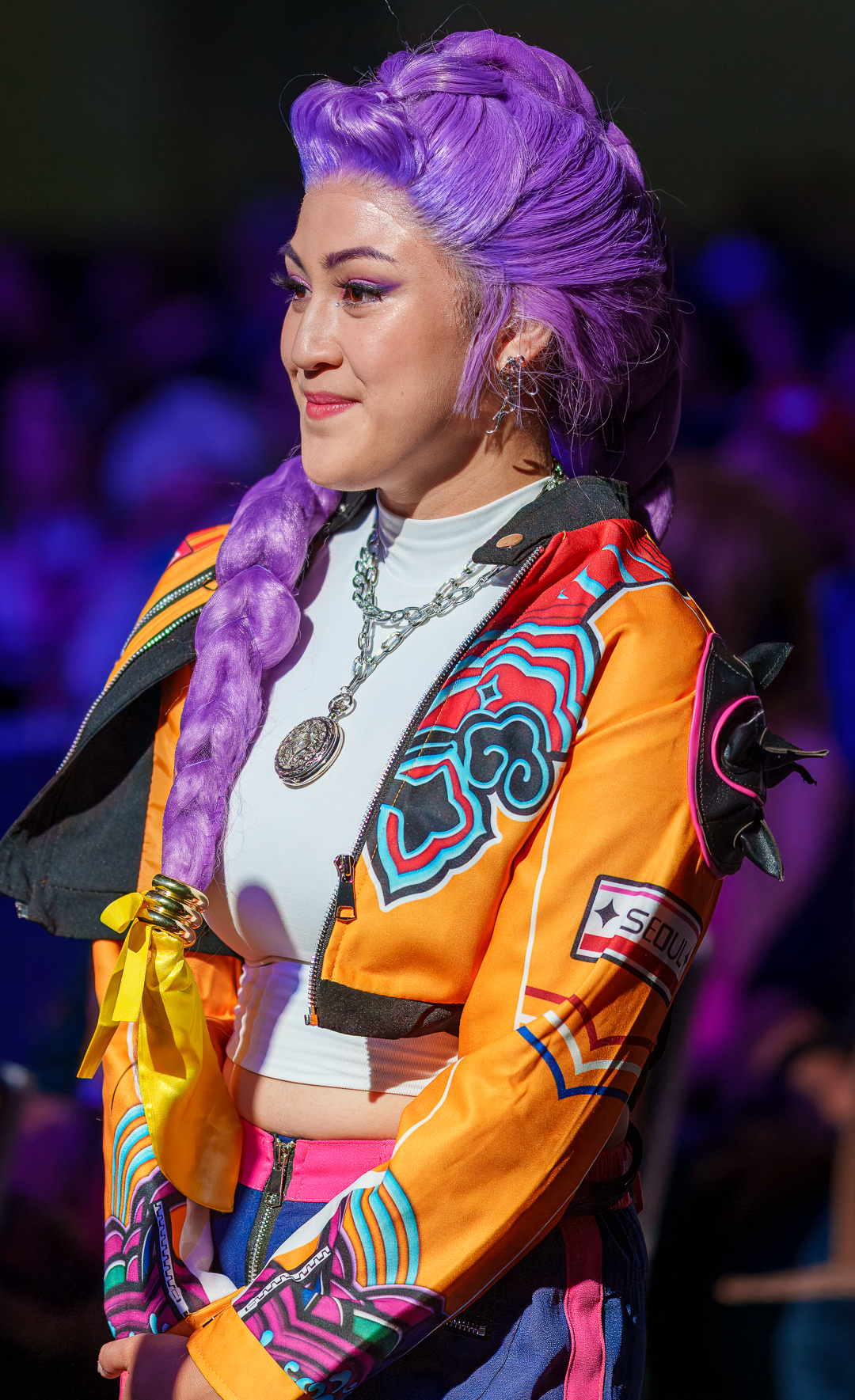
Cosplayer dressed as Rumi

The film's plot explores the power of community and friendship in overcoming cultural pressures. Arden Cho, who voices Rumi, said, "Without Mira and Zoey, she wouldn't have made it." According to the filmmakers, Rumi's arc parallels the experience of coming out, especially in terms of parental and societal expectations. Co-director Maggie Kang noted that the character's journey was deliberately written to mirror the process of revealing one's true self: "Rumi's story [is] like she's coming out of the closet and coming clean to her parents who [want] her to be something that she's not." Kang commented that when developing Rumi's story they "talked a lot about mixed heritage" as well as "queer identity, and addiction and falling back into addiction. We kind of described the demon part of you" where someone is hiding part of themselves from others.

Stephen Thompson of NPR and Taylor Henderson of Out magazine both similarly noted aspects of queer coding and queer allegory within Rumi's story, with Henderson writing that "[w]hile there aren't explicitly LGBTQ+ characters in the film, Rumi's struggle feels quite queer-coded. From an early age, [Celine] instructed her to hide that part of herself from the world. The hiding grew into a deep shame, and she holds contempt for the half-demon part of herself." Sulman Aziz Mirza of Psychiatric News highlighted the focus on "shame, identity, and healing"—in particular, Rumi hiding her demonic heritage and patterns "isolates Rumi in shame, forcing her to skip bonding rituals like bathhouse visits and ultimately silencing her voice". However, "Rumi and Jinu, both burdened by shame, begin to heal through music." Mirza called shame a universal experience so "Rumi's patterns could symbolize anything: depression, queerness, trauma, neurodivergence, or being biracial."

Writing for The Korean Herald, academic Kim Seong-kon identified the three main themes as: "1. The world is not simply made of good and evil, or angels and demons. 2. Do not be ashamed of differences. 3. Hybridity is a strength, not a weakness." Academics Putu Marvitta Adira Prastiwi and Nissa Puspitaning Adni elaborate on themes of gender equality and female empowerment, writing "[t]he solidarity and emotional support among the Huntrix members form[s] a crucial foundation for building an autonomous and empowering female community, while simultaneously critiquing patriarchal pressures that demanded women hide their imperfections and vulnerabilities. Rumi's internal conflict and rejection of the demand to conceal her true self emphasize[s] the necessity of dismantling oppressive symbolic systems so that women could express themselves fully and authentically."

== Release ==
Sony Pictures Animation announced KPop Demon Hunters in March 2021 without a release timetable. In April 2022, it was first reported that Netflix registered a filing for the film. The film was confirmed to be coming to Netflix in February 2023 in a Business Insider interview with Sony Pictures film CEO Tom Rothman. The release of KPop Demon Hunters on Netflix was the result of a 2021 agreement between Netflix and Sony. According to Matthew Belloni of Puck, this agreement entailed Sony giving Netflix "a first look at certain live-action and animated film projects", with Netflix in turn guaranteeing to greenlight a certain number of projects for joint development, which it would release and have control over. Under the terms of this deal, Netflix paid Sony $125 million to cover both the budget for KPop Demon Hunters and a premium worth 25% of the budget; in exchange, Netflix would maintain all film rights, and would not need to pay any profit participation.

In June 2024, Netflix announced that KPop Demon Hunters, a film produced by Sony Pictures Animation, would be released in 2025. In April 2025, the film was confirmed for a June 20 release. In addition to streaming on Netflix, KPop Demon Hunters had a limited theatrical release at select cinemas in California and New York from June 20–26. A sing-along version of the film was released theatrically in select theaters in North America, the UK, Australia, and New Zealand from August 23–24, 2025. The sing-along version was subsequently released on Netflix, separately from the original version. The film then had a second theatrical sing-along release from October 31 – November 2.

The June 2025 theatrical release in the United States was enough to satisfy the eligibility requirements for the Best Animated Film and Best Original Song categories at the Oscars. The subsequent international theatrical releases did not meet the requirements to qualify for the BAFTA Awards, due to the British theatrical run occurring two months after the streaming release, along with not having enough commercial screenings. The British Academy rejected Netflix's exception appeal; according to Deadline, KPop Demon Hunters would have qualified if Netflix were to have given the film a simultaneous release in British cinemas and on streaming.

=== Home media ===
The film was released on a 2-disc version on DVD and Blu-ray, and on a 3-disc version on 4K Ultra HD on November 3, 2026, as part of the Criterion Collection with special features. The release of the home-media version of the film is based on a new 4K version of the master, while the special features on Disc 2 include new interviews with Kang and Appelhans, a 95-minute storyboard animatic preliminary version of the film, and other documentary essays on the film. On November 8, 2026, a special release event for the Criterion edition release is scheduled at The Grove at Farmers Market in Los Angeles with directors Maggie Kang and Chris Appelhans in attendance among others from the production staff.

== Reception ==
=== Viewership ===
On July 29, 2025, Netflix announced that KPop Demon Hunters had become the platform's "most watched original animated film of all time". On August 26, Netflix said it had been watched 236 million times, passing Red Notice (2021) as its most-watched film. In late August, The Hollywood Reporter cited Netflix data showing the film's steady performance throughout the summer. On September 3, Netflix stated it had passed 266 million views, overtaking the first season of Squid Game (2021) to become Netflix's most-watched title; by 91 days after its release (the cutoff used by Netflix for recording official viewership), KPop Demon Hunters reached 325.1 million views. As of December 24, it had received more that 500 million views. Nielsen Media Research, which records streaming viewership on certain US television screens, reported that KPop Demon Hunters garnered 20.5 billion minutes of watch time in 2025, ranking as the most-streamed film of the year.

=== Box office ===
The sing-along version of KPop Demon Hunters was released in theaters on August 23, 2025. It debuted in 1,700 theaters, dethroning the 698-theatre release of Netflix's Glass Onion: A Knives Out Mystery (2022). It was initially projected to gross $18 million to $20 million during its opening weekend. It was the company's best-performing theatrical release, beating out Glass Onion ($13.1 million in 2022). It was the first Netflix film to finish in first place over the weekend. Netflix did not report grosses. In the United States and Canada, KPop Demon Hunters made $19.2 million, ahead of Weapons, which was expected to remain in first during its third weekend.

Jeremy Fuster of TheWrap wrote that its theatrical release was set to open higher than the three-day opening weekends of The Bad Guys 2 ($22 million) and Elio ($20.8 million); he said it would have made $100 million domestically had it not first been streamed. Matt Schimkowitz of The A.V. Club wrote that the theatrical release drew many moviegoers who had likely streamed it. Ben Fritz of The Wall Street Journal noted that the acclaim led Netflix to make it a rare theatrical release. Matthew Belloni of Puck noted that, due to the arrangement between Netflix and Sony for the production, most of the profit, including from any potentially subsequent franchise, would be accrued by Netflix, the distributor, rather than by Sony. For Netflix's film chief Dan Lin, "this is a studio chairman's dream: a relatively cheap superhit" with evident avenues for exploitation across multiple businesses being available, whereas Sony's film chief Tom Rothman "gotta be kicking himself over this one".

=== Critical response ===
KPop Demon Hunters received wide acclaim from both critics and audiences, who praised its animation, music, voice acting, and story. On the review aggregator website Rotten Tomatoes, 92% of 107 critics' reviews are positive, with an average rating of 7.7/10. The website's consensus reads: "Animated with infectious energy and vibrant colors, KPop Demon Hunters is jaunty family entertainment with a terrific soundtrack to boot." Metacritic, which uses a weighted average, assigned the film a score of 77 out of 100, based on 10 critics, indicating "generally favorable" reviews.

Brandon Yu, for The New York Times, wrote that KPop Demon Hunters "is an original universe that is charming, funny and artfully punchy". Yu said it shared the same cinematic approach as the Spider-Verse animated films, also produced by Sony Pictures Animation, noting both as featuring effective usages of fluid action, striking art, and music that serves the storytelling. Toussaint Egan of IGN similarly compared KPop Demon Hunters to Spider-Verse, while also highlighting the fight sequences, which he described as having "flashy choreography and anime-inflected verve". Brian Tallerico of RogerEbert.com considered the visuals and artwork to be essential parts of the film's success, saying that they elevate storytelling and themes. Jeff Ewing of Collider, while praising the animation and catchiness of the songs, gave attention the strength of the voice cast, in particular the performances of Cho, Hong, Yoo, and Ahn. Bill Goodykoontz of The Arizona Republic praised the film for both its genre-hopping tone and its family-friendliness. Kelechi Ehenulo of Empire described the film as "a cross between Buffy the Vampire Slayer and Popstars: The Rivals", praising the watchability, comedy, and story about shame, generationally-imposed emotional burdens, and embracing who you are. Kevin Maher of The Times, while describing the film as a "dazzling blast of kitsch ephemera" appearing on its surface as "a high-concept fever dream", focussed praise on how the themes of shame, anxiety, and mental health in both Rumi's story and the song "Golden" were able to resonate with the film's audience.

Matt Goldberg of TheWrap commented that the plot would "be painfully overwrought" were it not for the comedy. Goldberg and Yu felt its best comedy came from poking fun at the culture and tropes surrounding K-pop, K-dramas, and other K-media. David Tizzard of The Korea Times said KPop Demon Hunters was both "a love letter to K-pop", and an unflinchingly critical examination of K-pop culture. He also praised the representation of Korean culture, stating that it captures and displays aspects of everyday life in South Korea "with an intimacy rarely seen in global content." Tizzard and Peter Debruge of Variety both highlighted the usage of the magpie and tiger, which Tizzard noted as being affectionately reinterpreted from Korean tradition.

Isaiah Colbert of Io9 praised the authentic musicality, such that even those watchers who are not fans of K-pop "would find themselves bobbing their head and humming along". Debruge commented that because of the setting and immersion within the world of K-pop, the audience might not fully recognize the film is a musical. Wilson Chapman of IndieWire thought the most impressive aspect of the music was the varied ways in which the songs are staged, such as a demon fight for "How It's Done", an opulent music video for "Golden", a creation montage for "Takedown", and an energetic dance number for "Soda Pop". Chapman considered this variation and versatility of the staging to be the means through which the K-pop elements are "a central and vital component of its storytelling", rather than a gimmick. Similarly, Tizzard, Goldberg, and Goodykoontz all noted the integration of the music and narrative, with Tizzard commenting that the songs "aren't throwaway jingles; they're emotional climaxes", Goldberg that the songs, while catchy, have plot stakes that serve to maintain tension, and Goodykoontz that the songs "don't just serve the story, but drive it."

Angela Garcia of SLUG wrote that due to the short runtime, KPop Demon Hunters "[feels] like it's only scratched the surface of both the world and characters", with many ideas having been left underdeveloped. Chapman also highlighted the short runtime, which he felt was both a benefit and the main flaw; by moving quickly, the film lacks depth at points, such as Mira and Zoey not receiving enough story focus, or not fully exploring Rumi's resentment towards Celine, and results in a rushed, underwhelming climax that provides an overly easy resolution. Goldberg also noted an occasional tonal whiplash, and argued that stronger character arcs were needed for Zoey and Mira leading into the climax to bridge the divide between the comic relief and its more emotional moments. Tallerico felt that the film works best when it moves at a speedy pace, considering its slower moments to be comparatively weaker and repetitive. Tallerico attributed this to the film "ha[ving] too many characters over-explain[ing] their emotional crutches and what they need to do to overcome them", and further argued that the film should have relied less on dialogue and more heavily on music and visuals for storytelling. Though Ehenulo found some aspects predictable and rushed, he nonetheless stated that the film deserved its success, praising its energy, music, and themes.

=== Accolades ===
KPop Demon Hunters garnered various awards, nominations, and accolades. It won Best Animated Feature at the 31st Critics' Choice Awards, the 83rd Golden Globe Awards, and the 98th Academy Awards, along with being featured in Time as its 2025 Breakthrough of the Year. The film also won ten awards at the 53rd Annie Awards, including for Best Feature. The song "Golden", from the soundtrack, won Best Original Song at the Critics' Choice Awards, Golden Globes, and Academy Awards. The song won Best Song Written for Visual Media at the 68th Grammy Awards, and won Best OST at the 2025 Melon Music Awards and 2025 MAMA Awards; the song is the first K-pop song to win a Grammy Award or an Academy Award. Ejae, Audrey Nuna, and Rei Ami were honored at the 2026 Billboard Women in Music for their work as the singing voices of Huntrix; this marked the first time a group had been collectively awarded.

== Cultural impact ==
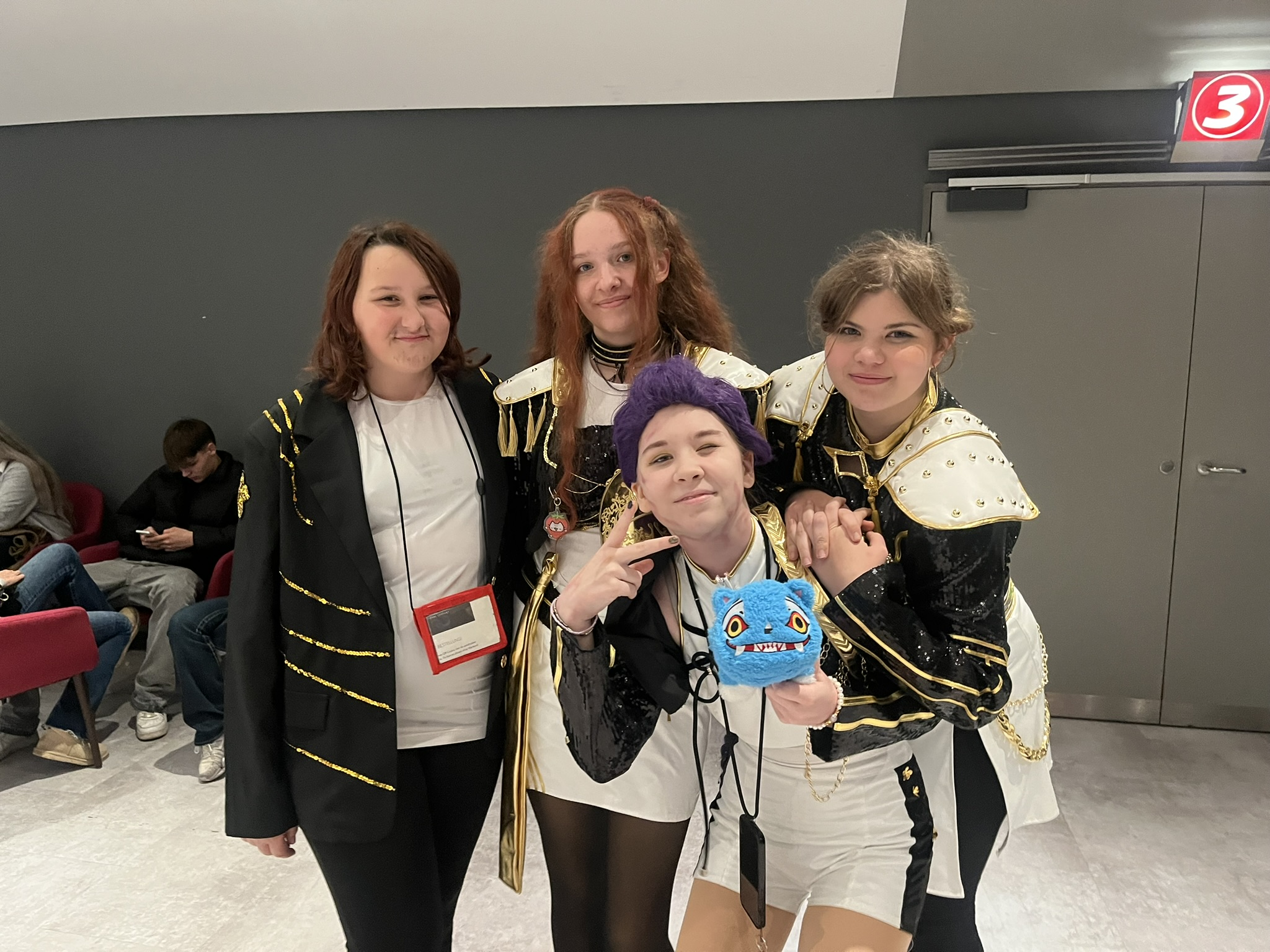
Attendees of a theatrical sing-along screening, cosplaying as the film's characters

KPop Demon Hunters furthered the visibility and popularity of South Korean culture as part of the Korean Wave and inspired an expansive fandom. The film's popularity has been described as surprising and unexpected; its streaming success was compared by Nate Jones of Vulture to that of Disney's Encanto (2021). Drew Taylor of TheWrap described it as a widespread phenomenon, citing the popularity of the soundtrack album, and Netflix's official shop adding a KPop Demon Hunters section, with T-shirts and plushies being among top five best-selling items of 2025. Others called the film an "animated sensation", a "potential gold mine" for Netflix, a "smash hit movie", and the "biggest hit of Hollywood's summer". The Cut said the characters, storyline, and soundtrack as reasons for its popularity, with Yoohyun Jung of The Boston Globe suggesting that integration of Korean culture into the story was another reason for why it is popular.

In late September, Luminate made a presentation at the All That Matters conference in Singapore about insights from global and APAC music, saying that multimedia cross-promotion helped the performance, with over two-thirds of audio streams from the soundtrack coming from outside of the United States. Luminate also described the film as a "transmedia hit". Sara Leila Sherman and Morton Sherman wrote in Psychology Today that KPop Demon Hunters became "more than entertainment", with sing-alongs bringing people together. On September 12, Lars Brandle reported on Billboard that the soundtrack made up seven of the top twenty songs on the ARIA Singles Chart, and had led the chart for seven consecutive weeks. Writing for Billboard that day, Thomas Smith noted that "Golden" topped the UK charts for a sixth consecutive week, becoming only the second K-pop song to do so.

The film also made its way into sports and other popular culture. On September 2 at the US Open, Novak Djokovic, after winning a tennis match with Taylor Fritz, did a dance inspired by the song "Soda Pop". The film was also featured in a Saturday Night Live sketch on its season premiere hosted by Bad Bunny, and included cameos from Ejae, Audrey Nuna and Rei Ami performing 30-second snippets from the songs "Golden" and "How It's Done" live, with Bowen Yang portraying the character Jinu and singing lyrics from "Soda Pop". On October 7, Ejae, Nuna and Rei Ami gave a full-length performance of "Golden" during an episode of The Tonight Show Starring Jimmy Fallon, along with being interviewed by the host. The singers repeated a performance of "Golden" during the 99th annual Macy's Thanksgiving Day Parade in New York City on November 27, alongside a balloon themed after Derpy Tiger and a balloonicle themed after Sussie.

=== Korean Wave ===
KPop Demon Hunters has been noted within the context of the Korean Wave, a global increase in popularity of South Korean culture and media that has acted as a form of soft power for the country. Some, like Korean cultural scholar Park Jihyon, said that the popularity could likely become a major turning point in the Korean Wave's history. Researchers such as Xin Fan and Salas Supalakwatchana have commented on the film as "a major cultural product within the Korean soft power landscape", and as a demonstration of the medium of animation as being "capable of merging entertainment value with strategic cultural promotion". Cho Jae-hyon of Hankook Ilbo opined that KPop Demon Hunters represents a new phase of the Korean Wave, in which Korean-themed content would be produced abroad rather than being created within South Korea and then exported. With KPop Demon Hunters, Cho highlighted the production team as largely being non-Korean. Moon Dong-yeol of The Hankyoreh similarly argued that KPop Demon Hunters represents a denationalization of the Korean Wave, not being limited to production solely within South Korea.

Both Cho and Min Seong-jae of The Korea Times have highlighted this new phase of the Korean Wave as being influenced by Korean diaspora creators, with Cho noting that "Maggie Kang, a Korean Canadian, drew on her childhood memories of K-content to create the film." Grace Kao, for Foreign Policy, similarly noted the presence of many Korean diaspora songwriters and artists as part of the making of KPop Demon Hunters, and compared this to the indebtedness of K-pop to diaspora Koreans participating in music industries of the United States, Canada, and Australia. Kao additionally characterized KPop Demon Hunters as a rebuke of a localization trend within K-pop, where local cultural elements are emphasized over strictly Korean ones. She said it "shows that consumers are not looking for a product stripped of Korean cultural elements or Koreans themselves" and that it is not necessary for media to emulate American pop culture to achieve success.

Michelle Yee Hee Lee of The Washington Post wrote that KPop Demon Hunters had been overwhelmingly embraced by South Korea, even by businesses and government, due to its broad appeal as an animated film, with products and events based around the film. Hae-rin Lee of The Korea Times said the global popularity boosted tourism in South Korea, with fans interested in South Korea pop culture visiting recording studios, museum shops, cafés, and other attractions, including locations shown in the film, such as Namsan, Naksan Park Fortress Trail, and Bukchon Hanok Village. Some businesses have released products related to the film, while fans are said to be embracing the food the main characters are shown eating. The National Museum of Korea in Seoul drew more than five million visitors, an unprecedented total that ranks it alongside the Metropolitan Museum of Art in New York City and the British Museum in London. This surge was partly credited to the widespread popularity of KPop Demon Hunters. Seoul's Leeum Museum of Art opened an exhibition focused on tiger and magpie minhwa, including a Hojak-do painting from 1592 which is considered the oldest surviving piece in this style. Sookyung Seo of The Korea Economic Daily wrote that, partially due to the film's popularity, over 1.36 million international tourists were drawn to Seoul in July 2025, an increase of 23.1% from the same month in 2024, and of 18% from July 2019, according to the Seoul Metropolitan Government's data, and said to be the "largest monthly tally ever recorded".

=== Fandom ===
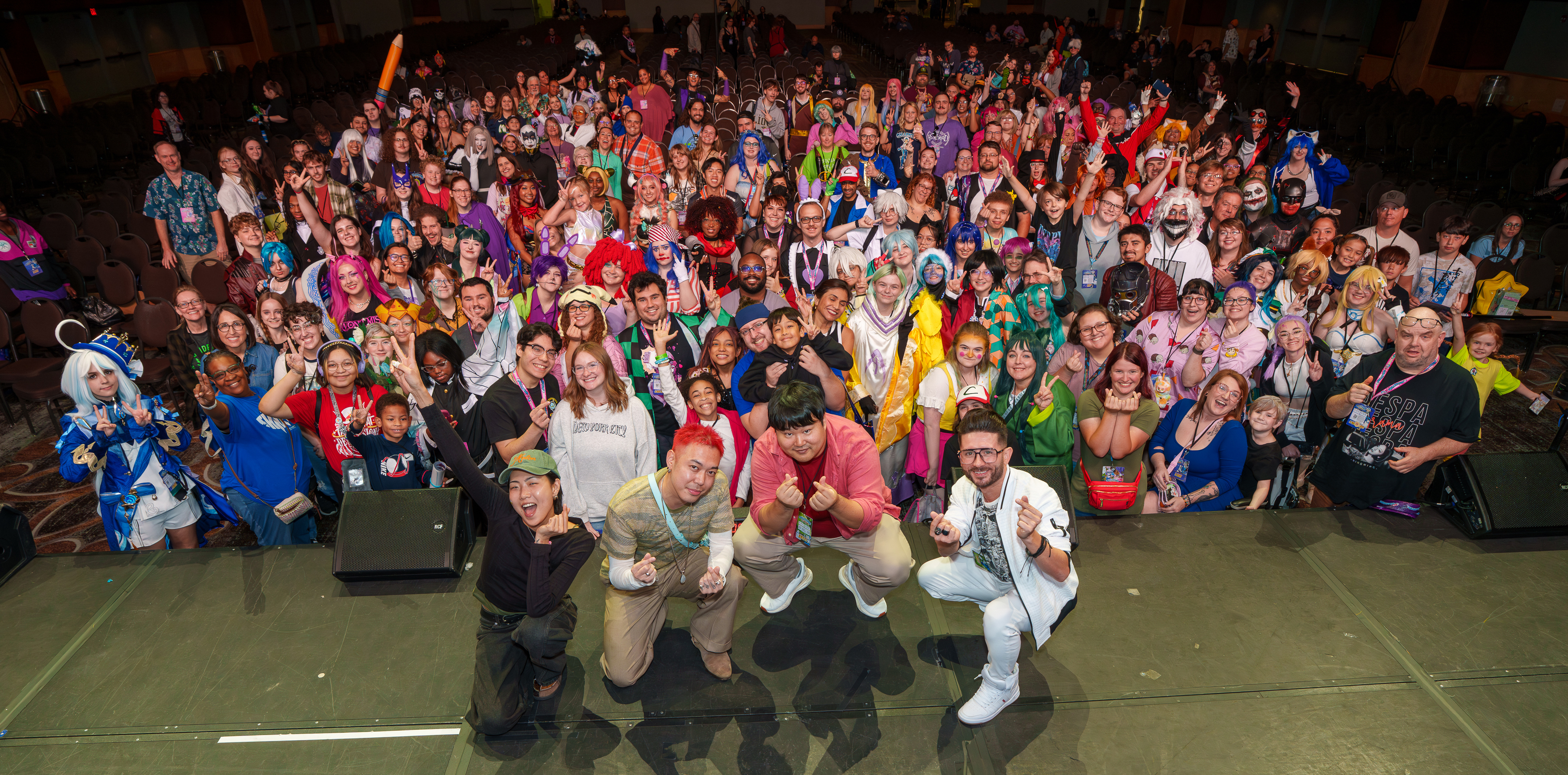
May Hong, Danny Chung, Alan Lee, the stage host, and fans at GalaxyCon in St. Louis, Missouri on October 11, 2025

KPop Demon Hunters has been noted as a cultural phenomenon by a variety of media outlets, many highlighting the soundtrack, characters, and story, as well as homages to anime and representation of fandom and Asian cultures. Others noted that dance sequences had become popular on the social media platform TikTok, and that fanart had flooded other social media websites. Within South Korea, fans called the fandom "KeDeHun". The film's success was also seen as a success for its representation of Asian characters in pop culture, with children not having to look to "Pixar or Disney princesses for costume inspiration".

BBC News reported on dance classes themed on K-pop, particularly songs from the film, in Belfast, and said that K-pop has gained increased visibility. Alex Vadukul of The New York Times noted that an intense fandom had formed around Huntrix and the Saja Boys, and noted that May Hong, who voices Mira, said it was "crazy being on the receiving end of [the film's] fandom." Yvonne Kim of The Atlantic said that KPop Demon Hunters transforms fandom "from a hobby into an action of creation". She added that it acknowledges the "sometimes-parasitic relationship between artist and listener" and the "unilateral power" of performers, and said that the fans are not different from their real-life counterparts.

There has been an internet challenge involving ramen noodles, based on ramyun eaten by Rumi, Zoey, and Mira, while singing the song "How It's Done". It was reported that this resulted in severe burns and hospitalization among some fans who tried to recreate this scene, with doctors and hospitals warning about the dangers of eating instant noodles in extremely hot water, suggesting people eat the noodles more carefully. During the 2025 Halloween season, KPop Demon Hunters-related costumes saw significant popularity, with Google searches for costumes of the characters dominating search rankings, and with costumes from major retailers like Spirit Halloween quickly becoming sold out. Local news media from across the United States similarly noted the high popularity of KPop Demon Hunters costumes.

== Future ==
=== Sequel ===
In interviews with Screen Rant and Variety, director Maggie Kang expressed interest in a sequel and side stories to flesh out the KPop Demon Hunters universe. She said that many questions that were raised remain unanswered fully, with additional stories capable of being explored, such as potential backstories for Mira and Zoey. Director Chris Appelhans likewise told People that there were many pathways available for further stories. Matthew Belloni of Puck noted that, under the 2021 agreement between Sony and Netflix, Sony contractually holds the right to produce future installments of KPop Demon Hunters; however, any such installments would likely, just as for the first film, be released for streaming onto Netflix.

In July 2025, TheWrap reported that, following the success, Netflix had begun considering several potential follow-up projects, including two sequels, a television series, a short film, and a stage musical. In a statement to Newsweek, Netflix Films chairman Dan Lin commented that the company was "excited to explore what could be the next adventure for Huntrix", while further stating that time would need to be taken for producing any future sequels, in order to ensure that the "flair and uniqueness" of the original film is retained. In August 2025, Belloni reported that Sony had just begun negotiations with Kang and Appelhans to both return for a follow-up project. On August 26, Pamela McClintock of The Hollywood Reporter stated that Sony Pictures and Netflix were in talks for the production of an animated sequel. On November 5, 2025, it was announced that a sequel was planned for release in 2029. However, in February 2026, Sony Pictures Animation president Kristine Belson suggested that the sequel would likely not be finished by 2029. In March 2026, Kang and Appelhans were announced to be returning to write and direct. In the following month, Kang stated that the sequel is planned to be larger in scale and more eventful than its predecessor, while Ejae showed interest in exploring trot and heavy metal in the planned film. In September 2026, Netflix co-CEO Ted Sarandos confirmed that the film would receive a broad theatrical release.

=== Short film ===
On March 29, 2023, Sony announced that their LENS mentorship program would produce a short film based on KPop Demon Hunters after the release of the Spider-Verse short film The Spider Within. In September 2025, the film, Debut: A KPop Demon Hunters Story, was rated PG by the MPA.

=== Other media ===
Rumi, Mira, and Zoey were added to the video game Fortnite as purchasable outfits on October 2, 2025, alongside a KPop Demon Hunters-themed limited time mode and items. On February 5, 2026, a second wave of Fortnite cosmetics were revealed, including Huntrix in their outfits from Golden and a Jinu skin. In October 2025, it was announced that Netflix granted the global KPop Demon Hunters master toy licenses to both Hasbro and Mattel, with toys scheduled to be sold at retail beginning in 2026. On November 28, a digital artbook was released online; a physical edition was published in February 2026. To coincide with Spotify Wrapped for 2025, a brief animated video was released of Huntrix thanking their real-life fans for listening to "Golden". In February 2026, it was announced that a graphic novel adaptation of the film was scheduled for release in March 2026. Between April 2026 and May 2026, the video game Cookie Run: Kingdom ran a collaboration update based on the film. Mira, Rumi, Zoey, Jinu, Derpy and Sussie are available as playable characters in the Netflix Games version of Overcooked.

On October 26, 2026, Netflix released an animated choreography video, featuring Rumi, Mira, and Zoey, for the song "How It's Done". Netflix also released a series showing the choreography of the film's other songs; it features the film's original choreographers Nain, Leejung Lee, and K-Tigers.

=== Tour ===
On May 13, 2026, Netflix announced a partnership with AEG Presents to launch a global KPop Demon Hunters concert tour. In November 2026, they announced the Golden World Tour with its US leg scheduled to run from June 5 to August 14, 2027, followed by its European leg scheduled to run from September 1 to October 23, 2027. As of November 13, 2026, dates for other regions have not yet been announced; however, Variety reported the tour plans "to reach close to 50 cities and stage more than 150 shows" from 2027 to 2028. The tour will feature animated performances by Huntrix as well as live-action performers, stunts and dance routines; other characters from the film will appear such as the Saja Boys and Derpy Tiger.
