= May Hong =

South Korean and American model and actress (born 1988)

- Hong in 2026
- Born: October 24, 1988 (age 38); Seoul, South Korea
- Education: Rhode Island School of Design (BFA)
- Occupations: Model; actress; artist
- Years active: 2011–present
- Modeling information
- Height: 5 ft 10 in (178 cm)
- Hair color: Black
- Eye color: Brown

May Hong (Korean: 메이 홍; born October 24, 1988) is a South Korean and American model, actress, and artist. She has most notably modeled for designers including Eckhaus Latta, Marc Jacobs, and Gucci. As an actress, Hong has appeared on High Maintenance, Hacks, Tales of the City, and the animated film KPop Demon Hunters.

== Life and career ==
Hong was born in Seoul, South Korea and immigrated to the United States at age six. She was raised in Flushing, Queens, New York. Hong attended high school at Fiorello LaGuardia High School, where she studied art and cultivated an interest in printmaking. She received her bachelor of fine arts degree in printmaking from RISD in 2010.

Hong moved to Brooklyn after graduation and managed a photography studio. Her modeling career began when her friends Mike Eckhaus and Zoe Latta asked her to model for their fledgling brand in 2011. She continued modeling and eventually began to do commercials. She has modeled for designers including Adidas, Marni, Gucci, Telfar, and Marc Jacobs. She has also walked New York Fashion Week. Hong has walked in multiple Eckhaus Latta runway shows.

She has acted in the television shows Broad City, High Maintenance, New Amsterdam, and Hacks, and the film Adam. Her first lead acting role was in the Netflix revival series Tales of the City (2019) as Margot Park. She voiced the character Mira in the Netflix animated film KPop Demon Hunters (2025). The film became Netflix's most watched animated movie of all time by July 2025, and eventually Netflix's most-watched film ever at 236 million views by August, surpassing Red Notice (2021).

== Filmography ==
=== Film ===
Year	Title	Role	Notes
2019	Adam	Kris	
2025	KPop Demon Hunters	Mira (speaking voice)	
TBA	Perfect Girl †	TBA	Filming

=== Television ===
Year	Title	Role	Notes
2017	Broad City	Ilana's Hookup	Episode: "Twaining Day"
2018–19	High Maintenance	Sara	2 episodes
2019	New Amsterdam	Nancy Nan	Episode: "Preventable"
2019	Tales of the City	Margot Park	8 episodes
2022	Hacks	Morgan	Episode: "The Captain's Wife"
2023	Up Here	Steph	2 episodes
2023	Full Circle	Carol	3 episodes
2024	Fantasmas	Alex, Bartender	2 episodes
2026	Not Suitable for Work	Jocelyn	8 episodes

== Awards and nominations ==
Award	Year	Category	Work	Result	Ref.
Nickelodeon Kids' Choice Awards	2026	Favorite On-Screen Duo/Trio (Note: with Arden Cho, Ji-young Yoo)	KPop Demon Hunters	Nominated	
North Carolina Film Critics Association	2026	Best Voice Performance In Animation or Mixed Media	KPop Demon Hunters	Nominated	

=== Listicles ===
Name of publisher, year listed, name of listicle, and placement
Publisher	Year	Listicle	Placement	Ref.
Forbes	2025	100 Most Powerful Women (Note: with The female creators and cast of the Netflix animated film KPop Demon Hunters)	100th	
Gold House	2026	Gold100 List (Note: with Maggie Kang, Michelle Wong, Arden Cho, Ji-young Yoo, Ejae, Audrey Nuna & Rei Ami)	Included	
The Hollywood Reporter	2026	Animation Power List	Included	
