= Red Doors =

2005 film by Georgia Lee

- Theatrical poster
- Directed by: Georgia Lee
- Written by: Georgia Lee
- Produced by: Georgia Lee; Mia Riverton; Jane Chen
- Starring: Tzi Ma; Jacqueline Kim; Elaine Kao; Kathy Shao-Lin Lee; Freda Foh Shen; Mia Riverton; Sebastian Stan
- Distributed by: Warner Brothers; Polychrome Pictures
- Release dates: April 22, 2005 (Tribeca Film Festival); September 8, 2006 (United States)
- Running time: 90 minutes
- Country: United States
- Language: English

Red Doors is a 2005 American independent comedy drama film written and directed by Georgia Lee. Inspired by the director's own family, the film tells the coming of age story of a Chinese American family in the New York City suburbs. While the film's title refers to the red door of the Wongs' New York home, the color red is generally said to bring good luck in Chinese culture. At the 2005 Tribeca Film Festival, Red Doors won the prize for Best Narrative Feature. Lee produced the movie alongside Jane Chen, Mia Riverton, and co-producer John Fiorelli.

== Plot ==
Ed Wong is the father of three daughters. Samantha, the eldest daughter, is a businesswoman facing her thirtieth birthday and is engaged to Mark. A run-in with her ex-boyfriend Alex forces her to reevaluate her career and love life. Julie, the shy middle sister, is a fourth-year medical student who enjoys ballroom dance classes. Julie begins to question her life choices when she meets Mia Scarlett. Youngest sister Katie is in her senior year of high school and is involved in a prank war with her neighbor and nemesis Simon.

Ed decides to relive his family's history through VHS footage. Between the happier times of the past and his present cold reality, Ed feels it is best to leave home. After retiring, he makes plans to escape from his life in the suburbs, yet his daughters have other plans. While the Wongs each face their own struggles, the family learns to communicate again through the stories and images of the past.

== Cast ==
- Jacqueline Kim as Samantha Wong. The oldest daughter engaged to Mark.
- Elaine Kao as Julie Wong, the middle daughter and medical student.
- Kathy Shao-Lin Lee as Katie Wong, the youngest daughter and senior in high school.
- Tzi Ma as Ed Wong, the suicidal father.
- Sebastian Stan as Simon, involved in a prank war with Katie.
- Freda Foh Shen as May-Li Wong, the mother.
- Jayce Bartok as Mark, Samantha's fiancé.
- Rossif Sutherland as Alex, a musician and ex-boyfriend of Samantha.
- Mia Riverton as Mia Scarlett, a TV and film actress dating Julie.

== Production ==
Lee, a Philadelphia native and oldest of three sisters, wrote and produced her first full-length film in 2005. Although Red Doors was Lee's first full-length feature film, her first short film was called The Big Dish which was produced while taking film classes at NYU. Lee stated that Red Doors benefits from different aspects shown in all of the short films. The film was financed independently because Lee said Hollywood producers wanted to make the Wongs a Caucasian family for commercial purposes. In order to produce the film independent of ordinary Hollywood productions, Lee formed Blanc de Chine, a production company that she would further run herself and with the help of college friends.

When asked why the film is important to her, Lee stated that the story started as her own, yet while creating the script she was more interested in the backstory and how to capture a unique period of time in a family's dynamic. Lee further said she was interested in correcting some of the typical stereotypes of Asian Americans usually portrayed in film. The home video footage seen in the film are actual home videos shot by Lee's father as she was growing up. The videos were incorporated into the film due to the production's minimal budget.

== Reception ==
On review aggregator website Rotten Tomatoes, Red Doors has a 64% approval rating based on 25 reviews, with an average score of 6.0/10. The site's critics consensus reads, "Flawed yet filled with finely detailed characters, Red Doors is a glimpse of the Asian-American experience that suggests great promise for writer-director Georgia Lee."

Thelma Adams of Us Weekly said, "Lee paints a rich and insightful family portrait that is both funny and tender." She added although the film paints a truthful image, the performances by the male actors of the film were no match compared to the actresses and the "winning sister story." Sheri Linden of The Hollywood Reporter wrote, "Lee's comedy-drama is big on heart but never sappy, without overdoing the quirk factor or the melodrama, Lee shows a sure feel for family dynamics." In the New York Daily News, Elizabeth Weitzman stated, "There's enough affection and insight to make Lee's next movie worth watching for."

Ty Burr of The Boston Globe wrote, "The script has a sure feeling for the cross-currents of family tensions, but the filmmaker isn't sure how hard to bear down, and the various stories never convincingly knit together. Lee has promise, though."

Janet Hanson of The Wall Street Journal wrote, "This is a hilariously funny and unbelievably revealing film about an Asian family living in the U.S. and dealing with the colliding worlds of their traditional heritage and their current reality. The choices they must make as individuals, as family members and as Asian Americans are sometimes humorous, sometimes heartbreaking -- and ultimately self-defining for the characters, the filmmakers and those of us who watch the film."

Las Vegas Weekly called the film, "charming, honest and heartfelt", while The New York Times described it as a "unique and yet a universal story." Logan Hill of NewYorkMetro.com stated, "Georgia Lee's understated family drama about a Chinese American family in the New York burbs, is an artfully observed, promising debut."

== Awards ==
- Best Narrative Feature Award in the New York, New York Competition at the Tribeca Film Festival, 2005
- Special Jury Award for Ensemble Acting at CineVegas
- Audience Award at Outfest
- Grand Jury Award for Screenwriting at Outfest
