= Mia Riverton =

American film actress and producer (born 1978)

- Born: Esther Tonia Riggin; November 22, 1978 (age 47); Columbus, Ohio, U.S.
- Other name: Mia Esther Riverton

Mia Riverton is an American film actress and producer, best known for her role in the 2005 film Red Doors.

== Personal life ==
Riverton was born Esther Tonia Riggin in Columbus, Ohio on November 22, 1977. Her mother, Alice Riggin, is an immigrant from Taiwan, and her father, Ralph Riggin, is of Irish and Cherokee descent. She has a younger brother, Daniel.

She grew up in Carmel, Indiana, where she attended the Park Tudor School. In 1999, she graduated cum laude and Phi Beta Kappa from Harvard University.

In 2007, she married David Alpert at a beach wedding in Fiji.

== Career ==
Her work includes producing and starring in the 2006 film Red Doors. A singer as well, Riverton has performed at Carnegie Hall. She was also in the 2003 film 13 Dead Men.

== Filmography ==
- Spare Parts (2015)
- Open House (2010)
- Red Doors (2005)
- 13 Dead Men (2003)
