= Perfect Girl (film) =

Upcoming psychological thriller film

- Directed by: Hong Won-ki
- Written by: Lynn Q. Yu
- Produced by: Scott Strauss; Basil Iwanyk; Erica Lee; Arden Cho
- Starring: Adeline Rudolph; Arden Cho; Jeon Somi; John Harlan Kim; May Hong
- Production companies: Badlands; Desert Bloom; Thunder Road Films; Renegade; Atlantic Records; The Black Label
- Countries: United States; South Korea
- Language: English

Perfect Girl is an upcoming psychological thriller film directed by Hong Won-ki and written by Lynn Q. Yu. A co-production of South Korea and the United States, the film stars Adeline Rudolph, Arden Cho, Jeon Somi, John Harlan Kim, and May Hong.

== Premise ==
A new K-pop girl group is being formed, and several members are hopefully competing with each other to make the four-person cut before the debut concert. With only a week before the final cut, a new girl enters the competition, and suddenly girls are being stalked and attacked.

== Cast ==
- Adeline Rudolph as Soyeon
- Arden Cho as Grace
- Jeon Somi as Sara
- John Harlan Kim as Daniel
- May Hong
- Peter Lee Jae Yoon
- Samantha Cochran as Jae
- Achiraya Nitibhon
- Nancy McDonie
- Kim Siyoon
- Park Chaerin as Nari
- Emily Mei as Hana

== Production ==
Writer Lynn Q. Yu "fell down the K-pop rabbit hole" during the COVID-19 pandemic after watching the Blackpink documentary Light Up the Sky (2020), and was inspired by the competitive trainee system, as well as learning of several trainees who were cut while finalizing Blackpink's lineup. On what inspired the thriller nature of the script, then titled Unnie, she shares, "I made a comment to my friend at the time: ‘Surely someone has killed someone in order to secure a place and a K-pop group.’ I just made that joke and kind of filed it away." She also added the idea of trainees being up not just because of the system, but because of "someone younger and hotter and more talented came up and supplanted them."

After finishing drafts of Unnie by 2022, the film was optioned to different production companies and studios for it to be greenlit, but Yu backed out of one deal because she felt she was being lowballed as it was days before the 2023 Hollywood strikes. Yu's script received little traction until it was voted onto The Black List of best unproduced screenplays in 2023. She also received encouragement from executives who were K-pop fans themselves.

The project was picked up by production company Badlands, along with Thunder Road Films, and Hong Won-ki was hired to direct in July 2024. The film was later retitled Perfect Girl, and Arden Cho joined the producing team.

Casting first began in January 2025 with Adeline Rudolph and Cho as the leads, followed by Jeon Somi and John Harlan Kim much later in the year. Somi was mentioned by Yu as one of her ideal cast members for the project. Principal photography began in late October 2025 in Thailand, with May Hong, Peter Lee Jae Yoon, Samantha Cochran, AC Bonifacio, Achiraya Nitibhon, Nancy, Siyoon, and Chaerin rounding out the cast.

Principal photography began in Thailand. In November 2025, Bonifacio suffered a motorcycle taxi accident on a day off, breaking her humerus. The production had finished several weeks of filming, but ultimately decided her role would have to be recast and reshoots would be needed.

On November 5, 2026, Atlantic Records and The Black Label joined as co-production companies for the film, and will also produce the original soundtrack album.
