= Partner Track =

2022 Netflix American legal drama series

- Genre: Legal drama
- Based on: The Partner Track by Helen Wan
- Developed by: Georgia Lee
- Showrunners: Georgia Lee; Sarah Goldfinger
- Starring: Arden Cho; Alexandra Turshen; Bradley Gibson; Dominic Sherwood; Rob Heaps; Nolan Gerard Funk; Matthew Rauch; Roby Attal
- Music by: Allyson Newman & Heather McIntosh
- Country of origin: United States
- Original language: English
- No. of seasons: 1
- No. of episodes: 10

Production
- Executive producers: Georgia Lee; Sarah Goldfinger; Kim Shumway; Kristen Campo; Tony Hernandez; Julie Anne Robinson
- Producers: John Skidmore; Molly McMillen; Antoine Douaihy
- Cinematography: Tobias Datum; Hollis Meminger; Moira Morel
- Editors: Karoliina Tuovinen; Shawn Paper; Laura Weinberg; Martin Wilson
- Running time: 40–45 minutes
- Production companies: Glee Pictures; Synecdoche Productions; Campout Productions; Jax Media

Original release
- Network: Netflix
- Release: August 26, 2022

Partner Track is an American legal drama television series developed by Georgia Lee, based on Helen Wan's 2013 novel The Partner Track. It premiered on Netflix on August 26, 2022. In November 2022, the series was canceled after one season.

== Cast and characters ==
=== Main ===
- Arden Cho as Ingrid Yun, a M&A lawyer who is trying to make partner at her law firm, Parsons Valentine & Hunt
- Alexandra Turshen as Rachel Friedman, Ingrid's best friend who works as a litigation attorney at Parsons Valentine & Hunt
- Bradley Gibson as Tyler Robinson, Ingrid's other best friend who works as an intellectual property lawyer at Parsons Valentine & Hunt and is trying to make partner
- Dominic Sherwood as Jeff Murphy, an attorney who recently transferred from Parsons Valentine & Hunt's London office and Ingrid's one-night stand from 6 years ago
- Rob Heaps as Nick Laren, Ingrid's love interest
- Nolan Gerard Funk as Dan Fallon, a fellow lawyer at Parsons Valentine & Hunt who is trying to make partner
- Matthew Rauch as Marty Adler, the M&A managing partner at Parsons Valentine & Hunt
- Roby Attal as Justin Coleman, Ingrid's paralegal at Parsons Valentine & Hunt

=== Recurring ===
- Lena Ahn as Lina Yun, Ingrid's younger sister
- Desmond Chiam as Zi-Xin 'Z' Min
- Catherine Curtin as Margo
- Fredric Lehne as Ted Lassiter
- Ronald Peet as Anthony, Tyler's boyfriend who is a political candidate in New York City
- Zane Phillips as Hunter Reed
- Will Stout as Todd Ames
- Rich Ting as Carter Min
- Daniel Gerroll as Raymond Vanderlin
- Alejandro Hernandez as Valdo
- Esther Moon as Soo-Jung Yun, Ingrid's mother
- Jo Sung as Sang-Hoon Yun, Ingrid's father

=== Guest starring ===
- Becky Ann Baker as Gigi Weaver
- Tehmina Sunny as Victoria St. Clair

== Episodes ==
| No. | Title | Directed by | Written by | Original release date |
|---|---|---|---|---|
| 1 | "Material Adverse Change" | Julie Anne Robinson | Teleplay by : Georgia Lee | August 26, 2022 |
Keen to make partner in the Mergers & Acquisitions (M&A) division of prestigious law firm Parsons Valentine and Hunt, Ingrid Yun competes with her main rival Dan Fallon to work with the M&A managing partner Marty Adler on a deal for energy conglomerate Sun Corp to acquire Chinese firm Min Enterprises. Amidst her competition with Dan, matters are complicated for Ingrid by the new British transfer, Jeff Murphy, to the New York office. Jeff and Ingrid shared a passionate weekend together six years prior at a wedding, an encounter which left a lasting impression on Ingrid but that Jeff seemingly doesn't remember. Ingrid also begins dating wealthy philanthropist Nick Laren whilst simultaneously dealing with her wayward sister Lina. When Marty informs Dan and Ingrid that only one of them can continue working on the Sun Corp deal, Dan edges out Ingrid by using his DOE connections, devastating Ingrid. However, at a reception hosted by Nick, Ingrid encounters Dan's DOE contact and realizes he is drunkenly talking to a Financial Times journalist working on a story about the rumored acquisition. To save the deal from being prematurely revealed, Ingrid proposes an expedited plan to Marty and works through the weekend with her staff to get the deal ready for a Monday morning agreement. She successfully does so, outmaneuvering Dan in the process. As she celebrates her victory, Jeff reveals that he remembers their passionate weekend "very well".
| 2 | "Meta-Strategy" | Julie Anne Robinson | Sarah Goldfinger | August 26, 2022 |
| 3 | "Change of Venue" | Kevin Berlandi | Conway Preston | August 26, 2022 |
| 4 | "Due Diligence" | Kevin Berlandi | Nikki Goldwaser | August 26, 2022 |
| 5 | "Out of Office" | Tanya Wexler | D.C. Rogers | August 26, 2022 |
| 6 | "Client Relations" | Tanya Wexler | Kim Shumway | August 26, 2022 |
| 7 | "Talking Points" | Lily Mariye | Katie Do | August 26, 2022 |
| 8 | "Consequential Damages" | Lily Mariye | Mira Z. Barnum | August 26, 2022 |
| 9 | "Pro Forma" | Adam Brooks | Kim Shumway | August 26, 2022 |
| 10 | "Dawn Raid" | Adam Brooks | Georgia Lee | August 26, 2022 |

== Production ==
=== Development ===
On September 14, 2021, Netflix gave production a series order consisting ten episodes. Partner Track is developed by Georgia Lee who is expected to executive produce alongside Sarah Goldfinger, Tony Hernandez, and Kristen Campo. Lee and Goldfinger also served as co-showrunners. The series is based on Helen Wan's 2013 novel The Partner Track who is set to be a consultant for the series. Julie Anne Robinson is set to direct the first two episodes of the series. Tanya Wexler, Kevin Berlandi, Lily Mariye, and Charles Randolph-Wright are also set to direct some episodes. Jax Media is the production company involved producing the series. It was filmed in New York. The series premiered on August 26, 2022. On November 8, 2022, Netflix canceled the series after one season.

=== Casting ===
Upon series order announcement, Arden Cho, Bradley Gibson, Alexandra Turshen, Nolan Gerard Funk, Dominic Sherwood, Rob Heaps, and Matthew Rauch were cast in starring roles. On October 29, 2021, Desmond Chiam and Tehmina Sunny joined the cast in recurring roles. On December 20, 2021, Lena Ahn was cast in a recurring capacity.

== Reception ==
The review aggregator website Rotten Tomatoes reported a 62% approval rating with an average rating of 5.7/10, based on 13 critic reviews. Metacritic, which uses a weighted average, assigned a score of 45 out of 100 based on 4 critics, indicating "mixed or average reviews".

Between August 21 and September 11 the show was watched for 66.01 million hours globally.
