= Sayan Sanya =

Thai luk thung singer (1953–2013)

Sayan Sanya สายัณห์ สัญญา
- Sayan in 1976

Background information
- Born: Sayan Deesamer; 31 January 1953; Suphan Buri province, Thailand
- Died: 11 September 2013 (aged 60) Bangkok, Thailand
- Genres: Luk thung
- Occupations: Singer; actor
- Instrument: Vocals
- Years active: 1970–2013
- Label: Diamond Studio

Sayan Deesamer (Thai: สายัณห์ ดีเสมอ) better known by his stage name Sayan Sanya (Thai: สายัณห์ สัญญา, 31 January 1953 – 11 September 2013) was a famous Thai music singer. His popular songs include Kai Ja, Look Sao Phoo Karn, Ai Num Rod Thay, etc.

== Early life ==
Nicknamed Pao (Thai: เป้า), Sayan was born on January 31, 1953, to a poor family in Suphan Buri province. He has a half-brother who died when he was young. He finished educated in primary 4 and he worked in jobs since he was young.

== Music career ==
He began his singing career in 1970, so he worked many jobs until he recorded first album Luk Sao Phoo Karn. In 1973, he soon became a Luk thung star, performing both on stage and in films for more than 40 years. In 1980s, he became popular with the song Kai Ja, written by Piya Trakoonrat.

In 1982, he had throat surgery, which made him hoarse. His fanclub got his nickname that of The great charm hoarse (แหบมหาเส่นห์). His identity quote was "Love Sayan a little, but I wish you love me forever." (รักสายัณห์น้อยๆ แต่ขอให้นานๆ).

== Personal life ==
He was married to Wannaporn Samrith, and they had 4 children. Sawamini, Siraprapha, Wisarat and Pattarakanya Sanya.

== Death ==
The Thai music world was shocked when Sayan died of cancer on September 11, 2013, at the age 60.

== Partial Discography ==
- Kon Aok Hak Pak Bann Ne (คนอกหักพักบ้านนี้)
- Kai Ja (ไก่จ๋า)
- Lan Tae Te Satern (ลานเทสะเทือน)
- Ai Noom Rot Tai (ไอ้หนุ่มรถไถ)
- Lon Klaw Paw Thai (ล้นเกล้าเผ่าไทย, Song about King Bhumibol Adulyadej)
- Ting Ter Pu Pan Doongjai (ถึงเธอผู้เป็นดวงใจ)
- Look Sao Phoo Karn (ลูกสาวผู้การ)
- Am Nat Haeng Kwam Khit Thung (อำนาจแห่งความคิดถึง)
- Dae Aswin Nai Doongjai (แด่อัศวินในดวงใจ, Song about Thaksin Shinawatra)
