= Helen Wan =

American novelist and lawyer (born 1973)

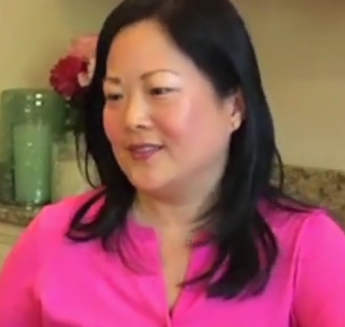
- Wan in 2013
- Born: Helen Catherine Wan; January 29, 1973 (age 53); Monterey County, California, U.S.
- Education: Amherst College (BA); University of Virginia (JD)
- Occupations: Novelist, lawyer
- Website: http://www.helenwan.com

Helen Catherine Wan (born January 29, 1973) is a Taiwanese-American novelist and lawyer. She is the author of the 2013 novel The Partner Track, the story of a young Chinese-American woman poised to become the first minority female partner at a powerful, prestigious corporate law firm and the basis for the 2022 series Partner Track.

== Early life and education ==
Wan was born in Monterey County, California, to a Taiwanese American family. She was raised near Washington, D.C. Her parents, Peter and Catherine Wan, were Taiwanese immigrants who met in Taiwan and immigrated to the U.S. in the 1960s. They were originally waishengren who left China during the Great Retreat.

After graduating from Thomas Jefferson High School for Science and Technology, Wan attended Amherst College, where she graduated with a Bachelor of Arts in English literature in 1990. She then earned a Juris Doctor (J.D.) from the University of Virginia School of Law in 1998.

== Legal career ==
Prior to becoming a full-time author and lecturer, she was Associate General Counsel at the Time Inc. division of Time Warner Inc. and a corporate and media attorney at the law firms Frankfurt Kurnit Klein & Selz, P.C. and Paul, Weiss, Rifkind, Wharton & Garrison, and practised media and corporate law in New York City for over fifteen years.

== Writing ==
Wan's novel, The Partner Track, was first published by St. Martin's Press in September 2013 and became the subject of a Washington Post Magazine cover story, has been optioned for television, and is now being taught in law schools and universities. Wan is also a frequently invited speaker at corporations, law firms, law schools, universities, leadership and diversity conferences, and bar associations on diversity and inclusion in corporate America and advancing the careers of women, Asian Americans and women of color. She has also been a contributor to CNN, The Washington Post, The Daily Beast, The Huffington Post, and many other publications.
