= Story artist =

Screenwriting role

Story artist is a credit given to additional screenwriters on animated films who do not share in the screenplay or story credit, as can be seen on Pixar and Disney animated films. This practice was started at Walt Disney Studios in the 1930s.
