= Arden Cho =

American entertainer (born 1985)

- Cho in 2026
- Born: August 16, 1985 (age 41); Amarillo, Texas, U.S.
- Education: University of Illinois, Urbana-Champaign (BA)
- Occupations: Actress; model
- Years active: 2006–present
- Agent: Innovative Artists
- Spouse: Christopher Lee (m. 2026)

Arden Lim Cho (born August 16, 1985) is an American actress and model. Cho first gained recognition by portraying Kira Yukimura in the MTV series Teen Wolf (2013–2016), as well as her several YouTube collaborations. She has since starred in several Netflix projects, including the legal drama series Partner Track (2022), the live-action adaptation of Avatar: The Last Airbender (2024), and the lead speaking role of Rumi in the Sony Pictures Animation film KPop Demon Hunters (2025).

== Early life ==
Cho was born on August 16, 1985, in Amarillo, Texas, to South Korean immigrant parents, and was raised in San Antonio and Plano, Texas. In a 2014 interview, she stated that growing up in areas with few ethnic minorities, she often felt like an outsider. As a child, she was bullied and was hospitalized twice for injuries after being physically attacked. She attended high school in Apple Valley, Minnesota.

Cho attended the University of Illinois Urbana-Champaign with the intention of becoming a lawyer. She took her first drama classes there and developed an interest in the acting profession. There, she also became more exposed to Asian American culture at large.

== Career ==
=== Acting ===
Cho spent the summer following her graduation on a medical missionary trip in Kenya. She then moved to Los Angeles, where she worked odd jobs while trying to pursue a career in acting. Although she did not have any screen credits at the time, her first agent took her on due to her resume of musical and physical talents, which included ballet, cello, and piano. Cho has appeared in films, television series, and commercials in the United States and Asia. In 2008, Cho played the grown-up lead of Hyori (the younger version being played by Megan Lee) in the short film My First Crush, directed by Rocky Jo.

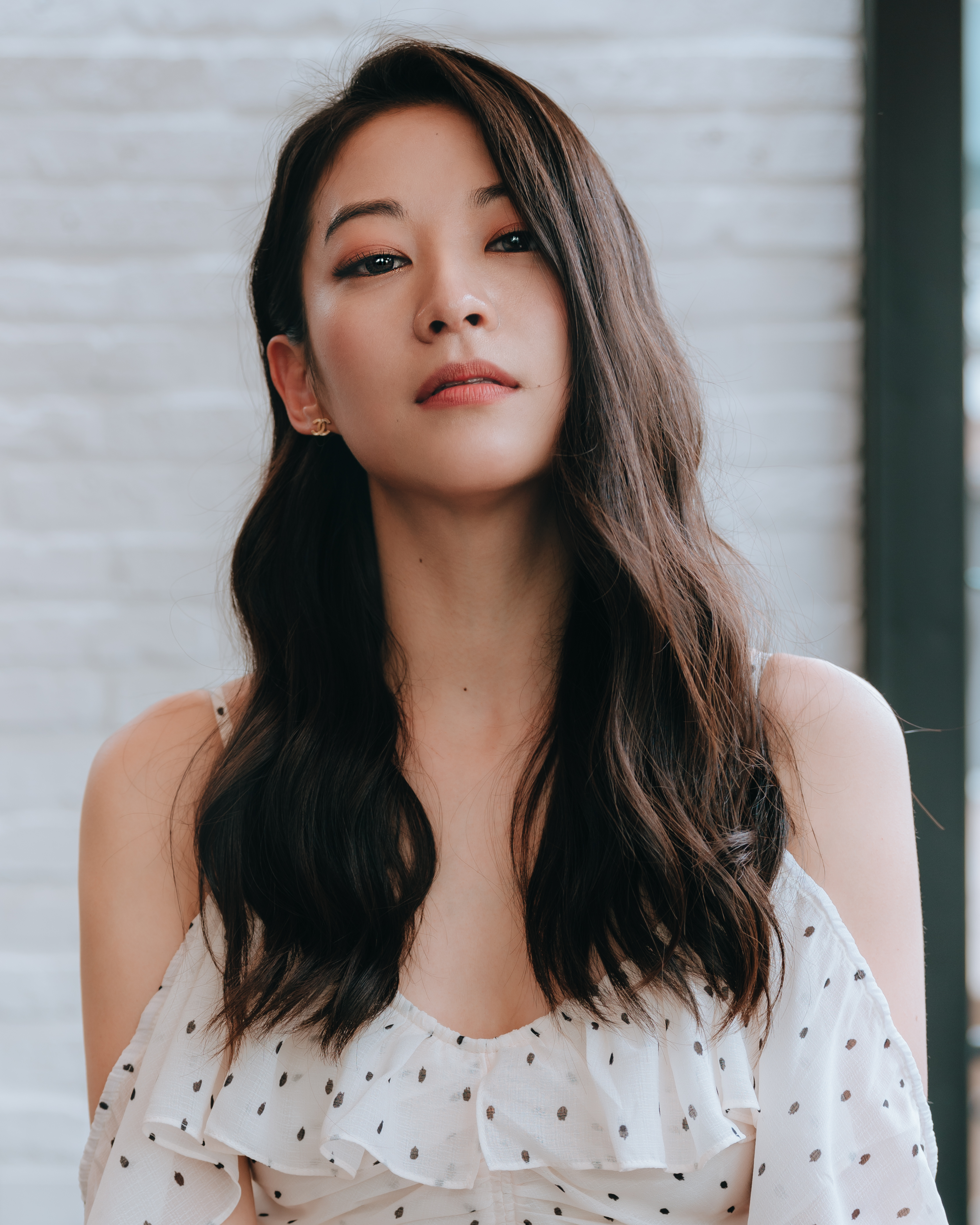
Cho in 2019

In 2011, she appeared in the role of Pru, a friend of Paige McCullers in the season 1 episode "Someone to Watch Over Me" of the ABC Family show Pretty Little Liars. She also appeared in the role of Gia in the monster film Mega Python vs. Gatoroid, directed by Mary Lambert. In 2014, Cho joined the TV series Teen Wolf as Kira, starting as a recurring character in the series's third season. She was promoted to a main cast role in the fourth season. In April 2016, ahead of her talk at University of Illinois at Chicago for Asian American Awareness Month, Cho posted a YouTube video on her personal channel revealing that she would not return for the sixth season of Teen Wolf. In 2017, Cho was cast as a recurring character on season 3 of Chicago Med as Dr. Ethan Choi's sister.

Beginning in 2022, Cho starred in several projects for Netflix, including the lead role of Ingrid Yun in the television series Partner Track, which lasted for one season. She later said that its cancellation left her dispirited, as she "thought that was going to be my moment, then it wasn't. I pretty much quit the business and retired." She appeared as June in the 2024 live-action adaptation of Avatar: The Last Airbender, after which she took a hiatus lasting a year and a half, much of which she spent traveling. Cho auditioned the role of Rumi in the Netflix animated musical film KPop Demon Hunters, attracted by the film's Korean subject. She had intended it to be her final project but found the making of it motivated her to continue acting. Upon its release in 2025, KPop Demon Hunters was a major hit, becoming Netflix's most watched animated film of all time by July 2025 and eventually Netflix's most-watched film ever at 236 million views by August, surpassing Red Notice (2021). Cho received a number of honors, including the Annie Award, for her performance as Rumi.

Cho was included in the "100 Most Powerful Women in 2025" list by Forbes. In 2026, she was included in Gold House's "100 Asia-Pacific Leaders with the Greatest Cultural Impact in the World" list. That same year, she was named to The Hollywood Reporter's inaugural Animation Power List for her work on KPop Demon Hunters.

=== YouTube ===
Cho was previously a part of the "Artichoke and Peachies" joint YouTube blogging channel with Grace Su. The account has since been shut down. She has also appeared in the web series KTown Cowboys. She has her own YouTube channel, ardenBcho, with over 300 videos, predominantly featuring vlogging, song covers, and original music videos. She had over 531,000 subscribers as of May 2025. In July 2025, Cho collaborated with actor and singer Cha Eun-woo on a cover of "Free", a song from KPop Demon Hunters.

=== Modeling ===
Cho won the 2004 Miss Korea Chicago competition, giving her the opportunity to take part in the Miss Korea Pageant in Seoul. At one point, she was in talks for a television show in Korea but walked away from the opportunity due to weight loss and plastic surgery requirements. In 2010, the cosmetic brand Clinique announced Cho as the model for their newest advertisement campaign in Asia. The campaign was launched in mid-November 2010. Cho modeled for Reebok Korea in 2010 and for Nike Japan in 2008. She has also modeled for Apple and Alexander McQueen and appeared in Vogue, Purple Fashion and Nylon Magazine.

=== Music ===
In 2010, Cho and Ktown Cowboys actor Shane Yoon were the MCs for the Korean music group JYJ's tour in the United States. In 2011, Cho released her first single, "I'm Just a Girl". Cho was the co-writer, composer and singer; Ed Huang was co-writer and music producer. On February 25, 2011, Cho released a self-produced music video for the single on YouTube featuring Tim Lacatena. Cho had plans to tour her debut EP My True Happy in 2013 before landing a recurring role on Teen Wolf. Cho premiered her single "Simply" in September 2019. In August 2025, Cho and Cha Eun-woo released a cover of "Free" from KPop Demon Hunters as a single on major music streaming platforms.

=== Other ventures ===
Cho is an avid, highly-ranked poker player and has been playing since 2002. She competed in the 2018 World Series of Poker Main Event, placing 662nd for $21,750. Her biggest live cash was in January 2024 at the PGT Championship $1,000,000 freeroll: she came in second, winning $200,000.

On February 6, 2019, it was announced that Cho had become CEO of Leonard & Church, a New York City-based watch company. The company closed in 2020.

== Personal life ==
Cho is a Christian. She has a black belt in taekwondo and grew up training with her father, who is a grandmaster. In April 2021, in the midst of an uptick in anti-Asian racism regarding the COVID-19 pandemic, Cho said she was walking her dog when a man called her slurs and threatened her life. She picked up her dog and ran when he approached her. She said the increase in hate crimes "has triggered a lot of these [childhood] memories". Cho announced her wedding plans to her fiancé to People magazine in April 2025. She married her orthopedic surgeon husband, Christopher Lee, in Florence, Italy, over the weekend of June 27, 2026.

== Filmography ==
Key
†	Denotes films that have not yet been released

=== Film ===
Year	Title	Role	Notes
2010	Agents of Secret Stuff	Taylor	Short film
2011	Mega Python vs. Gatoroid	Gia	
2012	Picture Perfect		Short film
2013	The Baytown Outlaws	Angel	
2016	Stuck	Alicia	Also associate producer
2018	The Honor List	Honor Liang	
2025	KPop Demon Hunters	Rumi	Speaking voice
2026	The Last House	Adult Ruth	Speaking voice
TBA	Cheap AF †		Post-production
TBA	Perfect Girl †		Post-production; also producer

=== Television ===
Year	Title	Role	Notes	Ref.
2008	MADtv		Season 13, episode 11	
2009	CSI: NY	Gahee Paik	Episode: "Communication Breakdown"	
2011	Pretty Little Liars	Pru	Episode: "Someone to Watch Over Me"	
2011	Rizzoli & Isles	Lee	Episode: "My Own Worst Enemy"	
2012	Walking the Halls	Kylie	Television film	
2014–2016	Teen Wolf	Kira Yukimura	Recurring role (season 3); main role (seasons 4–5)	
2014	Castle	Kiara	Episode: "The Way of the Ninja"	
2015	Hawaii Five-0	Mia Price	Episode: "Kuka'awale (Stakeout)"	
2016	Tween Fest	Lexii C.	Main role	
2017	Freakish	Tonya	Guest role; 2 episodes	
2017–2018	Miss 2059	Arden Young	Main role (season 2)	
2018–2019	Chicago Med	Emily Choi	Recurring role	
2022	Partner Track	Ingrid Yun	Main role	
2024	Avatar: The Last Airbender	June	2 episodes	

=== Video games ===
Year	Title	Voice role	Ref.
2013	Tomb Raider	Samantha Nishimura / Stephanie / Sun Queen	

=== Web series ===
Year	Title	Role	Notes	Ref.
2010	KTown Cowboys	Sarah		
2012	Video Game High School	Korean TV hostess	Episode: "Shot Heard Round the World"	

=== Music video appearances ===
Year	Title	Artist(s)	Ref.
2014	"Write it in the Sky" (Ken Loi Remix)	Kina Grannis	
2019	"Ready for the Ride"	Amber Liu	

=== Theatre ===
Year	Title	Role	Notes	Ref.
2024	Maybe Happy Ending	Jiyeon	Video footage	

== Awards and nominations ==
Year	Award	Category	Work	Result	Ref.
2025	Alliance of Women Film Journalists	Female Focus: Best Voice Performances in Animated Film	KPop Demon Hunters	Won	
2025	Asia Artist Awards	Best Voice Performance	KPop Demon Hunters	Won	
2025	Associated Press	Breakthrough Entertainers of the Year	KPop Demon Hunters	Won	
2025	Atlanta Film Critics Circle	Best Voice Performance	KPop Demon Hunters	Won	
2025	Austin Film Critics Association	Best Voice Acting / Animated / Digital Performance (with Ejae)	KPop Demon Hunters	Nominated	
2025	St. Louis Film Critics Association	Best Vocal Performance	KPop Demon Hunters	Runner-up	
2025	Washington D.C. Area Film Critics Association	Best Voice Performance	KPop Demon Hunters	Won	
2026	Annie Awards	Best Voice Acting – Feature	KPop Demon Hunters	Won	
2026	Astra Film Awards	Best Voice Over Performance	KPop Demon Hunters	Won	
2026	Denver Film Critics Society	Best Non-Live Action Performance	KPop Demon Hunters	Nominated	
2026	Nickelodeon Kids' Choice Awards	Favorite Female Animated Voice from a Movie	KPop Demon Hunters	Won	
2026	Nickelodeon Kids' Choice Awards	Favorite On-Screen Duo/Trio (with Ji-young Yoo, May Hong)	KPop Demon Hunters	Nominated	
2026	North Carolina Film Critics Association	Best Voice Performance In Animation or Mixed Media	KPop Demon Hunters	Won	
2026	The Online Film & Television Association	Best Voice-Over Performance	KPop Demon Hunters	Won	
2026	Pittsburgh Film Critics Association	Best Animated Voice Performance	KPop Demon Hunters	Won	
