= Fame Is a Gun =

2025 single by Addison Rae

Single by Addison Rae

from the album Addison
- B-side: "Fame Is a Gun" (Myra Molloy remix); "Fame Is a Gun" (tour remix)
- Released: May 30, 2025
- Studio: Jungle City
- Genre: Synth-pop; alt-pop
- Length: 3:03
- Label: Columbia; As Long As I'm Dancing
- Songwriters: Addison Rae Easterling; Elvira Anderfjärd; Luka Kloser
- Producers: Luka Kloser; Elvira Anderfjärd

Addison Rae singles chronology
| "Headphones On" (2025) | "Fame Is a Gun" (2025) |

Music video
- "Fame Is a Gun" on YouTube

"Fame Is a Gun" is a song by American singer Addison Rae. It was released on May 30, 2025, through Columbia Records, as the fifth and final single from her debut studio album, Addison (2025). She wrote the track alongside the producers Luka Kloser and Elvira Anderfjärd. The synth-driven alt-pop song explores her longing for fame and the emotional costs tied to that ambition.

The song received critical acclaim from music critics. "Fame Is a Gun" reached the top forty of the charts in the United Kingdom, Ireland, Australia, and New Zealand, and became her third entry on the Billboard Hot 100 following "Diet Pepsi" and "Headphones On".

== Background ==
"Fame Is a Gun" serves as the fifth single from Rae's debut studio album, Addison. Prior to the album's release, scheduled for June 6, Rae released four singles: "Diet Pepsi", "Aquamarine", "High Fashion", and "Headphones On". The album follows her debut extended play, AR, released in August 2023. In an interview with Elle, Rae described the album as introspective and optimistic, noting that the lyrics played a central role in shaping its sound. She also emphasized the collaborative nature of the project, developed alongside producers Luka Kloser and Elvira Anderfjärd. She added: "I always knew I wanted to be famous, to be a movie star, to be a singer—to just be a performer. That was always something I wanted—the glamour and the fashion." The song's cover art is a photograph of Rae posing as a child while wearing shades indoors, with The Face noting that it "chimes with the message of the single: that Addison is – and always has been – determined to be a star." Rae recorded the song in New York, while trying to come up with a "straight pop song" for her record label, and going for a vibe that was "uptempo and sexy and a little dark."

== Composition ==
"Fame Is a Gun" is a synth-pop song, with a length of three minutes and three seconds, produced by Anderfjärd and Kloser, who served as Rae's co-writers. In the lyrics, Rae addresses her relationship with notoriety, comparing fame to a firearm, and contending with her unapologetic desire to be famous. UPI's Jessica Inman considered the lyrics were a nod to Sheila E.'s "The Glamorous Life" which Rae named along with Prince as inspiring her while making the track. In an interview with Apple Music, she explained the song was meant to address "the trials and the tribulations that fame give and present to you." She elaborated: "I do want the glamorous life and that is what we all strive for, is this beautiful life of glitz, glamour and beauty and fame is almost the price that you pay for that life," continuing, "I was trying to dive deeper into this concept of fame is a gun and it's really dangerous and you don't really know what you're doing with it when you experience it, so you are pointing it blind, and you're unsure of what is going to be destroyed by it when you're experiencing it for the first time and it's just really reckless." Rae talked about her favorite moments on the song, stating, "I love the bridge because I love singing in that specific place in my voice. It's a comfortable and interesting register for me. I also love the lyrics," adding that, "I think the song communicates my relationship with fame in a very honest way, and the bridge expands on my desire and craving to be loved and expected."

== Critical reception ==
Amber Chow of Hypebae expressed that the song "echoes the ghosts of edgy alt-pop past — hints of old-school Grimes, early Marina and the Diamonds, peak Britney and a dash of Gaga-era theatrical flair," assessing, "It's chaotic, deliberate and somehow still extremely cohesive." Millie Dunn-Christensen of Notion described it as using Rae's signature formula, "catchy hooks, dancey beats, and introspective lyrics, the track delves into the highs and lows of life in the spotlight." Aaron Williams of Uproxx wrote about the track, stating, "While you mightn't have thought she'd be such a standout pop purveyor, she certainly has a knack for earworm production and hooky, endlessly repeatable choruses." Shaad D'Souza of Paper called it "another immaculate single" from Rae, with "shades of Goldfrapp and Eurythmics hover around this song, but its verbose, slightly silly lyrics are pure Addison." Gabriel Saulog of Billboard Philippines said the track showcases Rae's "synth-pop sensibilities, even taking inspiration from the prismatic pop sounds of the early 2010s" and "is just another example of Rae's ever-evolving musical palette, adding a breadth of versatility to what fans and listeners can expect from the upcoming record."

Davy Reed of The Face compared it to her remix of Charli XCX's "Von Dutch", analysing if that song presented "Addison literally screaming at the trolls who furiously type from their dad's basement, she’s now at a point where she can just shrug off the criticism [as] she sings over a blissful synth pop bounce that would appropriately soundtrack a drive down Sunset Boulevard," concluding, "it's another banger. At this point, you almost feel sorry for her haters." Maria Sherman of the Associated Press called it an "easy song-of-the-summer contender, a sunglasses-in-the-club banger with synthetic vocal textures and an unignorable chorus." Chris Richards praised the track in an album review for the Washington Post, describing it as a "dreams-come-true anthem that spins Gwen Stefani's 'What You Waiting For?' and Laurie Anderson's 'O Superman' into a new kind of cotton candy," assessing, "Is it a perfect pop song? There's no such thing. We're reminded of that whenever someone gets this close." It polled at number 20 in the Triple J Hottest 100 of 2025.

Critics' year-end rankings
| Publication | List | Rank | Ref. |
|---|---|---|---|
| BBC Radio 1 | Radio 1's Biggest Songs of 2025 | 84 | |
| Billboard | The 100 Best Songs of 2025 | 22 | |
| DIY | DIY's 2025 Tracks of the Year | 12 | |
| Hot Press | 50 Best Tracks of 2025 | 26 | |
| Los Angeles Times | The 25 best songs of 2025 | 7 | |
| Paste | The 100 Best Songs of 2025 | 24 | |
| Slant | The 50 Best Songs of 2025 | 7 | |
| Stereogum | The Top 40 Pop Songs of 2025 | 12 | |

== Music video ==
The music video for "Fame Is a Gun" was directed by Sean Price Williams, who had previously worked with Rae in "Diet Pepsi" and "Aquamarine", and features a grainy visual style of "David Lynch meets Gregg Araki". Shot on 16 mm film, the surrealist visuals depict Rae as a glamorous woman wearing a blonde wig, pink trench coat and large dark sunglasses, hosting a formal dinner party, as well as a bystander observing the scene from above. Eventually, the bystander version crashes the party and fights with her glamorous self, culminating in a dance sequence. Daisy Maldonado of Harper's Bazaar observed it as a representation of Rae confronting "her desire for fame and her pursuit of pop stardom." HuffPost UK named it one of the best music videos of 2025, commenting: "Taking a dash of Rocky Horror and more than a sprinkle of Pedro Almodóvar, Addison's 'Fame Is a Gun' video, much like the song itself, mixes Hollywood glamour with out-and-out weirdness, to create some real pop magic."

== Live performances ==
Rae performed the song for the first time at the Box sister venues in New York City and London during special live shows to celebrate the release of her debut album on June 5 and June 10, 2025, respectively. The song was then featured in the setlist of her debut concert, the Addison Tour, in 2025. In October 2025, Carter Faith released a country-style cover version of the song for Amazon Music and performed it at Nashville's Grand Ole Opry.

At the 68th Grammy Awards, Rae performed a shortened version of the song that was included in the Best New Artist medley. Joe Coscarelli of The New York Times named the performance one of the best moments of the night, writing that Rae "sold the effortful staging with the right mix of sass and nonchalance." Billboard's Joe Lynch ranked the performance last among those that night, praising its concept and vision but criticizing Rae's singing. Tobias Hess of The Fader declared that she "won the 2026 Grammys Best New Artist" medley as the "standout" performance "showed off Rae's exceptional Britney-like dance abilities and her impressive falsetto." The Washington Post ranked it the third best performance of the ceremony, also highlighting "the Britney Spears vibes that Rae contorts so effortlessly into something fresh." Business Insider's Callie Ahlgrim listed the performance among the five best of the night, calling Rae a "born performer" and that she "proved that her best new artist nomination was no fluke." Malcia Greene of L'Officiel called it "pop princess perfection", while Cosmopolitan's Corinne Sullivan stated that Rae "delivered, as expected." In June 2026, Rachel Zegler performed an operatic rendition of "Fame Is a Gun" at the Las Culturistas Culture Awards, where the song was nominated for Record of the Year.

== Track listing ==
- Digital download / streaming
1. "Fame Is a Gun" – 3:03
- Urban Outfitters exclusive 7-inch vinyl

Side A

1. "Fame Is a Gun" – 3:03

Side B

1. "Fame Is a Gun" (Myra Molloy remix) – 2:20
2. "Fame Is a Gun" (tour remix) – 3:33

== Charts ==
=== Weekly charts ===
Weekly chart performance
| Chart (2025–2026) | Peak position |
|---|---|
| Australia (ARIA) | 36 |
| Canada Hot 100 (Billboard) | 56 |
| Colombia Anglo Airplay (Monitor Latino) | 13 |
| Estonia Airplay (TopHit) | 46 |
| Global 200 (Billboard) | 61 |
| Greece International (IFPI) | 54 |
| Ireland (IRMA) | 16 |
| Kazakhstan Airplay (TopHit) | 19 |
| Latvia Airplay (LaIPA) | 16 |
| Lithuania (AGATA) | 26 |
| Netherlands (Single Tip) | 7 |
| New Zealand (Recorded Music NZ) | 24 |
| Norway (VG-lista) | 87 |
| Portugal (AFP) | 116 |
| Sweden Heatseeker (Sverigetopplistan) | 2 |
| Sweden Airplay (Radiomonitor) | 84 |
| UK Singles (Official Charts) | 23 |
| US Billboard Hot 100 | 73 |
| US Hot Dance/Pop Songs (Billboard) | 3 |
| US Pop Airplay (Billboard) | 29 |

=== Monthly charts ===
Monthly chart performance
| Chart (2025–2026) | Peak position |
|---|---|
| Estonia Airplay (TopHit) | 83 |
| Kazakhstan Airplay (TopHit) | 32 |
| Lithuania Airplay (TopHit) | 45 |

=== Year-end charts ===
Year-end chart performance
| Chart (2025) | Position |
|---|---|
| US Dance Streaming Songs (Billboard) | 31 |
| US Hot Dance/Pop Songs (Billboard) | 15 |

== Certifications ==
List of certifications and sales
| Region | Certification | Certified units/sales |
|---|---|---|
| Australia (ARIA) | Platinum | 70,000^{‡} |
| Austria (IFPI Austria) | Gold | 15,000^{‡} |
| Brazil (Pro-Música Brasil) | Gold | 20,000^{‡} |
| Canada (Music Canada) | Platinum | 80,000^{‡} |
| France (SNEP) | Gold | 100,000^{‡} |
| Hungary (MAHASZ) | Platinum | 4,000^{‡} |
| New Zealand (RMNZ) | Platinum | 30,000^{‡} |
| Poland (ZPAV) | Gold | 62,500^{‡} |
| United Kingdom (BPI) | Gold | 400,000^{‡} |
| United States (RIAA) | Platinum | 1,000,000^{‡} |
^{‡} Sales+streaming figures based on certification alone.

== Release history ==
List of release dates and formats
| Region | Date | Format(s) | Label(s) | Ref. |
|---|---|---|---|---|
| Various | May 30, 2025 | Digital download; streaming | Columbia; As Long As I'm Dancing | |
| United States | June 24, 2025 | Contemporary hit radio | Columbia | |
| Italy | June 27, 2025 | Radio airplay | Sony Italy | |
| United States | November 11, 2025 | 7-inch vinyl | Columbia | |

== Rebecca Black version ==
In December 2025, American singer and DJ Rebecca Black covered the track for Triple J's Like a Version. For the cover, Rebecca replaced the instruments with layered loops and samples of her own vocals while also increasing the tempo of the song. The performance was met with positive reviews from critics, with ABC stating "Squaring up to Addison Rae's monster pop hit 'Fame Is A Gun', the underrated but undisputed queen of the scene worked her magic for a stunning rendition. Seriously, the amount of talent radiating out of this performance is incredible". Her recording of the song was later added to streaming services.
