= Headphones On =

2025 single by Addison Rae

Single by Addison Rae

from the album Addison
- Released: April 18, 2025
- Studio: MXM
- Genre: Trip hop; pop; R&B
- Length: 4:00 (album version); 3:26 (radio edit)
- Label: Columbia; As Long As I'm Dancing
- Songwriters: Addison Rae Easterling; Elvira Anderfjärd; Luka Kloser
- Producers: Luka Kloser; Elvira Anderfjärd

Addison Rae singles chronology
"High Fashion" (2025)	"Headphones On" (2025)	"Fame Is a Gun" (2025)

Music video
- "Headphones On" on YouTube

"Headphones On" is a song by American singer Addison Rae. The song was released on April 18, 2025, through Columbia Records, as the fourth single from Rae's debut studio album, Addison. The new jack swing-influenced pop, R&B, and trip hop song was written by Rae, Elvira Anderfjärd, and Luka Kloser. Its lyrics discuss how music is an escape for her and her personal struggles.

The song was met with critical acclaim, who favorably compared it to the music of Madonna and Britney Spears. "Headphones On" became Rae's second song to reach the top forty of the charts in the United Kingdom and Ireland, as well as her second entry on the Billboard Hot 100 following her 2024 single "Diet Pepsi". It received a nomination for Song of the Summer at the 2025 MTV Video Music Awards, and was ranked among the best songs of 2025 by music publications such as Pitchfork and NME.

== Background and release ==
Rae teased "Headphones On" in March 2025 by posting pictures on Instagram from the set of the music video. In early April, she teased lyrics from the song, and later teased the music video through Spotify. Rae shared a snippet from the song in a TikTok. She released the official teaser on April 14, which announced the release date, and released the official cover on April 15, 2025. It marked the first track released under Rae's publishing deal with Sony Music Publishing. Rae was sick at the time she recorded the song in Stockholm.

== Composition ==
"Headphones On"
Combining pop, R&B, and trip hop with a new jack swing bounce, "Headphones On" has been likened to the 1990s sound of acts including Madonna, Moby, Björk and Cibo Matto.

"Headphones On" has been described as a pop, R&B, and trip hop track with a new jack swing bounce. According to Pitchfork's Eric Torres, it is Rae's "most R&B-inspired track yet", with a "swell of pitch-shifted, ululating vocals" and "vaporous, jewel-toned chimes and a hip-swaying bassline." He also compared her vocals to "Janet at her breathiest" as Rae "coos over an aerodynamic beat." Danielle Chelosky of Stereogum noted the trip hop influence of the track. Writing for Jenesaispop, Jordi Bardají felt that the song is "based on the sound of that commercial pop that drew from trip-hop and was led by artists like Madonna or, above all, Moby between the mid and late years of [the 1990s]. The beat of 'Headphones On' recalls Bedtime Stories (1994), the strings are more akin to Björk's Post (1995), who already dedicated a track to her 'headphones', those that 'saved her life'; the overall vibe is very Cibo Matto, especially the vocal melody; but it also brings to mind the Spice Girls' 'Last Time Lover'." Alexa Camp of Slant Magazine stated the track boasts a "smooth, new jack swing bounce straight out of 1994." Rae's lyricism was described as "confessional" and diving into deeper topics than her previous releases. She sings about her struggles with identity, escaping into music and how the hardships and pain she feels are a part of life, also addressing her parents' divorce. Cosmopolitan's Samantha Olson noted that Rae continues "the watery references that she first leaned into on 'Aquamarine'" as well. Rae described "Headphones On" as one of her most "emotional songs" to date and "cathartic to make." In the song, Rae acknowledges being called an "it girl" while questioning her place in pop music: "It is obviously very complimentary. What does that even mean, really, to be the pop girl? Let's see if the songs get more popular, then they can call me a pop girl. This is my shot. I've got to go big."

== Critical reception ==
In a review for Pitchfork, Eric Torres described "Headphones On" as a "new wrinkle to the Addison Rae formula, infusing her cotton-candy music with the kind of vulnerability that can make it feel like the outside world's on mute." He also felt that Rae's take on electropop suits the current "shaky cultural moment", as her "featherlight music doubles as a smooth-brain release from the anhedonia of day-to-day life in America." Likewise, Joel Calfee wrote for Harper's Bazaar that Rae is "providing us with the perfect soundtrack for when we need to escape the troubles of the real world." Cosmopolitan's Samantha Olson stated Rae is "four for four right now" after dropping "back-to-back bangers" while Uproxx's Josh Kurp echoed that the track "continues Rae's hot streak." Nathan Merchadier of Numéro claimed the single cemented Rae's status as "one of the defining it-girls of the moment." Robin Murray reviewed the song for Clash, praising that it "feels special [...] this is pop at its most care-free and transformative," continuing that Rae is "stamping out her own identity" and "there’s a real gift for world-building at the centre of 'Headphones On' that feels unique to her," and, "Piece by piece, Addison Rae is chipping away at the veneer of cynicism that some have placed around her music; effortlessly stylish, 'Headphones On' should serve as the tipping point, the moment of inflection." Jade Wickes of The Face called it "eccentric, sugary and vulnerable in equal measure."

Jason Lipshutz of Billboard commented that a "song like 'Headphones On' goes a long way towards dismissing the notion that Addison Rae's pop artistry is superficial in the slightest" as the "single not only synthesizes '90s rhythmic pop with passion and scholarship, but she tucks revealing admissions [...] in between sumptuous refrains." Julia Koscelnik of V drew comparisons to Madonna and Britney Spears, with Rae adding a "more reflective lyrical element to her repertoire of addictive pop hits." Paste named it one of the best new songs of the week, with Matt Mitchell writing that "it keeps her streak of great pop hardware," and while "a sugary, Y2K gloss burns at the heart" of the song, it is "shockingly full of hurt." Mitchell declares it "should be in the conversation for Song of the Summer," calling it "well-done Madonna worship for the doom-scrolling generation." In May, Time Out named it the second best song of 2025 so far: "With nonchalant lyrics dosed in nostalgia, breathy vocals reminiscent of early days Kylie Minogue and soft, effortless percussion, 'Headphones On' is nothing short of irresistible." In June, Rolling Stone and Consequence also listed it among the best songs of the year, with Paolo Ragusa blurbing for the latter: "On a song so serene it genuinely feels like medicine, Rae casually unearths a universal truth: Sometimes you've got to accept the pain, feel your feelings, and put those goddamn headphones on." Paste ranked it the tenth best song of 2025, while Billboard ranked it the eighth, with Lipshutz referring to it as "the skeleton key" of her debut album as well as "of her entire pop aesthetic." Spotify's team of editors picked it as one of the best songs of the year so far that same month.

In August, Pitchfork picked it as one of their 20 contenders for 2025's song of the summer, with Vrinda Jagota reflecting: "The closest I've gotten to finding a sense of direction during these hot, neverending days has been the Zen musings of Addison Rae. Her song 'Headphones On' is about accepting pain and discomfort as inexplicably tied to joy, about seeing the ordinary as sublime, about recognizing that any one moment in your life is as significant as another." In December, The Atlantic's Spencer Kornhaber called it "the year's best pop song." "Headphones On" was nominated for Song of the Summer at the 2025 MTV Video Music Awards. It placed at number ten on The Gummy Awards' top ten songs of 2025 and at number seven on Pitchfork's 2025 readers' poll. It polled at number 65 in the Triple J Hottest 100 of 2025. In February 2026, Spotify listed it as one of the 100 greatest pop songs of the streaming era.

Critics' year-end rankings of "Headphones On"
Publication	List	Rank	Ref.
Consequence	The 200 Best Songs of 2025	170	
Crack	The 25 Best Tracks of 2025	9	
The Guardian	The 20 Best Songs of 2025	5	
The Independent	Our favourite songs of 2025	—N/a	
KTLA	The 50 best songs of 2025	—N/a	
NME	The 50 Best Songs of 2025	8	
Paste	The 100 Best Songs of 2025	52	
Pitchfork	The 100 Best Songs of 2025	4	
Rolling Stone	Rob Sheffield's Top 25 Songs of 2025	4	
Rolling Stone Philippines	25 Songs You Need to Know of 2025	7	
Spotify	Best Pop Songs of 2025	1	
Stereogum	The 50 Best Songs of 2025	3	
Time Out	The 40 Best Songs of 2025	1	
Vogue Australia	Vogue editors' favourite songs of 2025	—N/a	

== Music video ==
The official video for "Headphones On" was released alongside the song on April 18, 2025, with Mitch Ryan returning as director following his previous work with Rae on "High Fashion". Dara Allen also styled the visuals after collaborating with Rae on her previous three music videos. Filmed in Reykjavík, Iceland, the visual opens with Rae daydreaming during a break from her shift at the eponymous supermarket. As she listens to music on her headphones, she imagines herself wandering through the Icelandic countryside where she is seen riding a white horse and has neon pink hair. L'Officiel's Danielle Jaculewicz complimented that Rae "knows how to build a new universe in her music videos" and The Cut's Julia Reinstein said the video is evocative of the late 2000s. Rae described filming it as "a really transformative experience." The intro of the video features a portion of its album interlude, "Life's No Fun Through Clear Waters", which is titled after one of the song's lyrics. Dazed ranked it as the best music video of 2025, commenting that it captures "navigating life as a troubled adolescent, existing in an imaginary, otherworldly realm by way of distraction" and is "the perfect visualiser for the phrase 'headphones in, world out'."

== Live performances ==
Rae performed the song for the first time at The Box sister venues in New York City and London during special live shows to celebrate the release of her debut album on June 5 and June 10, 2025, respectively. In April 2025, Katie Gavin performed a cover of "Headphones On" at Radio City Music Hall. Haim also recorded a cover of the song at BBC Radio 1's Live Lounge in June 2025. The song featured in the setlist of Rae's debut concert The Addison Tour in 2025.

== Charts ==
=== Weekly charts ===
Weekly chart performance for "Headphones On"
Chart (2025)	Peak position
Australia (ARIA)	82
Canada Hot 100 (Billboard)	73
Estonia Airplay (TopHit)	25
Global 200 (Billboard)	116
Greece International (IFPI)	83
Ireland (IRMA)	34
Japan Hot Overseas (Billboard Japan)	6
Lithuania Airplay (TopHit)	30
Malta Airplay (Radiomonitor)	17
New Zealand Hot Singles (RMNZ)	2
Norway (VG-lista)	94
Sweden Heatseeker (Sverigetopplistan)	16
UK Singles (Official Charts)	24
US Billboard Hot 100	87

=== Monthly charts ===
Monthly chart performance for "Headphones On"
Chart (2025)	Peak position
Estonia Airplay (TopHit)	62
Lithuania Airplay (TopHit)	59

== Certifications ==
Region	Certification	Certified units/sales
United Kingdom (BPI)	Silver	200,000^{‡}
^{‡} Sales+streaming figures based on certification alone.

== Release history ==
Release history for "Headphones On"
Region	Date	Format(s)	Label(s)	Ref.
Various	April 18, 2025	Digital download; streaming	Columbia; As Long As I'm Dancing	
United States	April 23, 2025	Contemporary hit radio	Columbia	
Italy	April 25, 2025	Radio airplay	Sony Italy	
