= Mel Ottenberg =

American fashion stylist and magazine editor (born 1976)

Editor-in-chief of Interview
- Incumbent
- Assumed office 2021

Personal details
- Born: April 25, 1976 (age 50)
- Occupation: Wardrobe stylist, magazine editor

Mel Ottenberg (born April 25, 1976) is an American wardrobe stylist and the editor-in-chief of Interview magazine. From 2011 to 2019, he worked as Rihanna's stylist and has styled numerous other high profile musicians, actresses, and celebrities. In 2024, he designed a unisex capsule collection with denim brand RE/DONE. He lives and works in New York, New York.

== Early life and education ==
Ottenberg grew up in Washington, D.C., and graduated from Edmund Burke School in Forrest Hills. His father, Ray, was a fourth-generation baker who ran the family-owned Ottenberg Bakery. Ottenberg's mother and stepfather were in custom publishing, designing magazines. He grew up as “culturally Jewish” and had a Marrakech-themed Bar Mitzvah. When he was young, he went to Corcoran every weekend to take drawing classes and painting classes. He said he was also inspired by copies of Vogue that his best friend's mom had lying around.

Later, in the early '90s, he snuck out to go to nightclubs in D.C., including Tracks and the Vault, where he could observe youth fashion. He was also inspired by celebrities like Madonna, Pat Benatar, and Grace Jones.

For college, he attended Rhode Island School of Design. He interned for designer Richard Tyler in summer 1995. After school, he moved to New York and worked for designer Katayone Adeli as a "trims guy." His dream was to be a fashion designer like Marc Jacobs.

== Career ==
=== Editorial and campaigns ===
Ottenberg's first-ever styled magazine feature was for The Face in 2001, which he styled primarily from his closet. From 2013 to 2018, he served as fashion director of 032c.

Ottenberg first worked with Interview magazine in 2010, interviewing Joan Rivers for an article. He then returned to Interview in 2018, when he became the magazine's creative director. His first story as creative director was the cover story featuring filmmaker Agnes Varda for the September 2018 "relaunch" of the magazine. Ottenberg was named editor-in-chief of Interview in 2021. In 2022, Ottenberg was named Daily Front Row’s editor-in-chief of the year.

During his career, he has collaborated with numerous photographers including Inez and Vinoodh, Mario Sorrenti, Steven Klein, Terry Richardson, Wong Kar-Wai, and Collier Schorr. His work has appeared in publications like Purple, Harper's Bazaar, Dazed & Confused. GQ, French Vogue, Rolling Stone and T.

His campaigns include Dior, Nike, Balenciaga, Diesel, Paris Texas, Poster Girl, Zara, Calvin Klein, Frame, Balmain, Gucci, Woolrich, and Tom Ford.

=== Collaborations with musicians and celebrities ===
In addition to fashion editorials and campaigns, he has worked extensively with musicians for projects such as Troye Sivan's "My My My!" music video, Addison Rae's Diet Pepsi and Aquamarine videos, Christina Aguilera's Hollywood Bowl performances,Björk's Vulnicura album cover, and Alicia Keys’ 2019 Grammy Awards hosting duties. He will also appear in The Moment, a mockumentary starring Charli xcx.

Ottenberg has also worked with many celebrities including Selena Gomez, Lana Del Rey, Justin Bieber, Chloë Sevigny, James Franco, Cate Blanchett, and Jennifer Aniston. He has also styled designer John Galliano.

=== Rihanna ===
Ottenberg first met Rihanna when he did a shoot with her for Elle, when she was a young artist. He officially became her stylist in 2011 on the Loud tour where he commissioned designers Jeremy Scott and Adam Selman, his boyfriend, to create costumes. Ottenberg considers the "We Found Love" video, released in 2011, to be their fashion breakthrough. This video included vintage pieces and items from little-known and emerging designers like Komakino and Forfex. On Rihanna's Diamonds tour, she wore custom pieces from Riccardo Tisci of Givenchy, Raf Simons, and Alber Elbaz of Lanvin. In 2015, he won a UK Music Video Award for "best styling in a video" for Rihanna's Bitch Better Have My Money video. He also served as a judge on Rihanna's short-lived reality show, Styled to Rock.

The first Met Gala look that he styled for Rihanna was in 2012 (where she wore a Tom Ford dress), and he went on to style her for several more Met Galas including 2014, 2015, 2017, and 2018. In 2014, Rihanna won the CFDA style icon award where she thanked Ottenberg in her speech, saying " Mel Ottenberg, thank you! You get me. You honestly get me, and you understand what I’m trying to say. I can send you two pictures, and you bring back the rack full of exactly what I wanted." Ottenberg styled Rihanna for that event, putting her in the “internet’s most talked about dress,” also called "the naked dress," designed by Adam Selman.

Ottenberg was known for creating a lot of custom looks for Rihanna. In an interview with the Nymphet Alumni podcast, Ottenberg described how he got Rihanna multiple pairs of the Manolo Blahnik "Chaos" shoe, a sample at the time, custom made in several colors. Rihanna later became known for wearing this shoe and eventually did a collaboration with Manolo Blahnik. Ottenberg stopped styling for Rihanna in 2019, but they remain friends. He styled and interviewed her for the spring 2024 cover of Interview.

=== Design collaborations ===
In 2024, Ottenberg partnered with denim brand RE/DONE to release “Mel by RE/DONE,” a capsule collection of clothing pieces that were inspired by Ottenberg’s pair of Levi's 505 jeans from the 1980s that he purchased from a vintage store. The collection is unisex and includes the Mel jean in medium blue and light acid wash, a trucker jacket, the Club Mel graphic tee, and a selection of upcycled Levi's 505. The items range in price from $175 to $495. The collection also focuses on sustainability, with some items (including the jacket and jeans) being made from 100% organic cotton and graphic tees made from 30% recycled cotton using tubular construction. Model and actress Emily Ratajkowski endorsed the jeans on her social media.
