= Addison Rae =

American singer (born 2000)

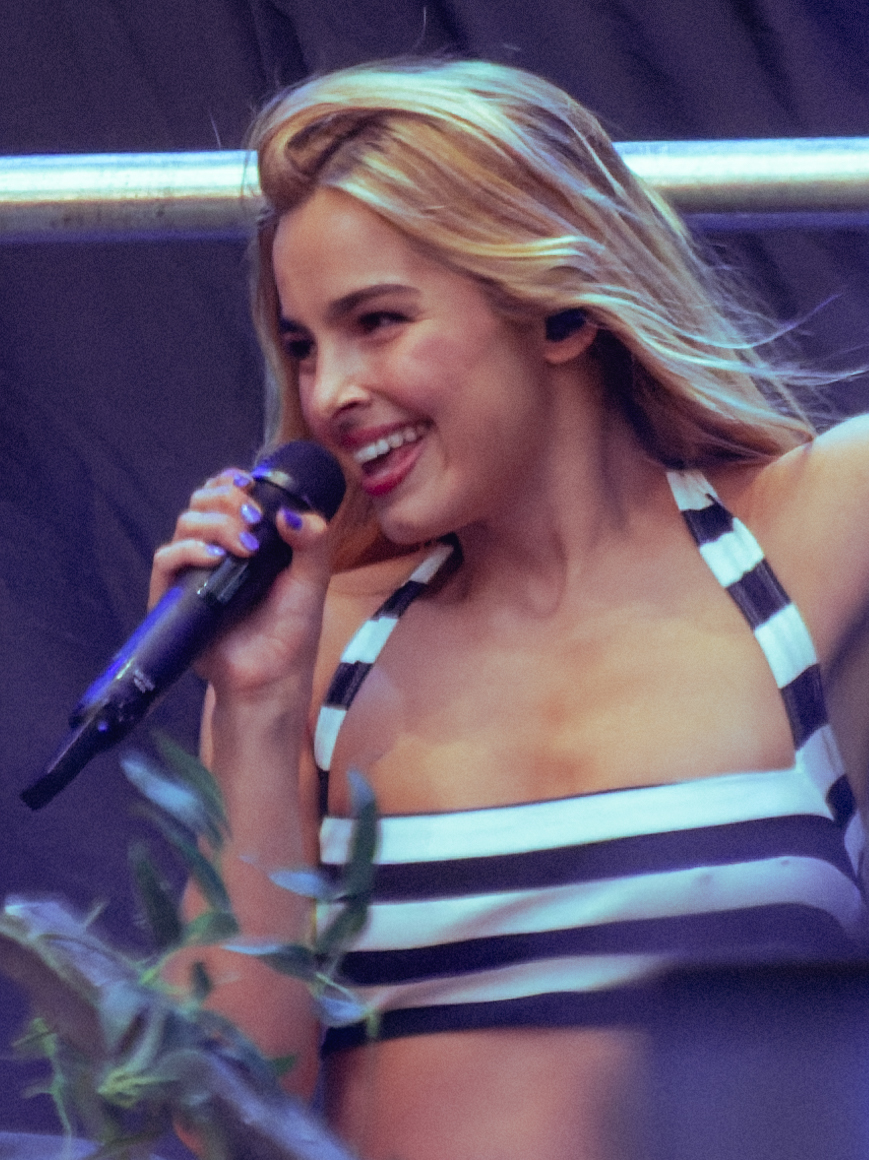
- Rae in 2025
- Born: Addison Rae Easterling; October 6, 2000 (age 26); Lafayette, Louisiana, U.S.
- Education: Louisiana State University
- Occupations: Singer; actress; social media personality
- Years active: 2019–present
- Father: Monty Lopez
- Musical career
- Genre: Pop
- Instrument: Vocals
- Labels: Sandlot; Columbia
- Website: addisonrae.com

TikTok information
- Page: addisonre
- Followers: 87.7M
- Last updated: October 29, 2026

Addison Rae Easterling (born October 6, 2000) is an American singer, actress, and social media personality. Rae first gained recognition as one of TikTok's most-followed creators, before expanding her career into music and acting. She released her debut single, "Obsessed" in 2021, followed by her debut extended play (EP), AR (2023). She also starred in the Netflix film He's All That (2021) and the slasher film Thanksgiving (2023).

After signing with Columbia Records in 2024, Rae released her first major-label single, "Diet Pepsi", which marked her first entry on the US Billboard Hot 100. Her debut studio album, Addison (2025), debuted at number four on the Billboard 200 and earned her a Grammy Award nomination for Best New Artist.

== Early life and education ==
Addison Rae Easterling (Note: Although she was given her mother's maiden name at birth, Monty Lopez is her biological father.) was born on October 6, 2000, and raised in Lafayette, Louisiana, to parents Monty Lopez and Sheri Easterling. Rae has two younger brothers, Enzo Lopez and Lucas Lopez, and an older half-sister, Macye Neumeyer, who has two daughters of her own. Through her father, she is of mixed descent, including Mexican, Cajun French, and English ancestry; her paternal grandfather is of Mexican descent, making her one-quarter Mexican, while her mother is of European descent. Rae's parents initially divorced when she was younger and were on and off often throughout her childhood, before remarrying in 2017, later divorcing again in 2022.

Rae started dancing competitively at age six where she attended competitions across the country. Before moving to Los Angeles to pursue her career, she briefly attended Louisiana State University (LSU) where she studied broadcast journalism in the fall to become a sports broadcaster but then dropped out when she began to gain popularity on TikTok. In an interview with Elle magazine, Rae talked about her choice to move to Los Angeles, saying: "a few people in LA reached out to me, and I was like 'I need to go. I need to go.' So my parents supported me fully."

== Career ==
=== 2019–2023: Social media fame and career beginnings ===
Rae joined the social media app TikTok in July 2019, uploading dance videos to trending songs on the platform. Within a few months, Rae gained over one million followers on the app, leaving LSU in November. She joined the TikTok collective The Hype House in December 2019 for a brief period of time. As of May 2026, she has amassed over 88 million followers on the app. She later signed with talent agency WME in January 2020. In July, Rae released a weekly Spotify-exclusive podcast alongside her mother, Mama Knows Best, covering their personal and career lives. Rae later relaunched this podcast under the name That Was Fun?.

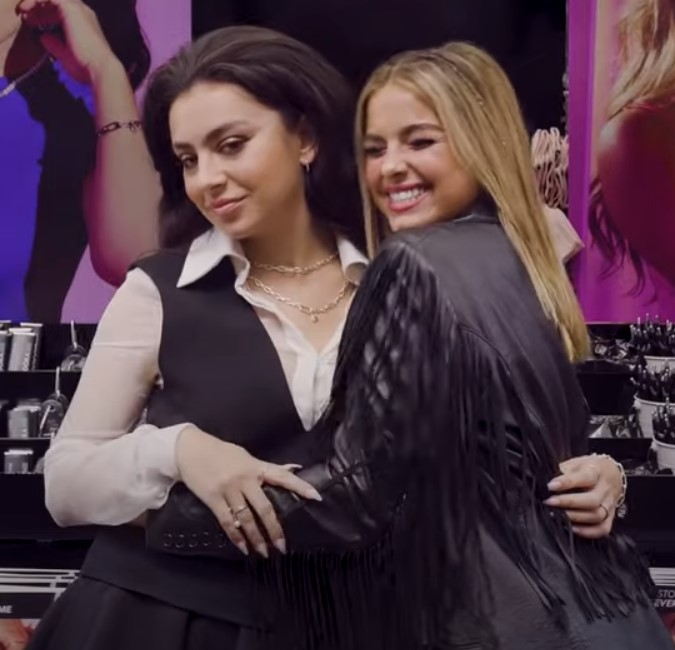
Rae (right) with British singer Charli XCX (left) in 2021

In March 2021, Rae released her debut single, "Obsessed". The single was intended to be the lead single for her then-upcoming project but was temporarily shelved. That same year, Rae launched her own cosmetics line, Item Beauty, but it discontinued in 2023. Rae also founded her own fragrance line. In August, Rae made her feature film debut as Padgett in the Netflix comedy film He's All That (2021), a remake film of the 1999 teen comedy She's All That. The film was the most streamed film on its release week.

In February 2022, it was announced that Rae had joined the cast of a film titled Fashionista, produced by Paramount. That same month, multiple songs from her unreleased EP leaked on YouTube, which Rae initially thought "could mark the death knell for her music career". However, the tracks gained traction online, which spurred her to release her debut extended play AR on August 18, 2023. The EP received generally positive reviews, and debuted at number 19 on the US Billboard Heatseekers Albums chart. In November, Rae appeared as Gaby in the slasher film Thanksgiving (2023).

=== 2024–present: Musical breakthrough with Addison ===
In March 2024, Rae featured on Charli XCX's remix of "Von Dutch" which went on to appear on Charli XCX's remix album Brat and It's Completely Different but Also Still Brat (2024). Rae also appeared on A. G. Cook's album Britpop (2024) on a song titled "Lucifer" with Charli XCX. In August 2024, Addison Rae released her first major label single, "Diet Pepsi", through Columbia Records. The song was commercially successful. It went on to peak at number 54 on the US Billboard Hot 100 marking Rae's first entry. Rae performed the song live at Madison Square Garden with Troye Sivan and Charli XCX on the Sweat tour. In October 2024, Rae released the single "Aquamarine". A remix of the song with Arca was released a month later.

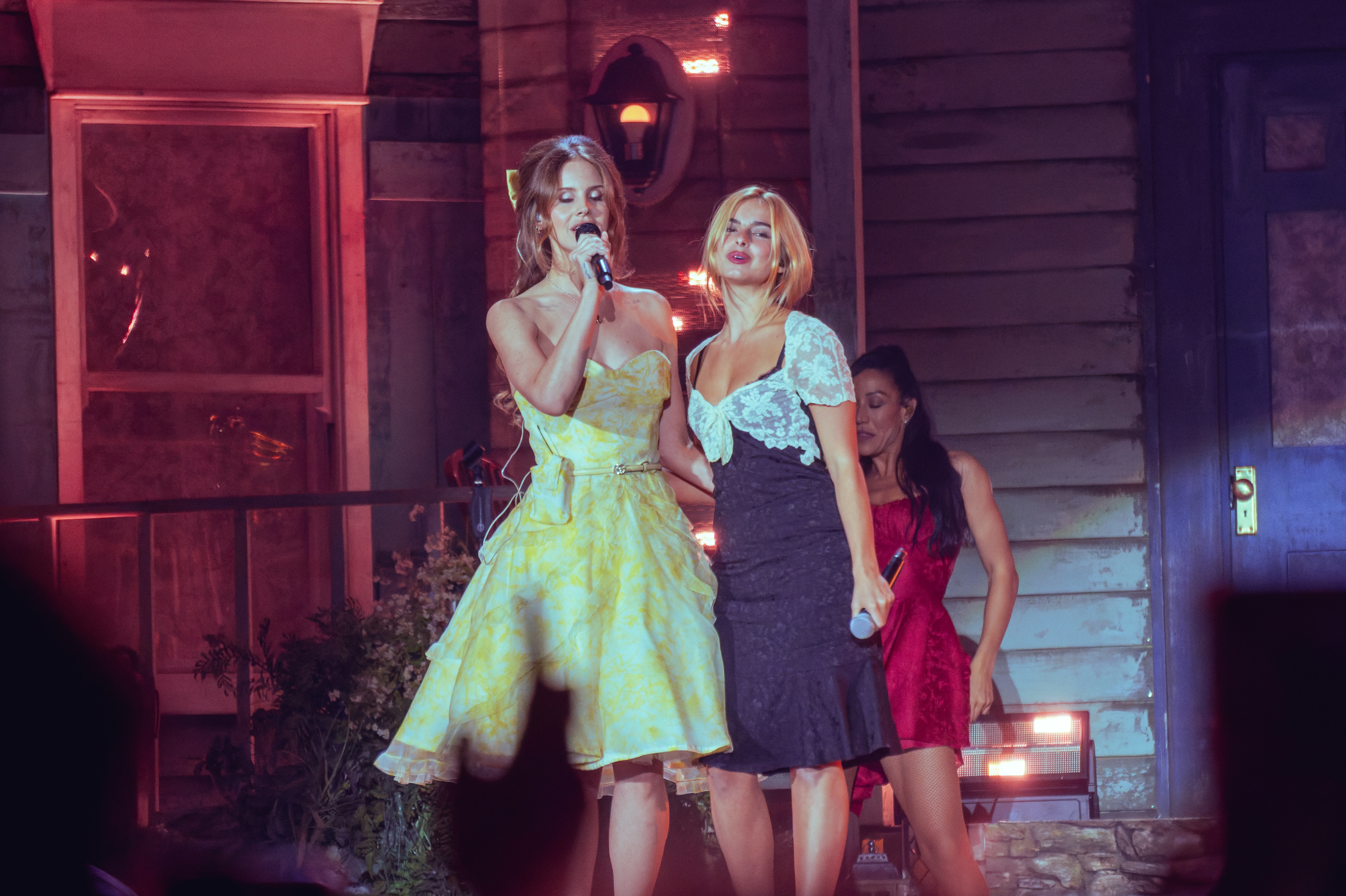
Rae with Lana Del Rey

In February 2025, Rae released the single "High Fashion" and its accompanying music video. Following the single's release, she was featured on the cover of Vogue France. In April, Rae performed "Aquamarine / Arcamarine" at Coachella with Arca. Rae's debut album, Addison, was released on June 6, 2025, and was preceded by the release of the additional singles "Headphones On" and "Fame Is a Gun". The album found widespread success, debuting at number four on the Billboard 200. It sold 48,500 album-equivalent units in its first week, consisting of 23,000 pure album sales and 25,500 streaming equivalent album units from 33 million streams. Rae celebrated the release of Addison with a live concert at New York City's The Box. The concert was produced in partnership with Spotify.

From August through November 2025, Rae embarked on her first headlining tour, The Addison Tour, with shows in Europe, North America and Australia. In August 2025, Rae was invited to perform at a spotlight event hosted by the Grammy Museum. She was invited back again in October 2025 for another event with the museum's audience. In October 2025, Rae appeared on The Tonight Show with Jimmy Fallon, performing "Diet Pepsi" wearing a sparkling gold gown first worn by the burlesque star Gypsy Rose Lee in the 1950s. She appeared in the third season of Netflix's biographical crime drama anthology television series Monster: The Ed Gein Story as Evelyn Hartley.

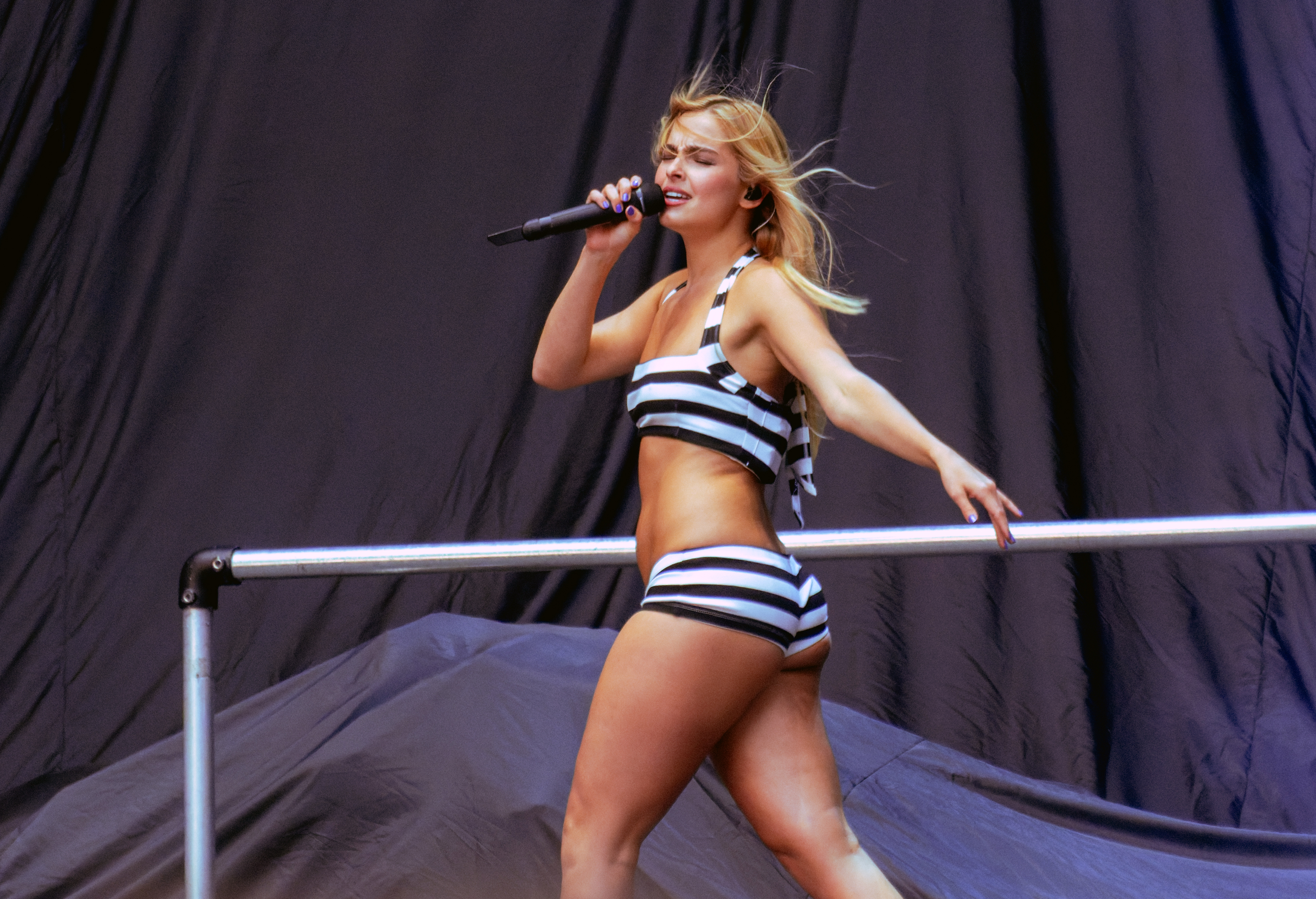
Rae performing as an opening act for Lana Del Rey at Wembley Stadium in July 2025

In November 2025, she was nominated for Best New Artist at the 2026 68th Annual Grammy Awards where she also performed "Fame Is a Gun" as part of a medley along with the other nominees in the Best New Artist category. With her nomination, she was invited to join the Recording Academy new member class, along with other Best New Artist nominee, Katseye, and comedian Nikki Glaser, back in July of 2025. In December 2025, Rae was named artist of the year by The Guardian, while Addison was named the best album of 2025 by The Washington Post and The Fader. In January 2026, Rae performed at Spotify's 2026 Best New Artist Party. In March 2026, she performed at South American editions of Lollapalooza, including the festivals in Chile, Argentina, and Brazil. Rae performed on the main stage at Coachella in April 2026, bringing out special guests Maddie Ziegler and Olivia Rodrigo. Rae appeared at Madonna's surprise performance in West Hollywood in April 2026.

Rae will star in the live-action animated road comedy film Animal Friends alongside Ryan Reynolds and Aubrey Plaza, which is set to be released on January 22, 2027.

== Artistry ==
=== Influences ===
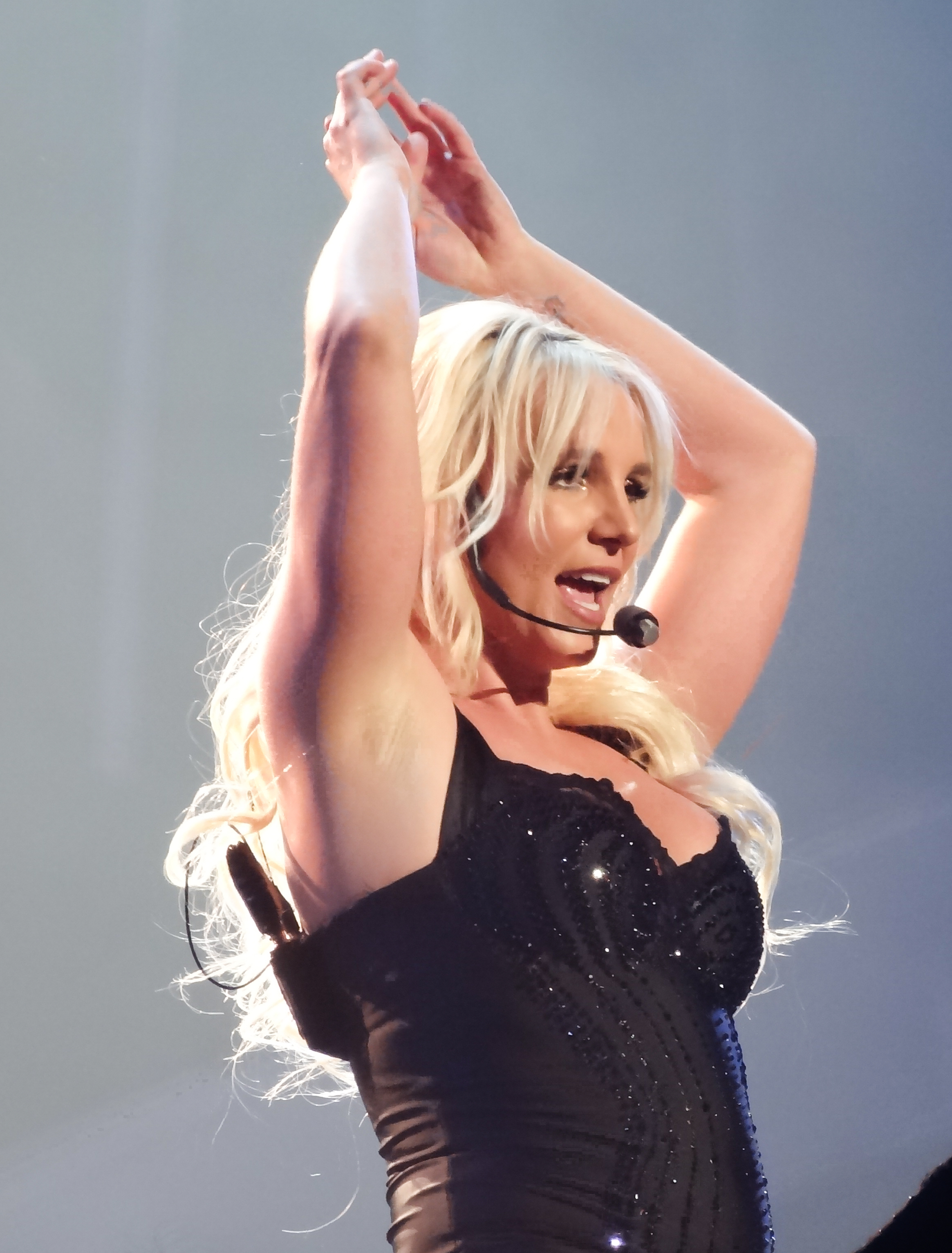
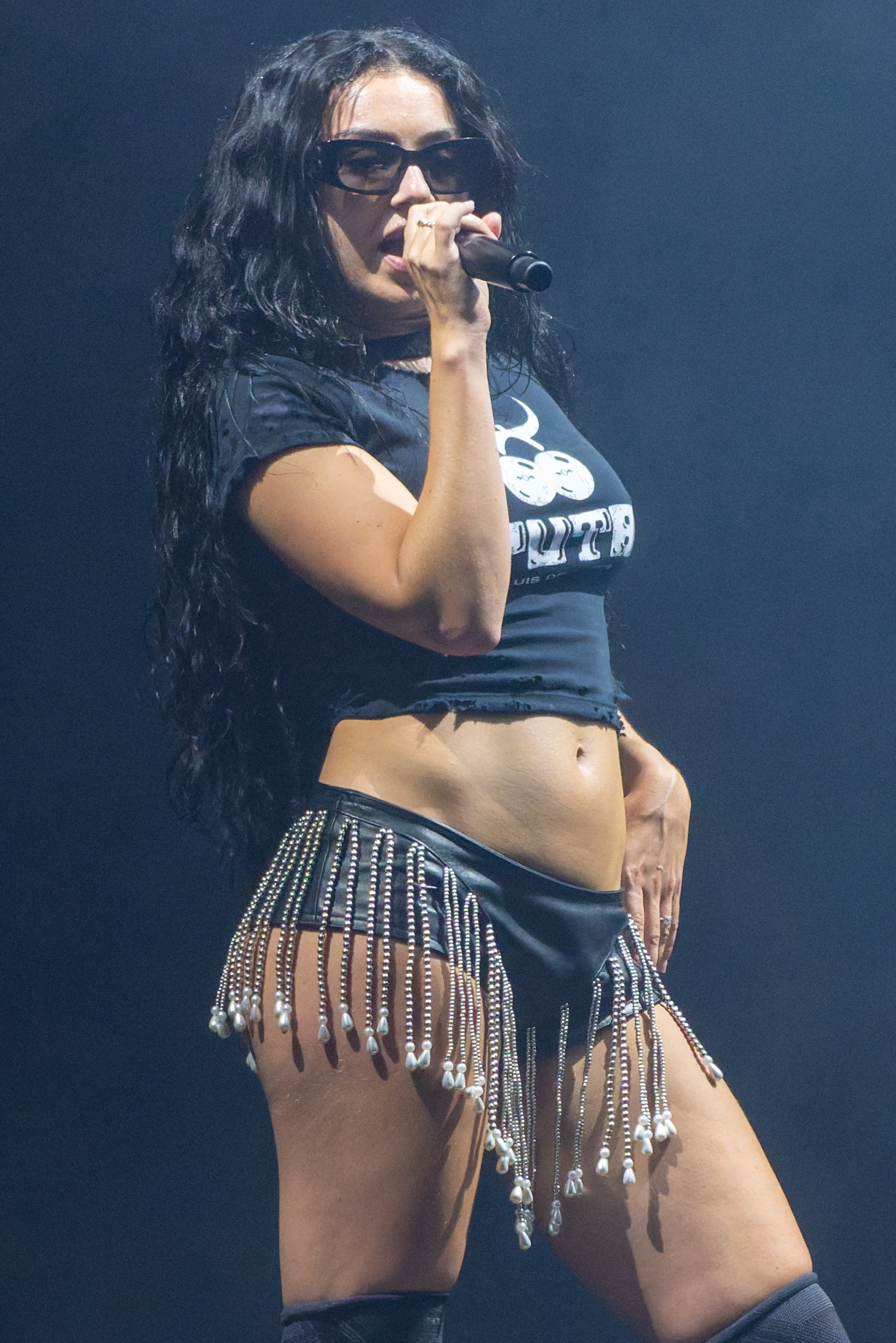
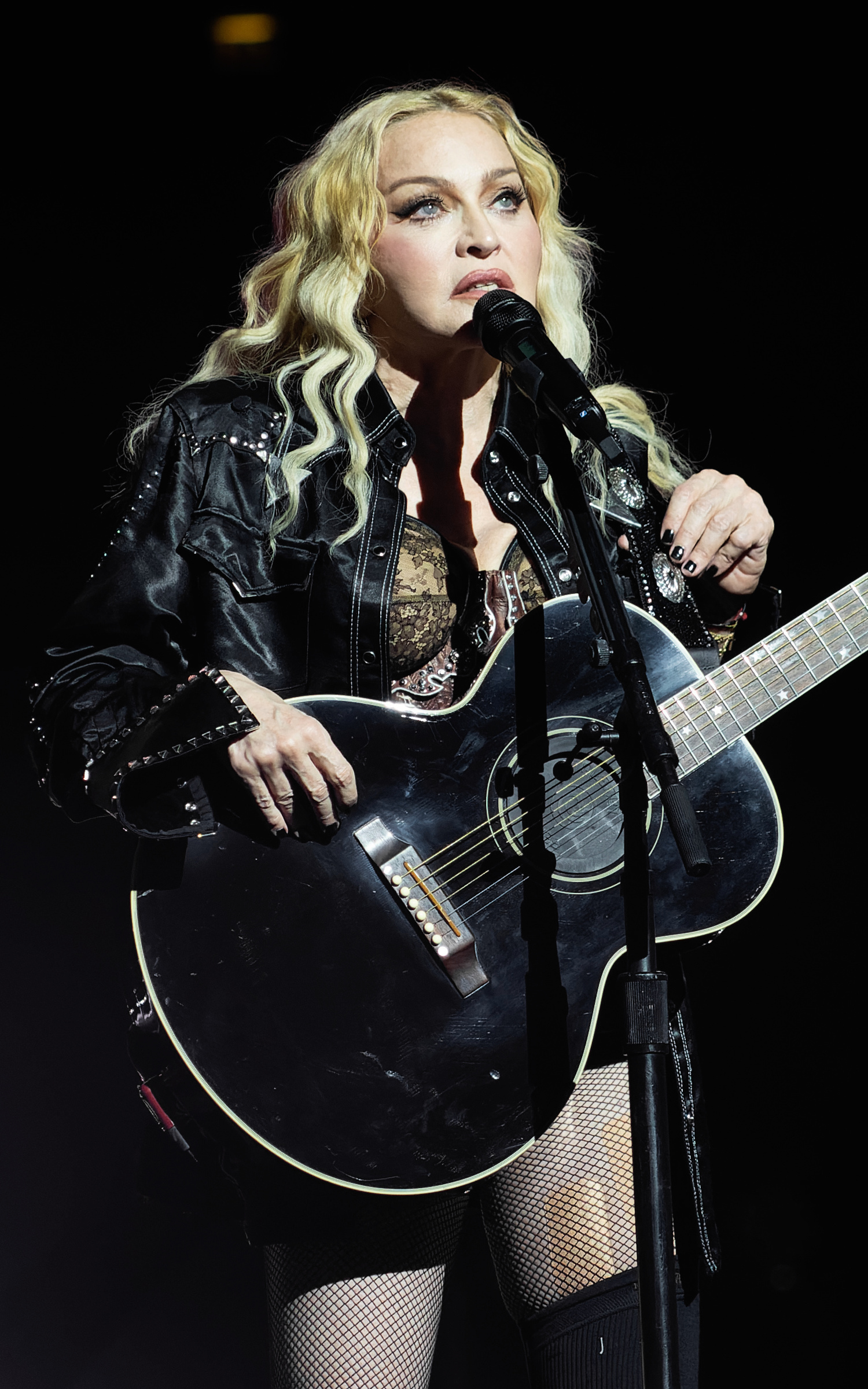
Rae credits artists such as (left to right) Britney Spears, Charli XCX, and Madonna as major musical influences.

In a conversation with Interview magazine editor-in-chief Mel Ottenberg, Rae mused on her influences saying, "I love a woman who does it all [...] I love a girl that does it all with no filter, it's just ingrained in me". She has been compared to American singer Britney Spears, and has cited Spears as one of her biggest influences and a "huge part of [her] life". Rae's vocals have also been positively compared to Spears' and have been described as "breathy". She also cited Charli XCX, Madonna and Barbra Streisand as influences. Rae and Spears were featured on Paper magazine's "List of Music Mother and Daughters". During an interview for her debut single "Obsessed", she identified Beyoncé, Jennifer Lopez, Katy Perry, Taylor Swift, and Spears as some of her musical influences.

=== Musical style ===
Rae retrospectively described her early music as "messy". Despite this initial reception, Gold Derby writer Jaime Rodriguez noted that Rae "managed to reset the narrative" and relaunched her musical style, establishing herself as a "legit music artist". Post 2021, she began to utilize synth-pop and electropop sounds within her music. Rodriguez cited Rae's "nonexistent presence on social media" and associating herself with artists such as Charli XCX and Lana Del Rey as contributing factors for her rebrand. Vogue writer Larisha Paul also noted Rae's unexpectedly eclectic taste in music for artists such as FKA Twigs, Yves Tumor and Kelela, and genres such as avant-garde hip-hop music and 2000s Timbaland-produced R&B. Paul opined that they were key to her success. Rae herself acknowledged in a trailer video for her debut album Addison, that she is "not the same person you used to know," alluding to her musical rebrand.

Rae has also embraced a 1990s and Y2K aesthetic with high-saturated photoshoots. Her debut album's cover was described as an homage to 'Y2K It girls' including Hilary Duff and Christina Aguilera. In an interview with W magazine, she noted that for her first label meeting with Columbia Records she brought a binder filled with printed photos, colors, and words prior to the release of her then-unreleased debut album which "existed purely as a collection of visions, visuals, and words". The Independent writer Felicity Martin noted that Rae's music "balances pop, past and present but never feels too try-hard".

== Public image ==
Rae has featured on the covers of several fashion and entertainment magazines including Glamour, Rolling Stone, Vogue France, Elle, Billboard, and W.

Rae has been referenced and referred to in the media multiple times, mentioned in songs and having appeared in music videos. In March 2020, Australian rapper the Kid Laroi released the song "Addison Rae", which was named after Rae and went viral on social media. Followed by this, Rae appeared in Lil Mosey's "Blueberry Faygo" music video. Later that year, Rae was mentioned by rapper Lil Yachty on his song "E-ER", which sparked a feud between him and Rae's then–boyfriend, Bryce Hall. Rae appeared in a Nerds Gummy Clusters commercial that aired during Super Bowl LVIII.

In November 2024, she also starred in Saint Laurent's campaign short film As Time Goes By, directed by Nadia Lee Cohen alongside Chloë Sevigny, Joey King, John Waters amongst others. Rae has since been credited, alongside other celebrities such as Ice Spice and Billie Eilish, with the revival of the navel piercing in the 2020s, as well as with contributing to renewed interest in wired headphones, and Y2K-influenced fashion. In July 2025, Rae made an appearance in Sombr's '70s-inspired music video for his song "12 to 12". Rae appeared in an Uber Eats commercial for Super Bowl LX, alongside Bradley Cooper and Matthew McConaughey, with the advertisement featuring Diet Pepsi. Rae's 2026 purple Grammys performance outfit is highlighted at the Grammy's Museum 'On The Red Carpet' exhibit.

== Other activities ==
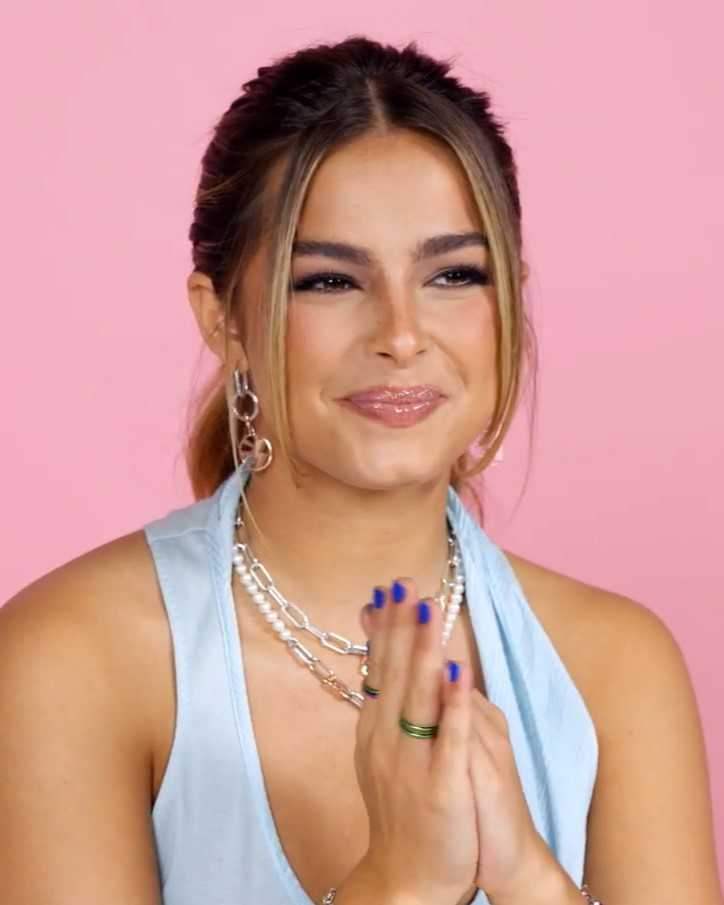
Rae promoting Pandora in 2021

=== Business ventures and endorsements ===
Rae has partnered with various companies such as Pandora (in collaboration with Charli XCX), L'Oréal, Lululemon, Reebok, and YSL Beauty. Rae has an estimated net worth of $25 million, earning over $5 million in 2020. She was also included as a limited-time playable character in the mobile video game War of the Visions: Final Fantasy Brave Exvius in November 2022.

In 2020, Rae co-founded Item Beauty, a cosmetics and skincare brand; the brand was discontinued by 2023. In 2021, Rae started her own fragrance line Addison Rae Fragrance which featured several water-based, alcohol-free scents. In 2022, Rae partnered with Alani Nu to make her own energy drink flavor, 'Berry Pop'.

In November 2024, Rae was later the face of the Marc Jacobs x Vaquera bag collab; a Y2K-inspired bag in celebration of Marc Jacobs' 40th Anniversary. On the day of the release of her debut album Addison, Rae partnered with Matchaful in New York City with a special drink, "Summer Forever", given to the first 50 guests in line. In August 2025, Rae announced a collaboration with Lucky Brand. The partnership debuted with the Addison Ultra Low Rise Flare, a style inspired by early 2000s fashion. Rae had already been wearing the jeans during her live performances leading up to the launch. Together, Rae and Lucky Brand set out to "bring back the Y2K aesthetic with the goal of turning low-rise skeptics into believers." In March 2026, Rae and Lucky Brand added to their partnership by launching the Addison Ultra Low Short.

=== Activism and politics ===
In January 2021, Rae donated her $1 million in prize money from winning an all-star Mario Tennis Aces tournament called the Stay At Home Slam to the charity No Kid Hungry. In January 2022, Rae joined the campaign for The American Cancer Society. In April 2025, Rae joined Troye Sivan, Pedro Pascal, and more in showing her support of trans rights with a viral t-shirt that has raised tens of thousands of dollars for a nonprofit dedicated to the trans community. The following month, Rae signed a full-page Planned Parenthood ad calling for support of the organization's lifesaving healthcare initiatives in response to threats under current President Donald Trump. Later that June, she voiced her support of anti-Immigration and Customs Enforcement (ICE) protests, writing in an Instagram post, "This country could not exist without immigrants."

Rae endorsed Kamala Harris in the 2024 presidential election. In a 2025 interview with Vogue France, Rae said that Trump had "created the problem" of TikTok's ban in the United States and, in reference to his second presidency, that it was "unbelievable to see how quickly one can abuse a newly acquired power."

In April 2026, Rae filed a copyright claim against the US Department of Homeland Security after her song, "Diet Pepsi," was used in a recruitment video for ICE posted to X (formerly Twitter). The video was removed in response to "a report from the copyright owner."

== Personal life ==
In October 2020, Rae confirmed she was in a relationship with social media personality Bryce Hall; however, they ended their relationship the following year. In June 2021, Rae was reported to be dating Omer Fedi, a Los Angeles–based musician and producer. The couple separated around October 2025 after four years together, with reports indicating that the split was amicable and that Rae chose to focus on her career.

In 2024, Rae cited the most "underrated thing about herself was [her] ability to evolve and transform." She also stated "People like to say, “Her PR team is working overtime on the rebrand.” And I’m like, “Girl, nobody’s rebranding. This is me."

In 2025, Rae discussed stepping back from social media, explaining that she had "felt so misunderstood" after "sharing so much" of herself online and had come to value her privacy, noting that "privacy becomes really important over time." She said that "being misunderstood is definitely annoying", but has learned not to take criticism personally, reflecting that when she moved to Los Angeles at 19, she was still "figuring out who [she] was". In an interview with Rolling Stone, Rae disclosed she has ADHD.

== Discography ==
=== Studio albums ===
List of studio albums, with selected details and chart positions
| Title | Details | Peak chart positions | | | | | | | | | | Certifications |
| Title | Details | US | AUS | AUT | BEL | CAN | IRE | NOR | NZ | SWI | UK | Certifications |
|---|---|---|---|---|---|---|---|---|---|---|---|---|
| Addison | Released: June 6, 2025; Label: Columbia, As Long As I'm Dancing; Formats: CD, digital download, LP, streaming | 4 | 2 | 9 | 3 | 6 | 2 | 10 | 1 | 8 | 2 | RIAA: Gold; BPI: Silver; RMNZ: Gold |

=== Extended plays ===
List of extended plays, with selected details and chart positions
| Title | Details | Peak chart positions | |
| Title | Details | US Heat. | US Sales |
|---|---|---|---|
| AR | Released: August 18, 2023; Label: Sandlot; Formats: CD, digital download, LP, streaming | 19 | 45 |

=== Singles ===
List of singles, showing year released, selected chart positions and associated albums
| Title | Year | Peak chart positions | | | | | | | | | | Certifications | Album |
| Title | Year | US | AUS | CAN | GRE | IRE | NZ | SWE | SWI | UK | WW | Certifications | Album |
|---|---|---|---|---|---|---|---|---|---|---|---|---|---|
| "Obsessed" | 2021 | — (Note: "Obsessed" did not enter the Billboard Hot 100, but peaked at number ten on the Bubbling Under Hot 100 chart.) | — | 74 | — | 64 | — (Note: "Obsessed" did not enter the NZ Top 40 Singles Chart, but peaked at number 15 on the NZ Hot Singles Chart.) | — | — | — (Note: "Obsessed" did not enter the UK Singles Chart, but peaked at number nine on the UK Independent Singles Breakers Chart.) | — | | AR |
| "Diet Pepsi" | 2024 | 54 | 18 | 39 | 39 | 7 | 17 | 92 | 65 | 10 | 35 | RIAA: Platinum; ARIA: Platinum; BPI: Platinum; GLF: Gold; MC: 2× Platinum; RMNZ: Platinum | Addison |
| "Aquamarine" | 2024 | — (Note: "Aquamarine" did not enter the Billboard Hot 100, but peaked at number ten on the Bubbling Under Hot 100 chart.) | — | — | 70 | 47 | — (Note: "Aquamarine" did not enter the NZ Top 40 Singles Chart, but peaked at number eight on the NZ Hot Singles Chart.) | — | — | 45 | — | | Addison |
| "High Fashion" | 2025 | — (Note: "High Fashion" did not enter the Billboard Hot 100, but peaked at number eleven on the Hot Dance/Pop Songs chart.) | — | — | — | 73 | — (Note: "High Fashion" did not enter the NZ Top 40 Singles Chart, but peaked at number nine on the NZ Hot Singles Chart.) | — | — | 69 | — | | Addison |
| "Headphones On" | 2025 | 87 | 82 | 73 | 83 | 34 | — (Note: "Headphones On" did not enter the NZ Top 40 Singles Chart, but peaked at number 2 on the NZ Hot Singles Chart.) | — (Note: "Headphones On" did not enter the Swedish Singellista Chart, but peaked at number 16 on the Swedish Heatseeker Chart.) | — | 24 | 116 | BPI: Silver | Addison |
| "Fame Is a Gun" | 2025 | 73 | 36 | 56 | 84 | 16 | 24 | — (Note: "Fame Is a Gun" did not enter the Swedish Singellista Chart, but peaked at number 2 on the Swedish Heatseeker Chart.) | — | 23 | 61 | RIAA: Platinum; ARIA: Platinum; BPI: Gold; MC: Platinum; RMNZ: Platinum | Addison |
"—" denotes a recording that did not chart or was not released in that territory.

==== Promotional singles ====
List of promotional singles, showing year released, selected chart positions and associated albums
| Title | Year | Peak chart positions | Album |
| Title | Year | NZ Hot | Album |
|---|---|---|---|
| "Von Dutch" (Remix) (Charli XCX featuring Addison Rae and A. G. Cook) | 2024 | 25 | Brat and It's Completely Different but Also Still Brat |

=== Other charted songs ===
List of songs, showing year released, selected chart positions and associated albums
| Title | Year | Peak chart positions | | | | Album |
| Title | Year | US Dance/ Pop | IRE | NZ Hot | UK | Album |
|---|---|---|---|---|---|---|
| "I Got It Bad" | 2023 | — | — | 31 | — | AR |
| "2 Die 4" (featuring Charli XCX) | 2023 | — | 67 | 13 | — | AR |
| "New York" | 2025 | 6 | 58 | 4 | 61 | Addison |
| "Money Is Everything" | 2025 | — | — | 8 | — | Addison |
| "In the Rain" | 2025 | 14 | — | — | — | Addison |
| "Times Like These" | 2025 | — | — | 7 | — | Addison |
"—" denotes a recording that did not chart or was not released in that territory.

=== Guest appearances ===
List of non-single guest appearances, with other performing artists, showing year released and album name
| Title | Year | Other artist(s) | Album |
|---|---|---|---|
| "Lucifer" | 2024 | A. G. Cook, Charli XCX | Britpop |

== Filmography ==
=== Film ===
Key
| † | Denotes films that have not yet been released |

| Year | Title | Role | Notes | Ref. |
|---|---|---|---|---|
| 2020 | Spy Cat | Marnie (voice) | English dub | |
| 2021 | He's All That | Padgett Sawyer | | |
| 2023 | Thanksgiving | Gaby | | |
| 2024 | As Time Goes By | Singer | Short film | |
| 2027 | Animal Friends † | TBA | Post-production | |

=== Television ===
| Year | Title | Role | Notes | Ref. |
|---|---|---|---|---|
| 2020 | 2020 Billboard Music Awards | Presenter | | |
| 2020 | 46th People's Choice Awards | Presenter | | |
| 2020 | Top Elf | Guest judge | Season 2, episode 1 | |
| 2021 | 2021 Kids' Choice Awards | Presenter | | |
| 2021 | Keeping Up with the Kardashians | Herself | Season 20, episodes 4 & 6 | |
| 2022 | Addison Rae Goes Home | Herself | Snapchat docuseries | |
| 2023 | The Kardashians | Herself | Season 3, episode 9 | |
| 2024 | 2024 MTV Video Music Awards | Presenter | | |
| 2025 | Monster: The Ed Gein Story | Evelyn Hartley | Guest star, 2 episodes | |
| 2026 | Kevin | Cat (voice) | Guest star, 1 episode | |

=== Music videos ===
| Year | Title | Other artist | Director(s) | Ref. |
As lead artist
| 2021 | "Obsessed" | None | Diane Martel | |
| 2024 | "Diet Pepsi" | None | Sean Price Williams | |
| 2024 | "Aquamarine" | None | Sean Price Williams | |
| 2024 | "Aquamarine / Arcamarine" | None | Lexee Smith | |
| 2025 | "High Fashion" | None | Mitch Ryan | |
| 2025 | "Headphones On" | None | Mitch Ryan | |
| 2025 | "Fame Is a Gun" | None | Sean Price Williams | |
| 2025 | "Times Like These" | None | Ethan James Green | |
Guest appearances
| 2020 | "Blueberry Faygo" | Lil Mosey | Cole Bennett | |
| 2020 | "Canceled" | Larray | JakeTheShooter; Larray | |
| 2023 | "You Only Love Me" | Rita Ora | Charlie Sarsfield | |
| 2025 | "12 to 12" | Sombr | Gus Black | |

=== Video games ===
| Year | Title | Role | Ref |
|---|---|---|---|
| 2022 | War of the Visions: Final Fantasy Brave Exvius | Herself (likeness) | |
| 2026 | Fortnite | Herself (likeness) | |

== Awards and nominations ==
| Organization | Year | Category | Recipient | Result | Ref. |
|---|---|---|---|---|---|
| Berlin Commercial Festival | 2025 | Craft: Colour Grading | "High Fashion" | Nominated | |
| BMI Pop Awards | 2026 | Most-Performed Songs of the Year | "Diet Pepsi" | Won | |
| Bravo Otto Awards | 2021 | Social Media Star | Herself | Nominated | |
| BreakTudo Awards | 2020 | International TikTok Star | Herself | Nominated | |
| BreakTudo Awards | 2021 | International TikTok Star | Herself | Nominated | |
| BreakTudo Awards | 2024 | Anthem of the Year | "Diet Pepsi" | Nominated | |
| BreakTudo Awards | 2025 | International Artist on the Rise | Herself | Nominated | |
| Clio Awards | 2025 | Music Video | "Diet Pepsi" | Nominated | |
| Clio Awards | 2026 | Direction | "High Fashion" | Nominated | |
| Dork Readers' Poll Awards | 2025 | Album of the Year | Addison | Nominated | |
| Dork Readers' Poll Awards | 2025 | Breakthrough Act | Herself | Won | |
| European Festival Awards | 2026 | Newcomer of the Year | Herself | Won | |
| Grammy Awards | 2026 | Best New Artist | Herself | Nominated | |
| Hollywood Music Video Awards | 2026 | Best Color Grading | "High Fashion" | Won | |
| iHeartRadio Music Awards | 2026 | Favorite Debut Album | Addison | Nominated | |
| Las Culturistas Culture Awards | 2025 | Record of the Year | "Diet Pepsi" | Nominated | |
| Las Culturistas Culture Awards | 2026 | Record of the Year | "Fame Is a Gun" | Nominated | |
| Las Culturistas Culture Awards | 2026 | The Las Cultch 30 Under 30 | Herself | Nominated | |
| MTV MIAW Awards | 2022 | Global Creator | Herself | Nominated | |
| MTV Movie & TV Awards | 2021 | Breakthrough Social Star | Herself | Nominated | |
| MTV Video Music Awards | 2025 | Song of Summer | "Headphones On" | Nominated | |
| Nickelodeon Kids' Choice Awards | 2021 | Favorite Female Social Star | Herself | Nominated | |
| Nickelodeon Kids' Choice Awards | 2022 | Favorite Female Creator | Herself | Nominated | |
| Nickelodeon Kids' Choice Awards | 2022 | Favorite Social Music Star | Herself | Nominated | |
| Nickelodeon Kids' Choice Awards | 2023 | Favorite Female Creator | Herself | Nominated | |
| Nickelodeon Kids' Choice Awards | 2024 | Favorite Social Music Star | Herself | Nominated | |
| Nickelodeon Kids' Choice Awards | 2025 | Favorite Viral Song | "Diet Pepsi" | Nominated | |
| Nickelodeon Kids' Choice Awards | 2025 | Favorite Female Breakout Artist | Herself | Nominated | |
| New Music Awards | 2026 | New Top40/CHR Artist/Group of the Year | Herself | Nominated | |
| Nylon Nights Awards | 2025 | Best Debut Tour | The Addison Tour | Won | |
| People's Choice Awards | 2020 | The Social Star of 2020 | Herself | Nominated | |
| People's Choice Awards | 2021 | The Social Star of 2021 | Herself | Nominated | |
| People's Choice Awards | 2022 | The Social Star of 2022 | Herself | Nominated | |
| RTHK International Pop Poll Awards | 2025 | Top Female Singers | Herself | Nominated | |
| RTHK International Pop Poll Awards | 2025 | Top Ten International Gold Songs | "Headphones On" | Won | |
| Streamy Awards | 2020 | Creator of the Year | Herself | Nominated | |
| Streamy Awards | 2020 | Breakout Creator | Herself | Nominated | |
| Streamy Awards | 2021 | Creator of the Year | Herself | Nominated | |
| Streamy Awards | 2021 | Lifestyle Creator | Herself | Won | |
| Streamy Awards | 2022 | Creator of the Year | Herself | Nominated | |
| UK Music Video Awards | 2025 | Best Pop / R&B / Soul / Jazz Video – Newcomer | "Aquamarine" | Nominated | |
| UK Music Video Awards | 2025 | Best Pop Video – International | "High Fashion" | Nominated | |
| Variety Hitmakers Awards | 2025 | The Future Is Female Award | Herself, Elvira Anderfjärd and Luka Kloser | Won | |

== Tours ==
Headlining

- The Addison Tour (2025)

Supporting

- Lana Del Rey – UK and Ireland Tour (2025)

== See also ==
- List of most-followed TikTok accounts
