= Hollywood Music Video Awards =

American music award

- Awarded for: Music video achievements
- Country: United States
- First award: 2025; 1 year ago
- Website: hollymusicvideoawards.com

The Hollywood Music Video Awards (HMVAs) is an annual international festival and awards ceremony held in Los Angeles, California, dedicated to honoring outstanding creative achievement in music videos. Unlike awards programs that focus primarily on recording artists, the HMVAs center on the craftspeople behind the camera, including directors, cinematographers, editors, production designers, choreographers, stylists, and visual effects artists. The awards are submission-based and cover both popular and technical categories, including Music Video of the Year, Director of the Year, Producer of the Year, Best Acting, Best Cinematography, Best Editing, Best Pop, Best International and Best Low Budget.

The first ceremony was hosted by Max Goodrich and took place on April 5, 2025, at the W Hollywood hotel in Hollywood, California, with American music video, commercial and film director Dave Meyers in attendance.

== History ==
=== Founding ===
The Hollywood Music Video Awards were founded by Danny Pollack and Abi Perl, with the first ceremony held in 2025. Pollack, who serves as the organization's president, had previously founded Dojohouse Media Group in 2019, a Los Angeles-based production company and creative collective specializing in music video and album-driven visual storytelling.

Pollack conceived of the awards as a counterpart to existing music video recognition programs, with a specific focus on the behind-the-scenes workforce. In an interview with USC Annenberg Media, he stated: "The people behind the curtains don't always get the most love and flowers as they should. The VMAs are about the artist, and this is about the creators. We wanted to have a night to celebrate the unsung heroes of the videos."

=== Ceremonies ===
The inaugural ceremony took place on April 5, 2025, at the W Hollywood hotel in Hollywood, California, hosted by digital content creator Max Goodrich. The Music Video of the Year award was presented to "Taste" by Sabrina Carpenter, and Ukrainian director Tanu Muino was named Director of the Year for her work on Lady Gaga's "Disease."

The second ceremony took place on March 28, 2026, again at the W Hollywood hotel. Music Video of the Year was awarded to "Berghain" by Rosalía featuring Björk, directed by Nicolás Méndez. The ceremony introduced new categories including Best Animation, Best Innovative Direction, Best Color Grading, and Best Shot on Phone. Pollack indicated that subsequent editions would expand programming to include artist involvement and industry seminars.

== Selected past winners ==
=== 2026 ===
Category	Winner
Music Video of the Year	"Berghain" by Rosalía ft. Björk
Director of the Year	Christian Breslauer
Breakout Director of the Year	Claire Bishara
Producer of the Year	Collin Druz
Cinematographer of the Year	Neema Sadeghi
Production Designer of the Year	Brittany Porter
Editor of the Year	Sofia Kerpan
Stylist of the Year	Brett Alan Nelson
Choreographer of the Year	Robbie Blue
Best Directing	"Berghain" by Rosalía ft. Björk
Best Cinematography	"Nuevayol" by Bad Bunny
Best Production Design	"Supernatural" by Ariana Grande
Best Choreography	"Anxiety" by Doechii
Best Acting	"Loser" by Tame Impala
Best Casting	"Little Bit Closer" by Sam Fender
Best Styling	"Sports Car" by Tate McRae
Best Hair & Makeup	"Gorgeous" by Doja Cat
Best Editing	"Luther" by Kendrick Lamar ft. SZA
Best Color Grading	"High Fashion" by Addison Rae
Best Narrative	"Denial Is a River" by Doechii
Best Action	"Stranger" by Doja Cat
Best Pop	"Tears" by Sabrina Carpenter
Best Rap	"The Birds Don't Sing" by Clipse, John Legend & Voices of Fire
Best R&B	"Sugar on My Tongue" by Tyler, the Creator

=== 2025 ===
Category	Winner
Music Video of the Year	"Taste" by Sabrina Carpenter
Director of the Year	Tanu Muino
Best New Director	Aerin Moreno
Producer of the Year	Aiden Magarian
Cinematographer of the Year	Nyk Allen
Production Designer of the Year	Cody Fusina
Editor of the Year	Ally Gondeck
Stylist of the Year	Rachel Haas
Choreographer of the Year	Sean Bankhead
Best Directing	"We Can't Be Friends (Wait for Your Love)" by Ariana Grande
Best Cinematography	"HAHAHA" by Lil Dicky
Best Production Design	"Squabble Up" by Kendrick Lamar
Best Choreography	"It's OK I'm OK" by Tate McRae
Best Acting	"Taste" by Sabrina Carpenter
Best Casting	"Eusexua" by FKA Twigs
Best Styling	"New Woman" by Lisa ft. Rosalía
Best Hair & Makeup	"Disease" by Lady Gaga
Best Editing	"Espresso" by Sabrina Carpenter
Best Concept	"Squabble Up" by Kendrick Lamar
Best Narrative	"War in the Trenches" by Nige
Best Comedy	"Taste" by Sabrina Carpenter
Best Pop	"Please Please Please" by Sabrina Carpenter
Best Hip Hop & Rap	"Squabble Up" by Kendrick Lamar
Best R&B	"Here We Go (Uh Oh)" by Coco Jones
Best Sci-Fi/Thriller	"Make You Mine" by Madison Beer
Best Animation	"Light Shower” by Melanie Martinez
