= Addison (album) =

2025 studio album by Addison Rae

Studio album by Addison Rae
- Released: June 6, 2025
- Studios: MXM, Jungle City
- Genres: Synth-pop; trip hop
- Length: 33:28
- Labels: Columbia; As Long As I'm Dancing
- Producers: Elvira Anderfjärd; Luka Kloser

Addison Rae chronology
AR (2023)	Addison (2025)

Singles from Addison
- 1. "Diet Pepsi" Released: August 9, 2024; 2. "Aquamarine" Released: October 25, 2024; 3. "High Fashion" Released: February 14, 2025; 4. "Headphones On" Released: April 18, 2025; 5. "Fame Is a Gun" Released: May 30, 2025

Addison is the debut studio album by American singer Addison Rae. It was released on June 6, 2025, through Columbia Records under exclusive licensing from As Long As I'm Dancing LLC. Addison was produced by Elvira Anderfjärd and Luka Kloser, who also co-wrote the songs with Rae. The album spawned five singles: "Diet Pepsi", "Aquamarine", "High Fashion", "Headphones On" and "Fame Is a Gun".

Addison was met with widespread acclaim from music critics, who praised the album's production and innovation. The album debuted at number one on the New Zealand Albums Chart and reached the top ten in Australia, Austria, Belgium, Canada, Croatia, Ireland, Lithuania, the Netherlands, Norway, Portugal, Scotland, Switzerland, the United Kingdom, and the United States. Rae embarked on the Addison Tour, her debut concert tour between August and November 2025 in support of the album.

The project helped Rae earn her first Grammy Award nomination at the 68th Annual Grammy Awards, for Best New Artist. Rae, Anderfjärd and Kloser were also recognized by Variety with The Future Is Female Award for "breaking the glass ceiling by writing, producing and performing [the] Grammy-nominated debut album entirely themselves." The album appeared on numerous year-end lists, being named the best album of the year by The Fader and The Washington Post.

== Background ==
Rae originally rose to prominence as a content creator on TikTok where she had amassed over 88 million followers. She later ventured into acting and singing, the latter of which was spurred by her adoration of pop music. On August 18, 2023, Rae released her debut EP AR, which included her debut single "Obsessed" as well as four other tracks, including a collaboration with British singer-songwriter Charli XCX. Rae revealed that XCX played a crucial role in shaping her musical journey following the release of the track. Talking to Vogue about her musical aspirations in 2023, she expressed her desire to have "full control over doing it exactly how I envision it", citing the EP as the "end note to the past few years" as well as the "stepping stone forward in my career".

In an interview with W Magazine, Rae shared that for her first label meeting with Columbia Records, she brought a binder filled with printed photos, colors, and words. Before the album had any sound or music, it existed purely as a collection of visions, visuals, and words. Rae also described the creation of Addison, saying, "It was a very fun and free-flowing environment. There was no pressure to force ourselves to make an album or a certain number of songs. It just happened gradually over time." Rae thought about self-titling the album "for a really long time," noting, "when you do hear all of the music like straight through, there's not really a title that like encompasses all of it." Rae added "Everybody that I played it to as well they were just like, 'Oh it just sounds like just like you. Like, it just sounds like music you would make,'" she recalled.'"

Speaking with Brittany Spanos of Rolling Stone in January 2025, Rae revealed that she enlisted only Luka Kloser and Elvira Anderfjärd to produce her debut studio album. Both are signed to MxM Music, a publishing company owned by Swedish producer Max Martin. Kloser, Anderfjärd and Rae also wrote every song on the album, working between Los Angeles, New York City and Sweden. The album was partially recorded at Martin's studio headquarters in Sweden. Spanos was presented a few album tracks during the interview, which she described as "hypnotic, trance-like pop songs, pulsating and lush" with lyrics that embody the spirit of being "young, fun, and free". Speaking with Suzy Exposito of Elle, Rae, Kloser and Anderfjärd revealed that the album was inspired by Madonna's 1998 album Ray of Light, while the Korg M1 synthesizer was dubbed "the sonic lynchpin" of the album. Rae also cited her dance background as a key influence on her musical style, emphasizing her focus on how music feels and moves the body.

Ahead of its release, numerous publications referred to the album as one of the most anticipated musical projects of 2025. (Note: Attributed to multiple references:) Listings on Rae's online store describe Addison as "the first & last album by Addison Rae", suggesting a possible shift in her artistic identity. In her interview with Elle, Rae said "I feel like I've surpassed Addison Rae ... It's just Addison now."

== Promotion ==
On April 12, 2025, the singer made a surprise appearance at Arca's Coachella 2025 set. During a performance of their collaboration "Arcamarine", Rae teased the album release date by flashing her pink underwear from Victoria's Secret with "June 6" written on them. Rae revealed the album title and the artwork on April 23. She further promoted the album by posing in reference to a photograph of Lindsay Lohan in court for violating the probation orders for her 2007 drinking charge, changing the words from "fuck you" written on Lohan's nail to "June 6" to reference the album's release date. This image of Rae was shared on the Instagram page of celebrity manicurist Natalie Minerva. The album consists of twelve tracks. The album tracklist was revealed through billboards across the world displaying song titles or lyrics, while the track order was revealed on May 21. On May 27, Rae revealed the album trailer, which serves as a reintroduction to the singer. On June 4, Rae teased the music video for the tenth track from the album, "Times Like These", and released it on June 6.

In an interview with The New York Times, Lexee Smith, who was Rae's former creative partner, then reported that the album would have videos for every song on the album, making it a visual album. But to date, it has been noticed that 4 of those 10 music videos, particularly New York, Money is Everything, Summer Forever, and In The Rain have been rumored to be scrapped due to a rift between the two, resulting in Rae deleting the teasers for the upcoming music videos.

=== Singles ===
In 2024, Rae signed with Columbia Records and released her major label debut single "Diet Pepsi", a "dreamy pop song", on August 9, 2024. In a May 2026 interview with Capital FM, Conan Gray revealed that he was the first person in the studio, along with her longtime collaborators Luka Kloser and Elvira Anderfjärd, to hear the chorus of her lead single Diet Pepsi, to which he commented, "You better finish this song, because this is a hit." The single went on to become her breakthrough hit, peaking at number 54 on the Billboard Hot 100 as well as the top 10 in the United Kingdom. The second single "Aquamarine" was released on October 25. Described as a "siren's call wrapped in dance-pop shimmer", comparisons were drawn to the likes of Madonna, Britney Spears and Kylie Minogue. The song was later remixed by Venezuelan producer Arca, titled "Arcamarine". On February 14, 2025, she released the third single "High Fashion", a statement about the "addiction" to fashion and feeling empowered as a result. "Headphones On", reminiscent of "smooth, new jack swing bounce straight out of 1994" mixed with Lana Del Rey-coded lyrics", was released as the fourth single on April 18 along with the inclusion of the interlude "Life's No Fun Through Clear Waters" in the beginning of the music video. Rae described making of the song and video as "cathartic" and a "transformative experience". "Fame Is a Gun" was released as the fifth single on May 30.

=== Live performances ===
Rae performed on June 5, 2025, at The Box, New York City with Spotify to celebrate the release of the album. She performed "Diet Pepsi", "Aquamarine", a jazz rendition of "High Fashion", "Headphones On", "Fame Is a Gun", "Times Like These", and "New York". She performed the same seven songs at The Box Soho, London on June 10. On June 17, Rae announced her first headlining tour, The Addison Tour, with dates in Europe, North America and Australia, set from August through November 2025. A few days later, on June 22, Rae was announced as an opening act for Lana Del Rey's 2025 UK and Ireland Tour, for both London dates, performing most of the songs from both performances at The Box.

== Critical reception ==
Professional ratings
Aggregate scores
Source	Rating
AnyDecentMusic?	7.2/10
Metacritic	79/100
Review scores
Source	Rating
Clash	8/10
Exclaim!	8/10
The Guardian	4/5 stars
The Independent	4/5 stars
The Line of Best Fit	6/10
NME	4/5 stars
Paste	8.2/10
Pitchfork	8.0/10
Rolling Stone	3.5/5 stars
Slant Magazine	3.5/5 stars

Addison received positive reviews upon release. At Metacritic, which assigns a normalized rating out of 100 to reviews from mainstream publications, the album received an average score of 79, based on 15 reviews, indicating "generally favourable reviews".

Rolling Stone's Maya Georgi highlighted the project's vision and production: "Rae's eclectic intentions are loud and clear: to create a distinctive, dreamy soundscape that brings her album moodboards to life." Pitchfork's Meaghan Garvey attributed the album's cohesiveness to the album's overall "feeling" rather than its sound or genre, writing that while Addison's inspirations are "written on her sleeve", the album's sensual and "occasionally euphoric" feeling ties the tracks together. Clash's Sam Franzini categorizes Addison as a masterful pop album—with a unique blend of esoteric, sultry, melancholic, confident, and experimental themes and production. Billboard claimed Rae's "rise to main pop girl is equal parts master class and modern spectacle", and her debut "proves her to be one of one among pop's current crew."

The Guardian's Shaad D'Souza praised Rae's unique sound and writing amidst a crowded pop market: "Rae resists the 2020s impulse to intellectualize every pop album and is unencumbered by ham-fisted concepts, Easter eggs or ultra-prescriptive 'lore' that tells listeners what to think." The Independent's Felicity Martin concluded that Rae has earned her seat at the pop table, describing Addison as an intimate, personal work marked by its signature blend of traditional commercial pop tropes and experimentation—a distinct "weirdness" Martin hopes Rae will lean into even more. Alex Rigotti of NME also lauded the album's "genuine girlish sincerity [...] pop that pairs high-brow sonic references with broader emotional strokes, mostly without feeling contrived", continuing that it is "bold, expressive, and catchy as hell, and with little overt biography, it's completely personal in its craftsmanship."

Variety's Thania Garcia complimented Addison's "unadulterated freedom" and lyricism: "She finds comfort in her own systems of escapism, oftentimes leaving empowered by the moments she feels misunderstood or vulnerable." Maria Sherman of the Associated Press stated the project is "full, stuffed with bejeweled, hypnotic pop songs," writing that "intimacy is one of the album's superpowers, a sensibility that teeters between close mic recordings and big late-night anthems," calling it a "stellar debut album." Heather Taylor-Singh of Exclaim! wrote that "Rae's youthful energy overflows into the album's visual identity" with her "sensual voice driving each track," affirming that, "The album is an earnest, succinct group of tracks that freely flow into each other, and by the end of its 33-minute runtime, every song deserves its spot on the tracklist." Paste's Jaeden Pinder declared it "simultaneously feels like a coronation and a make or break moment, and Addison Rae has brilliantly cemented herself among pop's newest faces." Spencer Kornhaber of The Atlantic gave the album a positive review, addressing the chemistry between Rae and the producers: "Messing around with keyboards and humming top lines, these three women seem to have developed a strong creative flow together," stating: "The only statement that this album is making is in execution: Good pop is good music."

In June 2025, Billboard's editorial staff named Addison one of the best albums of 2025. That same month, Variety and Slant Magazine also included it on their best albums of 2025 lists, with Garcia blurbing for the former that "there's no denying its allure. Rae joyously displays an infectious ebullience that shines on signature songs like "Money Is Everything" and [...] "Diet Pepsi," while Alexander Mooney expressed for the latter that it's "a slinky and scintillating album, poised between self-mythology and self-discovery. [...] Like so much good pop music, Addison makes hard work seem like second nature." In July, Pitchfork listed it as one of the best albums of 2025 so far as well. In a similar albums of the year list for The Quietus, Christian Eede commented: "In an era of over-conceptualized, earnest pop music, Addison is a breath of fresh air." Writing for The Independent, Adam White named Addison as one of the two best pop albums of the year alongside FKA Twigs's Eusexua, writing that both draw from Madonna's Ray of Light. In September, the BBC listed it as one of the 15 best albums of 2025, with Hugh Montgomery praising Rae's "combination of charismatic frivolity and serious artistry that somehow feels like just what the musical landscape needs right now." In a September 2026 interview with Rolling Stone, Australian singer Troye Sivan praised Rae's album, calling it "one of the best pop albums of the last fifteen years."

=== Year-end lists ===
Many publications ranked Addison among the best albums of 2025. The album was featured in the top 10 by The Fader (1st), The Washington Post (1st), NME (2nd), The Guardian (4th), Slant Magazine (5th), Dork (6th), The Independent (6th), Time Out (6th), Business Insider (7th), Harper's Bazaar (7th), The Forty-Five (9th), and the BBC (10th). It was also featured in the top 20 by Billboard (11th), Dazed (11th), Oor (12th), Pitchfork (12th), Rolling Stone (12th), The New Yorker (14th), Stereogum (17th), and PopMatters (18th), and in the top 50 by Drowned in Sound (23rd), Loud and Quiet (25th), Clash (40th), Paste (45th), Exclaim! (50th), and The Line of Best Fit (50th). Addison also appeared in unranked lists by the Associated Press, Cosmopolitan, The Economist, Elle, Notion, Nylon, and Vogue.

On individual critics' lists, Addison was ranked second by Variety's Thania Garcia, seventh by The New York Times's Jon Caramanica, and ninth by Rolling Stone's Rob Sheffield. On lists of the best pop albums of 2025, it was ranked eighth by PopMatters and twelfth by Pitchfork, and was also included in an unranked list by V. Paste ranked it as the seventh-best debut album of 2025, and NME included it in an unranked list of the 20 best debut albums of the year.

Select year-end rankings
Publication	List	Rank	Ref.
Billboard	The 50 Best Albums of 2025	11	
The Fader	The 50 Best Albums of 2025	1	
The Guardian	The 50 Best Albums of 2025	4	
The Independent	The 20 Best Albums of 2025	6	
NME	The 50 Best Albums of 2025	2	
Pitchfork	The 50 Best Albums of 2025	12	
Rolling Stone	The 100 Best Albums of 2025	12	
Slant Magazine	The 50 Best Albums of 2025	5	
Time Out	The 25 Best Albums of 2025	6	
The Washington Post	The Top 10 Albums of 2025	1	

== Commercial performance ==
In the United States, Addison debuted at number four on the Billboard 200, becoming Rae's first appearance on the chart, with first-week sales of 48,500 album-equivalent units, consisting of 23,000 pure album sales and 25,500 streaming equivalent album units from 33 million streams. In the United Kingdom, Addison debuted at number two on the UK Albums Chart with 14,827 album-equivalent units. In Australia, the album also debuted at number two on the Australian Albums Chart. In New Zealand, it topped the Official Top 40 Albums, and marked her first number-one album.

== Track listing ==
All tracks are written by Addison Rae, Elvira Anderfjärd, and Luka Kloser; "Lost & Found" and "High Fashion" were additionally written with Tove Burman.

Addison track listing
No.	Title	Length
1.	"New York"	2:32
2.	"Diet Pepsi"	2:49
3.	"Money Is Everything"	2:02
4.	"Aquamarine"	2:43
5.	"Lost & Found (Interlude)"	0:48
6.	"High Fashion"	3:18
7.	"Summer Forever"	3:47
8.	"In the Rain"	3:33
9.	"Fame Is a Gun"	3:03
10.	"Times Like These"	3:52
11.	"Life's No Fun Through Clear Waters (Interlude)"	0:57
12.	"Headphones On"	4:00
Total length:		33:24

Notes

- One-year anniversary picture disc edition includes "Arcamarine" (Fame and Glory edition) as a bonus track, placed after "Aquamarine".

== Personnel ==
Credits were adapted from Tidal.

Musicians

- Addison Rae – vocals
- Elvira Anderfjärd – background vocals, keyboards, programming, production
- Luka Kloser – keyboards, programming, production (all tracks), background vocals (tracks 1–3, 5, 7–12)
- Tove Burman – background vocals (tracks 5, 6), keyboards (6)

Technical

- Elvira Anderfjärd – engineering
- Luka Kloser – engineering
- Bryce Bordone – engineering assistance
- Randy Merrill – mastering
- Serban Ghenea – mixing

== Charts ==
=== Weekly charts ===
Chart (2025–2026)	Peak position
Australian Albums (ARIA)	2
Austrian Albums (Ö3 Austria)	9
Belgian Albums (Ultratop Flanders)	3
Belgian Albums (Ultratop Wallonia)	7
Canadian Albums (Billboard)	6
Croatian International Albums (HDU)	10
Czech Albums (ČNS IFPI)	27
Danish Albums (Hitlisten)	23
Dutch Albums (Album Top 100)	6
Finnish Albums (Suomen virallinen lista)	18
French Albums (SNEP)	20
German Albums (Offizielle Top 100)	25
Greek Albums (IFPI)	71
Hungarian Albums (MAHASZ)	26
Icelandic Albums (Tónlistinn)	15
Irish Albums (Official Charts)	2
Italian Albums (FIMI)	76
Lithuanian Albums (AGATA)	7
New Zealand Albums (RMNZ)	1
Norwegian Albums (IFPI Norge)	10
Polish Albums (ZPAV)	13
Portuguese Albums (AFP)	3
Scottish Albums (Official Charts)	2
Slovak Albums (ČNS IFPI)	21
Spanish Albums (PROMUSICAE)	13
Swedish Albums (Sverigetopplistan)	32
Swiss Albums (Schweizer Hitparade)	8
UK Albums (Official Charts)	2
US Billboard 200	4

=== Year-end charts ===
Chart (2025)	Position
Australian Albums (ARIA)	97
Belgian Albums (Ultratop Flanders)	188

== Certifications ==
Region	Certification	Certified units/sales
Brazil (Pro-Música Brasil)	Gold	20,000^{‡}
New Zealand (RMNZ)	Gold	7,500^{‡}
United Kingdom (BPI)	Silver	60,000^{‡}
United States (RIAA)	Gold	500,000^{‡}
^{‡} Sales+streaming figures based on certification alone.
