= The Addison Tour =

2025 concert tour by Addison Rae

- Tour by Addison Rae
- Promotional poster
- Location: Europe; North America; Australia
- Associated album: Addison
- Start date: August 25, 2025
- End date: November 18, 2025
- Legs: 3
- No. of shows: 32

The Addison Tour was the debut concert tour by American singer Addison Rae, in support of her debut studio album, Addison (2025). It commenced on August 25, 2025, in Dublin, Ireland, and concluded on November 18 of the same year in Sydney, Australia. Spanning 32 shows across North America, Europe, and Australia, the Addison Tour marked Rae's first concert tour.

The tour saw significant demand, with large online ticket queues, multiple added dates and venue upgrades across major cities. It received positive reviews from critics, who praised Rae's polished stage presence, energetic production and charisma, noting she performed above the level typically expected of a debut tour and was often compared to Britney Spears.

== Announcements ==
On June 17, 2025, Rae announced that she would embark on her first concert tour, the Addison Tour, spanning twenty-four shows across Europe, North America, and Australia. The pre-sale and general sale dates were announced concurrently. Pre-sales started on June 18, while general sales began on June 20, 2025. During the ticket pre-sale, Ticketmaster queue sizes for several US dates were up to 100,000 devices. Shortly after, Rae announced additional dates for New York and Los Angeles on October 3 and October 20, respectively, due to high demand. On the same day, three extra shows for Australia were also announced. On June 19, Rae added an extra London date and a new Houston date due to high demand, as well as a venue upgrade in Cologne, Germany. On August 5, 2025, Rae announced venue upgrades for Dublin, London and Paris due to high demand. On September 2, 2025, several changes to the tour schedule were announced, including venue upgrades for the concerts in Toronto and Chicago. The performance initially planned for Oakland was relocated to the Bill Graham Civic Auditorium in San Francisco due to high demand. On the same date, an additional show was added in Los Angeles.

Rae offered a premium experience titled the Divine VIP Upgrade. The package, which required a separately purchased concert ticket, included a private sound bath session with Rae and her dancers, a Q&A session, and a professional photo opportunity with Rae. Fans were also allowed to bring up to three personal items for autographing, each with a customized message. Additional perks included early venue entry, an autographed tour poster, and exclusive merchandise. In 2026, Rae appeared as a featured act at various music festivals across Australia, North America, South America, and Europe, with a theatrical set staged for Coachella 2026 titled The Fame and Glory Show.

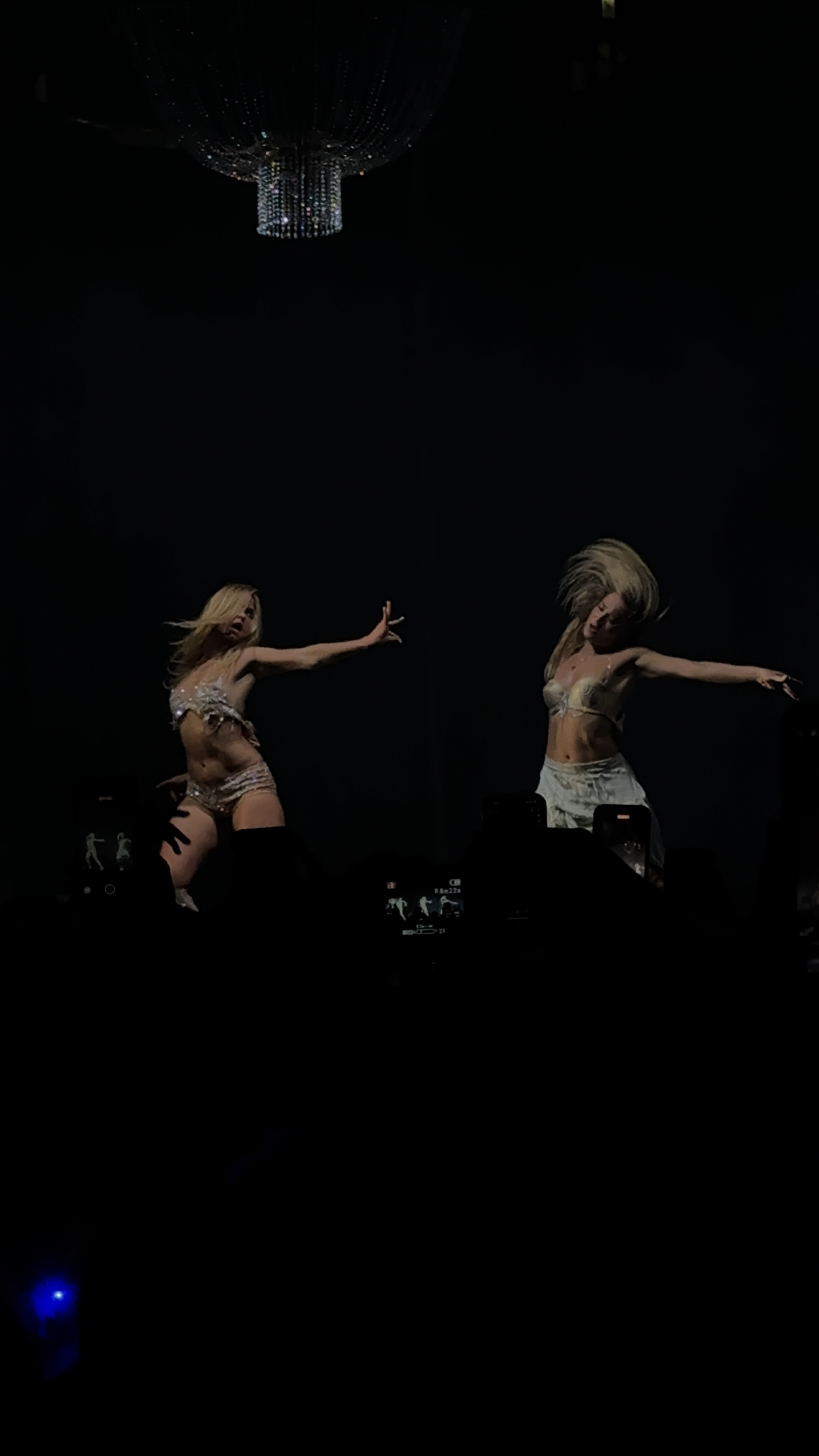
Addison Rae performing in "The Addison Tour" opening night in Dublin

== Critical reception ==
=== Europe ===
The European leg of the tour opened to widespread acclaim. Irish Examiner's Nicole Glennon stated that despite the "sky high" pressure due to it being Rae's longest performance time to date, "she delivered" on the opening night of the tour and drew comparisons to Britney Spears. Writing for The Telegraph, Ed Power echoed the Spears comparison and considered "she delivered a fun but at times stylistically jarring concert," and, "By the end, it was clear that Rae has plenty of raw charisma, yet you were left wondering what sort of pop star she ultimately wants to be." Elle Palmer of Clash praised the August 28, 2025, show in Manchester, writing that, "A final bow cements Addison as a true performer and her live show as one of the most entertaining and in-demand right now. Sure, every girl at the show was fun, but none quite as fun as Addison." In a four-star review of the same show for The Guardian, Daniel Dylan Wray opined that despite Rae having only performed live a handful of times, she "has the stagecraft of a veteran" and is "remarkably assured as her voice glides across pounding club-ready beats." The Mancunion's Frankie Austick calls the tour "a rare occasion" where Rae, who could fill bigger venues, delivers an unmatched level of intimacy. He called her performance "nothing short of spectacular," with arena-style staging, choreography, crowd interaction, and outfit changes, and that "not one track felt like a filler." Austick noted that Rae's dedication to pop stardom was evident in the effort she put into her stage presence, adding that the "theatre-level of commitment" has only been seen before from veterans such as Spears and Lady Gaga, who understand pop is about "escapism as sound alone."

Rhian Daly of NME also rated the August 31 concert in London four out of five stars, stating that "the singer's debut headline tour showcases her as a polished performer beyond her years, and fully justifies the hype around her," with the crowd "going berserk at every opportunity" and each word of her singles being "yelled back at Rae with a fervour usually reserved for much longer-established artists." Evening Standard's El Hunt felt that "Rae is clearly well-prepared" as she "gives us a short and sharp 45 minutes of pure pop, minus an encore, and sans support act."

=== North America ===
Reviewing the September 23 show, DeVaughn Douglas from the Houston Press commented that the city's reception "showed why The Addison Tour has quickly become one of the most talked about debuts of the year," with Rae's "mix of spectacle and sincerity proved she can hold her own on a major stage, balancing choreography heavy productions with moments of intimacy that kept the crowd invested," naming her rendition of "Von Dutch" a highlight. In a five-star review of the Houston show for Rice Thresher, Kosi Onwuamaegbu applauded Rae's extensive crowd interactions and observed that, "The beauty is that her tour feels like someone saw those performances and actually did somehow go from the audience's seat to the stage. It feels like someone living out their wildest dream, incredibly aware of it the entire time."

Writing for the Dallas Observer, Eric Diep praised her performance, describing it as "tightly produced, each song with a different aesthetic that allows her to glide confidently and comfortably," continuing, "We can keep reminiscing on how her music sounds like Lana, Madonna or Britney, or we can live in the era of Addison Rae: dreamy and enchanting," concluding that, "She gave us her all." KOOP's Zelenny Lozano wrote after the Austin show that "Addison showed she has everything it takes to achieve pop superstardom," with "her infectious personality radiated in the transitional moments between songs." Following the September 28 concert in Atlanta, Chiara Agudelo Lenhard of Her Campus described it a "night of glitz, glamour, and undeniably hypnotizing tracks during her one-of-a-kind debut world tour," also commending Rae for creating a "welcoming environment" as she interacts with the audience and even asks members to greet the people next to them. She noted "it was easy to feel the energy still palpable after this electric set" as Rae's "free-spirited approach to performing feels like a breath of fresh air, leaving you excited to hear more and wishing you could put the feeling on replay."

The Washington Post's Chris Richards praised the September 30 show in Washington, writing about Rae's music: "while perfection doesn't exist in the real world, it's hard to imagine how this thing could be any better," using the key change in "Diet Pepsi" as a metaphor for the concert as "that abrupt shift in pressure felt violently metaphysical, as if Rae's sucralose fantasies were being pushed down from heaven into consensus reality." Mitchell Peters from Billboard described the New York City concerts as "high-energy" shows performed to "hyped-up crowds," as Rae "expressed her excitement and connection with the audience, telling fans she wished she had even more music to perform." Josh Korngut of Exclaim! reviewed the October 8 show in Toronto and felt it "showcased the artist as an undeniable new leading voice in the genre," calling the concert "a refreshing shake-up for an ecosystem that was feeling somewhat stalled-out in its corners. Glittering, arthouse and turn-of-the-millennium to its core, the show was pure energy and never let the audience catch its breath." Samir Hussein found that "Diet Pepsi" closing the same show sealed the deal "with a reminder that Rae's ascent isn't a question of talent, but inevitability." Reviewing the last show of the North American leg in Los Angeles for Collider, Jazmin Kylene highlighted the surprise encore of "Nothing On (But the Radio)", which hadn't appeared in any other city, describing the performance as "electrifying" and assessing that Rae's stage presence clearly honors Spears, from choreography to themes of empowered womanhood, deeming that she has "certainly proven she's well-capable of holding the baton."

=== Australia ===
Katy Hall from The Sydney Morning Herald awarded the first show in Melbourne, and first of six sold out shows in Australia, four stars, stating that, "As a whole, the highly choreographed moves and costume changes made the experience feel like a glorious mashup of early '00s and ethereal pop," and affiming, "Despite having no support act, no encore, and not a single instrumentalist or DJ on stage, the show was a phenomenon." Nick Buckley from the Guardian Australia awarded it four out of five stars, and wrote that, "You can't help but root for Rae, an artist who refuses to quit" while calling the concert a "glorious fantasy" and "welcome breath of escapism."

== Set list ==
The following set list is obtained from the August 25, 2025, show in Dublin. It is not intended to represent all dates throughout the tour.

1. "Fame Is a Gun"
2. "I Got It Bad" (contains elements of "...Baby One More Time")
3. "New York"
4. "Summer Forever"
5. "2 Die 4"
6. "Von Dutch (remix)"
7. "In the Rain"
8. "High Fashion"
9. "Aquamarine" / "Arcamarine"
10. "Headphones On"
11. "Money Is Everything"
12. "Obsessed"
13. "Times Like These"
14. "Diet Pepsi"

=== Notes ===
- During the October 22, 2025, concert in Los Angeles, Charli XCX joined Rae on stage to perform "2 Die 4" and "Von Dutch (remix)". Rae also did an encore performance of "Nothing On (But the Radio)", which marked the first time she performed the song live.

== Tour dates ==
List of 2025 concerts, showing date, city, country and venue
Date (2025)	City	Country	Venue
August 25	Dublin	Ireland	3Arena (Note: The venue for the Dublin show on August 26, 2025, was moved to August 25 and upgraded from the National Stadium following high demand.)
August 28	Manchester	England	Manchester Academy
August 30	London	England	O_{2} Academy Brixton (Note: The venue for the London shows on August 30 and 31, 2025, was upgraded from the O_{2} Forum Kentish Town following high demand.)
August 31	London	England	O_{2} Academy Brixton
September 2	Paris	France	Zénith Paris (Note: The venue for the Paris show on September 2, 2025, was upgraded from the Olympia following high demand.)
September 4	Brussels	Belgium	Cirque Royal
September 5	Amsterdam	Netherlands	Melkweg
September 7	Berlin	Germany	Uber Eats Music Hall
September 8	Cologne	Germany	Palladium (Note: The venue for the Cologne show on September 8, 2025, was upgraded from the Live Music Hall following high demand.)
September 22	Austin	United States	Moody Theater
September 23	Houston	United States	713 Music Hall
September 25	Dallas	United States	South Side Ballroom
September 27	Nashville	United States	The Pinnacle
September 28	Atlanta	United States	The Eastern
September 30	Washington, D.C.	United States	The Anthem
October 1	New York City	United States	Brooklyn Paramount
October 3	New York City	United States	Terminal 5
October 5	Boston	United States	Roadrunner
October 7	Philadelphia	United States	The Fillmore Philadelphia
October 8	Toronto	Canada	Coca-Cola Coliseum (Note: The venue for the Toronto show on October 8, 2025, was upgraded from the Rebel following high demand.)
October 10	Chicago	United States	Aragon Ballroom (Note: The venue for the Chicago show on October 10, 2025, was upgraded from the Riviera Theatre following high demand.)
October 13	Denver	United States	Mission Ballroom
October 16	San Francisco	United States	Bill Graham Civic Auditorium (Note: The venue for the San Francisco show on October 16, 2025, was upgraded from the Fox Oakland Theater following high demand.)
October 19	Los Angeles	United States	Wiltern Theatre
October 20	Los Angeles	United States	Wiltern Theatre
October 22	Los Angeles	United States	Greek Theatre
November 11	Melbourne	Australia	Forum Theatre
November 12	Melbourne	Australia	Forum Theatre
November 14	Brisbane	Australia	Fortitude Music Hall
November 15	Brisbane	Australia	Fortitude Music Hall
November 17	Sydney	Australia	Enmore Theatre
November 18	Sydney	Australia	Enmore Theatre
