= High Fashion (Addison Rae song) =

2025 single by Addison Rae

Single by Addison Rae

from the album Addison
- Released: February 14, 2025
- Studio: MXM
- Genre: Synth-pop; electropop
- Length: 3:18
- Label: Columbia; As Long As I'm Dancing
- Lyricists: Addison Rae Easterling; Elvira Anderfjärd; Luka Kloser; Tove Burman
- Producers: Luka Kloser; Elvira Anderfjärd

Addison Rae singles chronology
"Aquamarine" (2024)	"High Fashion" (2025)	"Headphones On" (2025)

Music video
- "High Fashion" on YouTube

"High Fashion" is a song by American singer Addison Rae. It was released on February 14, 2025, through Columbia Records, as the third single from Rae's debut studio album, Addison. A synth-pop and electropop track with new wave and R&B elements, "High Fashion" was written by Rae, Elvira Anderfjärd, Luka Kloser, and Tove Burman, and produced by Kloser and Anderfjärd.

An accompanying music video was directed by Mitch Ryan and filmed in New Orleans, Louisiana, Rae's home state. It received a nomination for Best International Pop Video at the 2025 UK Music Video Awards and won Best Color Grading at the Hollywood Music Video Awards 2026. "High Fashion" received praise from music critics, with emphasis on the song's production and on the continued strength of Rae's recent releases. The song featured in the setlist of her debut concert The Addison Tour in 2025.

== Background and release ==
On October 30, 2024, the song was teased via a telephone call from the number located on Rae's website. In Rae's Rolling Stone February 2025 cover story, it was revealed that Rae was working on her debut studio album and would soon be releasing her third single titled "High Fashion". Rae worked with MxM Music's songwriters Luka Kloser and Elvira Anderfjärd to write the song. An official teaser was published on February 10, 2025, announcing the release date to be February 14, 2025. The cover art was revealed on February 12, 2025.

In the song's refrain, Rae sings "I don't need your drugs / I'd rather get high fashion." The mid-tempo synth-pop and electropop track has new wave and R&B elements, and was written by Rae alongside Tove Burman and producers Luka Kloser and Elvira Anderfjärd. In an interview with Vogue France, Rae described it as "a very free-spirited track", comparing it to her 2024 single "Diet Pepsi", "but in a rawer, more intense, very sexy way, with a touch of vulnerability", sharing that she "put a lot of myself into this song." She said the idea for the song came from seeing a funny Pinterest post: "It was like, 'Fuck cocaine—let's get high on fashion!' [...] It was like, 'I don't need your drugs.' As in, 'I don't need this person's addictive energy in my life, I'd rather have high fashion.'"

== Reception ==
Jason Lipshutz of Billboard said that the song is "a worthy sequel" to "Diet Pepsi", noting that she "sounds increasingly confident while delivering lines." Rolling Stone said the track "continues the TikTok queen-turned-pop star's music takeover", calling it "another cheeky hit." Paper named it "song of the week", comparing the song to the work of Mount Kimbie and describing it as "hypnotic and euphoric and hugely weird, three things in short supply of late." Sydney Brasil of Exclaim! commented that Rae is "three for three with her latest singles" and that "High Fashion" is "a Confessions of a Shopaholic-coded track that gets the same sultry treatment as the songs you'd hear on an FM radio pre-game mix in 2007." Notion similarly expressed "it's three from three for Addison Rae, who's on a generational run of pop singles", continuing that the track is "an electro-pop brooder, not as instantly catchy as 'Diet Pepsi' or 'Aquamarine' but one that builds with tension and eventually explodes into a frenzy of EDM and trap."

InStyle's Courtney Thompson wrote that "Rae's doing God's work" in the "synth-heavy confection that will probably become the soundtrack for all of your debaucherous adventures in the months to come", adding that "2025 will cement her status as a princess of the genre." Meaghan Garvey of Pitchfork reviewed the track, blurbing that Rae "makes not trying look easy" with the "squelchy, effervescent third single", noting its "finger-snap percussion, the key change halfway through the hook, [and] the way it resists buoyancy and sinks slowly instead." It was then included on that week's Pitchfork Selects Playlist. Joel Calfee of Harper's Bazaar compared the song's intro to FKA Twigs and praised Rae's discography as "only [getting] more fascinating with each new single." Steffanee Wang of The Fader highlighted "High Fashion" as Rae's best single release, calling it a "breathless pop odyssey" and remarking that "it's still astonishing how genuinely high quality each release has been." Writing for Ones to Watch, Giselle Libby echoed earlier reviews that the single "marks a three-peat for the widely doubted, natural born star", is "an epic celebration of Rae's lust for life and freedom of expression", and "there's a real underlying power being harnessed through the music and its complementary visuals." It polled at number 189 in the Triple J Hottest 100 of 2025.

Critics' year-end rankings of "High Fashion"
Publication	List	Rank	Ref.
KTLA	The 50 best songs of 2025	—N/a	
Rolling Stone	The 100 Best Songs of 2025	21	

== Music video ==
Directed by Mitch Ryan, the official music video was filmed in and references New Orleans, Louisiana, Rae's home state. Portions of the video feature Rae lying in a burning sugarcane field, in a closet, eating sugar-dusted beignets and dancing with a sifter of confectioners' sugar alluding to powdered cocaine. The music video's wardrobe is inspired by Dorothy Gale in The Wizard of Oz (1939), including the iconic ruby slippers, as well as by Britney Spears. Olivia Craighead of The Cut said the video was reminiscent of the "Tumblr aesthetic". Harper's Bazaar praised Rae's wardrobe in the video, styled by Dara Allen, as embodying a "unique sartorial voice—one that's minimalist and evocative and speaks to someone with a dancer's background—which helps Rae stand out in an industry full of impeccably dressed pop stars."

Rae explained it was "really important" for her to shoot the video in Louisiana because she saw it as a reflection of the way she felt growing up and then moving to Los Angeles, saying: "the Wizard of Oz of it all, I just felt like a fish out of water, in a way. But I always knew I wanted to be famous, to be a movie star, to be a singer—to just be a performer. That was always something I wanted—the glamour and the fashion," continuing, "It's almost like I'm convincing myself in this song, like, 'No, I don't want this—I want the fashion, I want the childhood dreams, I want that life. Don't forget, don't fall in love—you'd rather get these dreams accomplished.'" "High Fashion" was nominated for Best International Pop Video at the 2025 UK Music Video Awards and won Best Color Grading at the Hollywood Music Video Awards 2026.

== Charts ==
Chart performance for "High Fashion"
Chart (2025)	Peak position
Ireland (IRMA)	73
New Zealand Hot Singles (RMNZ)	9
UK Singles (OCC)	69
US Hot Dance/Pop Songs (Billboard)	11

== Release history ==
Release history for "High Fashion"
Region	Date	Format(s)	Version	Label(s)	Ref.
Various	February 14, 2025	Digital download; streaming	Original	Columbia; As Long As I'm Dancing	
