= Nymphet Alumni =

American culture podcast

Nymphet Alumni is an American fashion and cultural commentary podcast founded in 2021 and hosted by Alexi Alario, Sam Cummins, and Biz Sherbert. It is credited with coining the term "blokette" (a portmanteau of "blokecore" and "coquette," which describes a style combining coquette fashion with British football apparel) and its American counterpart, "broquette." They were described by Interview magazine as "equal parts cool-girl historians and low-key visionaries" and by stylist Mel Ottenberg as "three fun gals talking about culture and stuff". In March 2025 they were featured in i-D as one of seven viral creators "shaping the internet," were recommended as cultural critics to follow in The Atlantic in October 2025, and were picked for The Guardian's "best podcasts of the week" in November 2024.

== Content ==
Nymphet Alumni's episodes cover analysis, prediction, and commentary of past and future trends, blending internet and pop culture knowledge with cultural theory and criticism. They were noted in Nylon for their ability to "will trends into existence" and for "demystifying aesthetic codes and making cultural analysis interesting to a new generation of young women." In addition to TikTok and pop culture, they also take inspiration from scholars like Marshall McLuhan, Walter Benjamin, and Stephan Greenblatt.

The first two episodes were dedicated to an analysis of American Apparel and its cultural impact, and they have gone on to record over 100 episodes on various fashion and cultural trends. Episodes include "Sugar Cookie Consumerism," "Dark Suburbia and the Xandemic," "Mass Bushwick," "Spiritual Bimboism," "Into the Superflat," "Shoe Diva," "Male Pirate Dressing," and "Pastel Protestant Grandmother." They offer additional paid content through their Substack.

The podcast has hosted a mix of academics, musicians, journalists, influencers, and artists as guests including The Dare, Hari Nef,Mel Ottenberg, Rayne Fisher-Quann, Dr. Valerie Steele, Jon Caramanica, Caroline Munro, and Avery Trufelman.

== Blokette ==
Nymphet Alumni's "Blokette" episode came out on October 30, 2022, and describes the style as British sportswear elements (such as jerseys, oversized jackets, Adidas Sambas, and scrunch socks) combined with coquette style (such as ribbons, bows, braids, baby tees, mini skirts/shorts). The podcast has been attributed as the originator of the term "blokette" by publications such as Teen Vogue, Interview magazine, and Harper's Bazaar Singapore. The term has since been seen on the Today Show and in publications including Vogue, Marie Claire, and Daily Mail. Celebrities that have been identified with this style include Bella Hadid, Hailey Bieber, and Kim Kardashian.

== Podcast Origin ==
Alario, Cummins, and Sherbert met on Instagram and were based in New York, Texas, and London respectively. They started chatting via voice note DMs during the lockdown of 2020. Eventually, Sherbert, a writer and critic whose work has appeared in The Face, AnOther Magazine, and i-D, pitched the podcast idea to Alario, who was finishing her critical and visual studies degree at Pratt Institute, and Cummins, who was living in Texas working as a waitress, after seeing a need for more discourse on how internet culture has shaped fashion and aesthetics. They started brainstorming in a Google Doc, and “sparks flew.” They didn't meet in person until 2022, after months of virtual podcasting together.

Their podcast name is a reference to early-2010s Tumblr culture and likely the novel Lolita, in which the word "nymphet" was coined.
