= Disappearance of Evelyn Hartley =

Unsolved 1953 missing-person case

Evelyn Hartley
- Born: November 22, 1938; La Crosse, Wisconsin, U.S.
- Disappeared: October 24, 1953 (aged 14); La Crosse County, Wisconsin, U.S.
- Status: Missing for 72 years, 11 months and 6 days [Presumed Deceased]
- Height: 5 ft 7 in (1.70 m)

Evelyn Grace Hartley (born November 22, 1938) was an American teenager who mysteriously disappeared on October 24, 1953, from La Crosse County, Wisconsin. Her disappearance sparked a search involving 2,000 people. In the year following her disappearance, investigators questioned more than 3,500 people though as of 2026 the case remains unsolved.

== Disappearance ==
Locations
1 Last known location.

On October 24, 1953, Viggo Rasmussen, a professor at La Crosse State College, now University of Wisconsin–La Crosse, hired Evelyn Hartley, the daughter of a fellow professor, to take care of his 20-month old daughter. That evening, Evelyn's father Richard called the Rasmussen house several times after she failed to check in as planned at 8:30pm. He received no answer. Concerned, he drove to the Rasmussen house.

When Richard arrived, the doors were locked, the lights and radio were on and items were scattered all over the house. The living room furniture had been moved around to different places, as were Evelyn's school books. Richard found her shoes in different rooms, one shoe upstairs, and one downstairs. He also found his daughter's broken glasses upstairs. Richard did not find Evelyn in the house.

Richard found every room in the house locked, except one in the basement at the back of the house. An opened window was missing a screen, and the screen was found leaning against an outside wall. He found a short stepladder belonging to the homeowner positioned at the opened window. Pry marks were found on some windows, and footprints were found in areas of the house. Blood was found both inside the house and in the yard, with bloody hand prints about 100 feet away in a garage and in a nearby house. The child Evelyn had been caring for was found asleep and unharmed.

== Investigation ==
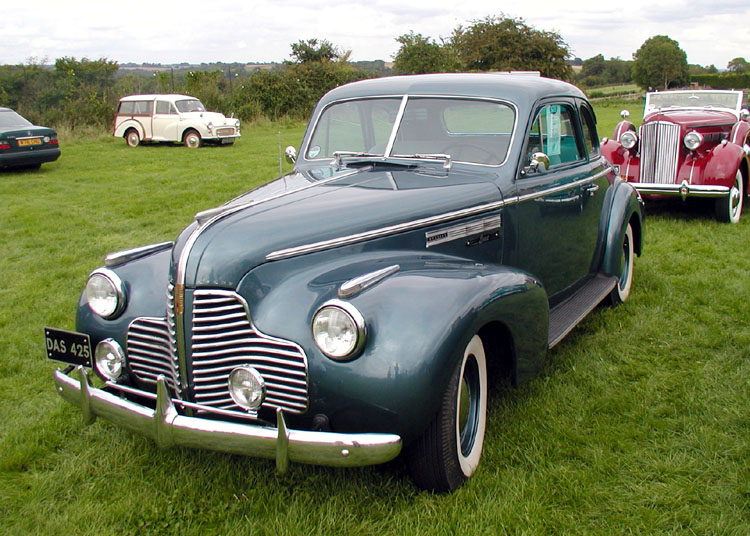
Dark green early 1940s Buick that may have resembled the car sighted

Police believe someone took Evelyn through the yard, but dropped her on the ground before carrying her further. The police used dogs to pick up her scent trail, which ended at Coulee Drive two blocks away. Police thought Evelyn was most likely put into a vehicle there and driven away. They were told by one neighbor they had seen a car repeatedly driving around the neighborhood, and another person who lived nearby claimed they had heard screams an hour earlier. The witness thought it was just children playing.

Two days after the incident, local resident Ed Hofer told police that while driving his vehicle, he was almost hit by a dark green two-tone 1942 Buick as it was speeding in a westerly direction. Inside the Buick, Hofer reported seeing one man was driving the vehicle, with a second man in the backseat with a girl. Hofer reported that a few minutes earlier, he had seen the same two men with the young girl as he was pulling outside his brother-in-law's house located around the corner from the Rasmussen house. Hofer stated that the girl was wedged between the two men and had thought that she was drunk, as the two men were holding her by her arms as they were walking down the street.

Several days later, items of clothing, many of which were stained with blood, were found at various locations. Blood found on the jacket matched Evelyn's blood type.

Over 1,000 members of the local community, including law enforcement officers, the National Guard, Boy Scouts, and La Crosse State College students and faculty, participated in a search in October 1953. The Civil Air Patrol and U.S. Air Force took part in the search. A vehicle inspection program was undertaken with the intent of searching every vehicle in La Crosse County. Gas station attendants were asked to check cars for blood stains. Recent graves were reopened to determine if Evelyn's remains were placed with a recent burial.

In May 1954, mass lie detector tests were conducted on La Crosse-area high school boys in an attempt to find more information about Evelyn's disappearance. Local authorities planned to test 1,750 students and faculty. The testing was controversial, and was halted after around 300 were tested.

In November 1957, Ed Gein was arrested on murder charges in Plainfield, Wisconsin, about 100 miles from the site of Evelyn's kidnapping. He was considered a suspect in Evelyn's disappearance due in part to his visiting a relative near the site of the girl's kidnapping at the time she vanished. Gein denied involvement in the disappearance and passed two lie detector tests. Police found no trace of Evelyn's remains during a search of Gein's Plainfield property. In November 1957, authorities announced that Gein had been cleared of any connection with the disappearances of both Evelyn and Georgia Weckler, an 8-year-old who disappeared in 1947. Despite this, some still consider Gein a suspect.

== Aftermath ==
Evelyn's kidnapping led to one of the biggest searches in Wisconsin history. Public efforts to find her have included the Charley Project and the Soddy-Daisy-Roots Project. A reward fund established in the immediate aftermath of the event reached $6,600, equivalent to $79,000 in 2025. Her parents moved to Portland, Oregon, in the 1970s, and are now both deceased.

== Later developments ==
In 2004, a man named Mel Williams came forward with a conversation he recorded at a bar in 1969. Although his goal was to record a performing musical group, the conversation between two men was unintentionally recorded as well. On the tape, one of the men— identifying himself as Clyde "Tywee" Peterson— implicated himself, along with Jack Gaulphair (or Gaulthair), and an unnamed third party in the disappearance of Eveyln Hartley, also claiming that Evelyn was murdered and buried in La Farge, Wisconsin, after her kidnapping.

The unnamed party is now deceased. Gaulphair died of suicide on December 25, 1967, and Peterson died of a heart attack in 1974. Although authorities promised to investigate the lead, no further developments were ever made.

== In popular culture ==
Evelyn Hartley appears in Monster: The Ed Gein Story, the third season in the Netflix anthology series Monster portrayed by Addison Rae. Ed Gein is portrayed as her murderer and he beats her over the head with a hammer, similar to a scene in 1974's The Texas Chain Saw Massacre.

In 2016, her case was profiled on an episode of The Vanished.

In September 2022, Evelyn Hartley's disappearance was featured as Case 224 of the Casefile podcast.

== See also ==
- List of kidnappings (1950–1959)
- List of people who disappeared mysteriously (1910–1970)
