= Aquamarine (song) =

2024 single by Addison Rae

Single by Addison Rae

from the album Addison
- B-side: "Arcamarine"
- Released: October 25, 2024
- Studio: MXM
- Genre: Deep house; dance-pop
- Length: 2:42
- Label: Columbia; ARXOXO
- Lyricists: Addison Rae Easterling; Elvira Anderfjärd; Luka Kloser
- Producers: Luka Kloser; Elvira Anderfjärd

Addison Rae singles chronology
"Diet Pepsi" (2024)	"Aquamarine" (2024)	"High Fashion" (2025)

Music video
- "Aquamarine" on YouTube

"Aquamarine" is a song by American singer Addison Rae. It was released on October 25, 2024, through Columbia Records, as the second single from Rae's debut studio album, Addison. Just like its predecessor, the song received praise from critics and wider audiences. The deep house and dance-pop song with strong Eurodance influences' lyrics speak about self-discovery. The song was co-written by Addison Rae, Elvira Anderfjärd and Luka Kloser. An accompanying music video was directed by Sean Price Williams and filmed in Paris, France. It received a nomination for Best Newcomer Pop/R&B/Soul/Jazz Video at the 2025 UK Music Video Awards.

== Background ==
Rae shared first hints of new music in June 2024 through her social media. While guest appearing at Charli XCX's Brat Live tour (2024) at her Los Angeles show, she posted a video of herself in a bikini and stilettos walking underwater in a pool as a snippet of "Aquamarine" played over it, which quickly gained traction online and was also teased in the intro to her "Diet Pepsi" music video. Rae said: "'Diet Pepsi' was always going to be the first thing I dropped, this one only felt right to follow up... I think it's very different, but also in the same universe. And I think that was really essential—that it felt very cohesive and it can exist in the same world." The song is about self-discovery, with Rae stating: "The word is so beautiful and the color is so gorgeous that I was like, 'How can I make a song that contextualizes that feeling?'"

== Reception ==
The song received acclaim from both critics and listeners, who praised the song, calling it "her boldest release yet". Grazia described the song as "enshrining her place" as a musical force to be reckoned with and taken seriously. The song was also compared to the works of Madonna, Kylie Minogue, and Britney Spears. Brittany Spanos of Rolling Stone stated Rae "is on a pop hot streak" with the single's release, calling it "dreamy" and "entrancing", while Billboard's Jason Lipshutz wrote Rae's "pop aesthetic is coming into focus" describing it as "dextracting the breathy flirtations from previous single 'Diet Pepsi' and applying them to a sleek, futuristic dance-pop sheen." Gabriel Saulog of Billboard Philippines wrote that the song embraces and breathes new life into its "'90s Eurodance influences –– complete with twinkling synth elements, steady club beats, and Rae's soft yet dreamy vocals that evoke a sensual (if provocative) nature" noting that its reminiscent of Madonna's Ray of Light (1998) and "rightfully" solidifies "her status as a rising figure in today's pop landscape." Michael Kearney of Earmilk praised Rae's "refreshing and bold" sound, writing that "Aquamarine" is a "sparkling, dance-driven track that blends sensual, aquatic themes over a sweeping four-on-the-floor beat," comparing its "nostalgic 90s-inspired synths" specifically to Madonna's "Nothing Really Matters" (1999) and Spears' "Breathe on Me" (2003).

Spanos described "Aquamarine" as "dazzling and hypnotic" while commenting on Rae's reinvention as an artist: "She aligned herself with the music and fashion world's most beloved avant-gardists — Charli, Arca, Rosalía, Petra Collins, Interview Magazine's Mel Ottenberg and Dara Allen — who helped bring her vision to life everywhere from music videos to remixes to surprise performances at Madison Square Garden." English singer-songwriter Charli XCX praised the song online, calling Rae a "musical genius". It polled at number 132 in the Triple J Hottest 100 of 2024.

Critics' year-end rankings of "Aquamarine"
Publication	List	Rank	Ref.
The Independent	The 20 best songs of 2024	16	
Slant	The 50 Best Songs Of 2024	50	

== Music video ==
On October 23, 2024, Rae released a teaser for the music video on her social media platforms. In the clip, Rae can be seen smoking multiple cigarettes before getting up and walking down a dimly lit street in Paris, France. The official video was then released on October 25, with Sean Price Williams returning as director and Mel Ottenberg as creative director following their previous work with Rae on "Diet Pepsi". It was choreographed by Danielle Polanco and styled by model and stylist Dara Allen. Allen explained: "I feel like it was so much about creating a language for the Aqua character that was about being free in that kind of space. It's sort of like, you're unafraid to make others uncomfortable because you're so comfortable in what you're doing... you take the mask off and you're free." The styling was also inspired by "fashion legends" from the '60s and '70s, such as Jane Birkin and Brigitte Bardot.

The video, filmed in Paris, opens with Rae dancing in a room and in a bathtub. The video progresses with her dancing with a chair on the street, interspersed with clips of Rae, wearing a sparkly dress, atop a bridge. Towards the end, she is wearing a skin-colored outfit and dances in the street at night. According to Rae, the fact she becomes increasingly bare as the video progresses "represents the journey to complete abandon of worry and fear of judgement." "Aquamarine" was nominated for Best Newcomer Pop/R&B/Soul/Jazz Video at the 2025 UK Music Video Awards.

== Arca remix ==
"Aquamarine / Arcamarine"

Remix by Addison Rae and Arca
- A-side: "Aquamarine"
- Released: November 15, 2024
- Genre: Reggaeton
- Length: 3:14
- Label: Columbia; ARXOXO
- Lyricists: Addison Rae Easterling; Elvira Anderfjärd; Luka Kloser
- Producer: Arca

Music video
- "Aquamarine / Arcamarine" on YouTube

The idea of collaborating with Venezuelan producer Arca came after a 2023 Vogue interview with Rae, where she stated that she would love to work with Arca and is a huge fan of her music. Later in early November 2024, Arca teased the remix, titled "Arcamarine", while performing live. The remix, a "slowed-down, reggaeton-inflected song", was officially released on November 15, 2024.

Rae also shared an accompanying video for the track shot in a tropical setting (Hawaii) and directed by her friend Lexee Smith. She stated: "Thank you again, Arca, for being an essential part of an electrically special moment in time. [...] I feel sexy and free when I listen to this. You create magic," continuining, "This song/video is profoundly special to me in more ways than one. There is something deeply moving and soul baring about seeing yourself through the lens of your best friend."

== Live performances ==
During Arca's Coachella 2025 set on April 14, Rae appeared as a guest and performed "Arcamarine", and teased the release date for her then-untitled debut studio album. Addison performed Aquamarine at Wembley Stadium on both nights she opened for Lana Del Rey. "Aquamarine" and its remix version both then featured in a medley as part of her debut concert The Addison Tour setlist in 2025.

== Track listing ==
- Digital download
1. "Aquamarine" – 2:42
- Digital download
1. "Aquamarine / Arcamarine" (with Arca) – 3:14
- 7" vinyl

Side A

1. "Aquamarine" – 2:42

Side B

1. "Arcamarine" – 3:14

== Charts ==
Chart performance for "Aquamarine"
Chart (2024–2025)	Peak position
Greece International (IFPI)	70
Ireland (IRMA)	47
New Zealand Hot Singles (RMNZ)	8
UK Singles (Official Charts)	45
US Bubbling Under Hot 100 (Billboard)	10
US Hot Dance/Pop Songs (Billboard)	8

== Certifications ==
Certifications for "Aquamarine"
Region	Certification	Certified units/sales
Brazil (Pro-Música Brasil)	Gold	20,000^{‡}
^{‡} Sales+streaming figures based on certification alone.

== Release history ==
Release history for "Aquamarine"
Region	Date	Format	Version	Label	Ref.
Various	October 25, 2024	Digital download; streaming	Original	Columbia; ARXOXO	
Various	November 15, 2024	Digital download; streaming	"Arcamarine"	Columbia; ARXOXO	
Various	February 28, 2025	7" vinyl	Original; "Arcamarine"	Columbia; ARXOXO	
