= Diet Pepsi (song) =

2024 single by Addison Rae

Single by Addison Rae

from the album Addison
- B-side: "Diet Pepsi (Slowed + Reverb)"
- Written: February 2024
- Released: August 9, 2024
- Studio: MXM
- Genre: Alternative pop; synth-pop
- Length: 2:49
- Label: Columbia; ARXOXO
- Lyricists: Addison Rae Easterling; Luka Kloser; Elvira Anderfjärd
- Producers: Luka Kloser; Elvira Anderfjärd

Addison Rae singles chronology
"Obsessed" (2021)	"Diet Pepsi" (2024)	"Aquamarine" (2024)

Music video
- "Diet Pepsi" on YouTube

"Diet Pepsi" is the major label debut single by American singer Addison Rae. It was released on August 9, 2024, through Columbia Records, as the lead single from Rae's debut studio album, Addison (2025). "Diet Pepsi" received widespread critical acclaim and charted in several countries worldwide. The synth-pop and alternative pop song is about "the immortal feeling of being young and in love."

"Diet Pepsi" emerged as Rae's early breakthrough, peaking within the top ten of the charts in Ireland, Singapore, and the United Kingdom, and within the top 20 in Australia, New Zealand, and the Philippines. In the United States, it became Rae's first entry on the Billboard Hot 100 where it peaked at number 54. Critics praised Rae's vocal performance and use of modulation, and compared the song favorably to the early work of Lana Del Rey. "Diet Pepsi" appeared on numerous critics' and music publications' rankings of the best songs of 2024.

== Background ==
Columbia Records CEO Ron Perry, whom Rae knew through mutual friends, set up a meeting with her following the release of her debut extended play (EP) AR (2023). Rae walked into the meeting with a binder of colors, words, and images of performances, presented as an idea for a future album. By doing this, she rejected the idea of showing any actual music, demos or songs, impressing Perry who signed her in late 2023. In February 2024, Rae met songwriters Luka Kloser and Elvira Anderfjärd in Los Angeles. The trio listened to music all day, but were not getting far with their ideas. As the session neared its end, Kloser started playing the piano, with Rae claiming that all three "magically" started humming the melody that would become the chorus of "Diet Pepsi". It was the first song she wrote for her debut album, Addison.

Rae shared first hints of new music in June 2024 through her social media. The singer got more specific that August by posting snippets and lyrics of the song. On August 5, she revealed the release date and title for her first single with Columbia. The song was originally supposed to be titled "Backseat" before she played it for Charli XCX who told her, "Why isn't the song called 'Diet Pepsi'?" In a November 2025 Substack post, Charli XCX named hearing "Diet Pepsi" for the first time as an example of the privilege of "hear[ing] a lot of incredible music that undoubtably is going to shift culture and public perception months before its released" that her pop-stardom affords her.

== Reception ==
The song received widespread acclaim from both critics and listeners, who praised Rae for her musical shift from her previous bubblegum pop lyrics and sonic direction to an alternative pop sound. Billboard described the song as a "turning point" in Rae's musical journey as it creates more of a clear vision on who Rae is as an artist, opposed to previous projects, while Rolling Stone's Brittany Spanos described "this new Rae [as] strange, campy, and, most important, fun" and "as if she'd taken a John Waters left turn". The New York Times called the song "the aural embodiment of tasteful restraint", and some critics praised Rae's "breathy" vocals and the key change employed in the song's final chorus. Some drew positive comparisons to the music of Lana Del Rey, particularly her 2012 single "Blue Jeans" and its parent album Born to Die (2012). It polled at number 11 in the Triple J Hottest 100 of 2024.

Critics' year-end rankings of "Diet Pepsi"
Publication	List	Rank	Ref.
Billboard	The 100 Best Songs of 2024	8	
Dazed	The 20 Best Tracks of 2024	1	
Dork	Dork's tracks of the year 2024	10	
Exclaim!	20 Best Songs of 2024	12	
The Fader	The 50 best songs of 2024	2	
The Guardian	The 20 best songs of 2024	8	
The New York Times	Jon Caramanica's Best Songs of 2024	4	
NME	The 50 Best Songs of 2024	44	
Paper	Paper's Best Songs of 2024	—N/a	
Paste	The 100 Best Songs of 2024	31	
Pitchfork	The 100 Best Songs of 2024	13	
Rolling Stone	The 100 Best Songs of 2024	22	
Rolling Stone	Rob Sheffield's Top 25 Songs of 2024	4	
Slant	The 50 Best Songs Of 2024	39	
Stereogum	The 50 Best Songs Of 2024	20	
Uproxx	The Best Songs Of 2024	—N/a	
Variety	The 50 Best Songs of 2024	—N/a	

== Commercial performance ==
After the song became a viral sound on TikTok, "Diet Pepsi" became her first song to debut on the US Billboard Hot 100, peaking at number 54 and spending 20 weeks on the chart, while reaching number 9 on the Mainstream Top 40 chart, marking her first top ten song on pop radio.

In the United Kingdom, "Diet Pepsi" debuted at number 73 on the UK Singles Chart on August 30, 2024 – for the week ending date September 5, 2024. The song later peaked at number ten on the UK Singles Chart on November 1, 2024 – for the week ending date November 7, 2024 – becoming Rae's first top ten song in Britain.

== Music video ==
The official music video was released alongside the song on August 9, 2024, and was directed by Sean Price Williams. The video opens with Rae teasing her next single "Aquamarine" and continues with her having fun in a 1972 Cadillac Sixty Special in her underwear, alongside her male love interest portrayed by Drew Van Acker. Much of the video pays homage to the 1965 cult classic Faster, Pussycat! Kill! Kill!, including the video's title card, Rae's dancing, and filming in black and white. Rae named Bruce Conner's 1966 experimental film Breakaway as another reference for the video. Mel Ottenberg served as the video's creative director. Rae recalled having to convince her label to release the song as the lead single from her album, as well as to approve her vision for a black-and-white music video, which they initially questioned due to concerns that audiences tend to avoid monochrome visuals. She explained that she was drawn to the challenge, hoping the format would encourage viewers to slow down and focus, believing the song warranted that level of attention. Williams supported her vision and embraced the approach.

Vulture's Jason P. Frank described Rae's performance as "full Americana princess" while complimenting the video, calling it "funny and good." Brittany Spanos also praised it in a Rolling Stone feature profiling Rae's rise, writing that the "black-and-white video that focused on her fluid movement and sense of humor helped further solidify that cult pop fandom, particularly from queer pop stans." The video was unfavorably compared to Sabrina Carpenter's album artwork for Man's Best Friend by New York Times style reporters Marie Solis and Stella Bugbee, with Bugbee calling it "simple-syrup sexuality, designed to be metabolized fast and easy."

== Live performances ==
Rae performed "Diet Pepsi" along with Charli XCX and Troye Sivan during the Sweat tour, at Madison Square Garden, New York City on September 23, 2024, marking the debut performance of the song. The song was covered by Camila Cabello on Live Lounge for BBC Radio 1 that same month, with Cabello stating that she wishes she wrote the song herself. Blondshell also released a cover of the song recorded at SiriusXMU in June 2025. Rae performed "Diet Pepsi" with Lana Del Rey at Wembley Stadium in London on July 3, 2025, after serving as the opening act for Del Rey's show. Ben Platt performed an arrangement of the song, backed by a string section, at the Las Culturistas Culture Awards, a parody awards show hosted by the podcast of the same name which aired on Bravo in August 2025. This version ultimately went viral online and was released as a single by Interscope Records. Rae then included "Diet Pepsi" as the closing song of her debut concert The Addison Tour setlist in 2025. On October 2, 2025, Rae performed it as part of a medley with album track "New York" on The Tonight Show Starring Jimmy Fallon.

== Charts ==
=== Weekly charts ===
Weekly chart performance for "Diet Pepsi"
Chart (2024–2025)	Peak position
Australia (ARIA)	18
Canada Hot 100 (Billboard)	39
Canada CHR/Top 40 (Billboard)	4
Canada Hot AC (Billboard)	30
Finland Airplay (Radiosoittolista)	36
Global 200 (Billboard)	35
Greece International (IFPI)	39
Ireland (IRMA)	7
Italy Airplay (EarOne)	29
Latvia Airplay (LaIPA)	4
Lithuania (AGATA)	57
Lithuania Airplay (TopHit)	20
Netherlands (Single Tip)	4
Netherlands (Global Top 40)	40
New Zealand (Recorded Music NZ)	17
Philippines (Philippines Hot 100)	19
Portugal (AFP)	84
Romania Airplay (TopHit)	94
San Marino Airplay (SMRTV Top 50)	26
Singapore (RIAS)	10
Sweden (Sverigetopplistan)	92
Switzerland (Schweizer Hitparade)	65
UK Singles (Official Charts)	10
US Billboard Hot 100	54
US Adult Contemporary (Billboard)	29
US Adult Pop Airplay (Billboard)	16
US Dance Airplay (Billboard)	31
US Pop Airplay (Billboard)	9

=== Monthly charts ===
Monthly chart performance for "Diet Pepsi"
Chart (2024)	Peak position
Lithuania Airplay (TopHit)	24

=== Year-end charts ===
Chart (2025)	Position
Australia (ARIA)	74
Canada CHR/Top 40 (Billboard)	20
Canada Hot AC (Billboard)	71
US Pop Airplay (Billboard)	28

== Certifications ==
Certifications for "Diet Pepsi"
Region	Certification	Certified units/sales
Australia (ARIA)	Platinum	70,000^{‡}
Austria (IFPI Austria)	Gold	15,000^{‡}
Brazil (Pro-Música Brasil)	2× Platinum	80,000^{‡}
Canada (Music Canada)	2× Platinum	160,000^{‡}
France (SNEP)	Gold	100,000^{‡}
New Zealand (RMNZ)	Platinum	30,000^{‡}
United Kingdom (BPI)	Platinum	600,000^{‡}
United States (RIAA)	Platinum	1,000,000^{‡}
Streaming
Sweden (GLF)	Gold	6,000,000^{†}
^{‡} Sales+streaming figures based on certification alone.^{†} Streaming-only figures based on certification alone.

== Release history ==
Release history for "Diet Pepsi"
Region	Date	Format	Label	Ref.
Various	August 9, 2024	Digital download; streaming	Columbia	
United States	September 10, 2024	Contemporary hit radio	Columbia	
Italy	October 11, 2024	Radio airplay	Sony Italy	
United States	January 28, 2025	Hot adult contemporary radio	Columbia	
Various	January 31, 2025	LP	Columbia	
Various	November 28, 2025	LP	Columbia	
