= Plain (song) =

2020 single by Benee featuring Lily Allen and Flo Milli

Single by Benee featuring Lily Allen and Flo Milli

from the album Hey U X
- Released: 27 October 2020
- Genre: Alternative pop
- Length: 3:50
- Songwriter(s): Stella Bennett; Jenna Andrews; Joshua Fountain; Jason Schoushkoff; Lily Allen; Tamia Carter
- Producer(s): Joshua Fountain; Djeisan Suskov

Benee singles chronology
"Snail" (2020)	"Plain" (2020)	"Kool" (2020)

Lily Allen singles chronology
"Sweet Like Chocolate" (2019)	"Plain" (2020)

Flo Milli singles chronology
"Mean" (2020)	"Plain" (2020)	"Roaring 20s" (2021)

Lyric video
- "BENEE - Plain ft Lily Allen & Flo Milli (Lyric Video)" on YouTube

"Plain" is a song by New Zealand singer-songwriter Benee featuring British singer Lily Allen and American rapper Flo Milli, released through Republic Records on 27 October 2020 as the third single from her debut studio album Hey U X (2020).

== Background ==
The release of "Plain" was preceded by the singles "Night Garden" and "Snail". On the motive behind the track, Benee told NME:

I wanted to make it a song someone could listen to when they find out their ex is with someone new. The feeling sucks, so I wanted 'Plain' to make ya feel like you have the upper hand. Lily and Flo Milli both have such cool sass, and both their verses really elevated the track!

The song was released as a surprise release with no prior announcement on 27 October 2020 by Republic Records.

== Composition and reception ==
Musically, "Plain" is an alternative pop song that contains "glossy, rolling, trap-heavy beats". The song was described as "self-assured" with its "dreamy guitar hook" and a "thumping beat". Chris DeVille of Stereogum drew comparison between the song's "foggy, blippy, chillwave-adjacent mood" and that of "Clairo with a trap beat". He noted that "the sonic soup is a great environment for Benee, even if it somewhat blurs her voice together with Allen's and therefore obscures the flex of featuring her alt-pop forebear on a song. No such trouble with Flo Milli, who adds a burst of enthusiasm to the track upon arrival." Sose Fuamoli of Triple J described "Plain" as "a message to the ex, delivered with sass and dreamy sounds." She praised Allen's featured verse, describing it as "a beautifully melancholic one" and that by "coupl[ing it] with Benee's already captivating style of vocal delivery, bringing Lily into a song like this feels like a natural flex." Towards the end of the track, Mike Wass of Idolator wrote "Ouch! It turns out the song is meant to be a raised middle-finger to an ex."

== Charts ==
Chart performance of "Plain"
Chart (2020)	Peak position
New Zealand Hot Singles (RMNZ)	13
