= Hey U X =

Studio album by Benee
- Released: 13 November 2020
- Recorded: 2020
- Genre: Alt-pop
- Length: 44:07
- Label: Republic
- Producers: Joshua Fountain; Djeisan Suskov; Claire Boucher; Jonah Christian; Kenny Beats

Benee chronology
Stella & Steve (2019)	Hey U X (2020)	Lychee (2022)

Singles from Hey U X
- 1. "Night Garden" Released: 15 July 2020; 2. "Snail" Released: 10 August 2020; 3. "Plain" Released: 27 October 2020; 4. "Kool" Released: 13 November 2020

Hey U X is the debut studio album by New Zealand singer-songwriter Benee, released on 13 November 2020 by Republic Records. The album was primarily written by Benee and frequent collaborator Josh Fountain, who also executive produced the record. It features guest appearances from Grimes, Lily Allen, Flo Milli, Gus Dapperton, Mallrat and Bakar.

Supported by four singles—"Night Garden", "Snail", "Plain", and "Kool",—Hey U X debuted and peaked at number two on the NZ Albums Chart and number twenty-two on the ARIA Albums Chart. The album received generally positive reviews from critics, with Radio New Zealand listing it among their best albums of 2020.

== Background ==
Benee told Billboard that she would be releasing an album in 2020, before formally announcing the release of Hey U X on 15 October 2020. She had revealed prior to this that it would differ musically from her existing repertoire, telling Uproxx:

I think with this album, I haven't really held back on experimenting with genres and even lyrics. Maybe I would have been more hesitant to do some of the things that I’ve done on this album in my previous bodies of work. [...] I feel like some people who like my other stuff are going to hate this because it's pretty different. But I had a lot of fun making it. [...] I like the idea of blending genres and I don't like the idea of kind of pinpointing. I would call [my music] a crispy apple because I try to make a fresh sound. So it’s a fresh, crispy, apple.

On the namesake, she told The New Zealand Herald, "Hey U X was something that was something that I thought was cute. I feel like there's never a word that sums up the whole thing… I try to just find something that's completely relevant." The album track "All the Time" features Raglan-based musician Muroki who became the first signee to Benee's record label, Olive, which she established in early October 2020.

== Promotion ==
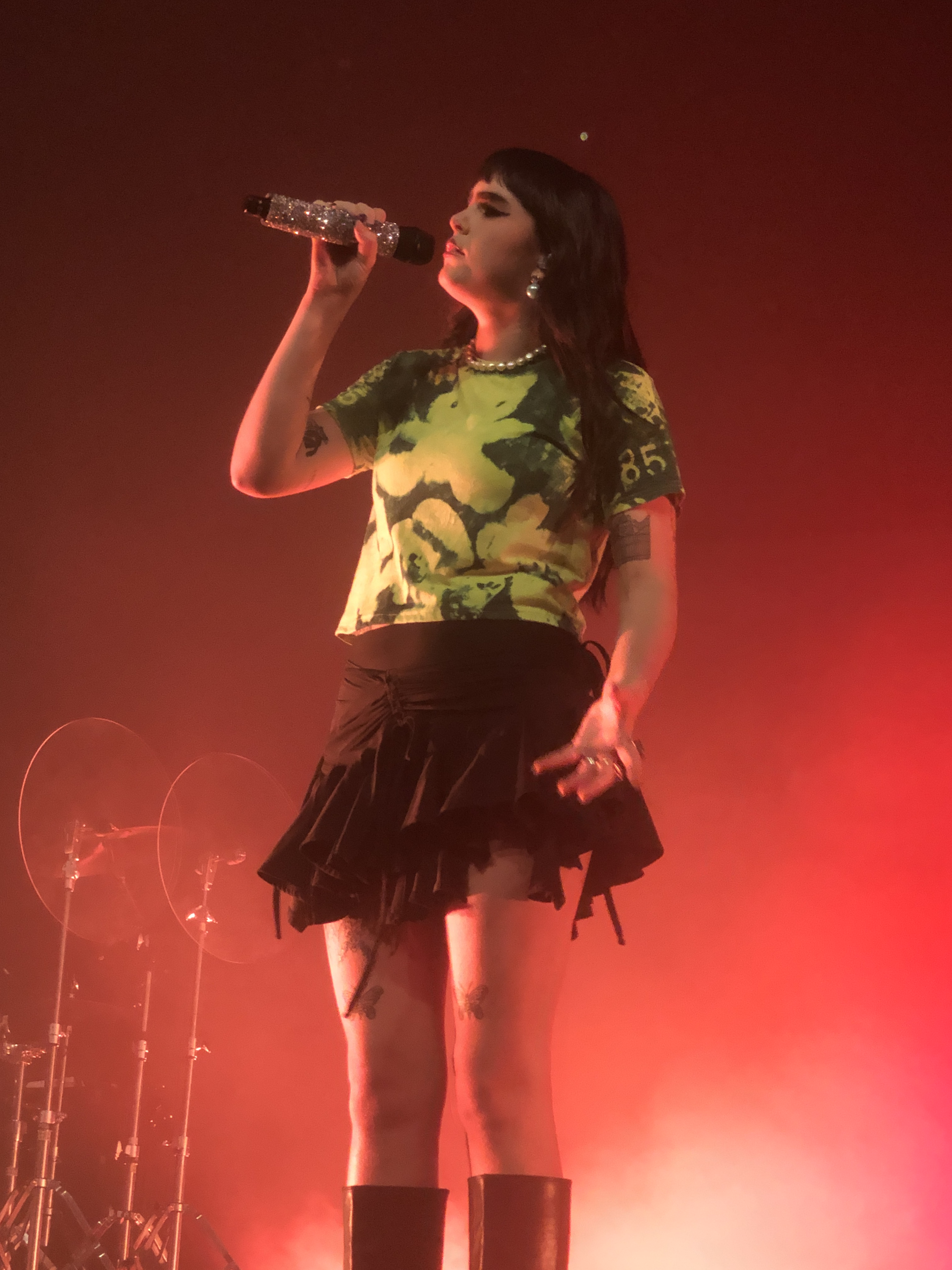
Benee performing in Sydney (2024)

=== Singles ===
"Night Garden" featuring British musician Bakar and American producer Kenny Beats was released on 15 July 2020 as the album's official lead single. "Snail" was released on 10 August 2020 and served the album's second single. Both "Night Garden" and "Snail" received music videos to support their release. "Plain" was released on 27 October 2020 as the third single, but did not receive a music video to support its release. "Kool" was released as the fourth single from the album, along with a music video.

Hey U X also includes the song "Supalonely" featuring Gus Dapperton, which served as the third single from the 2019 EP Stella & Steve, and achieved mainstream international success following its popularization on the social media platform TikTok in early 2020.

=== Tour ===
Shortly after the announcement of Olive, Benee embarked on a national headlining arena tour of New Zealand after the country had reported no cases of COVID-19. She performed eight shows across four cities, with the final show at Spark Arena selling out all 12,000 seats and becoming the first sold-out concert at the venue to be livestreamed to ticketholders.

== Composition ==
Benee revealed to Uproxx that the album "infus[es] elements of 'hardcore' electronic [music] with trap-style beats"., as well as adding indie guitar to the mix, ‘blending everything and making a fresh new soup’.

== Critical reception ==
Professional ratings
Aggregate scores
Source	Rating
AnyDecentMusic?	7.6/10
Metacritic	78/100
Review scores
Source	Rating
DIY	4/5 stars
Financial Times	4/5 stars
Gigwise	7.0/10
The Independent	4/5 stars
The Line of Best Fit	8.0/10
MusicOMH	4/5 stars
NME	4/5 stars
The Observer	4/5 stars
Pitchfork	6.4/10

Hey U X received mostly positive reviews. At Metacritic, which assigns a normalised score out of 100 to ratings from publications, the album received an average score of 78 based on 10 reviews, indicating "generally favorable reviews". Radio New Zealand ranked the album at number 16 on their list of the 20 best albums of 2020.

== Track listing ==
Hey U X track listing
No.	Title	Writer(s)	Producer(s)	Length
1.	"Happen to Me"	Stella Bennett; Joshua Fountain	Fountain	3:51
2.	"Same Effect"	Bennett; Fountain; Jason Schoushkoff	Fountain; Djeisan Suskov	4:04
3.	"Sheesh" (featuring Grimes)	Bennett; Fountain; Claire Boucher	Fountain	3:33
4.	"Supalonely" (featuring Gus Dapperton)	Bennett; Jenna Andrews; Fountain; Brendan Patrick Rice	Fountain	3:43
5.	"Snail"	Bennett; Fountain	Fountain	3:00
6.	"Plain" (featuring Lily Allen and Flo Milli)	Bennett; Andrews; Fountain; Schoushkoff; Lily Allen; Tamia Carter	Fountain; Suskov	3:52
7.	"Kool"	Bennett; Fountain; Schoushkoff	Fountain; Suskov	2:48
8.	"Winter" (featuring Mallrat)	Bennett; Andrews; Fountain; Jonah Christian; Grace Shaw	Fountain; Christian	3:07
9.	"A Little While"	Bennett	Fountain	3:18
10.	"Night Garden" (featuring Kenny Beats and Bakar)	Bennett; Kenneth Blume; Bakar Shariff	Kenny Beats	3:41
11.	"All the Time" (featuring Muroki)	Bennett; Fountain; Christian	Fountain; Christian	3:08
12.	"If I Get to Meet You"	Bennett; Fountain	Fountain	3:02
13.	"C U"	Bennett; Fountain; Schoushkoff	Fountain; Suskov	3:00
Total length:				44:07

CD edition hidden track
No.	Title	Writer(s)	Length
1.	"Make You Sick"	Bennett; Fountain	9:46

== Personnel ==
Credits adapted from the liner notes of Hey U X.

Musicians

- Benee – vocals (1–13), guitar (9, 12, 13), bass (12)
- Josh Fountain – programming (1–9, 11–13)
- Felix Holton – drums (1, 11)
- Tiare Kelly – guitar (1, 9, 12)
- Claire Cowan – cello (2)
- Djeisan Suskov – bass (2, 11), guitar (2, 6, 7, 11, 13)
- Grimes – vocals, programming (3)
- Gus Dapperton – vocals (4)
- Lily Allen – vocals (6)
- Jenna Andrews – backing vocals (6)
- Flo Milli – vocals (6)
- Jonah Christian – programming (8)
- Mallrat – vocals (8)
- Bakar – vocals (10)
- Kenny Beats – programming (10)
- Muroki – vocals (11)

Technical

- Josh Fountain – production (1–9, 11–13)
- Simon Gooding – recording (1, 11)
- Randy Merrill – mastering (1–9, 11–13)
- Spike Stent – mixing (1–8, 12, 13)
- Grimes – co-production (3)
- Jenna Andrews – vocal production (6)
- Jonah Christian – co-production (8)
- Benee – co-production (9)
- Dilip Harris – mixing (9, 11)
- David Becker – mastering (10)
- Jeff Ellis – mixing (10)
- Kenny Beats – production (10)

== Charts ==
Chart performance for Hey U X
Chart (2020)	Peak position
Australian Albums (ARIA)	22
New Zealand Albums (RMNZ)	2
