= Jenna Andrews =

Canadian singer, songwriter, and record producer

- Born: 1985 or 1986 (age 40–41); Calgary, Alberta, Canada
- Genres: Pop; R&B; folk
- Occupations: Singer; songwriter; record producer; A&R consultant
- Years active: 2010–present
- Labels: Records; Columbia; Island Def Jam
- Website: thejennaandrews.com

Jenna Lauren Andrews (born 1985 or 1986) is a Canadian singer, songwriter and record producer from Calgary, Alberta. She released her debut single "Tumblin' Down" in 2010, which was featured on the television show, Grey's Anatomy and charted on Billboard's Adult R&B Songs. She has collaborated with artists such as BTS, Drake, Sabrina Carpenter, Jennifer Lopez, Jessie J, Tori Kelly, Lily Allen, and Little Mix, while also being involved as an A&R consultant for Barry Weiss' label RECORDS, with whom she's also co-founded the publishing company TwentySeven Music Publishing.

== Early life ==
Jenna Lauren Andrews was born in Calgary, Alberta, Canada. Her mother was an elementary school teacher and her father was a professor at the University of Calgary. She aspired to become a musician at a young age after listening to Mariah Carey and Billie Holiday. Her early musical influences were inspired by her mother's love of R&B and soul music, as Andrews learned how to play the piano at the age of 5 despite not coming from a musical family. She wrote her first song at the age of 14 titled "What Am I Gonna Do", and interned at media companies such as Lite 96 FM and CTV. While attending Dr. E.P. Scarlett High School, Andrews studied music and dance, where she also co-hosted pep rallies with eventual singer Jocelyn Alice. She eventually went to Mount Royal University to study broadcast journalism, eventually deciding to move to Vancouver after six months in order to focus on becoming a full-time musician.

== Career ==
=== 2010–2013: Solo career ===
Andrews was discovered by Chris Smith, the manager of Nelly Furtado and Alessia Cara, after hearing her song "Adore" on MySpace in 2005. She wrote the song for her parents after having no money to buy Christmas presents seven months after moving to Vancouver. In 2008, Andrews was offered a production deal with Island Def Jam when Smith introduced her to American producer L.A. Reid. She released her debut single "Tumblin' Down" in 2010, which was featured on the sixth season of American medical drama television series Grey's Anatomy. On 22 October 2012, Andrews released an extended play titled Kiss and Run. She also released another EP exclusively on Rap-Up titled SexTape on 9 May 2013, which contained covers of songs including Usher's "Climax" (2012), The-Dream's "Rockin' That Shit" (2008), and Jeremih's "Birthday Sex" (2009).

=== 2014–present: Transition to songwriting and production ===
After the release of SexTape, Andrews decided to focus on becoming a full-time songwriter, admitting that she was stuck in purgatory artistically and professionally. She worked together with Canadian R&B duo Majid Jordan on their 2014 debut EP A Place Like This as her first project. Andrews first encountered then 14 year old Lennon Stella on the set of 2012 television series Nashville, where she found her passion for developing young artists. In early 2016, Andrews announced that she had signed as a songwriter for Sony/ATV Music Publishing. In February 2018, Andrews joined former Island Def Jam president Barry Weiss' record label Records as an exclusive A&R consultant, signing Stella as an artist for the label and being persuaded by Weiss to add Noah Cyrus. She continued to develop other artists such as Zhavia Ward and Lauren Jauregui, while continuing to write and produce songs for Drake, Jennifer Lopez, Jessie J, Tori Kelly, and Lily Allen.

On 4 April 2019, Andrews and Weiss announced TwentySeven Music Publishing, which was a joint venture between the two. Two of the earliest members to join were Jade Thirlwall and Leigh-Anne Pinnock, both members of Little Mix, as they signed a worldwide publishing deal with Sony/ATV. Andrews offered them a deal to join after she found out that they never had a publishing deal during vocal production of "Motivate" from their fifth album LM5 (2018). She also began working with New Zealand singer Stella Rose Bennett, known as Benee, writing "Supalonely" in 2019. Andrews vocal produced the Grammy-nominated South Korean boy band BTS song "Dynamite", which was released on 21 August 2020. She worked on the band members' vocal production in three weeks, which were remotely recorded from South Korea. Andrews also vocally produced the BTS remix of the 2020 Jason Derulo and Jawsh 685 song "Savage Love (Laxed – Siren Beat)", and co-wrote and vocally produced the 2021 BTS song "Butter". In 2021, Andrews co-wrote the David Guetta, Galantis and Little Mix song "Heartbreak Anthem". She assisted in the production of Dixie's debut studio album A Letter to Me (2022), as a songwriter and executive producer. In 2023 she started a new publishing venture, “Jennasis music” alongside her partner Stephen Kirk, “Sixteen sound”, in partnership with Warner Chappell."

In 2025, Andrews appeared on the Netflix music docu-reality series Hitmakers. Andrews and Stephen Kirk also contributed to the soundtrack for animated film, K-Pop Demon Hunters.

In 2026, Andrews and Stephen Kirk launched their own record label called "Graffiti Sound" signing artists like Mattie Pruitt from season 23 of American Idol.

== Musical style and influences ==
Andrews has been described as a pop, R&B, and folk artist. She has been influenced by a range of artists including Donny Hathaway, Billie Holiday, Aaliyah, Massive Attack, Portishead, Carly Simon, and Carole King.

== Other ventures ==
During the COVID-19 pandemic in 2020, Andrews began hosting a web series titled The Green Room, which appears on Dash Radio and is produced in partnership with The Jed Foundation and She Is The Music. The series features artists and songwriters who discuss topics such as mental health and music. Andrews initially conceived the idea in 2019, after experiencing anxiety, bullying, and an eating disorder in her childhood.

== Discography ==
=== Extended plays ===
List of extended plays, with selected details
Title	Album details
Kiss and Run	Released: 22 October 2012; Label: Island Def Jam, 21 Music; Formats: Digital download
SexTape	Released: 9 May 2013; Label: Island Def Jam, 21 Music; Formats: Digital download

=== Singles ===
List of singles as lead artist, with selected chart positions, showing year released and album name
Title	Year	Peak chart positions	Album
Title	Year	US Adult R&B	Album
"Tumblin' Down"	2010	27	Non-album single
"Kiss and Run"	2012	—	Kiss and Run
"Weapon"	2012	—	Kiss and Run
"Unhappy Ending"	2013	—	Kiss and Run
"—" denotes releases that did not chart.

=== Featured appearances ===
List of non-single guest appearances, with other performing artists, showing year released and album name
Title	Year	Album
"One Thing" (Lapalux featuring Jenna Andrews)	2013	Nostalchic
"Repetition" (Redlight featuring Jenna Andrews)	2015	X Colour
"Sweat" (Cash Cash featuring Jenna Andrews)	2016	Blood, Sweat & 3 Years

=== Songwriting and production credits ===
Title	Year	Artist(s)	Album	Credits	Written with	Produced with
"Midnight Angel"	2012	Hitomi	∞	Co-writer	Chad Royce, Scott Mann, Matt Kramer	—
"One Thing"	2013	Lapalux, Jenna Andrews	Nostalchic	Featured artist/Co-writer	Stuart Howard	—
"Walking Away"	2013	Sick Puppies	Connect	Co-writer	Shimon Moore, Emma Anazi	—
"I Want You Back"	2013	Yuna	Nocturnal	Co-writer	Yunalis Zarai	—
"Goodbye"	2014	Girls' Generation	Mr. Mr. EP	Co-writer	Lindy Robbins, Brent Paschke	—
"A Place Like This"	2014	Majid Jordan	A Place Like This EP	Co-writer	Majid Al Maskati, Jordan Ullman	—
"Run"	2014	Marsha Ambrosius	Friends & Lovers	Co-writer	Marsha Ambrosius, Dillon Pace	—
"Forever"	2014	Majid Jordan	A Place Like This EP	Co-writer	Majid Al Maskati, Jordan Ullman	—
"U"	2014	Majid Jordan	A Place Like This EP	Co-writer/Additional producer	Majid Al Maskati, Jordan Ullman	Majid Jordan
"Personal"	2014	Jessie J	Sweet Talker	Co-writer	Gabrielle Varner, William Wiik Larsen	—
"You & the 6"	2015	Drake	If You're Reading This It's; Too Late	Co-writer	Aubrey Graham, Anderson Hernandez, Allen Ritter, Matthew Samuels, Noah "40" Shebib, Ramond Ibanga Jr., Majid Al Maskati, Jordan Ullman	—
"You Give Me Something"	2015	Tamia	Love Life	Co-writer	Tamia Hill, Dillon Pace, Rory Andrew	—
"Rise"	2015	Tamia	Love Life	Co-writer	Tamia Hill, Dillon Pace, Rory Andrew	—
"Bottled Up"	2015	Tori Kelly	Unbreakable Smile	Co-writer	Victoria Kelly, Charles Harmon	—
"현기증 (Vertigo)"	2015	TVXQ	Rise as God	Co-writer	Maxwell Schneider, Dillon Pace	—
"Live Forever"	2015	The Band Perry	Non-album single	Co-writer	Kimberly Perry, Neil Perry, Reid Perry, Nadir Khayat, Jakke Erixson, Karl-Ola Kjellholm	—
"Bring Me to Life"	2015	Skylar Stecker, Kalin and Myles	This Is Me	Co-writer	Skylar Stecker, Nadir Khayat, Jakke Erixson, Kalin White, Myles Parrish	—
"Submarine"	2015	Cal Scruby, Sevyn Streeter	House in the Hills	Co-writer	Callum Scruby, Thomas Meredith, Mason Levy, Chandra Uber, Amber Streeter	—
"Repetition"	2015	Redlight, Jenna Andrews	X Colour	Featured artist/Co-writer	Hugh Pescod	—
"Make It Work"	2016	Majid Jordan	Majid Jordan	Co-writer/Vocal producer	Majid Al Maskati, Jordan Ullman, Andrea Landis, Dillon Pace	Majid Jordan
"Control"	2016	SoMo	The Answers	Co-writer	Joseph Somers-Morales, Michael Holmes, Jordan Evans	—
"All About Us"	2016	Jordan Fisher	Jordan Fisher EP	Co-writer	Francesco Yates, Rory Andrew, Dillon Pace	—
"Cruel Life"	2016	Jule Vera	Waiting on the Sun	Co-writer	Anesley Newman, Bryan Fryzel	—
"Sweat"	2016	Cash Cash, Jenna Andrews	Blood, Sweat & 3 Years	Featured artist/Co-writer	Samuel Frisch, Alexander Makhlouf, Jean Paul Makhlouf	—
"Mind Games"	2016	Banks	The Altar	Co-writer	Jillian Banks, Christopher Taylor, Timothy Anderson	—
"Weaker Girl"	2016	Banks	The Altar	Co-writer	Jillian Banks, Tim Anderson, Trevor Lawrence Jr., Aron Forbes	—
"Mother Earth"	2016	Banks	The Altar	Co-writer	Jillian Banks	—
"Jupiter"	2016	Michael Brun, Roy English, Uni	Non-album single	Co-writer	Michael Brun, Nylo, Brandon Wronski, Roy English	—
"Stay in the Dark"	2017	The Band Perry	My Bad Imagination	Co-writer	Kimberly Perry, Neil Perry, Reid Perry, Benny Cassette	—
"Curve"	2017	SoMo	The Answers	Co-writer	Joseph Somers-Morales, Donald Tarpley Jr.	—
"Don't Love Me"	2017	Janine	99	Co-writer	Janine Foster, Cecil Bernardy, Jonathan Dorr, Kerry Brothers Jr.	—
"Stay Together"	2017	Noah Cyrus	Non-album singles	Additional producer	—	Digital Farm Animals, Hudson Mohawke
"I'm Stuck"	2017	Noah Cyrus	Non-album singles	Co-writer/Vocal producer	Noah Cyrus, Timothy McKenzie, Samuel Romans	Labrinth
"Friends"	2017	Janine	Non-album singles	Co-writer	Janine Foster, Cecil Bernardy, Jonathan Dorr, Kerry Brothers Jr.	—
"Falling for a Lullaby"	2017	FEMM	"My Revolution / Kon'ya wa Boogie Back (Nice Vocal)" (single)	Co-writer	Felicia D Barton, Alex Suarez, Ryan Wilson	—
"All Falls Down"	2017	Alan Walker, Noah Cyrus, Digital Farm Animals	Different World	Vocal producer	—	Alan Walker, Mood Melodies, the Six, Gunnar Greve, Chris "TEK" O'Ryan, Alex Holmberg
"Slow"	2017	Matoma, Noah Cyrus	One in a Million	Producer	—	Matoma, Jayson DeZuzio, MAG, Scott Robinson
"My Way"	2017	One Bit, Noah Cyrus	Non-album single	Producer	—	One Bit, Joe Ashworth
"On a Body Like You"	2018	Felix Jaehn, Rachel Salvit	I	Co-writer	Felix Jaehn, Rachel Salvit, James Nosanow	—
"Team"	2018	Noah Cyrus, Max	Non-album single	Co-writer/Producer	Noah Cyrus, Maxwell Schneider, Mike Elizondo, Emily Weisband	Mike Elizondo
"Numb"	2018	Janine	99	Co-writer	Janine Foster, Cecil Bernardy, Jonathan Dorr	—
"Everything to Feel Something"	2018	Lily Allen	No Shame	Co-writer	Lily Cooper, Benjamin Garrett, Eliza Caird	—
"Lately"	2018	Noah Cyrus, Tanner Alexander	Non-album single	Producer	—	Tanner Alexander
"Deep Down"	2018	Zhavia Ward	17	Co-writer	Carisa Zhavia Ward, D. Arcelious Harris, Elijah Bliss Dias, Guy Hershko, Maxx Moore, Billy Foster, Ellington Jordan, Etta James	—
"Wanted"	2018	Tyler Shaw	Intuition	Co-writer	Tyler Shaw, Alexander Vujic	—
"Mad at You"	2018	Noah Cyrus, Gallant	Good Cry EP	Producer	—	Kid Harpoon
"Punches"	2018	Noah Cyrus, LP	Good Cry EP	Co-writer	Noah Cyrus, Joseph Janiak	—
"Sadness"	2018	Noah Cyrus	Good Cry EP	Producer	—	Rob Grimaldi
"Fly Away with Me" (신기루 shingiru)	2018	NCT 127	Regular-Irregular	Co-writer	Kang Eun-jung, Hwang Yoo-bin, Rory Andrew, Francesco Yates, Dylan Pace-Rodriguez	—
"Remember"	2018	Gryffin, Zohara	Gravity	Co-writer	Daniel Griffith, Rachel Salvit, Deiderik van Elsas, Parrish Washington	—
"PRFCT"	2018	Sabrina Carpenter	Singular: Act I	Co-writer	Sabrina Carpenter, Robert Persaud	—
"Love a Girl Right"	2018	Little Mix	LM5	Vocal producer	—	Chris Loco, Joe Kearns, Kamille
"American Boy"	2018	Little Mix	LM5	Vocal producer	—	The Six, Louis Bell, Aaron Hibell
"Motivate"	2018	Little Mix	LM5	Co-writer/Vocal producer	Leigh-Anne Pinnock, Jade Thirlwall, Perrie Edwards, James Norton, Hanni Ibrahim, Patrick Patrikios, Javier Gonzalez	Loosechange, Yei, S1, Jameil Aossey, Lonestarrmuzik, Joe Kearns
"Notice"	2018	Little Mix	LM5	Vocal producer	—	Mike Sabath, John Hill, Joe Kearns
"The Cure"	2018	Little Mix	LM5	Vocal producer	—	TMS, Joe Kearns
"Forget You Not"	2018	Little Mix	LM5	Vocal producer	—	Jorgan Odegard, Electric, Kamille, Joe Kearns
"The Cure (Stripped)"	2018	Little Mix	LM5	Vocal producer	—	TMS, Joe Kearns
"Hold On to Me"	2019	Jacob and Fanny	Non-album single	Co-writer	Fanny Miller, Jacob Miller	—
"Edit You"	2019	Kream, Stela Cole	Non-album single	Co-writer	Stela Cole, James Norton, Daniel Slettebakken, Marcus Slettebakken	—
"Too Proud"	2019	Broods	Don't Feed the Pop Monster	Co-writer	Joel Little, Caleb Nott, Georgia Nott	—
"I Like the Way"	2019	Moon Willis, Etta Bond	Non-album single	Co-writer	Jason Julian, Hira King, Rachel Salvit, Moon Willis	—
"EZ"	2019	Zhavia Ward	17	Co-writer	Zhavia Ward, Chauncey Alexander Hollis, Darhyl Camper, Paul Edwin Shelton	—
"Make Me Miss You"	2019	Emily Weisband	Identity Crisis	Co-writer	Mike Elizondo, Alysa Vanderheym, Emily Weisband	—
"July Remix (featuring Leon Bridges)"	2019	Noah Cyrus, Leon Bridges	Non-album single	Co-writer	Peter Harding, Noah Cyrus, Mike Sonier	—
"Looking Out for You" (不亏不欠 Bù kuī bù qiàn)	2019	Tia Ray	1212	Recording	—	The Rascals, Tia Ray, Khristopher Riddick-Tynes
"Supalonely"	2019	Benee, Gus Dapperton	Stella & Steve	Co-writer	Stella Bennett, Josh Fountain, Brendan Rice	—
"Blu"	2019	Benee	Stella & Steve	Co-writer	Stella Bennett, Josh Fountain	—
"Kissing Other People"	2020	Lennon Stella	Three. Two. One.	Vocal producer	—	Cody Tarpley, Ruslan Lov
"Dynamite"	2020	BTS	Non-album single	Vocal producer	—	—
"Savage Love (Laxed – Siren Beat)" [BTS Remix]	2020	Jason Derulo, Jawsh 685, BTS	Non-album single	Vocal producer	—	—
"Holiday"	2020	Lil Nas X	Montero	Vocal producer	—	Take a Daytrip
"Winter"	2020	Benee	Hey U X	Co-writer	BENEE, Josh Fountain, Jonah Christian & Mallrat	—
"Plain"	2020	Benee ft. Lily Allen & Flo Milli	Hey U X	Co-writer/Vocal producer	BENEE, Josh Fountain, Djeisan Suskov, Lily Allen & Flo Milli	—
"Made"	2020	Sophia Messa ft. Pink Sweat$	Non-album single	Co-writer/Vocal producer	David Bowden (Poet), Anthony Rossomando, Parrish Warrington, Vaughn Elsas, Rook Monroe, Sophia Messa	—
"Ice Cream & Cigarettes"	2020	Sophia Messa	Non-album single	Co-writer/Vocal producer	—	—
"Vintage"	2021	Blu DeTiger	How Did We Get Here?	Vocal producer	—	—
"Love Songs"	2021	Maggie Lindemann	Paranoia	Co-writer	Maggie Lindemann, Cody Tarpley	—
"Different"	2021	Maggie Lindemann	Paranoia	Co-writer	Joseph Somers-Morales, Annika Wells, Cody Tarpley, Maggie Lindemann	—
"Butter"	2021	BTS	Non-album single	Co-writer	Ron Perry, Sebastian Garcia, Alex Bilowitz, RM, Stephen Kirk, Rob Grimaldi	—
"Heartbreak Anthem"	2021	Galantis, David Guetta, Little Mix	Non-album single	Co-writer	Bloodshy, Henrik Jonback, David Saint Fleur, Thom Bridges, David Guetta, VodKa, YK Koi, Lorenzo Cosi, Perrie Edwards, Leigh-Anne Pinnock, Jade Thirlwall, Sorana, Johnny Goldstein	—
"Serial Monogamist"	2021	Ashe	Ashlyn	Co-writer	Big Taste, Ashe	—
"Always Been You"	2021	Jessie Murph	Non-album single	Co-writer	Jessie Murph, Stephen Kirk, Steven Franks	—
"Permission to Dance"	2021	BTS	Non-album single	Co-writer	Ed Sheeran, Steve Mac, Johnny McDaid, Stephen Kirk	—
"Sobriety"	2021	Jessie Murph	Non-album single	Co-writer	Constance Smith, Jessie Murph, Stephen Kirk	—
"Wishes"	2022	Jamie Miller	Snowdrop (Original Television Soundtrack, Pt. 4)	Vocal producer	Jamie Miller, J.UNA	—
"Church"	2022	Jennifer Lopez	Marry Me	Co-writer	Bekuh Boom, Floyd Hills, William Larsen, Moses Sumney, Elle Varner	—
"Pray"	2022	Jessie Murph	Non-album single	Co-writer	Stephen Kirk, Feli Ferraro, Gabe Simon, Jessie Murph	—
"Wild"	2022	Dixie	A Letter to Me	Co-writer	Dixie, Stephen Kirk	Stephen Kirk
"Girlfriend"	2022	Dixie	A Letter to Me	Co-writer	Lennon Stella, Stephen Kirk, Scott Harris, Mikkel Storleer Eriksen, Tor Erik Hermansen	—
"Both Ways" (featuring Stephen Kirk)	2022	Dixie	A Letter to Me	Co-writer	Dixie, Stephen Kirk	Stephen Kirk
"Fallout"	2022	Dixie	A Letter to Me	Co-writer	Lennon Stella, Will IDAP, Nate Cyphert, Stephen Kirk	Stephen Kirk
"Who I Am (Interlude)"	2022	Dixie	A Letter to Me	Co-writer	Brett James, Troy Verges	Stephen Kirk
"Stuck"	2022	Dixie	A Letter to Me	Co-writer	Joshua Bassett, Mike Sooner, Stephen Kirk, Alex Bilowitz	Stephen Kirk, Alex Bilowitz
"Not Enough"	2022	Dixie	A Letter to Me	Co-writer	Dixie, Stephen Kirk	Stephen Kirk
"Model"	2022	Dixie	A Letter to Me	Co-writer	Dixie, Stephen Kirk, Alex Bilowitz	Stephen Kirk, Alex Bilowitz
"Bye2You"	2022	Dixie	A Letter to Me	Co-writer	Asia Whiteacre, Nate Miles, Dylan Guthro, Stephen Kirk	Stephen Kirk
"Good Parts (When the Quality Is Bad but I Am)	2022	Le Sserafim	Antifragile	Composer	Score (13), Megatone (13), Sir Nolan, Alex Bilowitz, Salem Ilese, Danke (Lalala Studio), Sakura Miyawaki, Cha Yu-bin, Huh Yun-jin	—
"Dime"	2023	Roy Woods	Mixed Emotions	Co-Writer	C. Green, C. McEvoy-Morie, D. Anthony, D. Spencer, S. Kirk, T.Williams	T-Minus
"Too Much"	2023	The Kid Laroi	THE FIRST TIME	Vocal Producer	Billy Walsh, Blake Slatkin, Omer Fedi, Central Cee, Charlton Howard, Emile Haynie, Jasper Harris, Justin Bieber	Stephen Kirk, Omer Fedi, Jasper Harris, Emile Haynie, Blake Slatkin
"Shape of Me"	2023	Rita Ora	You & I	Co-writer	Alex Niceforo, Keith Sorrells, Rita Ora, Rollo, Warren Felder	Alex Niceforo, Keith Sorrells, Mark Ralphs, Oak Felder
"Karma"	2024	JoJo Siwa	Karma	Vocal Producer	Antonina Armato, Desmond Child, Time James	Rock Mafia
"Showstopper"	2024	Nelly Furtado	7	Co-writer	Nelly Furtado, Ebony Oshunrinde, Nevis Gahunia, Stephen Kirk, Herag Sanbalian	—
"Corazón"	2024	Nelly Furtado, Bomba Estéreo	7	Co-writer	Nelly Furtado, Tyler Williams, Nevis Gahunia, Stephen Kirk, Steven Bilodeau, Liliana Saumet, Oliver Cazier	—
"Call My Name"	2024	Tones And I	Beautifully Ordinary	Co-writer and Co-producer	Stephen Kirk, Toni Watson	Randy Belculfine, Toni Watson, Stephen Kirk
"House On Fire"	2024	Mickey Guyton	House On Fire	Co-writer	Stephen Kirk, Mickey Guyton	Stephen Kirk, Nolan Verner
"Make 'Em Like You"	2024	Mickey Guyton	House On Fire	Co-writer	Mickey Guyton, Stephen Kirk	Stephen Kirk, Nolan Verner
"Heal"	2025	Jamal Roberts	Heal	Co-producer	—	Stephen Kirk
"Free"	2025	Andrew Choi, Ejae, Jinu, KPop Demon Hunters Cast, Rumi	KPop Demon Hunters (Soundtrack from the Netflix Film)	Co-writer and Co-producer	Mark Sonnenblick, Stephen Kirk	Stephen Kirk, Ian Eisendrath
"What It Sounds Like"	2025	Audrey Nuna, Ejae, Huntrix, KPop Demon Hunters Cast, Rei Ami	KPop Demon Hunters (Soundtrack from the Netflix Film)	Co-writer and Co-producer	Mark Sonnenblick, Stephen Kirk	Stephen Kirk, Ian Eisendrath
"Woman's Work"	2025	Jolin Tsai	Pleasure	Co-writer and Co-producer	Jolin Tsai, Stephen Eric Kirk, Joe Kirk	Stephen Eric Kirk

Billy Walsh, Blake Slatkin, Omer Fedi, Central Cee, Charlton Howard, Emile Haynie, Jasper Harris, Justin Bieber
