= Muroki =

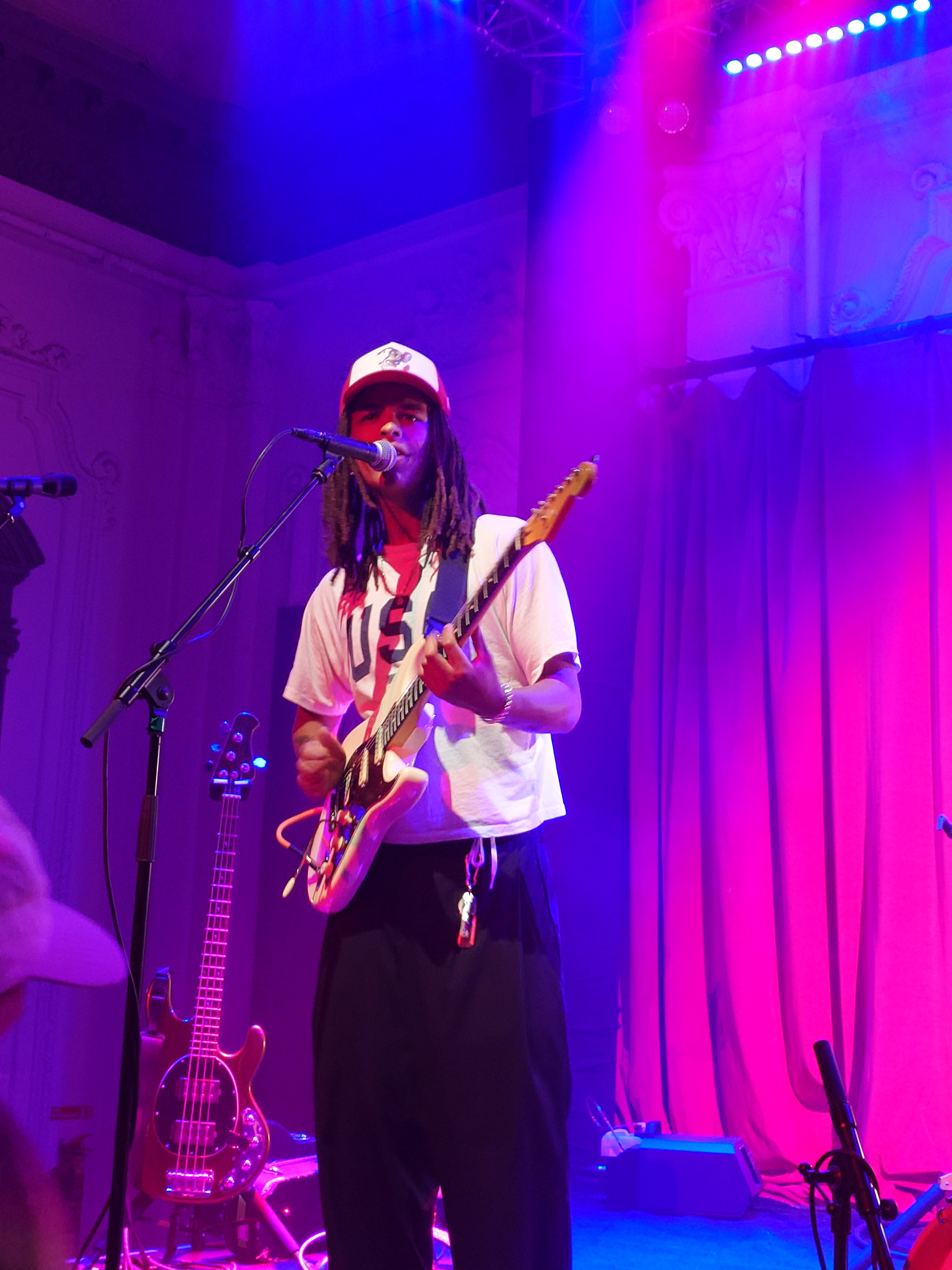
- Muroki performing in 2024

Background information
- Born: Muroki Mbote Wa Githinji; 2001 (age 24–25)
- Genres: Reggae; pop; jazz; R&B; Hip hop
- Occupations: Singer; songwriter; musician
- Instruments: Vocals; bass
- Years active: 2017–present
- Label: Independent Artist

Muroki Mbote Wa Githinji (born 2001), known mononymously as Muroki, is a Kenyan-New Zealand soul-pop musician. A member of the bands Cloak Bay and Masaya, Muroki debuted as a solo musician in 2019. In 2021, Muroki's song "Wavy" became a hit single in New Zealand.

== Biography ==
Muroki grew up in Raglan, New Zealand, and attended Hamilton Boys' High School. At 14 he decided he wanted to become a musician. Together with Lennox Reynolds, the pair formed the group Cloak Bay, releasing their debut extended play Digi Town and the Boogie Boys in 2017. In 2019, Muroki began releasing music as the bassist for the band Masaya.

In 2019, Muroki released his debut solo single "For Better or Worse", which caught the attention of New Zealand musician Benee, who played it during her appearance on Elton John's podcast Rocket Hour. Benee later reached out to Muroki over Instagram, and asked him to perform as a supporting act of her New Zealand tour in late 2020. In October 2020, Benee signed Muroki as the first musician on Olive Records, her personal imprint label.

In April 2021, Muroki released Dawn, an extended play he had been working on for a year alongside producers Josh Fountain and Djeisan Suskov. The lead single from the EP, "Wavy", became a hit in New Zealand later in the year, and during Te Wiki o te Reo Māori Muroki released a Te Reo version of the song, entitled "Rehurehu".

Muroki released his third EP, "Timezones". Muroki described it as a "black soul record" which "speaks to the rainbow of emotions and experiences that I’ve endured throughout my relationship”.

== Discography ==
=== Extended plays ===
| Title | Album details | Peak chart positions |
| Title | Album details | NZ Artist |
|---|---|---|
| Dawn | Released: 16 April 2021; Label: Olive Records; Format: Digital download, streaming | 17 |
| Heading East | Released: 15 September 2022; Label: Olive Records; Format: Digital download, streaming | — |
| Timezones | Released: 7 March 2024; Label: Olive Records; Format: Digital download, streaming | 20 |

=== Singles ===
==== As lead artist ====
| Title | Year | Peak chart positions | | Certifications | Album |
| Title | Year | NZ | NZ Artist | Certifications | Album |
|---|---|---|---|---|---|
| "For Better or Worse" | 2019 | — | — | | Non-album single |
| "Light Me Up" | 2020 | — | — (Note: "Light Me Up" did not enter the New Zealand artists' top 20 chart, but peaked at number 7 on the Hot 20 NZ Singles Chart.) | | Dawn |
| "Wavy" | 2021 | 26 | 3 | RMNZ: Platinum | Dawn |
| "Crossroads" (featuring Rhys Rich) | 2021 | — | — (Note: "Crossroads" did not enter the New Zealand artists' top 20 chart, but peaked at number 20 on the Hot 20 NZ Singles Chart.) | | Dawn |
| "Surfin" | 2021 | — (Note: "Surfin" did not enter the New Zealand top 40 chart, but peaked at number 8 on the Hot 40 Singles Chart.) | — (Note: "Surfin" did not enter the New Zealand artists' top 20 chart, but peaked at number 1 on the Hot 20 NZ Singles Chart.) | | Non-album singles |
| "Still Care" (featuring Nasaya) | 2021 | — (Note: "Still Care" did not enter the New Zealand top 40 chart, but peaked at number 27 on the Hot 40 Singles Chart.) | — (Note: "Still Care" did not enter the New Zealand artists' top 20 chart, but peaked at number 9 on the Hot 20 NZ Singles Chart.) | | Non-album singles |
| "Find Me" | 2022 | — (Note: "Find Me" did not enter the New Zealand top 40 chart, but peaked at number 8 on the Hot 40 Singles Chart.) | — (Note: "Find Me" did not enter the New Zealand artists' top 20 chart, but peaked at number 1 on the Hot 20 NZ Singles Chart.) | | Heading East |
| "Simple Pleasures" | 2022 | — (Note: "Simple Pleasures" did not enter the New Zealand top 40 chart, but peaked at number 37 on the Hot 40 Singles Chart.) | — | | Heading East |
| "Sweet Lime" | 2023 | — (Note: "Sweet Lime" did not enter the New Zealand top 40 chart, but peaked at number 18 on the Hot 40 Singles Chart.) | — | | Non-album single |
| "Middle Ground" | 2023 | — | — | | Timezones |
| "Love Cocoon" (with Benee) | 2023 | — (Note: "Love Cocoon" did not enter the NZ Top 40 Singles Chart, but peaked at number 30 on the NZ Hot Singles Chart.) | — | | Timezones |
| "Bad Dreams" | 2024 | — | — | | Timezones |
"—" denotes a recording that did not chart.

==== As lead artist ====
| Title | Year | Peak chart positions | Album |
| Title | Year | NZ Artist Hot | Album |
|---|---|---|---|
| "Answer" (Flowidus featuring Muroki) | 2022 | 3 | Non-album single |

=== Other charted songs ===
| Title | Year | Peak chart positions | | Album |
| Title | Year | NZ Hot | NZ Artist | Album |
|---|---|---|---|---|
| "Rehurehu" (Note: "Rehurehu" is the Māori language version of "Wavy".) | 2021 | 7 | 17 | Non-album single |

=== Guest appearances ===
| Title | Year | Other artists | Album |
|---|---|---|---|
| "All the Time" | 2020 | Benee | Hey U X |
