= Find an Island =

2019 single by Benee

Single by Benee

from the EP Stella & Steve
- Released: 11 October 2019
- Length: 3:12
- Label: Republic
- Songwriters: Stella Bennett; Joshua Fountain; Djeisan Suskov
- Producers: Fountain; Suskov

Benee singles chronology
"Glitter" (2019)	"Find an Island" (2019)	"Monsta" (2019)

Music video
- "Find an Island" on YouTube

"Find an Island" is a song by New Zealand musician Benee. It was released as a single on 11 October 2019 as the lead single from Benee's second extended play Stella & Steve. The song peaked at number 83 on the Australian ARIA Charts, becoming her first charting single in that territory.

About the song, Benee told Coup de Main magazine "The song is about a tiny little argument I had with my guitar player Tia. We had some weird little bicker, and you know when you’re having a petty argument with a friend you don't want to swear at them or put them down or anything, but I was like, 'What would I say?' It'd be like, 'Find an island, go somewhere else'."

== Critical reception ==
Helen Ehrlich from Affinity Magazine said with "Find an Island", Benee "continues her pattern of dropping poppy and punchy songs". Ehrlich said the song is a "swinging and sultry song about removing negative people from your mind and life." Andrew Drever from Sydney Morning Herald called the song a "tropical slow-burner". In the EP review, Nathan Gunn from Tone Deaf described the song as "a cruisy summer track".

== Charts ==
Chart performance for "Find an Island"
Chart (2019)	Peak position
Australia (ARIA)	83
New Zealand Hot Singles (RMNZ)	4

== Certifications ==
Certifications for "Find an Island"
Region	Certification	Certified units/sales
Australia (ARIA)	Platinum	70,000^{‡}
New Zealand (RMNZ)	Platinum	30,000^{‡}
^{‡} Sales+streaming figures based on certification alone.
