= Stella & Steve =

EP by Benee
- Released: 15 November 2019
- Genre: Electronic; R&B; pop
- Length: 17:24
- Label: Republic
- Producer: Joshua Fountain (Note: All tracks); Gus Dapperton (Note: Track 2); Djeisan Suskov

Benee chronology
Fire on Marzz (2019)	Stella & Steve (2019)	Hey U X (2020)

Singles from Stella & Steve
- 1. "Find an Island" Released: 11 October 2019; 2. "Monsta" Released: 1 November 2019; 3. "Supalonely" Released: 6 December 2019

Stella & Steve is the second extended play by New Zealand singer Benee, released on 15 November 2019 by Republic Records.

It was supported by three singles; "Find an Island", "Monsta", and "Supalonely", featuring Gus Dapperton, which the latter went viral on social networking service TikTok in 2020. Commercially, Stella & Steve peaked at number 19 on the New Zealand Albums Chart and the ARIA Albums Chart, number 91 on the Canadian Albums Chart, number 138 on the US Billboard 200, and number 150 on the French Albums Chart.

== Background ==
Detailing the inspiration behind the EP title, Bennett said: "I am Stella and my car is called Steve". Her car Steve, featured on the cover, is a Honda Integra DC2, which also serves as the namesake for the track Green Honda.

== Promotion ==
The lead single, "Find an Island", was released on 11 October 2019.

The second single, "Monsta", was released on 1 November 2019.

The EP's third and final single, "Supalonely", featuring Gus Dapperton, was released on 6 December 2019.

== Critical reception ==
Gab Ginsberg from Billboard described the EP as "a tight handful of R&B and electronic-tinged pop tracks that showcase where she is here and now" and "serving as a more chill companion to the bubbly Fire on Marzz EP."

Nathan Gunn of Tone Deaf called the EP "Benee's most emotional and well-constructed work, which becomes especially apparent in latter tracks like 'Drifting' and 'Blu'."

== Track listing ==
No.	Title	Writer(s)	Producer(s)	Length
1.	"Find an Island"	Stella Rose Bennett; Joshua Fountain; Jason Schoushkoff	Fountain; Djeisan Suskov	3:12
2.	"Supalonely" (featuring Gus Dapperton)	Bennett; Jenna Andrews; Fountain; Brendan Patrick Rice	Fountain; Dapperton	3:43
3.	"Monsta"	Bennett; Fountain; Schoushkoff	Fountain; Suskov	3:41
4.	"Drifting" (featuring Jack Berry)	Bennett; Damin McCabe; Fountain; Schoushkoff	Fountain; Suskov	3:23
5.	"Blu"	Bennett; Andrews; Fountain	Fountain	3:22
Total length:				17:24

== Personnel ==
Adapted from the Fire on Marzz / Stella & Steve compilation album's liner notes.

=== Musicians ===
- Stella Rose Bennett – writing, vocals (1–5)

Other musicians

- Josh Fountain – writing (1–5)
- Djeisan Suskov – writing (1, 4)
- Brendan Patrick Rice – writing, vocals (2)
- Jenna Andrews – writing (2, 5)
- Jason Schoushkoff – writing (3)
- Damin McCabe – writing (4)

=== Technical ===
- Josh Fountain – production (1–5)
- Gus Dapperton – production (2)
- Spike Stent – mixing (1–5)
- Randy Merrill – mastering (1–5)

== Charts ==
2019–2020 chart performance for Stella and Steve
Chart (2019–2020)	Peak position
Australian Albums (ARIA)	19
Canadian Albums (Billboard)	91
French Albums (SNEP)	150
New Zealand Albums (RMNZ)	19
US Billboard 200	138

== Release history ==
Release history and formats for Stella & Steve
Region	Date	Format	Label	Ref.
Various	15 November 2019	Digital download; streaming	Republic	
