= Wavy =

Wavy may refer to:

- "Wavy" (Ty Dolla Sign song), 2016
- "Wavy" (Muroki song), 2021
- Wavy (album), by Lamin, 2026
- WAVY-TV, a TV station located in Portsmouth, Virginia, United States
- Wavy Gravy (born 1936), an American entertainer and activist
- Waviness, the measurement of the more widely spaced component of surface texture
- Wavy the Creator, recording artist
- Deschampsia flexuosa, commonly known as wavy hair-grass

== See also ==
- WayV, a Chinese boy band
- Wave (disambiguation)
