= Snail (song) =

2020 single by Benee

Single by Benee

from the album Hey U X
- Released: 10 August 2020
- Genre: Pop; electropop
- Length: 3:00
- Label: Republic
- Songwriters: Joshua Fountain; Stella Bennett
- Producer: Joshua Fountain

Benee singles chronology
"Night Garden" (2020)	"Snail" (2020)	"Plain" (2020)

"Snail" is a song by New Zealand singer-songwriter Benee, released through Republic Records on 10 August 2020 as the second single from her debut studio album Hey U X (2020). Developed amid the COVID-19 pandemic, the song was influenced by Benee's newfound interest in snails during the COVID-19 lockdown in New Zealand. "Snail" impacted Australian contemporary hit radio on 14 August 2020.

== Critical reception ==
"Snail" received critical acclaim. Lars Brandle of Billboard described "Snail" as "a cute, upbeat pop number", while James Rettig of Stereogum described it as "bright", "bouncy" and "optimistic". Michael Craag, writing for The Observer, called the track a "bouncy electro-pop opus". Tyler Jenke of Rolling Stone agreed that it was "upbeat" and "bouncy" and noted that as Benee "deliver[s] a feel-good chorus with enigmatic lyrics, the track feels almost made for the live stage, with its quirky delivery and enchanting composition." Jenke also praised the record and described it as one of her "finest songs to date". Mike Wass of Idolator described "Snail" as a "wonderfully demented pop song" and an "offbeat bop". Derrick Rossignol of Uproxx described it as a "thumping pop tune" which "is quite literally about snails, as [Benee] adopts a rhythmic and infectious cadence to sing on the chorus". Wren Graves of Consequence of Sound wrote that the song's hook "is as compact and memorable as a pom-squad cheer," while humorously wishing readers "good luck getting it out of your head."

== Music video ==
The accompanying music video was released on 8 October 2020 following prior announcement from Benee via social media. It was directed by Anita Fontaine and features what the singer herself described as "a weird fantasy story involving snails!"

== Live performances ==
Benee performed the song in a treehouse at her own home in Auckland as part of Vevo's "DSCVR at Home" video series amid the COVID-19 lockdown.

== Charts ==
Chart (2020)	Peak position
New Zealand Hot Singles (RMNZ)	6
New Zealand Artist Singles (RMNZ)	18
