= Supalonely =

2019 single by Benee

Single by Benee featuring Gus Dapperton

from the EP Stella & Steve
- Released: 15 November 2019
- Genre: Alt-pop; lo-fi disco; funk
- Length: 3:43
- Label: Republic
- Songwriters: Stella Bennett; Joshua Fountain; Brendan Rice; Jenna Andrews
- Producer: Fountain

Benee singles chronology
"Monsta" (2019)	"Supalonely" (2019)	"Lownely" (2020)

Gus Dapperton singles chronology
"Coax and Botany" (2019)	"Supalonely" (2019)	"First Aid" (2020)

Music video
- "Supalonely" on YouTube

"Supalonely" is a song by New Zealand singer Benee featuring American singer Gus Dapperton, released through Republic Records on 15 November 2019 as the third and final single from her second extended play Stella & Steve (2019). It also appears on Benee's debut studio album, Hey U X (2020). The song gained immense popularity on the online video-sharing platform TikTok in March 2020, gaining more than 6.9 billion plays for the month. It peaked on the top 40 in over 25 countries including the United Kingdom, the United States, Australia, Canada, France, Germany, The Netherlands and New Zealand, earning a gold certification in its second week in the latter.

The Straits Times also credited the success of "Supalonely" to be owed to those who resonated with the song's themes at the height of the COVID-19 pandemic lockdowns, which were ongoing at the time of the song's popularisation.

== Background ==
"Supalonely" was written during a month-long trip to Los Angeles. It was inspired by Benee's breaking up with her boyfriend, and was written as a song in which she could mock her own sadness. The song "Blu" from Stella & Steve was recorded the day after "Supalonely" during the Los Angeles trip, and was inspired by the same break-up.

Up to three versions of the song exist: the explicit version, the clean version which omits the word "fuck" and replaces the word "bitch" with "chick", and another that completely omits Gus Dapperton's verses and skips straight to the outro after the second chorus.

== Music video ==
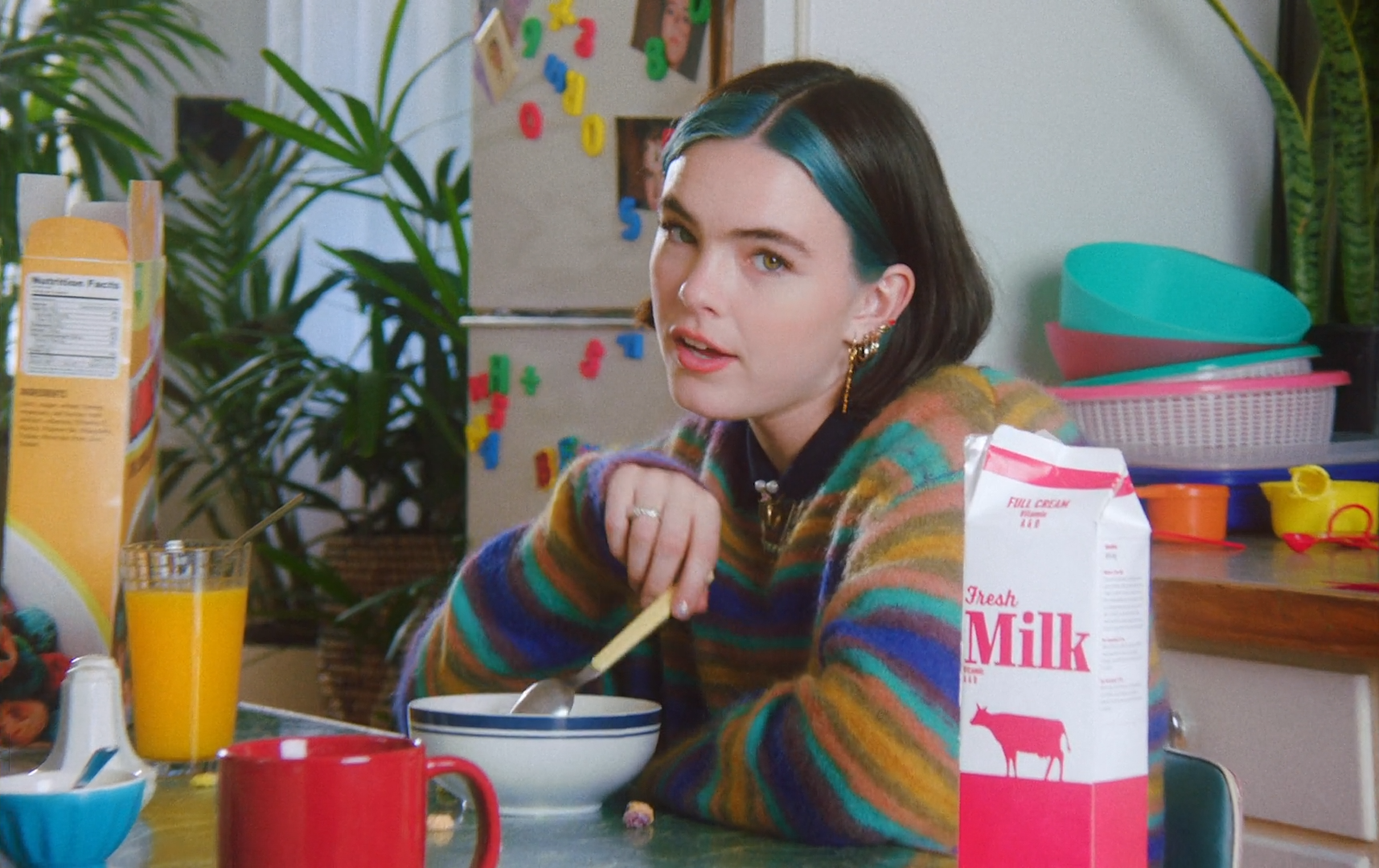
Benee in the Supalonely music video

The song's music video clocked 70 million views in June 2020, four months after its initial release. The song's music video was described as "dreamy" and "colourful" by Billboard. Emily Rose of Ones to Watch dubbed the music video as "a technicolor dream" and wrote that Benee "shows off some killer dance moves while proving that you can still have a great time all on your own." Rose Riddell of Coup de Main simply wrote that the music video features Benee "dancing around a house and chilling in a bathtub" before shouting out the lyric "Now I'm in the bathtub crying." The singer herself said on the video, "It starts with me being a lonely teen at home then turns into this weird dreamscape, where I end up dancing around with Gus."

== Critical reception ==
On his Apple Music show, Elton John described "Supalonely" as a "smash record", and further described Benee as "an amazing young artist" who "writes really brilliantly". Ariana Marsh from i-D wrote that the "sunny pop" song "turns your typical breakup song on its head". The song was described by Glenn Rowley of Billboard as "a quirky, knowing ode to the art of loneliness". Billboard also ranked "Supalonely" at number 17 on their list of "The 100 Best Songs of 2020".

== Commercial performance ==
The song was certified Gold on its second week on the New Zealand Top 40, when it rose to number two, from its debut at number three the week before. It peaked in the top 10 of many other countries including Australia, Canada, Norway, Ireland, the Netherlands and Belgium, as well as in the top 40 of countries such as the UK, the US, France, Germany, Sweden, Austria, Finland and Denmark.

== Charts ==
=== Weekly charts ===
Chart (2020)	Peak position
Argentina (Argentina Hot 100)	19
Australia (ARIA)	6
Austria (Ö3 Austria Top 40)	15
Belgium (Ultratop 50 Flanders)	3
Belgium (Ultratop 50 Wallonia)	4
Canada Hot 100 (Billboard)	10
Canada CHR/Top 40 (Billboard)	12
Canada Hot AC (Billboard)	29
Colombia (National-Report)	100
Croatia (HRT)	3
Czech Republic Airplay (ČNS IFPI)	35
Czech Republic Singles Digital (ČNS IFPI)	19
Denmark (Tracklisten)	17
Finland (Suomen virallinen lista)	18
France (SNEP)	36
Germany (GfK)	26
Germany Airplay (BVMI)	1
Hungary (Stream Top 40)	23
Iceland (Tónlistinn)	6
Ireland (IRMA)	10
Italy (FIMI)	64
Lebanon (Lebanese Top 20)	9
Lithuania (AGATA)	9
Malaysia (RIM)	3
Mexico Airplay (Billboard)	1
Mexico (Monitor Latino)	9
Netherlands (Dutch Top 40)	4
Netherlands (Mega Top 50)	1
Netherlands (Single Top 100)	6
New Zealand (Recorded Music NZ)	2
Norway (VG-lista)	6
Poland Airplay (ZPAV)	42
Portugal (AFP)	34
Russia Airplay (TopHit) Edited	14
Scottish Singles Sales (Official Charts)	43
Singapore (RIAS)	8
Slovakia Singles Digital (ČNS IFPI)	26
Slovenia (SloTop50)	4
Sweden (Sverigetopplistan)	35
Switzerland (Schweizer Hitparade)	25
UK Singles (Official Charts)	18
US Billboard Hot 100	39
US Adult Pop Airplay (Billboard)	30
US Dance Airplay (Billboard)	12
US Pop Airplay (Billboard)	7
US Hot Rock & Alternative Songs (Billboard)	2
US Rolling Stone Top 100	41

=== Year-end charts ===
Chart (2020)	Position
Argentina Airplay (Monitor Latino)	73
Australia (ARIA)	26
Austria (Ö3 Austria Top 40)	33
Belgium (Ultratop Flanders)	19
Belgium (Ultratop Wallonia)	41
Canada (Canadian Hot 100)	54
Denmark (Tracklisten)	92
France (SNEP)	184
Hungary (Stream Top 40)	69
Netherlands (Dutch Top 40)	30
Netherlands (Single Top 100)	39
New Zealand (Recorded Music NZ)	16
Switzerland (Schweizer Hitparade)	62
US Billboard Hot 100	84
US Dance/Mix Show Airplay (Billboard)	38
US Mainstream Top 40 (Billboard)	25
US Hot Rock & Alternative Songs (Billboard)	8

== Certifications ==
Region	Certification	Certified units/sales
Australia (ARIA)	4× Platinum	280,000^{‡}
Austria (IFPI Austria)	Platinum	30,000^{‡}
Belgium (BRMA)	Gold	20,000^{‡}
Brazil (Pro-Música Brasil)	Diamond	160,000^{‡}
Canada (Music Canada)	3× Platinum	240,000^{‡}
Denmark (IFPI Danmark)	Gold	45,000^{‡}
France (SNEP)	Gold	100,000^{‡}
Germany (BVMI)	Gold	200,000^{‡}
Italy (FIMI)	Gold	35,000^{‡}
New Zealand (RMNZ)	4× Platinum	120,000^{‡}
Poland (ZPAV)	Platinum	20,000^{‡}
Portugal (AFP)	Platinum	10,000^{‡}
Sweden (GLF)	Platinum	8,000,000^{†}
United Kingdom (BPI)	Gold	400,000^{‡}
United States (RIAA)	2× Platinum	2,000,000^{‡}
^{‡} Sales+streaming figures based on certification alone.^{†} Streaming-only figures based on certification alone.

== Release history ==
Region	Date	Format	Label	Ref.
Australia	6 December 2019	Contemporary hit radio	Republic	
New Zealand	6 December 2019	Contemporary hit radio	Republic	
Italy	13 March 2020	Contemporary hit radio	Republic	
United States	17 March 2020	Contemporary hit radio	Republic	
Norway	20 March 2020	Contemporary hit radio	Republic	
United Kingdom	27 March 2020	Contemporary hit radio	Republic	
Various	6 December 2024	7"	Republic	

== Acoustic version ==
"Lownely"
- Acoustic version "Lownely" cover artwork

Single by Benee
- Released: 5 May 2020
- Recorded: 25 March 2020
- Studio: Golden Age, Morningside, Auckland
- Genre: Acoustic
- Length: 3:19
- Label: Republic
- Songwriters: Stella Bennett; Joshua Fountain; Jenna Andrews
- Producer: Fountain

Benee singles chronology
"Supalonely" (2020)	"Lownely" (2020)	"Night Garden" (2020)

In May 2020, Benee released an acoustic remix of the song, entitled "Lownely". This "dreamy" version of the song was recorded at Golden Age Studio in Morningside, Auckland on 25 March, a few hours before the national lockdown for the COVID-19 pandemic in New Zealand began.

=== Charts ===
Chart (2020)	Peak position
New Zealand Hot Singles (RMNZ)	24
New Zealand Artist Hot Singles (RMNZ)	1

=== Release history ===
Region	Date	Format	Label	Ref.
Various	6 May 2020	Digital download	Republic	
