= Amnioverse =

Studio album by Lapalux
- Released: 8 November 2019
- Length: 46:20
- Label: Brainfeeder
- Producer: Lapalux

Lapalux chronology
| Ruinism (2017) | Amnioverse (2019) |

Amnioverse is the fourth studio album by British producer and musician Lapalux. It was released on 8 November 2019 under Brainfeeder.

The first single from the album, "Earth", was released on 4 October 2019.

== Critical reception ==
Professional ratings
Aggregate scores
| Source | Rating |
|---|---|
| Metacritic | 82/100 |
Review scores
| Source | Rating |
| AllMusic | 4/5 stars |
| Clash | 7/10 |
| Exclaim! | 8/10 |
| The Line of Best Fit | 8/10 |

At Metacritic, which assigns a weighted average rating, Amnioverse has received an average score of 82 out of 100, based on 4 critics, indicating "universal acclaim".

Paul Simpson of AllMusic gave the album 4 stars out of 5, writing, "The album contains the producer's most complex, detailed arrangements yet, incorporating sounds of the elements and modular synthesizers into pristinely detailed compositions that progress from near stillness to intense, fractured rhythmic sections." Nick Roseblade of Clash gave the album a 7 out of 10, commenting that "Lapalux has a great touch, but a bit of attention on the parts of the project that feel slightly off could bring out all the fantastic in this record."

== Track listing ==
All tracks are written by Stuart Nicholas Howard, except where noted.

| No. | Title | Writer(s) | Length |
|---|---|---|---|
| 1. | "Oblivion" | | 3:17 |
| 2. | "Voltaic Acid" | | 5:44 |
| 3. | "Momentine" | | 6:04 |
| 4. | "Earth" | | 4:58 |
| 5. | "Hellix" | | 4:48 |
| 6. | "Thin Air" | Howard; Jófríður Ákadóttir | 4:46 |
| 7. | "Limb to Limb" | Howard; Lilia Anastasia Grossmith | 4:14 |
| 8. | "The Lux Quadrant" | | 4:47 |
| 9. | "Amnioverse" | | 4:06 |
| 10. | "Esc" | | 3:36 |
| Total length: | | | 46:20 |

== Personnel ==
Credits adapted from liner notes.

- Lapalux – production, mixing
- Louisahhh – vocals (1)
- Mike Lesirge – Rhodes piano (2)
- Lilia – vocals (2, 3, 7, 9)
- JFDR – vocals (6, 8)
- Leticia Trandafir – vocals (9)
- Pawws – vocals (10)
- Daddy Kev – mastering
- Dan Medhurst – creative direction, photography
- Owen Gildersleeve – artwork, set design
- Molly Bryan – set assistance, design assistance
- George Oxby – styling
- Sarah Sayuri Hare – model
