= Episode 001: Chasing Hayley =

EP by Kidz in Space
- Released: 31 August 2009
- Length: 24:02
- Label: Universal Music Group New Zealand

Singles from Episode 001: Chasing Hayley
- 1. "Ocean of Drugs" Released: 6 July 2009; 2. "Downtime" Released: 10 August 2009; 3. "Lose My Cool" Released: 30 November 2009

Episode 001: Chasing Hayley is the debut EP by New Zealand hip-hop band, Kidz in Space. It was released by Universal Music Group New Zealand on 31 August 2009.

== Critical reception ==
Jonny Carson from NZ Musician compared Episode 001: Chasing Hayley to the work of The Black Eyed Peas and LMFAO, and called it "one small step for Kidz In Space, one giant leap for NZ hip hop".

== Track listing ==
1. "Cupids Got a Shotgun" – 4:46
2. "Psychedelic Girl" (featuring Alisa Xayalith) – 3:13
3. "Beauty Queen" – 2:52
4. "Downtime" – 3:28
5. "Lose My Cool" – 3:00
6. "Phone Call" (featuring Coco Solid) – 3:20
7. "Ocean of Drugs" – 3:23
