= Night Garden =

2020 single by Benee featuring Bakar and Kenny Beats

Single by Benee featuring Kenny Beats and Bakar

from the album Hey U X
- Released: 15 July 2020
- Studio: The Cave (Los Angeles)
- Length: 3:41
- Label: Republic
- Songwriters: Abubakar Shariff-Farr; Kenneth Blume II; Stella Rose Bennett

Benee singles chronology
| "Lownely" (2020) | "Night Garden" (2020) | "Snail" (2020) |

"Night Garden" is a song by New Zealand singer Benee featuring American producer Kenny Beats and British musician Bakar, released on 15 July 2020 as the lead single from her debut studio album Hey U X (2020).

== Background and composition ==
"Night Garden" was recorded in the Cave", Kenny Beats' studio in Burbank, California, shortly before the introduction of COVID-19 lockdowns around the world. The song became Benee's first release following the popularization of the song "Supalonely" which initially was initially released as part of her EP Stella & Steve (2019) but later became the third single. The commercial success of "Supalonely" led it to becoming a sleeper hit, with Benee performing the song on both The Tonight Show Starring Jimmy Fallon and The Ellen DeGeneres Show.

== Critical reception ==
In terms of musical genre, Mike Wass of Idolator noted that "Night Garden" "falls somewhere between alt-R&B and alt-pop." Chris DeVille of Stereogum described Kenny Beats' production as "hard-hitting yet surprisingly low-key," while David Renshaw of The Fader described the instrumental as a "low-slung beat" which Benee maintains by "keep[ing] things in a similarly downbeat mood as she sings of things creeping in her dreams". DeVille noted that "despite the music’s relatively laidback vibes, Benee’s lyrics are paranoid. [...] She switches into rich, soulful singing for the chorus." Ruby Scott of Ones to Watch described "Night Garden" as "jaw-dropping from start to finish," while drawing resemblance between Benee's "restrained delivery" and that of both Björk and Billie Eilish. DIY described the song as an "example of Benee’s skill at crafting infectious pop bops". Cameron Adams of Herald Sun described "Night Garden" as "a Wu-Tang-inspired, hip hop influenced single". Happy Australia noted that the song was "a change in scenery from Benee’s usual brand of summery pop".

== Live performances ==
On 19 July 2020, Benee performed "Night Garden" on the premiere of The Sound, a music television program broadcast by the Australian Broadcasting Corporation.

== Charts ==
Chart performance for "Night Garden"
| Chart (2020) | Peak position |
|---|---|
| Belgium (Ultratip Bubbling Under Flanders) | 26 |
| New Zealand Hot Singles (RMNZ) | 4 |
| New Zealand Artist Singles (RMNZ) | 12 |
