= Where Polly People Go to Read =

2019 studio album by Gus Dapperton

Studio album by Gus Dapperton
- Released: April 19, 2019
- Recorded: 2018
- Length: 33:22
- Label: AWAL

Gus Dapperton chronology
You Think You're a Comic! (2018)	Where Polly People Go to Read (2019)	Orca (2020)

Singles from Where Polly People Go to Read
- 1. "World Class Cinema" Released: October 19, 2018; 2. "My Favorite Fish" Released: January 24, 2019; 3. "Fill Me Up Anthem" Released: March 14, 2019; 4. "Coax and Botany" Released: September 9, 2019

Where Polly People Go to Read is the debut studio album by American singer Gus Dapperton, released on April 19, 2019 on AWAL. It was recorded in 2018 and was supported by four singles: "World Class Cinema", "My Favorite Fish", "Fill Me Up Anthem", and "Coax and Botany".

== Singles ==
The first single from the album, "World Class Cinema", was released on October 19, 2018, with a short film music video released the same day. On January 24, 2019, Dapperton officially announced his debut album, and released the second single, "My Favorite Fish". The music video for the song was premiered on YouTube and released on February 6, 2019. The third single, "Fill Me Up Anthem", was released on March 14, 2019. The music video was released on March 28, 2019.

== Tour ==
A tour to support the album kicked off on February 6, 2019, in Lyon, France, and concluded on December 7, 2019, in Perth, Australia.

== Critical reception ==
Professional ratings
Review scores
Source	Rating
AllMusic	3/5 stars
Dork	4/5 stars
Highsnobiety	4/5 stars
The Line of Best Fit	8/10
Pitchfork	6.4/10

Where Polly People Go to Read received mostly positive reviews from critics. Thomas Harvey of The Line of Best Fit gave the album an 8/10 rating, saying in his review, "Performed with an idiosyncratic array of synths and growling vocals, the album is consistent in its sound and a promising continuation of success for Dapperton." Alex Cabré of Dork spoke of the album, stating "Nowadays, hop on social media and lo-fi bedroom pop artists are ten a penny, but it takes real talent, not just quirky haircuts and trendy clothes, to successfully leap over to the ‘actual serious musician’ camp. Dapperton has earned the right to that leap with this, an album that uses novelty as a Trojan horse to sneak a glistening new pop identity into the world."

== Track listing ==
Where Polly People Go to Read track listing
No.	Title	Length
1.	"Verdigris"	3:42
2.	"World Class Cinema"	3:19
3.	"Nomadicon"	3:13
4.	"Eyes for Ellis"	3:20
5.	"Coax and Botany"	2:54
6.	"Sockboy"	4:07
7.	"Roadhead"	3:21
8.	"My Favorite Fish"	3:36
9.	"Fill Me Up Anthem"	4:37
10.	"I Ascend"	1:15
Total length:		33:22
