= Wavy (Muroki song) =

2021 single by Muroki

Single by Muroki

from the album Dawn
- Released: 26 February 2021
- Genre: soul; R&B; reggae
- Length: 3:45
- Label: Olive Records
- Songwriter(s): Muroki Mbote Wa Githinji; Djeisan Suskov
- Producer(s): Djeisan Suskov

Muroki singles chronology
"Light Me Up" (2020)	"Wavy" (2021)	"Crossroads" (2021)

Music video
- "Wavy" on YouTube

"Wavy" is a song by Kenyan-New Zealand reggae musician Muroki, released as a single in February 2021. The song was commercially successful in New Zealand, becoming platinum certified. In September 2021, Muroki released a Māori language version of the song, called "Rehurehu".

== Background and composition ==
The song was inspired by Brazilian samba rhythms; taking the feel of a Brazilian fiesta and blending this with "funk and new school sounds". The song was written together with producer Djeisan Suskov, and is inspired by experiences Muroki had at a music festival, expressing the "crazy visuals and feelings [he] was having there".

== Release and promotion ==
"Wavy" was released as the lead single from Muroki's extended play Dawn in February 2021. He performed the song live for sessions for Radio New Zealand in June 2021,

== Critical reception ==
Manning Patston of Happy Media called the song "infectious", and called the song's opening "the most body-friendly groove I've heard this year". He praised the song as feeling "effortless" despite being carefully arranged, and noted Muroki's talent as a musician.

== Credits and personnel ==
Credits adapted from Tidal.

- Muroki Mbote Wa Githinji – electric 6-string, songwriter, performer
- Djeisan Suskov – engineer, mastering engineer, mixer, producer, songwriter

== Charts ==
Chart (2021)	Peak position
New Zealand (Recorded Music NZ)	26

== Certifications ==
Certifications and sales for "Wavy"
Region	Certification	Certified units/sales
New Zealand (RMNZ)	Platinum	30,000^{‡}
^{‡} Sales+streaming figures based on certification alone.

== Release history ==
Release dates and formats for "Wavy"
Region	Date	Edition	Format(s)	Label(s)	Ref.
Various	26 February 2021	Original	Digital download; streaming	Olive	
Various	3 September 2021	Māori language version	Digital download; streaming	Olive	
