= Lapalux =

English record producer

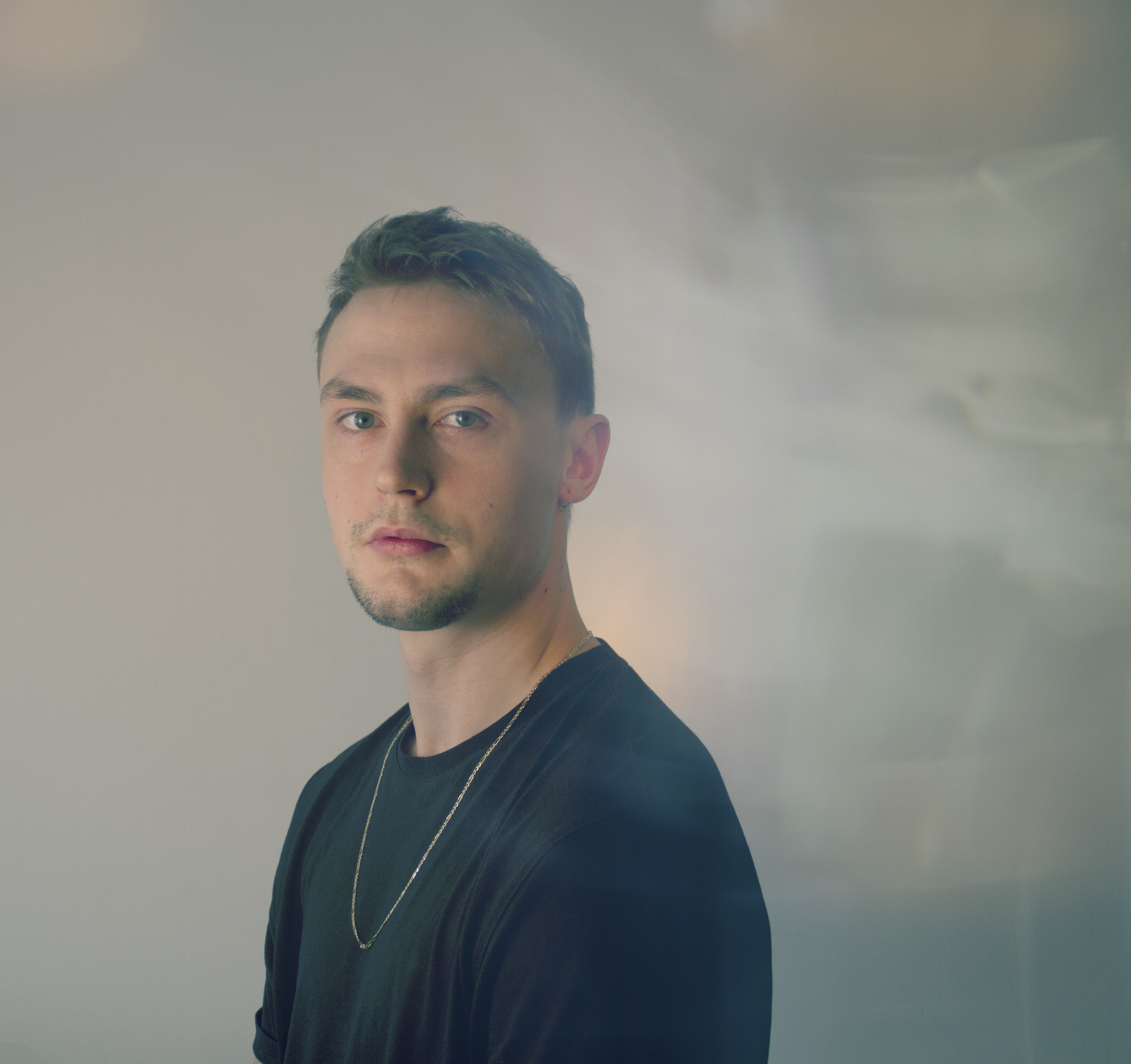
- Lapalux in 2014

Background information
- Born: Stuart Nicholas Howard; Essex, England
- Genres: Glitch; wonky; downtempo
- Occupation: Producer
- Years active: 2008–present
- Labels: Brainfeeder, Pictures Music, Ninja Tune
- Website: www.lapalux.com

Stuart Nicholas Howard, better known by his stage name Lapalux (short for "Lap of Luxury") or LPLX, is an English record producer from Essex. He is known for his experimental use of texture and wonky, off-kilter beats. He has released four LPs to date and has remixed works by Mirrors, The Acid, and Young Thug.

== Career ==
Prior to producing music under the Lapalux moniker, Stuart released music under the name 'Rude Mummy Not Daddy'.

In 2008, Lapalux released the Forest EP. His 2011 EP, Many Faces Out of Focus, was released on Pictures Music. In 2012, he released two EPs, When You're Gone and Some Other Time, on Flying Lotus' Brainfeeder label.

His debut album, Nostalchic, was released on Brainfeeder in 2013. To promote the album, he collaborated with rapper Busdriver for the track, "Forlorn".

In 2014, he released a seven-minute track, entitled "Movement I, II & III", on Brainfeeder. In that year, he created a new song titled "Make Money", which was included in the expanded Grand Theft Auto V soundtrack that was a part of the re-release of the game on PC, Xbox One, and PlayStation 4 systems.

His second studio album, entitled Lustmore, was released in April 2015.

In June 2017, Howard released his third album, Ruinism.

On November 8, 2019, he released his fourth album Amnioverse.

== Discography ==
=== Albums ===
- Nostalchic (2013)
- Lustmore (2015)
- Ruinism (2017)
- Amnioverse (2019)

=== EPs ===
- Forest (2011)
- Many Faces Out of Focus (2011)
- When You're Gone (2012)
- Some Other Time (2012)
- The End of Industry (2017)
- ABOVE_BETWEEN_BELOW (2018)
- Esrevoinma (2020)
- Total Reality, Total Chaos (2021)
- On The Grid (2025)

=== Singles ===
- "Forlorn" (2013)
- "Moveoutofmyway" (2013)
- "Without You (ft. Kerry Leatham)" (2013)
- "Gold" (2013)
- "Guuurl" (2013)
- "Lonesum Tnite" (2014)
- "Movement I, II & III" (2014)
- "Make Money" (2014)
- "Closure (ft. Szjerdene)" (2015)
- "Don't Mean A Thing" (2015)
- "Puzzle (ft. Andreya Triana)" (2015)
- "Rotted Arp (ft. Louisahhh)" (2017)
- "Flickering (ft. JFDR)" (2017)

=== Remixes ===
- Fluker Love - "Soaked (Lapalux Mix)" from Streamer (2010)
- Knxwledge - Highland (Lapalux Remix)
- Mirrors - "Fear of Drowning (Lapalux Remix)" from Deconstructed (2011)
- Bonobo - "Prelude (Lapalux's Finger on the Tape Remix)" from Black Sands Remixed (2012)
- The Acid - Basic Instinct (Lapalux Remix)
- Lianne La Havas - Lost and Found (Lapalux Remix)
- Purple Ferdinand - In My Dreams (Lapalux Remix)
- Andreya Triana - The Best Is Yet To Come (Lapalux Remix)
- Nicolas Godin - Widerstehe Doch Der Sünde (Lapalux Remix)
- Joji - Demons (Lapalux Remix)
