= Nostalchic =

Studio album by Lapalux
- Released: 25 March 2013
- Genre: Electronic
- Length: 46:35
- Label: Brainfeeder
- Producer: Stuart Howard

Lapalux chronology
Nostalchic (2013)	Lustmore (2015)

Singles from Nostalchic
- 1. "Guuurl" Released: 2013; 2. "Without You" Released: 2013

Professional ratings
Aggregate scores
Source	Rating
Metacritic	79/100
Review scores
Source	Rating
BBC	favorable
Beats Per Minute	75/100
Clash	7/10
Exclaim!	7/10
Fact	4/5
MusicOMH	4/5 stars
Pitchfork	7.4/10
PopMatters	7/10 stars
The Skinny	4/5 stars
XLR8R	7.5/10

Nostalchic is the debut studio album by British record producer Lapalux. It was released via Brainfeeder on 25 March 2013. It peaked at number 27 on the UK Dance Albums Chart.

== Critical reception ==
At Metacritic, which assigns a weighted average score out of 100 to reviews from mainstream critics, Nostalchic received an average score of 79% based on 13 reviews, indicating "generally favorable reviews".

Lauren Martin of Fact said: "Whilst Nostalchic is Lapalux's most full-bodied work to date, it's also one of the finer examples of how the recent house-meets-r'n'b explosion can be executed with subtlety and finesse." Jonah Bromwich of Pitchfork gave the album a 7.4 out of 10, saying, "keeping solidly in line with the Brainfeeder tradition, Nostalchic is a forward-looking album, warm and comfortable but never obvious."

Inthemix placed it at number 16 on the "Top 20 Albums of 2013" list.

== Track listing ==
No.	Title	Length
1.	"Iamsys (Tape Intro)"	2:53
2.	"Guuurl"	3:45
3.	"Kelly Brook"	2:58
4.	"One Thing" (featuring Jenna Andrews)	3:55
5.	"Flower"	4:12
6.	"Swallowing Smoke"	4:29
7.	"Without You" (featuring Kerry Leatham)	5:26
8.	"Straight Over My Head"	3:31
9.	"Dance" (featuring Astrid Williamson)	3:37
10.	"The Dead Sea"	4:23
11.	"Walking Words"	2:38
12.	"OEA (Tape Outro)" (featuring Kerry Leatham)	4:48

iTunes edition bonus track
No.	Title	Length
13.	"Operate"	4:32

Japanese edition bonus track
No.	Title	Length
13.	"Fat Gold Chain"	2:46

== Charts ==
Chart	Peak position
UK Dance Albums (OCC)	27
