= Gus Dapperton =

American singer-songwriter (born 1997)

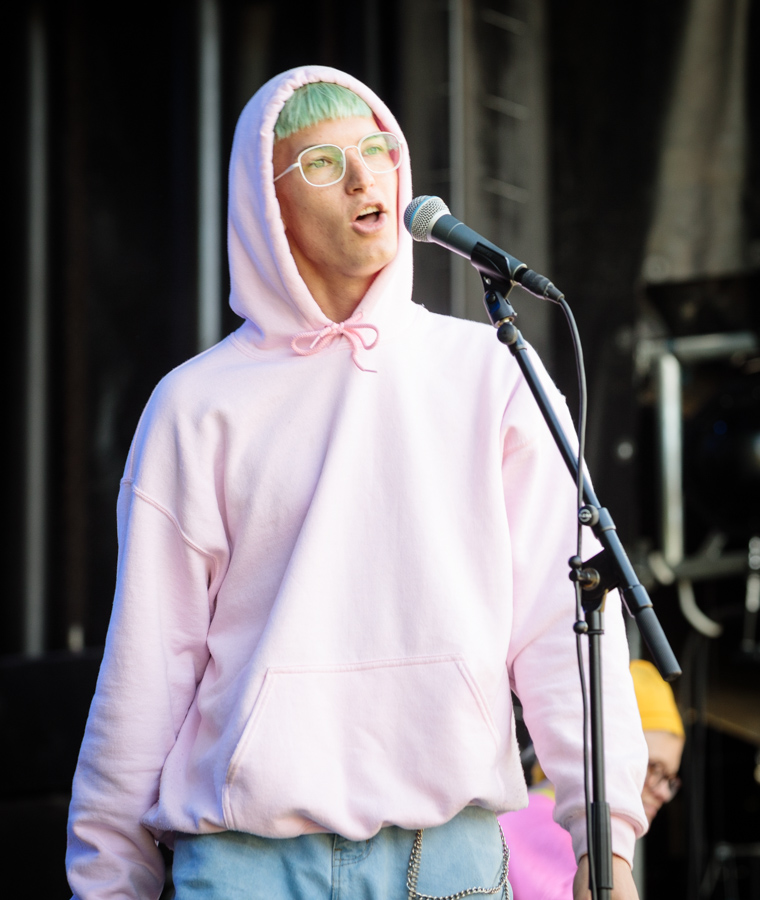
- Gus Dapperton in Norway in 2018

Background information
- Born: Brendan Patrick Rice; March 11, 1997 (age 29); Warwick, New York, U.S.
- Genres: Indie pop; bedroom pop; synth-pop
- Occupations: Singer; songwriter; musician; model
- Instruments: Guitar, vocals, keyboard
- Years active: 2015–present
- Labels: AWAL; Warner
- Website: gusdapperton.com

Brendan Patrick Rice (born March 11, 1997), better known by his stage name Gus Dapperton, is an American singer and songwriter from Warwick, New York.

== Public image ==
Dapperton has received particular attention for his fashion style, consisting at some points of a green bowl cut, noticeable jewelry, eyeliner, brightly colored clothing, and thick-rimmed glasses. Despite being known for his gender-bending fashion, Dapperton does not believe in "gendered clothing" and says he simply wears what he likes, avoiding concern about gender stereotypes. He also mentions that he sees his appearance and fashion as part of his creative expression and "a form of art on their own".

In 2022, he signed with IMG Models and was the face of Celine Homme spring/summer campaign.

Dapperton has mentioned that he prefers to go by his stage name rather than his birth name, explaining it as "I sort of referenced those two eras of my life. The start of a new era being me, Gus, this is my music, this is how I’m gonna express myself for the rest of my life, and Brendan being someone who is more neglected and discouraged from that." He also described "Brendan" as someone scared to embrace their own individuality, while "Gus" is closer to his true self.

== Career ==
=== 2016–2017: "Moodna, Once With Grace" and Yellow and Such ===
Gus Dapperton released his debut single, "Moodna, Once With Grace", in 2016. In 2017, Dapperton released his debut EP, Yellow and Such.

=== 2018: You Think You're A Comic! ===
In 2018, Dapperton released his second EP, You Think You're A Comic!.

In support of the EP, he embarked on both an American and European tour, occasionally joined by his younger sister on the keyboard.

Dapperton's song "Of Lacking Spectacle" was featured on the Netflix series 13 Reasons Why and appears on the soundtrack album.

=== 2019: Where Polly People Go to Read ===
In 2019, Dapperton released his debut album, Where Polly People Go to Read, described as chronicling the highs and lows of falling in love. On February 9, 2019, he released a self-directed music video for song "My Favorite Fish", shot at his parents house in New Jersey.

The 10-track album received positive reviews from critics. In September 2019, he released EP In Passing 001, a 4-track collaboration with Hayes Bradley, who at the time was using the artist name B.Hayes.

Also in 2019, Dapperton featured on the track "Supalonely" by artist Benee. The song gained immense popularity on the online video-sharing platform TikTok in March 2020, gaining more than 6.9 billion plays for the month. The widespread success of the single led to Dapperton performing the song with BENEE on The Tonight Show Starring Jimmy Fallon.

=== 2020–2022: Orca ===
Dapperton's second studio album, Orca, was released on September 18, 2020. He released four singles, "First Aid", "Post Humorous", "Medicine", and "Bluebird", prior to the album's release. This album features only one artist other than Dapperton, Filipino Australian artist Chela on the track "My Say So", during the bridge and background vocals. Dapperton commented on a shift in his songwriting, saying "In the past, I've written my songs from a place of love and heartbreak. This album is about internal pain and suffering". He also mentioned themes of healing and redemption as key elements to the album. He also elaborated on the album title, Orca, as a metaphor for pain and suffering stemming from their lives in captivity.

Dapperton released a music video for lead single "First Aid" on October 21, 2020. The video was directed by Dapperton and features his younger sister Ruby Amadelle, who also sings on the track.

On April 7, 2021, Dapperton released a remix version of "Palms" as the album fifth single, featuring American rapper Channel Tres. The remix was included on the deluxe version of the album which was released on June 11, 2021. The deluxe version also includes three new songs: "Sober Up", "Flatline" and "Steady", in which the former was released as the sixth single of Orca era.

Throughout 2020-2022, Dapperton was featured on a series of collaborative singles with other artists, including Surf Mesa's "Somewhere", Anna of the North's "Meteorite", Spill Tab's "Velcro" and Easy Life's "Antifreeze. He also featured on the track "Pumped up Kicks" on the 10th anniversary deluxe edition of Foster The People's album Torches.

In August 2022, Dapperton signed with Warner Records, releasing a cover of Fleetwood Mac's "Landslide" in conjunction with the news. On the signing, Warner Records released a statement "We are thrilled to have Gus as the newest member of the Warner/LMK Family. He is a singular talent who has laid an incredible artistic foundation on his own terms. Extremely excited to start building his next chapter together."

=== 2023: Henge ===
In 2023, Dapperton returned with new singles "Wet Cement" and "Horizons", the latter of which was accompanied by a self-directed music video. With "Horizons", Dapperton teased a new album, stating that the music video highlighted "a whole new world for my next project".

On April 21, 2023, Dapperton released single "Don't Let Me Down" with long time collaborator BENEE. The single was accompanied with the announcement of Dapperton's third and major label debut album, titled Henge and scheduled for release on July 7, 2023. The title is in reference to Manhattanhenge, a phenomenon in which the sun aligns with the streets of New York City, creating a glow of light. Dapperton describes it as "a love letter to my New York City," a formative location for his early songwriting. With beginning and ending tracks "Sunset" and "Sunrise", Dapperton described the album as "more of a concept album" about love and fear in contrast to his previous work, which was "more casual and honest" about depression and healing. Similarly, he described Henge as production-heavy, while Orca featured live instrumentation and the songwriting. On June 9, 2023, Dapperton released the lead single "Sunset".

== Artistry ==
Dapperton often works by himself, not enlisting help from producers or collaborators. He explained his beginnings as an artist started in computer production on GarageBand before he began creating his own vocals and instrumentation, and also stated that he simply prefers to mix and master alone due to the desire to materialize his ideas very quickly. He also frequently answered that he had no dream collaborator, finding it difficult to imagine working with someone he has never met based only on their public image. However, for his second album Orca, Dapperton enlisted the help of other musicians, which he said added depth and vulnerability to the music as well as growth and positivity to his creative process.

Despite his collaboration on "Supalonely" achieving viral success, Dapperton has criticized the idea of "TikTok music" and labeling of artists as "bedroom pop," believing that they are reductive and do not facilitate well rounded artists or listeners. When asked to label his own music as a genre, Dapperton chose "surrealism". Dapperton admits his music would also fall into the "indie" or "alternative" genres, but dislikes "how all those terms have kind of curated a very specific theme or image when you hear those words". Dapperton also admires mainstream pop music and "never denied the pleasures of pop music growing up". He lists Odd Future, King Krule, David Bowie, MF Doom, The Beatles, and Britney Spears as his early influences, and says Taylor Swift's "Love Story" is one of his favorite songs.

Dapperton directs many of his music videos himself in collaboration with his friend Matthew Dillon Cohen, calling himself "a director as much as a musician". He has said he is very inspired by cinema, is very into film, and has an interest in creating scores in the future. He names the soundtrack to Palo Alto as one of his favorites and says that his song "Medicine" while imagining a movie and as if it were part of a movie soundtrack. He also states that he cares a lot about his work and sees visuals as very important in his conception of new music, and that he likes to put 110% into his work, including full visuals.

== Personal life ==
Following his 2018 tour, Dapperton lived with his parents in Long Branch, New Jersey before moving to New York City.

Dapperton first became interested in music production while in eighth grade when he won a song contest after using GarageBand in his school's new computer lab. He played lacrosse and was a member of the diving team while in high school. He was inspired to pursue music seriously while recovering from an ACL tear and subsequent surgery.

Dapperton attended Drexel University studying music technology, but took a semester off to go on tour in support of his 2018 EP You Think You're a Comic!. After two years at Drexel he chose not to return, citing a competitive environment in the music department as one contributing factor.

He previously dated actress Barbie Ferreira, who appears in his music video for the song "Prune, You Talk Funny".

== Discography ==
=== Studio albums ===
List of studio albums, with release date and label shown
Title	Details
Where Polly People Go to Read	Released: April 19, 2019; Label: AWAL; Formats: Digital download, streaming
Orca	Released: September 18, 2020; Label: AWAL; Formats: Digital download, streaming
Henge	Released: July 7, 2023; Label: Warner; Formats: Digital download, streaming
4 Dear Life	Released: October 23, 2026; Label: Formats: Digital download, streaming, CD, vinyl

=== Extended plays ===
List of EPs, with release date and label shown
Title	Details
Yellow and Such	Released: August 3, 2017; Label: Self-released; Formats: Digital download, streaming
You Think You're a Comic!	Released: February 9, 2018; Label: Self-released; Formats: Digital download, streaming
Tunes For Late Spring	Released: June 7, 2024; Label: Self-released; Formats: Digital download, streaming

=== Singles ===
==== As lead artist ====
List of singles as lead artist, with year released and album shown
Title	Year	Album
"Moodna, Once with Grace"	2016	Non-album singles
"Ditch"	2016	Non-album singles
"I'm Just Snacking"	2017	Yellow and Such
"Prune, You Talk Funny"	2017	You Think You're a Comic!
"World Class Cinema"	2018	Where Polly People Go to Read
"My Favorite Fish"	2019	Where Polly People Go to Read
"Fill Me Up Anthem"	2019	Where Polly People Go to Read
"Coax & Botany"	2019	Where Polly People Go to Read
"Give it to Me Straight"	2019	Non-album single
"First Aid"	2020	Orca
"Post Humorous"	2020	Orca
"Medicine"	2020	Orca
"Bluebird"	2020	Orca
"Palms" (solo or with Channel Tres)	2021	Orca and Orca (Deluxe)
"Sober Up"	2021	Orca (Deluxe)
"Meteorite" (with Anna of the North)	2022	Crazy Life
"Wet Cement"	2022	Henge
"Horizons"	2023	Henge
"Don't Let Me Down" (with BENEE)	2023	Henge
"Sunset"	2023	Henge
"Homebody"	2023	Henge
"Fallout" (with Lyrical Lemonade featuring Lil Yachty and Joey Badass)	2024	All Is Yellow
"Lil Tune" (with Electric Guest)	2024	Tunes for Late Spring
"What You Won't Do For Love"	2024	Tunes for Late Spring
"Believe"	2024	Tunes for Late Spring

==== As featured artist ====
List of singles as featured artist, with year released and album shown
Title	Year	Peak chart positions									Certifications	Album
Title	Year	US	AUS	BEL (FL)	CAN	IRE	NLD	NOR	NZ	UK	Certifications	Album
"Faceless" (Beshken featuring Gus Dapperton)	2016	—	—	—	—	—	—	—	—	—		Closed Doors (EP)
"Supalonely" (Benee featuring Gus Dapperton)	2019	39	6	3	10	11	9	6	2	18	RIAA: 2× Platinum; ARIA: 4× Platinum; BEA: Gold; BPI: Silver; MC: Platinum; RMNZ: 4× Platinum	Stella & Steve and Hey U X
"Somewhere" (Surf Mesa featuring Gus Dapperton)	2020	—	—	—	—	—	—	—	—	—		Non-album single
"Antifreeze" (Easy Life featuring Gus Dapperton)	2022	—	—	—	—	—	—	—	—	—		Maybe in Another Life...
"Thank You For Leaving Me" (Sports featuring Gus Dapperton)	2024	—	—	—	—	—	—	—	—	—		Non-album single
"—" denotes a recording that did not chart or was not released.

=== Guest appearances ===
List of guest appearances, with other artist, with year released and album shown
Title	Year	Other artist	Album
"Of Lacking Spectacle"	2018	—N/a	13 Reasons Why: Season 2 (Music from the Original TV Series)
"Pumped Up Kicks"	2021	Foster the People	Torches X (Deluxe Edition)
"Velcro"	2021	spill tab	Bonnie
"Beautiful Nothing"	2022	Cruel Santino	Subaru Boys: FINAL HEAVEN
"Wicked City"	2022	Cruel Santino	Subaru Boys: FINAL HEAVEN
