= Cool Rainbows =

New Zealand pop band

- Origin: Auckland, New Zealand
- Genres: psychedelic music, indie pop
- Years active: 2009–?
- Label: Lil' Chief Records
- Past members: Djeisan Suskov; Alex Freer; Cass Mitchell; Emily Suskov
- Website: Official Facebook

Cool Rainbows was a psychedelic indie pop band based in Auckland, New Zealand. According to a review, "Cool Rainbows make psychedelic indie pop music that is backed by swirling orchestration and layered dreamscapes of sound." They released their debut album, Whale Rocket, in 2012 on Lil' Chief Records.

== History ==
=== Founding ===
Cool Rainbows was founded as a musical collective and solo project of Djeisan (pronounced "Jason") Suskov, a New Zealand musician. Other members of the collective include Paul Roper, Alex Freer, Cass Mitchell, Jonathan Pearce and Suskov's wife Emily Suskov.

Before founding the band, Suskov had been involved in music from a young age; his father founded Revolver Studios when Suskov was nine, and by the age of thirteen he was helping around the studio. Djeisan later maintained close ties with various studios as a producer,. Suskov went on to serve as frontman for the 2000 post punk band Nova Echo, which later evolved into Cut Off Your Hands. He also played with the art rock band Robot Tigers and the indie rock band Trees Climbing Trees. Since 2015, Suskov has been a member of Leisure.

=== 2012 debut album ===
Around 2009 Suskov began writing the songs for the band's 2012 debut album. As influences for the album, he quoted the Chills, the Clean and David Kilgour's solo material, The Bats, Tall Dwarves and Chris Knox. He also referenced "a lot of 60s 70s rock 'n roll stuff like The Beatles, John Cale, Byrds, Neil Young...stuff that sounds real or honest to me and I can hear the heart of it."

He used both production gear at Revolver Studios and his own laptop for initial recordings, and the album was then produced by Jonathan Bree of Lil' Chief Records in Auckland. Suskov included a large number of friends in the process, with Alex Freer, Cass Mitchell, Paul Roper, Jonathan Pearce and his wife Emily Suskov as core performers. Other musicians on the album include Hayden East, Rikki Sutton, Micheal Ramirez, and Paul McIver.

The album Whale Rocket was released on Lil' Chief Records in 2012, with a video for the track "Reality and a Clue" released that July. In June 2012, the band featured seven live musicians at a time on stage.

== Members ==
Permanent

- Djeisan Suskov – singer-songwriter, vocals
- Emily Suskov

Rotating

- [Various]

== Discography ==
=== Albums ===
- 2012: Whale Rocket (Lil' Chief Records)

=== Singles ===
- 2012: "Southern Summer Fun" (Lil' Chief Records)
- 2012: "Lights" (Lil' Chief Records)
