= Kidz in Space =

New Zealand pop music and hip-hop band

- Origin: Auckland, New Zealand
- Genres: Hip house, alternative hip hop
- Labels: Move The Crowd Records; Warner Music Group
- Members: Josh Fountain; Ashley Hughes; Mat Neshat

Kidz in Space is a New Zealand pop and hip-hop group, consisting of Josh Fountain, Ashley Hughes and Mat "Neesh" Neshat. Their costumed media appearances have been likened to those of band, Split Enz.

== Formation ==
Band members Ashley Hughes and Mat "Neesh" Neshat knew each other for ten years prior to forming the band, before meeting Josh Fountain. They describe N.E.R.D as one of their main musical influences.

== Discography ==
=== Extended plays ===
Year	Title
2009	Episode 001: Chasing Hayley: Released: 31 August; Label: Universal Music Group New Zealand

=== Singles ===
Year	Title	NZ chart peak	Certifications	Album
2009	"Ocean of Drugs"	—		Episode 001: Chasing Hayley
2009	"Lose My Cool"	—		Episode 001: Chasing Hayley
2009	"Downtime"	20	NZ:Gold	Episode 001: Chasing Hayley
2010	"Ghost" (featuring Dan Black)	—		Ghost
2011	"On the Road"	—		Ghost
