= Benee discography =

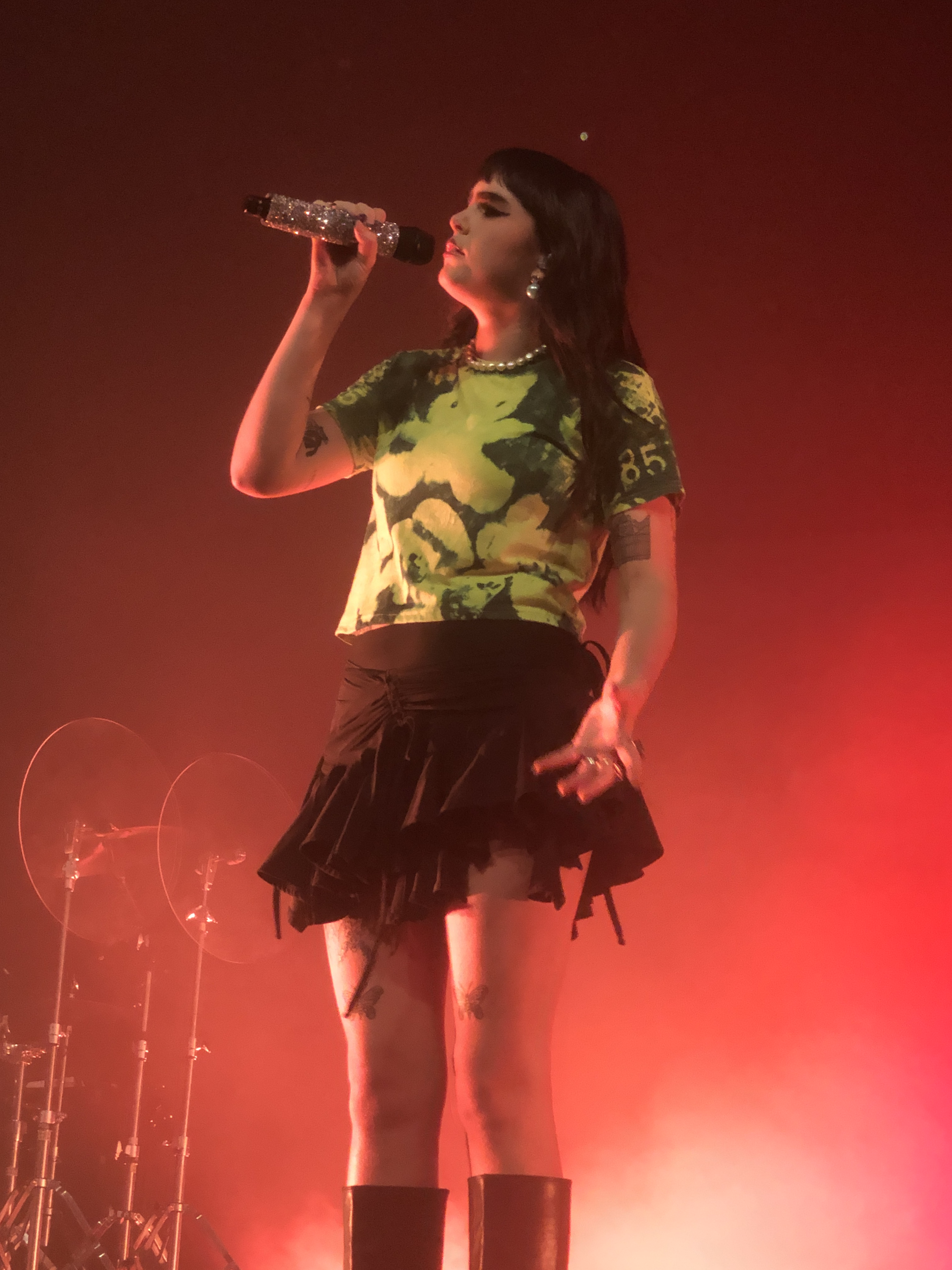
- Benee performing in Sydney in 2022
- Studio albums: 2
- EPs: 3
- Singles: 47
- Promotional singles: 1

New Zealand singer and songwriter Benee has released two studio album, three extended plays (EPs), forty-seven singles, and one promotional singles.

Benee has received numerous awards throughout the past few years. Including her nomination for Breakthrough Artist of the Year by Aotearoa Music Awards.

== Studio albums ==
Title	Details	Peak chart positions		Certifications
Title	Details	NZ	AUS	Certifications
Hey U X	Released: 13 November 2020; Label: Republic; Formats: CD, Digital download, streaming	2	22	RMNZ: Gold
Ur an Angel I'm Just Particles	Released: 7 November 2025; Label: Republic; Formats: CD, digital download, streaming	24	95	

== Extended plays ==
Title	Details	Peak chart positions							Certifications
Title	Details	NZ	AUS	CAN	FRA	US	US Alt.	US Heat.	Certifications
Fire on Marzz	Released: 28 June 2019; Label: Republic; Formats: Digital download, streaming	13	75	—	—	—	—	—	RMNZ: 2x Platinum
Stella & Steve	Released: 15 November 2019; Label: Republic; Formats: Digital download, streaming	19	—	91	150	138	5	1	RMNZ: Gold
Lychee	Released: 4 March 2022; Label: Republic; Formats: Digital download, streaming	13	—	—	—	—	—	—	
"—" denotes releases that did not chart.

== Compilation albums ==
Title	Details	Peak chart positions
Title	Details	AUS
Fire on Marzz / Stella & Steve	Released: 14 February 2020; Label: Republic; Formats: LP	19 (Note: A physical release combined both EPs, as did ARIA's chart listing.)

== Singles ==
=== As lead artist ===
List of singles as lead artist, with selected chart positions and certifications shown
Title	Year	Peak chart positions										Certifications	Album
Title	Year	NZ	NZ Artist	AUS	BEL (FL)	CAN	IRE	NLD	NOR	UK	US	Certifications	Album
"Tough Guy"	2017	—	— (Note: "Tough Guy" did not enter the NZ Artists Top 40 Singles Chart, but peaked at number 1 on the NZ Artists Heatseeker Singles Chart.)	—	—	—	—	—	—	—	—		Non-album single
"Soaked"	2018	14	1	—	—	—	—	—	—	—	—	RMNZ: 4× Platinum; ARIA: 2× Platinum	Fire on Marzz
"Evil Spider"	2019	— (Note: "Evil Spider" did not enter the NZ Top 40 Singles Chart, but peaked at number 4 on the NZ Hot Singles Chart.)	3	—	—	—	—	—	—	—	—	RMNZ: Platinum; ARIA: Platinum	Fire on Marzz
"Want Me Back"	2019	— (Note: "Want Me Back" did not enter the NZ Top 40 Singles Chart, but peaked at number 16 on the NZ Hot Singles Chart.)	12	—	—	—	—	—	—	—	—	RMNZ: Gold; ARIA: Gold	Fire on Marzz
"Glitter"	2019	3	2	20	—	—	—	—	—	—	— (Note: "Glitter" did not enter the Billboard Hot 100, but peaked at number 40 on the US Hot Rock & Alternative Songs chart.)	RMNZ: 5× Platinum; ARIA: 4× Platinum	Fire on Marzz
"Find an Island"	2019	— (Note: "Find an Island" did not enter the NZ Top 40 Singles Chart, but peaked at number 4 on the NZ Hot Singles Chart.)	5	83	—	—	—	—	—	—	—	RMNZ: Platinum; ARIA: Platinum	Stella & Steve
"Monsta"	2019	— (Note: "Monsta" did not enter the NZ Top 40 Singles Chart, but peaked at number 10 on the NZ Hot Singles Chart.)	18	—	—	—	—	—	—	—	—		Stella & Steve
"Supalonely" (featuring Gus Dapperton)	2019	2	1	6	3	10	11	9	6	18	39	RMNZ: 4× Platinum; ARIA: 4× Platinum; BEA: Gold; BPI: Gold; MC : 3× Platinum; RIAA: 2× Platinum	Stella & Steve and Hey U X
"Lownely"	2020	— (Note: "Lownely" did not enter the NZ Top 40 Singles chart, but peaked at number 24 on the NZ Hot Singles chart.)	— (Note: "Lownely" did not enter the NZ Artists Top 20 Singles chart, but peaked at number 1 on the NZ Artists Hot Singles chart.)	—	—	—	—	—	—	—	—		Non-album single
"Night Garden" (featuring Kenny Beats and Bakar)	2020	— (Note: "Night Garden" did not enter the NZ Top 40 Singles Chart, but peaked at number 4 on the NZ Hot Singles Chart.)	12	—	— (Note: "Night Garden" did not enter the Ultratop Top 50 Singles chart, but peaked at number 26 on the Ultratip Top 50 chart.)	—	—	—	—	—	—		Hey U X
"Snail"	2020	— (Note: "Snail" did not enter the NZ Top 40 Singles chart, but peaked at number 6 on the NZ Hot Singles chart.)	18	—	—	—	—	—	—	—	—		Hey U X
"Plain" (featuring Lily Allen and Flo Milli)	2020	— (Note: "Plain" did not enter the NZ Top 40 Singles Chart, but peaked at number 13 on the NZ Hot Singles Chart.)	17	—	—	—	—	—	—	—	—		Hey U X
"Kool"	2020	— (Note: "Kool" did not enter the NZ Top 40 Singles Chart, but peaked at number 4 on the NZ Hot Singles Chart.)	18	—	—	—	—	—	—	—	—		Hey U X
"Happen to Me"	2021	— (Note: "Happen to Me" did not enter the NZ Top 40 Singles Chart, but peaked at number 7 on the NZ Hot Singles Chart.)	20	—	—	—	—	—	—	—	—		Hey U X
"Doesn't Matter"	2021	— (Note: "Doesn't Matter" did not enter the NZ Top 40 Singles Chart, but peaked at number 8 on the NZ Hot Singles Chart.)	20	—	—	—	—	—	—	—	—		Lychee
"Beach Boy"	2022	— (Note: "Beach Boy" did not enter the NZ Top 40 Singles Chart, but peaked at number 7 on the NZ Hot Singles Chart.)	20	—	—	—	—	—	—	—	—		Lychee
"Never Ending"	2022	— (Note: "Never Ending" did not enter the NZ Top 40 Singles Chart, but peaked at number 17 on the NZ Hot Singles Chart.)	—	—	—	—	—	—	—	—	—		Lychee
"Sunday926" (with Heavy Chest)	2022	—	—	—	—	—	—	—	—	—	—		Non-album singles
"Light" (with Finn Falcon)	2022	— (Note: "Light" did not enter the NZ Top 40 Singles Chart, but peaked at number 35 on the NZ Hot Singles Chart.)	—	—	—	—	—	—	—	—	—		Non-album singles
"Green Honda"	2023	— (Note: "Green Honda" did not enter the NZ Top 40 Singles Chart, but peaked at number eight on the NZ Hot Singles Chart.)	14	—	—	—	—	—	—	—	—		Non-album singles
"Don't Let Me Down" (with Gus Dapperton)	2023	—	—	—	—	—	—	—	—	—	—		Henge
"Bagels"	2023	— (Note: "Bagels" did not enter the NZ Top 40 Singles Chart, but peaked at number 11 on the NZ Hot Singles Chart.)	5	—	—	—	—	—	—	—	—		Non-album single
"Do It Again" (with Mallrat)	2023	— (Note: "Do It Again" did not enter the NZ Top 40 Singles Chart, but peaked at number 30 on the NZ Hot Singles Chart.)	—	—	—	—	—	—	—	—	—		2023 FIFA Women's World Cup
"Love Cocoon" (with Muroki)	2023	— (Note: "Love Cocoon" did not enter the NZ Top 40 Singles Chart, but peaked at number 30 on the NZ Hot Singles Chart.)	—	—	—	—	—	—	—	—	—		Timezones
"Sad Boiii"	2024	— (Note: "Sad Boiii" did not enter the NZ Top 40 Singles Chart, but peaked at number 25 on the NZ Hot Singles Chart.)	—	—	—	—	—	—	—	—	—		Ur an Angel I'm Just Particles
"Animal"	2024	— (Note: "Animal" did not enter the NZ Top 40 Singles Chart, but peaked at number 6 on the Hot 20 Aotearoa Singles Chart.)	—	—	—	—	—	—	—	—	—		Ur an Angel I'm Just Particles
"Off the Rails"	2025	— (Note: "Off the Rails" did not enter the NZ Top 40 Singles Chart, but peaked at number 30 on the NZ Hot Singles Chart. and number 3 on the Hot 20 Aotearoa Singles Chart.)	—	—	—	—	—	—	—	—	—		Ur an Angel I'm Just Particles
"Cinnamon"	2025	— (Note: "Cinnamon" did not enter the NZ Top 40 Singles Chart, but peaked at number 14 on the NZ Hot Singles Chart.)	—	—	—	—	—	—	—	—	—		Ur an Angel I'm Just Particles
"Underwater"	2025	— (Note: "Underwater" did not enter the NZ Top 40 Singles Chart, but peaked at number 25 on the NZ Hot Singles Chart.)	—	—	—	—	—	—	—	—	—		Ur an Angel I'm Just Particles
"—" denotes releases that did not chart, or charted on a subchart.

=== As featured artist ===
Title	Year	Peak chart positions	Album
Title	Year	NZ Hot	Album
"Help Herself" (bbno$ with Diamond Pistols and Benee)	2021	—	My Oh My
"Are You Letting Go?" (Dreamer Boy featuring Benee)	2021	34	Non-album single
"Uh Oh!" (Sub Urban featuring Benee)	2022	37	Hive
"OTT" (easy life featuring Benee)	2022	—	Maybe in Another Life
"I'm So Happy" (Jeremy Zucker featuring Benee)	2022	27	Non-album single
"Fun Out of It" (Johnny Orlando featuring Benee)	2022	—	All the Things That Could Go Wrong
"Lots of Nothing" (Spacey Jane featuring Benee)	2023	34	Here Comes Everybody (Deluxe)

=== Promotional singles ===
List of promotional singles
Title	Year	Peak chart positions	Album
Title	Year	NZ Hot	Album
"Somebody That I Used to Know" (Amazon Original)	2021	40	Non-album single

== Other charted songs ==
List of songs, showing year released and album name
Title	Year	Peak chart positions				Certifications	Album
Title	Year	NZ Hot	NZ Artist	UK Indie Breakers	US Rock & Alt.	Certifications	Album
"Afterlife"	2019	26	—	—	—		Fire on Marzz
"Wishful Thinking"	2019	27	—	—	—	RMNZ: Gold; ARIA: Gold	Fire on Marzz
"Kua Kore He Kupu / Soaked"	2019	8	5	—	—	RMNZ: Gold	Waiata / Anthems
"Blu"	2019	31	—	—	—		Stella & Steve
"Drifting" (featuring Jack Berry)	2019	32	—	—	—		Stella & Steve
"Afterthought" (with Joji)	2020	3	11	10	28	RMNZ: Gold	Nectar
"Same Effect"	2020	8	—	—	—		Hey U X
"Sheesh" (featuring Grimes)	2020	12	—	—	—		Hey U X
"Winter" (featuring Mallrat)	2020	18	—	—	—		Hey U X
"Back to Black"	2020	29	—	—	—		InVersions – Deezer Originals
"Soft Side"	2022	29	—	—	—		Lychee
"Marry Myself"	2022	24	—	—	—		Lychee
"Princess"	2025	25	—	—	—		Ur an Angel I'm Just Particles
"—" denotes releases that did not chart.

== Guest appearances ==
Title	Year	Other artists	Album
"Notice Me"	2019	Role Model	Oh, How Perfect
"Zero to Hero"	2025	A Minecraft Movie	
