= New Zealand top 50 albums of 2019 =

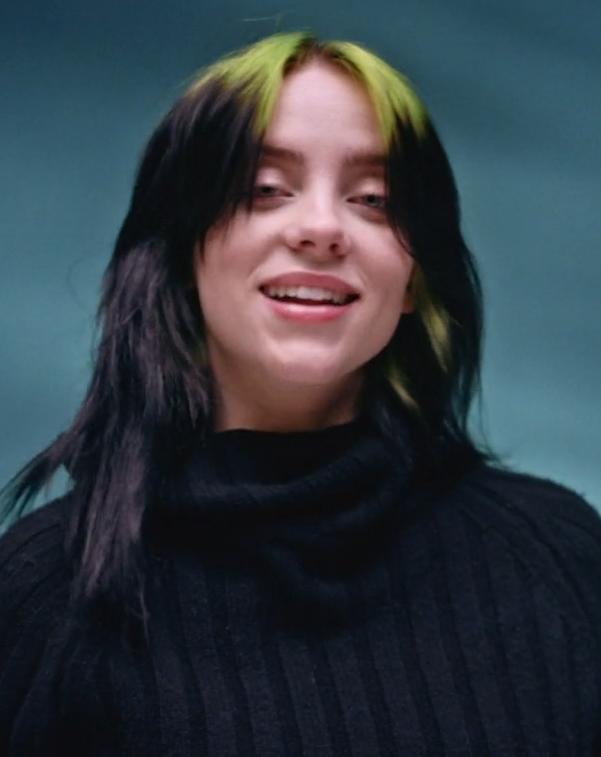
American singer Billie Eilish released the top album of 2019, When We All Fall Asleep, Where Do We Go?

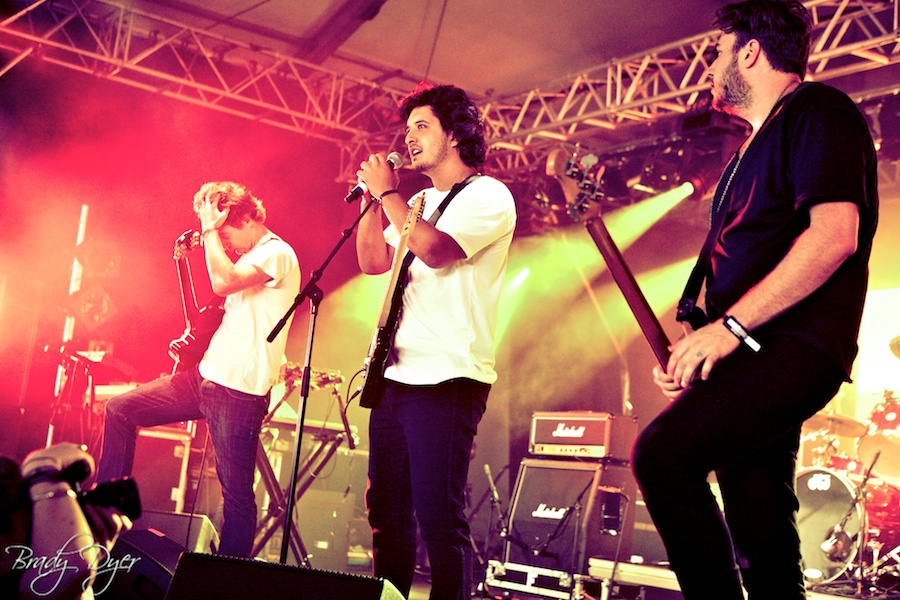
New Zealand band Six60 released the top performing album of 2019 by a New Zealand artist, as well as four of the top 50 albums of 2019

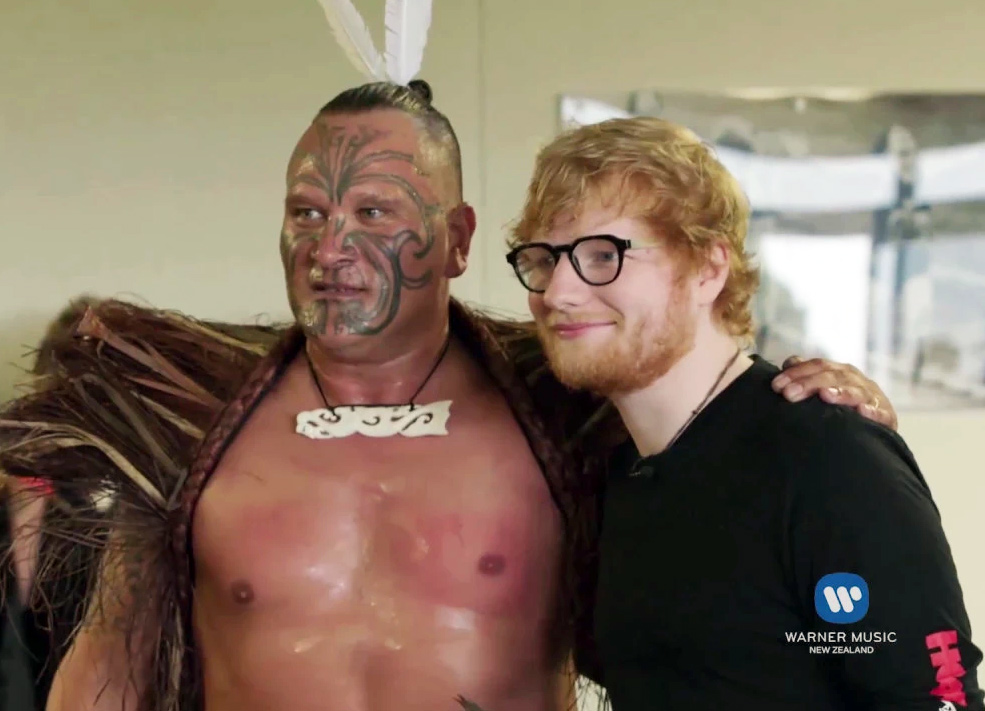
British singer Ed Sheeran's No.6 Collaborations Project was the second highest performing album of the year

This is a list of the top-selling albums in New Zealand for 2019 from the Official New Zealand Music Chart's end-of-year chart, compiled by Recorded Music NZ. Recorded Music NZ also published a list for the top 20 albums released by New Zealand artists.

== Chart ==
Key
† – Album of New Zealand origin (Note: Whether or not a song is of New Zealand origin is determined by the RIANZ.)

Rank	Artist	Title
1	Billie Eilish	When We All Fall Asleep, Where Do We Go?
2	Ed Sheeran	No.6 Collaborations Project
3	Ariana Grande	Thank U, Next
4	Queen	Bohemian Rhapsody: The Original Soundtrack
5	Ed Sheeran	÷
6	Six60	Six60 EP
7	Lady Gaga and Bradley Cooper	A Star Is Born
8	Khalid	Free Spirit
9	Elton John	Diamonds
10	Six60	Six60 (3)
11	Post Malone	Beerbongs & Bentleys
12	Post Malone	Hollywood's Bleeding
13	Billie Eilish	Don't Smile at Me
14	Six60	Six60 (2)
15	Taylor Swift	Lover
16	Pink	Hurts 2B Human
17	Various Artists	Offering
18	Six60	Six60 (1)
19	Drake	Scorpion
20	Eminem	Kamikaze
21	Post Malone	Stoney
22	Travis Scott	Astroworld
23	XXXTentacion	?
24	Various Artists	The Greatest Showman: Original Motion Picture Soundtrack
25	Various Artists	Waiata / Anthems
26	Ed Sheeran	x
27	Fleetwood Mac	Rumours
28	Cardi B	Invasion of Privacy
29	Ella Mai	Ella Mai
30	Eagles	Complete Greatest Hits
31	XXXTentacion	17
32	Lewis Capaldi	Divinely Uninspired to a Hellish Extent
33	Chris Brown	Indigo: Extended
34	Michael Bublé	Christmas: Deluxe Special Edition
35	BTS	Map of the Soul: Persona
36	George Ezra	Staying at Tamara's
37	Robbie Williams	The Christmas Present
38	Bob Marley and the Wailers	Legend: The Best Of 35th Anniversary Edition
39	Shawn Mendes	Shawn Mendes
40	Mitch James	Mitch James
41	Harry Styles	Fine Line
42	Juice Wrld	Goodbye & Good Riddance
43	Dean Lewis	A Place We Knew
44	Dua Lipa	Dua Lipa
45	Juice Wrld	Death Race for Love
46	Taylor Swift	Reputation
47	Tool	Fear Inoculum
48	Mac Miller	Swimming
49	Rita Ora	Phoenix
50	Bazzi	Cosmic

== Top 20 albums by New Zealand artists ==
Rank	Artist	Title
1	Six60	Six60 EP
2	Six60	Six60 (3)
3	Six60	Six60 (2)
4	Various Artists	Offering
5	Six60	Six60 (1)
6	Various Artists	Waiata / Anthems
7	Mitch James	Mitch James
8	Fat Freddy's Drop	Based on a True Story
9	Drax Project	Drax Project
10	Various Artists	Moana: Original Motion Picture Soundtrack
11	L.A.B.	L.A.B.
12	Sons of Zion	Vantage Point
13	Lorde	Melodrama
14	Drax Project	Noon
15	Benee	Fire on Marzz
16	L.A.B.	L.A.B. II
17	Aldous Harding	Designer
18	Dennis Marsh	Backyard Party
19	Crowded House	The Very Very Best Of
20	Broods	Don't Feed the Pop Monster
