= Elvira Anderfjärd =

Swedish record producer and songwriter

- Born: 1 August 1999 (age 27)
- Other name: Elvira
- Occupations: Record producer; songwriter; background vocalist
- Years active: 2018–present

Elvira Anderfjärd (born 1 August 1999), also known mononymously as Elvira, is a Swedish record producer and songwriter. She achieved prominence after remixing the singles "Willow" (2020), "Love Story (Taylor's Version)" (2021), and producing "Message in a Bottle" (2021) and "Girl at Home (Taylor's Version)" (2021) by Taylor Swift.

Anderfjärd produced the Swedish Sverigetopplistan top-20 singles "I Do Me" by Malou Prytz and "I'm Coming" by Tove Lo, as well as contributed backing vocals on the Weeknd's "Take My Breath" and Swift's "Message in a Bottle", both which reached the top 10 on the United States Adult Top 40 chart. She helped write and produce Addison Rae's "Diet Pepsi" (2024) which was the artist's first Hot 100 single, peaking at 54. She has worked with various artists including Katy Perry, Anne-Marie, Ed Sheeran, Tove Styrke, Alma, Benee, First Aid Kit, Conan Gray, and Maisie Peters.

== Career ==
In high school, she studied jazz piano, and taught herself to play cello. After graduating, she abandoned her plans of becoming a nurse, to focus on music production. Influenced by Australian record producer Flume, Anderfjärd gained first production jobs throughout 2018 and 2019, working on "4U" (2018) by Joakim Molitor featuring Cher Lloyd, debut single of Malou Prytz "I Do Me" (2019), and a remix of Tove Lo's "Glad He's Gone" (2019).

In 2020, she joined Max Martin-owned MxM Publishing. She produced two singles from the 2020 reissue of Tove Lo's 2019 album Sunshine Kitty "I'm Coming" and "Sadder Badder Cooler", as well as "What Makes a Woman" (2020) from Katy Perry's sixth studio album Smile (2020). In the following months, she remixed two Taylor Swift songs "Willow" (2020) and "Love Story (Taylor's Version)" (2021), which resulted in speculation about the producer, due to lack of her presence in social media. Both remixes amassed 11 million streams on Spotify, as reported by Billboard on 15 April 2021.

During 2021, Anderfjärd worked on Molly Sandén's "Kärlek Slutar Alltid Med Bråk", Anne-Marie's "Beautiful", and Swift's "Girl at Home (Taylor's Version)" and "Message in a Bottle". She produced another song for Tove Lo, "Cute & Cruel," for the singer's fifth album Dirt Femme (2022). Two years later, she was one of the producers of Alma's Time Machine and Maisie Peters' The Good Witch (both 2023).

In 2025, she was credited as a writer and producer on Addison Rae's debut album, Addison, along with Luka Kloser and Rae herself. The trio was awarded The Future is Female award by Variety for "breaking the glass ceiling by writing, producing and performing [the] Grammy-nominated debut album entirely themselves."

== Discography ==
=== Featured singles ===
- Osrin featuring Elvira ― "20 and Lost"

=== Production discography ===
Year	Title	Artist(s)	Album	Songwriter	Producer	Background vocalist	Other roles
2018	"4U"	Joakim Molitor featuring Cher Lloyd	Non-album singles	check	X mark	check	
2019	"I Do Me"	Malou Prytz	Non-album singles	check	check	X mark	
2019	"Everyday"	Sannah	Non-album singles	X mark	check	X mark	
2019	"Sura miner"	Arvid Lundquist	Non-album singles	check	X mark	X mark	
2019	"20 and Lost"	Osrin featuring Elvira	Non-album singles	check	X mark	X mark	Vocalist
2020	"I'm Coming"	Tove Lo	Sunshine Kitty (Paw Prints Edition)	X mark	check	check	
2020	"Bad"	Oriana	Non-album single	check	X mark	X mark	
2020	"Sadder Badder Cooler"	Tove Lo	Sunshine Kitty (Paw Prints Edition)	check	check	check	Programmer, drums, electric bass, synthesizer
2020	"What Makes a Woman"	Katy Perry	Smile	X mark	check	check	Programmer, bass, drums, electric guitar, organ
2020	"Buzz buzz hop hop"	Tove Lo	At Home with the Kids	X mark	check	X mark	
2020	"One Day Left"	Lova	Grown-ish	check	check	check	Programmer, bass guitar, cello, drums, keyboards, percussion
2021	"Kärlek Slutar Alltid Med Bråk"	Molly Sandén	Dom ska veta	check	check	check	Programmer
2021	"Noise Cancellation"	Molly Sandén	Dom ska veta	check	check	X mark	
2021	"Lillebror"	Molly Sandén	Dom ska veta	check	check	X mark	
2021	"Beautiful"	Anne-Marie	Therapy	check	check	X mark	Programmer, bass
2021	"Screw Feelings"	Au/Ra	Soundtrack to an Existential Crisis	check	check	check	Engineer, programmer
2021	"Take My Breath"	The Weeknd	Dawn FM	X mark	X mark	check	
2021	"Leave Your Life"	Ed Sheeran	=	X mark	check	check	Programmer
2021	"Girl at Home (Taylor's Version)"	Taylor Swift	Red (Taylor's Version)	X mark	check	check	Programmer, recording engineering
2021	"Message in a Bottle"	Taylor Swift	Red (Taylor's Version)	X mark	check	check	Programmer
2022	"One More Time"	Luka Kloser	Moonfall (Original Mation Picture Soundtrack)	check	check	X mark	
2022	"Someone Always Knows"	Paula Jivén	The Duality In Me	check	check	check	Programmer
2022	"Hardcore"	Tove Styrke	Hard	check	check	check	
2022	"I Wanna Die"	Grant	Truth & Consequences	check	X mark	X mark	
2022	"I Can't Help But Being Jelaous Looking at the Sky"	Grant	Truth & Consequences	check	X mark	X mark	
2022	"No Time (For My Life to Suck)"	Nina Nesbitt	Älskar	check	check	X mark	
2022	"Summer Really Hurt Us"	Alma	Time Machine	X mark	X mark	X mark	Co-producer
2022	"Cute & Cruel"	Tove Lo featuring First Aid Kit	Dirt Femme	check	check	X mark	
2022	"It's My Life"	Paula Jivén	Non-album single	X mark	check	check	Programmer
2023	"Hey Mom Hey Dad"	Alma	Time Machine	check	check	X mark	
2023	"Green Honda"	Benee	Non-album single	check	check	check	Programmer
2023	"Kids in Love"	Pink featuring First Aid Kit	Trustfall	X mark	X mark	check	
2023	"Natalia"	Alma	Time Machine	check	check	X mark	
2023	"Time Machine"	Alma	Time Machine	check	check	X mark	
2023	"Tell Mama"	Alma	Time Machine	check	X mark	X mark	
2023	"Dreaming"	Alma	Time Machine	check	check	X mark	
2023	"One in a Million"	Alma	Time Machine	check	check	X mark	
2023	"Stupid People"	Alma	Time Machine	check	check	X mark	
2023	"Coming of Age"	Maisie Peters	The Good Witch	check	check	check	Programmer, bass, drums, guitar, keyboards
2023	"Holy Revival"	Maisie Peters	The Good Witch (Deluxe)	check	check	check	Programmer, bass, drums, guitar, keyboards
2023	"Guy on a Horse"	Maisie Peters	The Good Witch (Deluxe)	check	check	check	Programmer, bass, drums, guitar, keyboards
2023	"Bourgeoisieses"	Conan Gray	Found Heaven	X mark	X mark	check	
2023	"Boys & Girls"	Conan Gray	Found Heaven	X mark	X mark	check	
2024	"How Sweet"	NewJeans	How Sweet	check	X mark	X mark	
2024	"Diet Pepsi"	Addison Rae	Addison	check	check	check	Engineer, keyboards, programmer
2024	"Aquamarine"	Addison Rae	Addison	check	check	check	Engineer, keyboards, programmer
2025	"High Fashion"	Addison Rae	Addison	check	check	check	Engineer, keyboards, programmer
2025	"Headphones On"	Addison Rae	Addison	check	check	check	Engineer, keyboards, programmer, cello
2025	"Fame Is a Gun"	Addison Rae	Addison	check	check	check	Engineer, keyboards, programmer
2025	"New York"	Addison Rae	Addison	check	check	check	Engineer, keyboards, programmer
2025	"Money Is Everything"	Addison Rae	Addison	check	check	check	Engineer, keyboards, programmer
2025	"Lost & Found"	Addison Rae	Addison	check	check	check	Engineer, keyboards, programmer
2025	"Summer Forever"	Addison Rae	Addison	check	check	check	Engineer, keyboards, programmer
2025	"In the Rain"	Addison Rae	Addison	check	check	check	Engineer, keyboards, programmer
2025	"Times Like These"	Addison Rae	Addison	check	check	check	Engineer, keyboards, programmer
2025	"Life's No Fun Through Clear Waters"	Addison Rae	Addison	check	check	check	Engineer, keyboards, programmer
2025	"Off the Rails"	Benee	Ur an Angel I'm Just Particles	check	check	check	Engineer, programmer
2025	"Chaotic & Confused"	Jeon Somi	Chaotic & Confused	check	X mark	X mark	
2025	"Sunset Tower"	Conan Gray	Wishbone	check	check	X mark	Bass, drums, keyboards, percussion, string arrangement, strings

=== Remixes ===
- Tove Lo – "Glad He's Gone" (2019)
- Taylor Swift – "Willow" (2020)
- Taylor Swift – "Love Story (Taylor's Version)" (2021)

== Awards and nominations ==
Award	Year	Nominee(s)	Category	Result	Ref.
Denniz Pop Awards	2020	Herself	Rookie songwriter/producer	Won	
Grammis	2022	Herself	Producer of the Year	Won	
Variety Hitmakers Awards	2025	Herself with Addison Rae and Luka Kloser	The Future Is Female Award	Won	
