= Off the Rails (song) =

2025 single by Benee

Single by Benee

from the album Ur an Angel I'm Just Particles
- Released: 20 June 2025
- Length: 1:47
- Label: Republic
- Songwriters: Stella Bennett; Elvira Anderfjärd; Luka Kloser
- Producers: Elvira Anderfjärd; Luka Kloser

Benee singles chronology
"Animal" (2024)	"Off the Rails" (2025)	"Cinnamon" (2025)

Music video
- "Off the Rails" on YouTube

"Off the Rails" is a song by New Zealand singer Benee. It was released through Republic Records on 20 June 2025, as the third single from her second studio album, Ur an Angel I'm Just Particles. The song peaked at number 30 on the New Zealand Hot Singles Chart and number 3 on the Hot 20 Aotearoa Singles Chart.

== Background ==
Speaking about the song to Rolling Stone Australia, Benee said: "It's an aggressive, angry, chaotic product of my navigating the current state of the world and channeling my existential dread." In an interview with Stereogum, Benee spoke about the background of the song and said:

Luka and Elvira are two incredible producers in the music industry right now. First we made "Green Honda," and then "Off The Rails." I felt this energy was really needed and perfectly places a certain tone in my storyline. It honestly was one of the few studio sessions I’ve ever done with only women, which brings such a different creative energy. I felt so comfortable really saying anything. In a typically male-dominated industry, I had a different connection with them. We had a lot of fun making this song and I love it, I hope listeners do too!

== Critical reception ==
Tom Breihan of Stereogum called the track a "bratty, deliriously, guitar-driven pop jam" and reminds him of "'90s alt-bubblegum bangers" and Sarah Space of Melodic Magazine called it "chaotic and supersonic, complete with crashing drums, heavy electric guitar, and synth elements combined with additional distorted vocals and echoes that leave listeners struggling to catch their breath."

== Charts ==
Chart (2023)	Peak position
New Zealand Hot Singles (RMNZ)	30
New Zealand Artist Hot Singles (RMNZ)	3
