= Fridafors =

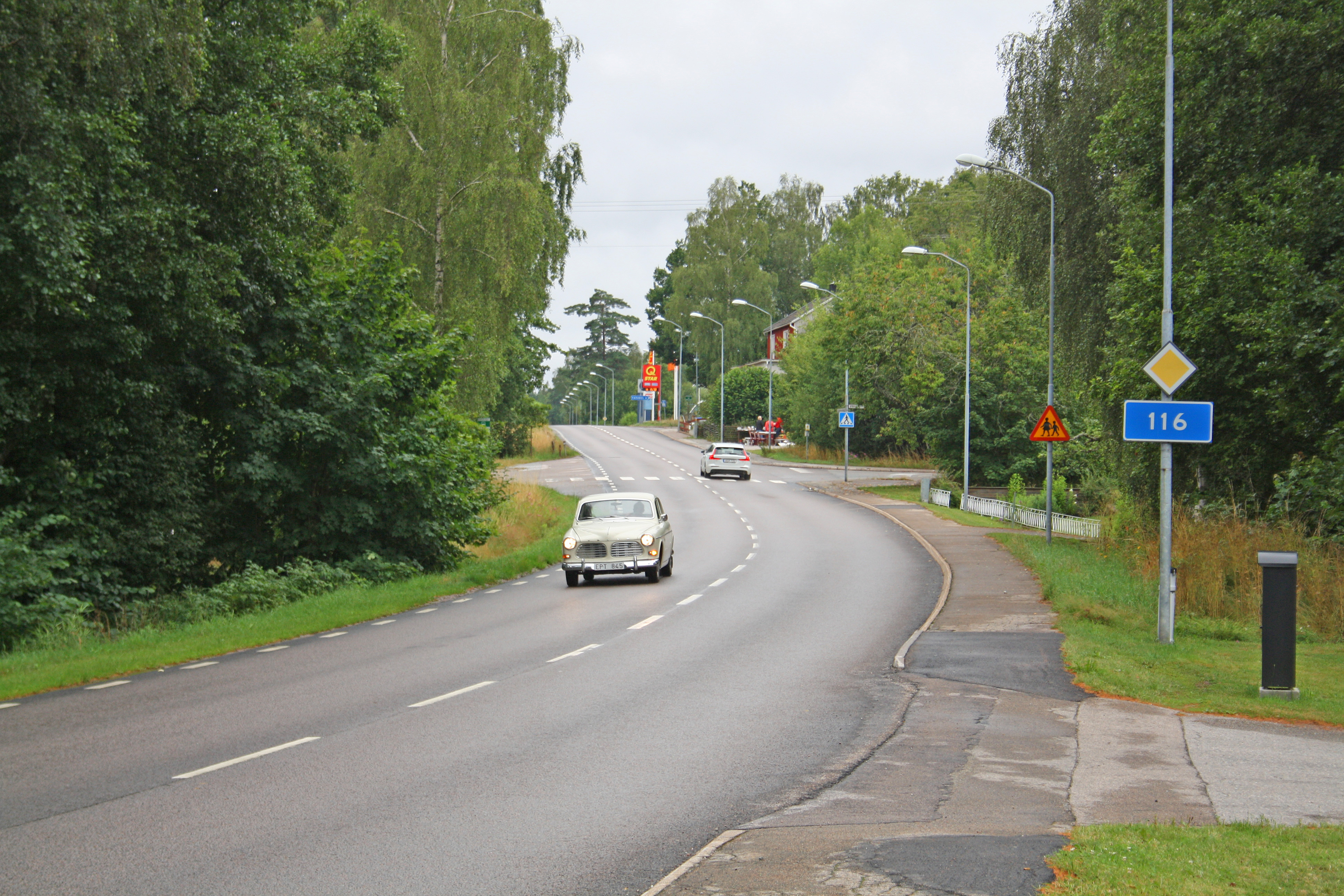

- Location within Kronoberg Location within Sweden
- Coordinates: 56°25′N 14°39′E
- Country: Sweden
- Province: Småland
- County: Kronoberg County
- Municipality: Tingsryd Municipality

Area
  - Total: 0.83 km^{2} (0.32 sq mi)

Population (31 December 2010)
  - Total: 221
  - Density: 268/km^{2} (690/sq mi)
- Time zone: UTC+1 (CET)
  - Summer (DST): UTC+2 (CEST)

Fridafors is a locality situated in Tingsryd Municipality, Kronoberg County, Sweden with 221 inhabitants in 2010.
