= MTV Europe Music Award for Best New Zealand Act =

Category of MTV Europe Music Awards

The following is a list of the MTV Europe Music Award winners and nominees for Best New Zealand Act.

== Winners and nominees ==
Winners are listed first and highlighted in bold.

=== 2010s ===
Year	Artist	Ref
2013
2013	**Lorde**	
2013	David Dallas	
2013	Shapeshifter	
2013	Stan Walker	
2013	The Naked and Famous	
2014
2014	**Lorde**	
2014	Stan Walker	
2014	Broods	
2014	Ginny Blackmore	
2014	Kimbra	
2014	Pre-nominations: Benny Tipene; David Dallas; K.One; P-Money	
2015
2015	**Savage**	
2015	Avalanche City	
2015	Gin Wigmore	
2015	Six60	
2015	Broods	
2016
2016	**Broods**	
2016	Kings	
2016	Ladyhawke	
2016	Maala	
2016	Sachi	
2017
2017	**Tapz**	
2017	David Dallas	
2017	Lorde	
2017	Maala	
2017	Stan Walker	
2018
2018	**Mitch James**	
2018	Stan Walker	
2018	Kimbra	
2018	Robinson	
2018	Thomston	
2019
2019	**JessB**	
2019	Benee	
2019	Broods	
2019	Drax Project	
2019	Kings	

=== 2020s ===
Year	Artist	Ref
2020
2020	**Benee**	
2020	Baynk	
2020	Jawsh 685	
2020	L.A.B.	
2020	The Naked and Famous	
2021
2021	**Teeks**	
2021	Broods	
2021	Jolyon Petch	
2021	Lorde	
2021	Six60	
2022
2022	**Lorde**	
2022	Benee	
2022	Coterie	
2022	L.A.B.	
2022	Shouse	
2023
2023	**Six60**	
2023	Benee	
2023	JessB	
2023	Jolyon Petch	
2023	L.A.B.	
2024	Not awarded	
2025	Awards not held	

== See also ==
- Viewers Choice New Zealand at MTV Australia Awards
