= Message in a Bottle (Taylor Swift song) =

2021 single by Taylor Swift

- Fat Max G remix cover

Single by Taylor Swift

from the album Red (Taylor's Version)
- Released: November 15, 2021
- Studio: Kitty Committee (Belfast); House Mouse (Stockholm)
- Genre: Electropop; dance-pop; synth-pop
- Length: 3:45
- Label: Republic
- Songwriters: Taylor Swift; Max Martin; Shellback
- Producers: Elvira Anderfjärd; Shellback

Taylor Swift singles chronology
"I Bet You Think About Me" (2021)	"Message in a Bottle" (2021)	"The Joker and the Queen" (2022)

Lyric video
- "Message in a Bottle" on YouTube

"Message In A Bottle" (Note: subtitled (Taylor's Version) (From the Vault).) is a song by the American singer-songwriter Taylor Swift. It was her first writing collaboration with Max Martin and Shellback. The song was intended for but excluded from her fourth studio album, Red (2012). Shellback and Elvira Anderfjärd produced the track for Swift's re-recorded album, Red (Taylor's Version) (2021). "Message in a Bottle" is a 1980s-influenced electropop, dance-pop, and synth-pop song with lyrics about the anxiety from falling in love.

Republic Records issued the song to the US hot AC and mainstream radio formats as a single following the album's release in November 2021. Music critics generally praised the song's production as catchy, although a few found it underwhelming. The song peaked at number 50 on the Billboard Global 200 and charted in Australia, the Canadian Hot 100, and the US Billboard Hot 100, among other countries. It also peaked in the top 20 on three Billboard airplay charts.

== Background ==
After ending her 13-year contract with Big Machine Records and signing a deal with Republic Records in 2018, Taylor Swift began re-recording her first six studio albums in November 2020. The decision followed a public 2019 dispute between Swift and the talent manager Scooter Braun, who acquired Big Machine, including the masters of her albums which the label had released. By re-recording the albums, Swift had full ownership of the new masters, which enabled her to control the licensing of her songs for commercial use and therefore replaced the Big Machine–owned masters.

In April 2021, Swift released her first re-recorded album: that of her 2008 studio album Fearless, subtitled Taylor's Version. In addition to the re-recorded tracks, it contained several unreleased "From the Vault" tracks that she had written but left out of the original album. On November 12, 2021, she released her second re-recorded album: that of her 2012 studio album Red, also subtitled Taylor's Version. As with its predecessor, Red (Taylor's Version) includes "From the Vault" tracks.

== Composition ==
"Message in a Bottle"
An electropop, dance-pop, and synth-pop tune, "Message in a Bottle" has a 1980s-influenced production featuring keyboards, drums, and guitars.

"Message in a Bottle" was the first song that Swift wrote with the Swedish producers Max Martin and Shellback. The two produced three songs for the original Red album: "22", "We Are Never Ever Getting Back Together", and "I Knew You Were Trouble".

"Message in a Bottle" is an uptempo electropop, dance-pop, and synth-pop tune produced by Shellback and Elvira Anderfjärd. According to the album's liner notes, both Shellback and Anderfjärd played the keyboards; the former played guitar and the latter played the bass and drums. Some critics commented that "Message in a Bottle" could have fitted into Swift's 2014 album 1989, which she described as her first official pop album. NME's Hannah Mylrea said the 1980s-influenced production evoked the music of Carly Rae Jepsen's 2015 album Emotion. Meanwhile, Laura Snapes from The Guardian said that the production evoked "tropical house via Coldplay". The lyrics are about the anxiety ensued from falling in love with somebody ("But now/You're so far away and I'm down/Feeling like a face in the crowd/I'm reaching for you, terrified").

== Release and commercial performance ==
"Message in a Bottle" is one of the vault tracks on Red (Taylor's Version), which Republic Records released on November 12, 2021; it is number 26 on the track listing. Republic released it to US hot adult contemporary radio on November 15, and the following day the song also impacted contemporary hit radio format, making it an official radio single. A remix by Fat Max G was released to digital and streaming services on January 21, 2022. Swift performed "Message in a Bottle" as a "surprise song" outside the regular set list at the Seattle concert on July 23, 2023, as part of her Eras Tour. She sang it again on the tour's Stockholm stop on May 19, 2024, as part of a medley with her songs "New Romantics" and "How You Get the Girl".

After Red (Taylor's Version) was released, "Message in a Bottle" debuted and peaked at number 45 on the US Billboard Hot 100 chart dated November 27, 2021. The single also charted on three Billboard airplay charts. On Adult Pop Songs, it debuted at number 36 on the chart dated November 20, 2021, after three days of tracing, marking Swift's record-extending 36th entry, and peaked at number 10. It peaked at number 11 on Adult Contemporary and number 17 on Pop Songs. The track peaked at number 50 on the Billboard Global 200 and the singles charts of Australia (33) and the Canadian Hot 100 (32).

== Critical reception ==
"Message in a Bottle" received generally positive reviews. Mylrea called the song a "effervescent nugget of pure-pop". Paul Bridgewater of The Line of Best Fit labeled the track "A-grade Swift", while Beth Kirkbride of Clash thought that the electronic soundscape contributed to the diverse musical styles of Red (Taylor's Version). Ranking "Message in a Bottle" third among the nine vault tracks on the album, Billboard's Jason Lipshutz described the track as "compact, propulsive" with "the same energy (and crackling charm)" as the songs that pushed Swift's artistry towards the album 1989. Jonathan Keefe of Slant Magazine said that "Message in a Bottle" had as catchy a hook as Swift's singles "We Are Never Ever Getting Back Together" and "Shake It Off", but he said that it did not have "the self-conscious repetitions of those hits".

Variety's Chris Willman gave the song a four-star rating; he opined that the "thoroughly infectious" track had "a strong shot for hit single status" but added that "as good as it is, you can imagine almost anyone in pop singing it". Josh Kurp of Uproxx placed "Message in a Bottle" fifth on his ranking of Swift's 26 vault tracks on her Taylor's Version re-recordings; he predicted that it would become one of Swift's most memorable tracks thanks to its earworm quality. Time's critics ranked it 13th out of 25 vault songs; Annabel Gutterman described it as "upbeat, punchy", and "fun".

Pitchfork's Olivia Horn gave a lukewarm review, complimenting the production but criticizing its "dearth of personality". Snapes deemed "Message in a Bottle" generic and inferior compared to "22", another pop song that was included in the original 2012 album. Rob Sheffield from Rolling Stone agreed that "Message in a Bottle" sounded too similar to "22", which made it understandable that Swift left it out of the original Red.

== Track listing ==
All tracks are noted as "Taylor's Version".

Digital download and streaming

1. "Message in a Bottle" (Fat Max G Remix) – 3:45
2. "Message in a Bottle" (From the Vault) – 3:47

Digital download and streaming

1. "Message in a Bottle" (Fat Max G Remix) – 3:45
2. "Message in a Bottle" (From the Vault) – 3:46
3. "Message in a Bottle" (From the Vault) (lyric video) – 3:46

== Credits and personnel ==
Credits are adapted from the liner notes of Red (Taylor's Version).

- Taylor Swift – lead vocals, songwriting
- Shellback – songwriting, production, programming, keyboards, guitars
- Max Martin – songwriting
- Elvira Anderfjärd – production, programming, keyboards, drums, bass, backing vocals
- Randy Merrill – mastering
- Serban Ghenea – mixing
- John Hanes – engineering
- Christopher Rowe – vocal engineering

Fat Max G Remix

- Taylor Swift – lead vocals, songwriting
- Shellback – songwriting
- Max Martin – songwriting
- Fat Max Gsus – production, remixing, bass, drums, percussion, programming, synthesizer, vocal production
- Randy Merrill – masters engineering
- Serban Ghenea – mixing
- John Hanes – immersive mix engineering
- Christopher Rowe – vocal engineering

== Charts ==
=== Weekly charts ===
Weekly chart performance
Chart (2021–2022)	Peak position
Australia (ARIA)	33
Canada Hot 100 (Billboard)	32
Canada AC (Billboard)	13
Canada CHR/Top 40 (Billboard)	15
Canada Hot AC (Billboard)	7
Global 200 (Billboard)	50
Japan Hot Overseas (Billboard)	16
New Zealand Hot Singles (RMNZ)	12
UK Audio Streaming (Official Charts)	71
US Billboard Hot 100	45
US Adult Contemporary (Billboard)	11
US Adult Pop Airplay (Billboard)	10
US Pop Airplay (Billboard)	17

=== Year-end charts ===
Year-end chart performance
Chart (2022)	Position
US Adult Contemporary (Billboard)	23
US Adult Top 40 (Billboard)	29

== Certifications ==
Certification for "Message in a Bottle"
Region	Certification	Certified units/sales
Australia (ARIA)	Platinum	70,000^{‡}
United Kingdom (BPI)	Silver	200,000^{‡}
^{‡} Sales+streaming figures based on certification alone.

== Release history ==
Release dates and formats
Region	Date	Format(s)	Version	Label	Ref.
United States	November 15, 2021	Hot adult contemporary radio	Original	Republic	
United States	November 16, 2021	Contemporary hit radio	Original	Republic	
Various	January 21, 2022	Digital download; streaming	Fat Max G remix	Republic	
Italy	January 21, 2022	Radio airplay	Original	Universal	
