= Ballerina (Malou Prytz song) =

Single by Malou Prytz
- Released: February 1, 2020
- Length: 3:02
- Label: The Bank Music
- Songwriter(s): Jimmy Jansson; Peter Boström; Thomas G:son
- Producer(s): Peter Boström

Malou Prytz singles chronology
"Left & Right" (2019)	"Ballerina" (2020)

"Ballerina" is a song by Swedish singer Malou Prytz. The song was performed for the first time in Melodifestivalen 2020, where it made it to the second chance round. The song was written by Jimmy Jansson, Peter Boström and Thomas G:son, while being produced by Boström alone.

== Charts ==
Chart (2020)	Peak position
Sweden (Sverigetopplistan)	40
