= I Do Me =

Single by Malou Prytz
- Released: 23 February 2019
- Genre: Pop
- Label: The Bank Music
- Songwriters: Isa Tengblad; Fanny Arnesson; Adéle Cechal; Elvira Anderfjärd
- Producer: Elvira Anderfjärd

Malou Prytz singles chronology
"I Do Me" (2019)	"Left & Right" (2019)

"I Do Me" is a song by Swedish singer Malou Prytz. The song was performed for the first time in Melodifestivalen 2019, where it made it to the final. The song came 12th in the grand final after coming 2nd in the second semi-final.

== Charts ==
Chart (2019)	Peak position
Sweden (Sverigetopplistan)	10
