= Linneryd =

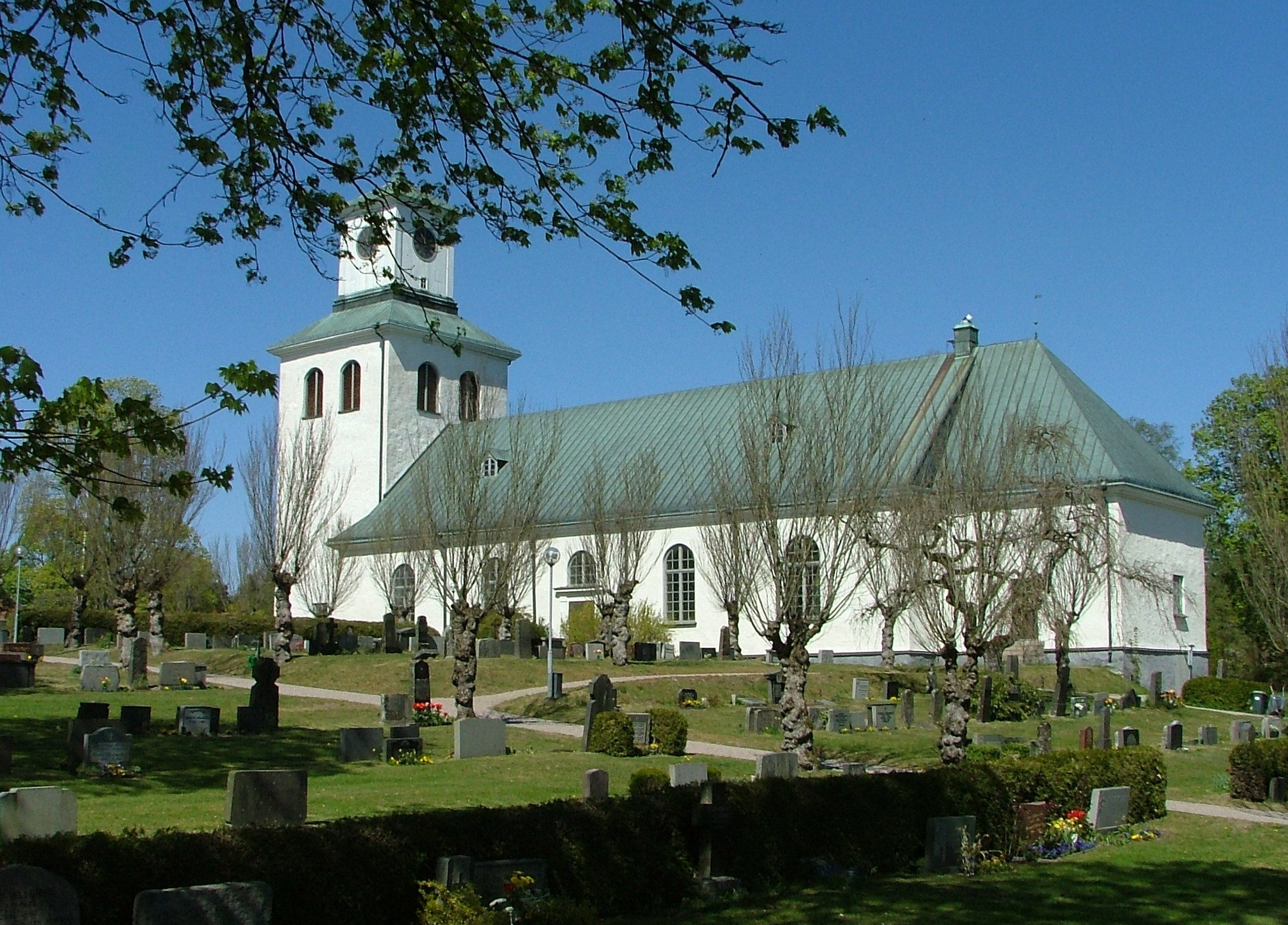
- Linneryd Church in May 2009

- Location within Kronoberg Location within Sweden
- Coordinates: 56°40′N 15°07′E
- Country: Sweden
- Province: Småland
- County: Kronoberg County
- Municipality: Tingsryd Municipality

Area
  - Total: 1.20 km^{2} (0.46 sq mi)

Population (31 December 2010)
  - Total: 488
  - Density: 406/km^{2} (1,050/sq mi)
- Time zone: UTC+1 (CET)
  - Summer (DST): UTC+2 (CEST)

Linneryd is a locality situated in Tingsryd Municipality, Kronoberg County, Sweden with 488 inhabitants in 2010.
