= Sunday Morning (Mitch James song) =

2019 single by Mitch James

Single by Mitch James
- Released: 22 November 2019
- Genre: Pop
- Length: 3:23
- Label: Sony Music New Zealand
- Songwriters: Anthony Egizii; David Musumeci; Mike Waters; Mitch James
- Producer: DNA Songs

Mitch James singles chronology
"Bright Blue Skies" (2019)	"Sunday Morning" (2019)	"Be Somebody" (2021)

Music video
- "Sunday Morning" on YouTube

"Sunday Morning" is a song by New Zealand musician Mitch James. Originally intended as the lead single from his second album, it was released on 22 November 2019 and was a hit in New Zealand, becoming the 13th most successful New Zealand song in 2020.

== Background and writing ==
The song was written in August 2018 in Sydney, alongside Australian production duo DNA, who cowrote the song with James. The composition was inspired by events in James' personal life, and describes the break-up of a long-term relationship. James was inspired to write about the feelings of being used at the end of the relationship, and incorporated the imagery of sinners going to church on Sunday mornings. After recording, the song was mixed by Simon Gooding at Roundhead Studios.

== Composition ==
"Sunday Morning" is a pop song, that describes the difficulties of wanting to be in a relationship with someone who has major differences and differences in values.

== Release and commercial reception ==
"Sunday Morning" was released as a single on 22 November 2019, with a music video being released a month later on 13 December. The song debuted at number 37 in New Zealand in December, returning to the charts for two weeks in February 2020. It was certified gold in early March 2020, and platinum in August of the same year. By the end of 2020, it had become the 13th most successful New Zealand song of the year.

== Critical reception ==
Music critic Thomas Bleach reviewed the song positively, describing it as "showcasing a more playful side" of James. He praised the lyrics as "candidly honest", the melody as "soothingly sweet", and likened the production to Ed Sheeran and Dean Lewis, noting it was "bolder and brighter" than James' previous works.

== Credits and personnel ==
Credits adapted from Tidal.

- DNA – producer
- Anthony Egizii – writer
- Simon Gooding – engineer, mixing engineer
- Stuart Hawkes – mastering engineer
- Mitch James – vocalist, writer
- David Musumeci – writer
- Mike Waters – writer

== Charts ==
=== Weekly charts ===
Chart (2019–20)	Peak position
New Zealand (Recorded Music NZ)	37

=== Year-end charts ===
Chart (2020)	Position
New Zealand Artist Top 50 Singles (RMNZ)	13

== Certifications ==
Region	Certification	Certified units/sales
New Zealand (RMNZ)	Platinum	30,000^{‡}
^{‡} Sales+streaming figures based on certification alone.
