= Times Like These (Addison Rae song) =

2025 song by Addison Rae

Song by Addison Rae

from the album Addison
- Released: June 6, 2025
- Studio: MXM
- Genre: Trip hop
- Length: 3:52
- Label: Columbia; As Long As I'm Dancing
- Songwriters: Addison Rae; Elvira Anderfjärd; Luka Kloser
- Producers: Elvira Anderfjärd; Luka Kloser

Music video
- "Times Like These" on YouTube

"Times Like These" is a song by American singer Addison Rae from her debut studio album, Addison, released through Columbia Records and As Long As I'm Dancing LLC on June 6, 2025. It is a trip hop track written by Rae and its producers, Elvira Anderfjärd and Luka Kloser. A reflective and tender number, it talks about Rae's struggles in life. "Times Like These" received an accompanying music video, set as a behind-the-scenes montage of a dance performance, directed by Ethan James Green. Rae debuted the song live during the album listening event in New York City which was also featured in the setlist of her debut concert The Addison Tour in 2025.

== Background and composition ==
In April 2025, Rae announced that her debut studio album would be released on June 6 during her surprise appearance during Arca's set at Coachella 2025, later revealing the album title and its cover art at the end of the month. In May, the album tracks were revealed through billboards located in various cities, before Rae officially announced the track listing on May 21, placing "Times Like These" as the tenth song on the album. On June 4, she unveiled that in tandem with the album's release, the music video for "Times Like These" would be released. The following day, she debuted the song live as the encore of an exclusive album release event hosted at The Box in New York City. She performed it again days later at the venue's sister club in London. Billboard's Kristen Wisneski opined it was an "ideal" way to finish the setlist by putting the fans in a "reflective mood".

"Times Like These" was written by Addison Rae, Elvira Anderfjärd, and Luka Kloser, with the latter two handling the track's production, programming, and engineering. Its lyrics have been described as "introspective", "maudlin", "lamenting", and "affecting", surrounded by "dreamy", "sultry", "gently euphoric", and "meditative" trip hop. The track, described as "tender" and "emotional", talks about daily struggles of Rae's life. Its sound was compared to Frou Frou and 1990s music, particularly Madonna's Ray of Light (1998).

== Critical reception ==
James Greig of Dazed called the song "so dreamy and sultry and gently euphoric," praising Rae for keeping a "distinctive sound" while being inspired by Madonna's works from the 1990s, All Saints and "that kind of Balearic The Beach soundtrack atmosphere". Billboard and The Fader likened "Times Like These" to "In the Rain", with the former saying that "Times Like These" is its "angrier sister," while the latter called them "easy, unfussy, designed to just make you just feel good." Maya Georgi of Rolling Stone also compared the two "R&B-inflected" tracks that "push the fantastical feel of the album incrementally further with bass lines that desperately want to boom even louder," as did Carson Mlnarik of Nylon who commented that even the album's slower moments "refuse to slump down to ballad level." Marcus Adetola characterized its sound as "simultaneously nostalgic and forward-looking" which "mirrors the emotional state of the lyrics," adding that it is "moody without being depressing, danceable without being escapist."

Giselle Libby of Ones to Watch called it an "introspective masterpiece," writing that, "in typical Addison fashion, not once does this confusion feel like a setback, only inspiration born from acceptance. This song feels like the real beginning of Addison's journey, a step into the unknown, fully ready to receive." Clash's Sam Franzini described it as "an affecting number about quick-moving fame" and a "pop song as sleek as ever, replete with small, clever moments like a Radiohead-like melody thats starts [the track]." Alexander Mooney of Slant Magazine complimented the song for its introspective lyrics paired with "rich, ebullient beats," noting that despite themes of overwhelm, "Rae’s tenor is unshakably celebratory." Although Screen Rant's Paul Elliott gave the song a positive review, placing it as the third best song of Addison, he opined the track would benefit from having a featured artist on it.

== Music video ==
The music video for "Times Like These" was released on June 6, 2025, and was directed by photographer and filmmaker Ethan James Green, who also shot the album cover photoshoot, marking his directorial debut in music. The visual is structured as a behind-the-scenes montage concluding with a dance performance. The video begins as Rae and her love interest, played by TikTok star Gio (known on the platform as Giovanni's Kitchen), are shown on a Staten Island Ferry. During the video, she applies Armani Beauty make-up cosmetics; Nylon's Chelsea Peng opined that the purple blush on her cheeks is more "editorial" than pink. According to Elliott, the video "helps bring the lyrics to life", while Adetola noticed that "Times Like These" visual features a reversed color progression than in the "Diet Pepsi" music video (2024).

== Credits and personnel ==
Credits adapted from Tidal.

- Addison Rae – vocals, songwriting
- Elvira Anderfjärd – background vocals, keyboards, programming, production, engineering
- Luka Kloser – background vocals, keyboards, songwriting, production, programming, engineering
- Serban Ghenea – mixing
- Bryce Bordone – assistant mixing engineering
- Randy Merrill – mastering

== Charts ==
Chart performance for "Times Like These"
Chart (2025)	Peak position
New Zealand Hot Singles (RMNZ)	7
