= Ryd, Tingsryd Municipality =

Ryd
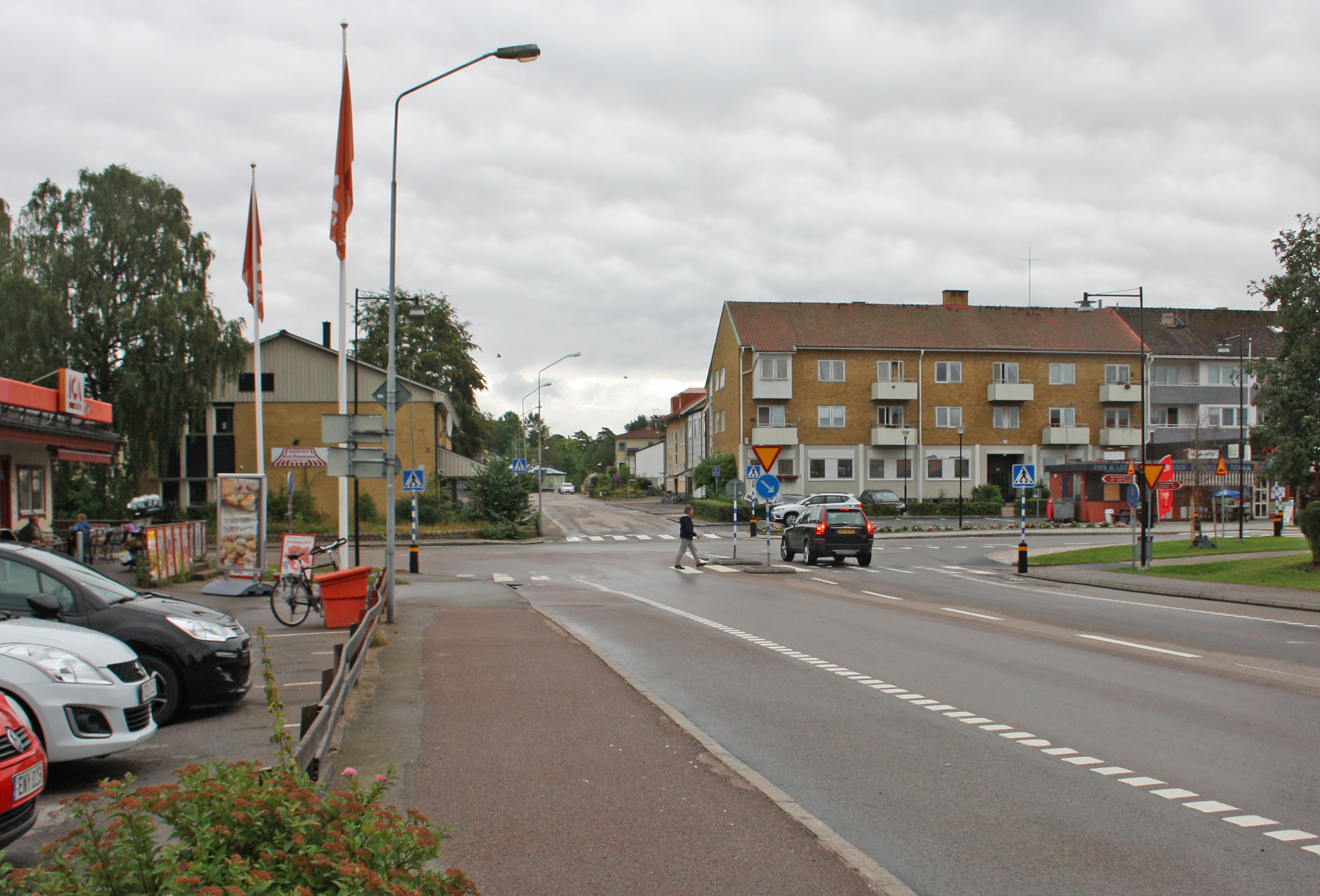
- The centre of Ryd, Tingsryd municipality, 2019.

- Location within Kronoberg Location within Sweden
- Coordinates: 56°28′N 14°42′E
- Country: Sweden
- Province: Småland
- County: Kronoberg County
- Municipality: Tingsryd Municipality

Area
  - Total: 2.06 km^{2} (0.80 sq mi)

Population (31 December 2010)
  - Total: 1,415
  - Density: 686/km^{2} (1,780/sq mi)
- Time zone: UTC+1 (CET)
  - Summer (DST): UTC+2 (CEST)

Ryd is a locality situated in Tingsryd Municipality, Kronoberg County, Sweden with a population of 1,318 as of 2023.

== Notable people ==
- Malou Prytz
