= Lychee (EP) =

EP by Benee
- Released: 4 March 2022
- Length: 25:46
- Label: Republic
- Producer: Greg Kurstin; Kenny Beats; Josh Fountain; Rostam

Benee chronology
Hey U X (2020)	Lychee (2022)	Ur an Angel I'm Just Particles (2025)

Singles from Lychee
- 1. "Doesn't Matter" Released: 11 October 2021; 2. "Beach Boy" Released: 3 February 2022; 3. "Never Ending" Released: 4 March 2022

Lychee is the third extended play by New Zealand singer-songwriter Benee released on 4 March 2022 through Republic Records. Consisting of seven tracks and a duration of around twenty-five minutes, it was primarily produced by Josh Fountain, who was accompanied by Greg Kurstin, Kenny Beats, and Rostam. The album centers on emotional turmoil, relationships, and personal growth. For its concept and title, Bennett was having trouble choosing an adequate title, so she had decided to go with a name of something she loved.

== Background and recording ==
Lychee was expected to have an experimental approach. She named the EP after the fruit of the same name as she was having trouble choosing a satisfactory title, so she went with the name of something she loved. Much of Lychee was developed and recorded in Los Angeles with a number of well-known producers, specifically Kenny Beats, Greg Kurstin, and Rostam. Benee had never previously collaborated with the latter two musicians. She also initially worked on the project in her home country of New Zealand with regular collaborator Josh Fountain.

However, she preferred engaging in the creative process in Los Angeles due to stringent COVID-19 lockdown measures in place at the time in New Zealand, which made her feel hopeless and at a loss for song ideas. She additionally considered collaborating with Fountain, though a positive experience, to not push her out of her comfort zone enough.

== Composition ==
The opening track, "Beach Boy", was described by Benee as a "pure fantasy" set in Los Angeles. Lyrically, it discusses the conflicting feelings of the early stages of a relationship, where one may simultaneously be content with being alone and also still crave romance. Its indie sound was inspired by the Japanese House. Second track "Soft Side" contains hyperpop and house influences, while Benee made "Hurt You, Gus" to channel the energy she felt during New Zealand's lockdowns. Fourth track "Never Ending" incorporates elements of rock music and is followed by "Marry Myself", which has a lighter tone that is infused with drum and bass.

"Doesn't Matter" is a "mellow" song about Benee's attempts to cope with her mental health issues, including an obsessive–compulsive disorder diagnosis, and how people often misunderstand the realities of mental health problems. It is another song she created to channel her lockdown anxiety and was one of the first made for Lychee overall. "Make You Sick" is a "trippy" experimental electronic song with freestyled lyrics. Originally thirteen minutes in length and intended for a New Zealand runway show before the COVID-19 pandemic, it was eventually cut down to just under seven minutes.

== Release and promotion ==
=== Singles ===
Before the release of Lychee, two of its tracks were released as singles: "Doesn't Matter" in October 2021 and "Beach Boy" in February 2022. The latter would be accompanied by a music video. "Never Ending" was released as a third single concurrently with the EP. The EP had reached the top 15 of the New Zealand Albums Chart.

=== Tour ===
In support of the project, Benee would embark on a North American headlining tour beginning on 31 May 2022 in Montreal before heading stateside with stops in several cities; Washington D.C., Seattle, Los Angeles, as well as festival sets at Governors Ball and Bonnaroo.

== Critical reception ==
Professional ratings
Review scores
Source	Rating
DIY	4/5 stars
God Is in the TV	7/10

Bella Martin of DIY said, "The seven-track 'Lychee' sees the New Zealander showing off a sound that's distinctly her own." Max Mazonowicz of God Is in the TV said, "Lychee is a lovely slice of chilled out slacker-pop. Opener 'Beach Boy' is an excellent slow burner, while 'Hurt You, Gus' is a beat heavy break-up song. It's a slick yet homebrew set of songs from the New Zealander and well worth your time."

== Track listing ==
Lychee track listing
No.	Title	Writer(s)	Producer(s)	Length
1.	"Beach Boy"	Stella Bennett; Greg Kurstin	Kurstin	3:12
2.	"Soft Side"	Bennett; Kenneth Blume III	Kenny Beats	2:24
3.	"Hurt You, Gus"	Bennett; Josh Fountain	Fountain	2:51
4.	"Never Ending"	Bennett; Rostam Batmanglij	Rostam	3:57
5.	"Marry Myself"	Bennett; Kurstin	Kurstin	3:02
6.	"Doesn't Matter"	Bennett; Fountain	Fountain	3:23
7.	"Make You Sick"	Bennett; Fountain	Fountain	6:47
Total length:				25:46

== Personnel ==
Credits were adapted from Tidal.

- Benee – vocals (all tracks)
- Rostam Batmanglij – acoustic guitar, drum programming, electric bass, electric guitar, synthesizer (4)
- Josh Fountain – programming (7)
- Greg Kurstin – bass, drums, guitar, keyboards, percussion, synthesizer (1)
- Josh Fountain – engineering, mixing (7), production (3, 6, 7)
- Joey Messina-Doerning – percussion (4)
- Tom Young – bass (3)
- Rostam Batmanglij – production (4)
- Julian Burg – engineering (1)
- Scott Desmarais – mixing assistance (4)
- Tom Elmhirst – engineering (6)
- Robin Florent – mixing assistance (4)
- Chris Galland – engineering (4)
- Dilip Harris – engineering (2, 3)
- Jeremie Inhaber – mixing assistance (4)
- Greg Kurstin – engineering (1), production (1, 5)
- Jan 'Stan' Kybert – engineering (2–5, 7)
- Manny Marroquin – mixing (4)
- Randy Merrill – mastering (1, 4, 6)
- Matt Scatchell – engineering (6)
- Spike Stent – mixing (1, 5)
- Matt Tuggle – engineering (1)

== Charts ==
Chart performance for Lychee
Chart (2022)	Peak position
New Zealand Albums (RMNZ)	13
