= Sad Boiii =

2024 single by Benee

Single by Benee

from the album Ur an Angel I'm Just Particles
- Released: 4 September 2024
- Length: 2:46
- Label: Republic
- Songwriters: Stella Bennett; Leroy Clampitt
- Producers: Leroy Clampitt; Spencer Zahn

Benee singles chronology
"Love Cocoon" (2023)	"Sad Boiii" (2024)	"Animal" (2024)

Music video
- "Sad Boiii" on YouTube

"Sad Boiii" is a song by New Zealand singer Benee. It was released through Republic Records on 4 September 2024, as the first single from her second studio album, Ur an Angel I'm Just Particles. The song peaked at number 25 on the New Zealand Hot Singles Chart and number 6 on the Hot 20 Aotearoa Singles Chart.

== Background ==
Speaking about the song to Rolling Stone Australia, Benee said: "I tried to write a summery and happy tune with a dark meaning. I’d go to local festivals as a kid, and I wanted to capture the vibe of the outdoor setting. A lot of New Zealand music has a reggae energy, which is very nostalgic for me." Lyrically, ‘Sad Boiii’ is about being in a relationship where you’re pissed off with the other person because he has a façade going on. Even though he pretends to be tough, he’s just another damaged boy who needs help."

== Critical reception ==
Danielle Chelosky of Stereogum called the song "groovy" and Joshua Madsen of Melodic Magazine described it as a "track filled with summer vibes and introspective lyrics."

== Charts ==
Chart (2023)	Position
New Zealand Hot Singles (RMNZ)	25
New Zealand Artist Hot Singles (RMNZ)	6
