= Mitch James =

- Born: Mitchell Digby McCallum James; 26 June 1995 (age 31)
- Origin: Auckland, New Zealand
- Genres: Pop; acoustic; folk pop; pop rock
- Occupations: Singer; songwriter; guitarist
- Instruments: Vocals; acoustic guitar
- Years active: 2015–2025
- Labels: Sony Music, Massive
- Website: mitchjamesmusic.co.nz

Mitch James (born 26 June 1995) is a New Zealand singer, songwriter and guitarist from Auckland. He is best known for his songs "Bright Blue Skies", "Sunday Morning", "No Fixed Abode", "Move On" and "21" which have featured in the Official New Zealand Music Charts. His self-titled first album debuted at No. 2 on the New Zealand chart, No. 1 on the NZ Artist Album Chart and has since been certified Platinum by Recorded Music NZ.

James announced his retirement from music following the release of his third studio album in 2024.

== Life and career ==
=== Early life ===
Mitch James was raised in Auckland, New Zealand, where he attended Saint Kentigern College. James taught himself how to play the guitar at the age of 14 by studying YouTube tutorial videos. James has stated that school "wasn't fun" for him and that music became something of a refuge. At age 16 James found inspiration in the likes of Ben Howard and Ed Sheeran. At age 17 James finished school and travelled to London on a one-way airfare in pursuit of a break into the music industry.

=== 2015–2016: Breakthrough and early releases ===
In 2015, while in Europe, James began recording and editing cover videos on his phone and sharing them on Facebook and YouTube. In 2016, New Zealand musician Maala spotted one of the videos and shared it with A&r staff at Sony Music New Zealand. James returned to New Zealand and signed with the label shortly after.

On 1 December 2016 James released his first single "No Fixed Abode" along with its accompanying music video. On 9 December 2016 James released his second single "Move On.

In March 2017, James completed The Humble Roadie Tour, a ten date national tour of New Zealand. James and his crew travelled the entire length of the tour in a custom Kombi van.

James indicated he intended to release his debut album in October/November 2017.

=== 2018–2023: Debut album and Patience ===
In May 2018, James released "21", the first single off his debut self-titled album, which was scheduled to be released in September 2018. 21 peaked at #2 on the NZ Singles chart. By October, "21" was certified Gold by RMNZ. 21 was then nominated for "Single of the Year" at the New Zealand Music Awards.

James then went on to release his self-titled debut album "Mitch James" on 14 September 2018. The album was produced by Ji Fraser and Eli Paewai of Six60. The album debuted at No. 2 on the Overall NZ Music Chart, and No. 1 on the NZ Albums Chart. The album has garnered over 100,000,000 streams as of 1 September 2019 and has since been certified Platinum in New Zealand.

James embarked on his first major headline tour of New Zealand shortly after release.

James was nominated and won MTV Europe Music Award for Best New Zealand Act in October.

In March 2018, James opened for Ed Sheeran on his ÷ Tour for all three Dunedin dates.

In Summer 2019–2020 James opened for Six60 on their world tour.

=== 2024–2025: Retirement and This is Not What I Had in Mind ===
In April 2024, James released "Bird in a Hurricane". This is his first single on Six60's label Massive.

In September 2024, James published an open letter to his fans stating he would be "taking an extended break from music" following the release of his third studio album in May 2025, aptly titled This is Not What I Had in Mind. In media interviews following his announcement, James described becoming disillusioned with the music industry, and previous experiences trying to appease his previous record label had left him questioning his talent and integrity.

James performed a final time at Homegrown in March 2025, and held his last concert, The Final Show, in the Christchurch Town Hall on 24 May 2025.

== Discography ==
=== Albums ===
Title	Details	Peak chart positions	Certifications
Title	Details	NZ	Certifications
Mitch James	Released: 14 September 2018; Label: Sony Music NZ; Formats: CD, digital download, streaming	2	RMNZ: Platinum
Patience	Released: 4 November 2022; Label: Sony Music Australia; Formats: CD, digital download, streaming	13	
This is Not What I Had in Mind	Released: 16 May 2025; Label: Massive Records; Formats: Digital download, streaming		

=== Extended plays ===
Title	Details
Sunday Sessions	Released: 7 August 2020; Label: Sony Music Australia; Formats: CD, digital download

=== Singles ===
Title	Year	Peak chart positions	Certifications	Album
Title	Year	NZ	Certifications	Album
"Move On"	2016	—	RMNZ: Gold	Mitch James
"All the Ways to Say Goodbye"	2017	—		Mitch James
"21"	2018	—	RMNZ: Platinum	Mitch James
"Old News"	2018	—	RMNZ: Platinum	Mitch James
"Bright Blue Skies"	2019	—	RMNZ: Platinum	Mitch James
"Sunday Morning"	2019	37	RMNZ: Platinum	Non-album singles
"Be Somebody"	2021	— (Note: "Be Somebody" did not enter the NZ Top 40 Singles Chart, but peaked at number five on the NZ Hot Singles Chart.)		Non-album singles
"History"	2022	— (Note: "History" did not enter the NZ Top 40 Singles Chart, but peaked at number one on the NZ Hot Singles Chart.)		Non-album singles
"Motions"	2022	— (Note: "Patience" did not enter the NZ Top 40 Singles Chart, but peaked at number four on the NZ Hot Singles Chart.)		Patience
"Stuck in Denial"	2022	— (Note: "Stuck in Denial" did not enter the NZ Top 40 Singles Chart, but peaked at number nine on the NZ Hot Singles Chart.)		Patience
"Home Is Lonely"	2022	— (Note: "Home Is Lonely" did not enter the NZ Top 40 Singles Chart, but peaked at number 38 on the NZ Hot Singles Chart.)		Patience
"Bird in a Hurricane"	2024	— (Note: "Bird in a Hurricane" did not enter the NZ Top 40 Singles Chart, but peaked at number 34 on the NZ Hot Singles Chart.)		This is Not What I Had in Mind
"Mumma and Me"	2024	— (Note: "Mumma and Me" did not enter the NZ Top 40 Singles Chart, but peaked at number 34 on the NZ Hot Singles Chart.)		This is Not What I Had in Mind
"Beautiful Stranger"	2024	— (Note: "Beautiful Stranger" did not enter the NZ Top 40 Singles Chart, but peaked at number 34 on the NZ Hot Singles Chart.)		This is Not What I Had in Mind

== Awards and nominations ==
Year	Nominee/Work	Award	Result
2018	Mitch James	MTV Europe Music Award for Best New Zealand Act	Won
2018	21	Vodafone New Zealand Music Awards for Single of the Year	Nominated
2017	Mitch James	Vodafone New Zealand Music Awards for Best Pop Act	Nominated
2019	Mitch James	2019 VAC Benny Awards : Top Male Artist	Won

== Tours ==
- Humble Roadie Tour (2017)
- NZ and Australia Album Tour (2018)
- ÷ Tour with Ed Sheeran (2018)
- Bright Blue Skies UK and NZ Tour (2019)
- Drax Project and Mitch James Tour (2021)
- Bridges World Tour w/ Calum Scott (2022)
- The Long Road Home World Tour (2023)
- The Final Show (2025)
