= Do It Again (Benee song) =

2023 single by Benee featuring Mallrat

Single by Benee featuring Mallrat
- Released: 28 June 2023
- Length: 2:56
- Label: Republic
- Songwriters: Stella Bennett; Grace Shaw; Josh Fountain; Tiare Kelly; Timon Martin
- Producers: Fountain; Martin

Benee singles chronology
"Bagels" (2023)	"Do It Again" (2023)

Music video
- "Do It Again" on YouTube

"Do It Again" (stylised in all caps) is a song by New Zealand singer Benee featuring Australian singer Mallrat, released through Republic Records on 28 June 2023, as a standalone single and the official song of the 2023 FIFA Women's World Cup. Primarily written by Benee and Mallrat alongside Joshua Fountain, Tiare Kelly, and Timon Martin, "Do It Again" was produced by Fountain and Martin.

"Do It Again" peaked at number 30 on the New Zealand Hot Singles Chart.

== Background ==
Speaking about the song to Stereogum, Benee spoke about the song's conception, saying:

Being a small part of this incredible celebration of women's sport is an absolute dream come true for me. As a keen young football player, I just couldn’t have imagined this! I've loved the experience of writing a song which I hope reflects my excitement at having the world's biggest women's sports event held on my home turf, and I can’t wait to perform "Do It Again" live with Mallrat at the opening ceremony."

Benee and Mallrat had previously collaborated on "Winter" in 2020, from the former's debut album, Hey U X. The pair, hailing from both hosting countries—Australia and New Zealand—performed the song at the opening ceremony at Auckland's Eden Park, on 20 July 2023.

== Critical reception ==
Megan Armstrong of Uproxx called the track an "empowered, pulsating anthem [and a] guaranteed summer earworm, [sic] even outside of its World Cup placement". FIFA dubbed the song a "vibrant and infectious anthem that promises to captivate fans".

== Personnel ==
Adapted from Spotify.

=== Performers ===
- Benee – vocals
- Mallrat – background vocals
- Josh Fountain – drum, programming, guitar, synthesiser
- Timon Martin – background vocalist, bass guitar, synthesiser
- Tiare Kelly – background vocalist, bass guitar

=== Writing and arrangement ===
- Josh Fountain – composer, lyricist
- Timon Martin – composer, lyricist
- Tiare Kelly – composer, lyricist
- Stella Rose Bennett – composer, lyricist
- Grace Shaw – composer, lyricist

=== Production and engineering ===
- Josh Fountain – producer, studio personnel, recording engineer
- Timon Martin – producer
- Neal Avron – studio personnel, mixer
- Idania Valencia – studio personnel, mastering engineer

== Charts ==
Chart performance for "Do It Again"
Chart (2023)	Peak position
New Zealand Hot Singles (RMNZ)	30
