= Glitter (Benee song) =

2019 single by Benee

Single by Benee

from the EP Fire on Marzz
- Released: 3 July 2019
- Length: 3:00
- Label: Republic
- Songwriters: Stella Bennett; Joshua Fountain; Djeisan Suskov
- Producers: Fountain; Suskov

Benee singles chronology
"Want Me Back" (2019)	"Glitter" (2019)	"Find an Island" (2019)

Music video
- "Glitter" on YouTube

"Glitter" is a song by New Zealand singer Benee. It was released as a single on 3 July 2019 as the fourth and final single from Benee's debut extended play Fire on Marzz. The song peaked at number 7 on the New Zealand Singles Chart, was certified gold, and went viral on TikTok in November 2019.

== Critical reception ==
In an album review, George Fenwick from The New Zealand Herald called the song "A joyous track that swells and shines like an adolescent crush. Djeisan Suskov's twangy guitars gleam as bright as the title suggests, as Benee simply asks someone to hang out with her."

Alison Gallagher from Music Feeds called the song "a hazy, reverb-soaked yet deceptively energetic bop."

== Charts ==
=== Weekly charts ===
Weekly chart performance for "Glitter"
Chart (2019–2020)	Peak position
Australia (ARIA)	20
New Zealand (Recorded Music NZ)	3
US Hot Rock & Alternative Songs (Billboard)	40

=== Year-end charts ===
2020 year-end chart performance for "Glitter"
Chart (2020)	Position
Australia (ARIA)	49
New Zealand (Recorded Music NZ)	7

== Certifications ==
Region	Certification	Certified units/sales
Australia (ARIA)	4× Platinum	280,000^{‡}
Brazil (Pro-Música Brasil)	Gold	20,000^{‡}
New Zealand (RMNZ)	6× Platinum	180,000^{‡}
^{‡} Sales+streaming figures based on certification alone.
