= Ur an Angel I'm Just Particles =

Studio album by Benee
- Released: 7 November 2025
- Recorded: 2022–2025
- Length: 34:51
- Label: Republic
- Producer: Elvira Anderfjärd; Wyatt Bernard; Leroy Clampitt; Matt Cohn; Austin Corona; Josh Fountain; John Hill; Luka Kloser; Ryan Raines; Sly; Mike Wise

Benee chronology
Lychee (2022)	Ur an Angel I'm Just Particles (2025)

Singles from Ur an Angel I'm Just Particles
- 1. "Sad Boiii" Released: 5 September 2024; 2. "Animal" Released: 14 November 2024; 3. "Off the Rails" Released: 20 June 2025; 4. "Cinnamon" Released: 27 August 2025; 5. "Underwater" Released: 3 October 2025

Ur an Angel I'm Just Particles is the second studio album by New Zealand singer-songwriter Benee. It was released on 7 November 2025 via Republic Records, as her first studio album in five years, following Hey U X (2020), and her first project overall in overall in over three years, following the extended play Lychee (2022). The album was supported by five singles: "Sad Boiii", "Animal", "Off the Rails", "Cinnamon" and "Underwater".

== Background and recording ==
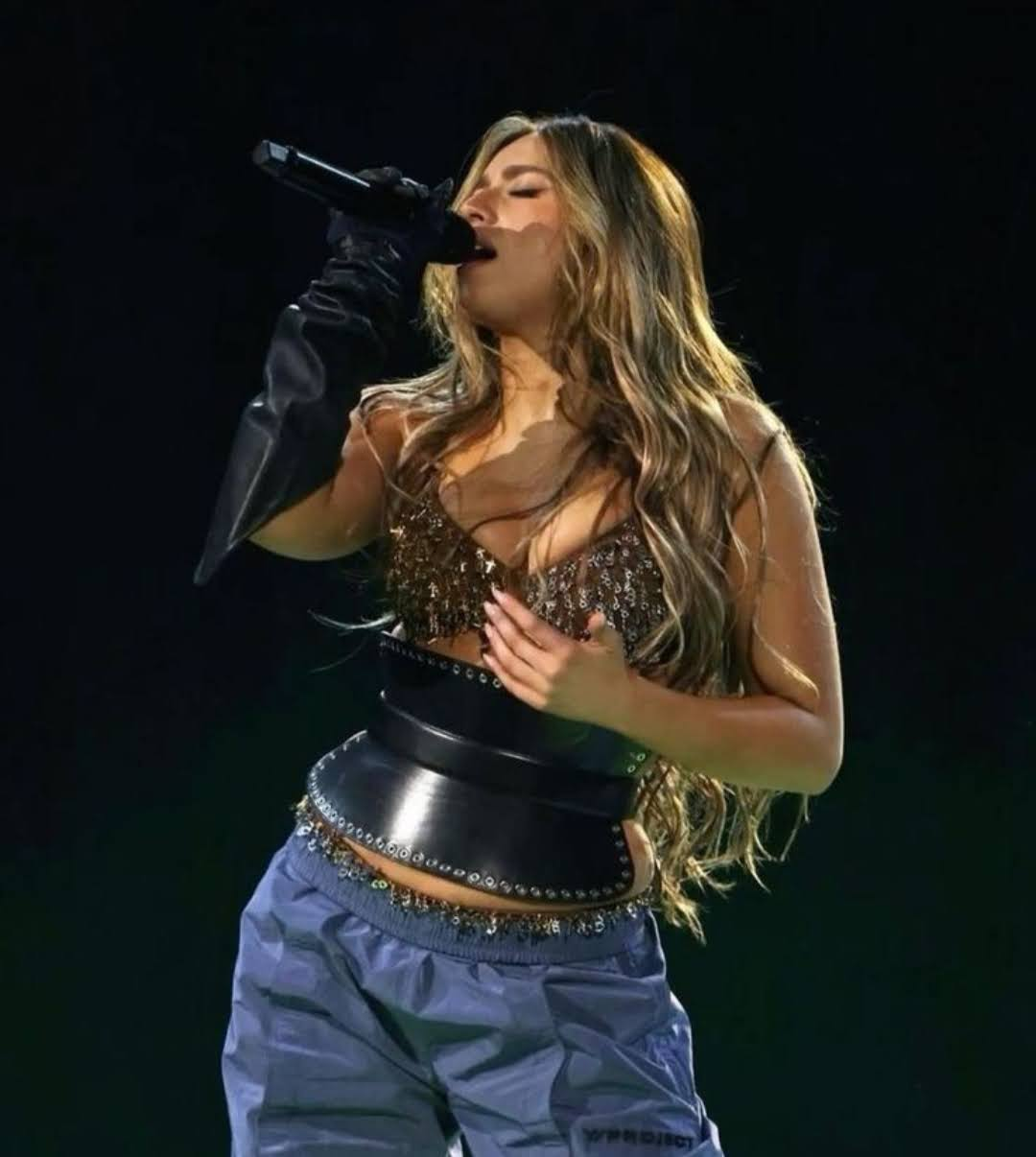
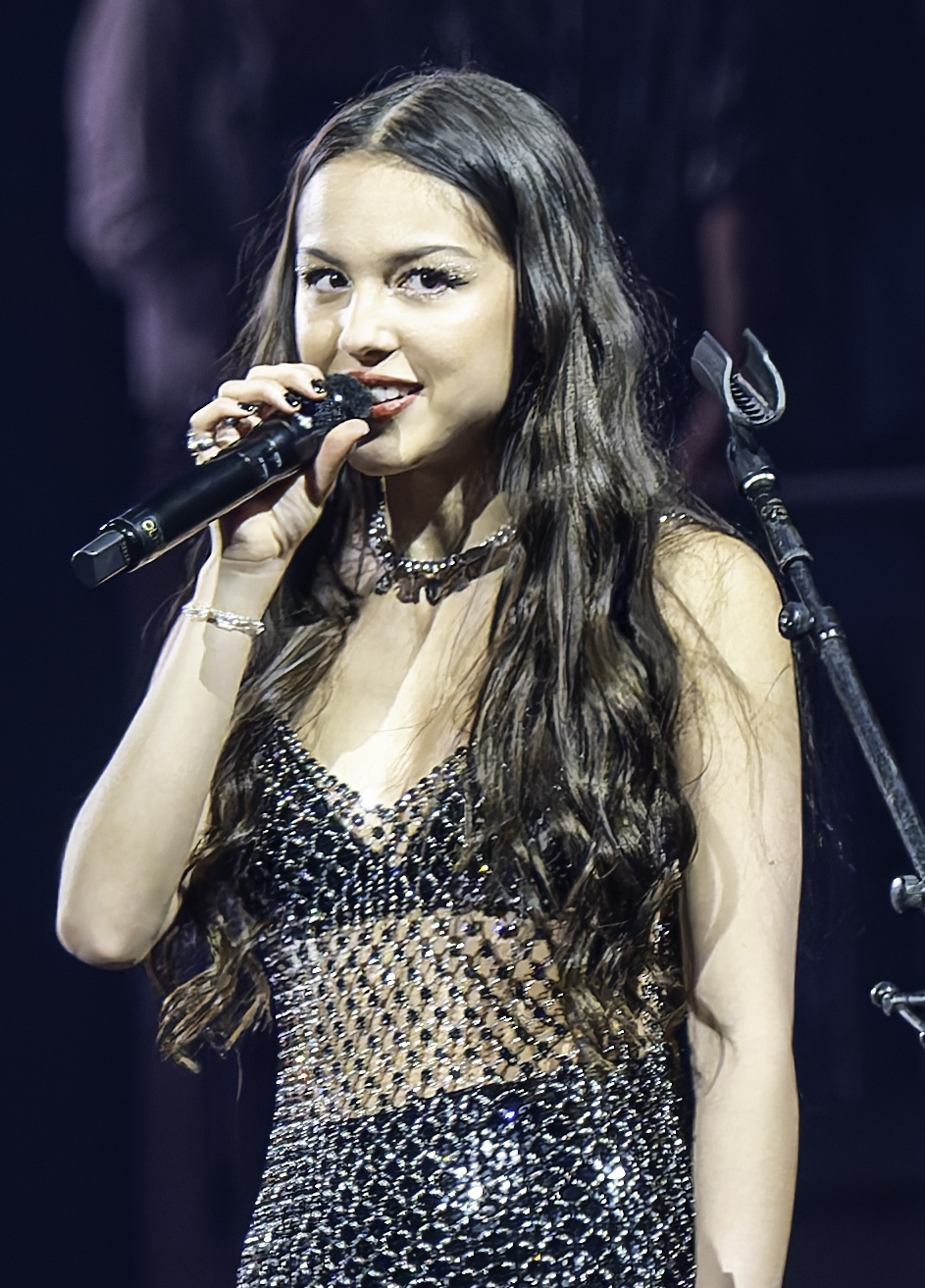
Tate McRae (left) and Olivia Rodrigo (right), whose tours Benee supported during the writing and recording period.

Benee announced her second studio album, Ur An Angel I'm Just Particles, set for release on 7 November 2025 through Republic Records. It was written and recorded over a three-year period, during which she continued to release new music and tour with artists including Tate McRae, Olivia Rodrigo, Conan Gray and Wallows. Described by Benee as a clear and personal story, the album reflects her move to Los Angeles and the challenges of navigating a new environment. Expanding on this, she explained that she wanted listeners "to enter another world", calling the album her most "intentional" and "cohesive" work to date. She further described it as a narrative project that follows "themes of obsession, breakdown, chaos and ascent — in that order", emphasizing "that's the story, and those are the changes", adding that her early years in Los Angeles left her "lost and confused and overwhelmed". A book by Stephen Hawking became a turning point, as it helped her to shift perspective and focus on what felt "important and helpful in this climate", which ultimately inspired her to craft a "fantastical world" for listeners to escape into.

== Release and promotion ==
=== Singles ===
The album's lead single, "Sad Boiii", was released in 2024, marking Benee's return after a brief hiatus. It was noted for its summer-inspired production and introspective lyrics. The second single, "Animal", was released on 14 November alongside a music video directed by Keith Herron and filmed in Sydney. Written during a tour, the song was inspired by feelings of existential dread and the perspective of viewing the world from an airplane. "Off the Rails", co-written by Luka Kloser and Elvira Anderfjärd, was released as the third single of the album, on 20 June 2025. "Cinnamon" was released on 27 August as the fourth single from the album. Its music video was directed by Keith Herron. On October 3, "Underwater" was released as the fifth and final single.

=== Tour ===
Benee announced a release party for the album on 2 October 2025, which happened on November 7 in Los Angeles at the Masonic Lodge at Hollywood Forever. On 7 October, she revealed that she would be headlining three shows in Australia as well as in Laneway Festival sideshows. The singer also announced a North American tour, the Particles Tour, on 10 November, visiting the United States and Canada throughout 23 dates beginning on 27 February 2026 and concluding on 3 April.

== Critical reception ==
Professional ratings
Review scores
Source	Rating
Clash	7/10
Dork	3/5

Upon release, reviewers discussed the album in the context of Benee's station as a "wonderful and weird" artist in the pop music scene; Felicity Newton of Dork wrote that the artist remained "one of pop's most relatable oddballs". Several critics acclaimed the artist's confidence and sharpened intentions,. with Zahra Hanif from Clash citing "more conviction" in the exploration of themes related to love and relationships, helped by its experimental and eclectic production. Newton called the album "tidy, confident, [and] occasionally too polite for its own good". Newton also noted while the record lacks a "Supalonely"-level breakout moment, Benee's ability to blend "melancholy with mischief" remains intact.

== Track listing ==
Ur An Angel I'm Just Particles track listing
No.	Title	Writer(s)	Producer(s)	Length
1.	"Demons"	Stella Bennett; Matt Castellanos; Mike Wise	Wise; Ryan Raines	2:38
2.	"Cinnamon"	Bennett; Ryan Raines	Raines	2:42
3.	"Vegas"	Bennett; Castellanos; Matt Cohn; John Hill	Cohn; Hill	2:57
4.	"Sad Boiii"	Bennett; Leroy Clampitt	Clampitt; Spencer Zahn^{[a]}	2:46
5.	"Prey4U"	Bennett; Wyatt Bernard; Castellanos; Austin Corona	Wise; Bernard; Corona	3:05
6.	"Chainmail"	Bennett; Clampitt; Leland; Sam Preston; Sylvester Sivertsen	Clampitt^{[p]}; Sly^{[p]}	2:46
7.	"Doomsday"	Bennett; Felix Holton; Jackson LaFrantz; Raines; Wise	Wise; Raines; Holton^{[a]}; LaFrantz^{[a]}; Josh Fountain^{[a]}	2:32
8.	"Underwater"	Bennett; Pablo Bowman; Castellanos; Cohn	Wise; Cohn	3:34
9.	"Off the Rails"	Bennett; Elvira Anderfjärd; Luka Kloser	Anderfjärd; Kloser; Fountain	1:47
10.	"Animal"	Bennett; Wise; Madi Yanofsky	Wise	2:48
11.	"Princess"	Bennett; Clampitt; PinkPantheress; Sivertsen	Clampitt^{[p]}; Sly^{[p]}	2:49
12.	"Heaven"	Bennett; Josh Fountain; Timon Martin	Fountain; Martin; Zahn^{[a]}; Benee^{[s]}	4:27
Total length:				34:51

=== Notes ===
- ^{^[p]} indicates a primary and vocal producer.
- ^{^[a]} indicates an additional producer.
- ^{^[s]} indicates a strings producer.

== Personnel ==
Credits were adapted from Tidal.

=== Musicians ===
- Benee – vocals
- Ryan Raines – drums (tracks 1, 2, 7); bass, guitar, keyboards (2, 7); percussion (7)
- Mike Wise – keyboards (1, 5, 7, 8, 10); bass, guitar, percussion (1, 5, 8, 10); drums (1, 5, 8), programming (8), drum programming (10), synthesizer (10)
- Sora Lopez – strings (2)
- John Hill – bass, drums, guitar, programming (3)
- Matt Cohn – guitar, keyboards, programming, synthesizer (3, 8); bass, drums, percussion (8)
- Leroy Clampitt – drum programming, guitar, piano (4); background vocals (6, 11); drums, keyboards (6); bass (11)
- Spencer Zahn – bass (4, 12); piano, synthesizer (4); keyboards (12)
- Mark Rudin – horn arrangement (4)
- Austin Corona – bass, drums, guitar, keyboards, percussion, programming (5)
- Wyatt Bernard – bass, drums, guitar, keyboards, percussion, programming (5)
- Sylvester "Sly" Sivertsen – background vocals, drums, keyboards (6, 11)
- Sam Preston – bass, guitar (6)
- Leland – background vocals (6)
- Felix Holton – drum programming (7, 9), percussion (7)
- Jackson LaFrantz – guitar (7)
- Elvira Anderfjärd – background vocals, bass, drums, keyboards, percussion, programming (9)
- Luka Kloser – background vocals, bass, drums, keyboards, percussion, programming (9)
- Tom Verberne – guitar (9)
- Josh Fountain – guitar (12)
- Timon Martin – guitar (12)

=== Technical ===
- Mike Wise – engineering (1, 5, 10)
- Ryan Raines – engineering (2, 7)
- Drew Bunge – engineering (3)
- Jon Yeston – engineering (3)
- Leroy Clampitt – engineering (4, 6, 11)
- Mark Rudin – engineering (4)
- Austin Corona – engineering (5)
- Wyatt Bernard – engineering (5)
- Sylvester "Sly" Sivertsen – engineering (6, 11)
- Josh Fountain – engineering (7)
- Matt Cohn – engineering (8)
- Elvira Anderfjärd – engineering (9)
- Luka Kloser – engineering (9)
- Lars Stalfors – mixing (1–3, 5–12)
- Mitch McCarthy – mixing (4)
- Hamish Patrick – mixing assistance (1–3, 5–8, 10–12)
- Joe LaPorta – mastering

== Charts ==
Chart performance
Chart (2025)	Peak position
Australian Albums (ARIA)	95
New Zealand Albums (RMNZ)	24
