= Dreamer Boy =

American singer-songwriter

- Born: Zachary Arthur Taylor; February 28, 1996 (age 30); Spokane, Washington, U.S.
- Genres: Bedroom pop; alternative pop; pop
- Occupation: Singer-songwriter
- Instrument: Vocals
- Years active: 2018–present
- Labels: slowplay/Harvest; Universal

Zachary Arthur Taylor (born February 28, 1996), better known by his stage name Dreamer Boy, is an American singer-songwriter. He has released three studio albums Love, Nostalgia (2018), All the Ways We Are Together (2021), and Lonestar (2024).

== Early life and career ==
Taylor is originally from Spokane, Washington and currently based in Nashville, Tennessee. While in Nashville, Taylor went to Belmont University for college. On November 13, 2018, he released his debut album Love, Nostalgia, preceded by the singles "Falling for the Wrong One", "Orange Girl", and "Fever". His second album All the Ways We Are Together was released on April 22, 2021 (Earth Day). The album was promoted by five singles "Know You", "Crybaby", "Don't Be a Fool", "Easier Said Than Done" and "Let's Hold Hands" (featuring Melanie Faye). In 2024, Taylor released his third album Lonestar, supported by three singles "Heartbreaker", "Suckerpunch" and "If You're Not in Love". Since his debut, he has toured along with other artists, such as Still Woozy, The Marías, and Omar Apollo, as well as performed as the opening act for BENEE and Clairo.

== Discography ==
=== Albums ===
Title	Details
Love, Nostalgia	Released: November 13, 2018; Label: Self-released; Format: Digital download, streaming
All the Ways We Are Together	Released: April 22, 2021; Label: snowplay/Harvest, Universal; Format: Digital download, streaming
Lonestar	Released: May 10, 2024; Label: snowplay/Harvest; Format: Digital download, streaming

=== Singles ===
Title	Year	Peak chart positions	Album
Title	Year	NZ Hot	Album
"Stargaze (Demo)"	2018	—	Non-album single
"Falling for the Wrong One"	2018	—	Love, Nostalgia
"Orange Girl"	2018	—	Love, Nostalgia
"Fever"	2018	—	Love, Nostalgia
"Puppy Dog"	2019	—	Non-album single
"Know You"	2020	—	All the Ways We Are Together
"Crybaby"	2020	—	All the Ways We Are Together
"Don't Be a Fool"	2020	—	All the Ways We Are Together
"Easier Said Than Done"	2021	—	All the Ways We Are Together
"Let’s Hold Hands" (featuring Melanie Faye)	2021	—	All the Ways We Are Together
"Keep the Pace"	2021	—	Non-album singles
"Are You Letting Go?" (featuring BENEE)	2021	34	Non-album singles
"Over Everything"	2022	—	Non-album singles
"Jumpshot"	2022	—	Non-album singles
"Hues"	2022	—	Non-album singles
"Heartbreaker"	2024	—	Lonestar
"Suckerpunch"	2024	—	Lonestar
"If You're Not In Love"	2024	—	Lonestar

=== Promotional singles ===
Title	Year	Album
"Dreamer - Level Live 003"	2019	Non-album single
