= Soaked =

2018 single by Benee

Single by Benee

from the EP Fire on Marzz
- Released: 14 September 2018
- Studio: Golden Age, Morningside, Auckland
- Genre: Pop; alternative pop
- Length: 4:01
- Label: Republic
- Songwriters: Stella Bennett; Joshua Fountain; Djeisan Suskov
- Producers: Fountain; Suskov

Benee singles chronology
"Tough Guy" (2017)	"Soaked" (2018)	"Evil Spider" (2019)

Music video
- "Soaked" on YouTube

"Soaked" is a song by New Zealand singer Benee. It was released as a single on 14 September 2018 as the lead single from Benee's debut extended play Fire on Marzz. The song was released on Spotify, received airplay on New Zealand radio, and reached number 58 on the Triple J Hottest 100, 2018.

== Background ==
In a press release, the song was described as "indie-slack fun with a little R'n'B swing". In 2019, Benee re-recorded the song in Te Reo Māori for Waiata / Anthems, a collection of re-recorded New Zealand pop songs to promote te Wiki o te Reo Māori (Māori Language Week). The new version, retitled "Kua Kore He Kupu / Soaked", featured lyrics reinterpreted by scholar Tīmoti Kāretu. This version reached number five on the New Zealand artists' singles chart.

== Critical reception ==
"Soaked" was called a "slick, funk-fuelled pop number" by Pilerats, while The Music Network described it as "an R'n'B drenched slice of alt-pop that accentuates the young singer's soulful vocals".

== Charts ==
=== Weekly charts ===
Chart (2019)	Peak position
New Zealand (Recorded Music NZ)	14

=== Year-end charts ===
Chart (2019)	Position
New Zealand (Recorded Music NZ)	26

== Certifications ==
Region	Certification	Certified units/sales
Australia (ARIA)	2× Platinum	140,000^{‡}
New Zealand (RMNZ)	4× Platinum	120,000^{‡}
^{‡} Sales+streaming figures based on certification alone.
