= Mitch James (album) =

Studio album by Mitch James
- Released: 14 September 2018
- Genre: Pop
- Label: Sony Music Entertainment New Zealand

Singles from Mitch James
- 1. "No Fixed Abode" Released: 2 December 2016; 2. "All the Ways to Say Goodbye" Released: 28 July 2017; 3. "21" Released: 18 May 2018; 4. "Old News" Released: 2018; 5. "Bright Blue Skies" Released: 2019

Mitch James is the debut studio album by New Zealand singer-songwriter Mitch James. It was released on 14 September 2018.

== Track listing ==
Deluxe edition
No.	Title	Writer(s)	Length
1.	"21"	Mitch James, Mike Waters	3:21
2.	"Old News"	James, David Zanden, Cassandra Stromberg, Joel Erikkson	3:50
3.	"Can't Help Myself"	James, Waters, Robby De Sa	3:30
4.	"Bright Blue Skies"	James, Waters	3:02
5.	"Apologise"	James, Waters	3:54
6.	"No Getting Older"	James, Anthony Egizii, David Musumeci	3:51
7.	"One More"	James	4:16
8.	"It Ain't Helping"	James, Ji Fraser, Eli Paewai, Matiu Walters	3:52
9.	"Lay It on the Line"	James, Egizii, Musumeci	3:05
10.	"Got Today"	James, Michael Fatkin	3:22
11.	"No Fixed Abode"	James	3:24
12.	"All the Ways to Say Goodbye"	James, Emily Warren, Sam de Jong, Nik Brinkman	3:05
13.	"Move On"	James, De Jong, Dave Baxter	3:00
14.	"Saving Time"	James	2:50

== Charts and certifications ==
=== Charts ===
Chart (2018)	Peak position
New Zealand Albums Chart	2

=== Certifications ===
Region	Certification	Sales/shipments
New Zealand (RMNZ)	Gold	7,500^
^shipments figures based on certification alone
