= Tingsryd Municipality =

Tingsryd Municipality Tingsryds kommun
- Municipality
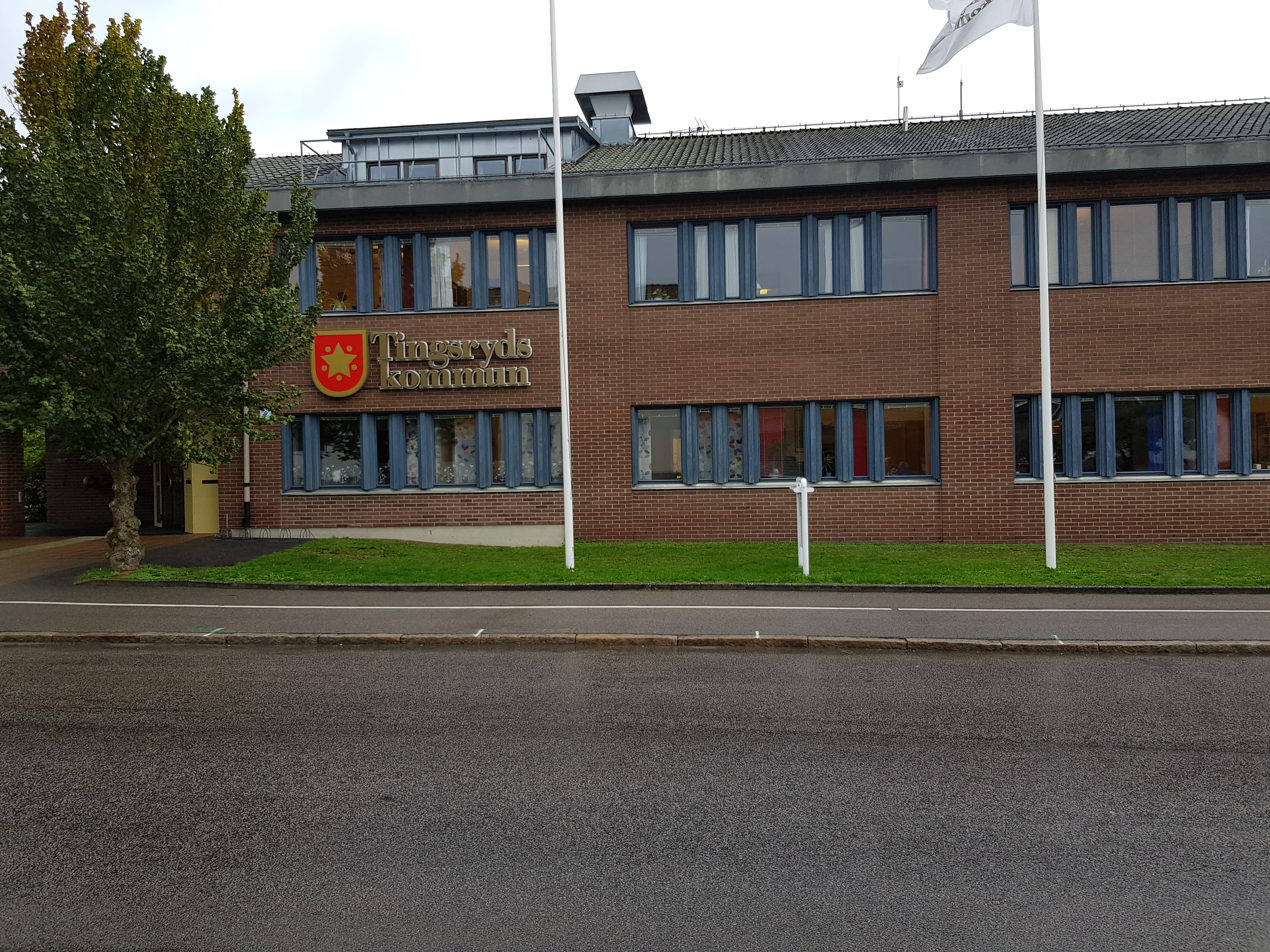
- Tingsryd Town Hall

- Coat of arms

- Coordinates: 56°32′N 14°59′E
- Country: Sweden
- County: Kronoberg County
- Seat: Tingsryd

Area
  - Total: 1,207.24 km^{2} (466.12 sq mi)
  - Land: 1,044.88 km^{2} (403.43 sq mi)
  - Water: 162.36 km^{2} (62.69 sq mi)
- Area as of 1 January 2014.

Population (30 June 2025)
  - Total: 11,966
  - Density: 11.452/km^{2} (29.661/sq mi)
- Time zone: UTC+1 (CET)
  - Summer (DST): UTC+2 (CEST)
- ISO 3166 code: SE
- Province: Småland
- Municipal code: 0763
- Website: www.tingsryd.se

Tingsryd Municipality (Swedish: Tingsryds kommun) is a municipality in Småland, southern Sweden, in southeastern Kronoberg County, where the town Tingsryd is seat.

The present municipality was formed by the local government reform of 1971 when the market town (köping) Tingsryd (instituted in 1921) was amalgamated with its surrounding entities.

Tingsryd is most famous for its hockey team Tingsryds AIF. The club has delivered several players to the NHL and are currently playing in Hockeyallsvenskan.

Tingsryd Municipality refers to itself as the "Horse Capital" because of a close connection to horses; they are housing nearly 2,000 horses. The new Tingsryd horse racing track (opened 27 July 2003) is the only one in Northern Europe being a mile (1,609 m) long and gathers every kind of equestrian sport.

== Geography ==
Tingsryd Municipality is located in an area of traditional Mid-Sweden forestry, with some agriculture areas, and the geography is also taken up by many small lakes. Much of the population (38% estimated) of the municipality still live in rural areas, the rest live in almost equally populated small towns, without any densely populated central city in the municipality.

The Mien crater, the result of a meteorite impact some 120 million years ago, lies 11 km southwest of Tingsryd. Being sparsely populated, it is regarded as a safe environment far from urban stress.

=== Localities ===
There are 7 urban areas (also called a Tätort or locality) in Tingsryd Municipality.

In the table the localities are listed according to the size of the population as of December 31, 2018. The municipal seat is in bold characters.

#	Locality	Population
1	**Tingsryd**	3,168
2	Ryd	1,468
3	Urshult	984
4	Väckelsång	970
5	Konga	494
6	Linneryd	463
7	Rävemåla	308

== Demographics ==
This is a demographic table based on Tingsryd Municipality's electoral districts in the 2022 Swedish general election sourced from SVT's election platform, in turn taken from SCB official statistics.

In total there were 12,299 residents, including 9,188 Swedish citizens of voting age. 40.0% voted for the left coalition and 58.7% for the right coalition. Indicators are in percentage points except population totals and income.

Location	Residents	Citizen adults	Left vote	Right vote	Employed	Swedish parents	Foreign heritage	Income SEK	Degree
Location			%	%					
Almundsryd	2,177	1,642	35.6	63.2	75	76	24	21,766	22
S Sandsjö	1,088	757	39.2	59.6	77	77	23	22,248	30
Tingsryd 1	1,588	1,161	43.2	55.4	73	72	28	23,276	26
Tingsryd 2	2,093	1,648	41.6	57.1	85	84	16	23,648	27
Urshult	1,857	1,358	44.2	54.9	78	81	19	22,293	30
Väckelsång	1,591	1,194	41.8	57.1	83	88	12	24,703	31
Älmeboda	1,905	1,428	36.1	62.0	82	86	14	23,270	29
Source: SVT

== Sights ==
In the forest near the town of Ryd there is a remotely located car cemetery with cars from 1930–1960. It is visited by some 1,000 people interested in curiosities every year.
