= Beach Boy (Benee song) =

2022 single by Benee

Single by Benee

from the EP Lychee
- Released: 3 February 2022
- Length: 3:12
- Label: Republic
- Songwriters: Stella Bennett; Greg Kurstin
- Producer: Greg Kurstin

Benee singles chronology
"Doesn't Matter" (2021)	"Beach Boy" (2022)	"Uh Oh!" (2022)

Music video
- "Beach Boy" on YouTube

"Beach Boy" is a song by New Zealand singer Benee. It was released through Republic Records on 3 February 2022, as the second single from her third EP, Lychee. The song peaked at number 7 on the New Zealand Hot Singles Chart.

== Background ==
Speaking about the song to Stereogum, Benee said: "It’s about being happy alone, but still wanting some love; wanting the thrill without the pain. It was the first time I’d worked with Greg Kurstin, and it was so sick...we got on super well, and I love this track...I think it is perfect for cruising down the freeway with the top down." In an interview with Rolling Stone Australia, Benee also said:

I was a huge Twilight fan growing up, and I wanted to have my own true vampire moment! I wanted this one to be upbeat and cheeky to match my lyrics, hehe.

== Critical reception ==
Erica Campbell of NME called the track a "dreamy, summer-infused love song," and Robin Murray of Clash said the track was a "breezy return."

== Charts ==
Chart (2022)	Position
New Zealand Hot Singles (RMNZ)	7
