= Malou Prytz =

Swedish singer (born 2003)

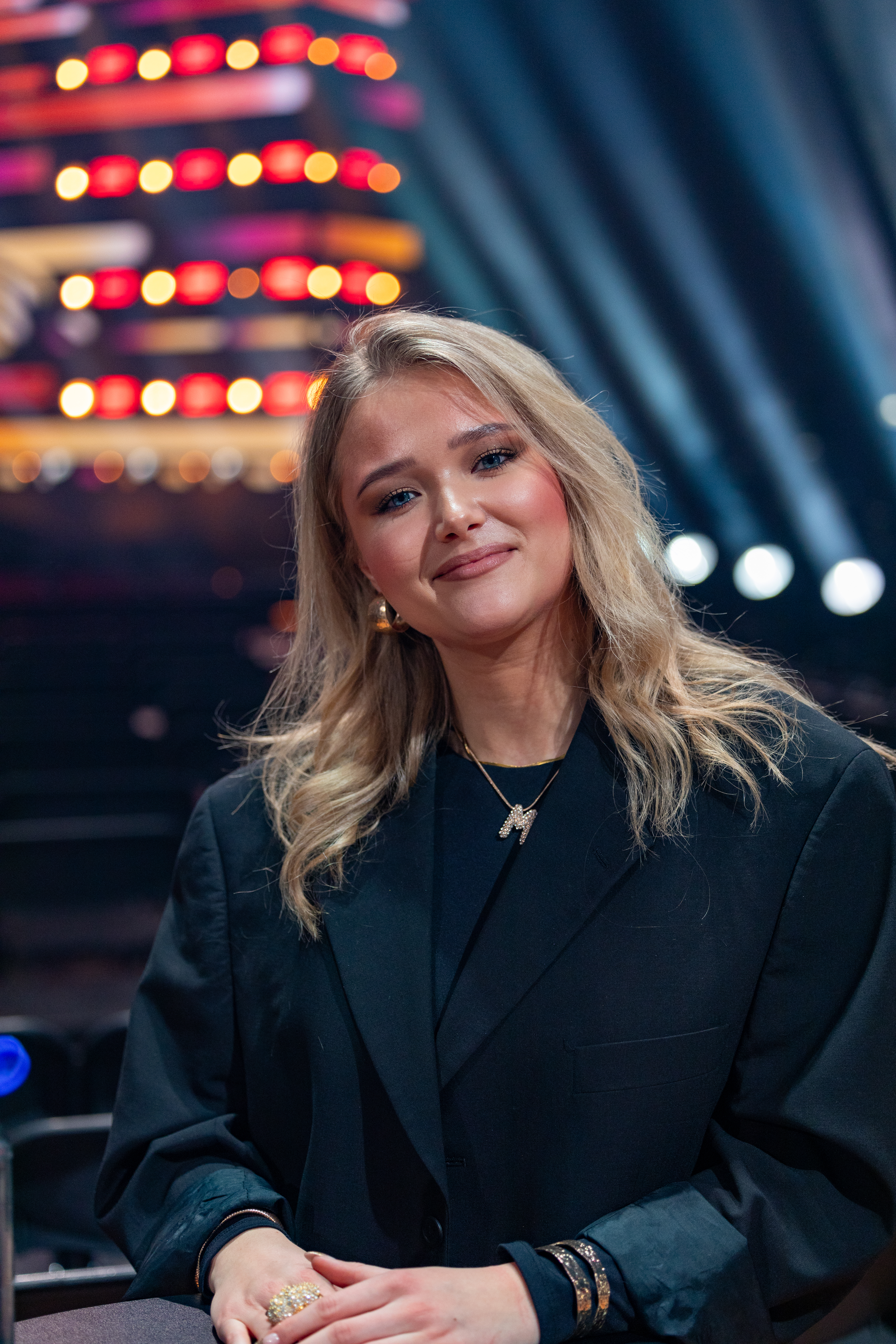
- Malou Prytz (2025)

Background information
- Born: Malou Trasthe Prytz; 6 March 2003 (age 22); Ryd, Sweden
- Occupation: Singer
- Years active: 2018–present

Malou Trasthe Prytz (born 6 March 2003) is a Swedish singer. She competed in Melodifestivalen 2019 with the song "I Do Me" in the second semi-final, qualifying to the final. She also competed in Melodifestivalen 2025 and performed in the third heat with the song "24k gold" where she failed to qualify any further. She resides in Ryd, Småland, Sweden.

Malou Prytz tells about herself.

== Discography ==
=== Extended plays ===
Title	Details
Enter	Released: 28 June 2019; Label: Warner Music Sweden; Format: Digital download, streaming

=== Singles ===
Title	Year	Peak chart positions	Album
Title	Year	SWE	Album
"I Do Me"	2019	10	Enter
"Left & Right"	2019	—	Enter
"If It Ain't Love"	2019	—	TBA
"Ballerina"	2020	40	TBA
"Do" (with Millé and Glockenbach)	2020	—	TBA
"Tik Tok"	2020	—	TBA
"Echo"	2021	—	TBA
"Wishlist"	2021	—	TBA
"Bananas"	2022	51	TBA
"Red Flags"	2024	—	TBA
"24K Gold"	2025	25	TBA
"It Must Have Been Love"	2025	—	TBA

=== Featured singles ===
Title	Year
"All Good" (Millé featuring Malou Prytz)	2019
