= Animal (Benee song) =

2024 single by Benee

Single by Benee

from the album Ur an Angel I'm Just Particles
- Released: 14 November 2024
- Length: 2:48
- Label: Republic
- Songwriters: Stella Bennett; Mike Wise; Madi Yanofsky
- Producer: Mike Wise

Benee singles chronology
"Sad Boiii" (2024)	"Animal" (2024)	"Off the Rails" (2025)

Music video
- "Animal" on YouTube

"Animal" is a song by New Zealand singer Benee. It was released through Republic Records on 14 November 2024, as the second single from her second studio album, Ur an Angel I'm Just Particles. The song peaked at number 6 on the Hot 20 Aotearoa Singles Chart.

== Background ==
Speaking about the song to Rolling Stone Australia, Benee said: "When flying in a plane on tour, looking down onto what looks like an ant-like world really inspired the lyrics... How huge something feels when you’re in it, but zoomed out so small. I love thinking about life like that."

== Critical reception ==
Rachel Brodsky of Stereogum called the track "upbeat and anthemic" and said it "has a clear hip-hop influence, with a glitchy backing track".

== Charts ==
Chart (2023)	Position
New Zealand Artist Hot Singles (RMNZ)	6
