= Fire on Marzz =

EP by Benee
- Released: 28 June 2019
- Genre: Pop
- Length: 20:58
- Label: Republic
- Producers: Joshua Fountain (Note: All tracks); Djeisan Suskov (Note: Tracks 1, 2, 4 & 5)

Benee chronology
Fire on Marzz (2019)	Stella & Steve (2019)

Singles from Fire on Marzz
- 1. "Soaked" Released: 14 September 2018; 2. "Evil Spider" Released: 10 May 2019; 3. "Want Me Back" Released: 14 June 2019; 4. "Glitter" Released: 3 July 2019

Fire on Marzz (stylized in all caps) is the debut extended play by New Zealand singer-songwriter Benee, released on 28 June 2019 through Republic Records.

Supported by four singles—"Soaked", "Evil Spider", "Want Me Back", and "Glitter"—Fire on Marzz achieved minor critical and commercial success, peaking at number 13 on the New Zealand Albums Chart and number 75 on the ARIA Albums Chart. Fire on Marzz additionally won Benee the award for Best Solo Artist at the 2019 New Zealand Music Awards.

== Promotion ==
Fire on Marzz was preceded by four singles.

"Soaked" was released on 14 September 2018.

"Evil Spider" was released on 10 May 2019 as the EP's second single.

"Want Me Back" was released on 14 June 2019 as the EP's third single.

"Glitter" was released on 3 July 2019 as the EP's fourth and final single.

== Critical reception ==
Professional ratings
Review scores
Source	Rating
The New Zealand Herald	4.5/5 stars

George Fenwick from The New Zealand Herald wrote: "Benee is a wise and perceptive songwriter with the pipes to match. She's able to flex her versatility across just six songs, and displays a crafty ability to think of her art outside the boundaries of its own format. With Fire on Marzz, Benee is here to set New Zealand pop music ablaze".

== Awards and nominations ==
New Zealand Music Awards:

List of awards and nominations, including year, nominated work, awards, result, and reference
Year	Nominee / work	Award	Result	Ref.
2019	Fire on Marzz	Best Solo Artist	Won	

== Track listing ==
No.	Title	Writer(s)	Producer(s)	Length
1.	"Soaked"	Stella Rose Bennett; Joshua Fountain	Fountain; Djeisan Suskov	4:00
2.	"Glitter"	Bennett; Fountain; Jason Schoushkoff	Fountain; Suskov	3:00
3.	"Wishful Thinking"	Bennett; Fountain	Fountain	3:33
4.	"Afterlife"	Bennett; Fountain; Schoushkoff	Fountain; Suskov	3:56
5.	"Evil Spider"	Bennett; Fountain; Schoushkoff	Fountain; Suskov	2:33
6.	"Want Me Back"	Bennett; Fountain	Fountain	3:54
Total length:				20:58

== Personnel ==
Adapted from the Fire on Marzz / Stella & Steve compilation album's liner notes.

=== Musicians ===
- Stella Rose Bennett – writing, vocals (1–6)

Other musicians

- Josh Fountain – writing (1–6)
- Djeisan Suskov – writing (1)
- Jason Schoushkoff – writing (2, 4, 5)

=== Technical ===
- Josh Fountain – production (1–6), mixing (1)
- David Wrench – mixing (2–5)
- Joe LaPorta – mastering (1–6)

== Charts ==
=== Weekly charts ===
Weekly chart performance for Fire on Marzz
Chart (2019)	Peak position
Australian Albums (ARIA)	75
New Zealand Albums (RMNZ)	13

=== Year-end charts ===
2019 year-end chart performance for Fire on Marzz
Chart (2019)	Position
New Zealand Artist (Recorded Music NZ)	25

2020 year-end chart performance for Fire on Marzz
Chart (2020)	Position
New Zealand Albums (Recorded Music NZ)	24

== Certifications ==
Region	Certification	Certified units/sales
New Zealand (RMNZ)	Platinum	15,000^{‡}
^{‡} Sales+streaming figures based on certification alone.

== Release history ==
Release history and formats for Fire on Marzz
Region	Date	Format	Label	Ref.
Various	28 June 2019	Digital download; streaming	Republic	
