= Green Honda =

2023 single by Benee

Single by Benee
- Released: 8 February 2023
- Length: 2:46
- Label: Republic
- Songwriters: Stella Bennett; Elvira Anderfjärd; Luka Kloser
- Producers: Anderfjärd; Kloser

Benee singles chronology
"Fun Out of It" (2022)	"Green Honda" (2023)	"Lots of Nothing" (2023)

Music video
- "Green Honda" on YouTube

"Green Honda" is a song by New Zealand musician Benee. It was released as a single on 8 February 2023. The song peaked at number 8 on the New Zealand Hot Singles Chart and also peaked at number 14 on the New Zealand Artist Singles Chart, as well as placing 39th on the triple j Hottest 100 list in 2023.

Speaking about the song to Rolling Stone Australia, Benee said the song was "about knowing where you’re at, and what you need to say, and not being afraid." The title of the song describes a car that Benee did once have, a green 2000 model Honda Integra, which features on the cover of her 2019 EP, Stella & Steve, that was passed down to her from her grandmother.

== Background ==
In an interview with DMY Magazine, Benee spoke about the background of the song and said:

I wrote it in April of last year. I wrote it in LA and I worked with two producers called Elvria and Luka, who work out of Max Martin’s studio. Marilyn Monroe used to live there! And Frank Sinatra! There's a lot of history behind it. It was my first time working with them and the first session I’ve ever done with two women! That definitely changed the vibe of it. I felt a lot more confident. Normally, you’re in a session with an old guy, which is awesome because they’re all super talented, but it was nice to be able to relate to them more. I instantly started singing the hook. I was like, "I pull up in my green Honda!" I did that along to the synth bass that they had already put down. We kind of laughed about it and then we all looked at each other like, "Oh! This could work! This could be a really fun song!

== Critical reception ==
Chris Deville of Stereogum called the track a "joyously snarling shit-talk extravaganza" and James Mellen of Clash described the song as a "synthesiser fuelled dance-pop ride" and that the production is "heavy, emblazoned with crushed percussion and fizzy synths, smatterings of vocal chops bouncing between the speakers".

== Charts ==
=== Weekly charts ===
Chart (2023)	Position
New Zealand Hot Singles (RMNZ)	4
New Zealand Artist Singles (RMNZ)	14

=== Year-end lists ===
Publisher	Listicle	Result	Ref.
Triple J	"Hottest 100"	39th	
