= Benee =

New Zealand singer (born 2000)

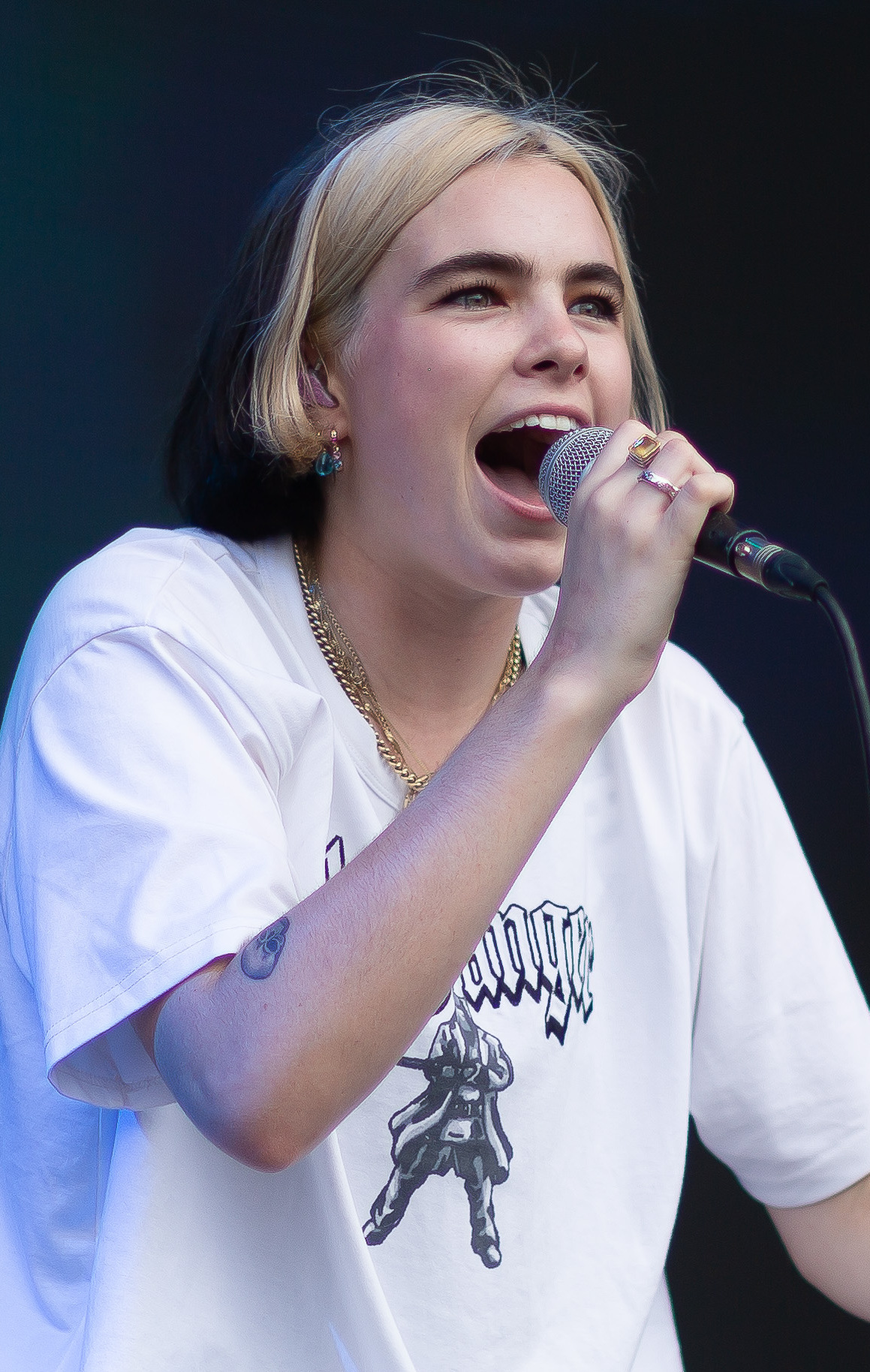
- Benee in 2020

Background information
- Also known as: Bene (2017–2019)
- Born: Stella Rose Bennett; 30 January 2000 (age 26)
- Origin: Grey Lynn, Auckland, New Zealand
- Occupations: Singer; songwriter
- Instrument: Vocals
- Works: Discography
- Years active: 2017–present
- Label: Republic
- Website: beneemusic.com

Stella Rose Bennett (born 30 January 2000), known professionally as Benee (stylised in all caps; pronounced /ˈbɛniː/) and formerly Bene, is a New Zealand singer and songwriter from Auckland. In both 2019 and 2020, she consecutively won Single of the Year, Best Solo Artist and Best Pop Artist at the Aotearoa Music Awards. Benee initially gained local prominence with her singles "Glitter" and "Soaked", before her 2019 single "Supalonely" saw international popularity following its success on the video-sharing platform TikTok. Benee subsequently released her debut album, Hey U X, in November 2020; her second, Ur an Angel I'm Just Particles, came out five years later.

Benee made her solo debut under the moniker of "Bene" with the 2017 single "Tough Guy". She released her debut EPs, Fire on Marzz and Stella & Steve, in June and November 2019; the latter charted in the US, Canada, and France. Since 2018, Benee has earned multiple entries on the Triple J Hottest 100 including three in the 2019 list. She released her third EP, Lychee, in March 2022, which charted at number 13 on the Official New Zealand Music Chart.

== Life and career ==
=== 2000–2020: Early life and "Supalonely" ===
Stella Rose Bennett was born to an actor and a video editor on 30 January 2000 and raised in the suburb of Grey Lynn in Auckland. She is dyslexic and attended St Mary's College, an all girls Catholic school where music was compulsory for four years. She took up the saxophone aged eight and the guitar in primary school, though briefly dropped music in favour of water polo, after which she began producing music aged 17. After leaving school, she worked as a dishwasher and a pizza cook and spent two weeks reading communications at the Auckland University of Technology before leaving after a meltdown.

Benee's first works were uploaded to SoundCloud under her previous nickname Bene. After Universal Music New Zealand enquired about them, her mother contacted her friend Paul McKessar, who in turn put her in touch with producer Josh Fountain. She released her debut single "Tough Guy" in late 2017 and "Soaked" in September 2018; the latter charted at No. 14 in New Zealand and No. 58 on Triple J's Hottest 100 of 2018, had gone double-platinum by April 2022, and was nominated for the 2019 APRA Silver Scroll.

Benee signed to Republic Records following the release of "Soaked" and supported Lily Allen at a February 2019 Auckland show during her No Shame Tour. Between May and June, she released the singles "Evil Spider" and "Want Me Back" and the EP Fire on Marzz. She promoted the last of these by releasing a music video for EP track "Glitter" and changed her name to Benee around this time. Fire on Marzz earned Benee the award for Best Solo Artist at the 2019 New Zealand Music Awards in November 2019, where she also won awards for Single of the Year with "Soaked", Best Breakthrough Artist, and Best Pop Artist. Fire on Marzz tracks "Glitter", "Find an Island", and "Evil Spider" each appeared in the 2019 Triple J Hottest 100 at 19, 25 and 51 respectively.

Benee's November 2019 EP Stella & Steve charted in the US, Canada, and France. Following her feature on Role Model's Oh, How Perfect track "Notice Me", "Glitter" and Stella & Steve track "Supalonely" went viral after spawning dance challenges on TikTok; the former won the 2020 APRA Silver Scroll Award. "Supalonely", which featured Gus Dapperton, once received seven billion plays on TikTok in a single month and made the Top 40 in more than 25 countries including Australia (6), the UK (18), and the US (39). She then performed the track on the American talk shows The Tonight Show Starring Jimmy Fallon, The Ellen DeGeneres Show, and Late Night with Seth Meyers, though a booked headlining North American tour with support from American singer Remi Wolf was cancelled due to the COVID-19 pandemic. She appeared on Elton John's Rocket Hour radio show in March and released a stripped back version of "Supalonely" as "Lownely" in May.

In July 2020, she released the single "Night Garden" featuring American producer Kenny Beats and British musician Bakar and became her country's first Apple Music's Up Next artist of the month. She then released the single "Snail", a track inspired by the behaviour of a type of mollusc she had observed during her time locked down by COVID-19, and featured on "Afterthought", a track on Joji's second studio album Nectar. In October, Benee was nominated for Best New Artist at the 2020 People's Choice Awards, formed the vanity label Olive Records and signed Raglan reggae musician Muroki to it, released the single "Plain" featuring Lily Allen and Flo Milli, and attracted controversy after calling the then-National Party leader Judith Collins a "bitch" during a Wellington concert. She then won Best New Zealand Act at the 2020 MTV Europe Music Awards and Best Solo Artist, Best Pop Artist, and an International Achievement Award at the 2020 Aotearoa Music Awards; at the latter, "Supalonely" won Single of the Year. During this period, she contributed a cover of Amy Winehouse's "Back to Black" to the Deezer-exclusive compilation album InVersions and released the single "Happen to Me" and the album Hey U X; the last of these was promoted with a music video for album track "Kool", featured collaborations with Mallrat and Muroki, and charted at No. 2 on the New Zealand Albums Chart.

=== 2021–present: Lychee and Ur an Angel I'm Just Particles ===
Benee featured on a remix of Bbno$ and Diamond Pistols' "Help Herself" in April 2021, announced in May and later postponed to early 2022 a regional tour in New Zealand, released a cover of Gotye and Kimbra's "Somebody That I Used to Know" in July, and featured on Dreamer Boy's "Are You Letting Go?" in October. She struggled with her mental health that year, for which she was diagnosed with obsessive–compulsive disorder; her October single "Doesn't Matter" discussed what she was going through. She followed the song with "Beach Boy" in February 2022 and the EP Lychee in March; the latter charted at No. 13 on the Official New Zealand Music Chart. Benee then moved to Los Angeles and collaborated with Sub Urban ("Uh Oh!"), Deaton Chris Anthony ("Good Buy My Old Life"), WizTheMc ("Fck Love"), Easy Life ("OTT"), Heavy Chest ("Sunday926"), Finn Falcon ("Light"), Johnny Orlando ("Fun Out of It"), and Jeremy Zucker ("I'm So Happy").

In early 2023, she featured on a remix of Spacey Jane's "Lots of Nothing", released the single "Green Honda", and featured on Dapperton's "Don't Let Me Down" from his album Henge; "Green Honda" appeared at No. 39 on Triple J's Hottest 100 of 2023. Her May single "Bagels" had been created with neuroscientists at Auckland University of Technology and designed to reduce anxiety as she felt that many young people were overly stressed. All proceeds went to local mental health charity Youthline, who had contacted Benee with the idea. Benee then collaborated with Mallrat on "Do It Again" in June and with Muroki on "Love Cocoon" in November; the former was the official song of the 2023 FIFA Women's World Cup and the latter later appeared on Muroki's EP Timezones.

In January 2024, Benee appeared as Kirsten in Rotterdam Film Festival's Head South, an account of the post-punk music scene in Christchurch in 1979 that received a wider release in October and had been devised by Jonathan Ogilvie. Her character was a budding musician who worked at a chemist. That May, she was announced as the support act for Olivia Rodrigo on the Australian leg of her Guts World Tour and credited as co-writer of NewJeans' single "How Sweet". Benee's description of "How Sweet" as a "a mix of three people's songs merged into one" was cited in a May 2026 lawsuit against the song's publisher Hybe by four Los Angeles songwriters who claimed that the song used a demo they had submitted and been told had been rejected.

Her September single "Sad Boiii" was followed by November single "Animal" and an announcement that she would be supporting Tate McRae on the UK and Europe leg of her Miss Possessive Tour. Benee then contributed "Zero To Hero" to the A Minecraft Movie soundtrack in early 2025 before releasing "Off The Rails" in June and "Cinnamon" in August. That October, she recorded a version of New Radicals "You Get What You Give" for a MTV Video Music Awards promo and released her own single "Underwater". Her November 2025 album Ur an Angel I'm Just Particles was promoted with a music video for "Princess", a song she had created with PinkPantheress. Four tracks from the album entered the Hot 20 Aotearoa Singles Chart, including "Princess" at No. 1. She collaborated with Pandora to launch a line of charms and played Sally at a Role Model gig in February 2026 and was nominated at the Aotearoa Music Awards for Best Pop Artist in April.

== Artistry ==
"I grew up listening to a bunch of different stuff that my parents played me, Radiohead and Björk but also Lily Allen and Amy Winehouse. Those female figures were a huge inspiration; these super powerful women who are unafraid of saying anything, super honest and raw definitely encouraged me to just say whatever the heck I want in a song."

— Benee in June 2020

Benee's music encompasses a wide range of genres. She was raised on the catalogs of Radiohead, Björk, Groove Armada, James Blake, and Grace Jones and has stated that she was inspired by fellow Auckland artist Lorde, to whom her earlier works were compared. The music video for "Beach Boy" was additionally inspired by Twilight.

== Discography ==
Studio albums

- Hey U X (2020)
- Ur an Angel I'm Just Particles (2025)

== Filmography ==
- Head South (2024, Kirsten)

== Awards and nominations ==
List of awards and nominations received by Benee
Organisation	Year	Category	Nominated work	Result	Ref.
Aotearoa Music Awards	2019	Breakthrough Artist of the Year	Herself	Won	
Aotearoa Music Awards	2019	Single of the Year	"Soaked"	Won	
Aotearoa Music Awards	2019	Best Solo Artist	Fire on Marzz	Won	
Aotearoa Music Awards	2019	Best Pop Artist	Fire on Marzz	Won	
Aotearoa Music Awards	2020	Single of the Year	"Supalonely"	Won	
Aotearoa Music Awards	2020	Best Solo Artist	Stella & Steve	Won	
Aotearoa Music Awards	2020	Best Pop Artist	Stella & Steve	Won	
Aotearoa Music Awards	2021	Album of the Year	Hey U X	Nominated	
Aotearoa Music Awards	2021	Best Solo Artist	Hey U X	Nominated	
Aotearoa Music Awards	2021	Best Pop Artist	Herself	Won	
Aotearoa Music Awards	2022	Best Pop Artist	Herself	Won	
Aotearoa Music Awards	2026	Best Pop Artist	Herself	Nominated	
Aotearoa Music Awards	2026	People's Choice Award	Herself	Nominated	
APRA Music Awards	2019	Silver Scroll	"Soaked"	Shortlisted	
APRA Music Awards	2020	Silver Scroll	"Glitter"	Won	
MTV Europe Music Awards	2019	Best New Zealand Act	Herself	Nominated	
MTV Europe Music Awards	2020	Best New Act	Herself	Nominated	
MTV Europe Music Awards	2020	Best New Zealand Act	Herself	Won	
MTV Europe Music Awards	2020	Best Push Act	Herself	Nominated	
MTV Europe Music Awards	2023	Best New Zealand Act	Herself	Nominated	
MTV Video Music Awards	2020	Push Best New Artist	Herself	Nominated	
People's Choice Awards	2020	The New Artist of 2020	Herself	Nominated	

=== Lists ===
Publisher	Listicle	Year (Note: Indicates the year of ceremony. Each year is linked to the article about the awards held that year, wherever possible.)	Recipient(s)	Result	Ref.
Triple J	"Hottest 100"	2018	"Soaked"	58th	
Triple J	"Hottest 100"	2019	"Glitter"	19th	
Triple J	"Hottest 100"	2019	"Find an Island"	25th	
Triple J	"Hottest 100"	2019	"Evil Spider"	51st	
Triple J	"Hottest 100"	2020	"Kool"	100th	
Triple J	"Hottest 100"	2022	"Beach Boy"	81st	
Triple J	"Hottest 100"	2023	"Green Honda"	39th	

== Tours ==
=== Headlining ===
- 2019 – Australian East Coast tour
- 2020 – New Zealand tour
- 2022 – Regional New Zealand, "Aotearoa" Tour (Rescheduled)
- 2022 – "World tour"
- 2026 – The Particles Tour

=== Supporting ===
- Lily Allen – No Shame Tour (2019; 1 show)
- Wallows – Model World Tour (2024; 27 shows)
- Olivia Rodrigo – Guts World Tour (2024; 4 shows)
- Tate McRae – Miss Possessive Tour (2025; 22 shows)

== See also ==
- List of New Zealand musicians
