= 1962 in animation =

Events in 1962 in animation.

== Events ==
=== January ===
- January 6: The first episode of Beany and Cecil is broadcast.
- January 20: Robert McKimson's Bugs Bunny cartoon Wet Hare premieres, produced by Warner Bros. Cartoons.

=== March ===
- March 23: Gene Deitch's Tom and Jerry cartoon High Steaks premieres.
- March 31: Arthur Davis' final Daffy Duck cartoon Quackodile Tears premieres, produced by Warner Bros. Cartoons.

=== April ===
- April 9: 34th Academy Awards: Surogat by Dušan Vukotić wins the Academy Award for Best Animated Short.
- April 13: Gene Deitch's Tom and Jerry cartoon Mouse into Space premieres.
- April 21: Friz Freleng and Hawley Pratt's Crows' Feat produced by Warner Bros. Cartoons is released, It marks the final appearance of Elmer Fudd in the Golden age of American animation.
- April 27: The Flintstones concludes its second season on ABC with the episode "Take Me Out to the Ball Game".

=== March ===
- March 10: Robert McKimson's Sylvester cartoon Fish and Slips premieres, produced by Warner Bros. Cartoons. Also starring Sylvester Jr.

=== May ===
- May 12: Friz Freleng's short Mexican Boarders premieres; starring Speedy Gonzales, Sylvester the Cat, & the former's cousin Slowpoke Rodriguez. Was produced by Warner Bros. Cartoons.
- May 18: Gene Deitch's Tom and Jerry cartoon Landing Stripling premieres.

=== June ===
- June 2: Chuck Jones, Maurice Noble and Tom Ray's Wile E. Coyote and Road Runner featurette Adventures of the Road Runner premieres, produced by Warner Bros. Cartoons. It was an unsold television pilot rejected by ABC and contained the 1954 Ralph Phillips cartoon, From A to Z-Z-Z-Z.
- June 9: Robert McKimson's Bugs Bunny and Tasmanian Devil cartoon Bill of Hare premieres, produced by Warner Bros. Cartoons.
- June 22: Gene Deitch's Tom and Jerry cartoon Calypso Cat premieres.
- June 30: Chuck Jones and Maurice Noble's Wile E. Coyote and Road Runner cartoon Zoom at the Top premieres, produced by Warner Bros. Cartoons.

=== July ===
- July 20: Gene Deitch's Tom and Jerry cartoon Dicky Moe premieres.
- July 21: Robert McKimson's Foghorn Leghorn cartoon The Slick Chick premieres, produced by Warner Bros. Cartoons.
- July 23: Chuck Jones is fired by Warner Bros. Cartoons after they find out that he secretly worked for a rival cartoon studio, UPA, on the upcoming film Gay Purr-ee. Jones will go to establish his own animation studio.

=== August ===
- August 7: The Bugs Bunny Show aired its final episode on ABC, but still continued to air in reruns.
- August 10: Gene Deitch's Tom and Jerry cartoon The Tom and Jerry Cartoon Kit premieres.
- August 18: Chuck Jones' Pepé Le Pew cartoon Louvre Come Back to Me! premieres, produced by Warner Bros. Cartoons. Also starring Penelope Pussycat (named Felice) & Claude Cat (named Pierre). This marks the final appearances of Claude, Penelope, & Pepé in the Golden Age of Animation.

=== September ===
- September 3: The first episode of Wally Gator is broadcast.
- September 14:
  - Gene Deitch's Tom and Jerry cartoon Tall in the Trap premieres.
  - Season 3 of The Flintstones begins on ABC with the premiere of the episode "Dino Goes Hollyrock".
- September 21: Karel Zeman's The Fabulous Baron Munchausen is first released.
- September 22: Friz Freleng and Hawley Pratt's Tweety and Sylvester cartoon The Jet Cage premieres, produced by Warner Bros. Cartoons. This was Freleng's final short starring Tweety.
- September 23: The first episode of The Jetsons is broadcast.
- Specific date unknown: Lou Scheimer, Norm Prescott and Hal Sutherland co-found the animation studio Filmation.

=== October ===
- October 12: Gene Deitch's Tom and Jerry cartoon Sorry Safari premieres. This short marks the final appearance of Tom's owner (nicknamed Clint Clobber) from this era, due to him being negatively-received by fans for his constant abuse towards the titular cat.
- October 19: Tatsuo Yoshida, Kenji Yoshida and Ippei Kuri establish Tatsunoko Productions.
- October 20: Robert McKimson's Foghorn Leghorn and Barnyard Dawg cartoon Mother Was a Rooster premieres, produced by Warner Bros. Cartoons.
- October 28: The first episode of Fireball XL5 is broadcast.

=== November ===
- November 1: Gene Deitch's Tom and Jerry cartoon Buddies Thicker Than Water premieres. This features the debut of the thin lady as Tom's owner who would be used by Chuck Jones, replacing his previous owner.
- November 10: Robert McKimson's Daffy Duck cartoon Good Noose premieres, produced by Warner Bros. Cartoons.
- November 23: Poul Ilsøe's Svinedrengen og prinsessen på ærten premieres.

=== December ===
- December 8: Friz Freleng's Bugs Bunny and Yosemite Sam cartoon Shishkabugs premieres, produced by Warner Bros. Cartoons.
- December 17: Abe Levitow's Gay Purr-ee premieres.
- December 18: Mister Magoo's Christmas Carol first airs on television. It will become a holiday season classic.
- December 21: Carmen Get It!, the final Tom and Jerry cartoon by Gene Deitch, premieres. Deitch failed to produce anymore Tom and Jerry short films for MGM as Chuck Jones would take over production, which returned to Hollywood after five years.
- December 29: Chuck Jones' Martian Through Georgia premieres, produced by Warner Bros. Cartoons.

=== Specific date unknown ===
- Nippon Animation is founded.
- Vera Tsekhanovskaya and Mikhail Tsekhanovsky's The Wild Swans premieres.

== Films released ==
- January 1 - Heaven and Earth Magic (United States)
- June 16 - Arabian Nights: The Adventures of Sinbad (Japan)
- August 14 - The Bath (Soviet Union)
- August 25 - Otogi's Voyage Around the World (Japan)
- November 23 - The Pig Boy and The Princess and the Pea (Denmark)
- December 17 - Gay Purr-ee (United States)
- December 18 - Mister Magoo's Christmas Carol (United States)
- Specific date unknown:
  - Joseph and the Dreamer (Israel)
  - The Wild Swans (Soviet Union)

== Television series ==
- January 6 - Beany and Cecil debuts on ABC.
- February 6 - Space Angel debuts in syndication.
- August 28 - Bolek i Lolek debuts on Telewizja Polska.
- September 3: The Hanna-Barbera New Cartoon Series, Lippy the Lion and Hardy Har Har, Touché Turtle and Dum Dum, and Wally Gator debut in syndication.
- September 5 - Deputy Dawg debuts on CBS.
- September 23 - The Jetsons debuts on ABC and in syndication.
- Specific date unknown - Snuffy Smith and Barney Google debuts in syndication.

== Television specials ==
- December 18 - Mr. Magoo's Christmas Carol debuts on NBC.

== Births ==
=== January ===
- January 4: Robin Kohn, American former child actress (voice of Lucy Van Pelt from 1972 to 1973).
- January 6: Karen Malach, American television writer (Vor-Tech: Undercover Conversion Squad, Ned's Newt) and producer (The Adventures of T-Rex, Nickelodeon Animation Studio).
- January 10: C. Martin Croker, American animator (Space Ghost Coast to Coast, Cartoon Planet, Aqua Teen Hunger Force, The Brak Show, Assy McGee) and voice actor (voice of Zorak and Moltar in Space Ghost Coast to Coast, Dr. Weird and Steve in Aqua Teen Hunger Force, Young Man in Perfect Hair Forever), (d. 2016).
- January 17: Jim Carrey, Canadian-American actor and comedian (portrayed Dr. Robotnik in Sonic the Hedgehog, Sonic the Hedgehog 2, and Sonic the Hedgehog 3, voice of Horton in Horton Hears A Who!, Ebenezer Scrooge, the Ghost of Christmas Past and the Ghost of Christmas Present in A Christmas Carol, the Exterminator in Itsy Bitsy Spider).
- January 23:
  - Steve Box, English animator and director (Aardman Animations).
  - Richard Roxburgh, Australian actor and filmmaker (voice of Boron in Legend of the Guardians: The Owls of Ga'Hoole, Flip in Maya the Bee Movie, and Maya the Bee: The Honey Games, William Bill in Blinky Bill the Movie).
- January 29: Nicholas Turturro, American actor (voice of Deadman in Justice League Dark, Melager in Hercules, Cop #1 in Recess: School's Out, Anthony's dad in Leo).

=== February ===
- February 2: Michael T. Weiss, American actor (voice of Etrigan in Justice League and Justice League Unlimited, Nizam Toth in The Mummy, Captain Atom in Young Justice, Adam Strange in Batman: The Brave and the Bold, Mountain Rescue Hero in Higglytown Heroes, continued voice of Tarzan in the Tarzan franchise).
- February 5: Jennifer Jason Leigh, American actress (voice of Tempest in Hercules, Lily in Todd McFarlane's Spawn, Cetea in the Superman: The Animated Series episode "Absolute Power", Eunice in the Mission Hill episode "Kevin Loves Weirdie", Amy in the King of the Hill episode "I Remember Mono", Alexandra in the Adventures from the Book of Virtues episode "Gratitude", Bridget in Hey Arnold!: The Movie).
- February 6: Axl Rose, American singer and songwriter (voiced himself in the New Looney Tunes episode "Armageddon Outta Here" and the Scooby-Doo and Guess Who? episode "Dark Diner of Route 66!").
- February 7:
  - Guy Moon, American composer (Cartoon All-Stars to the Rescue, Hanna-Barbera, Nickelodeon Animation Studio, Grim & Evil, The Adventures of Rocky and Bullwinkle, Johnny Test), (d. 2026).
  - Eddie Izzard, English actor and comedian (voice of Miles Axelrod in Cars 2, Voldemort in The Lego Batman Movie, Dr. Schadenfeude in Igor, Nigel in The Wild, Angus Scattergood in Rock Dog, Snerz in Green Eggs and Ham, Burnish in Abominable, Cadia in The Dark Crystal: Age of Resistance).
- February 12: András Erkel, Hungarian producer (Varga Studio, founder of Studio Baestarts), (d. 2014).
- February 14: Russ Leatherman, American actor and co-founder of Moviefone (voice of Mr. Moviefone in the Futurama episode "Raging Bender" and the Family Guy episode "I Dream of Jesus").
- February 17: Lou Diamond Phillips, Filipino-American actor and director (voice of Victor Delgado in Elena of Avalor, Surak in The Lion Guard, Chief Bill Bayani in Firebuds, Coatl in the Happily Ever After: Fairy Tales for Every Child episode "The Shoemaker and the Elves", Martin in the Adventures from the Book of Virtues episode "Charity", Narragansett Tribe Leader in the Family Guy episode "Pawtucket Pat", Rusty in the American Dad! episode "There Will Be Bad Blood").
- February 20: Dwayne McDuffie, American comic book writer, television producer and writer (Warner Bros. Animation), (d. 2011).
- February 22: Steve Irwin, Australian zookeeper, conservationist, television personality, wildlife expert and environmentalist (voice of Trev in Happy Feet), (d. 2006).
- February 27: Adam Baldwin, American actor (voice of Finn in Jackie Chan Adventures, York in Static Shock, Superman in Superman: Doomsday, Hal Jordan, Jonah Hex, and Rick Flag in Justice League Unlimited, Breakdown in Transformers: Prime, Metamorpho in Beware the Batman, Vance Astro in Hulk and the Agents of S.M.A.S.H. and Guardians of the Galaxy, Sven in The Zeta Project episode "Crime Waves").

=== March ===
- March 9: Mike Kazaleh, American comic book artist, animator (Pinocchio and the Emperor of the Night, Mighty Mouse: The New Adventures, The Butter Battle Book, The Simpsons, Camp Candy, Cool World, Battletoads), storyboard artist (Camp Candy, The Simpsons, Tiny Toon Adventures, The Lionhearts, The Brothers Flub, Teamo Supremo, Jakers! The Adventures of Piggley Winks, Hi Hi Puffy AmiYumi, Johnny Test, Alpha and Omega, Mighty Magiswords) and writer (Tiny Toon Adventures, Hi Hi Puffy AmiYumi, Mighty Magiswords).
- March 10: Jasmine Guy, American actress (voice of Sawyer in Cats Don't Dance, Ms. Fileshare and Ava in Cyberchase, Jonae in the Happily Ever After: Fairy Tales for Every Child episode "Rumpelstiltskin").
- March 12:
  - Darryl Strawberry, American former professional baseball player and author (voiced himself in The Simpsons episode "Homer at the Bat").
  - Chris Sanders, American animator, film director (Lilo & Stitch, How to Train Your Dragon, The Wild Robot), and voice actor (voice of Stitch in the Lilo & Stitch franchise).
  - Titus Welliver, American actor (voice of Ratko in Castlevania, Carmine Falcone in Batman: The Long Halloween).
- March 13: Dorothy Elias-Fahn, American actress (voice of Meryl Strife in Trigun, Kamiya Kaoru in Rurouni Kenshin, Naru Narusegawa in Love Hina, Tomoe Kashiwaba in Rozen Maiden, Nina Purpleton in Mobile Suit Gundam 0083, Chizuru Minamoto in Kanokon, Konan in Naruto, Caline Bustier in Miraculous: Tales of Ladybug & Cat Noir).
- March 15: Terence Trent D'Arby, American singer and songwriter (voice of DJ Rock in the Static Shock episode "They're Playing My Song").
- March 16: Masaki Kajishima, Japanese animator and storyboard artist (Tenchi Muyo!, Dual! Parallel Trouble Adventure).
- March 20:
  - Christoph Lauenstein, German producer, director and writer (Balance, Luis and the Aliens, Spy Cat).
  - Wolfgang Lauenstein, German film director, writer and animator (Balance, Luis and the Aliens, Spy Cat).
- March 21:
  - Matthew Broderick, American actor and singer (voice of adult Simba in The Lion King franchise, Tack in Arabian Knight, Adam Flayman in Bee Movie, the title character in The Tale of Despereaux, Dad in Wonder Park, Dream Warrior and Spirit of the Forest in Adventure Time, Joseph Sugarman in BoJack Horseman, Max in the Cyberchase episode "Father's Day", Talking Cat in the Rick and Morty episode "Claw and Hoarder: Special Ricktim's Morty").
  - Rosie O'Donnell, American comedian, television producer, actress, author, and television personality (voice of Terk in Tarzan, Scout Leader in The Ren & Stimpy Show episode "Eat My Cookies", Bouncing Bumble Queen in the Captain Jake and the Never Land Pirates episode "Follow the Bouncing Bumble", Townie in the American Dad! episode "Camp Campawanda").
- March 22 : Gen Fukunaga, Japanese-born American engineer (Funimation).
- March 26:
  - Chris Bailey, American animator and director (Walt Disney Animation Studios).
  - Keith Diamond, American actor (voice of Agent J in Men in Black: The Series, Rapid Run in Transformers: Robots in Disguise, Ronald Booker in Kangaroo Jack: G'Day U.S.A.!).
- March 28: Eric Gilliland, American screenwriter (The Thief and the Cobbler) and actor (voice of Spud in Hair High), (d. 2024).

=== April ===
- April 6: Steven Levitan, American director, television producer and writer (The Critic).
- April 15: Tom Kane, American voice actor (voice of Professor Utonium, Him, and Talking Dog in The Powerpuff Girls, Darwin Thornberry in The Wild Thornberrys, Lord Monkey Fist in Kim Possible, Mr. Herriman in Foster's Home for Imaginary Friends, Yoda in the Star Wars franchise, Magneto in Wolverine and the X-Men, Iron Man in Next Avengers: Heroes of Tomorrow, Ultron in Next Avengers: Heroes of Tomorrow and The Avengers: Earth's Mightiest Heroes, Guard #1 in Shrek the Third, Doctor Doom in the Spider-Man episode "Secret Wars, Chapter 3: Doom"), (d. 2026).
- April 17: Bill Kopp, American animator, writer, and actor (creator and voice of the title character in Eek! The Cat).
- April 18: Jeff Dunham, American comedian and actor (voice of Mole in The Nut Job and The Nut Job 2: Nutty by Nature, Farmer Smurf in Smurfs: The Lost Village, Schmatko in Big Top Scooby-Doo!, Gen in From Up on Poppy Hill, himself in the Scooby-Doo and Guess Who? episode "Too Many Dummies!").
- April 22: Sultan Pepper, American television writer (CatDog, The Angry Beavers, Crashbox), (d. 2009).
- April 26: Debra Wilson, American actress and comedian (voice of Terra Snapdragon in The Owl House, Great Grandma Fran in Rapsittie Street Kids: Believe In Santa, Ramaraffe in Mao Mao: Heroes of Pure Heart, Grandma Shark in Baby Shark's Big Show!, Maxine Sez in Ben 10, Debbie in Over the Hedge, Amanda Waller in My Adventures with Superman, Daisy Duck in season 2 of Mickey Mouse Funhouse).
- April 27: Mike Polcino, American animator, storyboard artist (The Simpsons), sheet timer (King of the Hill, Family Guy, Fillmore!, Dawn of the Croods), writer (The Twisted Tales of Felix the Cat) and director (Film Roman).
- April 28: Stig Bergqvist, Swedish animator, storyboard artist (Duckman, Squirrel Boy), producer (Stressed Eric) and director (Duckman, Rugrats in Paris: The Movie).

=== May ===
- May 6: Rob LaZebnik, American screenwriter and producer (The Simpsons, Extinct).
- May 9: Brendan O'Brien, American voice actor (provided additional voices for Todd McFarlane's Spawn), (d, 2023).
- May 12: Milton Knight, American cartoonist, animator, character designer (Cool World, Adventures of Sonic the Hedgehog), storyboard artist (Adventures of Sonic the Hedgehog, C Bear and Jamal, The Mouse and the Monster, Pigs Next Door, Johnny Test), writer and director (The Twisted Tales of Felix the Cat).
- May 14: Danny Huston, American actor, director and screenwriter (voice of Sam Lane in Justice League: The Flashpoint Paradox, Préfet Maynott in A Monster in Paris).
- May 17: Craig Ferguson, Scottish-American comedian, actor, writer and television host (voice of Roddy MacStew in Freakazoid!, Agent Epsilon and Orion in Hercules, NOS-4-A2 in Buzz Lightyear of Star Command, Samuel T. Philander in The Legend of Tarzan, Gobber in the How to Train Your Dragon franchise, Owl in Winnie the Pooh, Lord Macintosh in Brave, Whitney Doubleday in Big Top Scooby-Doo!, Craig and Not a Dalek in Postman Pat: The Movie, Nat in The Hero of Color City, Giles in Duck Duck Goose, Evil Barry in American Dad!, Doorknob in Alice's Wonderland Bakery, Cammander, French Man and Weatherman in Aaahh!!! Real Monsters, Jope in The Wild Thornberrys episode "Dances with Dingoes", Wizard and TV Announcer in The Angry Beavers episode "Beavemaster", Susan Boil in the Futurama episode "Attack of the Killer App").
- May 22: Eric Fredrickson, Canadian animator (Atkinson Film-Arts, The Raccoons, Rupert) and storyboard artist (Atkinson Film-Arts, Young Robin Hood, James Bond Jr., Stunt Dawgs, The Legend of White Fang, Doug, Adventures in Odyssey, Action Man, Life with Louie, Happily Ever After: Fairy Tales for Every Child, Family Guy, Stuart Little, American Dad!), (d. 2016).
- May 23: Karen Duffy, American writer, model, television personality, and actress (voice of Sketch in Pepper Ann, Linda Otter in Fantastic Mr. Fox).
- May 26:
  - Peter Avanzino, American animator, storyboard artist (The Simpsons, Little Dracula, The Ren & Stimpy Show, Klasky Csupo, Rocko's Modern Life), writer (The Ren & Stimpy Show) and director (The Ren & Stimpy Show, Duckman, The Wild Thornberrys, Futurama, Baby Blues, Drawn Together, Sit Down, Shut Up, How Murray Saved Christmas, Disenchantment).
  - Bobcat Goldthwait, American actor, comedian, director, and screenwriter (voice of Pain in the Hercules franchise and House of Mouse, Muggle in Capitol Critters, the title character in The Moxy Show, XL in Buzz Lightyear of Star Command, Nosy in the Lilo & Stitch franchise, Pop Fizz in Skylanders Academy, Big Bad Wolf in the Tales from the Crypt episode "The Third Pig", Uncle Creamy in The Tick episode "The Tick vs. Education", Zoopie in the Random! Cartoons episode "Squirly Town", Dickie in the Randy Cunningham: 9th Grade Ninja episode "Stank'd to the Future", Zingo in the Aqua Teen Hunger Force episode "Storage Zeebles", Johnny Crasher in the Regular Show episode "The Heart of a Stuntman", JT in the Spy Kids: Mission Critical episode "Secrets & Spies", himself in the Dr. Katz, Professional Therapist episode "Studio Guy" and The Simpsons episode "The Last Temptation of Krust").
  - Genie Francis, American actress (voice of Marsha and Marica in Teacher's Pet, Betty Ross in the first 6 episodes of The Incredible Hulk).
- May 27: Andrew Overtoom, American animator, storyboard artist (SpongeBob SquarePants, Billy Dilley's Super-Duper Subterranean Summer), sheet timer (Nickelodeon Animation Studio, Disney Television Animation, Maya & Miguel, Pet Alien, Family Guy, The Proud Family Movie, Squirrel Boy, Adventure Time, Spider-Man), writer (Billy Dilley's Super-Duper Subterranean Summer) and director (Nickelodeon Animation Studio, My Life with Morrissey, All in the Bunker, Clarence, Pickle and Peanut).
- May 31: Noriko Hidaka, Japanese actress (voice of Satsuki Kusakabe in My Neighbor Totoro).

=== June ===
- June 5: Jeff Garlin, American comedian and actor (voice of Captain B. McCrea in Wall-E, Buttercup in the Toy Story franchise, Jeff in the Dr. Katz, Professional Therapist episode "Alibi", Dan in the King of the Hill episode "The Fat and the Furious", Pat Croce in the Tom Goes to the Mayor episode "Rats Off to Ya", Camoman in the Duck Dodgers episode "Bonafide Heroes", Duke in the Shorty McShorts' Shorts episode "Flip-Flopped", the title character in the SpongeBob SquarePants episode "Cuddle E. Hugs", Perry Babcock in ParaNorman, himself in the Family Guy episode "The 2,0000 Year Old Virgin").
- June 7: Lance Reddick, American actor (voice of General Lunaris in DuckTales, Falcon in The Avengers: Earth's Mightiest Heroes, Cutler in Tron: Uprising, Ra's al Ghul in Beware the Batman, Agent Clappers in Paradise PD, Alan Rails in the Rick and Morty episode "Vindicators 3: The Return of Worldender"), (d. 2023).
- June 10:
  - Harald Siepermann, German comics artist and animator (Alfred J. Kwak), (d. 2013).
  - Gina Gershon, American actress (voice of Catwoman in The Batman, Shikata in Spider-Man: The New Animated Series, Regina in Red Shoes and the Seven Dwarfs).
  - Carolyn Hennesy, American actress, writer, and animal advocate (voice of Leia Organa in Star Wars Resistance, Bambi's Mother in Bambi II, Vera Ronstadt in The Big O, Rose in Street Fighter Alpha: The Animation, Athena Aerios in Appleseed, Mrs. Godfrey in Big Nate).
- June 11: Toshihiko Seki, Japanese actor (voice of Duo Maxwell in Mobile Suit Gundam Wing, Iruka Umino in Naruto, Kaien Shiba in Bleach, Genjo Sanzo in Saiyuki).
- June 12: Kevin Lima, American film director and animator (Walt Disney Animation Studios, The Wild).
- June 15: Malcolm Danare, American actor (voice of Mendel Craven in Godzilla: The Series, Kipling in Monster High).
- June 21: Paul Cadieux, Canadian producer (Bibi et Geneviève, Oggy and the Cockroaches, The Triplets of Belleville, co-founder of Tooncan).
- June 23:
  - Mark DeCarlo, American actor, television host, comedian, and internet personality (voice of Hugh Neutron in Jimmy Neutron: Boy Genius and The Adventures of Jimmy Neutron: Boy Genius, Flippy in Santa vs. the Snowman 3D, Fly in The Ant Bully, Bingo, Chubs and Mr. Junks in Back at the Barnyard, Jake Houseman in the Family Guy episode "Padre de Familia", Rob Hackett in the Rugrats episode "America's Wackiest Home Movies", Lefty in the Handy Manny episode "Hank's Birthday", additional voices in Duckman, Immigrants and Johnny Bravo Goes to Bollywood).
  - Steve Shelley, American drummer and member of Sonic Youth (voiced himself in The Simpsons episode "Homerpalooza").
- June 29: Amanda Donohoe, English actress (voice of Queen in the Batman Beyond episode "Dead Man's Hand", Lady Waltham in The Legend of Tarzan episode "Tarzan and the Gauntlet of Vengeance").

=== July ===
- July 1: Andre Braugher, American actor (voice of Darkseid in Superman/Batman: Apocalypse, Derge in Jackie Chan Adventures, Woodchuck Coodchuck-Berkowitz in BoJack Horseman, Al Granger in Spirit Untamed, Julian Andrews in the Happily Ever After: Fairy Tales for Every Child episode "The Princess and the Pauper"), (d. 2023).
- July 2: Doug Benson, American comedian, television host and actor (voice of Bassoon in Summer Camp Island, Bane in The Lego Batman Movie).
- July 3: Thomas Gibson, American actor and director (voice of Deathstroke in Son of Batman, Paul Mornay in The Real Adventures of Jonny Quest episode "Ghost Quest").
- July 4: Bill Fulton, American composer (I Am Weasel, Poochini).
- July 6: Carolyn Omine, American television writer and producer (Nickelodeon Animation Studio, The Simpsons).
- July 13: Tom Kenny, American voice actor and comedian (voice of the title character, Gary, and French Narrator in SpongeBob SquarePants, Ice King in Adventure Time, Heffer Wolfe, Chuck Chameleon and Slippy the Slug in Rocko's Modern Life, the Narrator, Mayor of Townsville, and Snake in The Powerpuff Girls, Dog in CatDog, Carl Chryniszzswics in Johnny Bravo, Wayne Cramp in The Cramp Twins, Cupid in The Fairly OddParents, Eduardo in Foster's Home for Imaginary Friends, Penguin in The Batman, Gibson in Super Robot Monkey Team Hyperforce Go!, Plastic Man in Batman: The Brave and the Bold, Scoutmaster Lumpus and Slinkman in Camp Lazlo, Tommy in Hoodwinked!, Jake Spidermonkey and Henry Armadillo in My Gym Partner's a Monkey, Dr. Two-Brains, TJ Botsford, and Sheriff Warden Chalmers in WordGirl, Iron Man, Captain America, and MODOK in The Super Hero Squad Show, Commander Peepers in Wander Over Yonder, Fethry Duck in DuckTales, continued voice of Rabbit in the Winnie the Pooh franchise).
- July 15: Martin Roach, Canadian actor (voice of Master Yo in Yin Yang Yo!, Falcon in The Avengers: United They Stand, Dr. Claw in Inspector Gadget, Sparkie in Mike the Knight).
- July 17: Christopher Corey Smith, American actor (voice of Hawkeye in Marvel Future Avengers and Marvel Disk Wars: The Avengers, Kite in Hunter x Hunter, Tom Dupain, Roger Raincomprix, and Wayzz in Miraculous: Tales of Ladybug & Cat Noir, Crogar in Zak Storm).
- July 20: Carlos Alazraqui, American voice actor and comedian (voice of Rocko, Spunky, and Leon Chameleon in Rocko's Modern Life, Lazlo, Clam and Chef McMuesli in Camp Lazlo, Winslow and Lube in CatDog, Mr. Crocker in The Fairly OddParents, Rikochet in Mucha Lucha!, Walden in Wow! Wow! Wubbzy!, Felipe in Handy Manny, Scissors in Rock Paper Scissors, Houston in Space Chimps and Space Chimps 2: Zartog Strikes Back, Rad Dudesman and Scout in Ben 10: Omniverse).
- July 21: Ike Eisenmann, American former actor, producer, and sound effects specialist (voice of Little Green Sprout for Green Giant, The Boy Who Cried Wolf and Umpire in Puff the Magic Dragon in the Land of the Living Lies, Nick Burns in Challenge of the GoBots, Alexander Bumstead in Blondie & Dagwood and Blondie & Dagwood: Second Wedding Workout, Cub Jones in Ring Raiders).
- July 30: Alton Brown, American chef and actor (voice of Lysander Floovox in Miles from Tomorrowland, Yum LaBouche in the Big Hero 6: The Series episode "Food Fight", Nicholas Withers in the SpongeBob SquarePants episode "House Fancy", himself in the Scooby-Doo and Guess Who? episode "The Feast of Dr. Frankenfooder!").
- July 31: Chris Kreski, American writer, biographer and screenwriter (Beavis and Butt-Head, Celebrity Deathmatch), (d. 2005).

=== August ===
- August 4: Roger Clemens, American former professional baseball pitcher (voiced himself in The Simpsons episode "Homer at the Bat").
- August 6:
  - Michelle Yeoh, Malaysian actress (voice of Soothsayer in Kung Fu Panda 2, Master Chow in Minions: The Rise of Gru, Yuki in Paws of Fury: The Legend of Hank).
  - Søren Hyldgaard, Danish film composer (When Life Departs, Help! I'm a Fish), (d. 2018).
- August 10: Suzanne Collins, American author and television writer (Little Bear, Generation O!, Oswald, Clifford's Puppy Days, Wow! Wow! Wubbzy!).
- August 11:
  - Rob Minkoff, American filmmaker (The Lion King, Stuart Little, Stuart Little 2, Mr. Peabody & Sherman).
  - Ian Carney, English comic book writer and television writer (HIT Entertainment, The Cramp Twins, King Arthur's Disasters, Aardman Animations, Frankenstein's Cat, Combo Niños, Chuggington, Noddy in Toyland, Octonauts, The Hive, Tree Fu Tom, Angry Birds Toons, Toot the Tiny Tugboat, The Furchester Hotel, Thunderbirds Are Go, Messy Goes to OKIDO, Zip Zip, Tee and Mo, JoJo & Gran Gran).
- August 16: Steve Carell, American actor and comedian (voice of Felonious Gru in the Despicable Me franchise, Hammy in Over the Hedge, Ned McDodd in Horton Hears a Who!, Mr. Delancey in the Fillmore! episode "Field Trip of the Just", Dan Gillick in The Simpsons episode "Penny-Wiseguys").
- August 18: Noam Kaniel, Israeli musician (composed the theme songs of Miraculous: Tales of Ladybug & Cat Noir, Code Lyoko, Zak Storm, Robotboy, Glitter Force, and Glitter Force: Doki Doki, performed the theme songs of Heathcliff and Code Lyoko).
- August 20:
  - Sophie Aldred, English actress (voice of Dennis in Dennis the Menace and Gnasher, Muck in Bob the Builder, Tom in Tree Fu Tom, Mrs. Rabbit in Peter Rabbit).
  - James Marsters, American actor (voice of Mister Fantastic in The Super Hero Squad Show, Zamasu in Dragon Ball Super, Sergei in Spider-Man: The New Animated Series, Lex Luthor in Superman: Doomsday, Nosferatu in the DuckTales episode "The Trickening!", Korvac in the Ultimate Spider-Man episode "Guardians of the Galaxy", Faro Argyus in the Star Wars: The Clone Wars episode "Cloak of Darkness").
- August 24: David Koechner, American actor and comedian (voice of Dag in Barnyard, Dick Reynolds in American Dad!, Principal Dean in Regular Show, Mr. Meaner in The Epic Tales of Captain Underpants, Roger "Bob Pogo" Pogrohovich in F is for Family, Clancy Q. Sleepyjeans in Whatever Happened to Robot Jones?, Mac Antfee in Randy Cunningham: 9th Grade Ninja).
- August 25: Tommy Blacha, American voice actor, writer, and producer (Metalocalypse, TV Funhouse, Mongo Wrestling Alliance).
- August 27: Vic Mignogna, American voice actor (voice of Edward Elric in Fullmetal Alchemist, Broly in the Dragon Ball franchise, Ura Urashima in YuYu Hakusho, Wilheim in Xenosaga: The Animation, Ikkaku Madarame and Senbonzakura in Bleach, Qrow Branwen in RWBY, Jalil Kubdel in Miraculous: Tales of Ladybug & Cat Noir).
- August 28: David Zuckerman, American television producer and writer (King of the Hill, Family Guy, American Dad!).
- August 29: Ian James Corlett, Canadian voice actor (voice of Goku and Master Roshi in the Ocean dub of Dragon Ball Z, the title character in Mega Man, Cheetor in Beast Wars: Transformers, Baby Taz in Baby Looney Tunes, Dr. Wily in Captain N: The Game Master), and author (creator of Being Ian and co-creator of Yvon of the Yukon).
- August 31: Dee Bradley Baker, American actor (voice of Clone Troopers in the Star Wars franchise, Klaus Heisler in American Dad!, Momo and Appa in Avatar: The Last Airbender, Numbuh 4 in Codename: Kids Next Door, Perry the Platypus in Phineas and Ferb, Daffy Duck in Space Jam, Dopey in The 7D, Squilliam and Bubble Bass in SpongeBob SquarePants, Animal in Muppet Babies, Turner in Handy Manny, Mister Fantastic in The Avengers: Earth's Mightiest Heroes, Lizard in The Spectacular Spider-Man and Ultimate Spider-Man, Senor Siniestro in El Tigre: The Adventures of Manny Rivera, Dad in Cow and Chicken, various characters in the Ben 10 franchise).

=== September ===
- September 8: Thomas Kretschmann, German actor (voice of Professor Zündapp in Cars 2).
- September 9: Kevin Grevioux, American screenwriter and actor (voice of Black Beetle in Young Justice, Super-Skrull in Hulk and the Agents of S.M.A.S.H., Terrax in The Avengers: Earth's Mightiest Heroes episode "Avengers Assemble!", Solomon Grundy in The Batman episode "Grundy's Night").
- September 11: Kristy McNichol, American former actress (voice of the Princess in Aladdin and the Wonderful Lamp, Girl in Sub in the Extreme Ghostbusters episode "Dry Spell", Sgt. Angela "Angie" Romar in Invasion America).
- September 15: Scott McNeil, Australian-born Canadian actor (voice of Piccolo in Dragon Ball Z, Wolverine in X-Men: Evolution, Koga in Inuyasha, Voltar in League of Super Evil, Rath in Mummies Alive!, T-Bone in Extreme Dinosaurs, Ken and Blanka in Street Fighter, Van Hohenheim in Fullmetal Alchemist, Flam in My Little Pony: Friendship Is Magic, Ace the Bat-Hound in Krypto the Superdog, Señor Hasbeena in ¡Mucha Lucha!, Hermey and Yukon Cornelius in Rudolph the Red-Nosed Reindeer and the Island of Misfit Toys).
- September 19: Cheri Oteri, American actress and comedian (voice of Esther in Puppy Dog Pals, Miss Flapp in Bunsen Is a Beast, Doreen Nickle in The Ant Bully, Connie Carmichael in The Fairly OddParents, Gwendolyn Zapp in Big City Greens, Gingersnaps in The 7D, Helen Klench in Sit Down, Shut Up, Pauline Pappernacky in Home: Adventures with Tip & Oh, Lavina in the Hercules episode "Hercules and the Jilt Trip", Honey O'Houlihan in the Dan Vs. episode "The Cat Burgler").
- September 24: Nia Vardalos, Canadian actress, director, producer and screenwriter (voice of Angie Diaz in Star vs. the Forces of Evil, Selene in DuckTales, Julia Kapatelis in Wonder Woman: Bloodlines, Nemeny Neverwish in Charming).

=== October ===
- October 1: Hakeem Kae-Kazim, Nigerian-born English actor (voice of Krogan in Dragons: Race to the Edge, Simon in the Love, Death & Robots episode "Sonnie's Edge", T'Chaka in The Avengers: Earth's Mightiest Heroes episode "The Man in the Ant Hill", Ghrun Set in the Generator Rex episode "Riddle of the Sphinx", Connor in the Ben 10: Alien Force episode "Be-Knighted").
- October 2: Jeff Bennett, American voice actor (voice of the title character in Johnny Bravo, Dexter's dad in Dexter's Laboratory, Ace, Big Billy, Grubber, and other various characters in The Powerpuff Girls, Raj, Samson and Commander Hoo-Ha in Camp Lazlo, Brooklyn in Gargoyles, Kowalski in The Penguins of Madagascar, Mortimer Mouse in Mickey's Once Upon a Christmas, Mickey Mouse, and The Wonderful World of Mickey Mouse, Jonathan Long and the Huntsman in American Dragon: Jake Long, Joker and Captain Marvel in Batman: The Brave and the Bold, Lord Bravery, the Huntsman, Cave Guy, Candle Jack, and Waylon Jeepers in Freakazoid!, Zazu in The Lion Guard, Azmuth and Ghostfreak in Ben 10: Alien Force and Ben 10: Ultimate Alien, the Creeper in The New Batman Adventures episode "Beware the Creeper", Baron Von Steamer in Big Hero 6: The Series, continued voice of Mr. Smee and Merlin).
- October 11: Joan Cusack, American actress and comedienne (voice of Jessie in the Toy Story franchise, the Narrator in Peep and the Big Wide World, Abby Mallard in Chicken Little, Verushka in Hoodwinked Too! Hood vs. Evil, Mission Control Elf in Arthur Christmas, Red in The Stinky & Dirty Show, Mrs. Tammy Krum in Klaus, Widow Support Group Leader in the American Dad! episode "Widow's Pique", Glenda Wilkins in the Phineas and Ferb episode "Last Train to Bustville").
- October 13: T'Keyah Crystal Keymáh, American actress (voice of Bumblebee in Teen Titans, Roz in Waynehead, Aoogah in Tweety's High-Flying Adventure, Allie Langford / Nails in the Static Shock episode "Hard as Nails", Makeba in the Batman Beyond episode "Untouchable").
- October 14: Charles E. Bastien, Canadian animation director (PAW Patrol, The Magic School Bus, Little Bear, Braceface, Mike the Knight), (d. 2023).
- October 16: Flea, Australian-American musician, actor and member of the Red Hot Chili Peppers (voice of Edward Chang/Grunge in Gen^{13}, Donnie Thornberry, Poacher, Sea Lions, Hingah, Tom and Zebra in The Wild Thornberrys, The Milk Bandit in Sheriff Callie's Wild West, Roller Man in Stan Lee's Mighty 7, Mind Worker Cop Jake in Inside Out, Jordan's Fear in Riley's First Date?, Caboom TV Announcer in Toy Story 4, Ruff in Arlo the Alligator Boy and I Heart Arlo, Orderly in the American Dad! episode "Stan-Dan Deliver", himself in The Simpsons episode "Krusty Gets Kancelled", the Duckman episode "A Star is Abhorred", and the Family Guy episode "Peter's Def Jam", additional voices in The Lionhearts).
- October 17: Mike Judge, Ecuadorian-American animator and actor (creator of Beavis and Butt-Head, King of the Hill and The Goode Family, and voice of Beavis and Butt-Head in the former and Hank Hill in the latter).
- October 19: Evander Holyfield, American former professional boxer (voiced himself in the Phineas and Ferb episode "Raging Bully").
- October 22: Bob Odenkirk, American actor, comedian and filmmaker (voice of Winston Deavor in Incredibles 2, various characters in Tom Goes to the Mayor, Half Oldman Half Youngman and Senator Tinkerbell in Freak Show, The Devil in Hell and Back, The Interventionist and Bathroom Attendant in The Life & Times of Tim, Feather in Chicago Party Aunt, Chase in the Bob's Burgers episode "Tina-Rannosaurus Wrecks", Hot Sauce Worker in the TripTank episode "Crossing the Line", Mob Lawyer in The Simpsons episode "The Fat Blue Line", Brian Kennedy in The Goode Family episode "Pleatherheads", Vince the Circus Owner in the Glenn Martin DDS episode "The Grossest Show on Earth", Chaz in the Futurama episode "The Why of Fry", Bean Wizard in the Aqua Teen Hunger Force episode "Hypno-Germ", himself in the Dr. Katz, Professional Therapist episode "Fructose").
- October 26: Cary Elwes, English actor (voice of Garrett in Quest for Camelot, Francis in Felidae, Donald Curtis in Porco Rosso, Baron Humbert von Gikkigen in The Cat Returns and Whisper of the Heart, Aquaman in Justice League: The Flashpoint Paradox, Paris in the Hercules episode "Hercules and the Trojan War", Paxton Powers in the Batman Beyond episode "Ascension").
- October 28: Daphne Zuniga, American actress (voice of Vespa in Spaceballs: The Animated Series, Cinderella in the Happily Ever After: Fairy Tales for Every Child episode "Cinderella", Gabrielle in the Johnny Bravo episode "My Fair Dork", April in the Batman Beyond episode "April Moon").
- October 31: Don Asmussen, American cartoonist (Monkeybone), (d. 2021).

=== November ===
- November 1:
  - Anthony Kiedis, American singer, songwriter, and member of Red Hot Chili Peppers (voiced himself in The Simpsons episode "Krusty Gets Kancelled").
  - Brenda Chapman, American animator, storyboard artist, writer and director (Walt Disney Animation Studios, Pixar, DreamWorks Animation).
  - Lolita Ritmanis, American composer (Warner Bros. Animation, Avengers Assemble, Wacky Races).
- November 11: Demi Moore, American actress (voice of Esmeralda in The Hunchback of Notre Dame and The Hunchback of Notre Dame II, Dallas Grimes in Beavis and Butt-Head Do America).
- November 14:
  - Atsuko Tanaka, Japanese actress (voice of Motoko Kusanagi in the Ghost in the Shell franchise, Konan in Naruto, Caster in the Fate/stay night franchise, Lisa Lisa in JoJo's Bizarre Adventure, Claudette in Queen's Blade, Francis Midford in Black Butler, Karura in Utawarerumono, Bayonetta in Bayonetta: Bloody Fate, Hanami in Jujutsu Kaisen, Japanese dub voice of Botanica in Beast Machines: Transformers, Vanessa Fisk in Spider-Man: Into the Spider-Verse, Riley's Mother in Inside Out, Monkey and Sariatu in Kubo and the Two Strings), (d. 2024).
  - Harland Williams, Canadian actor, comedian and writer (voice of Newton in Ned's Newt, Mike in Gary & Mike, Lug in Robots, Carl in Meet the Robinsons, and Once Upon a Studio, Cecilia and Captain Frost in Jake and the Never Land Pirates, Apple in The High Fructose Adventures of Annoying Orange, Monster in Robot and Monster, Hugo in Skylanders Academy, Jeff Foxworthy in the Family Guy episode "To Love and Die in Dixie", George in the What's New, Scooby-Doo? episode "A Scooby-Doo Valentine", Hiram in the Dan Vs. episode "Dan Vs. Technology", Cornelius Quibblefingers in the Robot Chicken episode "The Departy Monster", Helper Hue in the Penn Zero: Part-Time Hero episode "It's a Colorful Life", Sandie the Sandman in The 7D episode "In Yer Dreams, Pal", Joe McGrath in the Be Cool, Scooby-Doo! episode "Vote Velma", Thomas Edison's Ghost in the Bunnicula episode "Indistinguishable from Magic", creator of and voice of Bob in Puppy Dog Pals).
  - Satomi Kōrogi, Japanese actress and singer (voice of Himawari Nohara in Crayon Shin-chan, Omni King in Dragon Ball Super, Menchi in Excel Saga, Japanese dub voice of Ducky in The Land Before Time franchise, Arnold Perlstein in The Magic School Bus, and Snarf in ThunderCats).
- November 16:
  - Darwyn Cooke, Canadian animator and comics artist (Warner Bros. Animation), (d. 2016).
  - Jin Yamanoi, Japanese actor (Japanese dub voice of Superman in DC League of Super-Pets, Poppa in The Good Dinosaur, Green Arrow in The Batman and Young Justice, and Starscream in Transformers: Animated).
- November 19: Jodie Foster, American actress (voice of Anne Chan in The Amazing Chan and the Chan Clan, Pugsley Addams in The New Scooby-Doo Movies episode "Wednesday is Missing" and The Addams Family, Maggie Roark in The Simpsons episode "Four Great Women and a Manicure", Queen Celeste in Hexed).
- November 28: Jon Stewart, American comedian, political commentator, and television host (voice of Godfrey in The Adventures of Tom Thumb and Thumbelina, Zeebad in Doogal, Jon in the Dr. Katz, Professional Therapist episode "Guess Who", Matt Tracker and Serpentor in the Robot Chicken episode "Executed by the State", Mr. Random in the Phineas and Ferb episode "The Klimpaloon Ultimatum", Judge Meow in the Gravity Falls episode "Weirdmageddon 2: Escape from Reality", himself in the American Dad! episode "Irregarding Steve" and The Simpsons episode "E Pluribus Wiggum").

=== December ===
- December 4: Julie Lemieux, Canadian actress (voice of Paisley Paver in Wild Kratts, the title character in Rupert, Russ in The Busy World of Richard Scarry, Warren Patterson in Monster by Mistake, Mrs. Gorf in Wayside, Fnuzzy Snuggums in Spliced, Cali in PAW Patrol).
- December 9:
  - Leslie Carrara-Rudolph, American puppeteer (Muppets Tonight, The Wubbulous World of Dr. Seuss, Sesame Street), performer, singer, artist and actress (voice of Wendy White in Poochini, Hana Takamine in Zatch Bell!, Myron in All Grown Up!, Peg Puppy, Old Lady Sheep and Kangaroo Mom in T.U.F.F. Puppy, Gracie the Toad, Doris the Raccoon and Sadie in Nature Cat, Bubbles in Splash and Bubbles, Abby Cadabby in Mecha Builders, additional voices in Howl's Moving Castle).
  - Felicity Huffman, American actress (voice of Betty Director in Kim Possible, Nima in Choose Your Own Adventure: The Abominable Snowman, herself in the BoJack Horseman episodes "Stupid Piece of Sh*t" and "The Judge").
- December 11: Charlie Mackesy, British artist, illustrator, and author (The Boy, the Mole, the Fox and the Horse).
- December 13: David A. Goodman, American writer and producer (Scooby-Doo and the Witch's Ghost, Futurama, Family Guy, American Dad!).
- December 16: Rusty Mills, American animator and director (Warner Bros. Animation), (d. 2012).
- December 17: Ari Folman, Israeli film director, screenwriter, animator, and composer (Waltz with Bashir, The Congress).
- December 18:
  - Maiya Williams, American television writer (Rugrats, The PJs, Class of 3000, Futurama, The Ghost and Molly McGee).
  - James Sie, Chinese-American actor and author (voice of Jackie Chan in Jackie Chan Adventures, Master Monkey in Kung Fu Panda: Legends of Awesomeness, General Gum in King of the Hill, Ryan Choi / Atom in Batman: The Brave and the Bold, Cabbage Merchant in Avatar: The Last Airbender, Kwan in Danny Phantom, Wind Dragon in the Justice League Unlimited episode "Ultimatum").
- December 19: Jill Talley, American voice actress (voice of Nosey in Rocko's Modern Life, Karen in SpongeBob SquarePants, Nina J. Neckerly, Gretchen and Miss Mucus in Camp Lazlo, Rita Loud in The Loud House, Sarah Dubois in The Boondocks).
- December 21: Debbie Bader, American animator (Warner Bros. Animation, Nickelodeon, Curious George, The Tick).
- December 22: Ralph Fiennes, English actor (voice of Alfred Pennyworth in The Lego Batman Movie, Rameses in The Prince of Egypt, Moon King in Kubo and the Two Strings, Victor Quartermaine in Wallace & Gromit: The Curse of the Were-Rabbit, Charles Cornwallis in the Liberty's Kids episode "Yorktown").
- December 23: Peter Ramsey, American film director, producer, and animator (Spider-Man: Into the Spider-Verse, Rise of the Guardians).
- December 31: Julian Stone, English actor, writer and producer (voice of Sir Raven, Pastor, Flamingo and Man in The Grim Adventures of Billy & Mandy, Old Worlder in Missing Link, Dandy Dan in the Handy Manny episode "Big Construction Job", additional voices in Steamboy and Toy Story That Time Forgot).

=== Specific date unknown ===
- Fernando Escandon, Mexican-American actor (voice of El Dorado in Super Friends, Don Toro in Jakers! The Adventures of Piggley Winks, Pirate in The Pagemaster, Dr. Salazer in The Real Adventures of Jonny Quest episode "The Mummies of Malenque", Cohila in the Extreme Ghostbusters episode "The Crawler", Professor Spinoza in The Wild Thornberrys episode "Blood Sisters"), (d. 2017).
- Bill Marsilii, American screenwriter (The Wubbulous World of Dr. Seuss, Courage the Cowardly Dog).
- Arne Olsen, Canadian screenwriter (All Dogs Go to Heaven 2), (d. 2026).
- Loyd Price, English animator (Wallace & Gromit, Shaun the Sheep, Chicken Run, The Pirates! In an Adventure with Scientists!, Early Man, Flushed Away), (d. 2026).

== Deaths ==
=== February ===
- February 6: Roy Atwell, American actor, comedian, and composer (voice of Doc in Snow White and the Seven Dwarfs), dies at age 83.
- February 17: Joseph Kearns, American actor (voice of the Doorknob in Alice in Wonderland), dies at age 55.
- February 22: Anson Dyer, English director, screenwriter, animator, and actor, (directed Adolf Hitler-themed animated short films for Gaumont-British, including The British Lion Awakes, Hitler On His Front Line, Hitler's Peace Pudding, Hitler Dances To Stalin's Tune, and Run, Adolf, Run), dies at age 86.
- February 24: Pete Peterson, American stop motion animator and special effects artist (Mighty Joe Young, The Black Scorpion, The Giant Behemoth), dies at age 58.

=== April ===
- April 18: Vyacheslav Levandovsky, Ukrainian animator, considered the founder of Ukrainian animation, (The Fairy Tale of the Straw Bull, The Tale about the Squirrel Hostess and the Mouse Villain, Tuk-Tuk and his friend Zhuk In the Land of Dolls), dies at age 65.
- April 21:
  - Bob Wickersham, American animator and comics artist (Walt Disney Company, Ub Iwerks, Fleischer Studios, Terrytoons, Warner Bros. Cartoons), dies at age 50.
  - Bob McCay, American cartoonist, illustrator, comic book colorist and inker, (assistant for his father Winsor McCay, he received sole credit for several of his father's cartoons, including an animated film), dies at age 65.
- April 24: Milt Franklyn, American composer and arranger (Looney Tunes), dies at age 64.

=== May ===
- May 23: Sterling Sturtevant, American designer and art director (Walt Disney Animation Studios, UPA), dies at age 39.
- May 27: Gwen Williams, American actress (voice of Mary in Mr. Bug Goes to Town), dies at age 74.

=== June ===
- June 2: Jules Luyckx, A.K.A. Julux, Belgian animator and comic artist (worked in the AFIM Studios, with Ray Goossens), dies at age 41 or 42 in an accident.
- June 6: Guinn "Big Boy" Williams, American actor (narrator in Mr. Bug Goes to Town), dies at age 63.
- June 19: Will Wright, American actor (voice of Friend Owl in Bambi), dies at age 68.

=== July ===
- July 23: Victor Moore, American actor (voiced himself in Friz Freleng's Daffy Duck short Ain't That Ducky), dies at age 86.

=== November ===
- November 8: Willis H. O'Brien, American special effects artist and animator (The Lost World, King Kong, The Son of Kong, Mighty Joe Young, The Black Scorpion, The Giant Behemoth), dies at age 76.

== See also ==
- 1962 in anime
