= Plantation Act =

Plantation Act may refer to:

- Plantation Act 1740 (1740), an act of the British Parliament on the American Colonies
- A Plantation Act (1926), an early sound film featuring Al Jolson
