= April Showers (song) =

1921 popular song introduced by Al Jolson

Song
- Written: 1921
- Published: Harms, Inc.
- Composer: Louis Silvers
- Lyricist: Buddy DeSylva

Audio sample
- Recording of April Showers, performed by Charles Harrison (1922): file; help

"April Showers" is a 1921 popular song composed by Louis Silvers with lyrics by B. G. De Sylva.

== History ==
The song was introduced in the 1921 Broadway musical Bombo, where it was performed by Al Jolson. It became a well-known Jolson standard: the first of his several recordings of the song was on Columbia Records in October 1921. It has also been recorded by many other artists.

Spike Jones and Doodles Weaver produced a parody that began with the lyrics: "When April showers, she never closes the curtain..."

The British comedians Morecambe and Wise performed a skit featuring the song, which involved a light sprinkling of water drizzling on straight man Ernie Wise whenever he sang it, but a bucket of water being thrown over Eric Morecambe whenever he did the same.

== Film appearances ==
- 1926 A Plantation Act sung by Al Jolson
- 1936 The Singing Kid sung by Al Jolson
- 1939 Rose of Washington Square sung by Al Jolson
- 1946 The Jolson Story sung by Al Jolson
- 1946 Margie sung by Jeanne Crain (dubbed by Louanne Hogan) and chorus
- 1948 April Showers
- 1949 Always Leave Them Laughing played at the Canal Street Boys Club and sung by Milton Berle.
- 1949 Jolson Sings Again sung by Al Jolson
- 1956 The Eddy Duchin Story
- 1962 Wet Hare sung by Mel Blanc as Bugs Bunny imitating Jolson
- 1987 The Brave Little Toaster sung by Jon Lovitz as Radio

== Recorded versions ==
- Victor Arden
- John Arpin
- Chris Barber - included in the album Chris Barber Plays - Vol. 2 (1956)
- Les Brown and His Band of Renown (1949)
- Carol Burnett
- Cab Calloway
- Steve Conway
- Bing Crosby (1956) (Songs I Wish I Had Sung the First Time Around) & (1977) (Seasons)
- Ruth Etting
- Arthur Fields (1922)
- Eddie Fisher (1954)
- Judy Garland - Judy (1956)
- Eydie Gorme - for her album Love Is a Season (1958)
- Ernie Hare (1922)
- Charles Harrison (1922)
- Ted Heath
- Woody Herman
- Joni James
- Al Jolson
  - (1921 Broadway Production)
  - Commercial recording October 21, 1921
  - (Performed by in 1926's A Plantation Act)
  - Commercial recording December 20, 1932 with Guy Lombardo and his Orchestra
  - (1936, in the film The Singing Kid)
  - Commercial recording August 10, 1945
  - (Re-recorded 1946, for the film The Jolson Story)
- Teddy Joyce and His Orchestra
- Teddi King - All The King's Songs (1959)
- Guy Lombardo and His Royal Canadians (vocal: Don Rodney) (1947)
- Abe Lyman and his California Orchestra (with vocals by Louis Rapp)
- Arthur Prysock
- The Original Rabbit Foot Spasm Band
- Jimmy Roselli
- Frank Sinatra
- Mel Tormé
- Tiny Tim
- Leslie Uggams
- Ian Whitcomb
- Paul Whiteman and his orchestra (instrumental) (1922)
- Margaret Whiting (1948)
- Jackie Wilson
- Kai Winding
- Isadora's sneakers sing the part of the song in a Sesame Street animation clip
- Bugs Bunny (voiced by Mel Blanc) in the Warner Bros. Cartoons animated short Wet Hare
- NRBQ

== Lyrics ==
Below are the lyrics of the 1921 version, which is out of copyright.

Verse 1
Life is not a highway strewn with flowers,
Still it holds a goodly share of bliss,
When the sun gives way to April showers,
Here is the point you should never miss.

Verse 2
Though April showers may come your way,
They bring the flowers that bloom in May,
So if it's raining have no regrets,
Because it isn't raining rain you know, it's raining violets.

Chorus
And where you see clouds upon the hills,
You soon will see crowds of daffodils,
So keep on looking for a bluebird,
And list'ning for his song,
Whenever April showers come along.
