= Monty Lopez =

American actor, businessman, and media personality (born 1975)

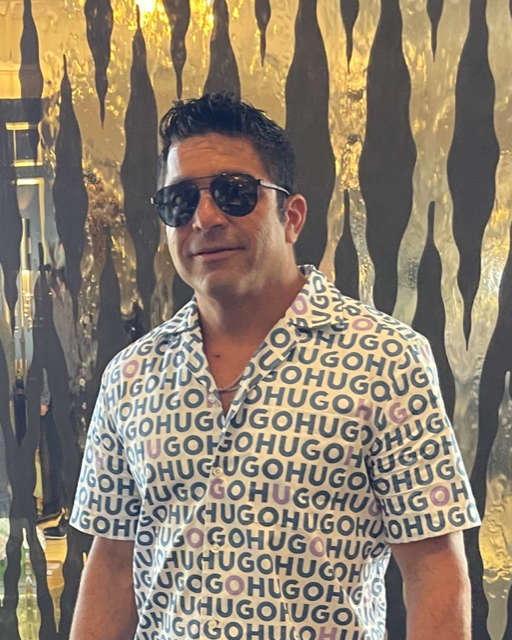
- Lopez in 2023
- Born: November 24, 1975 (age 50)
- Occupations: Actor; businessman; internet personality
- Years active: 2018–present
- Spouse: Sheri Nicole Easterling (m. 2004; div. 2017) (m. 2017; div. 2022)
- Children: 4, including Addison Rae

TikTok information
- Page: Monty
- Followers: 4.9 million

Monty Lopez (born November 24, 1975) is an American businessman and social media personality. He runs a real estate investment company named ML Sales.

== Career ==
Lopez acted in the movie Spy Cat in 2018 as Detective Mitsu. He also starred in the Snapchat series Addison Rae Goes Home. In January 2022, he signed to William Morris Agency as an actor.

== Filmography ==
Year	Film	Functioned as	Notes	Role
2018	Spycat	Actor	Voice of an animation character	Detective Mitsu

== Personal life ==
Lopez has four children, including singer and actress Addison Rae with ex-wife Sheri Easterling. He also has two grandchildren.
