= When the Red, Red Robin (Comes Bob, Bob, Bobbin' Along) =

1926 popular song

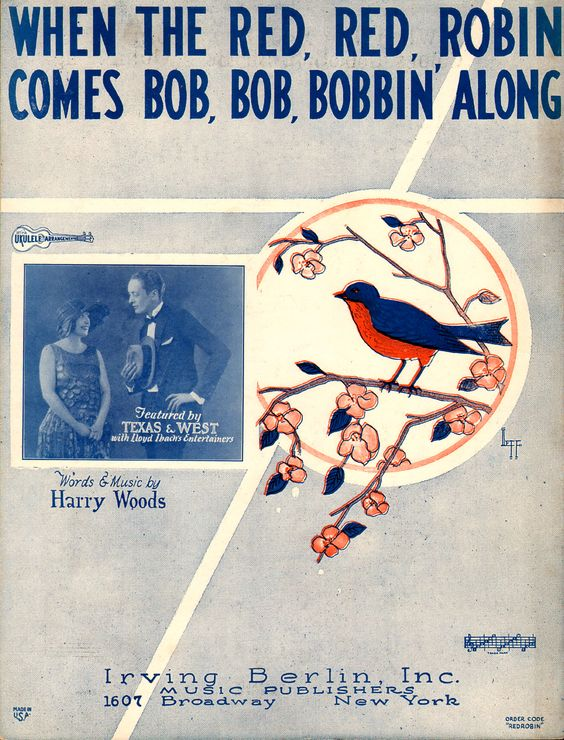
- Sheet music cover, 1926

Song
- Published: 1926 by Irving Berlin, Inc.
- Songwriter: Harry Woods

"When the Red, Red Robin (Comes Bob, Bob, Bobbin' Along)" is a popular song written, both words and music, by Harry Woods in 1926. The song became the signature song for singer and actress Lillian Roth, who performed it often during the height of her musical career from the late 1920s to the late 1930s.

== Notable recordings ==
The song was a hit in 1926 for: "Whispering" Jack Smith; Cliff Edwards; Paul Whiteman; and the band the Ipana Troubadors (vocal by Franklyn Baur). The most successful recording in 1926, however, was by Al Jolson. Jolson recorded it again on December 5, 1947, for Decca Records.

- 1939 Bob Crosby and His Orchestra – recorded April 7, 1939 for Decca Records (catalog No. 2537A).
- 1953 – recorded by Doris Day, and briefly reached the charts.
- 1956 Louis Armstrong and his All-Stars released a recording of the song
- 1956 Bing Crosby recorded the song for use on his radio show and it was subsequently included in the box set The Bing Crosby CBS Radio Recordings (1954-56) issued by Mosaic Records (catalog MD7-245) in 2009. Crosby also included the song in a medley on his album On the Happy Side (1962).
- 1957 Julie London – Julie.
- 1958 Eydie Gormé – Eydie Gormé Vamps the Roaring 20's.
- 1958 Carmen McRae – Birds of a Feather.
- 1973 Dean Martin – Sittin' on Top of the World.
- 1986 Sharon, Lois & Bram - Sharon, Lois & Bram's Elephant Show - Season 3, Episode "Topsy Turvy Elephant"
- 1996 Steve Goodman – The Easter Tapes (Live Steve Goodman album).
- 2002 Rosie Flores – The Bottle Let Me Down: Songs for Bumpy Wagon Rides (Various Artists).
- 2017 Kamasi Washington – Perspective (Harmony of Difference).

Also in the 1950s, a version was released by Peter Pan Records, with "Rock-a-Bye Your Baby with a Dixie Melody" on the reverse side of the single.

== Film appearances ==
- 1926 A Plantation Act – a sound-on-disc short film – sung by Al Jolson.
- 1932 When the Red, Red Robin Comes Bob, Bob, Bobbin' Along – a Fleischer Studios Screen Song cartoon.
- 1949 Jolson Sings Again – sung by Larry Parks (dubbed by Al Jolson)
- 1952 Has Anybody Seen My Gal? – sung by Lynn Bari, Gigi Perreau and Charles Coburn.
- 1955 I'll Cry Tomorrow – sung by Susan Hayward, playing Lillian Roth, in this biographical film about Roth.
- 1974 The Conversation – sung by Cindy Williams' character, Ann, during a conversation.

== In popular culture ==
The song featured an early example of the motivational three-word phrase "Live, Laugh, Love", that became a popular slogan on motivational posters and home decor in the late 2000s and early 2010s.

The song helped inspire the name of the American casual dining restaurant chain Red Robin: the owner of the original restaurant, in the University District of Seattle, sang in a barbershop quartet which frequently sang the song, and in the 1940s he renamed his restaurant "Sam's Red Robin".

The English football club Charlton Athletic play Billy Cotton's version of the song as the team come out on to the pitch at their home ground The Valley.

The English rugby league club Hull Kingston Rovers, who play traditionally in white jerseys with thick red bands, adopted the song as their club anthem after gaining the nickname 'The Robins'. In December 1983, local artist Pete Smith and the Hull Kingston Rovers squad recorded a version of the song incorporating a new verse, which was released in February 1984 in aid of player Roy Holdstock's testimonial year, and is still used by the club to this day; in 2026, Hull Kingston Rovers released an away shirt commemorating 100 years since the song was written.

This song was the basis for a 1932 Screen Songs animated short by Fleischer Studios.

In the 1957 Academy Award winning Looney Tunes cartoon Birds Anonymous, when Sylvester the Cat tries to fight his urge to eat Tweety by listening to music on the radio, he learns from the DJ that they'd just finished playing "Bye Bye Blackbird" and would follow it with "When The Red, Red Robin (Comes Bob, Bob, Bobbin' Along)" (both songs being bird themed songs), making him turn off the radio instead.

From Sesame Street, Robin says the title of the song during the end of the Elmo's World episode "Birds" before she leaves out the window.

The song is sung by the title character in the final episode of Reilly, Ace of Spies.

In the Season 3 episode of I Love Lucy titled "Lucy and Ethel Buy the Same Dress" (1953), a portion of the song is sung by Fred and Ethel Mertz (William Frawley and Vivian Vance).

In the season 2 episode 5 of Ally McBeal, Vonda Shepard performed a cover of this song.

Rosemary Clooney performs the song in an episode of her 1956–1957 television series.
