= Michael James Snyder =

American business executive

Michael J. Snyder
- Born: February 24, 1950
- Died: December 2, 2018 (aged 68); Yakima County, Washington, U.S.
- Occupation: Investor
- Known for: former CEO of Red Robin

Michael James Snyder (February 24, 1950 – December 2, 2018) was an American business executive, who is best known for having been the first franchisee of the Red Robin restaurant chain. He was later named president, CEO, and chairman of the board of the company.

== Early life ==
Snyder took his first job in the food industry in his grandfather's wholesale bakery as a young boy, and worked in the bakery throughout his childhood. He attended the University of Puget Sound, graduating in 1972 with a bachelor's degree in finance.

== Business career ==
In 1979 Snyder and his brothers, Steve Snyder and Brad Snyder, became the first franchisees of the Red Robin hamburger restaurant, officially turning the restaurant into a chain. In 1989 he then opened the first out of state restaurant in Boise, Idaho. The brothers would then open 14 restaurants in Colorado, Idaho, and Washington over the years, with annual revenues of over $40 million per year by the mid-1990s. The restaurants are operated by an organization called The Snyder Group. The franchisor company had been sold by its original owners to a Japanese company previously however the company had not been doing well. In response, Snyder, as a franchisee, went to Tokyo to present the parent company with a new business plan, and returned the new COO and president of the company in 1998.

Next Michael Snyder was promoted to CEO. In 1994 he moved the company's headquarters from California to Denver, Colorado and in 1991 he was made chairman of the board.

In 2009 Snyder merged his franchise company with the franchisor Red Robin company, forming the Red Robin Gourmet Burgers company. Since Snyder took the reins in 1996, the company experienced twenty-four consecutive quarters of growth. During this period, Snyder grew the number of restaurants by, with average sales per restaurant increasing by over 50%. He then took the company public in 2002. About half the company's restaurants at this point were company owned, with the other half being franchised. He also developed the company's business model of what the company and the press called "unbridled service", which encourages employees to act beyond their scope in bringing enjoyment to customer experiences and take advantage of situations to go beyond their usual job in making diners happy. Red Robin was named the restaurant chain of the year in 2005 by Restaurant Hospitality, which had previously written that the success of Red Robin was due directly to Snyder's leadership. Snyder left his positions with the company late that year amid allegations of fraud, which led to a SEC investigation and settlement and shareholders lawsuit, but up until his death in December 2018 remained the largest individual shareholder in the company, having held a 6.6% ownership stake. At the time of his death he was also the Managing Partner of Calliope Investment Company LLC.

== Death ==
Snyder committed suicide by gunshot on December 2, 2018, in Yakima County, Washington. He was 68.
