= Red Robin =

American casual dining restaurant chain

Red Robin Gourmet Burgers, Inc.

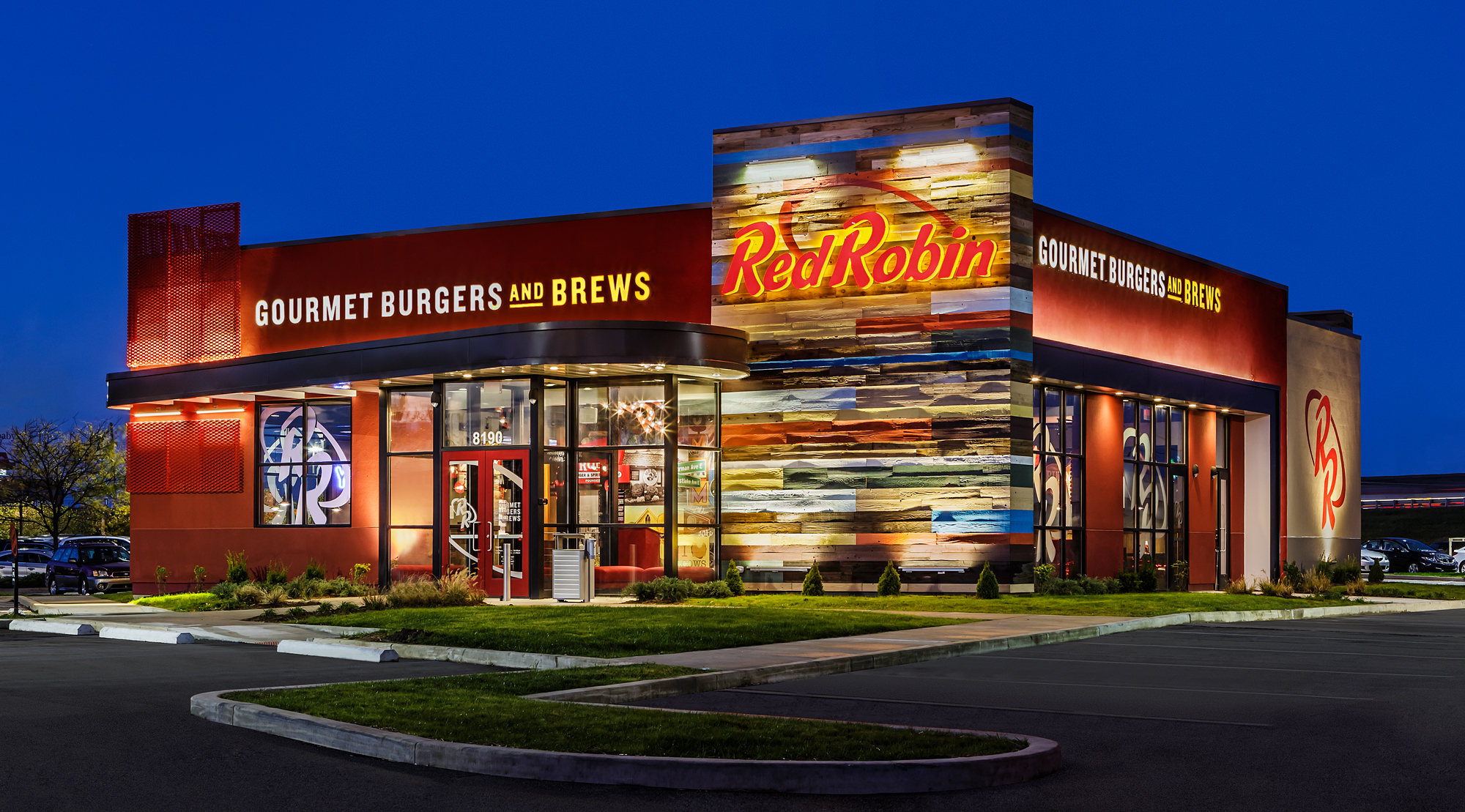
- A Red Robin restaurant in 2015
- Trade name: Red Robin Gourmet Burgers and Brews
- Formerly: Sam's Tavern (1940–1942); Sam's Red Robin; (1942–1969)
- Type: Public
- Traded as: Nasdaq: RRGB; Russell 2000 component
- Industry: Restaurant
- Genre: Casual dining
- Founded: 1940; 86 years ago in Seattle, Washington, U.S. (as Sam's Tavern); 1969; 57 years ago (as Red Robin)
- Founder: Gerry Kingen
- Headquarters: Tuscany Plaza; 6312 S Fiddlers Green Circle, Suite 200 Greenwood Village, Colorado, 80111, United States
- Number of locations: 506 (2023)
- Area served: United States; Canada
- Key people: David A. Pace (CEO); Todd Wilson (CFO); Sarah Mussetter (CLO); Kevin Mayer (CMO); Jason Rusk (CBDO); Jyoti Lynch (CTO)
- Products: Burgers; chicken; french fries; sandwiches; appetizers; desserts; milkshakes; salads; soups; alcoholic beverages; soft drinks
- Revenue: ▲US$1.002 billion (FY February 25, 2021)
- Net income: ▲US$276.07 million (FY February 25, 2021)
- Website: redrobin.com

Red Robin Gourmet Burgers, Inc., (Note: It is more commonly known as Red Robin Gourmet Burgers and Brews, operating under Red Robin International, Inc., and originally known as Sam's Tavern and Sam's Red Robin) or simply known as Red Robin, is an American chain of casual dining restaurants originally founded in 1940 in Seattle, Washington. In 1979, the first franchised Red Robin restaurant was opened in Yakima, Washington. Red Robin's headquarters is in Greenwood Village, Colorado. As of December 2024, the company operated a total of 498 restaurants, with 91 being operated as a franchise. Ever since 1969, their menu specializes in classic American fare, such as burgers, french fries (which are often endless), and appetizers, though it has also expanded to include chicken sandwiches, pizza, salads, and other foods.

== History ==
The first Red Robin was located at the corner of Furhman and Eastlake Avenues E. in Seattle, at the southern end of the University Bridge. This building dated from 1916 as a grocery store and was later converted into a restaurant in the 1920s; it was owned by 12 properties and known by various names. It was renamed to Sam's Red Robin Tavern in 1942, allegedly by owner Samuel Caston, who sang in a barbershop quartet and could frequently be heard singing the song "When the Red, Red Robin (Comes Bob, Bob, Bobbin' Along)".

In 1969, local Seattle restaurant entrepreneur Gerry Kingen bought and expanded the restaurant. The business dropped the "Sam's" and became Red Robin. The first restaurant was 1,200 sq ft (110 m^{2}). It was a favored hangout for University of Washington students. Kingen continued to operate the location as a tavern for a few years, but later added hamburgers to the menu, eventually giving fans 28 different burgers to choose from, and sales increased.

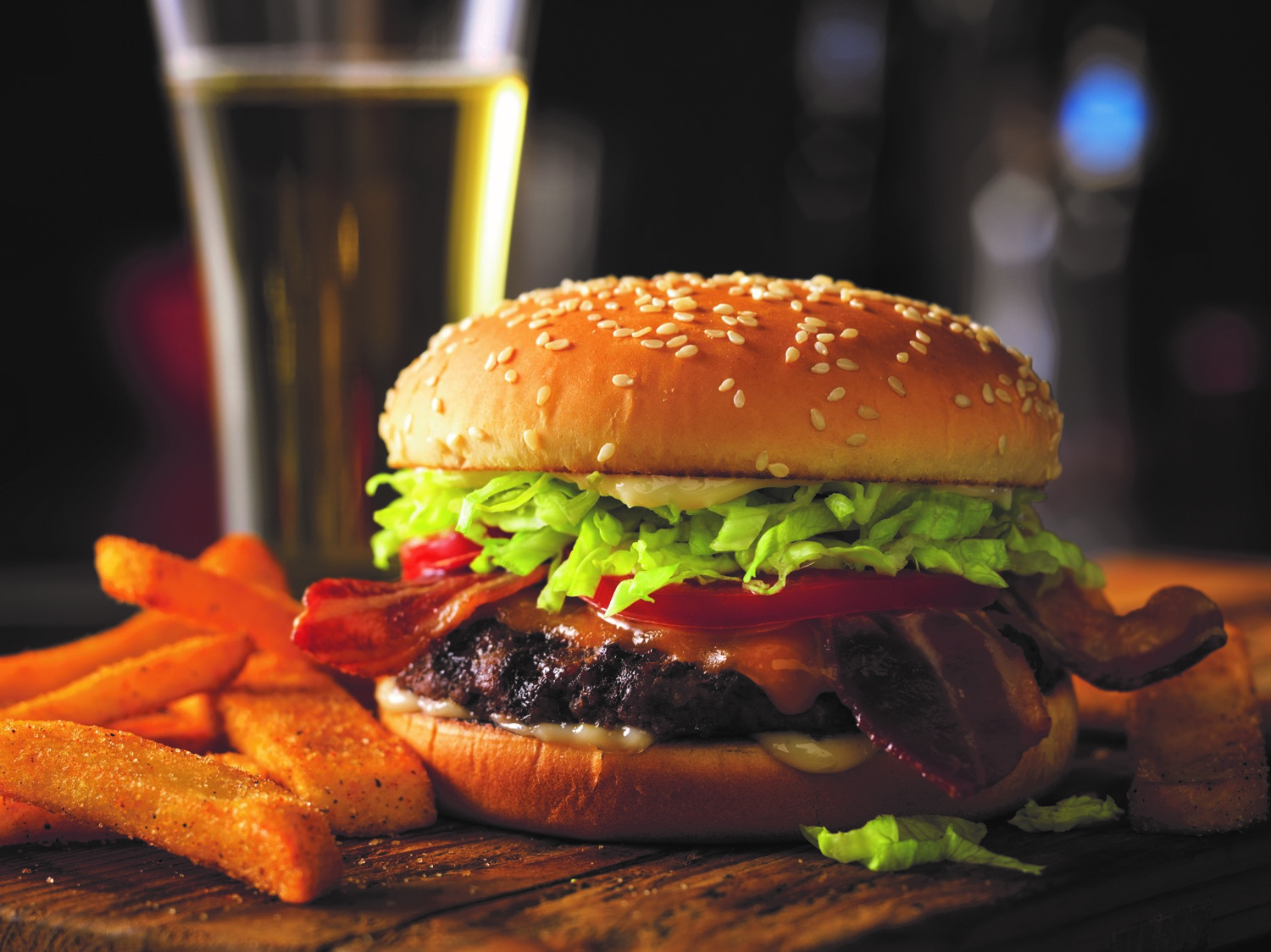
Red Robin's Gourmet Bacon Cheeseburger

After ten years of building the Red Robin concept, Kingen decided to franchise it, which proved to be significant in the development of the chain. The chain drew its strength through franchising and through one franchisee in particular. Kingen's association with the company he founded later ended, but the franchising system endured.

In 1979, Kingen sold Michael and Steve Snyder the rights to open a Red Robin in Yakima, Washington, and The Snyder Group Company became Red Robin's first franchisee. In 1980, Red Robin opened a restaurant in Portland, Oregon. In 1983, Red Robin adopted a mascot named Red. In 1985, Red Robin had 175 restaurants when the corporate headquarters was moved from downtown Seattle to Irvine, California after CEO Kingen sold a controlling interest in Red Robin Corp. to Skylark Corporation of Japan and where Michael Snyder had Red Robin offices. With marginal successes and poor financial performance under Skylark's management, Kingen, then a minority owner, in 1995 stepped back into Red Robin with Michael Snyder. In 2000, the company opened its 150th restaurant. The headquarters were moved to the Denver Tech Center. In 2000, Red Robin merged with the Snyder Group, and Snyder became the company's president, chairman, and CEO. Snyder took the company public in 2002. In 2005, Snyder was ousted as CEO after allegations of fraud, which led to a SEC investigation and settlement and shareholders' lawsuit.

The first Red Robin in the Chicago area opened in January 2001 at Woodfield Mall in Schaumburg, Illinois. Additional locations opened in Warrenville and Wheaton that year.

The original Red Robin closed on March 21, 2010, due to prohibitive maintenance costs for the old building. It was demolished on August 28, 2014, to make way for a three-story residential building named the "Robin's Nest".

As of the fiscal year 2015, the company had 538 restaurants with a revenue of $1.25 billion. To expand their reach, Red Robin added a "simplified" line of restaurants called Red Robin's Burger Works featuring quick service and with locations in Washington, D.C., Illinois, Ohio, and Colorado. These restaurants, launched in 2011, were mostly closed in 2016; three were rebranded as Red Robin Express to differentiate them from full-service locations.

On December 2, 2018, Michael Snyder died by suicide. In September 2019, Paul J.B. Murphy III was appointed president, Chief Executive Officer, and a member of the company's board of directors, effective October 3, 2019. The following month, the company announced plans to close its five locations in Alberta, Canada in the Edmonton area by early December.

In 2021, Red Robin refocused its efforts on growth in its home state of Washington, opening a new location in Federal Way, Washington on November 15. The following November, the company closed its location in Baton Rouge, Louisiana and finished pulling all of its locations out of the Boston area.

In February 2025, Red Robin announced plans to close approximately 70 underperforming locations over the next five years to repay debt, with 10 to 15 closures expected in 2025.

In May 2025, Red Robin introduced a Burger Pass promotion, offering a daily burger and side for $20 during the month. The promotion caused website issues due to high traffic, leading to customer complaints.

== See also ==
- List of casual dining restaurant chains
- List of hamburger restaurants
