= Bill of Hare =

1962 film

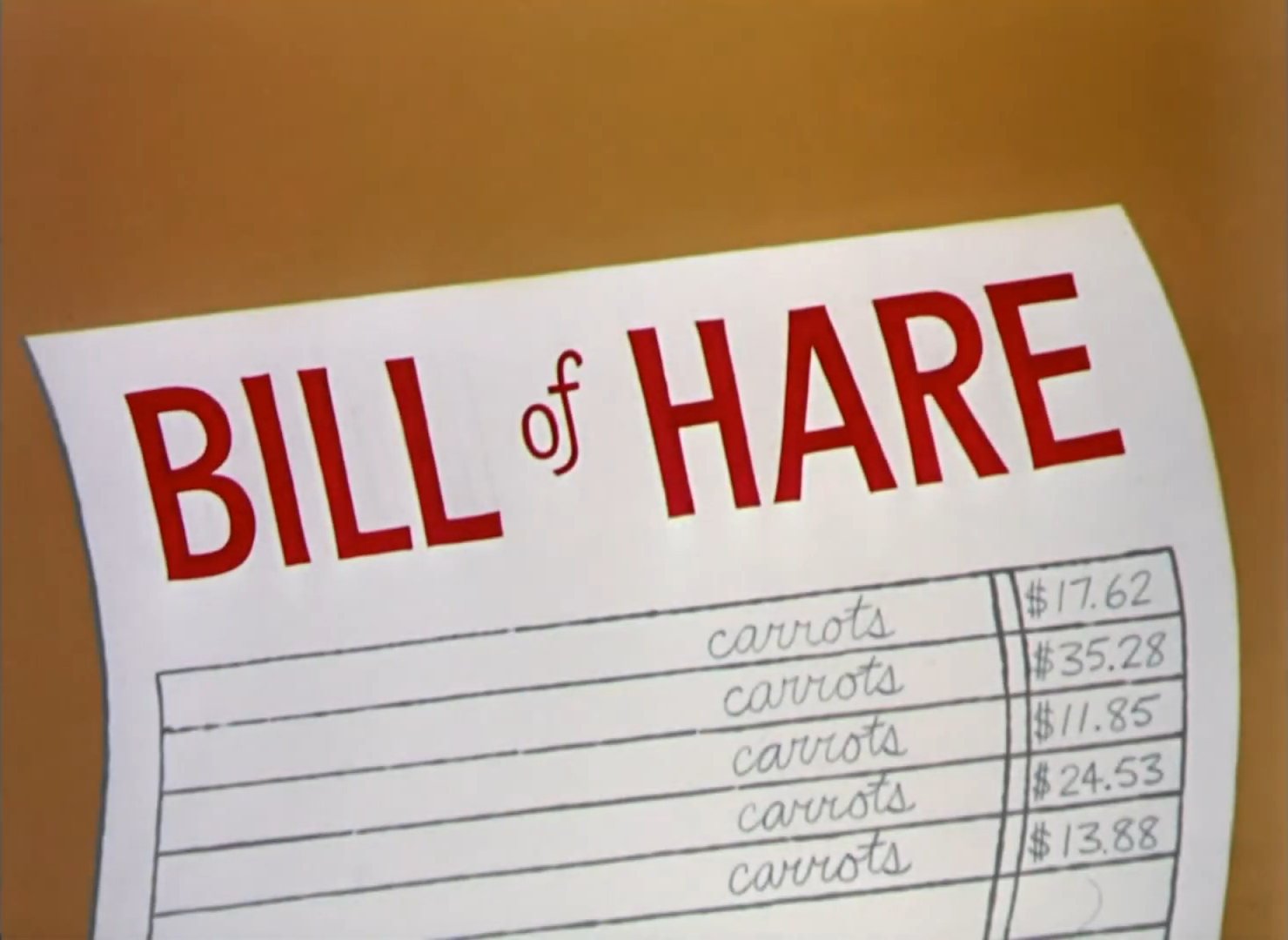
- Title card
- Directed by: Robert McKimson
- Story by: John Dunn
- Starring: Mel Blanc
- Edited by: Treg Brown
- Music by: Milt Franklyn
- Animation by: Ted Bonnicksen; Warren Batchelder; George Grandpré; Keith Darling
- Layouts by: Robert Gribbroek
- Backgrounds by: Robert Gribbroek
- Color process: Technicolor
- Production company: Warner Bros. Cartoons
- Distributed by: Warner Bros. Pictures
- Release date: June 9, 1962
- Running time: 6:25
- Language: English

Bill of Hare is a 1962 Warner Bros. Merrie Melodies cartoon directed by Robert McKimson. The short was released on June 9, 1962, and stars Bugs Bunny and the Tasmanian Devil.

== Plot ==
The cartoon opens in a seaside town where a crate is being unloaded from a cargo ship, belonging to the Snodgrass Scientific Expedition. The net holding the crate breaks, releasing the Tasmanian Devil. He also sank the ship and comes onshore and smells food being cooked. He sees Bugs Bunny under the pier trying to cook a meal in a kettle. Taz throws Bugs into the pot, but Bugs tricks him into switching places. Bugs puts the pot inside a cannon and fires it like a cannonball into the ocean.

Bugs is next seen using a rotisserie to roast carrots over an open fire. Taz ties Bugs to the rotisserie until it is revealed that he is really turning the crank of the truck engine. Taz is run over by the truck and Bugs escapes once again.

Bugs convinces Taz that his only food source is a moose. They go to a train tunnel, which Bugs is passing off as a moose cave. In trying to catch a moose, Taz gets run over twice by trains and once by Bugs, riding a moose.

Taz corners Bugs again but Bugs tricks Taz by assuming a disguise as a waiter in a restaurant and feeding him a skewer with three lit dynamite sticks. The dynamite blows up in Taz's stomach, and Taz chases Bugs, ending with Taz trapped in a cage, and taken to the city zoo.

The final scene shows Taz in the zoo's cage, and Bugs is the zookeeper, who offers lunch to Taz that is under Bugs' "supervision", to which Taz rejects and reveals a sign that says "Please Do Not Feed the Animals". Bugs finally remarks, "Well what do you know, I'd never thought he'd lose his appetite".

== Crew ==
- Story: John Dunn
- Animators: Warren Batchelder, Keith Darling, Ted Bonnicksen, George Grandpre'
- Layout and background artist: Robert Gribbroek
- Editor: Treg Brown
- Voices: Mel Blanc
- Music: Milt Franklyn
- Producer: David H. DePatie
- Director: Robert McKimson

Preceded by Wet Hare	Bugs Bunny Cartoons; 1962	Succeeded by Shishkabugs
