= Balance (1989 film) =

- Directed by: Christoph Lauenstein; Wolfgang Lauenstein
- Distributed by: Material-Verlag
- Release date: 1989
- Running time: 7 minutes
- Country: Germany

Balance is a 1989 German surrealist experimental independently-produced stop-motion animated film directed and produced by twin brothers Wolfgang and Christoph Lauenstein.

== Plot ==
The film depicts five individuals standing on a small platform floating in an empty space. These men are all identical apart from a number on the back of their coats: 23, 35, 51, 75, and 77. Whenever one of them moves, the platform tilts and the others must move as well to ensure that the platform does not tip over. They all move to the side of the platform, take out fishing rods, and cast their lines over the edge. The one numbered 51 reels in a large, heavy box while the others scramble to the opposite side of the platform. One by one, the individuals inspect the box. The box has a wind-up key which causes it to play music, but at such a low volume that only the closest man can hear it. As each man in turn moves to inspect the box, the platform becomes unstable, prompting the whole group to converge in the center to stop the platform from tipping over. The man with the number 75 attempts to tip the box over the edge, but number 51 counterbalances the platform to prevent it. These two scuffle briefly, causing the box to slide to number 23, who tap dances to the tune as the others look on. 75 moves away from the center of gravity, tipping the platform and causing the box to slide toward him, but 23 sits on top of the box and moves with it.

The added weight moves the box to the very edge of the platform. The others rearrange themselves to bring the box back to the center. Riding the box as it moves from side to side, 23 pushes 35 off the platform as the former slides to the edge. The others rearrange themselves again to compensate for the loss of mass. 51 trips and falls over. 75 shoves 77 to the ground as he avoids the careening 23. 77 scrambles to the opposite edge as 23 moves with the box again. 23 kicks 75 off the platform, unbalancing it and causing 77 to fall over the edge. 23 gets off the box, approaches 51 and kicks him over the edge. Now alone, 23 turns around to look at the box, which is perched on the edge furthest from him. Without the others, 23 has to maintain the balance on his own, keeping the box out of reach. One step back and he falls, one step forward and the box falls. He can only watch as the box slowly winds down and plays its music, which 23 is unable to hear.

== Legacy ==
Balance was commissioned by German group Alphaville as part of their Songlines project for their 1989 album The Breathtaking Blue. For Songlines, the video was set to the song "Middle of the Riddle" from that album. Lauenstein said of the video, "its visualization is not a literal illustration [of the song], which would be impossible in any case, but comprises a complete, autonomous story on its own."

=== Accolades ===
Set to different music, Balance won the Academy Award for Best Animated Short in 1989.
