= Luis and the Aliens =

2018 German computer-animated comedy film

- German theatrical release poster
- Directed by: Christoph Lauenstein; Wolfgang Lauenstein
- Written by: Christoph Lauenstein; Wolfgang Lauenstein
- Music by: Ingmar Suberkrub; Martin Lingnau
- Production companies: Ulysses Films; Fabrique D'Images; A-Film APS
- Distributed by: 20th Century Fox (Germany)
- Release dates: 22 March 2018 (Luxembourg City Film Festival); 24 May 2018 (Germany)
- Running time: 86 minutes
- Countries: Germany; Luxembourg; Denmark
- Language: English
- Box office: $12.6 million

Luis and the Aliens is a 2018 English-language animated science-fiction comedy film written and directed by Christoph and Wolfgang Lauenstein, and co-directed by Sean McCormack. The film premiered at the Luxembourg City Film Festival on 2 March 2018 and was released in Germany on 24 May 2018, North America on 17 August, and the UK on 24 August 2018. A spin-off sequel film Lille Allan - Den Mennesklige Antenna was released in 2022.

== Plot ==
On his 12th birthday, Luis has no friends, and his father, the ufologist Armin Sonntag, constantly does not have enough time for him. He does not even know that those whom he is so eager to find are right in front of his nose. On his birthday, Luis becomes the only witness to the crash landing of three aliens near their home. They have a special ability - eat people hair to transform into anything they want. Luis had never had more fun than being around them. But he quickly realizes that if his father finds out about his secret, it will not end well. He decides to help them fix their mothership and fly away with them to the Winters' house.

Marlon later takes the family's SUV. As the rest of his family returns from his younger sister's play, Armin Sontag walks in and tries to force them to assume the guise of aliens. But after the words of their neighbor, Armin Sonntag, Mr. Winters and Ms. Jade Dieckendacker) set off in pursuit in a courier van.

On the way, Luis reveals the truth to Marlon - in fact, the aliens are traveling with them with Marlon, from which he almost broke the sack. After arriving at Dragon's Peak, the aliens and Luis prepare to take off back to her mothership that hovers over the peak. Soon the others arrive there. At the last moment, Ms. Dieckendacker takes away Armin Sonntag's homemade freezer gun, as Luis tries to stop her but falls off a cliff. The monster and prepares to shoot Luis, but is stopped by Agent Stu who is a member of the Intergalactic Police that was disguised as an ice cream man. Suddenly, Dieckendacker transforms into a large dinosaur-like creature called Tontonian. Luis emerges from under the pushed stone. He runs away from the Tontonian, who falls off a cliff. Luis negotiates a plan with Wabo, Nag and Mog. In the course of a difficult duel in which the three aliens pretend to be Luis, gradually leading the Tontonian to the real Luis, who is quickly frozen by him. After that, Stu later sends Dieckendacker to his cooling house, and the aliens take the "NubbiDubbi" rug ordered by them and they go back to their mothership.

== Voice cast ==
- Callum Maloney as Luis Sonntag
- Dermot Magennis as Armin Sonntag and Wabo
- Ian Coppinger as Mog
- Paul Tylak as Mr. Winter, Ice Cream Man and Bill
- Will Forte as Nag
- Lucy Carolan as Jennifer Yeng
- Eoin Daly as Marlon Winter
- Aileen Mythen as Mrs. Winter, Valentina and Ms. Jade Diekendaker
- Simon Toal as the principal

== Release ==
The film had its premiere at the Luxembourg City Film Festival on 2 March 2018, and premiered in Germany at the Stuttgart Festival of Animated Film on 27 April. It was released in cinemas in Germany on 24 May, the US and Canada on 17 August and the UK on 24 August. The film grossed $12,632,840 worldwide.

While it received positive reviews in Europe, The film received generally negative reviews from American critics. On the review aggregator Rotten Tomatoes, the film holds an approval rating of 24% from 17 reviews, and on Metacritic it has a score of 46 out of 100 based on 4 reviews, indicating "mixed or average reviews".
