= Spy Cat =

- German theatrical release poster
- German: Marnie's Welt
- Directed by: Christoph Lauenstein; Wolfgang Lauenstein
- Written by: Christoph Lauenstein; Wolfgang Lauenstein
- Based on: "Town Musicians of Bremen" by Brothers Grimm
- Produced by: Jan Bonath; Mark Mertens
- Starring: Alexandra Neldel; Axel Prahl
- Music by: Andreas Radzuweit
- Production companies: Scopas Medien; Grid Animation; Philm CGI; SevenPictures Film GmbH; Schubert International Filmproduktions; UFA Fiction; Lauenstein & Lauenstein; Scope Pictures
- Distributed by: Universum Film (Germany); Global Screen (International)
- Release dates: June 13, 2018 (Annecy); April 18, 2019 (Germany); May 1, 2019 (Belgium)
- Running time: 84 minutes
- Countries: Germany; Belgium; Czechia; India
- Languages: English; German
- Box office: $3,440,104

Spy Cat, also known by its German name Marnie's World (German: Marnie's Welt), is a 2018 animated spy comedy film written and directed by brothers Christoph and Wolfgang Lauenstein. The film was loosely inspired by the German fairy tale "Town Musicians of Bremen". It is an international co-production between Scopas Medien, Grid Animation, Philm CGI, SevenPictures Film GmbH, Schubert International Filmproduktions, UFA Fiction, Lauenstein & Lauenstein and Scope Pictures. The film was distributed in Germany by Universum Film, while Global Screen handled worldwide rights to the film and Viva Kids distributed the film in America.

The film is about Marnie, a tabby cat spoilt by her owner, and her friends Elvis the pitbull, Eggbert the rooster and Anton the donkey.

== Plot ==
Set in a fictional town called Drabville, where animals and humans comes in all shapes and sizes and they all live together, an orange tabby cat named Marnie is spoiled by her mistress, a nurse named Rosalinde Sunshine. Marnie spends all day eating pastries and watching television since she is never allowed to go outside, yet she wishes to one day become a spy.

Paul, Rosalinde's brother, comes to visit pretending to be hurt. Paul is actually a robber, having robbed other countries from around the world (Including cities like Paris, Tokyo, London, Buenos Aires, and New York City), he and two other men steal paintings and other things from Drabville so he can sell them without anyone finding out. Marnie sees what Paul is up to and spies on him. When she takes his picture and refuses to give it to him, Paul tricks the cat into being gotten rid of by sending her away against Rosalinde's wishes. When the box containing Marnie falls out of the delivery truck, the cat finds herself in the middle of the road.

From there, she meets a rooster named Eggbert who's trying to get away from hens who want to make him into chicken soup for being irresponsible and a grumpy dog named Elvis who had been mistreated by many humans, including a pumpkin farmer who wants to kill him for his cowardice. Marnie tells Eggbert and Elvis what she's up to and they escape on Elvis' tractor. From there, they meet a donkey named Anton pretending to be a zebra so he can join a circus. The four animals drive away in a van belonging to Paul's men and rest for the night in an old abandoned barn while Rosalinde is shocked to find that Marnie is gone, but her brother doesn't tell her what actually happened while the police get a picture of the foursome, thinking they're the robbers.

The next day, Marnie discovers the stolen paintings and decides that she and her friends should take them to the police as evidence. But the cops think the animals are the burglars and chase them, unbeknownst to the real thieves while Rosalinde is grieved about her cat. After the foursome escapes ending up in a hayfield, it begins to rain and Anton's painted stripes wash off, which forces the donkey to confess who he really is. Marnie discovers the artist who painted the pictures and convinces her friends to return to Drabville so they find out about the artist. Anton distracts a fat woman by pretending to be a pizza delivery man while Marnie and Eggbert use the computer to look up the artist. Then they flee before the fat woman returns and Marnie then figures out where the thief will strike next.

The four heroes arrive at Eggbert's farm where they find out that Paul is the thief when Marnie takes his picture. The cat is shocked about this; and to make matters worse, Paul demands to be given the photo in exchange for Eggbert, whom he takes hostage. With Eggbert taken away, Elvis is angry at Marnie telling her that she'll never become a spy and the dog leaves for the dump while Anton unhappily heads off in another direction leaving Marnie alone to be put in solitary confinement at an animal shelter, much to Rosalinde's dismay.

Fortunately, Eggbert, Elvis, and Anton return to save Marnie, then all four of them return to Drabville knowing they might still have a chance to catch Paul. They distract him while calling the police using the TV, then lock Paul in Rosalinde's basement. When the nurse finds out about her brother's thievery, Paul escapes with the paintings in his flying wheelchair, but Rosalinde gets taken along for the ride. Anton, Elvis, Marnie, and Eggbert follow after them in an airplane to save Rosalinde and stop Paul when suddenly they crash land into a circus where the animals are proven innocent and Paul is arrested along with his men while Rosalinde apologizes to Marnie for the way she mistreated her.

The stolen paintings are returned to their owners and the animals are rewarded with money, but realizing what great team they make, they don't want to go their separate ways. So Eggbert, Elvis, Marnie, and Anton agree to stick together and bring more outlaws to justice everywhere they go as they set out for the open road in a special motor vehicle.

== Cast ==
- Alexandra Neldel in the original version, and Karoline Mask van Oppen in the English dub, as Marnie Sunshine, a pampered, orange tabby cat who becomes a spy as well as a detective in order to put an end to the robberies in Drabville. She loves watching police procedurals. Addison Rae voiced Marnie in the Viva Kids version of the film.
- Axel Prahl in the original version and Tom Zahner in the English dub, as Elvis, a whip-cracking, pessimistic and grumpy, brown and white pitbull who becomes Marnie's sidekick.
- Sylvain Urban in the original version, and Tony Clark in the English dub, as Eggbert, a native neurotic, joyful and spoiled, young white rooster who likes to make peace and becomes one of Marnie's heroes.
- Erik Borner in the original version, and Phil Lewis in the English dub as Anton, a heroic, talented donkey who wants to join a circus and joins Marnie's side. He even pretended to be a zebra, yet it is not known where he came from or who his owner was.
- Obada Adnan in the original version, and Phil Lewis in the English dub as Paul, Rosalinde's brother, a thief who has robbed many different countries all over the world and is now stealing paintings from Drabville, so now it is up to the animals to stop him.
- Manon Kahle as Rosalinde Sunshine, Paul's sister and Marnie's mistress who is overprotective of her cat and treats her like a baby until Marnie and her friends catch Paul.
- Monty Lopez as Detective Mitsu, a police officer from the Drabville police station. He and the other cops mistake the animals for thieves until they capture Paul.

== Release ==
Spy Cat received its worldwide premiere at the Annecy International Animation Film Festival on 13 June 2018. Long after, the film was theatrically released in Portugal on 14 March 2019. It was later released in Germany on 18 April 2019 by Universum Film and in Belgium on 1 May 2019, as well. The film had a worldwide gross of $3,440,104, but while it was well received in Germany, it received generally negative reviews from American and British critics. Its television premiere of the film was on Sat.1.

For its British theatrical release, in order to receive a U rating from the British Board of Film Classification, the film was edited to remove a comical scene of a man urinating against another man accidentally when he's distracted. An uncut PG classification was available.

An English dubbed version of Spy Cat was released on August 13, 2020 on DirecTV and on Digital and on Demand on September 11, 2020 by Viva Kids, with influencer Addison Rae now voicing the character of Marnie.
