= The Original Rabbit Foot Spasm Band =

- Origin: Oxford, England
- Genres: Blues, calypso
- Years active: 2006–present
- Label: Jump Steady
- Members: Stuart Macbeth; Michael "Red" Wilkins; Buzz Booker; Martin Watermelon "Carlo Matassa"; John "Skippy" Gannon

The Original Rabbit Foot Spasm Band is a seven-piece blues rhythm and blues band based in Oxford, England. The band play original material influenced by 1920s and 1930s jazz and 1940s jump blues. The band has been cited for its "extraordinary enthusiasm" and "pulling in fans who would never otherwise contemplate dancing to a jazz band". They alternate between raucous club and festival sets and recently featured on Mark Lamarr's BBC Radio 2 programme, God's Jukebox.

== Band members ==
- "Baron" Stuart Macbeth (bandleader, vocals, piano, kazoo, composer/arranger)
- Martin Watermelon (trumpet, vocals)
- "Red" Wilkins (tenor sax)
- "Carlo Matassa" (guitar/mandolin)
- Buzz Booker (double bass)
- John "Skippy" Gannon (drums)

== Former members ==
- David “Lucky” Nickerson (drums)

== History ==
The band was founded by "Baron" Stuart Macbeth as a proper three piece spasm band playing jazz and skiffle on homemade banjos, ukuleles and washboards. Their first performance was at the Hollybush Inn in Oxford on 21 October 2006, advertised as "Banjo Madness". By 2007 the band had begun to shift away from skiffle and more firmly towards blues and jazz. The instrumentation of the band began to reflect this change with the addition of bass and drums and a horn section. The band's repertoire is now made up exclusively of original compositions by Macbeth.

In February 2009 the band played a gig at Oxford's Wheatsheaf pub which met with a favourable review in Oxford's Nightshift magazine. Oxford Music Scene described their performance at the OX4 Festival that summer as "completely brilliant" and "a breath of fresh air".

They have played at Glastonbury Festival, The Royal Albert Hall, Ronnie Scotts, and the Royal Festival Hall and released a single on wax cylinder. One of the highlights of their schedule is their annual Christmas headline show at the O2 Academy in Oxford.

Macbeth discussed the origin of the band's name in a 2009 interview:

"Many of our heroes, like Ma Rainey, Bessie Smith and Louis Jordan, started out with a black touring troupe called who used the Rabbit Foot in their name. Spasm bands in New Orleans in the 1890s made music out of homemade instruments, which is how we started out. The Original bit is just quite funny, and a little homage to a whole host of early Jazz bands who stuck that at the front of their name. Kid Creole had his Dr Buzzard's Original Savannah Band as well, and he was about as original as we are."

The band released their first album Year of the Rabbit on 3 February 2011, which was described as "a damn addictive ride from start to finish...vivid, fun and full of life". Their second album Party Seven was released on 16 September 2013 on the Jump Steady label. As a warm up for the album the band kicked off 2013 by launching their own brand of cider.
