= A Plantation Act =

1926 film

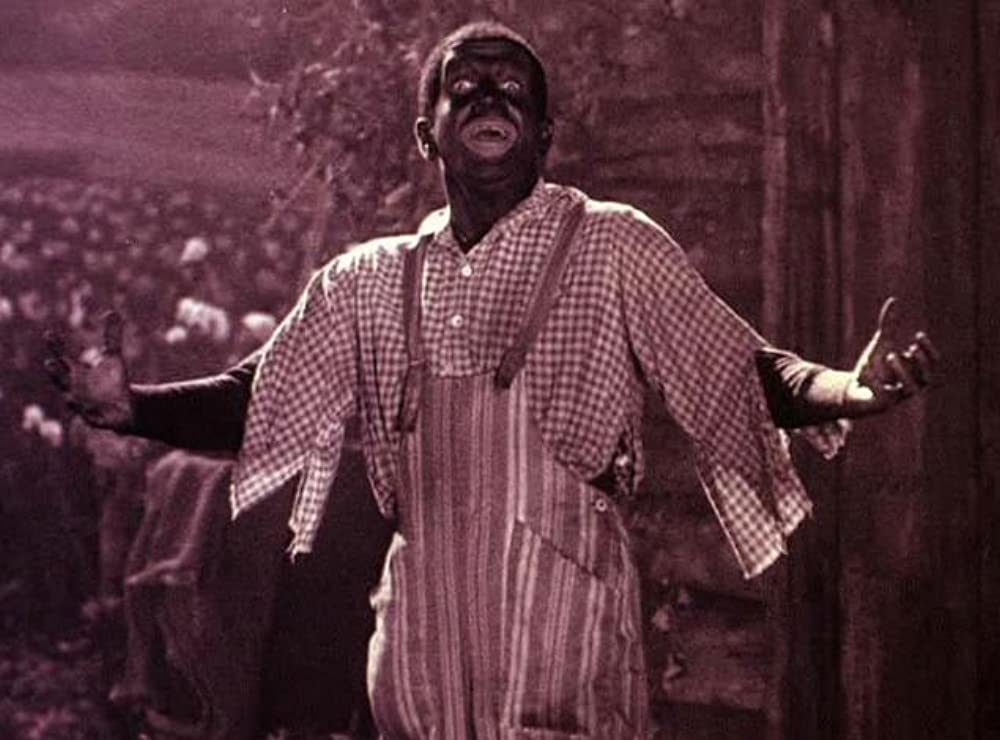
- Screenshot of Al Jolson in the film
- Directed by: Philip Roscoe (uncredited)
- Starring: Al Jolson
- Production company: Warner Bros. Pictures
- Distributed by: Warner Bros. Pictures
- Release date: October 7, 1926 (US)
- Running time: 10 minutes
- Country: United States
- Language: English

A Plantation Act (1926) is an early Vitaphone sound-on-disc short film starring Al Jolson, the first film that Jolson starred in. Jolson in blackface sings three of his hit songs: "April Showers", "Rock-a-Bye Your Baby with a Dixie Melody", and "When the Red, Red Robin (Comes Bob, Bob, Bobbin' Along)".

The film presents him as if in a live stage performance, complete with three curtain calls at the finish. Jolson is dressed as a plantation worker for the entirety of the short. The film features one set, that of a cabin with farmland behind it, and a cage with live chickens. Two fixed film cameras are used to give a wide shot and a medium shot of Jolson and the set.

== Premieres ==
The New York premiere was held at the Colony Theatre, New York, on October 7, 1926. A Plantation Act concluded a program of short subjects that accompanied Warner Bros.' second feature-length Vitaphone film The Better 'Ole. The "Intermission" card which appears at its end derives from that use.

The Hollywood premiere was held at showman Sid Grauman's Egyptian Theater on October 27, 1926. Grauman arranged for A Plantation Act to play as a companion to the Vitaphone success Don Juan starring John Barrymore. Columnist Gerald King recounted that Grauman "had done away with his usual prologue on the stage and would present instead, by means of Vitaphone, Al Jolson, the world's greatest entertainer. Grauman's first nights are a tradition, but the opening of Don Juan made Hollywood history. Every film executive and craftsman that could get into the theater was there for the premiere performance. They saw Don Juan and they heard Henry Hadley and the great orchestra that he leads. But above all they saw and heard and chuckled with Al Jolson as the great entertainer sang his songs and pulled off a few wisecracks." A 1946 article in Showmen's Trade Review confirmed that this was Sid Grauman's second premiere of Don Juan: he had been showing the silent version for two months, and wanted to surprise his audiences with the new sound version.

== Loss and rediscovery ==
The short was considered a lost film as far back as August 1933, when Jolson himself asked Warner Bros. to make a print for him as a personal souvenir, only to be disappointed. Historian Patrick Picking offers the details: "A Warner Brothers Studio letter, now in the Warner archives at USC, stated that 'As this short was made in 1926, there are no records or films available. We do not believe there is a print of this picture anywhere in the country.'" All that remained was its copyright registration, filed as "Al Jolson in A Plantation Act" on April 2, 1927.

The unavailability of A Plantation Act fueled the misconception that Jolson's first sound film was the famous feature-length milestone The Jazz Singer, which premiered almost exactly one year later. A mute print of A Plantation Act was eventually found in the Library of Congress, mislabeled as a preview for The Jazz Singer. A copy of the corresponding soundtrack disc also came to light in 1994, but it had been broken into four pieces and glued back together so imperfectly that it would not play through. After some careful surgery, restoration technicians succeeded in making a usable dub from the disc and digitally removing the pops and clicks resulting from the damage. The restored A Plantation Act film would be then showcased at UCLA's Seventh Annual Festival of Preservation in April 1995. The restored film was included on a laserdisc published in the 1990s and as a bonus feature on the 2007 3-disc DVD release of The Jazz Singer.

The full, public domain film

== See also ==
- Vitaphone Varieties
