= Wet Hare =

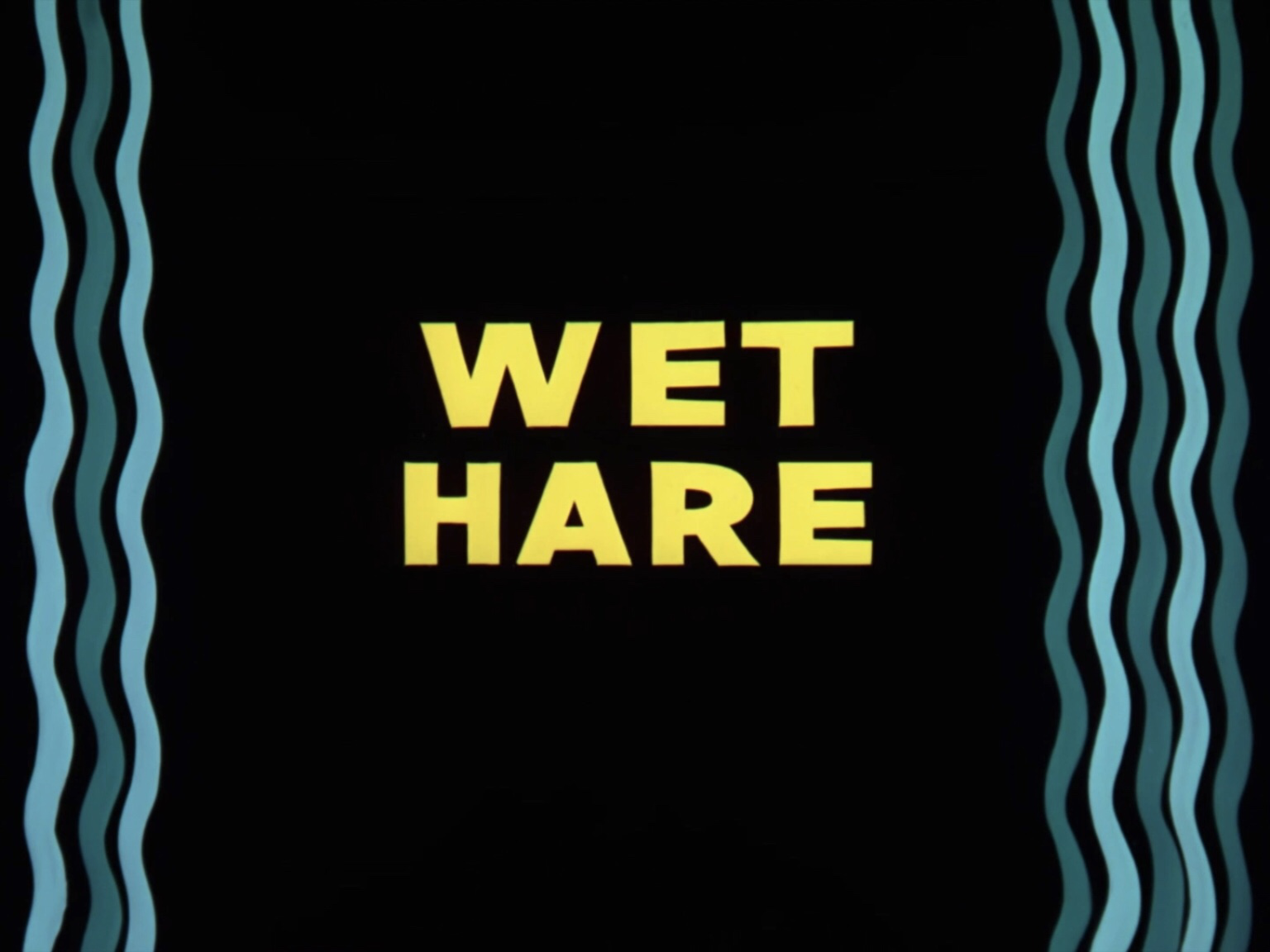
- Title card
- Directed by: Robert McKimson
- Story by: David Detiege
- Starring: Mel Blanc
- Edited by: Treg Brown
- Music by: Milt Franklyn
- Animation by: Keith Darling; Ted Bonnicksen; Warren Batchelder; George Grandpre'
- Layouts by: Robert Gribbroek
- Backgrounds by: Robert Gribbroek
- Color process: Technicolor
- Production company: Warner Bros. Cartoons
- Distributed by: Warner Bros. Pictures
- Release date: January 20, 1962 (US)
- Running time: 6:29
- Language: English

Wet Hare is a 1962 Warner Bros. Looney Tunes cartoon directed by Robert McKimson. The short was released on January 20, 1962, and stars Bugs Bunny. In the cartoon, Bugs finds himself at odds with a ruthless lumberjack who wants to control the water supply by building a series of dams.

== Plot ==
Bugs Bunny is taking his morning shower under a waterfall and singing "April Showers" in the style of Al Jolson when the water stops flowing. The source of the problem turns out to be the villainous Blacque Jacque Shellacque, who has built an illegal rock dam in an effort to control the water supply and sell it at inflated prices. Bugs tricks Jacque into removing a tiny rock, at the dam's base, which then dislodges the dam. Shellacque builds a series of dams, each one bigger than the last, with Bugs destroying them all. Shellacque builds a steel dam only to find that there is no water flowing as finally, Bugs turns the tables and builds a series of rock dams of his own (in revenge for Jacques shooting his grammaphone thinking it was Bugs). Their roles reverse as Shellacque destroys dam after dam, ending with his being arrested for attempting to destroy the "Grand Cooler Dam" (a pun on "Grand Coulee Dam").

== Home media ==
The film is available on the Looney Tunes Collector's Choice: Volume 3 Blu-ray.

Preceded by Prince Violent	Bugs Bunny Cartoons; 1962	Succeeded by Bill of Hare
