= Shishkabugs =

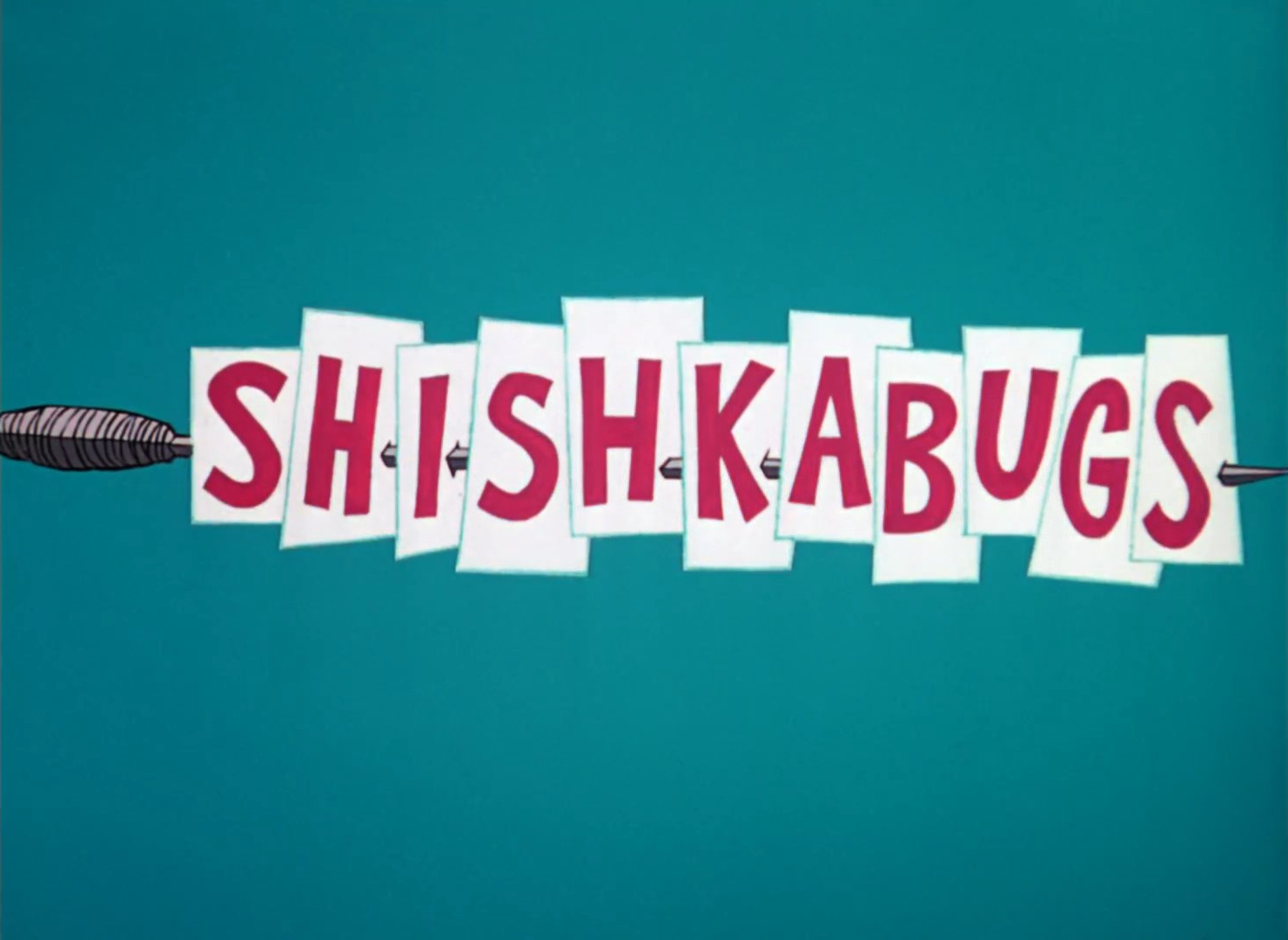
- Title card
- Directed by: Friz Freleng
- Story by: John Dunn
- Starring: Mel Blanc
- Edited by: Treg Brown
- Music by: Bill Lava
- Animation by: Gerry Chiniquy; Virgil Ross; Bob Matz; Lee Halpern; Art Leonardi
- Layouts by: Hawley Pratt
- Backgrounds by: Tom O'Loughlin
- Color process: Technicolor
- Production company: Warner Bros. Cartoons
- Distributed by: Warner Bros. Pictures
- Release date: December 8, 1962
- Running time: 5:34
- Language: English

Shishkabugs is a 1962 Warner Bros. Looney Tunes animated short directed by Friz Freleng. The short was released on December 8, 1962, and stars Bugs Bunny and Yosemite Sam. The title of the short is a play on shish kebab, a culinary dish.

== Plot ==
Cook Yosemite Sam presenting a dinner before the King (a Charles Laughton caricature).

Yosemite Sam serves as the beleaguered royal chef to a petulant king, and while pushing a cart full of groceries he complains about enduring the king's daily demands. When tasked with preparing hasenpfeffer (rabbit stew), a dish unfamiliar to him, Sam seeks assistance and encounters Bugs Bunny, who innocently seeks diced carrots.

Exploiting Bugs' naivety, Sam ensnares him in a culinary deception, convincing him of a royal dinner invitation. Subsequently, Bugs finds himself unwittingly trapped in a cooking pot, only to evade his predicament and depart unscathed. As Sam's scheme unravels, the king is subjected to comedic mishaps, culminating in Sam's arrest, imprisonment and possible future execution (he is marched past a statue of an axe-wielding armoured man). Bugs assumes the role of royal chef, presenting a giant carrot disguised as hasenpfeffer, tricking the king.

== Production notes ==
Being only five and a half minutes, Shishkabugs is the shortest Bugs Bunny cartoon released during the Golden Age of American animation. It also marks the rare occasion in which Yosemite Sam is the victim instead of the aggressor.

== See also ==
- List of Bugs Bunny cartoons
- List of Yosemite Sam cartoons

Preceded by Bill of Hare	Bugs Bunny Cartoons; 1962	Succeeded by Devil's Feud Cake
