= Wolfgang Lauenstein =

German film director, writer and animator

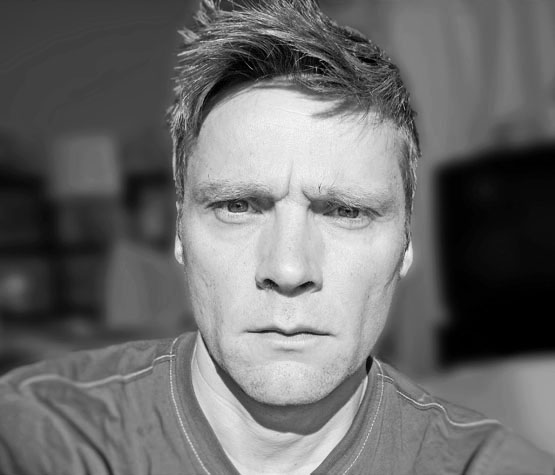
- Born: 20 March 1962 (age 63); Hildesheim, West Germany
- Occupations: Director, writer, animator
- Notable work: Balance (Academy Award winner)
- Relatives: Christoph Lauenstein (twin brother)

Wolfgang Lauenstein (born 20 March 1962 in Hildesheim, West Germany) is a German film director, writer and animator.

== Biography ==
Lauenstein entered the School of Fine Arts in Hamburg, Germany in 1985. While enrolled at the school Lauenstein, together with his twin brother Christoph, created the animated short film Balance. It received an Academy Award in the animated short film category in 1990. The Lauensteins have created a number of animation works for advertising (including station idents for MTV). They also directed and wrote the screenplay for two animated feature films, Luis and the Aliens and Spy Cat (both 2018).

== Works cited ==
- Olivier Cotte (2007) Secrets of Oscar-winning animation: Behind the scenes of 13 classic short animations. (Making of "Balance") Focal Press. ISBN 978-0-240-52070-4
