= 2025 in British music =

This is a summary of the year 2025 in British music.

== Events ==
=== January ===
- 1 January – BBC One sees in the New Year with Sophie Ellis-Bextor, who performs and hosts a "New Year Disco".
- 2 January – Neil Young announces he will not play the 2025 Glastonbury Festival because it is partnered with the BBC and he believes it to be "under corporate control".
- 3 January – Neil Young announces he will headline Glastonbury a day after saying he had turned down a slot because of the BBC's involvement in the event.
- 4 January – A statue of musician Rory Gallagher is unveiled at Belfast's Ulster Hall.
- 8 January
  - UK music fans spent £2.4bn on streaming and vinyl during 2024, data shows, exceeding the previous record of £2.2bn in 2001.
  - A UK inquest into the death of singer Liam Payne opens, and hears that he died as a result of "polytrauma".
- 10 January
  - Chappell Roan wins BBC Radio 1's Sound of 2025.
  - The Elton John compilation album Diamonds reaches number one in the UK Albums chart after 374 weeks.
  - Le Pub, a music venue in Newport which was threatened with closure, has been bought by a community enterprise, Music Venue Properties (MVP), which aims to protect live music locations.
- 16 January – The Ernst von Siemens Musikstiftung announces Sir Simon Rattle as the recipient of the 2025 Ernst von Siemens Music Prize.

=== February ===
- 4 February – The Royal Liverpool Philharmonic Orchestra announces the appointment of Vanessa Reed as its next chief executive, effective 2 June 2025.
- 5 February : It is announced that Ozzy Osbourne and Black Sabbath will reunite for a final fundraising concert in Birmingham on 5 July.
- 12 February – Oasis and New Order are among 14 acts on the 2025 longlist for inclusion in the Rock and Roll Hall of Fame.
- 13 February
  - It is announced that Mariah Carey will headline Brighton Pride on 2 August.
  - English Heritage announces that Marc Bolan is among a number of people to be honoured with blue plaques.
- 20 February – Charges are dropped against a friend of Liam Payne and two members of staff at the hotel in Argentina where he died.
- 25 February – Release of Is This What We Want?, a silent album co-written by more than 1,000 musicians, including Annie Lennox, Damon Albarn and Kate Bush, as a protest against planned changes to UK copyright law, which they argue will make it easier for AI companies to train models using copyrighted material without a licence.

=== March ===
- 1 March – The 2025 Brit Awards take place at The O2 in London. The ceremony will feature a performance by Sabrina Carpenter.
- 4 March – Edwyn Collins announces he is to stop touring live later in 2025 following a farewell tour.
- 5 March – Coldplay are to pick the acts for a Super Bowl-style half-time show during the 2026 FIFA World Cup final, the first time such a concert has been staged during the World Cup.
- 6 March
  - Media regulator Ofcom have received 825 complaints about ITV's coverage of the Brit Awards ceremony, the majority of them about Sabrina Carpenter's pre-watershed opening performance and Charli XCX's outfit.
  - The winners of the 2025 Royal Philharmonic Society Awards are announced at Royal Birmingham Conservatoire.
- 7 March – All-female country trio Remember Monday are chosen to represent the UK at the 2025 Eurovision Song Contest with their song "What the Hell Just Happened?".
- 8 March – Belfast is announced as the host of the 2026 Fleadh Cheoil na hÉireann (All-Ireland Fleadh), which will take place in August 2026.
- 10 March – King Charles III launches a personal playlist, The King's Music Room, through Apple Music with songs that have been important to him. Songs include tracks by Bob Marley, Kylie Minogue and Grace Jones.
- 13 March – Sugababes release their new single "Jungle".
- 17 March – Stevie Wonder is announced as the headline act at the 2025 Lytham Festival, and will perform on 3 July.
- 20 March – Stormzy is nominated for an honorary degree from the University of Cambridge in recognition of his philanthropic work and impact on education, music, sport and literature.
- 21 March – BBC Radio Wales DJ Aleighcia Scott reaches number one in the iTunes Reggae Chart with her first Welsh-language single, "Dod o'r Galon".
- 22 March – The Searchers announce they will stop touring after 68 years, ending with their Glastonbury debut at the 2025 Festival.
- 25 March – The Competition and Markets Authority says that Ticketmaster "may have misled Oasis fans" with unclear pricing over the band's reunion tour.
- 28 March – Release date of Sweet Illusions, the debut music album of actor Peter Capaldi.
- 29 March – Launch of the Black Welsh Music Awards, designed to recognise talented black musicians in Wales.

=== April ===
- 2 April – Muse have cancelled a forthcoming concert in Istanbul after the promoter insulted anti-government protestors in Turkey, leading to pressure from fans and local artists.
- 3 April – The Norddeutscher Rundfunk (NDR) announces the appointment of Nikki Iles as the next principal conductor of the NDR Big Band, the first woman to be named to the post, effective with the 2025–2026 season, with an initial contract of two years.
- 8 April – Sugababes release their latest single "Weeds".
- 10 April – Pulp announce the forthcoming release of a new album, More, as well as the release of "Spike Island", their first single since 2001.
- 11 April – Elton John's collaborative album with Brandi Carlile, Who Believes in Angels?, reaches number one in the UK Albums Chart, giving him the 10th number one album of his career.
- 18 April – Sault surprise-releases their new studio album 10.
- 27 April – A final tranche of tickets for the Glastonbury Festival 2025 goes on sale, and sells out within 20 minutes.
- 28 April – Bad Company and Joe Cocker are among acts inducted into the Rock & Roll Hall of Fame.
- 29 April – The Eden Project cancels a planned appearance by Irish Republican rappers Kneecap at its 2025 Eden Sessions festival in July following the emergence of video in which one of the band's members appeared to condone the killing of MPs.

=== May ===
- 2 May – Lewis Capaldi makes a surprise guest appearance to play a set at Edinburgh's Assembly Rooms during a benefit gig for the Campaign Against Living Miserably, a suicide prevention charity.
- 14 May – English National Opera announces the appointment of André de Ridder as its next music director, effective with the 2027–2028 season.
- 15–24 May – Norwich Jazz Festival returns after a 20 year hiatus.
- 16 May – South London resident Rebekah Shaman wins a High Court challenge over the use of Brockwell Park for a series of regular music events, arguing that the local council does not have the correct planning permission for the events. The decision means a number of events may have to be cancelled.
- 22 May – Olly Murs ends a show at Glasgow's Ovo Hydro after walking off stage because he was struggling with his voice.
- 27 May – News reports indicate a reversal of plans by Cardiff University to axe its music department.
- 28 May
  - Irish rap group Kneecap say they have been axed from Glasgow's TRNSMT festival because of police concerns about safety.
  - The London Mozart Players announce that Flynn Le Brocq is to stand down as its chief executive officer at the end of August 2025.

=== June ===
- 4–6 June – The 2025 Stendhal Festival takes place in Limavady, County Londonderry, Northern Ireland. Headline acts include the Lightning Seeds and Kate Nash.
- 7 June – Sir Paul McCartney makes a surprise guest appearance at Anfield stadium to duet with Bruce Springsteen during the second night of the Liverpool leg of Springsteen's Land of Hope and Dreams tour.
- 9 June
  - It is announced that the 2026 Brit Awards will be held at Manchester's Co-op Live arena, the first time the ceremony has been held outside London.
  - Glastonbury Festival organiser Emily Eavis says the festival has sold "a few thousand less tickets" in 2025 to help ease the build up of heavy crowds.
- 13 June – Pulp reach number one in the UK Albums Chart with their latest release, More, their first number one since 1998.
- 20 June – Dua Lipa plays her first concert at Wembley Stadium, which includes an appearance by Jamiroquai's Jay Kay for a duet of his 1996 song "Virtual Insanity".
- 21 June – Prime Minister Sir Keir Starmer says he does not think a planned performance by Kneecap at the Glastonbury Festival 2025 is "appropriate".
- 22 June – Liverpool's On the Waterfront Festival is halted after Lionel Duke, drummer with The Christians, suffers a cardiac arrest while playing on stage.
- 24 June – A report by Arts Council Wales warns that Welsh folk music could be extinct within a generation unless the situation is urgently addressed.
- 25 June – Stormzy is awarded an honorary degree from the University of Cambridge for his work in helping black students into higher education.
- 26 June – The BBC confirms that it will not be broadcasting Neil Young's Glastonbury Festival 2025 set at the request of the artist after he previously stated the festival was a "corporate turn-off" because of the BBC's involvement. This decision is later reversed.
- 27 June
  - Lewis Capaldi returns to Glastonbury two years after taking a break because of his mental health.
  - The 1975 are the Friday night headline act on the Pyramid Stage at Glastonbury.
- 28 June
  - Glastonbury's mystery act billed as Patchwork is revealed to be Pulp, who play a Saturday evening gig on the Pyramid Stage.
  - Neil Young is the Saturday night headline act on the Pyramid Stage, with the concert broadcast on BBC Two, while Charli XCX headlines on The Other Stage. Her gig, broadcast on BBC One, draws the larger audience.
  - Kneecap play the West Holts stage at Glastonbury, and use the opportunity to criticise the prime minister with expletive-laden chants.
  - Kneecap's appearance is preceded by rap duo Bob Vylan, who lead chants calling for death to the Israeli Defence Force. The BBC says footage of the gig will not be made available on BBC iPlayer, while festival organisers say they are "appalled" by the incident.
  - Avon and Somerset Police say they will retrieve footage of Kneecap's performance, along with that of Bob Vylan to see if an offence has been committed.
- 29 June
  - Rod Stewart plays the legends slot at Glastonbury.
  - Olivia Rodrigo headlines the Pyramid Stage on the final night of Glastonbury 2025.
- 30 June
  - Avon and Somerset Police launch a criminal investigation to determine whether comments made by Bob Vylan and Kneecap at their respective Glastonbury concerts constituted a criminal offence.
  - The BBC issues a statement in which it says it should have cut away from the livestream of Bob Vylan's concert following their anti-IDF chant. The statement comes after Ofcom said the BBC "clearly has questions to answer" over its coverage, and the UK government questioned why the comments were aired live.

=== July ===
- 2 July – Rap duo Bob Vylan are dropped from the Radar Festival, where they were due to headline the Manchester event on 5 July.
- 3 July – The BBC tells a small number of staff to step back from their day-to-day roles on music and live events following the broadcast of Bob Vylan's Glastonbury gig.
- 4 July
  - Oasis begin their five-month reunion tour in Cardiff, the band's first live concerts in 16 years.
  - The BBC Singers simultaneously announce the scheduled conclusion of the tenure of Sofi Jeannin as its chief conductor at the close of the 2025–2026 season, and the appointment of Owain Park as its next chief conductor, effective with the 2026–2027 season.
- 5 July – Ozzy Osbourne and Black Sabbath play what they say will be their final gig, titled Back to the Beginning, at Villa Park in Birmingham. The event raises £140m for local charities.
- 7 July – Irish rap group Kneecap use a concert at the O2 Academy Glasgow to criticise Scotland's First Minister, John Swinney, for being among those who said the band should not appear at the TRNSMT festival.
- 9 July – Sugababes release "Shook", the next single from their upcoming album.
- 10 July – Kneecap say they have been banned from displaying one of their posters on the London Underground.
- 11 July – Oasis return to Manchester for the first of five gigs at the city's Heaton Park.
- 12 July
  - BST Hyde Park cancels the final day of the festival, scheduled for 13 July, after Jeff Lynne pulls out of an appearance with his band, Jeff Lynne's Electric Light Orchestra, due to ill health.
  - Fans of Ozzy Osbourne are offered the chance to meet the Black Sabbath frontman for £666 at Comic Con Midlands in Birmingham.
- 18 July – Avon and Somerset Police conclude their investigation into Kneecap's Glastonbury performance, announcing that no further action will be taken against the rap group.
- 19 July – A cast member unfurls a Palestinian flag on stage during the curtain call of a performance of Il trovatore at London's Royal Opera House.
- 22 July – An agreement between the UK government and music industry will see better pay for session musicians and songwriters, with musicians guaranteed £75 per day plus expenses whenever they attend sessions or songwriting camp.
- 23 July – Fans in the UK and around the world pay tribute to Ozzy Osbourne, frontman of Black Sabbath and pioneer of heavy metal, following his death the previous day.
- 30 July – Thousands of people line the streets of Birmingham to watch a funeral procession for Ozzy Osbourne.
- 31 July – Jess Glynne criticises the White House for using a meme featuring her 2015 song "Hold My Hand" in a post about deportation.

=== August ===
- 1 August – The Baptist Union of Wales confirms that a campaign group set up to save Capel Rhondda in Hopkinstown, Rhondda Cynon Taf, where the hymn "Cwm Rhondda" was first performed in December 1907, will be allowed to buy the building.
- 9 August – An investigation is launched after The Sun reports that around 200 people were allowed into an Oasis gig at Wembley Stadium without buying tickets and were instead asked to pay £350 to be let into the venue through a disabled access entrance.
- 14 August – Coldplay frontman Chris Martin plays an impromptu gig at the Puzzle Hall Inn in Calderdale, West Yorkshire.
- 15 August – Audition recordings made by Dame Vera Lynn in 1935 are to be released for the first time.
- 24 August – A number of bands make an eleventh hour withdrawal from Portsmouth's Victorious Festival after Irish folk band The Mary Wallopers say they were "cut off" for displaying a Palestinian flag.
- 29 August – A BBC Proms performance by the Melbourne Symphony Orchestra is interrupted by pro-Palestinian protesters, requiring the concert to be paused for ten minutes. Jewish Artists for Palestine later claims responsibility.
- 30 August – Coldplay reschedule their final two Wembley Stadium gigs, scheduled for 7 and 8 September, to 6 and 12 September respectively, as a result of the industrial action on the London Underground on those dates.

=== September ===
- 2 September – Sting is sued by former the Police bandmates Andy Summers and Stewart Copeland for millions of pounds in lost royalties in a High Court writ.
- 3 September
  - Radiohead announce their first tour in seven years, which includes four nights at London's O2 Arena in November.
  - Morrissey announces that he is selling off his stake in the Smiths, including his rights to the name, songwriting credits, merchandising and contractual rights to the band's recordings. He explains that he wishes to disassociate himself from any connections to his former bandmates as well as business communications linked to the group.
- 5–7 September – Radio 2 in the Park takes place at Hylands Park in Chelmsford, with Bryan Adams and Def Leppard headlining.
- 12 September – Scottish rock band Franz Ferdinand have sponsored the youth football team Symington Tinto 2014s.
- 13 September
  - At the 2025 Last Night of The Proms at the Royal Albert Hall:
    - Alison Balsom gives the final performance of her musical career.
  - Sir Brian May and Roger Taylor of Queen join the BBC Symphony Chorus for the first ever symphonic performance of "Bohemian Rhapsody".
  - BBC News reports that Coldplay's Music of the Spheres World Tour is the highest attended music tour in history, with over 13 million tickets sold.
- 15 September
  - Lewis Capaldi is announced as the headline act of the 2026 Roundhay Festival, which is scheduled to take place on 4 July.
  - Paloma Faith delivers the Isle of Man Arts Council's annual lecture at the Gaiety Theatre in Douglas.
- 21 September – Morrissey cancels to planned concert dates in the United States after receiving a death threat ahead of a concert in Ottawa, Canada.
- 23 September – Zayn Malik announces a week-long residency in Las Vegas in January 2026.
- 25 September
  - The Competition and Markets Authority says thatTicketmaster will have to give music fans more advance information about ticket prices following complaints about the system used for the Oasis reunion tour.
  - The Royal Philharmonic Society awards Víkingur Ólafsson its Royal Philharmonic Society Gold Medal on-stage at the Royal Festival Hall.
- 26 September – A terrorism case against Liam Óg Ó hAnnaidh, a member of rap group Kneecap, is thrown out over a technical error in the way the charge against him was brought.
- 27 September
  - Heavy metal group Judas Priest release a charity version of the Black Sabbath song "War Pigs" featuring the vocals of Ozzy Osbourne.
  - Tickets for the 2026 Green Man Festival, scheduled for August, go on sale, and sell out within two hours.
- 30 September – Garsington Opera announces the appointment of Ben Weston as its new executive director, effective 10 November 2025.

=== October ===
- 6 October – Don Leisure wins the 2025 Welsh Music Prize for his album Tyrchu Sain.
- 7 October – The Crown Prosecution Service says it will appeal against the Chief Magistrate's decision to throw out the case against Kneecap rapper Liam Og Ó hAnnaidh.
- 8 October – The Stereophonics are forced to cancel a number of forthcoming tour dates after singer Kelly Jones suffered a "displaced jaw joint".
- 10 October – After four decades on the air, MTV is to stop showing rolling music videos in the UK, with MTV Music, MTV 80s, MTV 90s, Club MTV and MTV Live all closing by the end of the year.
- 11 October – West Yorkshire Police confirm that Lostprophets singer Ian Watkins, who was serving 29 years in prison for child sex offences, has died after being attacked at HMP Wakefield.
- 14 October – BBC Radio 3 show Round Midnight is named Jazz Media Award winner at the 2025 Parliamentary Jazz Awards.
- 16 October – Sam Fender wins the 2025 Mercury Prize for his third album, People Watching.
- 21 October – The London Mozart Players announce the appointment of Chrissy Kinsella as its next chief executive, effective 1 January 2026.
- 23 October – Punk-rock duo Bob Vylan postpone two UK gigs, scheduled for 5 November 2025 and 5 February 2026, blaming "political pressure".
- 24 October – The National Youth Orchestra of Great Britain announces the appointment of Alpesh Chauhan as its new principal conductor and musical advisor.
- 31 October – Dave becomes the first British rap artist to debut three albums at number one in the UK Albums Chart after his third album, The Boy Who Played the Harp, becomes the top-selling album of the week.

=== November ===
- 4 November – Global Media & Entertainment founder Ashley Tabor-King is presented with the 2025 Music Industry Trusts Award in recognition of his impact on British broadcasting and music.
- 6 November – Glasgow band Kai Reesu win the 2025 Scottish Album of the Year Award for their debut album Kompromat vol.i.
- 12 November – It is announced that Adele will make her acting debut in the Tom Ford film Cry to Heaven.
- 13 November – It is announced that Ezra Collective drummer and bandleader Femi Koleoso will join BBC Radio 6 Music as a regular presenter from 2 January 2026.
- 14 November – London girl group XO release their debut extended play, Fashionably Late, under Polydor Records.
- 18 November
  - English National Opera announces that Jenny Mollica is to stand down as its chief executive officer in the summer of 2026.
  - The Roundhouse announces the appointment of Jenny Mollica as its new chief executive, effective in 2026.
- 26 November – Madness play an exclusive Radio 2 in Concert gig at the BBC Radio Theatre in London for broadcast on Radio 2 on 11 December.
- 27 November – The Ulster Orchestra announces the appointment of Anna Handler as its next chief conductor, effective with the 2026–2027 season, with an initial contract of three years.

=== December ===
- 6 and 7 December – Capital's Jingle Bell Ball is held at The O2 Arena in London, with headlining acts including Ed Sheeran on 6 December and Kylie Minogue on 7 December.
- 13 December – Paediatric consultant Dr Sian Jenkins, based at Ysbyty Glangwili, Carmarthen, has written a Christmas song, Pob Un Plentyn (Every Child) for a choir, Cân o'r Galon, made up of young heart patients.
- 15 December
  - Sir Cliff Richard reveals that he has been treated for prostate cancer, and that the disease is in remission.
  - The Official Charts Company announces there are three contesters for the Christmas number one, with Kylie Minogue's "XMAS" ahead of "Last Christmas" by Wham! by 7,000 units, while Together for Palestine's "Lullaby" is 231 units behind Wham!.
  - A Primal Scream concert scheduled for the Trentham Live festival on 21 August 2026 is cancelled over claims antisemitic imagery was shown on stage at a previous gig in London.
  - Biffy Clyro bass player James Johnston announces he will not join the band on their upcoming UK and European tour because of mental health and addiction issues.
- 16 December – PRS for Music has paid out a record £274.9m in royalties during 2025, shared between 51,500 members.
- 19 December – "XMAS" by Kylie Minogue is the 2025 UK Christmas number one single, after beating off competition from Wham!'s "Last Christmas".
- 23 December – Following an investigation, Avon and Somerset Police announce that rap duo Bob Vylan will not face charges over their anti-IDF chant at Glastonbury.
- 30 December – 2026 New Year Honours: Among those from the world of music to be honoured is Ellie Goulding, who receives an MBE for her services to biodiversity and the climate.
- 31 December
  - Female artists, including Olivia Dean and Lola Young, have dominated UK music sales during 2025, with Oasis also experiencing a resurgence in sales following their summer tour.
  - BBC One airs Ronan Keating & Friends: A New Year's Eve Party to welcome in 2026.

== Bands disbanded ==
- Gang of Four
- Porridge Radio
- The Priests
- Saint Etienne
- Soft Cell
- Tapir!
- Whitesnake
- You Me At Six

== Bands reformed ==
- Appleton
- The Beta Band
- Black Box Recorder
- Black Sabbath (for final farewell gig)
- Chapterhouse
- Five (original line-up)
- Gene
- Super Furry Animals
- Transvision Vamp

== Classical works ==
- Sally Beamish – Field of Stars
- Sir George Benjamin – 'Interludes and Aria' from Lessons in Love and Violence
- Kieran Brunt – The Hologram of St. Cecilia
- John Casken – Mantle (for piano and wind quintet)
- Arowah (Anjelica Cleaver) – 'In This World Of War, Peace is What We're Fighting For'
- Anna Clyne – The Eye
- Erland Cooper – Birds of Paradise
- Tom Coult – Monologues for the Curious
- Jasdeep Singh Degun – Abbhā (A Tribute to Ustad Vilayat Khan)
- Donnacha Dennehy – Hard Landing
- Jasper Dommett – King Torques Hollow Acetate
- Edmund Finnis – Cello Concerto
- Simon Holt – Acrobats on a loose wire (for flute and string trio)
- Natalie Holt – Eyjafjallajökull
- Helen Grime (music) and Zoe Gilbert (text) – Long Have I Lain Beside the Water (for soprano, flute, clarinet, string trio and harp)
- Sir Stephen Hough – Nocturne for September 10th 2001
- Sir Karl Jenkins – 'The Signs Still Point the Way'
- Sir James MacMillan – 'Where the Lugar meets the Glaisnock' (euphonium concerto)
- Colin Matthews – Canon for soprano and piano trio
- David Matthews – Serenade and Tango
- Thea Musgrave – In memoriam 2022
- Nkeiru Okoye – And The People Celebrated
- Rachel Portman – 'The Gathering Tree' (text by Nick Drake)
- Mark Simpson – Zebra (or, 2-3-74: The Divine Invasion of Philip K Dick)
- Rakhi Singh – 'There is nothing in the sky'
- Aileen Sweeney – Views from the M9
- Dobrinka Tabakova – Concerto for Accordion and Orchestra
- Mark-Anthony Turnage – Sco (guitar concerto)
- Errollyn Wallen –
  - Remembering 2012
  - The Elements
- Huw Watkins
  - Concerto for Orchestra
  - Octet
- Ryan Wigglesworth – for Laura, after Bach

=== New operas ===
- Mark-Anthony Turnage and Lee Hall – Festen
- Mark-Anthony Turnage and Rachel Hewer – The Railway Children

== British music awards ==
=== 2025 Royal Philharmonic Society Awards ===
- Chamber-Scale Composition: Sarah Lianne Lewis – letting the light in
- Conductor: Kazuki Yamada
- Ensemble: Paraorchestra
- Gamechanger: NMC Recordings
- Impact: Re:Discover Festival – Streetwise Opera
- Inspiration: Open Arts Community Choir
- Instrumentalist: Laura van der Heijden
- Large-Scale Composition: Katherine Balch – whisper concerto
- Opera and Music Theatre: Death in Venice – Welsh National Opera
- Series and Events: The Cumnock Tryst
- Singer: Claire Booth
- Storytelling: Classical Africa – BBC Radio 3
- Young Artist: GBSR Duo

== Charts and sales ==
=== Number-one singles ===
The singles chart includes a proportion for streaming.

Key
†	Best performing single of the year

Chart date (week ending)	Song	Artist(s)	Chart sales	References
2 January	"Last Christmas"	Wham!	114,290	
9 January	"That's So True"	Gracie Abrams	46,869	
16 January	"That's So True"	Gracie Abrams	49,122	
23 January	"That's So True"	Gracie Abrams	50,584	
30 January	"Messy"	Lola Young	50,697	
6 February	"Messy"	Lola Young	56,524	
13 February	"Messy"	Lola Young	56,479	
20 February	"Messy"	Lola Young	51,751	
27 February	"Not Like Us"	Kendrick Lamar	52,507	
6 March	"Not Like Us"	Kendrick Lamar	37,456	
13 March	"Pink Pony Club"	Chappell Roan	38,646	
20 March	"Pink Pony Club"	Chappell Roan	39,032	
27 March	"Ordinary" †	Alex Warren	49,451	
3 April	"Ordinary" †	Alex Warren	62,369	
10 April	"Ordinary" †	Alex Warren	71,522	
17 April	"Ordinary" †	Alex Warren	73,490	
24 April	"Ordinary" †	Alex Warren	70,615	
1 May	"Ordinary" †	Alex Warren	66,007	
8 May	"Ordinary" †	Alex Warren	69,243	
15 May	"Ordinary" †	Alex Warren	65,972	
22 May	"Ordinary" †	Alex Warren	66,035	
29 May	"Ordinary" †	Alex Warren	63,651	
5 June	"Ordinary" †	Alex Warren	61,286	
12 June	"Ordinary" †	Alex Warren	60,524	
19 June	"Manchild"	Sabrina Carpenter	62,373	
26 June	"Ordinary" †	Alex Warren	59,221	
3 July	"Manchild"	Sabrina Carpenter	45,756	
10 July	"Survive"	Lewis Capaldi	68,414	
17 July	"Dior"	MK featuring Chrystal	39,701	
24 July	"Dior"	MK featuring Chrystal	42,157	
31 July	"Daisies"	Justin Bieber	40,643	
7 August	"Golden"	Huntrix	42,853	
14 August	"The Subway"	Chappell Roan	54,491	
21 August	"Golden"	Huntrix	51,955	
28 August	"Golden"	Huntrix	59,449	
4 September	"Golden"	Huntrix	65,464	
11 September	"Golden"	Huntrix	69,326	
18 September	"Golden"	Huntrix	68,222	
25 September	"Golden"	Huntrix	66,682	
2 October	"Golden"	Huntrix	67,855	
9 October	"Man I Need"	Olivia Dean	76,820	
16 October	"The Fate of Ophelia"	Taylor Swift	132,501	
23 October	"The Fate of Ophelia"	Taylor Swift	90,198	
30 October	"The Fate of Ophelia"	Taylor Swift	67,888	
6 November	"Golden"	Huntrix	65,982	
13 November	"Golden"	Huntrix	59,485	
20 November	"The Fate of Ophelia"	Taylor Swift	58,925	
27 November	"The Fate of Ophelia"	Taylor Swift	53,518	
4 December	"The Fate of Ophelia"	Taylor Swift	49,524	
11 December	"The Fate of Ophelia"	Taylor Swift	46,495	
18 December	"Last Christmas"	Wham!	42,470	
25 December	"XMAS"	Kylie Minogue	55,926	

=== Number-one albums ===
The albums chart includes a proportion for streaming.

Key
†	Best performing album of the year

Chart date (week ending)	Album	Artist(s)	Chart sales	References
2 January	Christmas	Michael Bublé	27,016	
9 January	+−=÷× (Tour Collection)	Ed Sheeran	15,606	
16 January	Diamonds	Elton John	14,759	
23 January	The Rise and Fall of a Midwest Princess	Chappell Roan	10,191	
30 January	Better Man	Robbie Williams	43,238	
6 February	Can't Rush Greatness	Central Cee	42,372	
13 February	Hurry Up Tomorrow	The Weeknd	33,694	
20 February	Lover (Live from Paris)	Taylor Swift	46,812	
27 February	Short n' Sweet	Sabrina Carpenter	34,091	
6 March	People Watching	Sam Fender	107,124	
13 March	Short n' Sweet	Sabrina Carpenter	17,761	
20 March	Mayhem	Lady Gaga	55,577	
27 March	Music	Playboi Carti	21,666	
3 April	Koko	The Lottery Winners	23,420	
10 April	Rushmere	Mumford & Sons	35,655	
17 April	Who Believes in Angels?	Elton John and Brandi Carlile	22,843	
24 April	God Shaped Hole	Those Damn Crows	16,412	
1 May	The Tortured Poets Department	Taylor Swift	28,945	
8 May	Make 'Em Laugh, Make 'Em Cry, Make 'Em Wait	Stereophonics	31,195	
15 May	Pink Floyd at Pompeii – MCMLXXII	Pink Floyd	13,870	
22 May	Even in Arcadia	Sleep Token	28,223	
29 May	I'm the Problem	Morgan Wallen	19,474	
5 June	Short n' Sweet	Sabrina Carpenter	9,684	
12 June	+–=÷× (Tour Collection)	Ed Sheeran	9,908	
19 June	More	Pulp	29,948	
26 June	Don't Tell the Dog	James Marriott	14,528	
3 July	Idols	Yungblud	25,947	
10 July	Virgin	Lorde	18,848	
17 July	Time Flies... 1994–2009	Oasis	21,015	
24 July	Moisturizer	Wet Leg	26,014	
31 July	You'll Be Alright, Kid	Alex Warren	20,843	
7 August	Pretty on the Internet	The K's	25,032	
14 August	Bite Me	Reneé Rapp	15,643	
21 August	Time Flies... 1994–2009	Oasis	15,074	
28 August	Everywhere I Went, Led Me to Where I Didn't Want to Be	Tom Grennan	23,772	
4 September	The Clearing	Wolf Alice	30,136	
11 September	Man's Best Friend	Sabrina Carpenter	85,305	
18 September	Man's Best Friend	Sabrina Carpenter	32,591	
25 September	Play	Ed Sheeran	67,654	
2 October	Futique	Biffy Clyro	32,043	
9 October	The Art of Loving	Olivia Dean	52,366	
16 October	The Life of a Showgirl †	Taylor Swift	423,444	
23 October	The Life of a Showgirl †	Taylor Swift	47,356	
30 October	The Life of a Showgirl †	Taylor Swift	32,532	
6 November	The Boy Who Played the Harp	Dave	73,779	
13 November	Everybody Scream	Florence and the Machine	31,369	
20 November	The Life of a Showgirl †	Taylor Swift	19,363	
27 November	Everyone's a Star!	5 Seconds of Summer	19,119	
4 December	One More Time	Aerosmith and Yungblud	22,394	
11 December	The Art of Loving	Olivia Dean	20,588	
18 December	Kylie Christmas (Fully Wrapped)	Kylie Minogue	23,279	
25 December	Wish You Were Here	Pink Floyd	24,476	

=== Number-one compilation albums ===
The compilation albums chart includes a proportion for streaming.

Chart date (week ending)	Album	Chart sales	References
2 January	Wicked: The Soundtrack	12,338	
9 January	Wicked: The Soundtrack	8,919	
16 January	Wicked: The Soundtrack	8,886	
23 January	Wicked: The Soundtrack	8,578	
30 January	Wicked: The Soundtrack	7,037	
6 February	Wicked: The Soundtrack	6,014	
13 February	Wicked: The Soundtrack	5,256	
20 February	Wicked: The Soundtrack	6,920	
27 February	Wicked: The Soundtrack	4,404	
6 March	Wicked: The Soundtrack	3,613	
13 March	Wicked: The Soundtrack	3,840	
20 March	Wicked: The Soundtrack	3,411	
27 March	The Greatest Showman	3,129	
3 April	The Greatest Showman	3,067	
10 April	Now Presents Clubland	3,385	
17 April	Now 120	8,998	
24 April	Now 120	3,890	
1 May	The Greatest Showman	2,564	
8 May	Now Yearbook 1989	4,881	
15 May	The Greatest Showman	2,553	
22 May	The Greatest Showman	2,580	
29 May	Eurovision Song Contest: Basel 2025	10,976	
5 June	Eurovision Song Contest: Basel 2025	6,211	
12 June	Now 70s 2025	4,080	
19 June	Hamilton	3,538	
26 June	Hamilton	3,600	
3 July	KPop Demon Hunters	4,015	
10 July	KPop Demon Hunters	7,871	
17 July	KPop Demon Hunters	10,079	
24 July	KPop Demon Hunters	11,751	
31 July	KPop Demon Hunters	14,465	
7 August	KPop Demon Hunters	16,176	
14 August	KPop Demon Hunters	17,521	
21 August	KPop Demon Hunters	19,161	
28 August	KPop Demon Hunters	20,546	
4 September	KPop Demon Hunters	21,762	
11 September	KPop Demon Hunters	22,705	
18 September	KPop Demon Hunters	21,867	
25 September	KPop Demon Hunters	22,504	
2 October	KPop Demon Hunters	21,559	
9 October	KPop Demon Hunters	20,341	
16 October	KPop Demon Hunters	19,776	
23 October	KPop Demon Hunters	22,257	
30 October	KPop Demon Hunters	21,493	
6 November	KPop Demon Hunters	21,953	
13 November	KPop Demon Hunters	17,733	
20 November	KPop Demon Hunters	16,063	
27 November	KPop Demon Hunters	13,747	
4 December	Wicked: For Good – The Soundtrack	20,535	
11 December	KPop Demon Hunters	15,920	
18 December	KPop Demon Hunters	11,821	
25 December	KPop Demon Hunters	11,134	

== Year-end charts ==
=== Top singles of the year ===
This chart was published by the Official Charts Company on 26 December 2025

No.	Title	Artist(s)	Peak position	Combined
1	"Ordinary"	Alex Warren	1	2,200,000
2	"Messy"	Lola Young	1	1,400,000
3	"Pink Pony Club"	Chappell Roan	1	1,400,000
4	"Golden"	Huntrix/Ejae/Audrey Nuna/Rei Ami & KPop Demon Hunters Cast	1	
5	"APT"	ROSÉ and Bruno Mars	2	
6	"That's So True"	Gracie Abrams	1	
7	"Beautiful Things"	Benson Boone	4 (Note: Reached number 1 in 2024)	
8	"Love Me Not"	Ravyn Lenae	2	
9	"Man I Need"	Olivia Dean	1	
10	"Die With a Smile"	Lady Gaga and Bruno Mars	8 (Note: Reached number 2 in 2024)	
11	"Birds of a Feather"	Billie Eilish	14 (Note: Reached number 2 in 2024)	
12	"The Days"	Chrystal	4	
13	"Good Luck, Babe!"	Chappell Roan	17 (Note: Reached number 2 in 2024)	
14	"Lose Control"	Teddy Swims	23 (Note: Reached number 2 in 2024)	
15	"Back to Friends"	Sombr	7	
16	"Undressed"	Sombr	4	
17	"Espresso"	Sabrina Carpenter	15 (Note: Reached number 1 in 2024)	
18	"Sailor Song"	Gigi Perez	4 (Note: Reached number 1 in 2024)	
19	"Taste"	Sabrina Carpenter	18 (Note: Reached number 1 in 2024)	
20	"Bad Dreams"	Teddy Swims	7 (Note: Reached number 6 in 2024)	
21	"The Door"	Teddy Swims	6 (Note: Reached number 5 in 2024)	
22	"Sports Car"	Tate McRae	3	
23	"Nice to Meet You"	Myles Smith	6	
24	"Manchild"	Sabrina Carpenter	1	
25	"Stargazing"	Myles Smith	29 (Note: Reached number 4 in 2024)	
26	"Nice to Each Other"	Olivia Dean	4	
27	"A Bar Song (Tipsy)"	Shaboozey	25 (Note: Reached number 3 in 2024)	
28	"Iris"	Goo Goo Dolls	39 (Note: Reached number 3 in 2011)	
29	"The Fate of Ophelia"	Taylor Swift	1	
30	"Carry You Home"	Alex Warren	9	
31	"Mr. Brightside"	The Killers	46 (Note: Reached number 10 in 2004)	
32	"Show Me Love"	WizTheMc & Bees & Honey	3	
33	"Stick Season"	Noah Kahan	31 (Note: Reached number 1 in 2024)	
34	"Too Sweet"	Hozier	24 (Note: Reached number 1 in 2024)	
35	"No Broke Boys"	Disco Lines and Tinashe	2	
36	"Soda Pop"	Saja Boys	3	
37	"Dreams"	Fleetwood Mac	41 (Note: Reached number 24 in 1977)	
38	"Rein Me In"	Sam Fender & Olivia Dean	5 (Note: Reached number 1 in 2026)	
39	"Azizam"	Ed Sheeran	3	
40	"Dior"	MK featuring Chrystal	1	

=== Best-selling albums ===
This chart was published by the Official Charts Company on 31 December 2025

No.	Title	Artist	Peak position	Combined
1	The Life of a Showgirl	Taylor Swift	1	642,000
2	Short n' Sweet	Sabrina Carpenter	1	518,000
3	+−=÷× (Tour Collection)	Ed Sheeran	1	410,000
4	Time Flies... 1994-2009	Oasis	1	379,000
5	50 Years - Don't Stop	Fleetwood Mac	4	
6	The Highlights	The Weeknd	4 (Note: Reached number 2 in 2021)	
7	(What's the Story) Morning Glory?	Oasis	2 (Note: Reached number 1 in 1995)	312,000
8	Man's Best Friend	Sabrina Carpenter	1	304,000
9	You'll Be Alright, Kid	Alex Warren	1	285,000
10	People Watching	Sam Fender	1	278,000
11	The Art of Loving	Olivia Dean	1	
12	Diamonds	Elton John	1	
13	The Rise and Fall of a Midwest Princess	Chappell Roan	1	
14	The Essential Michael Jackson	Michael Jackson	8 (Note: Reached number 1 in 2009)	
15	So Close to What	Tate McRae	2	
16	Stick Season	Noah Kahan	7 (Note: Reached number 1 in 2024)	
17	Hit Me Hard and Soft	Billie Eilish	6 (Note: Reached number 1 in 2024)	
18	Brat	Charli XCX	5 (Note: Reached number 1 in 2024)	
19	ABBA Gold	ABBA	9 (Note: Reached number 1 in 1992)	
20	Rumours	Fleetwood Mac	7 (Note: Reached number 1 in 1978)	
21	SOS	SZA	3 (Note: Reached number 2 in 2022)	
22	AM	Arctic Monkeys	11 (Note: Reached number 1 in 2013)	
23	Papercuts (Singles Collection 2000-2023)	Fleetwood Mac	14 (Note: Reached number 4 in 2024)	
24	Definitely, Maybe	Oasis	4 (Note: Reached number 1 in 1994)	
25	Curtain Call: The Hits	Eminem	15 (Note: Reached number 1 in 2005)	
26	The Tortured Poets Department	Taylor Swift	1	
27	Guts	Olivia Rodrigo	8 (Note: Reached number 1 in 2023)	
28	Sour	Olivia Rodrigo	11 (Note: Reached number 1 in 2021)	
29	Mayhem	Lady Gaga	1	
30	The Secret of Us	Gracie Abrams	3 (Note: Reached number 1 in 2024)	
31	Greatest Hits	Queen	24 (Note: Reached number 1 in 1981)	
32	The Diamond Collection	Post Malone	19 (Note: Reached number 14 in 2023)	
33	96 Months	Calvin Harris	23 (Note: Reached number 11 in 2024)	
34	Can't Rush Greatness	Central Cee	1	
35	Greatest Hits	Pitbull	21	
36	Eternal Sunshine	Ariana Grande	3 (Note: Reached number 1 in 2024)	
37	Fireworks & Rollerblades	Benson Boone	27 (Note: Reached number 16 in 2024)	
38	Piano Man: The Very Best of Billy Joel	Billy Joel	28 (Note: Reached number 7 in 2010)	
39	÷	Ed Sheeran	28 (Note: Reached number 1 in 2017)	
40	Best of 50 Cent	50 Cent	28	

== Deaths ==
- 2 January – Russ North, 59, English heavy metal singer (Cloven Hoof).
- 9 January – Laurie Holloway, 86, English pianist, musical director and composer.
- 10 January – Colin Carter, 76, British musician (Flash).
- 13 January – Elgar Howarth, 89, English conductor, composer and trumpeter.
- 15 January – Linda Nolan, 65, Irish-English singer, actress and television personality.
- 18 January – Claire van Kampen, 71, English composer (Royal Shakespeare Company), playwright and theatre director, cancer.
- 20 January – John Sykes, 65, English guitarist (Tygers of Pan Tang, Whitesnake) and songwriter ("Is This Love"), cancer. (death announced on this date)
- 25 January – Edweena Banger, British musician (The Nosebleeds, Slaughter & The Dogs). (death announced on this date)
- 30 January – Marianne Faithfull, 78, English singer ("As Tears Go By"), songwriter ("Broken English") and actress (The Girl on a Motorcycle).
- 1 February – Peter Bassano, 79–80, English trombonist ("Hey Jude") and conductor.
- 5 February – Mike Ratledge, 81, British musician (Soft Machine).
- 8 February – Howard Riley (musician), 81, English jazz and free improvising pianist .
- 12 February – Denis Wick, 93, British trombonist.
- 17 February – Jamie Muir, 82, Scottish painter and musician (King Crimson).
- 18 February – Rick Buckler, 69, English drummer (the Jam).
- 19 February – Snowy Fleet, 79, English-born Australian drummer (The Easybeats).
- 25 February – Simon Lindley, 76, English organist, choirmaster and composer.
- 26 February – James Lockhart, 94, Scottish conductor
- 1 March – Joey Molland, 77, English songwriter, guitarist (Badfinger)
- 3 March – Geraint Jarman, 74, Welsh musician, poet and television producer.
- 6 March – Brian James, 70, English punk rock guitarist (The Damned, The Lords of the New Church) and songwriter ("New Rose").
- 10 March – Stedman Pearson, 60, British singer (Five Star), complications from diabetes.
- 17 March – Peter Farrelly, 76, Northern Irish musician (Fruupp). (death announced on this date)
- 22 March – Paul Wagstaff, British guitarist (Paris Angels, Black Grape). (death announced on this date)
- 24 March – Alan Cuckston, 85, classical harpsichordist, pianist, conductor, and lecturer
- 5 April – Dave Allen, 69, English bassist (Gang of Four, Shriekback, King Swamp).
- 11 April – Mike Berry, 82, English singer ("The Sunshine of Your Smile") and actor (Are You Being Served?, Worzel Gummidge).
- 18 April – Clodagh Rodgers, 78, Northern Irish singer ("Come Back and Shake Me", "Jack in the Box").
- 21 April – Martin Longborough, 83, opera administrator and founder of Longborough Festival Opera
- 24 April – Roy Phillips, 83, British musician (The Peddlers).
- 26 April – Charles Beare, 87–88, British violin expert and craftsman.
- 27 April – Wizz Jones, 86, English acoustic guitarist and singer-songwriter.
- 28 April – Mike Peters, 66, Welsh rock singer (The Alarm) and songwriter ("Sixty Eight Guns"), chronic lymphocytic leukemia.
- 7 May – Ronald Corp, 74, classical composer and conductor
- 10 May – Matthew Best, 68, classical conductor and singer.
- 25 May – Simon House, 76, English multi-instrumentalist (Hawkwind, David Bowie, Third Ear Band).
- 2 June – Colin Jerwood, 63, English punk singer (Conflict).
- 11 June – Douglas McCarthy, 58, English musician (Nitzer Ebb).
- 13 June – Honest John Plain, 73, English guitarist and singer (The Boys).
- 16 June – John Reid, 61, Scottish record producer, singer (Nightcrawlers) and songwriter. (death announced on this date)
- 19 June – James Prime, 64, Scottish musician (Deacon Blue), cancer.
- 20 June – Patrick Walden, 46, English guitarist (Babyshambles).
- 23 June – Mick Ralphs, 81, English Hall of Fame guitarist (Mott the Hoople, Bad Company) and songwriter ("Feel Like Makin' Love"), complications from a stroke. (death announced on this date)
- 29 June – Stuart Burrows, 92, Welsh operatic tenor.
- 2 July – Diana McVeagh, classical music scholar, 98
- 4 July – Kevin Riddles, 68, British bassist and keyboardist (Angel Witch, Tytan).
- 13 July – Dave Cousins, 85, English musician (Strawbs) and songwriter ("Lay Down", "Shine on Silver Sun").
- 15 July – Billy April, 61, British musician (Driza Bone), record producer and songwriter. (death announced on this date)
- 18 July – Sir Roger Norrington, 91, classical music conductor.
- 21 July – David Rendall, 76, classical music tenor.
- 22 July –
  - Ozzy Osbourne, 76, English musician (Black Sabbath).
  - John Palmer, 82, English musician (Family, Blossom Toes, Bakerloo). (death announced on this date)
- 24 July – Dame Cleo Laine, 97, English jazz singer.
- 29 July – Paul Mario Day, 69, English singer (Iron Maiden, More, The Sweet), cancer.
- 5 August – Terry Reid, 75, English rock singer (Peter Jay and the Jaywalkers). (death announced on this date)
- 21 August – Kurt-Hans Goedicke, 90, German-born orchestral timpanist with the London Symphony Orchestra
- 28 August – Ray Mayhew, 59–60, British drummer (Sigue Sigue Sputnik).
- 6 September – Rick Davies, 81, English musician (Supertramp), and songwriter ("Bloody Well Right", "Goodbye Stranger"), cancer.
- 11 September – Viv Prince, 84, English drummer (Pretty Things). (death announced on this date)
- 13 September – Stephen Luscombe, 70, English musician (Blancmange) and songwriter ("Living on the Ceiling", "Don't Tell Me").
- 19 September – JD Twitch, 57, Scottish DJ (Optimo).
- 23 September – Danny Thompson, 86, English bassist (Pentangle, Alexis Korner's Blues Incorporated).
- 2 October – Chris Dreja, 79, English Hall of Fame guitarist (The Yardbirds). (death announced on this date)
- 8 October – Ace Finchum, 62, British drummer (Tigertailz, Marseille, Tokyo Blade). (death announced on this date)
- 10 October – John Lodge, 82, English Hall of Fame musician (The Moody Blues) and songwriter ("I'm Just a Singer (In a Rock and Roll Band)", "Gemini Dream").
- 11 October – Ian Watkins, 48, Welsh singer (Lostprophets) and convicted paedophile, stabbed.
- 12 October – John Waterhouse, 75, British guitarist (Demon).
- 13 October – Matt Tolfrey, 44, English DJ, producer and record label owner. (death announced on this date)
- 22 October – David Ball, 66, English musician (Soft Cell, The Grid).
- 23 October – David Wilde, 90, English pianist.
- 5 November – Gilson Lavis, 74, English drummer (Squeeze, Jools Holland and his Rhythm & Blues Orchestra).
- 6 November – Chris Bradley, British bass guitarist (Savage).
- 10 November – Richard Darbyshire, 65, English singer and songwriter (Living in a Box).
- 20 November – Mani, 63, English rock bassist (The Stone Roses, Primal Scream). (death announced on this date)
- 24 December – John Boulter, 94, British tenor
- 17 December – Max Eider, British guitarist (The Jazz Butcher) and songwriter. (death announced on this date)
- 22 December – Chris Rea, 74, singer and guitarist.
- 24 December – Perry Bamonte, 65, English Hall of Fame rock musician (The Cure, Love Amongst Ruin).

== See also ==
- 2025 in British radio
- 2025 in British television
- 2025 in the United Kingdom
- List of British films of 2025
