= UK Singles Downloads Chart =

British music chart

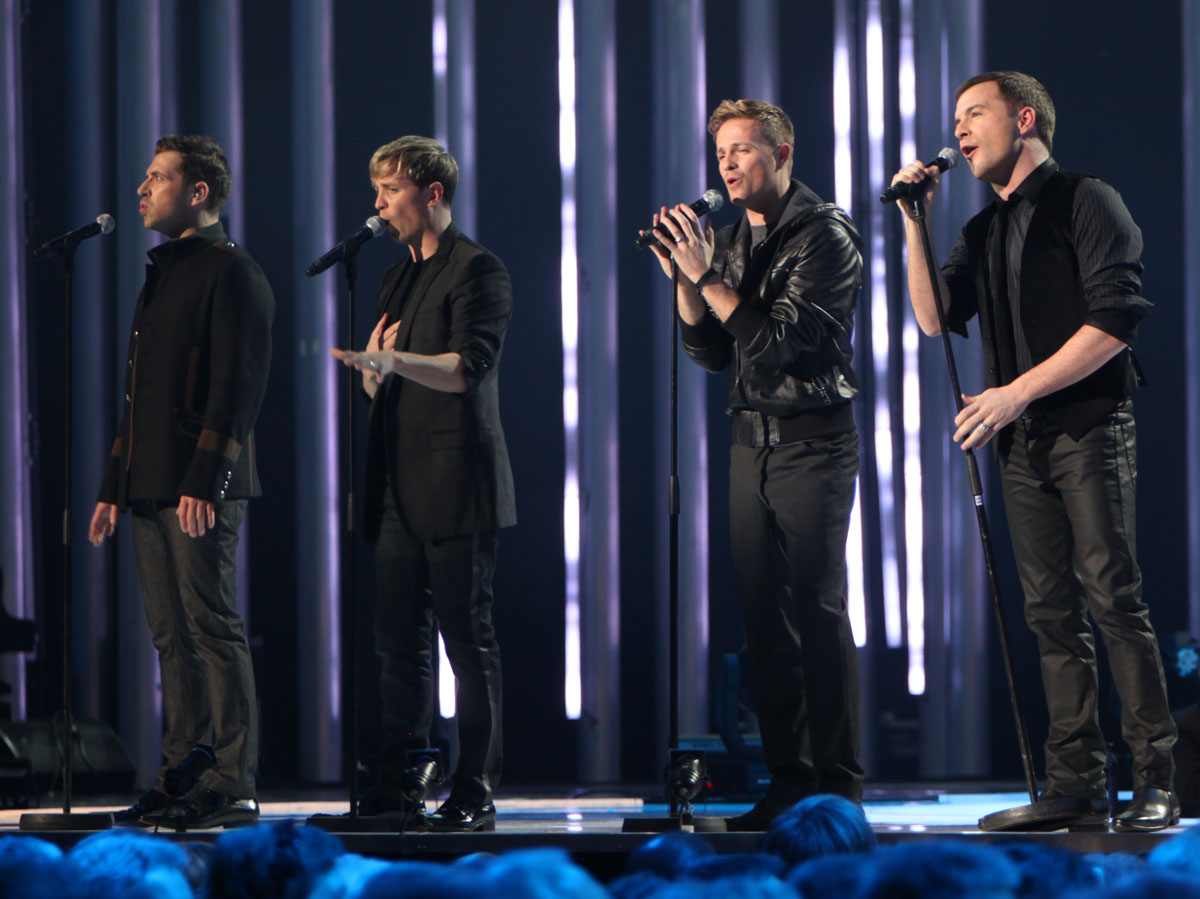
Irish boy band Westlife achieved the first number one on the UK Singles Downloads Chart with "Flying Without Wings" in September 2004.

The UK Singles Downloads Chart is compiled by the Official Charts Company (OCC) on behalf of the music industry. Since July 2015, the chart week runs from Friday to Thursday, with the chart date given as the following Thursday.

The main chart contains the Top 200 downloads (which are published in UKChartsPlus), with the top 100 published on the OCC website. The chart only uses sales of permanent digital downloads, that is single-download tracks on non-subscription online music stores. Some downloading services offer a monthly fee plan where generally an unlimited number of tracks can be downloaded within a month for a certain price. Tracks downloaded in those instances do not qualify.

An album equivalent, the UK Album Downloads Chart, was launched in April 2006.

== History ==
Before the inauguration of the download chart, only sales of physical formats—such as CD, vinyl and cassette tape—contributed towards a single's position on the UK music charts. From the late 1990s onwards, these sales began to significantly decline. By the start of 2004, they had dropped to their lowest level in over 35 years, with singles needing to sell only 35,000 copies to reach number one. One year later, a limited edition re-release of "One Night" / "I Got Stung" by Elvis Presley topped the chart with 22,000 copies, making it the lowest selling number-one single at that time. Conversely, the music download market was growing considerably: during the same 2004–05 period, sales of downloads grew by 743%, and overtook physical sales in December 2004. The following year, the UK's online music revenue reached £42.1 million.

As a result of this growth, the OCC were commissioned in 2004 to compile a new music chart based solely on the UK's download sales, which was initially sponsored by Coca-Cola. A "sample" download chart was trialled for 10 weeks, with the first number one being "Bam Thwok" by American rock band Pixies. After this ten-week period, the UK Official Download Chart was launched on 1 September 2004, with Irish boy band Westlife achieving the first official number one. The group topped the chart with a live version of their 1999 single "Flying Without Wings", a move that UK chart commentator James Masterton branded a "stunt".

Sales of downloaded singles were finally incorporated into the UK Singles Chart on 17 April 2005, initially on the condition that physical copies were available to buy at the same time. In April 2006, the UK Official Download Chart was expanded to include an album chart. The first album to top the chart was This New Day by English alternative rock band Embrace. By 2007, the UK had become Europe's largest consumer of online music, with almost 78 million tracks being downloaded that year; by 2012, this figure had more than doubled.

The single with the longest stay on the Downloads Chart is "Crazy" by Gnarls Barkley, which stayed at the top spot for 11 weeks. On the week ending 26 December 2009, "Killing in the Name" by Rage Against the Machine became the fastest-selling download of all time. As of 9 September 2014, "Happy" by Pharrell Williams is the most downloaded song in UK music download history.

In 2006, McFly became the first band to have two number-one singles with "Star Girl" on both the UK Downloads Chart and the UK Singles Chart at the same time.

In 2024 Coldplay became the 500th song to top the chart with "We Pray".

== Criteria for inclusion ==
- The track must have a maximum playing time of 15 minutes.
- PDDs (Permanent Digital Downloads) must be bought by the retailer at a minimum of 40p per track, or 32p if the record company does not publish a set dealer price. The retailer may sell tracks at a loss at its own discretion.

== Most-downloaded by year ==
Year	Single	Artist	Record label	Ref.
2004	"Vertigo"	U2	Universal	
2005	"You're Beautiful"	James Blunt	Warner	
2006	"A Moment Like This"	Leona Lewis	Sony	
2007	"Grace Kelly"	Mika	Universal	
2008	"Hallelujah"	Alexandra Burke	Sony	
2009	"Poker Face"	Lady Gaga	Universal	
2010	"Love the Way You Lie"	Eminem featuring Rihanna	Universal	
2011	"Someone Like You"	Adele	Beggars	
2012	"Somebody That I Used to Know"	Gotye featuring Kimbra	Universal	
2013	"Blurred Lines"	Robin Thicke featuring T.I. and Pharrell	Universal	
2014	"Happy"	Pharrell Williams	Sony	
2015	"Uptown Funk"	Mark Ronson featuring Bruno Mars	Sony	
2016	"7 Years"	Lukas Graham	Warner	
2017	"Shape of You"	Ed Sheeran	Warner	
2018	"This Is Me"	Keala Settle and The Greatest Showman Ensemble	Warner	
2019	"Dance Monkey"	Tones and I	Sony	
2020	"Blinding Lights"	The Weeknd	Universal	
2021	"Bad Habits"	Ed Sheeran	Warner	
2022	"Food Aid"	LadBaby	Sony	
2023	"Flowers"	Miley Cyrus	Sony	
2024	"Lose Control"	Teddy Swims	Warner	
2025	"Ordinary"	Alex Warren	Warner	

== See also ==
- Lists of UK Singles Downloads Chart number ones
- List of artists who reached number one on the UK Singles Downloads Chart
- UK singles chart
- UK Album Downloads Chart
