= You're Not Singing Any More =

Football chant

"You're Not Singing Any More" is a football chant in the UK used by the supporters of a team towards the other team's fans who have become silent for one reason or another, such as because they have just conceded a goal or had a player sent off.

It was used in an episode of the BBC television programme The Green Green Grass when Boycie found out that Elgin got less money than he expected in the Antiques Roadshow. It was also chanted by Mrs. Doyle and her friends during a football match in the Channel 4 Father Ted episode "Escape from Victory".

It was recently sung, in a rare cricket context, after Ben Stokes had brought about a historic and unlikely victory over Australia in the third Ashes test at Headingley in August of 2019, when the majority English crowd on the Western Terrace taunted the small Australian contingent.

The chant is simply that phrase repeated several times to the second half of the Welsh hymn tune "Cwm Rhondda".

An alternative version sung to the same tune is "Shall We Sing a Song for You?", which is also used when opposing fans have gone quiet.

"Cwm Rhondda"
The chants are sung to the second half of the Welsh hymn

== Typical lyrics ==
You're not singing
You're not singing
You're not singing any more
You're not sinnnngggginggg any more
