= Gab valve gear =

Early valve gear used on steam engines

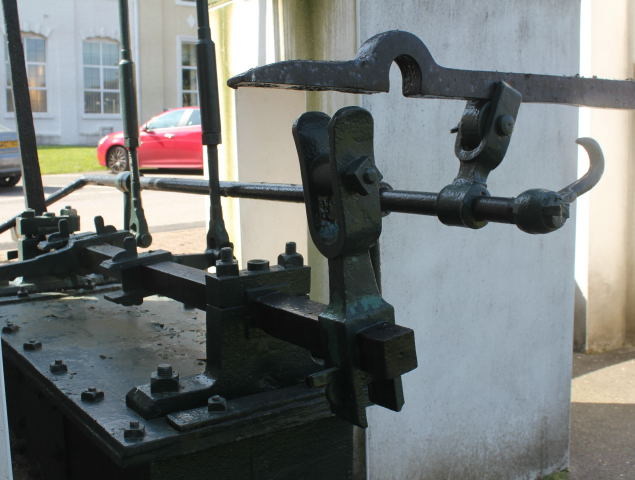
The valve gear gab of Calvert's beam engine, disengaged. The hooked rod from the right is driven by the eccentric. When engaged, it rocks the valve arbor, the square shaft, back and forth. Bellcranks behind the shaft work the valves via the vertical pullrods.

Gab valve gear was an early form of valve gear used on steam engines. Its simplest form allowed an engine to be stopped and started. A double form, mostly used on steam locomotives, allowed easy reversing.

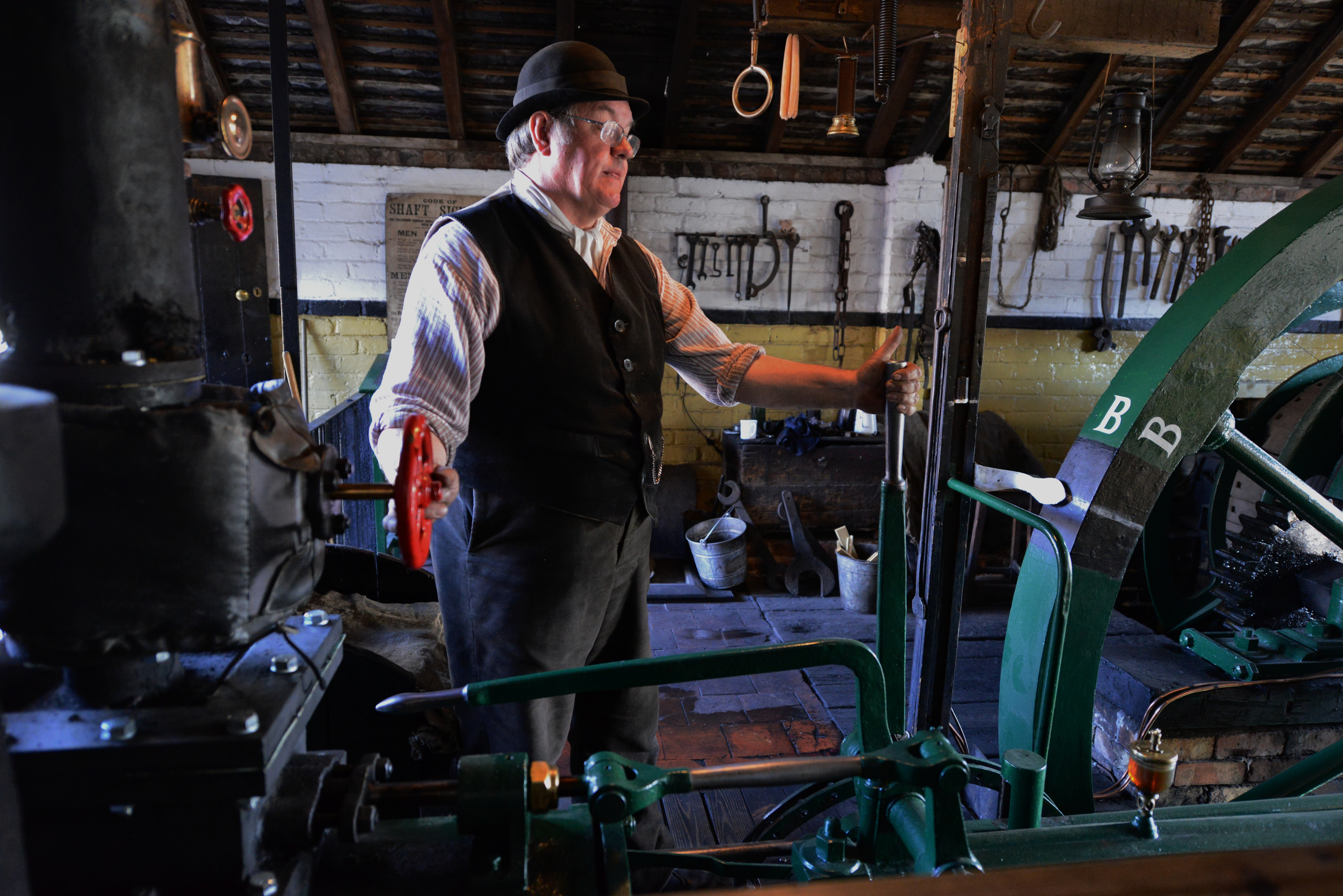
Winding engine at Blists Hill. The red handwheel is the steam stop valve, the lever in front of the engine driver disengages the valve gear gab.

== Etymology ==
The word gab or gabb may derive from a word for mouth, recorded by the Oxford English Dictionary from 1724, and probably medieval in origin from other forms related to gossip or idle chatter. The OED also gives the steam engine sense of gab as a notch in the valvegear as possibly being of Flemish origin, from the word gabbe. This is cited in the OED from 1792. The OED also cites the obviously derivative gab-lever from 1839.

== Origins ==
One of the first self-acting valve gears used for steam engines was the eccentric valve gear. This placed an eccentric on the engine's crankshaft, that in turn drove a strap and a long rod to the valve's actuating spindle. This was a simple valve gear but worked well for rotative engines that ran continuously for long periods, and in only one direction. For early mill engines this was acceptable.

== Gab valve gear ==
The simplest form of gab valve gear or 'gab clutch' was a simple notch in the valve rod, where it hooked over the valve spindle. A hand lever allowed this notch to be lifted, thus disengaging the valve drive and promptly stopping the engine.

=== Stationary engines ===
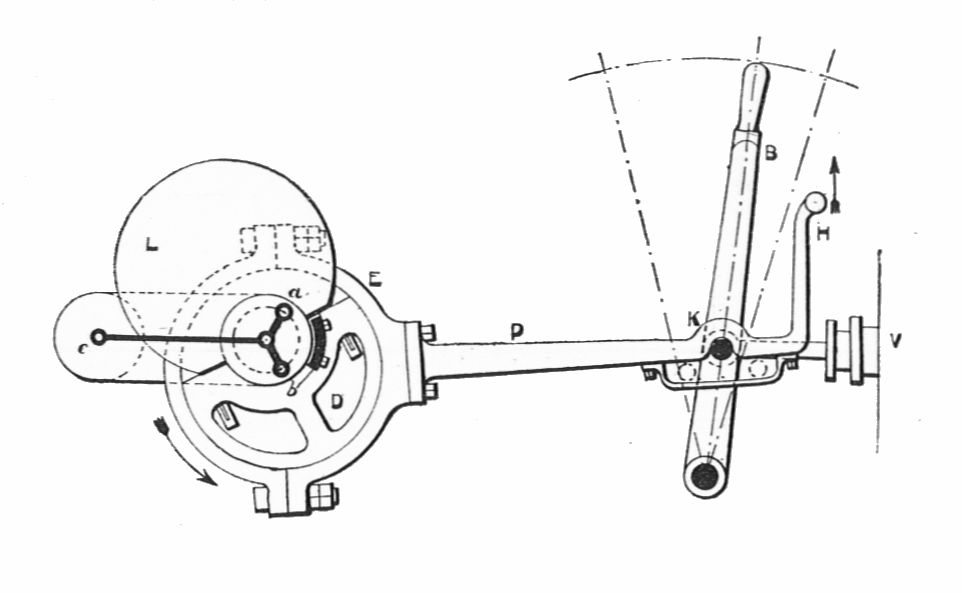
Loose eccentric reversing gear, with a rudimentary gab

Where an engine had to be stopped and started precisely, such as for a winding engine, it was useful to do this by means of the valve gear. This allows the engine to be stopped within a fraction of a revolution, where using a throttle or stop valve in the steam supply slowed the engine gradually and so would be far less precise.

Winding engines for mineshafts were required to be reversed, for hoisting and lowering of the shaft cage. These engines began by using the slip-eccentric valve gear, with a gab clutch. The eccentric is loose on the crankshaft and can rotate freely between two stops. These stops represent the positions for the eccentric to run the engine in each direction. When the gab was disengaged and the crankshaft stopped, the manual lever was used to drive the engine valves in reverse, which also re-set the eccentric to the opposing position. The gab could now be re-engaged and the engine restarted in the opposing direction.

=== Locomotives ===
With the development of the first steam locomotives, reversing was an obvious necessity. Stephenson’s Locomotion used slip-eccentrics although these were soon considered impractical, owing to the lack of access to the crank axles acting as both carrying axle and crankshaft. A somewhat contrived method used for the replica Locomotion is to display it on a track with raised ends, so that the locomotive can be allowed to roll backwards under its own weight, and re-setting its own eccentrics. A better solution was to use fixed eccentrics, but to provide two of them, one for each direction. The required eccentric, and direction, was selected by engaging only one gab at a time.

The first locomotive gab gears used two 'open' gabs, side by side, each potentially (when engaged) hooking over the same pin. If both gabs were ever engaged simultaneously these would jam, probably damaging the valve rod. On the footplate of a rattling locomotive with no suspension and a poor trackbed, this is known to have been the cause of breakdowns, whether by driver error or by a loose gab slipping into accidental engagement. As the gabs, unlike in the stationary engine, were remote from the driver they were provided with wide V-shaped jaws to help them engage with the pins.

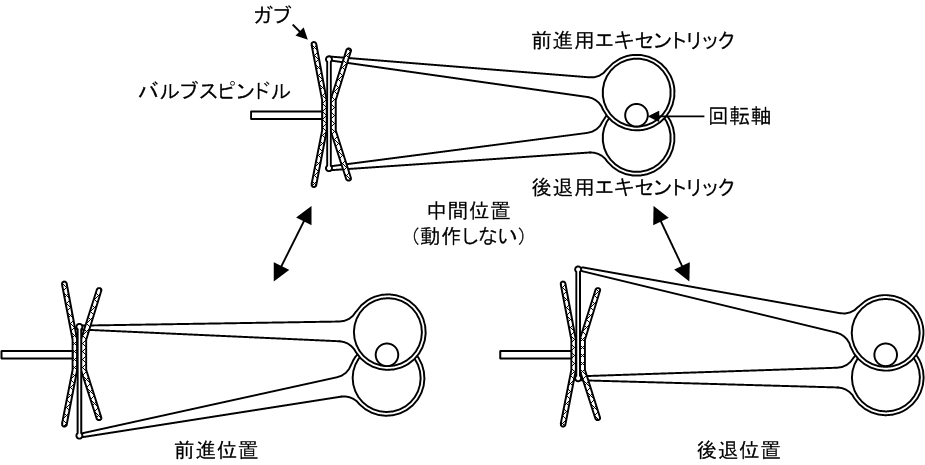
X-gab gear The upper position is in neutral, the lower positions in forward and reverse gear.

A better solution was to use a single double-sided gab. These were initially X-shaped and sat between the two connecting pins. X-gabs were also usually reversed, so that the gab was placed on the valve spindle and the pins were instead connected to the eccentric rods. The gab now stayed still vertically and the pins were moved up and down to engage them. This was done by joining both pins with a short vertical bar. The driver's reversing lever (Note: This was the first time that such a single lever control was used.) moved the centre of this bar, thus the pins, up and down to engage one at a time with opposite faces of the X-gab.

Another mechanism, used on Stephenson's locomotives in the 1830s, was the 'coupled gab'. Two open gabs were used, as for the manual open gab, although in this case they were both operated automatically by a single reversing lever. One was actuated by a bellcrank, the other through a reversing linkage from this, so that as one engaged the other was already lifted clear.

The final form of the gab valve gear was the 'closed' gab. Like the X-gab, this was a coupled pair of gabs, although in this case they faced inwards and there was a single pin between them. Once again, the gabs were driven by the eccentrics and the pin drove the valve spindle.

== Developments ==
The use of expansive working was already recognised for stationary engines, although this was usually only required for engines working under a constant load. By shutting off the supply of steam early, the steam within the cylinder was allowed to expand whilst doing work against the piston. This provided considerable savings in efficiency of both coal and water consumption. (Note: For railway locomotives of this period, the extra range permitted by reduced water consumption was perhaps even more valuable than the coal savings.) In 1844, William Williams, a pattern-maker for Stephenson, made the remarkable invention of realising that if a closed gab was made into a curved link, so that it fitted the pin closely throughout its travel, then the valve gear could also be set into an intermediate position, and that this would also have the effect of giving expansive working. This gear was the genesis of the well-known Stephenson valve gear.
