= John Hughes (1873–1932) =

Welsh composer (1873–1932)

- Born: 22 November 1873; Dowlais, Wales
- Died: 14 May 1932 (aged 58); Llantwit Fardre, Wales
- Occupation: Composer
- Notable work: Cwm Rhondda
- Spouse: Hannah Maria Hughes (m. 1905)
- Children: 2

John Hughes (22 November 1873 – 14 May 1932) was a Welsh composer of hymn tunes. He is most widely known for the tune Cwm Rhondda.

Hughes was born in Dowlais, and brought up in Llanilltud Faerdref (in English: Llantwit Fardre), Pontypridd. At the age of 12 he began work in Glynn Colliery in his home town and subsequently became a clerk at the Great Western Colliery Pontypridd where he worked for over 40 years. He served as a deacon and leader of the congregational singing in Salem Baptist Chapel in Llanilltud Faerdref.

The first version of his famous tune "Cwm Rhondda", originally named "Rhondda", was written in 1905 for the Cymanfa Ganu (hymn festival) in Pontypridd, when the enthusiasm of the 1904–1905 Welsh Revival still remained. The present form was developed for the inauguration of the organ at Capel Rhondda, in Hopkinstown in the Rhondda valley, in 1907. Hughes himself played the organ at this performance, using the English translation of William Williams' words because of the large number of English-speaking industrial workers who had immigrated to the area. Cwm Rhondda was put to words of William Williams 'Arglwydd arwain trwy'r anialwch' which translated as Guide me, O thou great Redeemer, one of the most celebrated of Welsh hymns it continues 'pilgrims through this barren land', referring to the plight of the Children of Israel condemned to wander in the desert wilderness. Popular in Welsh chapels, it became widely used in English services, and is still recalled to this day as one of the best church anthems.

A number of his other compositions were popular during his lifetime, but have not lasted. The name was changed from "Rhondda" to "Cwm Rhondda" by Harry Evans, of Dowlais, to avoid confusion with another tune by M. O. Jones.

As described by William Jensen Reynolds, Hughes worked his entire life in secular jobs, his worldwide fame as a composer of hymn tunes being the result of a hobby he pursued on the side. Like his father, who had a profound effect on him, Hughes participated actively as member and deacon in Tonteg's Salem Baptist Church. He died in Llantwit Fardre, aged 58.
