= Calvert's Engine =

Coordinates: 51.5881062°N 3.32557°W

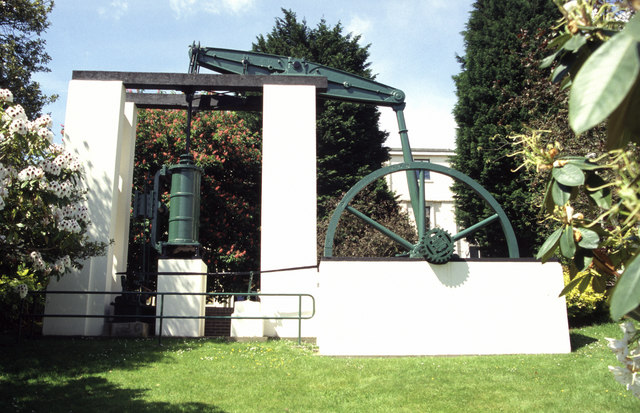
In 2004

Calvert's Engine or the Newbridge Colliery Engine is a beam engine of 1845, now preserved on the campus of the University of Glamorgan, South Wales.

== History ==
Newbridge Colliery in Gelliwion, Pontypridd was sunk in 1844. Its owner was John Calvert (1812–1890), a Yorkshireman, who would give his name to this engine. Calvert had previously been a railway contractor, the major contractor of the Taff Vale Railway, but after his initial distrust of Wales he remained in the area once the line opened and switched to mining. The winding engine was installed in 1845, in which year production began from the 55 yard No.3 Rhondda seam.

Winding was carried out with an iron flat chain, with wooden blocks through the links. The winding engine also powered the water pump for draining the mine. The pump was at the bottom of the shaft, worked by a vertical pump rod and linked to the engine by a 'tee bob'. Ventilation was by the bratticed split-shaft furnace method and so there was no fan engine for ventilation. (Note: This pre-dates the 1862 Hartley Colliery Disaster, which brought an end to single-shaft ventilation.) Later the winding chain was replaced by rope. Steam was supplied from an egg-ended boiler at a pressure of between 8–10 pounds per square inch (55–69 kPa).

The original engine was built in 1845 by the Varteg Ironworks of Cwmavon, near Blaenavon. (Note: Another comparable engine of 1845, from the Neath Abbey Ironworks, survives nearby at the Glyn Pits.) This was the first steam winding engine to be installed in the Rhondda valley.

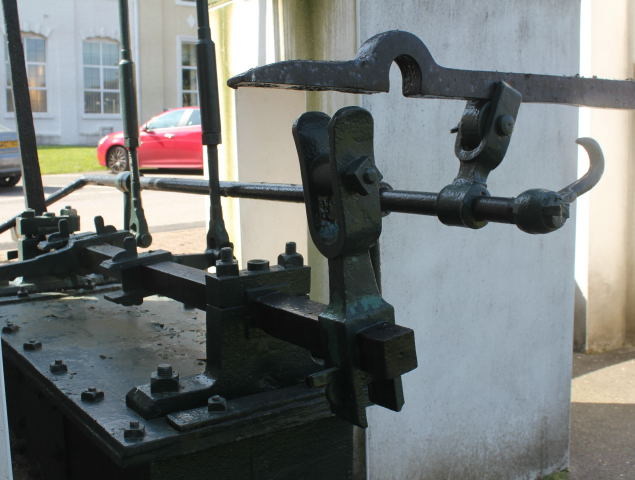
The valve gear gab The hooked rod from the right is driven by the eccentric. When engaged, it rocks the valve arbor, the square shaft, back and forth. Bellcranks behind the shaft work the valves via the vertical pullrods.

The cylinder was replaced in 1861 by Brown, Lenox and Co. of Newbridge Works, Pontypridd. This new cylinder was of 26.5 inches (670 mm) bore, 5 feet (1.5 m) stroke. Although the original bore is unknown, the stroke remained the same, as the crank was unchanged. Reversing is by slip eccentric and gab valve gear.

Similar engines were used for winding at both Glyn Pits and at Calvert's second pit, Gyfeillion, which would become the Great Western Colliery. Other dual-purpose engines were used at Welsh collieries at this time, but later it became more usual to use separate engines for each purpose.

By 1869, ownership of the mine had passed to the Fowler Brothers. In 1880 it was owned by the Newbridge and Rhondda Coal Company. Later the Crawshay family owned it.

At the end of the colliery's working, the Inspector of Mines' list of 1896 shows 489 employed there. The colliery closed in 1897 and the shaft was abandoned. (Note: Unlike some closed collieries, such as Glyn Pits, the shaft did not remain in use for other services, such as ventilation or water pumping.)

The engine and winding house lay derelict. A widely known postcard of 1912 shows the hose overgrown with ivy, but the engine beam still in place. There is some question as to when the engine finally worked. The 1897 closure is well documented, but many sources also state that the engine was last worked in 1919. It is not clear if this is an error, in either direction, or that the engine was re-started for a time, possibly during World War I and then closed soon after.

== Preservation ==
In 1913 a School of Mines was established for the Welsh coalfield. The school was owned and funded by the Welsh coal owners, through a levy of one tenth of a penny on each ton of coal produced by the companies involved. This South Wales and Monmouthshire School of Mines (Note: The legal status of Monmouthshire was somewhat unclear at this time, until the Local Government Act took effect in 1974. The Laws in Wales Acts (1542) had listed the counties of Wales but excluded Monmouthshire, leaving the county's status ambiguous for over four centuries.) was based in Forest House, built by the Crawshay family on the site of Fforest Isaf farm at Trefforest, Pontypridd. It served the large coal mining industry in the South Wales Valleys.

Around 1920 the engine was removed from the derelict colliery and re-erected nearby in the grounds of the School of Mines. This was a historical exhibit, more than a practical instruction. Engines of this type were thoroughly obsolete by this time. Although the last Cornish beam engines had been installed only a few years earlier, (Note: Hodbarrow Mine and Dorothea Quarry.) these were pumping engines, not rotative beam engines like this for winding.

The school went through several different names and statuses over the years. Most recently it was the University of Glamorgan, now part of the University of South Wales.

Surprisingly, Calvert's Engine is not listed in Crowley (1982), usually considered as one of the first standard works of modern-era steam preservation for such engines.
