= Capel Rhondda =

Chapel in Hopkinstown, Wales

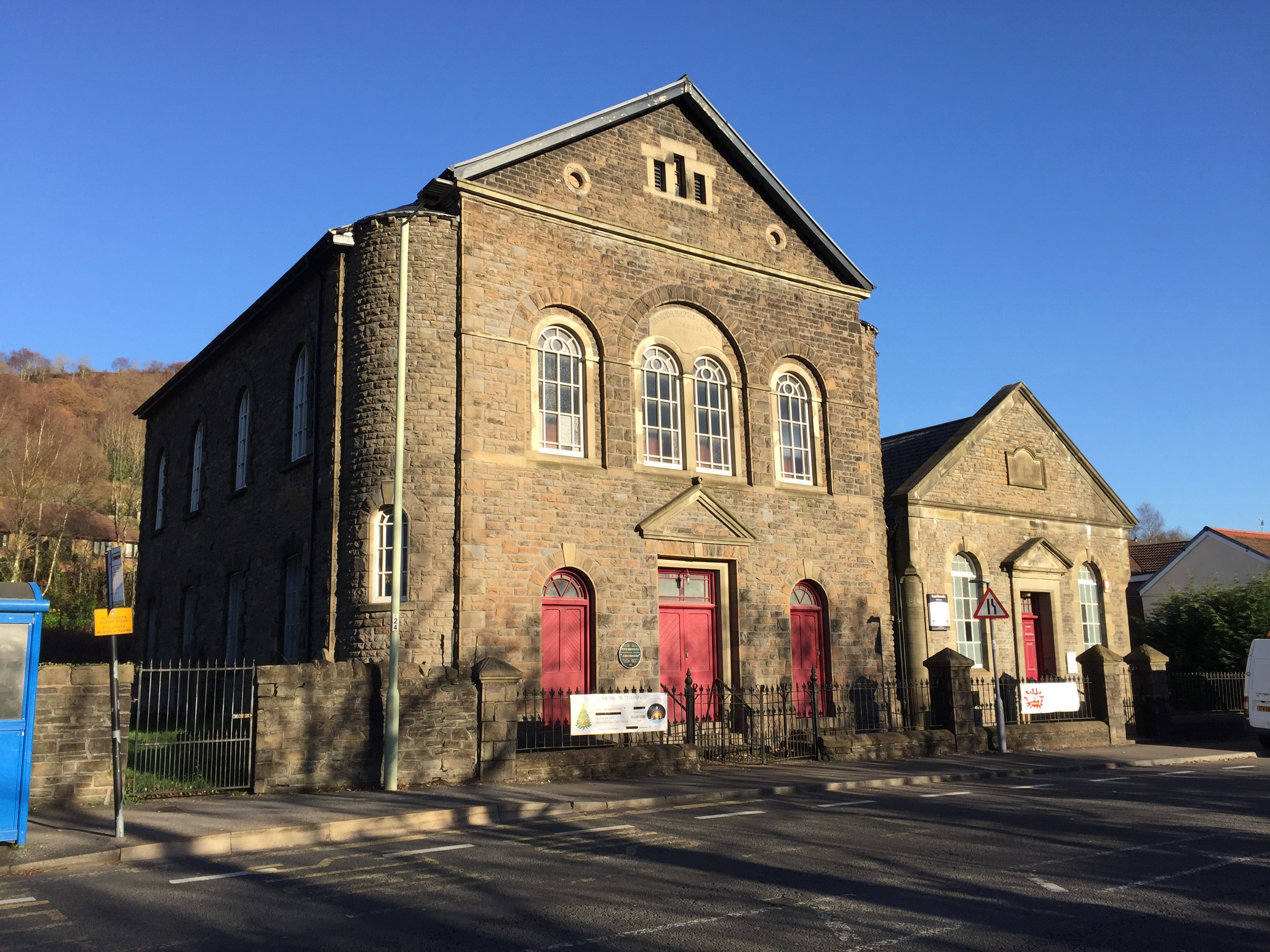

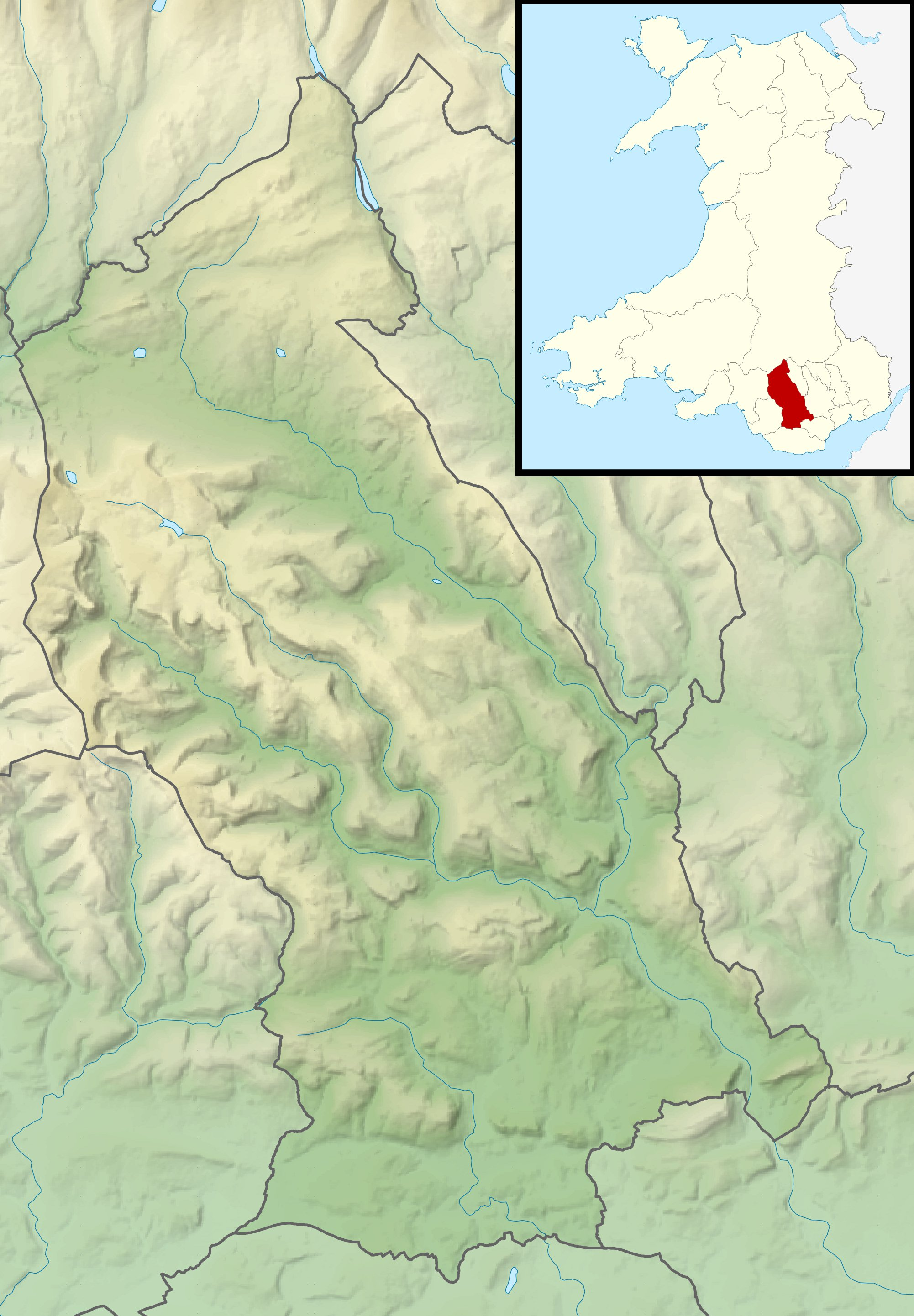
- Location within Rhondda Cynon Taf
- 51.6071°N 3.36°W
- Type: Chapel
- Location: Hopkinstown, Rhondda Cynon Taf, Wales

History
- Built: 1885

Site notes
- Architectural style: Italianate
- Governing body: Privately owned

Listed Building – Grade II
- Official name: Capel Rhondda
- Designated: 25 January 1966
- Reference no.: 24875

Capel Rhondda is a late 19th-century chapel in Hopkinstown, Rhondda Cynon Taf, Wales. The chapel was the site of the first performance of the hymn tune Cwm Rhondda on Sunday 1 November 1907. It is a Grade II listed building.

== History ==
Hopkinstown developed from the Tŷ Mawr Estate owned by an Evan Hopkin in the mid-19th century. Two coal mines were opened on what was previously an agricultural estate by a Yorkshire engineer, John Calvert, and by the 1870s the Great Western Colliery had developed into a major industrial complex in the area, comprising the mines, a chemical works and an iron foundry. A Baptist chapel was built in the village in 1852 to serve the spiritual needs of the workers, and in 1885 the present building was constructed as a, much larger, replacement. The evangelical revival in Wales which began in the 18th century and greatly extended its influence in the 19th saw nonconformism replace Anglicanism as the predominant religious faction and by the mid-19th century "the capel (chapel) took the place of the church in the lives of most people".

On Sunday 1 November 1907, the Welsh composer John Hughes played the organ in the Capel Rhondda at the first performance of the hymn tune Cwm Rhondda, written to commemorate the installation of the chapel's organ. (Note: The organ, which remains in situ, is by the Newcastle makers Blackett & Howden.) This tune is used for various hymns: perhaps the best known are Wele'n sefyll rhwng y myrtwydd and Arglwydd, arwain trwy'r anialwch; the latter was later translated into English as Guide me, O thou Great Redeemer, colloquially known as "Bread of Heaven", which is now commonly referenced as the unofficial second national anthem of Wales. (Note: Although Wales does not have an official national anthem, the song Hen Wlad Fy Nhadau is generally considered its unofficial anthem.)

In December 2024 the Baptist Union of Wales closed the chapel due to declining congregations and in 2025 placed it on the market for sale. Local campaigners initiated fundraising activities to buy the chapel and establish it as a community asset. By July 2025, the group had crowdfunded some £55,000 of the estimated £60,000 purchase costs, and in February 2026 the group announced they had secured ownership of the chapel.

In 2026 a programme was initiated to restore the chapel organ, in advance of the 120-year anniversary of its installation in 2027.

== Architecture and description ==
The chapel is three storeys with a three-bay frontage and a roof of Welsh slate. The adjoined Sunday School is later, of 1905 in date. The main construction material is Pennant sandstone. A plaque at the chapel commemorates the 1907 event. The interior is well preserved. Cadw describes the architectural style as "Classical", while the Royal Commission on the Ancient and Historical Monuments of Wales suggests Italianate. The chapel is a Grade II listed building.

== Sources ==
- Hilling, John B. (2018). The Architecture of Wales: From the First to the Twenty-first Century. Cardiff: University of Wales Press. ISBN 978-1-786-83284-9. OCLC 1034615762.
- Newman, John (2001). Glamorgan. The Buildings of Wales. London: Penguin Books. ISBN 978-0-300-09629-3.
