= Hopkinstown =

Coordinates: 51.605426°N 3.358087°W

Hopkinstown: Welsh: Trehopcyn
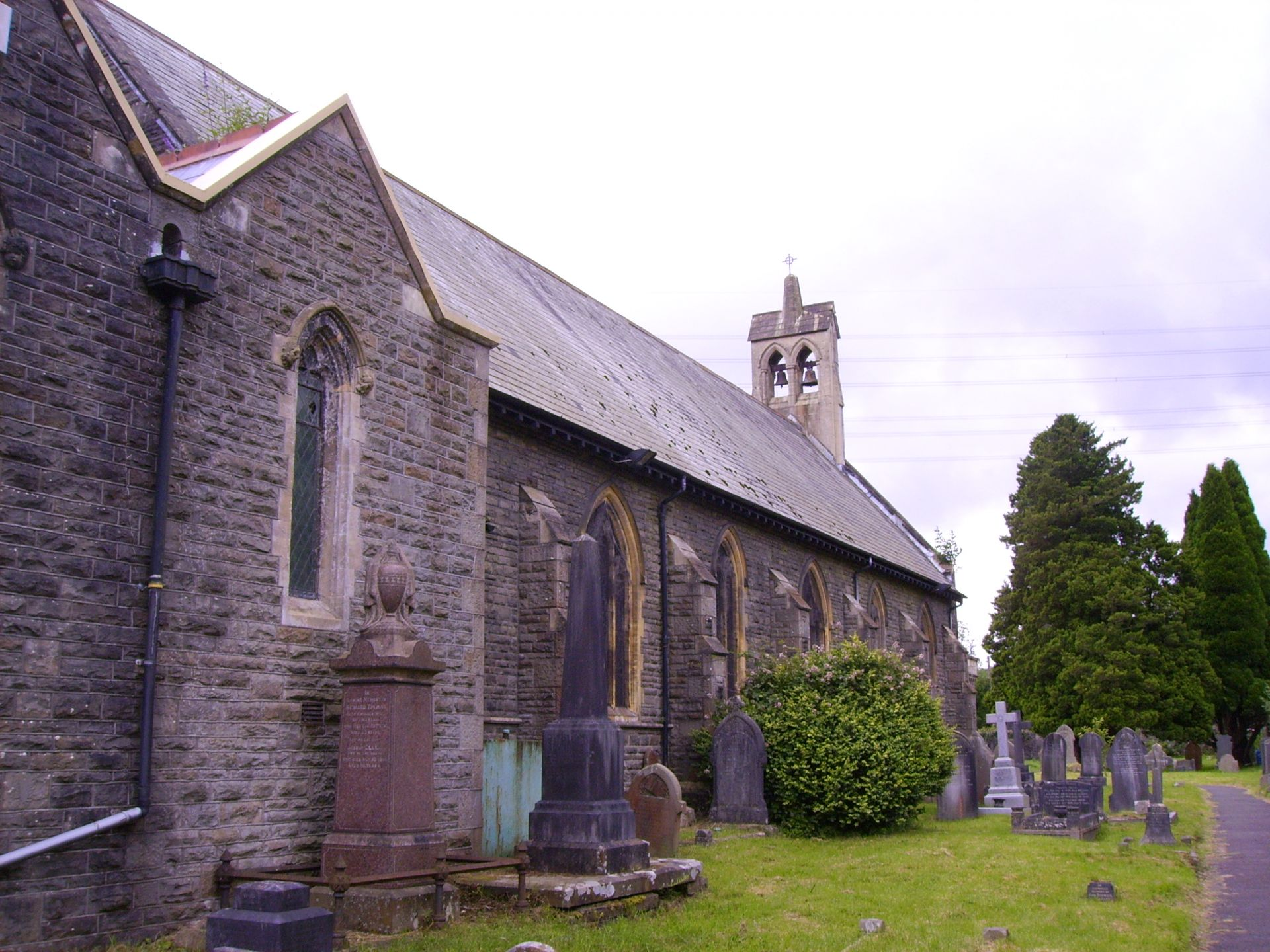
- Saint David's Church, Hopkinstown (closed Feb 2022)

- Location within Rhondda Cynon Taf
- OS grid reference: ST060904
- Principal area: Rhondda Cynon Taf
- Preserved county: Mid Glamorgan
- Country: Wales
- Sovereign state: United Kingdom
- Post town: PONTYPRIDD
- Postcode district: CF37
- Dialling code: 01443
- Police: South Wales
- Fire: South Wales
- Ambulance: Welsh
- UK Parliament: Pontypridd
- Senedd Cymru – Welsh Parliament: Pontypridd, South Wales Central Electoral Region

Hopkinstown (Welsh: Trehopcyn) is a small village to the west of Pontypridd in the county borough of Rhondda Cynon Taf, Wales, alongside the River Rhondda. Hopkinstown is a former coalmining and industrial community, now a district in the town of Pontypridd within the Rhondda electoral ward. Neighbouring settlements are Pwllgwaun, Trehafod and Pantygraigwen, and the sub-districts of Troed-Rhiw-Trwyn and Gyfeillion.

== Early and industrial history ==
The area where Hopkinstown is located was, as late as 1842, an undeveloped woodland known as the Ty Mawr Estate. Owned by Evan Hopkin, the area developed quickly, until around 1850 it was beginning to urbanise after the sinking of two collieries: Ty Mawr and Gyfeillion. Along with buildings to house the miners, Hopkinstown quickly acquired a chemical works, an iron foundry and coke ovens.

The original village was a single row of houses along the Rhondda Road that followed the river. Not until the 1871 census was the name Hopkin's Town used to describe it. By 1891 the village had a population of over 1,500 and several streets of terraced houses had been built. On Sunday 1 November 1907, the Welsh composer John Hughes played the organ in the Capel Rhondda in the village at the first performance of the hymn Cwm Rhondda, written to commemorate the installation of the chapel's organ.

Hopkinstown saw eight shafts sunk in the industrial period. John Calvert, an engineer from Yorkshire, had already sunk the Newbridge Colliery (later part of the Maritime Collieries, near Graig, Pontypridd), and in 1848 he funded the construction of the Gyfeillon Colliery. It passed to the Great Western Railway company, then reverted to Calvert before he sold it to the Great Western Colliery Company, which sank a total of six shafts known collectively as the Great Western Collieries.

Two other mines in the area, not owned by the Great Western, were the Typica Pit at Troed-rhiw-trwyn, which was only open for five years between 1875 and 1879, and the Lan Colliery, the only pit in Hopkinstown south of the River Rhondda. In 1889 it was owned by William Davies of Pontypridd, employing only seven miners, and was closed in September 1907.

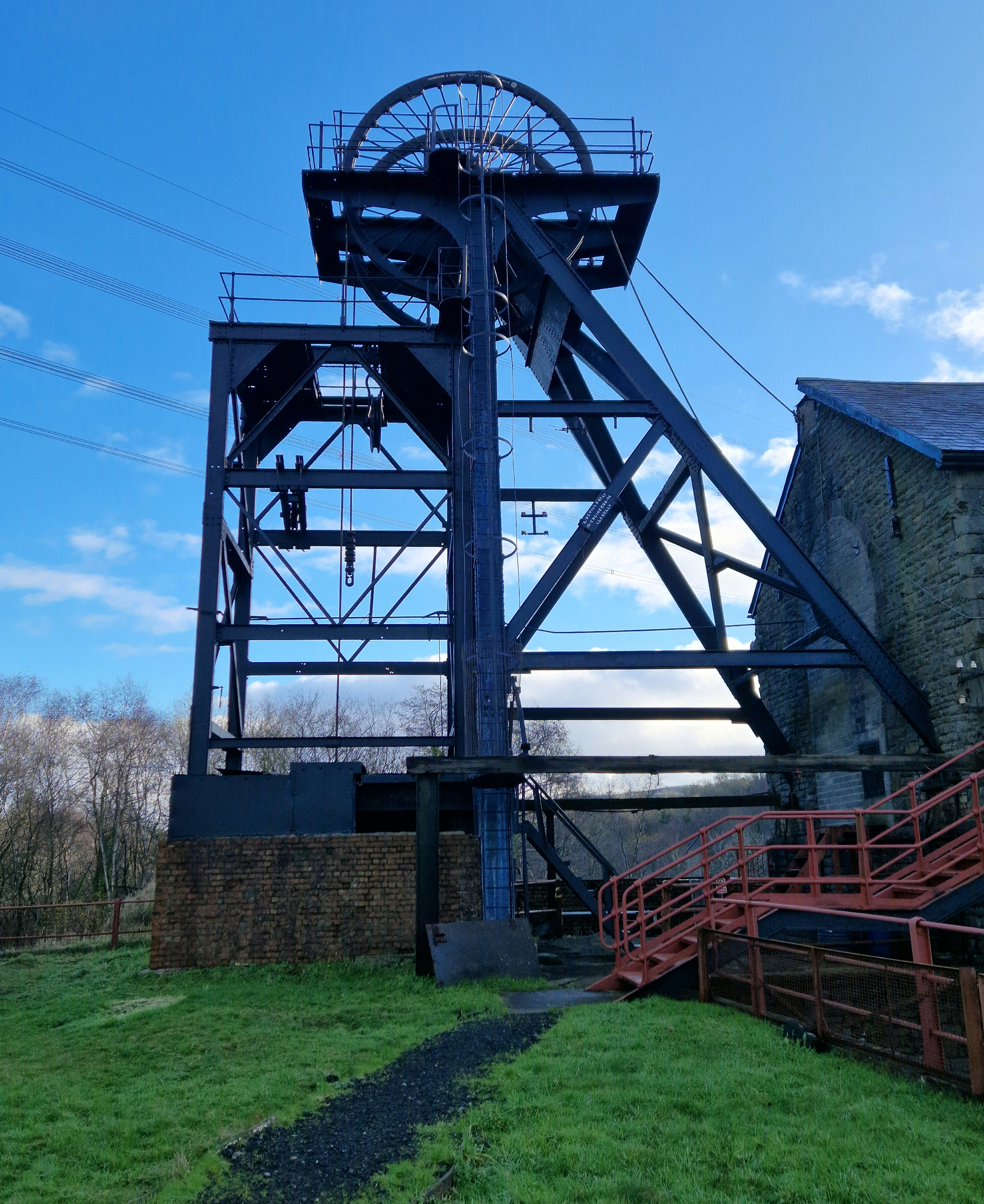
Headframe at the Great Western Colliery in Hopkinstown Wales uk

On Tuesday 11 April 1893, fire broke out in the Great Western Colliery, trapping some 200 miners underground. Although the majority were rescued, the death-toll was 63 men and boys.

On 23 January 1911 eleven people died in the Hopkinstown rail disaster, when a carriage carrying passengers collided with a stationary coal train on the Taff Vale Railway line.

== Notable residents ==
- Elaine Morgan (1920–2013), script-writer, populariser of science and feminist writer, was born in the village
- Steve Cooper (1979-), football player and manager
