= Great Western Colliery =

Coal mine in Wales

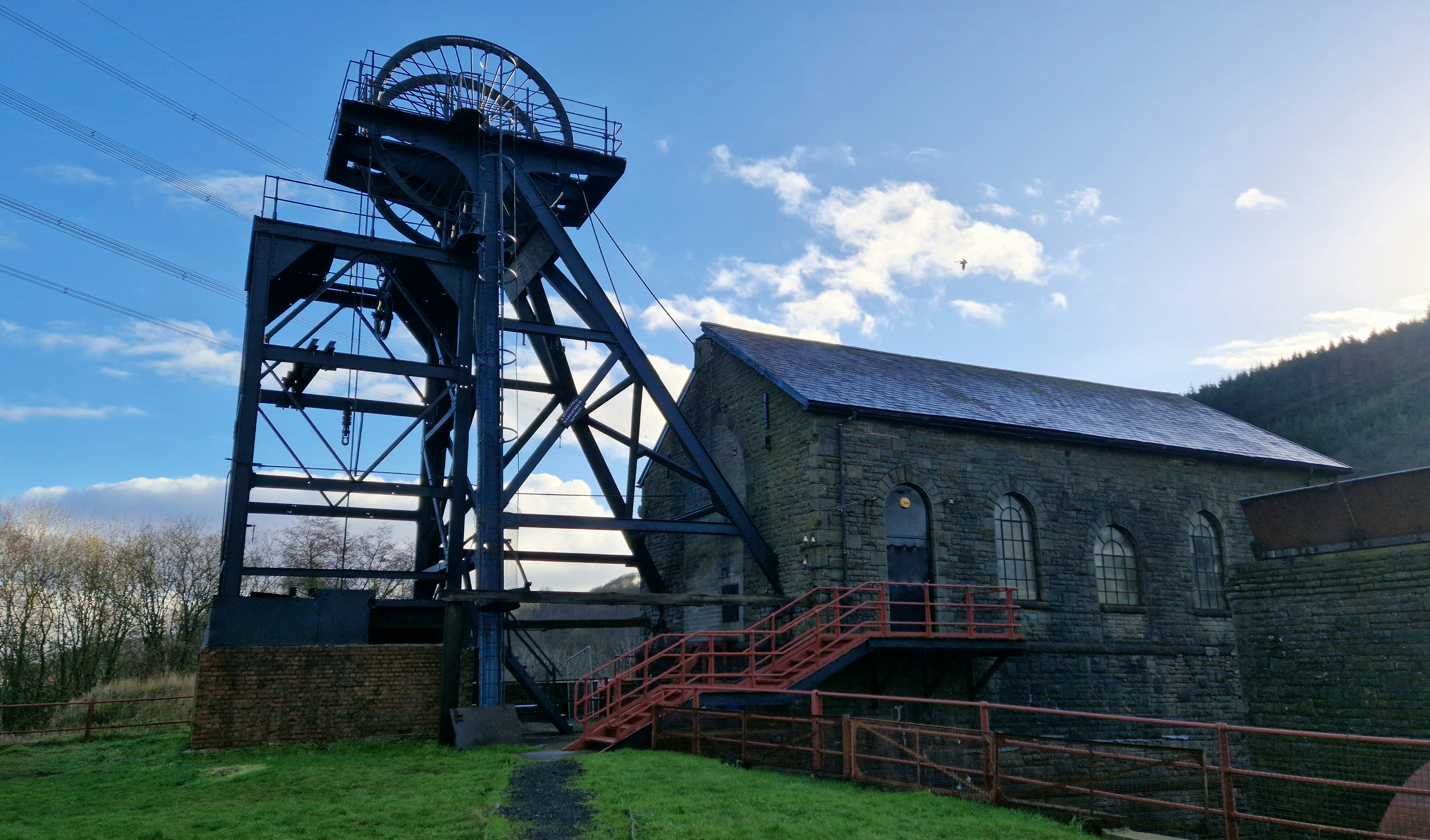

- Location within Wales
- Location: Hopkinstown, near Pontypridd, Glamorgan, Wales, United Kingdom; 51.6091°N 3.3665°W
- Products: Steam coal, House coal
- Production: 650,000 tons (1934)
- Type: Underground coal mine
- Greatest depth: 542 yards (No.2 Pit)
- Opened: August 1851
- Closed: November 26, 1983
- Company: John Calvert (1851–1854); Great Western Railway (1854–1865); Great Western Colliery Company (1865–1928); Powell Dyffryn Coal Company (1928–1947); National Coal Board (1947–1983)
- Website: Great Western Colliery Preservation Trust

Great Western Colliery, which included the shaft known as the Hetty Pit, was a coal mine located at Hopkinstown, near Pontypridd, Glamorgan in South Wales. Operating from 1851 to 1983, the mine was the site of a major disaster in 1893 that killed 63 miners. The surviving structures, including the headframe and winding engine house, are now protected as a scheduled monument with several buildings holding listed building status.

== History ==
=== Early development and John Calvert ===
The colliery was established in August 1851 by John Calvert, a Yorkshire railway contractor who had previously worked as the major contractor for Isambard Kingdom Brunel’s Taff Vale Railway construction in the 1840s. After initially being distrustful of Wales, Calvert remained in the area following completion of the railway in 1841 and switched his focus to mining operations.

Calvert had established his mining credentials with the successful Newbridge Colliery at Gelliwion, Pontypridd, which he sunk in 1844 to work the No.3 Rhondda seam at 55 yards depth. The colliery commenced production in 1845 using a sophisticated beam engine and proved highly profitable, providing the capital for his next venture. He initially named the new operation Gyfeillion Pit after the local area, with construction beginning in August 1848 and coal first struck in May 1851 at 149 yards depth.

The successful opening of Gyfeillion Pit was marked by a grand celebration in August 1851, funded by profits from Calvert's Newbridge operations. Contemporary accounts describe a lavish event featuring a roasted Hereford ox and processional ceremony, demonstrating the mine's promising commercial prospects and Calvert's confidence in the venture.

=== Great Western Railway involvement ===
However, after only three years of operation, Calvert found himself in financial difficulties and decided to sell the colliery and its coke oven plant to its major customer, the Great Western Railway Company, who bought the colliery after a three-month trial period in 1854.

The Great Western Railway operated the colliery directly from 1854 until 1864 at great profit, during which time they developed the site extensively and sank additional shafts. However, the railway company advertised the colliery for sale on 19 March 1864, as part of a broader rationalisation of their non-railway assets.

=== Great Western Colliery Company formation ===
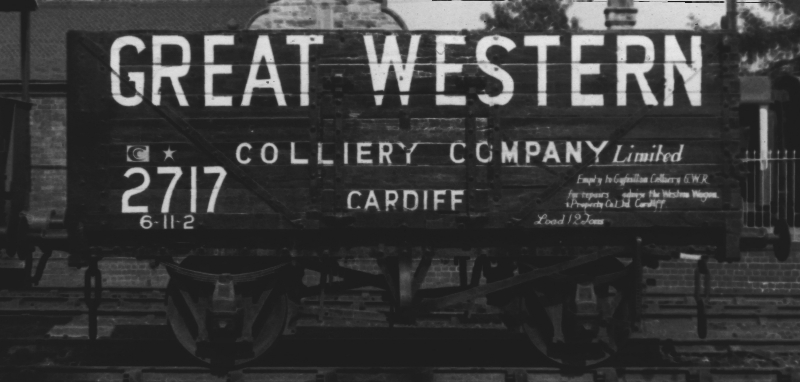
Great Western Colliery Company Mineral wagon

The sale process proved complex, with considerable delays before the colliery was finally transferred to new ownership on 1 April 1865. The purchasers formed the "Great Western & Fowlers United Collieries Ltd." on 1 June 1865, which was subsequently renamed "Great Western Colliery Co. Ltd." on 16 October 1866.

This new company undertook significant expansion of the mining operation, developing what became known as the Great Western Collieries complex. The company sank six shafts in total across the site, with the original colliery featuring three main shafts: Hetty Pit (initially used for downcast ventilation, later converted to upcast), Pit No. 2, and Pit No. 3 (used for downcast ventilation).

Financial difficulties led the Great Western Colliery Co. Ltd. into voluntary liquidation on 18 March 1878 "for reconstruction purposes". A new company of the same name was registered on 1 November 1878 to continue operations, demonstrating the ongoing commercial viability of the mining operation despite the corporate restructuring.

=== 1893 disaster ===
On Tuesday, 11 April 1893, a fire broke out in the colliery leading to one of the most significant mining disasters in Welsh history. The fire affected the workings in the Four Feet Seam to the east of the Hetty Pit, trapping approximately 200 miners underground. Rescue efforts succeeded in bringing 150 men to safety, but 63 men and boys lost their lives, with ages ranging from 14 to 61.

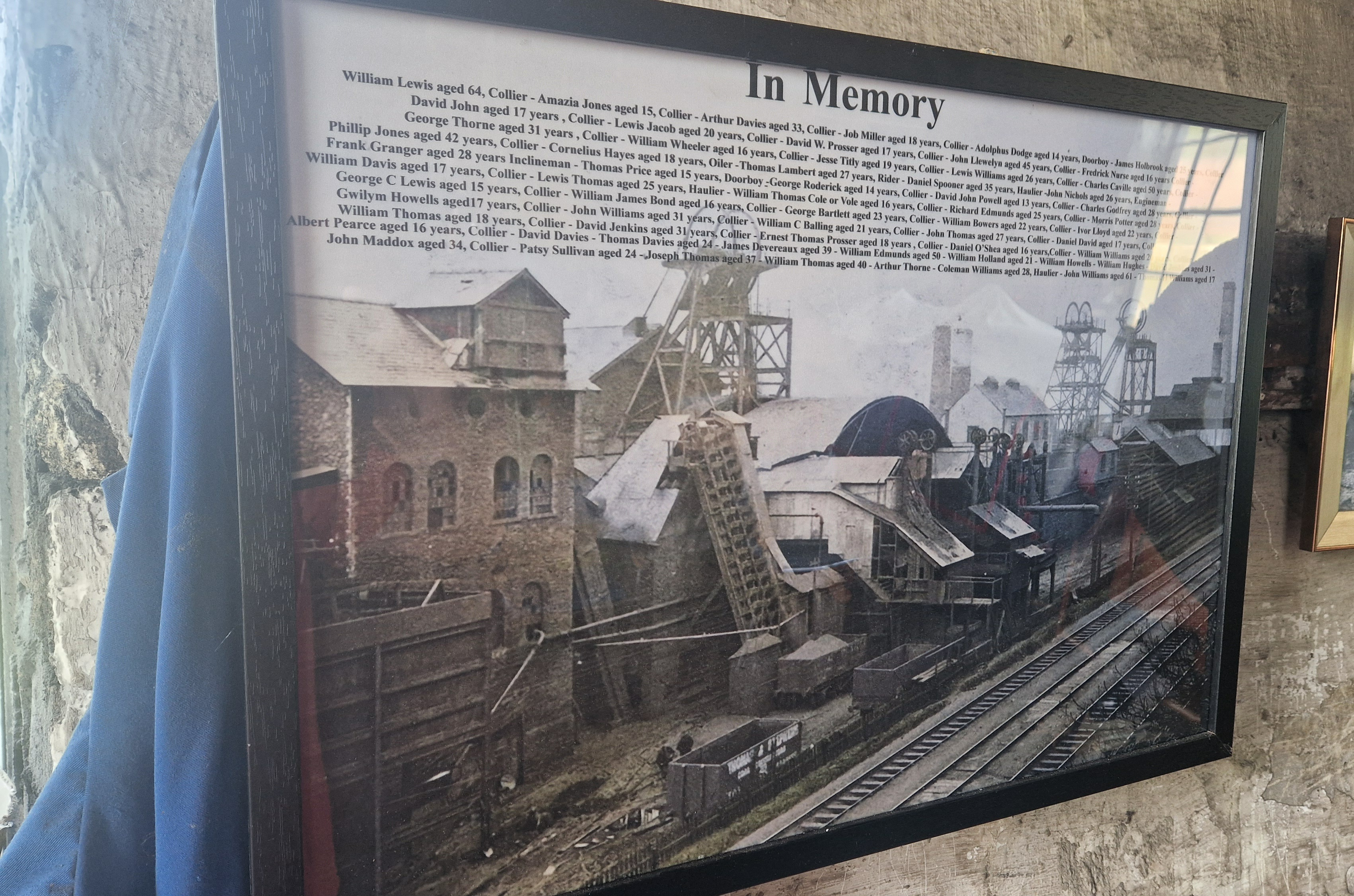
Disaster memorial on the wall of the engine house

The disaster occurred during the day shift when 950 of the colliery's approximately 1,460 workers were underground. Contemporary reports indicate that by 14 April, 53 bodies had been recovered from the affected workings. The fire originated at a haulage engine located in the East Hard Heading, about 120 yards from the Hetty Pit, where compressed air was used to power underground machinery from surface compressing equipment.

The colliery employed sophisticated ventilation systems including two Schiele fans, each of fifteen feet three inches diameter, positioned at the pit tops to maintain air circulation throughout the extensive underground workings. Despite these safety measures, the rapid spread of fire through the interconnected workings demonstrated the inherent dangers of large-scale underground coal extraction in the Victorian era.

=== Recovery and continued expansion ===
Following the 1893 disaster, the Great Western Colliery demonstrated resilience and continued to develop as one of the largest mining operations in the region. The Inspector of Mines' records show that by 1896, just three years after the disaster, employment had recovered to 475 men working at the Great Western No. 2 pit, with an additional 604 men employed at the Tymawr operation. This rapid recovery indicated both the quality of the coal reserves and the company's commitment to maintaining production.

The colliery underwent significant expansion during the early 20th century. By 1918, the Great Western employed a total workforce of 3,162 men across its various shafts, making it one of the largest employers in the Pontypridd area. The operation was restructured with specialised shaft functions: by 1923, Hetty No. 2 employed 683 men working the Nine Feet and Red seams, while Hetty No. 3 worked the Fforest Fach seam with 324 men. The Tymawr operation employed 1,143 men, extracting coal from the Five Feet, Four Feet, Lower Four Feet and Nine Feet seams.

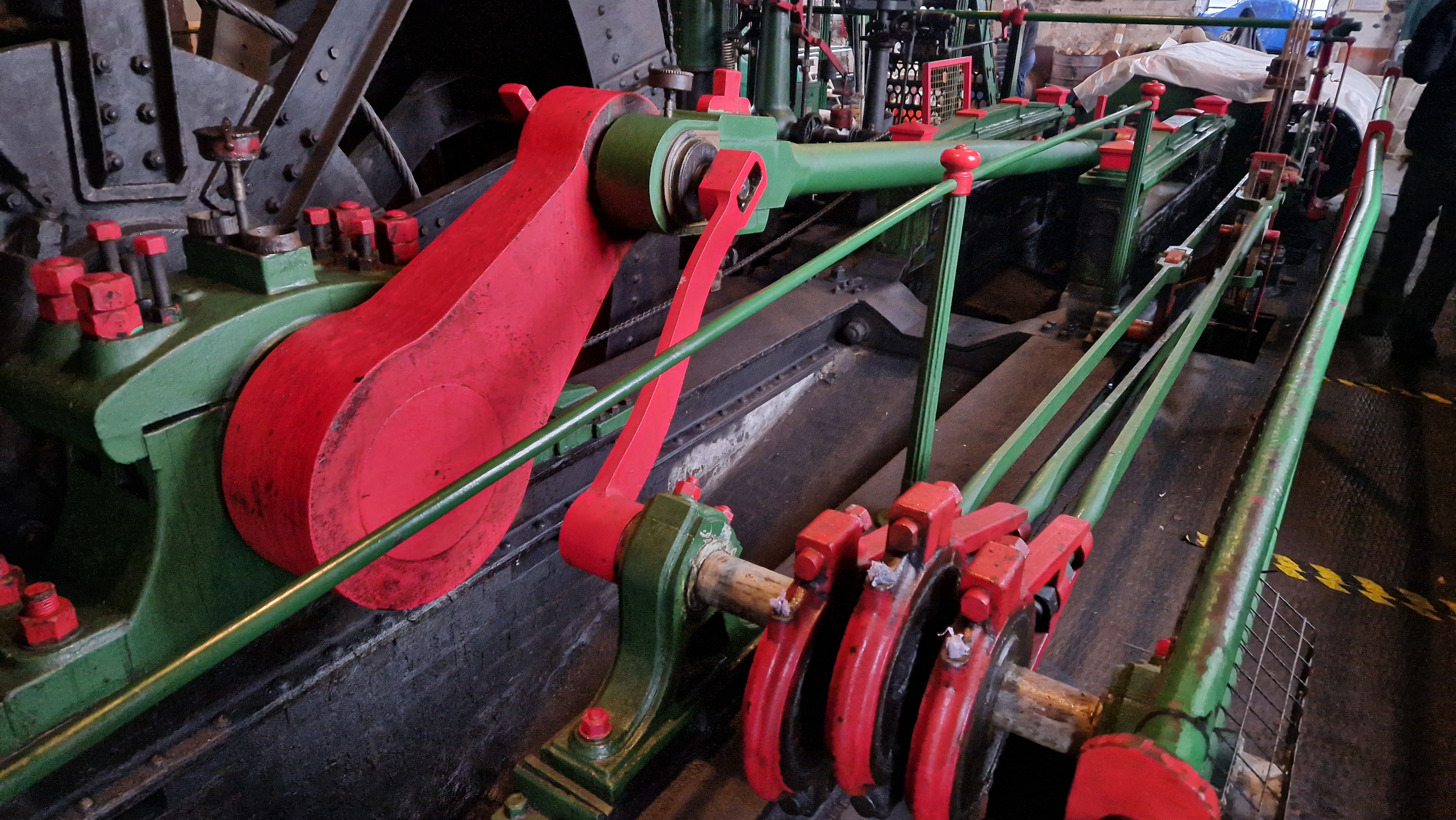
The winding engine

The Great Western Colliery Company sank the Hetty shaft to the Six Feet seam at 392 yards during the mid-1870s, with Shafts No. 2 and 3 following shortly afterwards. In 1890, the company deepened the old Tymawr shaft to reach the Five Feet seam at 500 yards, demonstrating ongoing investment in accessing deeper coal reserves.

=== Powell Duffryn ownership and modernisation ===
In 1928, the Great Western Colliery came under the ownership of the Powell Duffryn Coal Company, reflecting the broader consolidation trend in the Welsh coal industry. Powell Duffryn had expanded rapidly during the 1920s through acquisition of major Welsh mining operations, including the Rhymney Iron Company, Windsor Colliery, collieries from Lewis Merthyr, and the Great Western Colliery Company. Under Powell Duffryn's management, the Great Western Colliery was incorporated into a larger strategic operation.

By 1934, the Great Western Colliery Company (as a subsidiary of Powell Duffryn) controlled three collieries employing 2,270 men who produced 650,000 tons of coal annually. The company directors at this time included E.L. Hann, W.R. Hann, Sir Francis Kennedy McLean and Evan Williams.

This period saw significant modernisation efforts. The colliery benefited from Powell Duffryn's policy of concentrating investment in their most productive operations, with new shaft developments and improved surface facilities enhancing operational efficiency.

=== Nationalisation and final operations ===
The Great Western Colliery, along with the entire British coal industry, was nationalised on 1 January 1947 under the Coal Industry Nationalisation Act 1946, becoming part of the National Coal Board's South-Western Division. The NCB took control of 958 collieries across Britain, with the South Wales Coalfield operations forming a crucial part of the nationalised industry. A major reorganisation occurred in 1958 when the Lewis Merthyr Colliery, located a few miles northwest of the Great Western Collieries, amalgamated with the Great Western operation and connected underground as part of a £1.2 million integration scheme. At this point, coal production ceased at the Lewis Merthyr surface facilities, with materials and supplies continuing to be supplied via Lewis Merthyr Colliery Rhondda Heritage Park while coal extraction was redirected through the Tymawr shafts.

In 1969, the combined operations were officially renamed the "Tymawr and Lewis Merthyr Colliery", reflecting the integrated nature of the underground workings. The merged colliery formed part of the NCB's No. 3 (Rhondda) Area, No. 1 Group, alongside Lady Windsor and National collieries, with a combined workforce of 3,157 men producing 961,855 tons of coal in 1961.

The final phase of operations continued until 21 June 1983, when the last coal was raised at the Tymawr colliery, bringing to an end 132 years of mining operations that had begun with John Calvert's original Gyfeillion Pit in 1851. The colliery infrastructure was demolished soon after closure, though the Hetty Pit structures were preserved due to their historical and architectural significance.

== Post-closure and preservation ==
=== Heritage protection and early preservation efforts ===
Following the closure of the Tymawr and Lewis Merthyr complex on 26 November 1983, recognition of the historical significance of the Hetty Pit structures led to immediate protection measures. On 3 August 1984, both the Hetty Engine House and the Headframe were designated as Grade I listed buildings by Cadw, acknowledging their importance as part of Wales' coal heritage. The Fan House received Grade II* listing, reflecting its architectural and historical value.

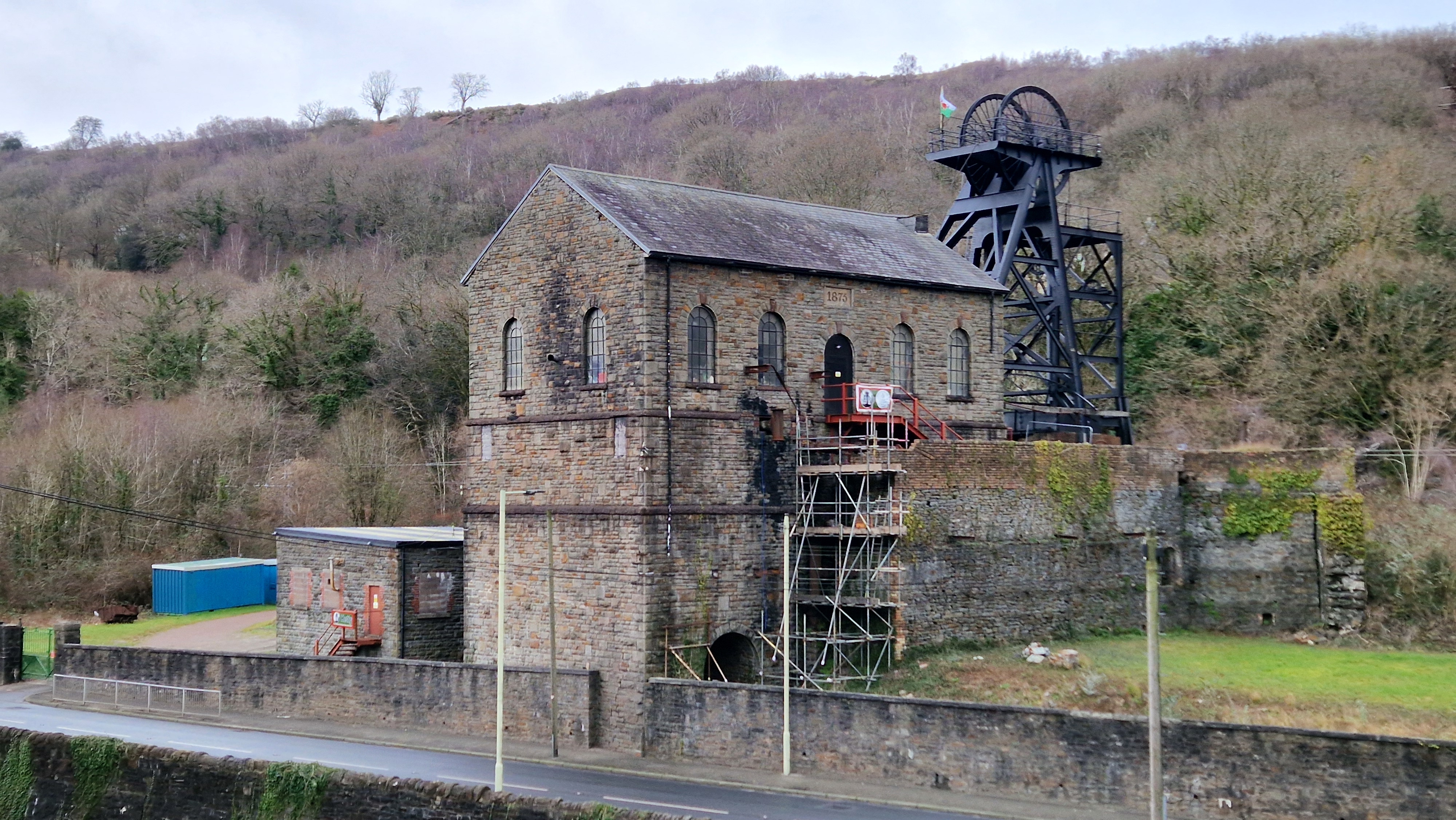
Great Western Colliery south side of the site in 2026

The protection was further strengthened on 28 July 1994 when the entire Hetty Engine House, Headframe, Fan House and surrounding area were granted Scheduled Monument status. The official designation stated that "The monument is of national importance for its potential to enhance knowledge of the nineteenth century coal mining industry."

Despite this legal protection, the Hetty site was effectively abandoned following closure and became victim to vandalism during the late 1980s and early 1990s. The buildings deteriorated significantly, with copper wire, brass fittings and other valuable materials being stolen, leaving the structures in poor condition.

=== Volunteer restoration programme ===
In the mid-1990s, a dedicated team of volunteers led by Brian Davies, curator of Pontypridd Museum, regained access to the abandoned site and began the process of restoring the winding engine to working order. This volunteer-led initiative represented the beginning of what would become a long-term preservation project extending over three decades.

The restoration work focused on returning the 1875 Hetty winding engine to operational condition. Originally powered by steam before being converted to compressed air, the engine represents significant industrial heritage as the only large steam engine in Wales still in working order and not dependent on an electric motor. It is also recognised as the oldest two-cylinder horizontal winding engine in the UK still situated on its original site.

The volunteers' efforts gradually transformed the site from a vandalised ruin into a functioning historical attraction. The work involved extensive mechanical restoration of the winding engine, built by Barker & Cope of Kidsgrove, Staffordshire, which had undergone modifications in 1902 and 1911 but retained much of its original 1875 engineering.

=== Formation of the Preservation Trust ===
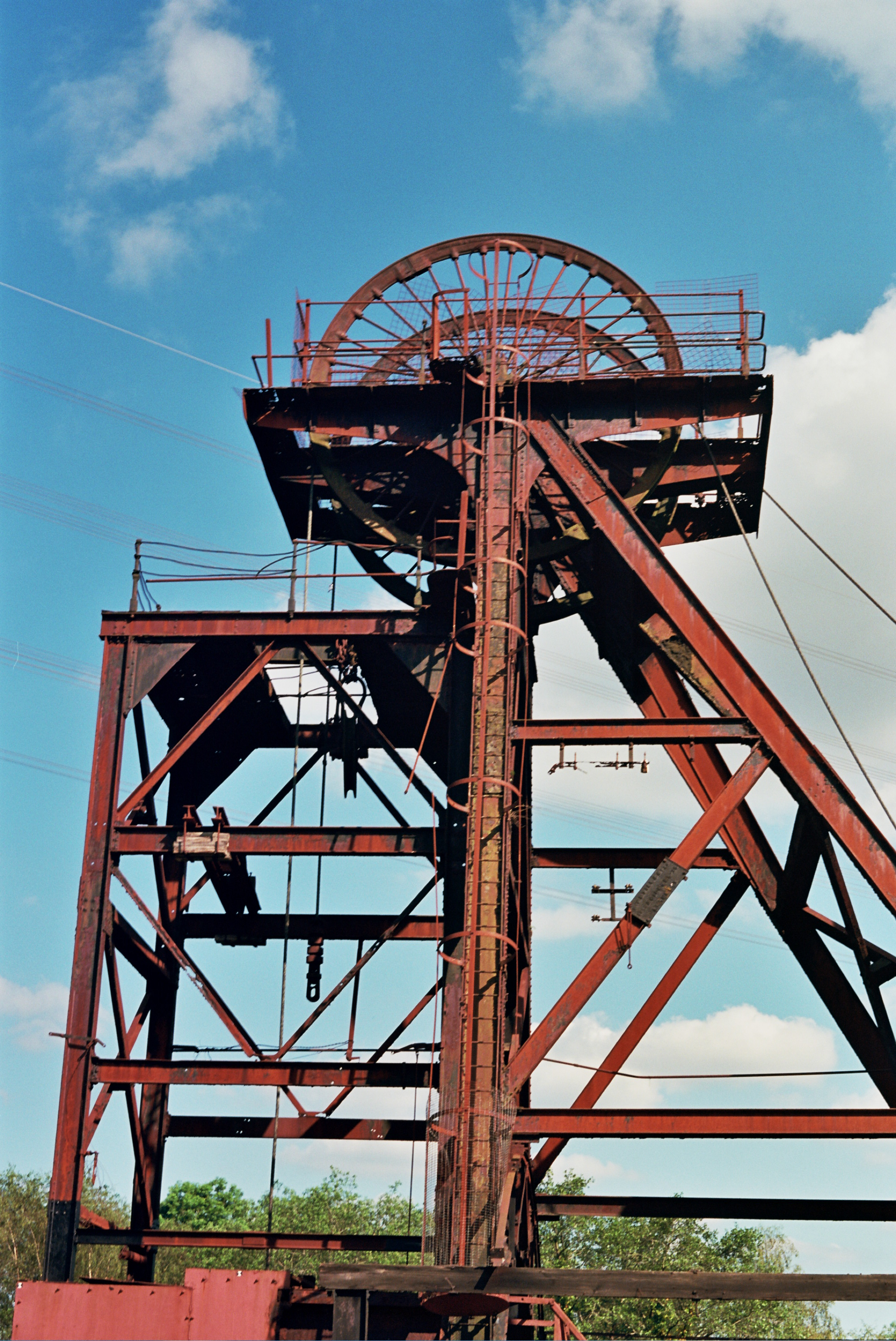
Great Western Colliery headframe before restoration.

The success of the volunteer restoration work led to the formal establishment of the Great Western Colliery Preservation Trust in 2010, continuing the heritage work that had begun in 1999. The Trust was incorporated as both a limited company and registered charity, providing a structured framework for the ongoing preservation and operation of the site.

Under the leadership of chairman Aubrey Green and following the death of Brian Davies, the Trust continued the restoration work with the goal of making the site more visitor-friendly and of interest to people from across the UK and Europe. The Trust's mission expanded beyond mere preservation to include education and public engagement with Wales' industrial heritage.

=== Lottery Heritage Fund support ===
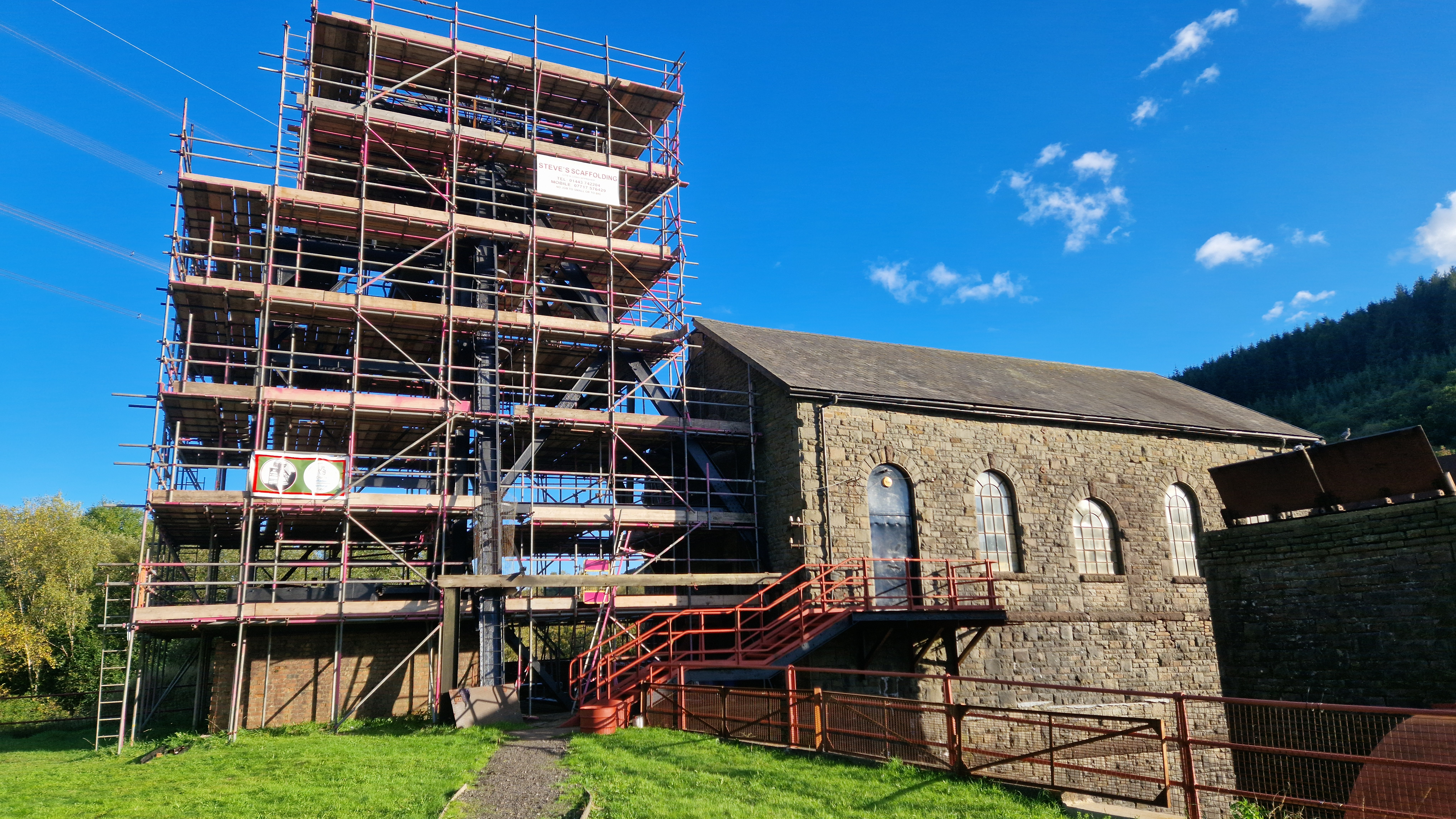
Great Western Colliery ongoing restoration September 2025

The preservation efforts received significant financial support through the National Lottery Heritage Fund. In 2018, the Trust was awarded a Resilient Heritage grant, followed by a major award of over £300,000 announced in 2024 for a comprehensive restoration project.

This funding enabled major improvements to the site, including refurbishment of the Grade I listed headframe, installation of a permanent air compressor to power the winding engine. Prior to this investment, the Trust had relied on hiring a compressor to operate the engine only occasionally for special demonstrations, now the engine can be run on demand. Improvements have also included repairs to infrastructure and enhanced visitor facilities. The project involved contractors replacing deteriorated sections of the headframe's lower levels and installing new access staircases for visitors. Further restoration and modernisation works are planned for the future, subject to the necessary funding being available.
