= Cwm Rhondda =

Welsh hymn tune

Cwm Rhondda Guide Me, O Thou Great Redeemer Guide Me, O Thou Great Jehovah
- Genre: Hymn
- Written: 1907
- Text: William Williams
- Based on: Isaiah 58:11
- Meter: 8.7.8.7.4.4.7.7
- Melody: John Hughes

A modernised version of 'Bread of Heaven', sung by John Owen-Jones

Traditional version, sung by Cymanfa Treforus

Cwm Rhondda is a popular hymn tune written by John Hughes (1873–1932) in 1907. The name is taken from the Welsh name for the Rhondda Valley.

It is usually used in English as a setting for William Williams' text "Guide me, O thou great Redeemer" (or, in some traditions, "Guide me, O Thou great Jehovah"), originally Arglwydd, arwain trwy'r anialwch ("Lord, lead me through the wilderness") in Welsh. The tune and hymn are often called "Bread of Heaven" because of a repeated line in this English translation.

For Welsh hymns, the tune is most commonly used as a setting for Wele'n sefyll rhwng y myrtwydd ("Lo, between the myrtles standing") by Ann Griffiths, and it was as a setting of this that the tune was first published in 1907. It is, however, sometimes paired with the text Arglwydd, arwain trwy'r anialwch, for example in the 2023 Revised English Hymnal where the text of this hymn appears in both English and Welsh.

== Tune ==
It is sometimes said that John Hughes wrote the first version of the tune, which he called "Rhondda", for a Cymanfa Ganu (hymn festival) in Pontypridd in 1905, but it is more likely that it was written for a festival there in 1907, when the enthusiasm of the 1904–1905 Welsh Revival still remained.

The present form was developed for the inauguration of the organ at Capel Rhondda, in Hopkinstown in the Rhondda Valley, in 1907. Hughes himself played the organ at this performance. The name was changed from "Rhondda" to "Cwm Rhondda" by Harry Evans, of Dowlais, to avoid confusion with another tune, by M. O. Jones.

The hymn is usually pitched in A-flat major (or G major in most hymnals) and has the 8.7.8.7.4.4.7.7 measure which is common in Welsh hymns. The third line repeats the first and the fourth line develops the second. The fifth line normally involves a repeat of the four-syllable text and the sixth reaches a climax on a dominant seventh chord (bar 12) – emphasised by a rising arpeggio in the alto and bass parts. The final line continues the musical development of the second and fourth (and generally carries a repeat of the text of the sixth). On account of these vigorous characteristics, the tune was resisted for some time in both Welsh and English collections but has long been firmly established.

== Hymn text: 'Guide me, O Thou great Redeemer' ==
=== Present-day ===
The following are the English and Welsh versions of the hymn, as given in the standard modern collections, based on a verse in the Book of Isaiah (Isaiah 58:11). These English lyrics may also be interpreted as referencing the Eucharist (specifically as described in the Bread of Life Discourse) and the Holy Spirit (the Water of Life), making it a popular hymn during communion prayer. It is especially popular in Anglican churches, and is particularly associated with the Church in Wales.

Guide me, O thou great Redeemer,
pilgrim through this barren land;
I am weak, but thou art mighty;
hold me with thy powerful hand:
Bread of heaven,
feed me 'till I want no more.*

Open now the crystal fountain
whence the healing stream doth flow;
let the fire and cloudy pillar
lead me all my journey through:
Strong Deliverer,
be thou still my strength and shield.

When I tread the verge of Jordan,
bid my anxious fears subside;
death of death, and hell's destruction
land me safe on Canaan's side:
songs of praises
I will ever give to thee!

- *This line actually means "feed me till I am no longer needy", but in some hymnals, verse 1 line 6 may read as "feed me now and evermore".

— Hymns and Psalms

Arglwydd, arwain trwy'r anialwch,
Fi, bererin gwael ei wedd,
Nad oes ynof nerth na bywyd
Fel yn gorwedd yn y bedd:
Hollalluog, Hollalluog,
Ydyw'r Un a'm cwyd i'r lan.
Ydyw'r Un a'm cwyd i'r lan

Agor y ffynhonnau melus
'N tarddu i maes o'r Graig y sydd;
Colofn dân rho'r nos i'm harwain,
A rho golofn niwl y dydd;
Rho i mi fanna, Rho i mi fanna,
Fel na bwyf yn llwfwrhau.
Fel na bwyf yn llwfwrhau.

Pan yn troedio glan Iorddonen,
Par i'm hofnau suddo i gyd;
Dwg fi drwy y tonnau geirwon
Draw i Ganaan – gartref clyd:
Mawl diderfyn. Mawl diderfyn
Fydd i'th enw byth am hyn.
Fydd i'th enw byth am hyn.

Translation:

Lord, lead me through the wilderness,
Me, a pilgrim of poor appearance,
I don't have strength or life in me,
Like lying in the grave:
Omnipotent, Omnipotent
Is the one who brings me to the shore.
Is the one who brings me to the shore.

Open the sweet fountains
Flowing from the Rock that is;
Give a column of fire to lead me at night,
And give a column of fog during the day.
Give me manna. Give me manna,
So that I shall not falter.
So that I shall not falter.

When I walk the bank of the Jordan,
Cause all my fears to sink;
Take me through the roughest waves
Over to Canaan, a cosy home:
Unending praise. Unending praise
Will be to Your name for this.
Will be to Your name for this.

The Welsh version shown above is a somewhat literal re-translation from the English version back into Welsh. Earlier versions of the hymn book published jointly by the Calvinistic and Wesleyan Methodists had a version with five verses (i.e. omitting verse two of the six given in the History section below) that was otherwise much closer to Pantycelyn's original Welsh text.

=== History ===
William Williams Pantycelyn (named, in the Welsh style, "Pantycelyn" after the farm which his wife inherited) is generally acknowledged as the greatest Welsh hymnwriter. The Welsh original of this hymn was first published as Hymn 10 in Mor o Wydr (Sea of Glass) in 1762. It comprised six verses. (References to a five verse version in Pantycelyn's Alleluia of 1745 appear to be incorrect.) It was originally titled Gweddi am Nerth i fyned trwy anialwch y Byd (Prayer for strength for the journey through the world's wilderness).

Peter Williams (1722–1796) (Note: Peter Williams was no relation of the author but was well known for his popular edition of the Welsh Bible, with notes) translated the hymn which was published in Hymns on various subjects, 1771, with the title Prayer for Strength. This translation is the only Welsh hymn to have gained widespread circulation in the English-speaking world. The present-day Welsh version, given above, is essentially a redaction of the original to parallel Peter Williams's English version. A result of the translation process is that the now-familiar phrase "Bread of heaven" does not actually occur in the original; it is a paraphrase of the references to manna.

The Welsh word Arglwydd corresponds to the English Lord. Peter Williams used Jehovah in his translation of the lyrics. Although some English-language hymnals today have replaced "Jehovah" with "Redeemer", it's common to see the hymn with the original English translation that includes the Divine Name.

The following version of the original is taken from Gwaith Pantycelyn (The Works of Pantycelyn). All but the second verse is given, with minor variations, in the Welsh Hymnbook of the Calvinist and Wesleyan Methodists, published by the assemblies of the two churches. (The variations are mainly to update the language, e.g. in verse 1 ynwyf (elided to ynwy'), meaning "in [me]", has become ynof in more modern Welsh.)

Arglwydd, arwain trwy'r anialwch
Fi, bererin gwael ei wedd,
Nad oes ynwy' nerth na bywyd
Fel yn gorwedd yn y bedd:
Hollalluog
Ydyw'r Un a'm cwyd i'r lan.

Myfi grwydrais hir flynyddau,
Ac heb weled codi'r wawr;
Anobaithiais, heb dy allu,
Ddod o'r anial dir yn awr;
Dere dy hunan
Dyna'r pryd y dof i maes.

Rho'r golofn dannos i'm harwain,
A'r golofn niwl y dydd;
Dal fi pan bwy'n teithio'r mannau
Geirwon yn fy ffordd y sydd:
Rho i mi fanna
Fel na bwyf i lwfwrhau.

Agor y ffynhonnau melys
Sydd yn tarddu o'r graig i maes;
'R hyd yr anial mawr canlyned
Afon iechydwriaeth gras:
Rho imi hynny,
Dim imi ond dy fwynhau.

Pan fwy'n myned trwy'r Iorddonen -
Angau creulon yn ei rym -
Ti est trwyddi gynt dy Hunan,
Pam yr ofnaf bellach ddim?
Buddugoliaeth!
Gwna imi weiddi yn y llif.

Mi ymddirieda' yn dy allu,
Mawr yw'r gwaith a wnest erioed:
Ti gest angau, ti gest uffern,
Ti gest Satan dan dy droed:
Pen Calfaria,
Nac aed hwnw byth o'm cof.

Translation:

Lord, guide me through the wilderness,
A pilgrim weak of aspect,
There is neither strength nor life in me,
As though lying in the grave,
[but] Almighty,
It is Thou who shalt take me to that shore.

I wandered for long years,
And saw not the break of dawn;
I despaired, without Thy strength,
Ever to leave the desert land;
Do Thou grant,
The occasion to escape.

Give Thou a pillar of fire to lead me in the night,
And a pillar of mist in the day,
Hold me when I travel places
Which are rough on the way,
Give me manna,
Thus shall I not despair.

Open the sweet springs
Which gush forth from the rock,
All across the great wilderness
May a river of healing grace follow:
Give this to me
Not for me but for Thy sake.

When I go through Jordan –
Cruel death in its force –
Thou Thyself suffered this before,
Why shall I fear further?
Victory!
Let me cry out in the torrent.

I shall trust in Thy power,
Great is the work that Thou hast always done,
Thou conquered death, Thou conquered hell,
Thou hast crushed Satan beneath Thy feet,
Hill of Calvary,
This shall never escape from my memory.

=== Meanings ===
The hymn describes the experience of God's people in their travel through the wilderness from the escape from slavery in Egypt (Exodus 12–14), being guided by a cloud by day and a fire by night (Exodus 13:17–22) to their final arrival forty years later in the land of Canaan (Joshua 3). During this time their needs were supplied by God, including the daily supply of manna (Exodus 16).

The hymn text forms an allegory for the journey of a Christian throughout their life on earth (described as a "barren land") requiring the Redeemer's guidance and provision; specifically, provision through the Eucharist ("bread of heaven", see John 6:22-71) and the Holy Spirit (described as a "healing stream" after John 7:38). The hymn closes triumphantly, ending with the Christian passing through death ("verge of Jordan", a common metaphor for death,) and, through Christ's ultimate victory ("death of death and hell's destruction"), being brought up at last to Heaven ("Canaan's side").

=== Instances of use ===
The hymn has been sung on various British state occasions, such as the funerals of Diana, Princess of Wales and Queen Elizabeth The Queen Mother, and the weddings of Prince William and Catherine Middleton and Prince Harry and Meghan Markle, and also the service of reflection for Queen Elizabeth II in Wales at 2022.

The hymn is also featured prominently in the soundtrack to the 1941 film How Green Was My Valley, directed by John Ford, using the version given in "History" above. The soundtrack, by Alfred Newman, won that year's Academy Award for Original Music Score. It is also featured at the beginning of The African Queen, with Katharine Hepburn singing and playing the organ. Only Men Aloud! also sang an arrangement by Tim Rhys-Evans and Jeffrey Howard on the BBC 1 Show Last Choir Standing in 2008. They subsequently released it on their self-titled début album.

The hymn was the informal anthem of Wales in the "Green and Pleasant Land" section of the 2012 Summer Olympics opening ceremony. The hymn is also used by freemasons of the United Grand Lodge of England.

The BBC sitcom One Foot in the Grave used the song in the episode "The Beast In The Cage". The lyrics were altered to be about the main character, Victor Meldrew.

== Hymn text: 'Wele'n sefyll rhwng y myrtwydd' ==
Despite the history of the tune and its common English text, the usual tune-words pairing in Welsh is quite different. Arglwydd, arwain... is usually sung to the tune Capel y Ddôl and Cwm Rhondda is the setting for the hymn Wele'n Sefyll Rwng y Myrtwydd by Ann Griffiths:

Wele'n sefyll rhwng y myrtwydd
Wrthrych teilwng o fy mryd;
Er o'r braidd 'rwy'n Ei adnabod
Ef uwchlaw gwrthrychau'r byd:
Henffych fore
Caf ei weled fel y mae.

Rhosyn Saron yw Ei enw,
Gwyn a gwridog, hardd Ei bryd!
Ar ddeng mil y mae'n rhagori
O wrthddrychau penna'r byd;
Ffrind pechadur,
Dyma'r llywydd ar y môr.

Beth sydd imi mwy a wnelwyf
Ag eilunod gwael y llawr?
Tystio 'r wyf nad yw eu cwmni
I'w gymharu a'm Iesu Mawr.
O, am aros
Yn Ei gariad ddyddiau f'oes!

Translation:

Lo, between the myrtles standing,
Christ, the One my soul doth praise;
though in part, I know His glory
high above all earthly grace.
In the morning,
may I see his smiling face.

Rose of Sharon is His title,
bright and glorious, fair to see;
over tens of thousands shining,
far above all treasures, He.
Friend of sinners,
pilot on life’s stormy sea.

What have I to do henceforward
with vain idols I won’t love?
I will testify that nothing
can compare with Christ above.
May he keep me
all my lifetime in His love.

== Other English hymn texts ==
Some hymnals use this tune for the hymn "God of Grace and God of Glory" written by Harry Emerson Fosdick in 1930.

Others use it for "Full salvation! Full salvation! Lo, the fountain opened wide" by Francis Bottome (1823–1894).

== Legacy ==
In 2007 a plaque was unveiled at Capel Rhondda in Hopkinstown, Pontypridd, to celebrate the centenary of the hymn's composition. At the ceremony the Reverend Phil Rickards recalled that Hopkinstown was the site of the song's first public performance. A service celebrating the centenary was also held at John Hughes' burial place, Salem Baptist Chapel in nearby Tonteg.

=== Rugby ===
Apart from church use, probably its best known use is as the 'Welsh Rugby Hymn', often sung by the crowd at rugby matches, especially those of the Wales national rugby union team. There it is common for many voices to repeat of the last three syllables of the penultimate line of each verse ("want no more", "strength and shield" and "give to thee") to a rising arpeggio, which in church use is only sung in the alto and bass parts if at all.

=== Football ===
From the second half of the 20th century, English and Scottish football fans used often to sing a song based on this tune using the words "We'll support you evermore", which in turn led to many different versions being adapted. As of 2016, the variation "You're Not Singing Any More" when taunting the fans of opposing teams who are losing remains extremely popular.
