= Sweet Illusions =

Studio album by Peter Capaldi
- Released: 28 March 2025
- Recorded: 2023–2024
- Genre: Rock
- Length: 45:29
- Label: Last Night from Glasgow
- Producer: Dr. Robert

Peter Capaldi chronology
St. Christopher (2021)	Sweet Illusions (2025)

Singles from Sweet Illusions
- 1. "Bin Night" Released: September 2024; 2. "Is It Today" Released: November 2024; 3. "Sweet Illusions" Released: January 2025

Sweet Illusions is the second studio album by Scottish actor, singer, and guitarist Peter Capaldi, released on 28 March 2025 on the independent label Last Night from Glasgow and was produced by Dr. Robert. Three singles, "Bin Night", "Is It Today", and "Sweet Illusions" preceded its release, upon which it was met with positive reviews from critics. It peaked on the Scottish Albums Chart at no. 3.

== Background ==
Recorded from 2023 to 2024, Sweet Illusions, like his debut album St. Christopher (2021), was produced by Dr. Robert of the Blow Monkeys, who, like Capaldi, is from Glasgow, Scotland. Both albums were released roughly forty years after Capaldi quit music in favour of an acting career. In an interview with the NME, he referred to Sweet Illusions as having "quite a nostalgic feeling about it ... It's a bit art studenty, Glasgow, 1978".

== Composition ==
Sweet Illusions has been broadly categorised as rock music, often featuring echoed effects. The record opens with "Is It Today", a song largely rooted in 1980s rock, followed by the ballad "Hanger Lane". A review for Mojo noted similarities to new wave music, as well as groups like the Stranglers with the keyboards on the title track and the Alarm with guitars on "The Big Guy"; on the latter, Capaldi delivers vocals that border on spoken word. The album continues with another ballad, "Bin Night". Capaldi referred to the song as a lullaby, describing how a mundane activity such as taking out the rubbish provided him a sense of control upon becoming a grandfather.

Capaldi has cited bands from 1980s Glasgow and Frank Sinatra as influences on the album. Following its release, he revealed some of his favourite albums in an issue of Uncut, singling out Simple Minds' debut Life in a Day (1979) and Sinatra's That's Life (1966).

== Singles and release ==
The album's lead single, "Bin Night", was released in September 2024, followed by "Is It Today" in November and "Sweet Illusions" in January 2025. Sweet Illusions was released on 28 March 2025 on the Scottish independent label Last Night from Glasgow. It peaked at no. 3 on the Scottish Album Charts, and although the album did not place on the main UK albums chart, it did peak at no. 4 on the Independent Albums Chart.

== Critical reception ==
Professional ratings
Review scores
Source	Rating
Mojo	3/5 stars
Record Collector	3/5 stars

In a three-star review for Mojo, John Aizlewood said the album "is more than another lovey dalliance" from the actor, and they highlighted "Bin Night" for showcasing Capaldi's ability to "tame a big gravelly ballad" with an amount of "grit". In a separate three-star review, Steve Pollock of Record Collector thought that "Capaldi's charismatic vocal [delivery]" is the overall highlight of the record, invoking a nostalgic quality reminiscent of singers like Tom Waits, Leonard Cohen, and Jim Kerr.

== Track listing ==
All tracks are written by Peter Capaldi.

Sweet Illusions track listing
No.	Title	Length
1.	"Is It Today"	3:32
2.	"Hanger Lane"	3:34
3.	"Not Going Anywhere"	3:22
4.	"Sweet Illusions"	3:47
5.	"The Big Guy"	5:22
6.	"Bin Night"	4:34
7.	"The Best of Me"	3:33
8.	"Something to Behold"	3:39
9.	"Through the Cracks"	6:04
10.	"Diminished"	3:14
11.	"No One in the World"	4:48
Total length:		45:29

== Personnel ==
Credits adapted from the vinyl liner notes.

=== Musicians ===
- Peter Capaldi – vocals, acoustic and electric guitars, synths, musical typing
- Dr. Robert – acoustic and electric guitars, bass, keyboards, backing vocals
- Jos Hawken – piano, keyboards
- Steve Sidelnyk – drums, drum programming, percussion

=== Technical and design ===
- Dr. Robert – production
- Katie Chapman – production assistance
- Iván Moreno – engineering, mixing
- Paul McGeechan – mastering
- Colin Cassells – graphics

== Charts ==
Chart performance for Sweet Illusions
Chart (2025)	Peak position
Scottish Albums (OCC)	3
UK Independent Albums (OCC)	4
