= List of top 10 singles in 2025 (Ireland) =

This is a list of singles that have peaked in the top 10 of the Irish Singles Chart in 2025, as compiled by the Official Charts Company on behalf of the Irish Recorded Music Association.

== Top 10 singles ==
Artist(s)	Single	Peak	Peak date	Weeks at #1	Ref.
Rosé and Bruno Mars	"APT."	3	3 January	-	
Zach Bryan	"Pink Skies"	7	10 January	-	
Hozier	"Do I Wanna Know?"	9	24 January	-	
Chrystal	"The Days (Notion remix)"	4	31 January	-	
Lola Young	"Messy"	1	31 January	4	
Lady Gaga	"Abracadabra"	6	14 February	-	
Kendrick Lamar	"Not Like Us"	1	21 February	1	
Kendrick Lamar and SZA	"All the Stars"	6	21 February	-	
Chappell Roan	"Pink Pony Club"	2	7 March	-	
Sabrina Carpenter	"Busy Woman"	5	14 March	-	
Doechii	"Anxiety"	4	14 March	-	
Chappell Roan	"The Giver"	5	21 March	-	
Alex Warren	"Ordinary"	1	21 March	6	
Alex Warren	"Carry You Home"	7	28 March	-	
Tate McRae	"Sports Car"	4	11 April	-	
Lorde	"What Was That"	6	2 May	-	
Ravyn Lenae	"Love Me Not"	3	2 May	-	
Kingfishr	"Killeagh"	1	2 May	17	
WizTheMc and Bees & Honey	"Show Me Love"	6	16 May	-	
Sombr	"Undressed"	1	16 May	4	
Tate McRae	"Revolving Door"	9	23 May	-	
Amble	"Schoolyard Days"	9	30 May	-	
Alex Warren featuring Jelly Roll	"Bloodline"	6	30 May	-	
Calvin Harris featuring Clementine Douglas	"Blessings"	5	6 June	-	
Sombr	"Back to Friends"	4	6 June	-	
Tate McRae	"Just Keep Watching"	2	6 June	-	
Benson Boone	"Mystical Magical"	9	13 June	-	
Sabrina Carpenter	"Manchild"	1	13 June	5	
Charli XCX	"Party 4 U"	8	20 June	-	
Zach Bryan	"Oklahoma Smoke Show"	4	27 June	-	
Zach Bryan	"Revival"	2	27 June	-	
Zach Bryan	"Nine Ball"	1	27 June	1	
Lewis Capaldi	"Survive"	4	4 July	-	
MK and Chrystal	"Dior"	2	4 July	-	
Disco Lines and Tinashe	"No Broke Boys"	2	18 July	-	
Alex Warren	"Eternity"	7	25 July	-	
Kingfishr	"Diamonds & Roses"	3	25 July	-	
Justin Bieber	"Daisies"	2	25 July	-	
CMAT	"Euro-Country"	9	1 August	-	
Chappell Roan	"The Subway"	2	8 August	-	
Oasis	"Wonderwall"	8	22 August	-	
Oasis	"Don't Look Back in Anger"	5	22 August	-	
Oasis	"Live Forever"	3	22 August	-	
Sam Fender and Olivia Dean	"Rein Me In"	8	29 August	-	
Huntrix	"Golden"	2	29 August	-	
Sabrina Carpenter	"My Man on Willpower"	9	5 September	-	
Sabrina Carpenter	"Tears"	3	5 September	-	
Sabrina Carpenter	"Nobody's Son"	8	12 September	-	
Sombr	"12 to 12"	4	19 September	-	
Olivia Dean	"Man I Need"	1	19 September	3	
Sabrina Carpenter	"When Did You Get Hot?"	8	26 September	-	
Amble	"Lonely Island"	9	3 October	-	
Tate McRae	"Tit for Tat"	7	3 October	-	
Taylor Swift	"Elizabeth Taylor"	3	10 October	-	
Taylor Swift	"Opalite"	2	10 October	-	
Taylor Swift	"The Fate of Ophelia"	1	10 October	9	
Dave and Tems	"Raindance"	9	31 October	-	
Lily Allen	"Pussy Palace"	9	7 November	-	
Fred Again, Sammy Virji and Reggie	"Talk of the Town"	4	14 November	-	
Olivia Dean	"Nice to Each Other"	4	28 November	-	
Olivia Dean	"So Easy (To Fall in Love)"	3	28 November	-	
Raye	"Where Is My Husband!"	2	28 November	-	

== Entries by artist ==
The following table shows artists who achieved two or more top 10 entries in 2025. The figures include both main artists and featured artists and the peak position in brackets.

Entries	Artist	Songs
6	Sabrina Carpenter	"Busy Woman" (5), "Manchild" (1), "My Man on Willpower" (9), "Tears" (3), "Nobody's Son" (8), "When Did You Get Hot?" (8)
4	Alex Warren	"Ordinary" (1), "Carry You Home" (7), "Bloodline" (6), "Eternity" (7)
4	Olivia Dean	"Rein Me In" (8), "Man I Need" (1), "Nice to Each Other" (4), "So Easy (To Fall in Love)" (3)
4	Tate McRae	"Sports Car" (4), "Revolving Door" (9), "Just Keep Watching" (2), "Tit for Tat" (7)
4	Zach Bryan	"Pink Skies" (7), "Oklahoma Smoke Show" (4), "Revival" (2), "Nine Ball" (1)
3	Chappell Roan	"Pink Pony Club" (2), "The Giver" (5), "The Subway" (2)
3	Oasis	"Wonderwall" (8), "Don't Look Back in Anger" (5), "Live Forever" (3)
3	Sombr	"Undressed" (1), "Back to Friends" (4), "12 to 12" (4)
3	Taylor Swift	"Elizabeth Taylor" (3), "Opalite" (2), "The Fate of Ophelia" (1)
2	Amble	"Schoolyard Days" (9), "Lonely Island" (9)
2	Chrystal	"The Days" (4), "Dior" (2)
2	Kendrick Lamar	"Not Like Us" (1), "All the Stars" (6)
2	Kingfishr	"Killeagh" (1), "Diamonds & Roses" (3)

== See also ==
- 2025 in music
- List of number-one singles of 2025 (Ireland)
