= List of UK top-ten singles in 2025 =

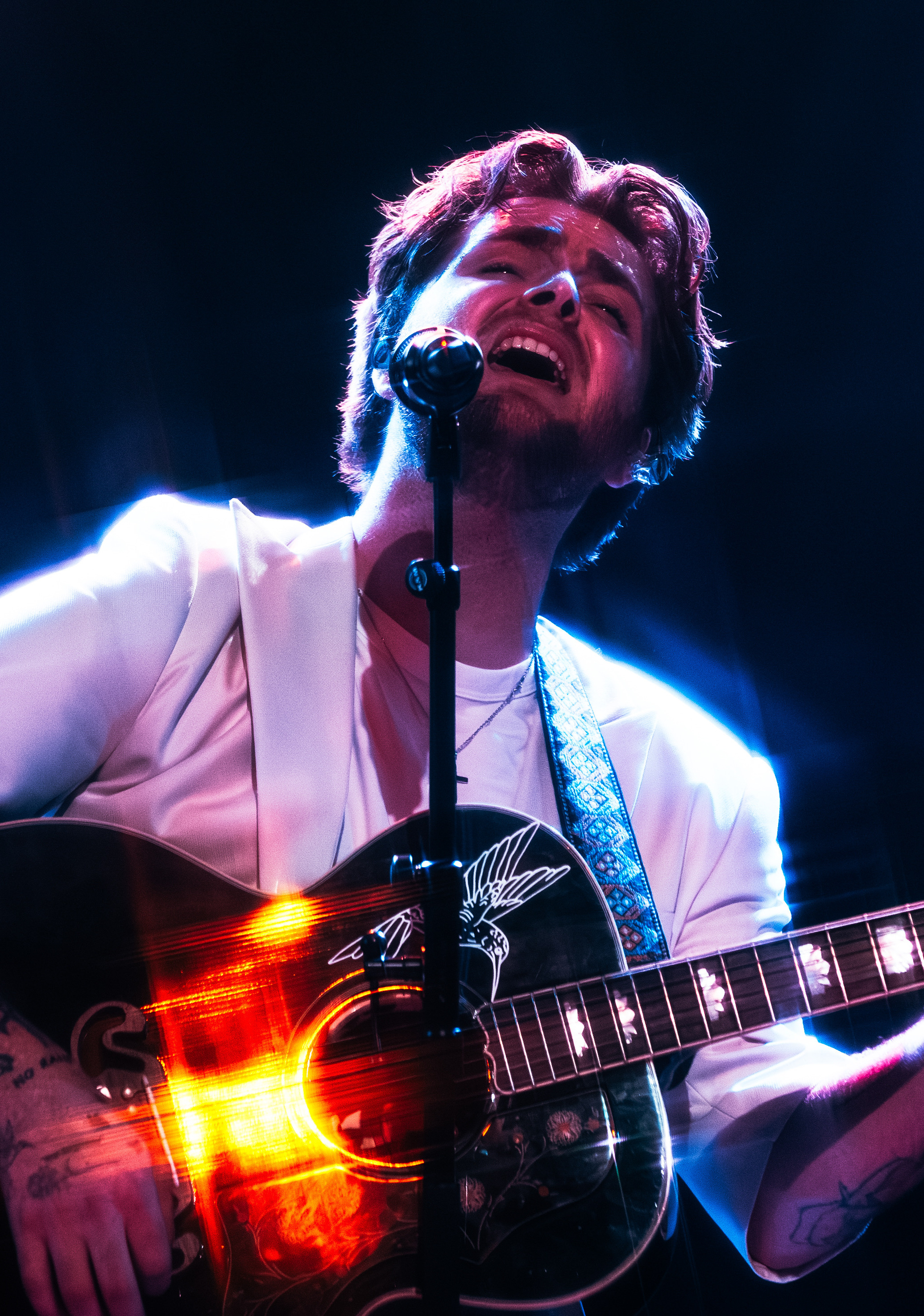
Alex Warren became a prominent breakout star in 2025, securing four top-ten singles, including the year's best-selling single, "Ordinary", which spent thirteen non-consecutive weeks at number-one.

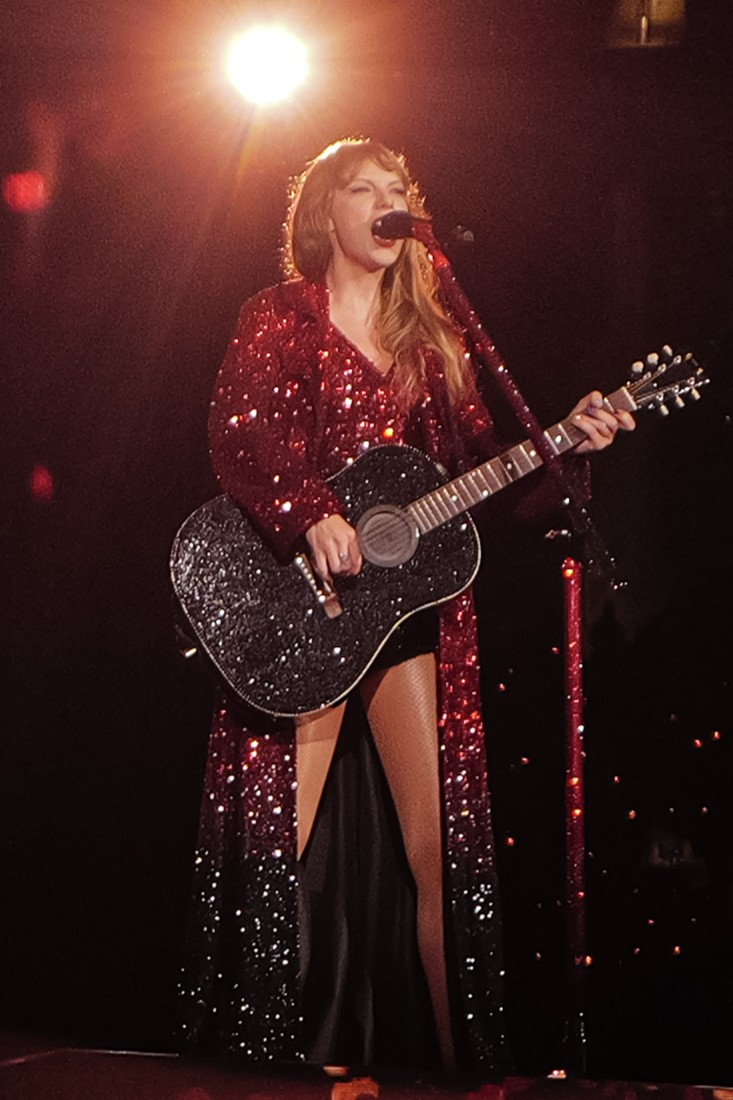
Taylor Swift reached new career highs in October this year when she achieved the prestigious Chart Double for the fourth time. She achieved her fifth UK number-one single with "The Fate of Ophelia", which earned the highest first-week opening of the year, attaining 132,000 units, and spent seven non-consecutive weeks at the top spot. Swift also earned the highest first-week sales for an album by an international arist this century with The Life of a Showgirl, which opened with 423,000 units. Swift had two further top-ten entries this year, including "Opalite", which rose to number-one in February 2026.

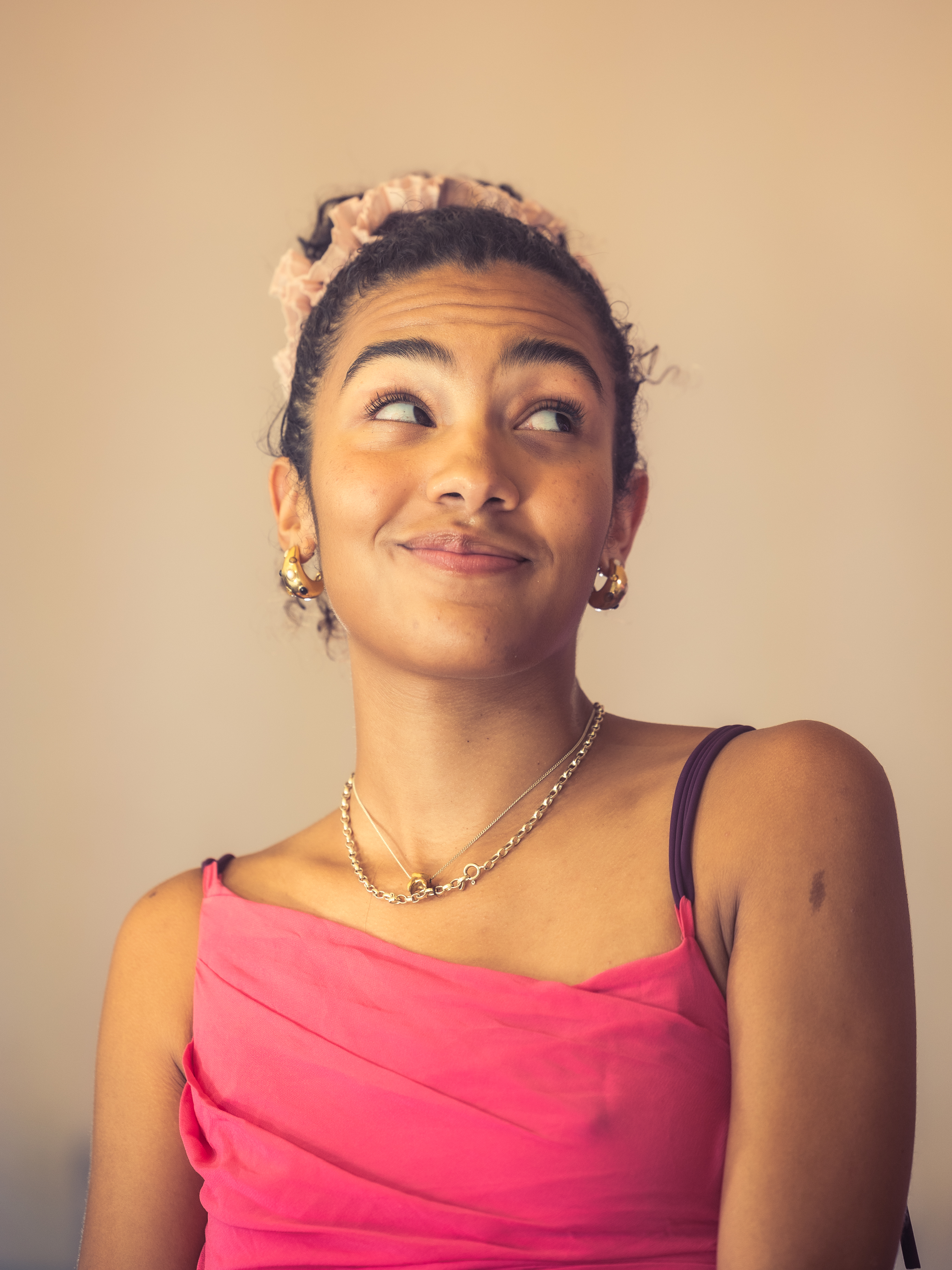
Olivia Dean was a newcomer to the UK top-ten in 2025, earning four entries, including "Man I Need", which climbed to number-one in October, the same week her album The Art of Loving debuted at number-one in the UK Albums Chart, making her the first British solo female artist to claim the Chart Double since Adele in 2021. Her duet with Sam Fender, "Rein Me In", later topped the chart for a record 23 non-consecutive weeks in 2026, becoming the longest-running UK number-one single of all time.

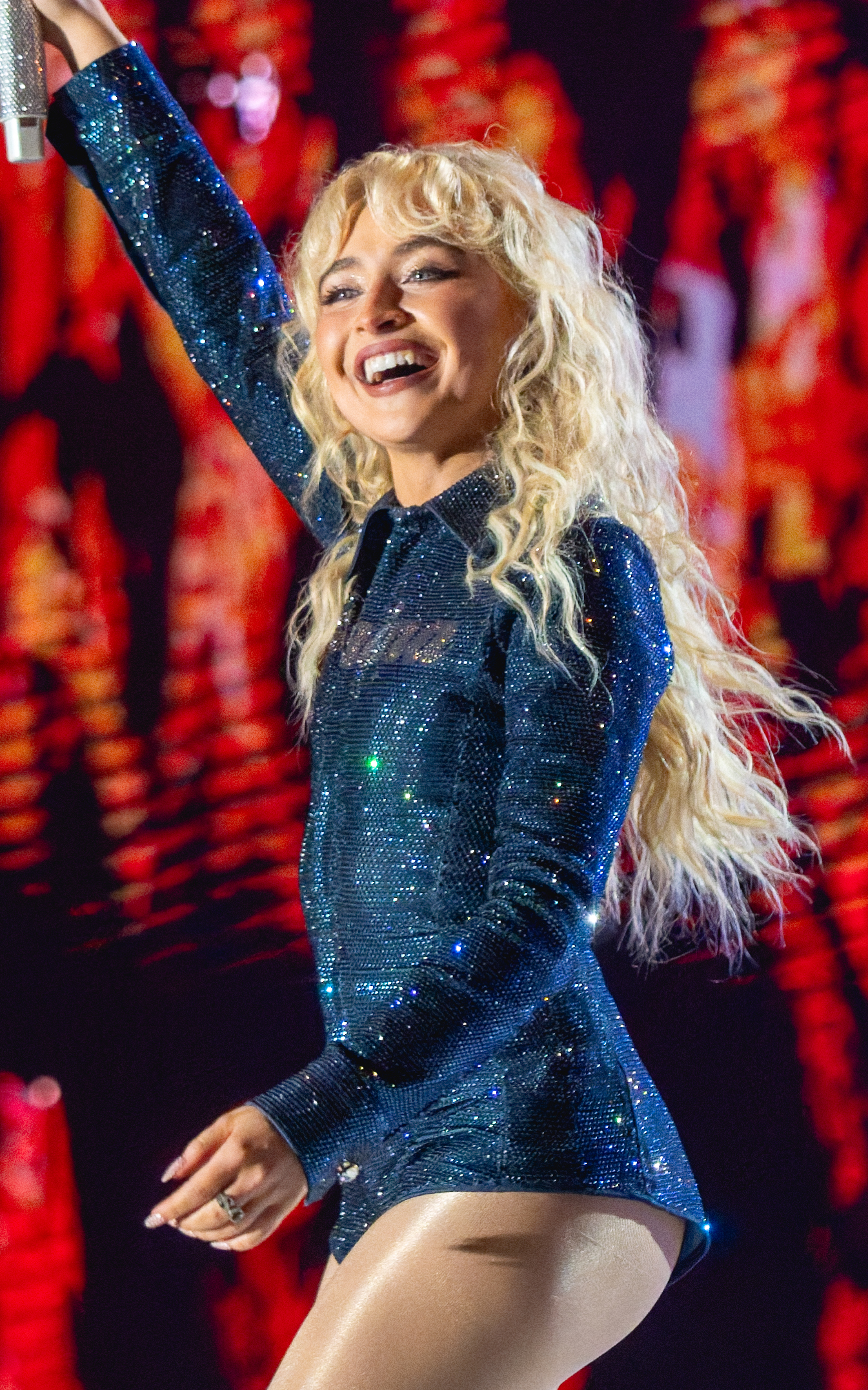
Sabrina Carpenter remained a dominant force in the UK charts this year, securing seven top-ten singles, including "Manchild", which debuted at number-one in June.

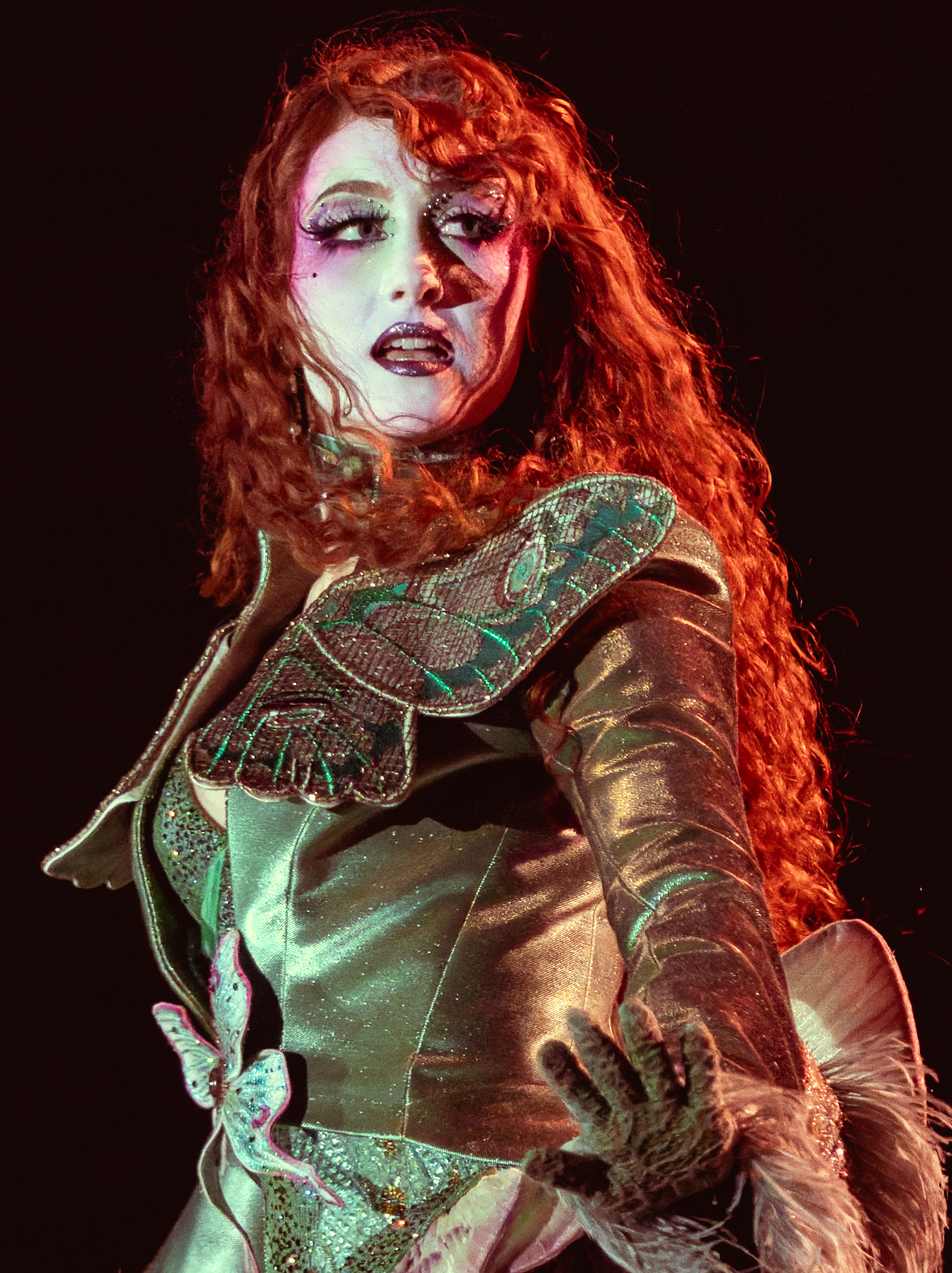
2025 was also a successful year for Chappell Roan, who achieved three top-ten singles, including the number-one hits "Pink Pony Club" (a song first released in 2020) and "The Subway".

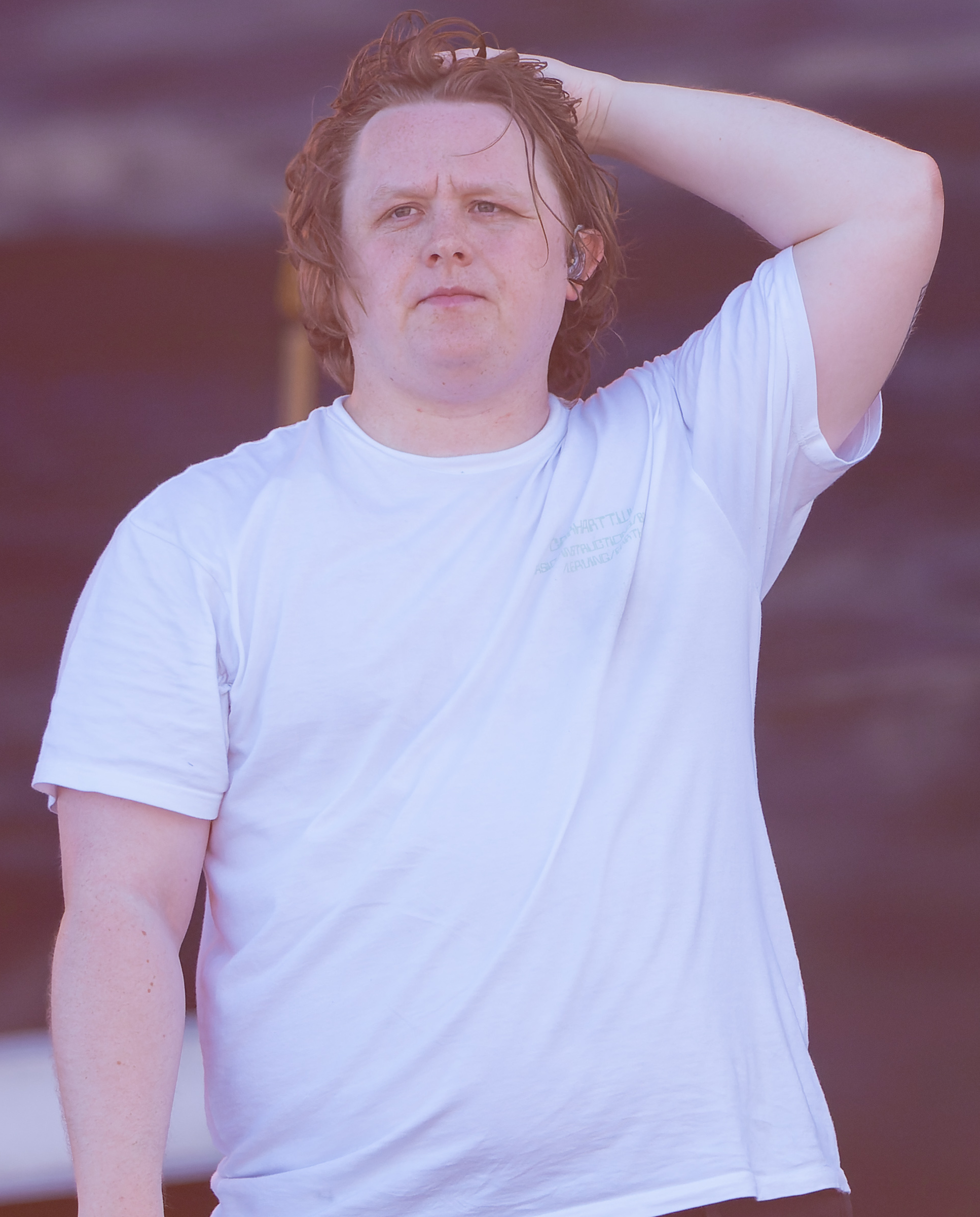
Lewis Capaldi earned two top-ten singles this year, including the number-one hit "Survive", which debuted at the top of the chart with 68,500 units, earning Capaldi the biggest opening week of his career.

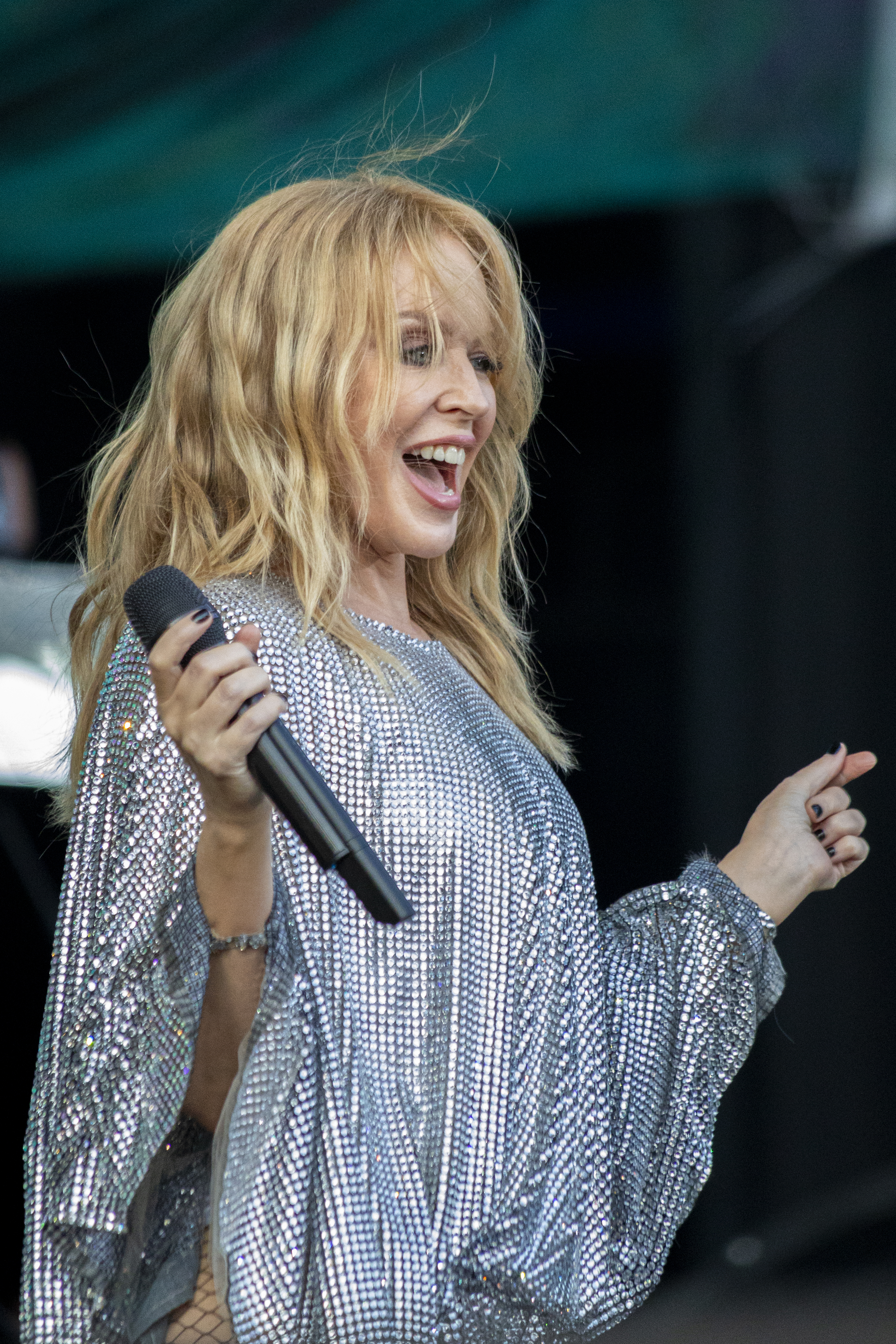
In December 2025, Kylie Minogue secured her eighth UK number-one single, and her first in 22 years, with the Amazon Music exclusive "XMAS", which also became the year's Christmas number-one single.

The UK Singles Chart is one of many music charts compiled by the Official Charts Company that calculates the best-selling singles of the week in the United Kingdom. Since 2004 the chart has been based on the sales of both physical singles and digital downloads, with airplay figures excluded from the official chart. Since 2014, the singles chart has been based on both sales and streaming, with the ratio altered in 2017 to 150:1 streams and only three singles by the same artist eligible for the chart. From July 2018, video streams from YouTube Music and Spotify among others began to be counted for the Official Charts. This list shows singles that peaked in the Top 10 of the UK Singles Chart during 2025, as well as singles which peaked in 2024 and 2026 but were in the top 10 in 2025. The entry date is when the song appeared in the top 10 for the first time (week ending, as published by the Official Charts Company, which is six days after the chart is announced).

Ninety-three singles were in the top ten this year. Twenty-five singles from 2024 remained in the top 10 for several weeks at the beginning of the year, while "Step into Christmas" by Elton John", "Rein Me In" by Sam Fender and Olivia Dean, "Where Is My Husband!" by Raye, "So Easy (To Fall in Love)" by Olivia Dean, "Opalite" by Taylor Swift and "Raindance" by Dave featuring Tems were all released in 2025 but did not reach their peak until 2026. "Rockin' Around the Christmas Tree" by Brenda Lee and "Fairytale of New York" by The Pogues featuring Kirsty MacColl charted in 2024 and re-entered the top 10 in 2025, but did not reach their peaks until 2026. "Not Like Us" by Kendrick Lamar, "Luther" by Kendrick Lamar and SZA, "All I Want for Christmas Is You" by Mariah Carey, "Jingle Bell Rock" by Bobby Helms, "It Can't Be Christmas" by Tom Grennan, "Santa Tell Me" by Ariana Grande, "Underneath the Tree" by Kelly Clarkson and "Messy" by Lola Young were the songs from 2024 to reach their peak in 2025. Chrystal, Alex Warren, Doechii, Ravyn Lenae, Sombr and Olivia Dean were among the many artists who achieved their first top 10 single in 2025.

The 2024 Christmas number-one, "Last Christmas" by Wham!, originally released in 1984, remained at number-one for the first week of 2025. The song later returned to number-one in December 2025, but was denied the Christmas number-one spot this time around by Kylie Minogue's "XMAS". In the second week of 2025, Gracie Abrams' "That's So True", which had spent five weeks at number-one in 2024, returned to the top spot for a further three weeks. The first new number-one single of the year was "Messy" by Lola Young. Overall, thirteen different songs peaked at number-one in 2025, with Chappell Roan (2) having the most songs hit that position.

An asterisk (*) in the "Weeks in Top 10" column shows that the song is currently in the top 10.

== Background ==
=== Multiple entries ===
Ninety-three singles charted in the top 10 in 2025 with seventy singles reaching their peak this year (including the re-entries "All I Want for Christmas Is You", "Jingle Bell Rock", "Santa Tell Me" and "Underneath the Tree", which charted in previous years but reached peaks on their latest chart run).

=== Kendrick Lamar secures first UK number-one single following Super Bowl LIX performance ===
On 14 February 2025 (20 February 2025, week ending), Kendrick Lamar re-entered the top-ten of the UK Singles Chart simultaneously with "Not Like Us" and "Luther" (a duet with SZA) following his performance at the Super Bowl LIX halftime show. The following week, Lamar secured his first UK number-one single when "Not Like Us" topped the charts, nine months after the song's original release, whilst his 2018 hit "All the Stars" (also a duet with SZA), re-entered the top-ten at its original peak of number 5.

=== Jack Black makes history with "Steve's Lava Chicken" ===
On 2 May 2025 (8 May 2025, week ending), Jack Black's "Steve's Lava Chicken" from the soundtrack of A Minecraft Movie, running at just 34 seconds long, made history as the shortest song in duration to enter the top-ten of the UK Singles Chart after it climbed to number nine.

=== Alex Warren's "Ordinary" becomes longest-running UK number-one by US male solo artist ===
On 6 June 2025 (12 June 2025, week ending), Alex Warren's "Ordinary" spent a twelfth consecutive week at number-one in the UK Singles Chart, becoming the longest-running UK number-one single ever by a US male solo artist, surpassing the eleven-week run at number-one in 1955 by Slim Whitman's "Rose Marie", and the longest running number-one single since ACR was introduced in 2017. After being knocked off the top spot the following week by Sabrina Carpenter's "Manchild", "Ordinary" returned to number-one for a thirteenth non-consecutive week on 20 June 2025 (26 June 2025, week ending).

=== Sabrina Carpenter's chart dominance continues as she secures fourth UK number-one single ===
On 13 June 2025 (19 June 2025, week ending), Sabrina Carpenter secured her fourth number-one single with "Manchild", following her hat-trick of number one singles in 2024. The song topped the UK Singles Chart for two non-consecutive weeks and opened at the top spot with 62,400 units, the biggest opening week for a female artist in 2025 so far. In September 2025, Carpenter went on to secure the biggest opening week of 2025 for an international artist with the song's parent album Man's Best Friend, opening with 85,500 chart units. This surpassed Lady Gaga with Mayhem, which opened with 55,500 chart units in March 2025. Carpenter was later surpassed by Taylor Swift in October 2025 with The Life of a Showgirl, which opened with 423,000 units.

=== Lewis Capaldi earns biggest opening week of his career ===
On 4 July 2025 (10 July 2025, week ending), Lewis Capaldi earned his sixth UK number-one single with "Survive", which debuted at the top of the UK Singles Chart in the wake of his performance at the Glastonbury Festival 2025, which marked his first live appearance since 2023. The song opened with 68,500 units, earning Capaldi the biggest opening week of his career, as well as becoming the largest opening week of 2025 so far, surpassing "Manchild" by Sabrina Carpenter. In October 2025, Capaldi was later surpassed by Taylor Swift's "The Fate of Ophelia" which opened with 132,000 units.

=== MK achieves his first UK number-one single thirty years after chart debut ===
On 11 July 2025 (17 July 2025, week ending), MK achieved his first UK number-one single with "Dior", thirty years after making his chart debut with "Always", which peaked at number 69 in August 1995. MK has become an artist with one of the longest gaps between their debut chart entry and chart-topper. The song also went on to become Chrystal's first UK number-one single, and her second top-ten hit of the year, after "The Days".

=== Justin Bieber secures his first UK number-one single in six years ===
On 18 July 2025 (24 July 2025, week ending), Justin Bieber secured his 28th UK top-ten single with "Daisies", which debuted at number four. The song reached number-one a week later on 25 July 2025 (31 July 2025, week ending), becoming Bieber's eighth UK number-one single, making it on the par with Sam Smith, the Rolling Stones and Oasis, and his first since "I Don't Care" (a duet with Ed Sheeran) topped the charts in May 2019.

=== KPop Demon Hunters dominates UK charts and sets records ===
During 2025, four songs from the soundtrack of the Netflix animated film KPop Demon Hunters entered the top-ten of the UK Singles Chart. Two of these, "Golden" (1) and "How It's Done" (9), were recorded by Huntrix, a fictional K-pop girl group consisting of members Rumi, Mira, and Zoey (whose singing voices are performed by Ejae, Audrey Nuna, and Rei Ami, respectively), whilst the other two, "Your Idol" (5) and "Soda Pop" (3), were recorded by Saja Boys, a fictional K-pop boy group consisting of members Jinu, Abs, Baby, Mystery and Romance (whose singing voices are performed by Andrew Choi, Neckwav, Danny Chung, Kevin Woo and Samuil Lee, respectively).

On 1 August 2025 (7 August 2025, week ending), "Golden" reached number-one in the UK Singles Chart, becoming only the second-ever K-pop song to achieve that feat after "Gangnam Style" by Psy in 2012. After being knocked off the top spot the following week by Chappell Roan's "The Subway", "Golden" returned to number-one on 15 August 2025 (21 August 2025, week ending), and went on to spend a total of ten non-consecutive weeks at the top spot.

On 8 August 2025 (14 August 2025, week ending), "Golden", "Soda Pop" and "Your Idol" were placed at numbers two, six and eight, respectively, in the UK Singles Chart, marking the first time that three K-pop songs charted in the top 10 of the UK chart simultaneously. On 19 September 2025 (25 September 2025, week ending), whilst "Golden" was spending its seventh non-consecutive week at number-one, "Soda Pop" and "Your Idol" were also placed in the top 5 at numbers three and five, respectively, which marked the first time that three K-pop songs charted in the top 5 of the UK chart simultaneously.

=== Olivia Dean secures Chart Double ===
On 3 October 2025 (9 October 2025, week ending), Olivia Dean secured the coveted Chart Double after her single "Man I Need" climbed to number-one in the UK Singles Chart, whilst her album The Art of Loving debuted at number-one in the UK Albums Chart. In doing so, Dean became the first British solo female artist to claim the Chart Double since Adele achieved it in 2021 with "Easy on Me" and the album 30.

=== Taylor Swift's chart records reach new peaks ===
On 10 October 2025 (16 October 2025, week ending), Taylor Swift earned her fourth prestigious Chart Double after her single "The Fate of Ophelia" debuted at number-one in the UK Singles Chart, whilst the parent album The Life of a Showgirl debuted at number-one album in the UK Albums Chart. "The Fate of Ophelia" became Swift's fifth UK number-one single, as well as her fourth in the 2020s. Swift also attained the largest opening week for a single in 2025 so far, surpassing "Survive" by Lewis Capaldi, with 132,000 units, becoming the largest first week sales for a single since December 2021. Additionally, Swift earned the highest first-week sales for an album in the 2020s with the parent album selling 423,000 units in its first week, which also became the highest first-week sales for an international artist in the 21st century.

=== Lily Allen earns first top-ten single in eleven years ===
On 7 November 2025 (13 November 2025, week ending), Lily Allen returned to the top-ten of the UK Singles Chart with "Pussy Palace", which peaked at number 8. The song became Allen's first single to enter the UK top-ten since "Air Balloon" peaked at number 7 in March 2014.

=== Michael Jackson's "Thriller" reaches UK new chart peak amid Halloween surge ===
On 7 November 2025 (13 November 2025, week ending), Michael Jackson re-entered the top-ten of the UK Singles Chart with "Thriller" at number 9, surpassing the original peak at number 10 upon release in November 1983. The song re-entered the chart after becoming a popular Halloween standard.

=== "Last Christmas" returns to number-one, but is later denied Christmas number-one spot for the 3rd consecutive year by Kylie Minogue's XMAS ===
On 12 December 2025 (18 December 2025, week ending), Wham!'s "Last Christmas" returned to number-one in the UK Singles Chart, notching an eleventh non-consecutive week at the top spot. This marked the fifth occasion the song reached number-one, having previously done so in January 2021, December 2022, December 2023 and December 2024. The song had also claimed the coveted Christmas number-one spot for two years in a row, in 2023 and 2024. However, its chances of becoming the Christmas number-one single for the third successive year were dashed on 19 December 2025 (25 December 2025, week ending), as it descended to number two in the chart, whilst Kylie Minogue's "XMAS" ascended to number-one and became 2025's Christmas number-one single. "Last Christmas" eventually claimed a twelfth non-consecutive week at number-one on 26 December 2025 (1 January 2026, week ending).

=== Kylie Minogue secures the Christmas number-one with XMAS and sets records ===
On 19 December 2025 (25 December 2025, week ending), Kylie Minogue secured her eighth UK number-one single with "XMAS", released exclusively on Amazon Music, which became the Christmas number-one single of 2025. The song became Minogue's first chart-topper since "Slow" topped the charts 22 years previously in November 2003, and Minogue was also the first female solo artist to earn a Christmas number-one since Sam Bailey reached number-one in December 2013 with "Skyscraper". Minogue also set records by becoming the first female artist in UK Chart history to earn a number-one single across four decades, the 1980s, 1990s, 2000s and 2020s, as well as the oldest female solo artist to top the UK Singles Chart with new material.

=== Chart debuts ===
Twenty artists achieved their first charting top ten single in 2025, either as a lead or featured artist.

The following table (collapsed on desktop site) does not include acts who had previously charted as part of a group and secured their first top ten solo single.

Artist	Number of top 10s	First entry	Chart position	Other entries
Chrystal	2	"The Days"	4	"Dior" (1)
Alex Warren	4	"Ordinary"	1	"Carry You Home" (9), "Bloodline" (9), "Eternity" (3)
Doechii	2	"Denial is a River"	9	"Anxiety" (3)
WizTheMc	1	"Show Me Love"	3	—
Bees & Honey	1	"Show Me Love"	3	—
Sleep Token	1	"Caramel"	10	—
Ravyn Lenae	1	"Love Me Not"	2	—
Jack Black	1	"Steve's Lava Chicken"	9	—
Sombr	3	"Undressed"	4	"Back to Friends" (7), "12 to 12" (7)
Skye Newman	1	"Family Matters"	5	—
Jelly Roll	1	"Bloodline"	9	—
PlaqueBoyMax	1	"Victory Lap"	4	—
Olivia Dean	4	"Rein Me In"	1	"Nice to Each Other" (4), "Man I Need" (1), "So Easy (To Fall in Love)" (2)
Huntrix	2	"Golden"	1	"How It's Done" (9)
Disco Lines	1	"No Broke Boys"	2	—
Saja Boys	2	"Your Idol"	5	"Soda Pop" (3)
James Blake	1	"History"	9	—
Sienna Spiro	1	"Die on This Hill"	9	—
EsDeeKid	1	"Century"	10	—
Amena Youssef	1	"Lullaby"	5	—
Kieran Brunt	1	"Lullaby"	5	—
Lana Lubany	1	"Lullaby"	5	—
Nadine Shah	1	"Lullaby"	5	—
Nai Barghouti	1	"Lullaby"	5	—
Noam Bettan	1	"Lullaby"	5	—
Sura Abdo	1	"Lullaby"	5	—
Tyson	1	"Lullaby"	5	—
Yasmeen Ayyashi	1	"Lullaby"	5	—
Ysee	1	"Lullaby"	5	—

Notes

Brian Eno, Celeste, Leigh-Anne Pinnock, London Community Gospel Choir, Mabel and Neneh Cherry, who appear on "Lullaby" by Together for Palestine, had all previously reached the top-ten of the UK Singles Chart, either as solo artists, as part of a group, or as part of a charity collective. Brian Eno produced multiple hit singles by numerous artists over his career, and, as one half of the side project Passengers with The Edge from U2, secured a number 6 hit in 1995 with "Miss Sarajevo". Celeste was a featured performer on the 2020 charity single "Times Like These" by Live Lounge Allstars, which reached number-one. Leigh-Anne Pinnock enjoyed many top-ten singles as a member of Little Mix, including five number-ones. London Community Gospel Choir were featured performers on the 2017 charity record "Bridge Over Troubled Water" by Artists for Grenfell, which reached number-one. Mabel and Neneh Cherry both had multiple top-ten singles as solo artists.

=== Songs from films ===
Original songs from various films entered the top 10 throughout the year. These included "Defying Gravity" (from Wicked), "All the Stars" (from Black Panther), "Steve's Lava Chicken" (from A Minecraft Movie), "Just Keep Watching" (from F1) and "Golden", "Your Idol", "Soda Pop" and "How It's Done" (all from KPop Demon Hunters).

=== Best-selling singles ===
Alex Warren had the best-selling single of the year with "Ordinary". The song spent thirteen weeks at number-one, sold 1,800,000 copies and was certified 3× platinum by the BPI. "Messy" by Lola Young came in second place, while Chappell Roan's "Pink Pony Club", Huntrix's "Golden" and Bruno Mars and Rosé's "APT." made up the top five. Songs by Gracie Abrams, Benson Boone, Ravyn Lenae, Olivia Dean and Lady Gaga and Bruno Mars were also in the top ten best-selling singles of the year.

== Top-ten singles ==
Key

Symbol	Meaning
‡	Single peaked in 2024 but still in chart in 2025.
♦	Single released in 2025 but peaked in 2026.
(#)	Year-end top-ten single position and rank
Entered	The date that the single first appeared in the chart.
Peak	Highest position that the single reached in the UK Singles Chart.

Entered (week ending)	Weeks in top 10	Single	Artist	Peak	Peak reached (week ending)	Weeks at peak
Singles in 2024
15 February 2024	34	"Beautiful Things" ‡ (#7) ^{[HH]}^{[XX]}	Benson Boone	1	28 March 2024	2
16 May 2024	10	"Not Like Us" ^{[A]}^{[B]}^{[GG]}	Kendrick Lamar	1	27 February 2025	2
20 June 2024	17	"Please Please Please" ‡ ^{[C]}^{[KK]}	Sabrina Carpenter	1	27 June 2024	5
1 August 2024	3	"Who" ‡ ^{[AA]}^{[CC]}	Jimin	4	1 August 2024	1
29 August 2024	14	"Die with a Smile" ‡ (#10) ^{[W]}	Lady Gaga & Bruno Mars	2	24 October 2024	1
13 September 2024	9	"Somedays" ‡ ^{[X]}	Sonny Fodera, Jazzy & D.O.D.	5	24 October 2024	2
10 October 2024	2	"Timeless" ‡ ^{[FF]}	The Weeknd & Playboi Carti	7	10 October 2024	2
17 October 2024	15	"Sailor Song" ‡ ^{[T]}	Gigi Perez	1	7 November 2024	1
24 October 2024	6	"Bed Chem" ‡ ^{[D]}^{[BB]}	Sabrina Carpenter	6	21 November 2024	1
31 October 2024	16	"APT." ‡ (#5) ^{[R]}	Rosé & Bruno Mars	2	7 November 2024	7
7 November 2024	14	"That's So True" ‡ (#6) ^{[Q]}	Gracie Abrams	1	14 November 2024	8
14 November 2024	10	"The Door" ‡ ^{[Y]}	Teddy Swims	5	21 November 2024	2
21 November 2024	12	"Bad Dreams" ‡ ^{[Z]}^{[EE]}^{[OO]}^{[QQ]}^{[RR]}^{[SS]}	Teddy Swims	6	28 November 2024	1
5 December 2024	4	"Luther" ^{[II]}	Kendrick Lamar & SZA	4	27 February 2025	1
5 December 2024	4	"Defying Gravity" ‡ ^{[Y]}	Cynthia Erivo featuring Ariana Grande	7	5 December 2024	2
5 December 2024	10	"Last Christmas" ‡ ^{[E]}^{[HHH]}	Wham!	1	19 December 2024	5
5 December 2024	9	"All I Want for Christmas Is You" ^{[F]}^{[III]}	Mariah Carey	2	2 January 2025	2
12 December 2024	8	"Rockin' Around the Christmas Tree" ♦ ^{[H]}^{[JJJ]}	Brenda Lee	3	1 January 2026	1
12 December 2024	2	"Do They Know It's Christmas?" ‡ ^{[I]}^{[O]}	Band Aid	8	12 December 2024	1
12 December 2024	7	"Jingle Bell Rock" ^{[J]}^{[NNN]}	Bobby Helms	5	2 January 2025	1
19 December 2024	3	"It Can't Be Christmas"	Tom Grennan	3	2 January 2025	1
19 December 2024	6	"Fairytale of New York" ♦ ^{[K]}^{[MMM]}	The Pogues featuring Kirsty MacColl	5	1 January 2026	1
19 December 2024	4	"Santa Tell Me" ^{[L]}^{[LLL]}	Ariana Grande	8	2 January 2025	1
19 December 2024	6	"Underneath the Tree" ^{[M]}^{[N]}^{[KKK]}	Kelly Clarkson	5	18 December 2025	1
26 December 2024	11	"Messy" (#2) ^{[S]}	Lola Young	1	30 January 2025	4
Singles in 2025
2 January 2025	3	"Step into Christmas" ♦ ^{[P]}^{[PPP]}	Elton John	7	1 January 2026	1
9 January 2025	8	"The Days"	Chrystal	4	30 January 2025	3
23 January 2025	5	"Nice to Meet You" ^{[NN]}^{[TT]}	Myles Smith	6	23 January 2025	1
30 January 2025	2	"GBP"	Central Cee featuring 21 Savage	6	30 January 2025	1
6 February 2025	1	"CRG"	Central Cee featuring Dave	6	6 February 2025	1
6 February 2025	13	"Sports Car" ^{[LL]}	Tate McRae	3	6 March 2025	1
13 February 2025	8	"Abracadabra"	Lady Gaga	3	20 February 2025	2
13 February 2025	1	"Cry for Me"	The Weeknd	8	13 February 2025	1
20 February 2025	22	"Pink Pony Club" (#3)	Chappell Roan	1	13 March 2025	2
20 February 2025	26	"Ordinary" (#1) ^{[MM]}^{[WW]}	Alex Warren	1	27 March 2025	13
20 February 2025	1	"Denial Is a River"	Doechii	9	20 February 2025	1
27 February 2025	2	"All the Stars" ^{[JJ]}	Kendrick Lamar & SZA	5	27 February 2025	1
27 February 2025	9	"Busy Woman" ^{[PP]}	Sabrina Carpenter	6	27 March 2025	1
6 March 2025	2	"Revolving Door"	Tate McRae	9	13 March 2025	1
20 March 2025	9	"Anxiety"	Doechii	3	27 March 2025	3
27 March 2025	4	"The Giver"	Chappell Roan	2	27 March 2025	1
27 March 2025	1	"Evil J0rdan"	Playboi Carti	7	27 March 2025	1
27 March 2025	1	"Rather Lie"	Playboi Carti & The Weeknd	10	27 March 2025	1
3 April 2025	3	"Carry You Home"	Alex Warren	9	10 April 2025	1
10 April 2025	1	"Twilight Zone"	Ariana Grande	5	10 April 2025	1
10 April 2025	1	"Nokia"	Drake	10	10 April 2025	1
17 April 2025	10	"Azizam"	Ed Sheeran	3	17 April 2025	3
17 April 2025	8	"Show Me Love"	WizTheMc & Bees & Honey	3	8 May 2025	1
17 April 2025	1	"Caramel"	Sleep Token	10	17 April 2025	1
24 April 2025	13	"Love Me Not" (#8)	Ravyn Lenae	2	15 May 2025	4
8 May 2025	2	"Steve's Lava Chicken"	Jack Black	9	8 May 2025	1
15 May 2025	8	"Undressed"	Sombr	4	29 May 2025	3
22 May 2025	13	"Blessings"	Calvin Harris featuring Clementine Douglas	3	24 July 2025	1
29 May 2025	6	"Family Matters"	Skye Newman	5	12 June 2025	1
5 June 2025	2	"Bloodline"	Alex Warren & Jelly Roll	9	5 June 2025	1
12 June 2025	1	"Just Keep Watching"	Tate McRae	6	12 June 2025	1
12 June 2025	3	"Back to Friends"	Sombr	7	19 June 2025	1
19 June 2025	13	"Manchild" ^{[AAA]}	Sabrina Carpenter	1	19 June 2025	2
19 June 2025	9	"Sapphire" ^{[UU]}	Ed Sheeran	5	24 July 2025	1
26 June 2025	11	"Dior"	MK featuring Chrystal	1	17 July 2025	2
3 July 2025	5	"Victory Lap"	Fred Again, Skepta & PlaqueBoyMax	4	3 July 2025	1
3 July 2025	54*	"Rein Me In" ♦ ^{[VV]}^{[ZZ]}^{[BBB]}^{[DDD]}^{[FFF]}^{[UUU]}^{[FFFF]}^{[GGGG]}	Sam Fender & Olivia Dean	1	26 February 2026	23
10 July 2025	4	"Survive"	Lewis Capaldi	1	10 July 2025	1
24 July 2025	9	"Daisies" ^{[AAAA]}	Justin Bieber	1	31 July 2025	1
24 July 2025	22	"Golden" (#4) ^{[WWW]}	Huntrix	1	7 August 2025	10
24 July 2025	11	"Nice to Each Other" ^{[YY]}	Olivia Dean	4	9 October 2025	1
31 July 2025	1	"Eternity"	Alex Warren	3	31 July 2025	1
7 August 2025	1	"Which One"	Drake & Central Cee	4	7 August 2025	1
7 August 2025	7	"No Broke Boys"	Disco Lines & Tinashe	2	28 August 2025	1
7 August 2025	12	"Your Idol"	Saja Boys	5	25 September 2025	1
14 August 2025	5	"The Subway"	Chappell Roan	1	14 August 2025	1
14 August 2025	10	"Soda Pop"	Saja Boys	3	28 August 2025	2
28 August 2025	39*	"Man I Need" (#9) ^{[VVV]}^{[ZZZ]}^{[BBBB]}^{[CCCC]}^{[DDDD]}^{[HHHH]}	Olivia Dean	1	9 October 2025	1
11 September 2025	5	"Tears"	Sabrina Carpenter	3	11 September 2025	2
11 September 2025	1	"My Man on Willpower"	Sabrina Carpenter	7	11 September 2025	1
18 September 2025	2	"When Did You Get Hot?"	Sabrina Carpenter	9	18 September 2025	2
18 September 2025	6	"12 to 12"	Sombr	7	25 September 2025	3
2 October 2025	1	"Something in the Heavens"	Lewis Capaldi	3	2 October 2025	1
2 October 2025	19	"Where Is My Husband!" ♦ ^{[QQQ]}	Raye	1	8 January 2026	1
9 October 2025	1	"Tit for Tat"	Tate McRae	6	9 October 2025	1
9 October 2025	23	"So Easy (To Fall in Love)" ♦ ^{[CCC]}^{[TTT]}	Olivia Dean	2	26 February 2026	2
16 October 2025	15	"The Fate of Ophelia" ^{[RRR]}	Taylor Swift	1	16 October 2025	7
16 October 2025	11	"Opalite" ♦ ^{[YYY]}	Taylor Swift	1	19 February 2026	1
16 October 2025	7	"Elizabeth Taylor"	Taylor Swift	3	16 October 2025	1
30 October 2025	3	"How It's Done" ^{[GGG]}	Huntrix	9	30 October 2025	1
6 November 2025	13	"Raindance" ♦ ^{[OOO]}^{[SSS]}	Dave featuring Tems	1	29 January 2026	2
6 November 2025	1	"History"	Dave featuring James Blake	9	6 November 2025	1
13 November 2025	1	"Pussy Palace"	Lily Allen	8	13 November 2025	1
13 November 2025	1	"Thriller" ^{[EEE]}	Michael Jackson	9	13 November 2025	1
27 November 2025	5	"Die on This Hill" ^{[XXX]}^{[EEEE]}	Sienna Spiro	9	27 November 2025	2
4 December 2025	1	"Century"	EsDeeKid	10	4 December 2025	1
25 December 2025	2	"XMAS"	Kylie Minogue	1	25 December 2025	1
25 December 2025	1	"Lullaby"	Together for Palestine	5	25 December 2025	1

== Entries by artist ==
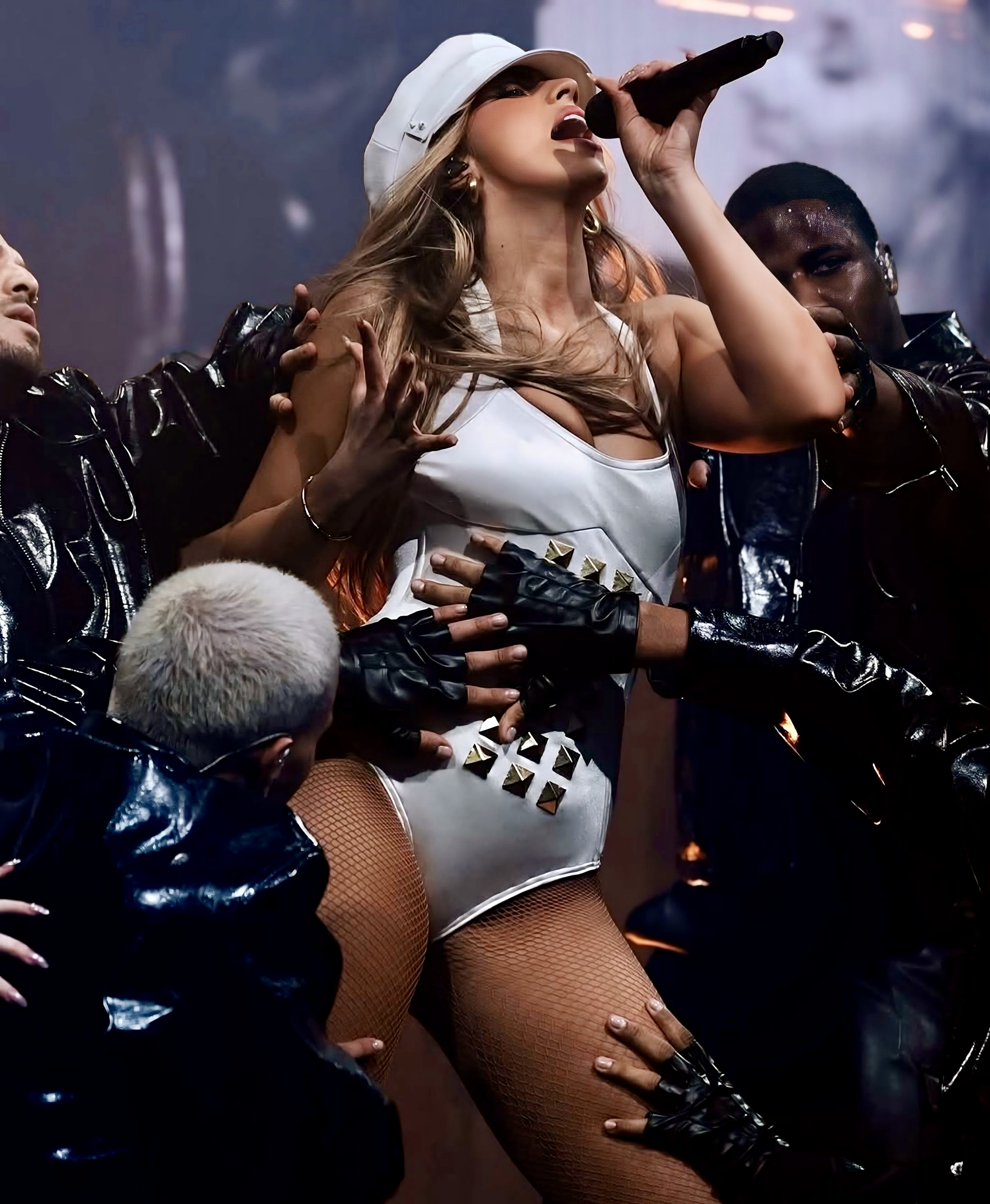
Tate McRae secured four top-ten singles in 2025, the highest-charting of which was "Sports Car", which reached number three.

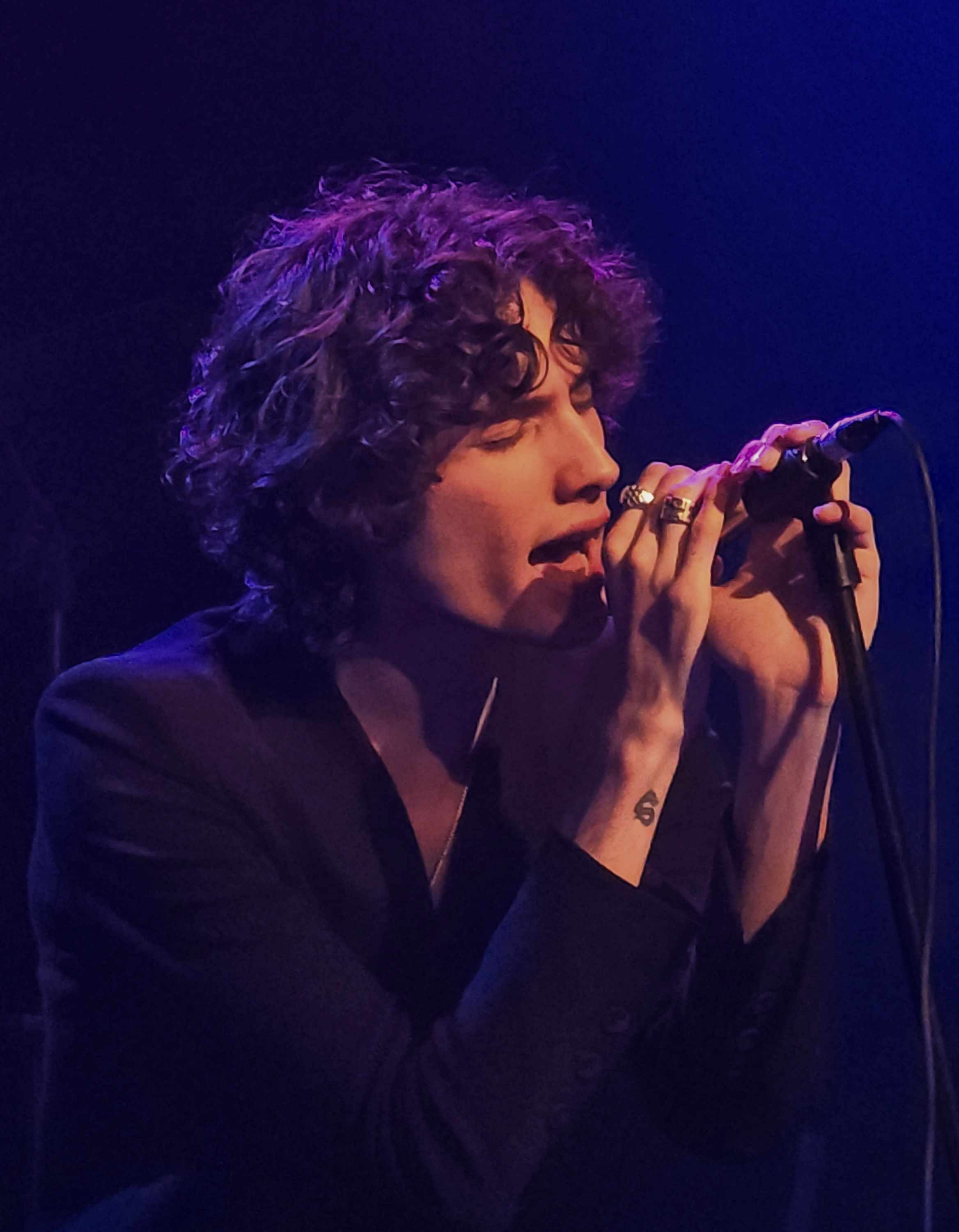
Sombr was another breakout artist this year, achieving three top-ten singles with "Undressed" (4), "Back to Friends" (7) and "12 to 12" (7).

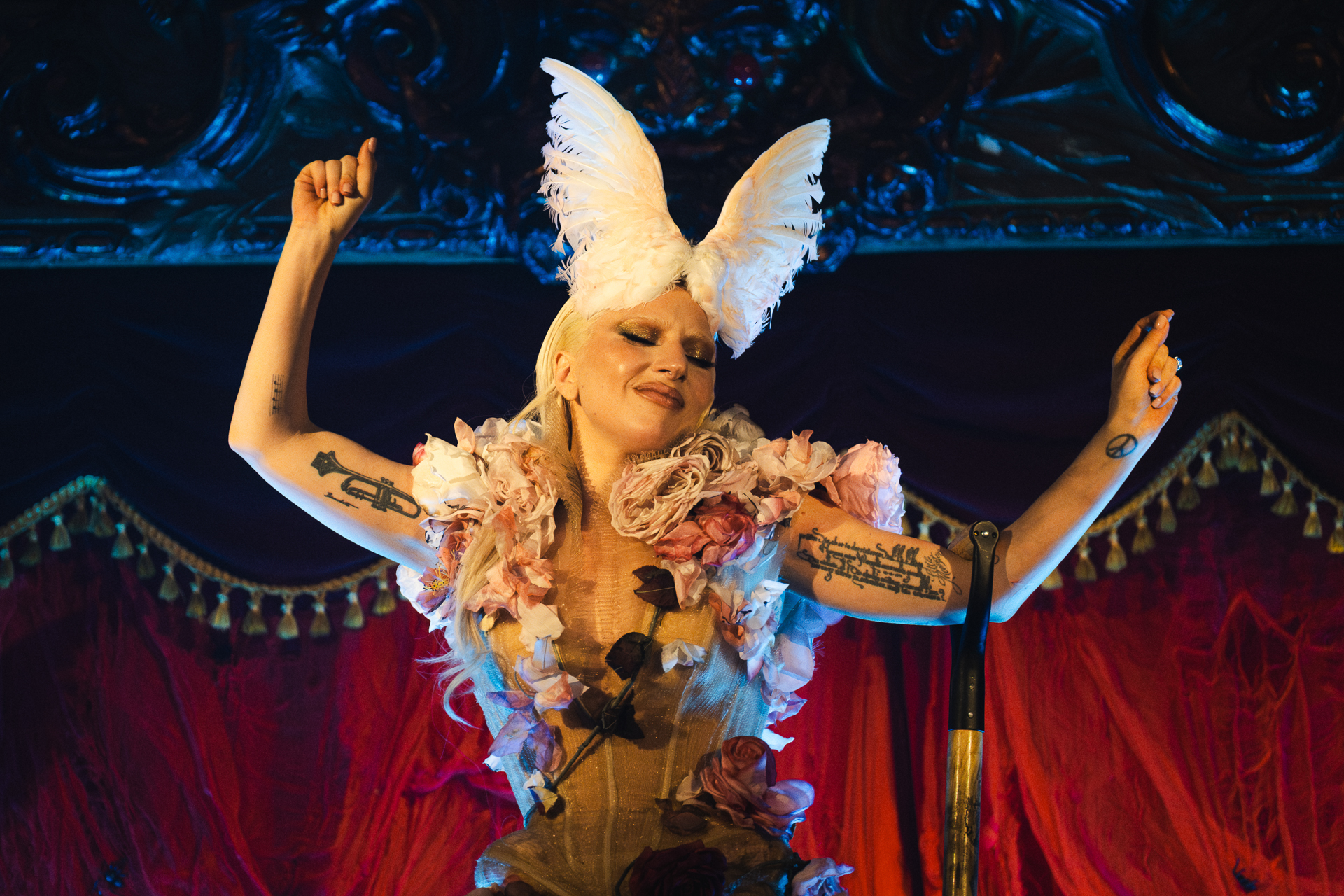
Lady Gaga also had a successful year on the charts, achieving two top-ten singles with "Die with a Smile" (which first charted in August 2024) and "Abracadabra".

The following table shows artists who achieved two or more top 10 entries in 2025, including singles that reached their peak in 2024. The figures include both main artists and featured artists, while appearances on ensemble charity records are also counted for each artist. The total number of weeks an artist spent in the top ten in 2025 is also shown.

Entries	Artist	Weeks	Singles
7	Sabrina Carpenter	24	"Please Please Please", "Bed Chem", "Busy Woman", "Manchild", "Tears", "My Man on Willpower", "When Did You Get Hot?"
4	Alex Warren	26	"Ordinary", "Carry You Home", "Bloodline", "Eternity"
4	Olivia Dean	20	"Rein Me In", "Nice to Each Other", "Man I Need", "So Easy (To Fall in Love)"
4	Tate McRae	15	"Sports Car", "Revolving Door", "Just Keep Watching", "Tit for Tat"
3	Chappell Roan	27	"Pink Pony Club", "The Giver", "The Subway"
3	Sombr	13	"Undressed", "Back to Friends", "12 to 12"
3	Taylor Swift	9	"The Fate of Ophelia", "Opalite", "Elizabeth Taylor"
3	Dave ^{[DD]}	7	"CRG", "Raindance", "History"
3	Ariana Grande ^{[Z]}	5	"Defying Gravity", "Santa Tell Me", "Twilight Zone"
3	Kendrick Lamar	5	"Not Like Us", "Luther", "All the Stars"
3	Central Cee	3	"GBP", "CRG", "Which One"
3	Playboi Carti	2	"Timeless", "Evil J0rdan", "Rather Lie"
3	The Weeknd	2	"Timeless", "Cry for Me", "Rather Lie"
2	Huntrix	20	"Golden", "How It's Done"
2	Chrystal	19	"The Days", "Dior"
2	Ed Sheeran	18	"Azizam", "Sapphire"
2	Saja Boys	12	"Your Idol", "Soda Pop"
2	Teddy Swims	12	"The Door", "Bad Dreams"
2	Lady Gaga	11	"Die With a Smile", "Abracadabra"
2	Doechii	10	"Denial is a River", "Anxiety"
2	Bruno Mars	7	"Die with a Smile", "APT."
2	George Michael ^{[G]}	5	"Last Christmas", "Do They Know It's Christmas?"
2	Lewis Capaldi	5	"Survive", "Something in the Heavens"
2	SZA	3	"Luther", "All the Stars"
2	Drake	2	"Nokia", "Which One"

== Notes ==
- ^{a} "Not Like Us" re-entered the top 10 at number 9 on 18 July 2024 (week ending), following the release of its music video.
- ^{b} "Not Like Us" re-entered the top 10 at number 10 on 1 August 2024 (week ending).
- ^{c} "Please Please Please" re-entered the top 10 at number 2 on 5 September 2024 (week ending) following the release of the album Short n' Sweet.
- ^{d} "Bed Chem" re-entered the top 10 at number 9 on 7 November 2024 (week ending).
- ^{e} "Last Christmas" re-entered the top 10 at number 8 on 5 December 2024 (week ending). The song originally peaked at number 2 upon its initial release in 1984 and reached number-one for the first time ever on 7 January 2021 (week ending).
- ^{f} "All I Want for Christmas Is You" re-entered the top 10 at number 10 on 5 December 2024 (week ending). The song originally peaked at number 2 upon its initial release in 1994 and reached number-one for the first time ever on 17 December 2020 (week ending).
- ^{g} Figure includes an appearance on the "Do They Know It's Christmas?" charity single by Band Aid.
- ^{h} "Rockin' Around the Christmas Tree" re-entered the top 10 at number 6 on 12 December 2024 (week ending). Having originally peaked at number 6 upon its original release in 1962, the song reached a new peak of number 4 on 5 January 2023 (week ending).
- ^{i} "Do They Know It's Christmas" re-entered the top 10 at number 8 on 12 December 2024 (week ending) following the release of its 2024 Ultimate Mix. The song originally peaked at number-one upon release in 1984.
- ^{j} "Jingle Bell Rock" re-entered the top 10 at number 10 on 12 December 2024 (week ending). The song entered the top 10 for the first time ever on 5 January 2023 (week ending), where it peaked at number 7. It reached a new peak of number 5 on 2 January 2025 (week ending).
- ^{k} "Fairytale of New York" re-entered the top 10 at number 8 on 19 December 2024 (week ending). The song originally peaked at number 2 upon release in 1987.
- ^{l} "Santa Tell Me" re-entered the top 10 at number 9 on 19 December 2024 (week ending). The song first charted at number 79 in 2014, and entered the top 10 for the first time at number 8 on 4 January 2024 (week ending).
- ^{m} "Underneath the Tree" entered the top 10 for the first time at number 10 on 19 December 2024 (week ending). The song first charted at number 30 in 2014, and later peaked at number 12 in 2022.
- ^{n} "Underneath the Tree" re-entered the top 10 at its new peak of number 7 on 2 January 2025 (week ending).
- ^{o} "Do They Know It's Christmas" re-entered the top 10 at number 9 on 2 January 2025 (week ending).
- ^{p} "Step into Christmas" re-entered the top 10 at number 10 on 2 January 2025 (week ending). Having originally peaked at number 24 upon its initial release in 1973, the song entered the top 10 for the first time on 3 January 2019 (week ending) at number 10. It reached its highest-ever chart peak of number 8 on 2 January 2020 (week ending).
- ^{q} "That's So True" re-entered the top 10 at number-one on 9 January 2025 (week ending).
- ^{r} "APT." re-entered the top 10 at number 2 on 9 January 2025 (week ending).
- ^{s} "Messy" re-entered the top 10 at number 3 on 9 January 2025 (week ending).
- ^{t} "Sailor Song" re-entered the top 10 at number 4 on 9 January 2025 (week ending)..
- ^{u} "The Door" re-entered the top 10 at number 6 on 9 January 2025 (week ending).
- ^{v} "Bad Dreams" re-entered the top 10 at number 7 on 9 January 2025 (week ending).
- ^{w} "Die with a Smile" re-entered the top 10 at number 8 on 9 January 2025 (week ending).
- ^{x} "Somedays" re-entered the top 10 at number 9 on 9 January 2025 (week ending)
- ^{y} "Defying Gravity" re-entered the top 10 at number 10 on 9 January 2025 (week ending).
- ^{z} Figure includes feature on "Defying Gravity".
- ^{aa} "Who" re-entered the top 10 at number 5 on 16 January 2025 (week ending).
- ^{bb} "Bed Chem" re-entered the top 10 at number 10 on 23 January 2025 (week ending).
- ^{cc} "Who" re-entered the top 10 at number 7 on 30 January 2025 (week ending).
- ^{dd} Figure includes feature on "CRG".
- ^{ee} "Bad Dreams" re-entered the top 10 at number 9 on 6 February 2025 (week ending), following the release of the album I've Tried Everything but Therapy (Part 2).
- ^{ff} "Timeless" re-entered the top 10 at number 7 on 13 February 2025 (week ending), following the release of the album Hurry Up Tomorrow.
- ^{gg} "Not Like Us" re-entered the top 10 at number 2 on 20 February 2025 (week ending), following Kendrick Lamar's performance at the Super Bowl LIX halftime show.
- ^{hh} "Beautiful Things" re-entered the top 10 at number 6 on 20 February 2025 (week ending).
- ^{ii} "Luther" re-entered the top 10 at number 10 on 20 February 2025 (week ending), following Kendrick Lamar's performance at the Super Bowl LIX halftime show.
- ^{jj} "All the Stars" originally peaked at number 5 upon its initial release in 2018. It re-entered the top 10 at number 5 on 27 February 2025 (week ending), following Kendrick Lamar and SZA's performance at the Super Bowl LIX halftime show.
- ^{kk} "Please Please Please" re-entered the top 10 at number 9 on 27 February 2025 (week ending), following the release of the subsequent remix featuring Dolly Parton and the deluxe edition of the album Short n' Sweet.
- ^{ll} "Sports Car" re-entered the top 10 at number 3 on 6 March 2025 (week ending), following the release of the album So Close to What.
- ^{mm} "Ordinary" re-entered the top 10 at number 8 on 6 March 2025 (week ending).
- ^{nn} "Nice to Meet You" re-entered the top 10 at number 8 on 13 March 2025 (week ending), following Myles Smith's performance at the Brit Awards 2025.
- ^{oo} "Bad Dreams" re-entered the top 10 at number 10 on 13 March 2025 (week ending), following Teddy Swims' performance at the Brit Awards 2025.
- ^{pp} "Busy Woman" re-entered the top 10 at number 8 on 20 March 2025 (week ending), following Carpenter's UK leg of the Short n' Sweet Tour.
- ^{qq} "Bad Dreams" re-entered the top 10 at number 9 on 3 April 2025 (week ending).
- ^{rr} "Bad Dreams" re-entered the top 10 at number 9 on 24 April 2025 (week ending).
- ^{ss} "Bad Dreams" re-entered the top 10 at number 9 on 22 May 2025 (week ending).
- ^{tt} "Nice to Meet You" re-entered the top 10 at number 10 on 22 May 2025 (week ending).
- ^{uu} "Sapphire" re-entered the top 10 at number 9 on 10 July 2025 (week ending).
- ^{vv} "Rein Me In" re-entered the top 10 at number 10 on 17 July 2025 (week ending).
- ^{ww} "Ordinary" re-entered the top 10 at number 8 on 21 August 2025 (week ending).
- ^{xx} "Beautiful Things" re-entered the top 10 at number 10 on 21 August 2025 (week ending).
- ^{yy} "Nice to Each Other" re-entered the top 10 at number 9 on 28 August 2025 (week ending).
- ^{zz} "Rein Me In" re-entered the top 10 at number 10 on 4 September 2025 (week ending).
- ^{aaa} "Manchild" re-entered the top 10 at number 4 on 11 September 2025 (week ending), following the release of the album Man's Best Friend.
- ^{bbb} "Rein Me In" re-entered the top 10 at number 10 on 25 September 2025 (week ending).
- ^{ccc} "So Easy (To Fall in Love)" re-entered the top 10 at number 8 on 23 October 2025 (week ending).
- ^{ddd} "Rein Me In" re-entered the top 10 at number 10 on 30 October 2025 (week ending).
- ^{eee} "Thriller" originally peaked at number 10 upon its initial release in 1983. It re-entered the top 10 at a brand new peak of number 9 on 13 November 2025 (week ending).
- ^{fff} "Rein Me In" re-entered the top 10 at number 8 on 20 November 2025 (week ending).
- ^{ggg} "How It's Done" re-entered the top 10 at number 10 on 20 November 2025 (week ending).
- ^{hhh} "Last Christmas" re-entered the top 10 at number 9 on 4 December 2025 (week ending).
- ^{iii} "All I Want for Christmas Is You" re-entered the top 10 at number 4 on 11 December 2025 (week ending).
- ^{jjj} "Rockin' Around the Christmas Tree" re-entered the top 10 at number 6 on 11 December 2025 (week ending). It reached a new chart peak of number 3 on 1 January 2026 (week ending).
- ^{kkk} "Underneath the Tree" re-entered the top 10 at number 9 on 11 December 2025 (week ending). It reached a new chart peak of number 5 on 18 December 2025 (week ending).
- ^{lll} "Santa Tell Me" re-entered the top 10 at number 10 on 11 December 2025 (week ending).
- ^{mmm} "Fairytale of New York" re-entered the top 10 at number 8 on 18 December 2025 (week ending).
- ^{nnn} "Jingle Bell Rock" re-entered the top 10 at number 10 on 18 December 2025 (week ending).
- ^{ooo} "Raindance" re-entered the top 10 at number 7 on 25 December 2025 (week ending).
- ^{ppp} "Step into Christmas" re-entered the top 10 at number 9 on 25 December 2025 (week ending). It reached a new chart peak of number 7 on 1 January 2026 (week ending).
- ^{qqq} "Where Is My Husband!" re-entered the top 10 at number-one on 8 January 2026 (week ending).
- ^{rrr} "The Fate of Ophelia" re-entered the top 10 at number 2 on 8 January 2026 (week ending).
- ^{sss} "Raindance" re-entered the top 10 at number 3 on 8 January 2026 (week ending).
- ^{ttt} "So Easy (To Fall in Love)" re-entered the top 10 at number 4 on 8 January 2026 (week ending).
- ^{uuu} "Rein Me In" re-entered the top 10 at number 5 on 8 January 2026 (week ending).
- ^{vvv} "Man I Need" re-entered the top 10 at number 6 on 8 January 2026 (week ending).
- ^{www} "Golden" re-entered the top 10 at number 8 on 8 January 2026 (week ending).
- ^{xxx} "Die on This Hill" re-entered the top 10 at number 10 on 22 January 2026 (week ending).
- ^{yyy} "Opalite" re-entered the top 10 at number-one on 19 February 2026 (week ending), following the release of the song's music video as the second single from the album The Life of a Showgirl.
- ^{zzz} "Man I Need" re-entered the top 10 at number 8 on 19 February 2026 (week ending).
- ^{aaaa} "Daisies" re-entered the top 10 at number 5 on 30 April 2026 (week ending), following Bieber's performance of it at Coachella 2026.
- ^{bbbb} "Man I Need" re-entered the top 10 at number 9 on 7 May 2026 (week ending).
- ^{cccc} "Man I Need" re-entered the top 10 at number 10 on 6 August 2026 (week ending).
- ^{dddd} "Man I Need" re-entered the top 10 at number 10 on 27 August 2026 (week ending).
- ^{eeee} "Die on This Hill" re-entered the top 10 at number 10 on 24 September 2026 (week ending).
- ^{ffff} "Rein Me In" re-entered the top 10 at number 9 on 22 October 2026 (week ending).
- ^{gggg} "Rein Me In" re-entered the top 10 at number 8 on 5 November 2026 (week ending).
- ^{hhhh} "Man I Need" re-entered the top 10 at number 10 on 26 November 2026 (week ending).
