= Co-op Academy North Manchester =

Location
- 300 Victoria Avenue East; Blackley; Manchester, Greater Manchester, M9 7SS; England; 53.5268°N 2.1806°W

Information
- Type: Academy
- Motto: Respect, Commitment, Trust
- Established: 2009
- Department for Education URN: 142762 Tables
- Ofsted: Reports
- Headteacher: Sharon Hands
- Gender: Boys & Girls
- Age: 11 to 16
- Colours: Purple, Yellow, Blue, Green, Silver
- Website: www.northmanchester.coopacademies.co.uk

Co-op Academy North Manchester, formerly known as Manchester Creative and Media Academy, is a secondary school located in Blackley, Manchester, UK. First established in 2009, the school relocated to a brand new building in 2012 costing about £3.5 Million. The school offers high school education from year 7–11.

In 2015, the school was taken over by the Co-operative Academies Trust. The musician Chrystal is an alumnus.

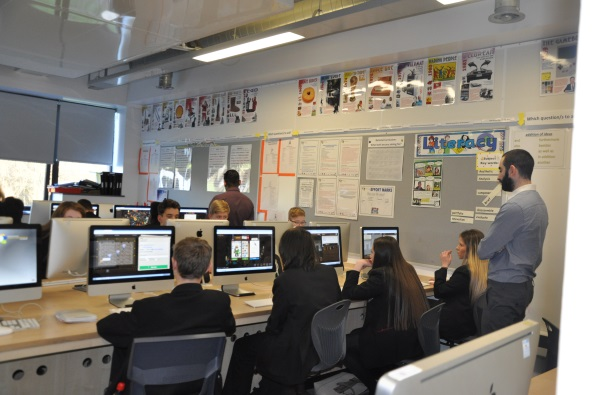
Graphics and ICT class room

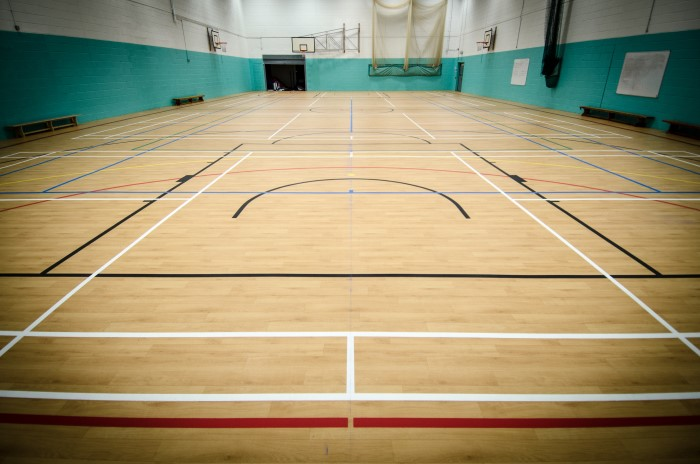
Indoor Sports Hall

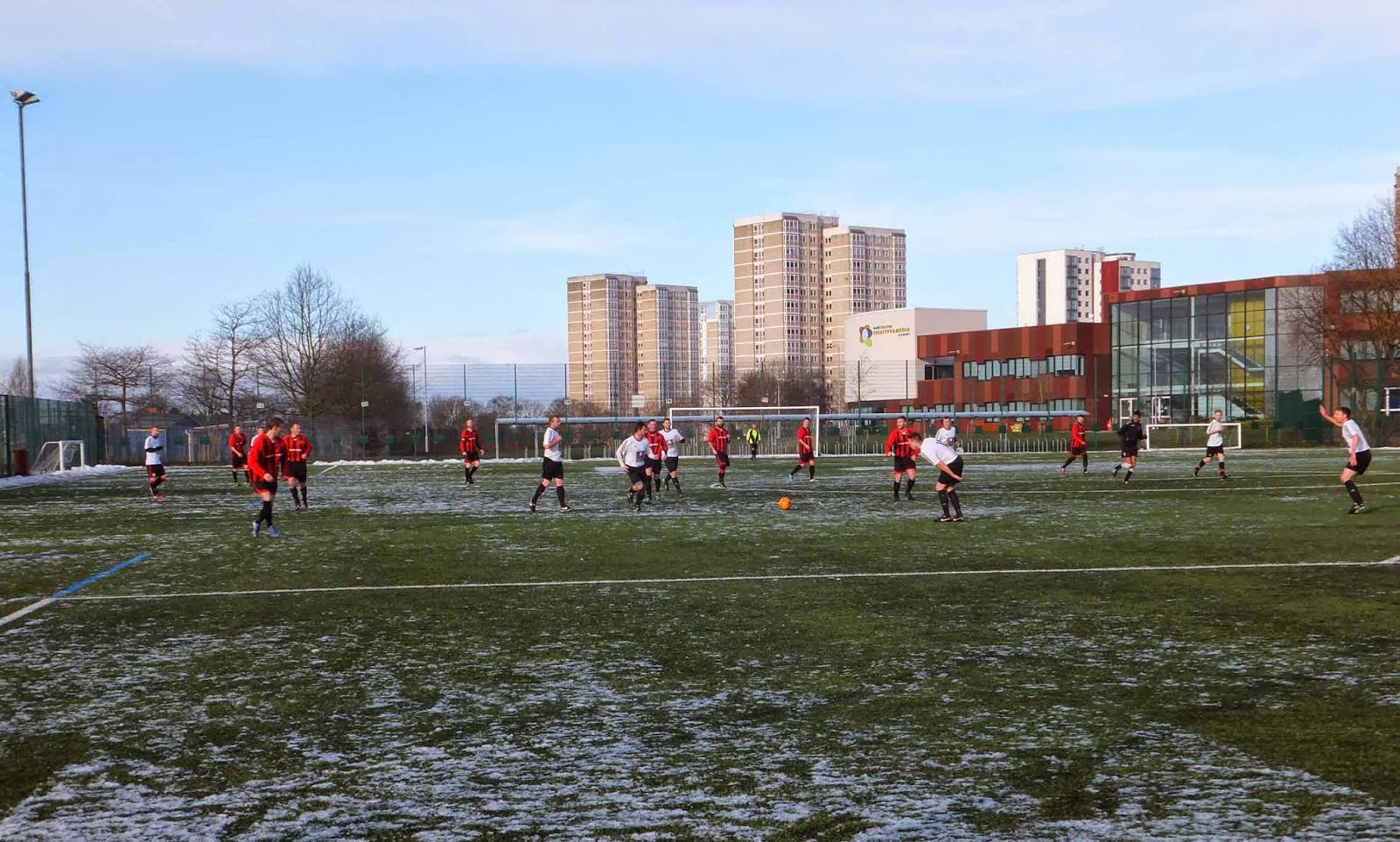
Outdoor Sports Pitch
