= Show Me Love (WizTheMc and Bees & Honey song) =

2025 single by WizTheMc

- Standard cover

Single by WizTheMc and Bees & Honey

from the album Yebo
- Released: 7 February 2025
- Recorded: 2024
- Genre: Amapiano; electronic; pop; R&B
- Length: 2:56
- Label: Bamboo Artists; FAX; Epic
- Songwriters: Alexsej Vlasenko; Jonas Kalisch; Jeremy Chacon; Sanele David Sycow; Henrik Meinke; Tyla Seethal
- Producers: Hitimpulse; Bees & Honey

WizTheMc singles chronology
| "Let You In" (2024) | "Show Me Love" (2025) | "Take My Mind" (2025) |

Bees & Honey singles chronology
| "Solo" (2024) | "Show Me Love" (2025) | "Ice 2 Water" (2025) |

Music video
- "Show Me Love" on YouTube

Tyla remix
- Remix cover

Tyla singles chronology
| "Push 2 Start" (Remix) (2025) | "Show Me Love" (Remix) (2025) | "Bliss" (2025) |

Music video
- "Show Me Love (with Tyla)" on YouTube

"Show Me Love" is a song recorded by South African–German recording artist WizTheMc and German-British production collective Bees & Honey. It was released on 7 February 2025 by Bamboo Artists. A remix featuring guest vocals from South African singer Tyla was released on 18 April 2025, with Tyla appearing courtesy of FAX and Epic Records. That same year, "Show Me Love" was serviced to Italian radio stations on 22 April.

== Background ==
"Show Me Love" is a song by South African and German recording artist WizTheMc and the London and Berlin-based record production duo Bees & Honey. The duo produced the song alongside Hitimpulse. Independently released by Bamboo Artists on 7 February 2025, "Show Me Love" was promoted and distributed by TikTok's digital music promotion and distribution platform, SoundOn.

== Composition ==
"Show Me Love" is 2 minutes and 56 seconds long. It is a smooth R&B, pop and electronic track infused with elements of amapiano. Writing for New Wave magazine, Tyrese King described it as "a perfect daydream". Wiz is heard expressing his feelings for a romantic partner with sincere openness and heartfelt tenderness, immersed in love. On the remix, Tyla brings her gentle, alluring voice and vivid romantic imagery, singing, "I'm so high, I'm floating. We’re in the clouds with the sun in our eyes".

== Live performances ==
"Show Me Love" was live debuted during Tyla's Coachella 2025 set and Wiz appeared as a featured guest.

== Commercial performance ==
"Show Me Love" had over 1.6 million creations and 2.7 billion views on TikTok, in addition to 74 million streams on Spotify, as of 7 April 2025. It peaked at number 10 on the Billboard Global 200 chart.

In his native South Africa, "Show Me Love" debuted at number 11 on the Official South African Charts, and reached number 3 in Germany on the GfK Entertainment charts. In the UK, on the chart dated 28 February 2025, the song debuted at number 5 on the Independent Singles Breakers Chart and later peaked at number 2. That same week, it debuted at number 46 on the Independent Singles Chart and eventually peaked at number 1. The song's weekly consumption rose 6.5% to 19,274 units, according to the Official Charts Company, driven by approximately 2.3 million UK streams. Since its February release, it has accumulated 74,299 units. On the chart dated 2 May 2025, "Show Me Love" reached number 3 on the UK Singles Chart, number 4 on the Official Streaming Chart, and number 19 on the Singles Downloads Chart.

In other territories, "Show Me Love" debuted at number 4 on the Bubbling Under Hot 100 and number 27 on the Rhythmic Airplay in the U.S. In Belgium, it reached number 3 in Wallonia, and number 7 in Flanders. The song peaked at number 4 on the Dutch Single Top 100 in the Netherlands, number 10 on the Polish music charts, number 6 on the Ö3 Austria Top 40, number 11 in Hungary, and number 32 on the Canadian Hot 100. "Show Me Love" reached number 2 in Sweden, number 4 in Switzerland, number 7 in Ireland, and number 16 in New Zealand. On the airplay charts, the song reached number 3 on the Official Lebanese Top 20, and number 2 on the Turkish Radio Charts.

"Show Me Love" was certified diamond in France by the National Syndicate of Phonographic Publishing for selling 333,333 equivalent units. In the UK, it was certified platinum by the British Phonographic Industry for exceeding 600,000 units. The song also received platinum certification from IFPI Greece for accumulating 2,000,000 streaming figures. Additionally, "Show Me Love" was certified platinum by IFPI Danmark for 90,000 units sold.

== Accolades ==
Awards and nominations received for "Show Me Love"
| Award | Year (Note: Indicates the year of ceremony. Each year is linked to the article about the awards held that year, wherever possible.) | Category | Version | Result | Ref. |
|---|---|---|---|---|---|
| Nickelodeon Kids' Choice Awards | 2025 | Favorite Music Collaboration | Remix | Nominated | |

== Credits and personnel ==
Credits were adapted from Apple Music.

Musicians

- WizTheMc – vocals, songwriter, percussion
- Tyla – vocals
- bees & honey – recorder
- Jonas Kalisch – drums, songwriter
- Alexsej Vlasenko – piano, songwriter
- Jeremy Chacon – bass guitar, songwriter
- Henrik Meinke – synthesizer, songwriter
- Hitimpulse – producer
- Paco Bose – co-producer

Technicals

- Charlie Rolfe – recording engineer
- Josh Gudwin – mixing engineer
- Gudwin Soun – mixing engineer
- Felix Byrne – assistant recording engineer
- Lex Berkey – mastering engineer
- Paco Bose – assistant mastering engineer

== Charts ==
=== Weekly charts ===
Weekly chart performance for "Show Me Love"
| Chart (2025) | Peak position |
|---|---|
| Australia New Music Singles (ARIA) | 14 |
| Austria (Ö3 Austria Top 40) | 2 |
| Belgium (Ultratop 50 Flanders) | 7 |
| Belgium (Ultratop 50 Wallonia) | 3 |
| Bolivia Anglo Airplay (Monitor Latino) | 10 |
| Canada (Canadian Hot 100) | 32 |
| Colombia Anglo Airplay (Monitor Latino) | 6 |
| CIS Airplay (TopHit) | 46 |
| Costa Rica Anglo Airplay (Monitor Latino) | 11 |
| Croatia International Airplay (Top lista) | 19 |
| Denmark (Tracklisten) | 16 |
| Estonia Airplay (TopHit) | 2 |
| France (SNEP) | 24 |
| Germany (GfK) | 3 |
| Global 200 (Billboard) | 10 |
| Greece International (IFPI) | 2 |
| Greece International (IFPI) Remix version | 8 |
| Hungary (Single Top 40) | 11 |
| India International (IMI) | 5 |
| Ireland (IRMA) | 6 |
| Israel (Mako Hitlist) | 21 |
| Italy (FIMI) | 36 |
| Latvia Airplay (LaIPA) | 14 |
| Latvia Streaming (LaIPA) | 4 |
| Lebanon (Lebanese Top 20) | 3 |
| Lithuania (AGATA) | 10 |
| Lithuania Airplay (TopHit) | 3 |
| Luxembourg (Billboard) | 2 |
| Malta Airplay (Radiomonitor) | 2 |
| Middle East and North Africa (IFPI) | 13 |
| Moldova Airplay (TopHit) | 5 |
| Netherlands (Dutch Top 40) | 4 |
| Netherlands (Single Top 100) | 4 |
| New Zealand (Recorded Music NZ) | 16 |
| Nigeria (TurnTable Top 100) Remix version | 59 |
| North Macedonia Airplay (Radiomonitor) | 19 |
| Norway (VG-lista) | 5 |
| Norway (IFPI Norge) Remix version | 48 |
| Poland (Polish Airplay Top 100) | 7 |
| Poland (Polish Streaming Top 100) | 10 |
| Portugal (AFP) | 6 |
| Romania Airplay (Media Forest) | 7 |
| Singapore (RIAS) | 26 |
| Slovakia Airplay (ČNS IFPI) | 1 |
| Slovakia Singles Digital (ČNS IFPI) | 15 |
| South Africa Streaming (TOSAC) | 11 |
| Suriname (Nationale Top 40) | 1 |
| Sweden (Sverigetopplistan) | 4 |
| Switzerland (Schweizer Hitparade) | 2 |
| Turkey International Airplay (Radiomonitor Türkiye) | 2 |
| United Arab Emirates (IFPI) | 8 |
| UK Singles (Official Charts) | 3 |
| UK Indie (Official Charts) | 1 |
| Uruguay Anglo Airplay (Monitor Latino) | 11 |
| US Bubbling Under Hot 100 (Billboard) | 4 |
| US Pop Airplay (Billboard) | 37 |
| US Rhythmic (Billboard) | 27 |
| Venezuela Anglo Airplay (Monitor Latino) | 7 |

=== Monthly charts ===
Monthly chart performance for "Show Me Love"
| Chart (2025) | Peak position |
|---|---|
| CIS Airplay (TopHit) | 49 |
| Estonia Airplay (TopHit) | 4 |
| Lithuania Airplay (TopHit) | 3 |
| Moldova Airplay (TopHit) | 5 |
| Romania Airplay (TopHit) | 49 |

=== Year-end charts ===
Year-end chart performance for "Show Me Love"
| Chart (2025) | Position |
|---|---|
| Austria (Ö3 Austria Top 40) | 10 |
| Belgium (Ultratop 50 Flanders) | 13 |
| Belgium (Ultratop 50 Wallonia) | 10 |
| Canada (Canadian Hot 100) | 72 |
| CIS Airplay (TopHit) | 165 |
| Estonia Airplay (TopHit) | 14 |
| France (SNEP) | 63 |
| Germany (GfK) | 9 |
| Global 200 (Billboard) | 68 |
| Hungary (Single Top 40) | 35 |
| Italy (FIMI) | 86 |
| Lithuania Airplay (TopHit) | 9 |
| Moldova Airplay (TopHit) | 37 |
| Netherlands (Dutch Top 40) | 14 |
| Netherlands (Single Top 100) | 7 |
| Poland (Polish Airplay Top 100) | 49 |
| Poland (Polish Streaming Top 100) | 32 |
| Romania Airplay (TopHit) | 126 |
| Sweden (Sverigetopplistan) | 19 |
| Switzerland (Schweizer Hitparade) | 8 |
| UK Singles (OCC) | 32 |

== Certifications ==
Certifications for "Show Me Love"
| Region | Certification | Certified units/sales |
|---|---|---|
| Austria (IFPI Austria) | 2× Platinum | 60,000^{‡} |
| Denmark (IFPI Danmark) | Platinum | 90,000^{‡} |
| France (SNEP) | Diamond | 333,333^{‡} |
| Italy (FIMI) | Gold | 100,000^{‡} |
| New Zealand (RMNZ) | Platinum | 30,000^{‡} |
| Spain (Promusicae) | Gold | 50,000^{‡} |
| United Kingdom (BPI) | Platinum | 600,000^{‡} |
Streaming
| Greece (IFPI Greece) | Platinum | 2,000,000^{†} |
| Greece (IFPI Greece) Remix version | Gold | 1,000,000^{†} |
| Slovakia (ČNS IFPI) | Platinum | 1,700,000 |
| Sweden (GLF) | 2× Platinum | 24,000,000^{†} |
^{‡} Sales+streaming figures based on certification alone.^{†} Streaming-only figures based on certification alone.

== Release history ==
Release history for "Show Me Love"
| Region | Date | Format(s) | Label(s) | Version | Ref. |
|---|---|---|---|---|---|
| Various | 7 February 2025 | Digital download; streaming | Bamboo | Original | |
| Various | 18 April 2025 | Digital download; streaming | Bamboo; FAX; Epic | Tyla's | |
| Italy | 22 April 2025 | Radio airplay | Bamboo | Original | |
| United States | 12 August 2025 | Contemporary hit radio | Epic | Original | |

== See also ==
- List of top 10 singles in 2025 (Ireland)
- List of UK top-ten singles in 2025
- List of artists by number of UK Independent Singles Chart number ones
