= WizTheMc =

South African-German musician and producer (born 1999)

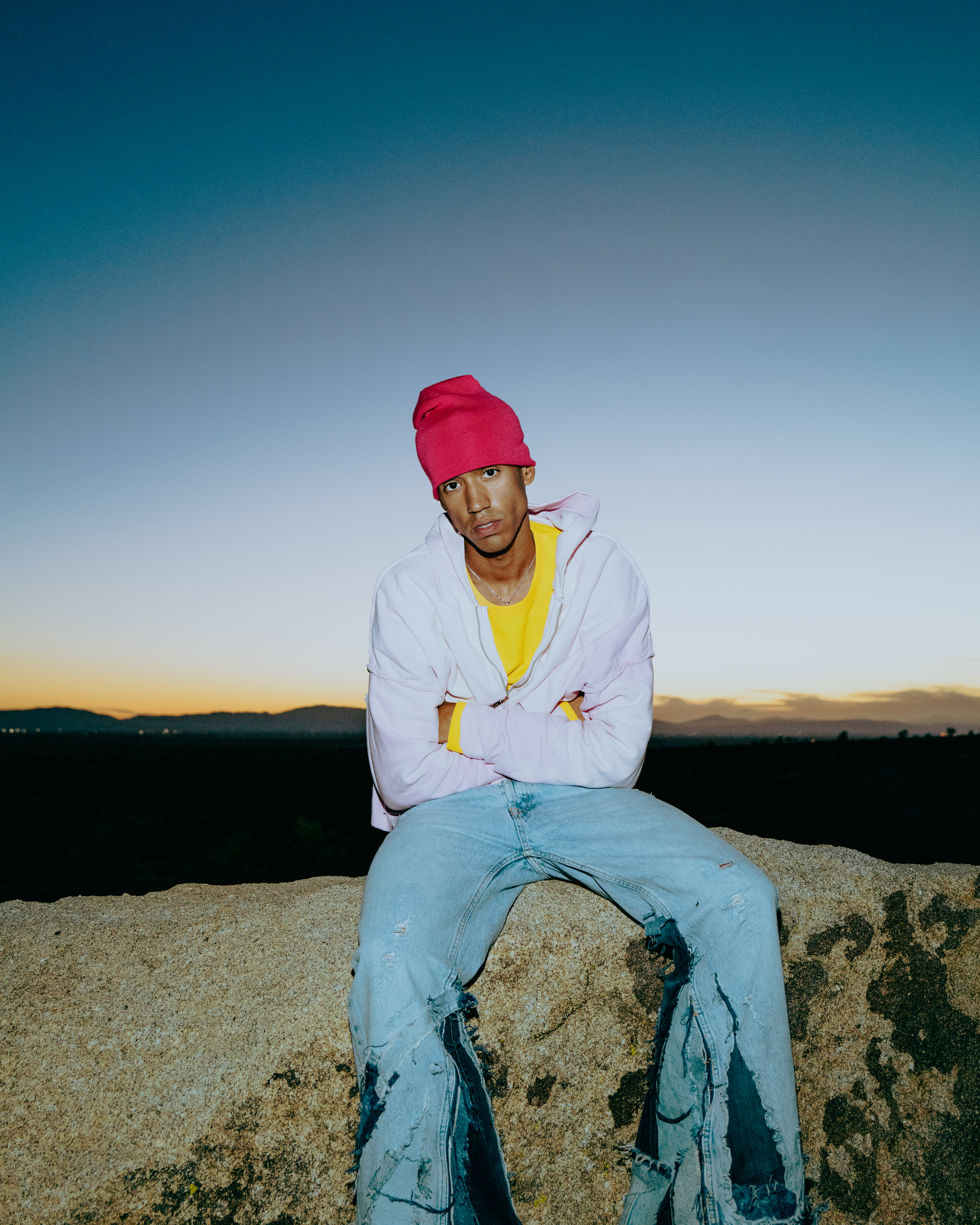
- Sydow in 2025

Background information
- Also known as: WizTheMc
- Born: Sanele Sydow; 4 January 1999 (age 27); Cape Town, South Africa
- Occupations: Singer; songwriter; record producer
- Years active: 2015–present
- Labels: Bamboo Artists, 10k Projects
- Formerly of: NOHOMES

Sanele Sydow (born 4 January 1999), better known by his stage name WizTheMc, is a South African singer-songwriter and record producer based in Berlin, Germany. He gained recognition for his 2020 single "For a Minute", which has over 76 million streams on Spotify, his 2025 collaboration with Bees & Honey, "Show Me Love" which has achieved gold certification in the UK, and top five chart positions in the UK and Germany with over 193M streams on Spotify.

Since 2018, he has released three mixtapes, eight EPs, one compilation album, and over a dozen singles. He has also toured across Europe, United States, and Canada with artists like Lola Young, Half Alive, Charlie Curtis-Beard, Dave East, Kid Bloom, RIZ LA VIE, Francis Karel, and UPSAHL.

== Early life ==
Sanele Sydow was born in 1999 in Cape Town, South Africa. In 2001, at the age of 2, his family immigrated to Lüneburg, Lower Saxony where he grew up.

== Career ==
In 2015, WizTheMc and his friends formed a musical collective called "NOHOMES" in Germany. The group was active for 2 years before they separated. In 2017, Sydow moved to Toronto, Canada, to pursue a solo music career where he started producing and releasing music.

In 2018, WizTheMc released his first two albums, Backin Toronto and Blessings in Disguise. He would go on and release multiple singles including his breakout single "For a Minute" which has been featured on Grey's Anatomy, Facebook messenger, and the Netflix film He's All That (2021). His third album Growing Teeth was released in January 2020. In 2020, WizTheMc signed to 10K Projects in the United States. Shortly after, he released the EP ‘What About Now’, featuring his breakthrough hit ‘For A Minute’. After signing to Bamboo Artists in 2025, WizTheMc released single ‘Show Me Love’ in collaboration with Bees & Honey. ‘Show Me Love’ reached international acclaim, reaching top 10 on Billboard’s Global 200 list. On April 18, 2025, WizTheMc debuted and performed ‘Show Me Love (with Tyla)’ at Coachella. The remix was nominated for ‘Favorite Music Collaboration’ at Nickelodeon’s Kids’ Choice Awards 2025. Also in 2025, WizTheMc and British singer-songwriter Rag'n'Bone Man contributed an original song, "GOODLIFE", for the soundtrack of the American animated heist comedy film The Bad Guys 2 (the sequel to the 2022 film The Bad Guys, both loosely based on the children's book series by Australian author and former actor Aaron Blabey) and was released as a promotional single and the lead single from the soundtrack on 11 July 2025.

== Discography ==
=== Albums ===
List of studio albums, with selected details
Title	Album details
Backin Toronto	Released: 1 August 2018; Label: NHMS Records; Formats: Streaming, CD, digital download
Blessings in Disguise	Released: 11 November 2018; Label: NHMS Records; Formats: CD, digital download
Growing Teeth	Released: 31 January 2020; Label: NHMS Records; Formats: CD, digital download
Yebo	Releasing: 7 November 2025; Label: NHMS Records; Formats: CD, digital download

=== EPs ===
List of extended plays, with selected details
Title	Details
Spring	Release: 2018; Label: Formats: Streaming, digital download
CapeTown'18	Released: 2018; Label: Formats: Streaming, digital download
Birthtape	Released: 2019; Label: Formats: Streaming, digital download
Your Valentine	Released: 14 February 2019; Label: NHMS; Formats: Streaming, digital download
Nothing Bigger Than Little Things	Released: 1 April 2019; Label: NHMS; Formats: Streaming, digital download
What About Now	Released: 30 October 2020; Label: NHMS, Homemade Projects, 10K Projects; Formats: Streaming, digital download
Where Silence Feels Good	Released: 4 February 2022; Label: NHMS, Homemade Projects, 10K Projects; Formats: Streaming, digital download
Where Silence Feels Good (deluxe)	Released: 17 June 2022; Label: NHMS, Homemade Projects, 10K Projects; Formats: Streaming, digital download

=== Compilations ===
List of compilations with selected details
Title	Details
Headliners: WizTheMc	Released: 19 October 2021; Label: Universal Music Group; Formats: Streaming, digital download

=== Singles ===
List of singles as lead artist, with selected chart positions and certifications, showing year released and album name
Title	Year	Peak chart positions										Certifications	Album
Title	Year	SA	GER	AUT	CAN	NLD	NOR	SWE	SWI	UK	WW	Certifications	Album
"Promises"	2018	—	—	—	—	—	—	—	—	—	—		Non-album singles
"Dreams"	2018	—	—	—	—	—	—	—	—	—	—		Non-album singles
"Leave"	2018	—	—	—	—	—	—	—	—	—	—		Non-album singles
"Date"	2018	—	—	—	—	—	—	—	—	—	—		Non-album singles
"Other Side"	2018	—	—	—	—	—	—	—	—	—	—		Non-album singles
"No Money on My Card"	2018	—	—	—	—	—	—	—	—	—	—		Non-album singles
"Know"	2019	—	—	—	—	—	—	—	—	—	—		Non-album singles
"Decide"	2019	—	—	—	—	—	—	—	—	—	—		Non-album singles
"Milk in My Coffee"	2019	—	—	—	—	—	—	—	—	—	—		Non-album singles
"Goodtime"	2019	—	—	—	—	—	—	—	—	—	—		Non-album singles
"Mission"	2019	—	—	—	—	—	—	—	—	—	—		Non-album singles
"Upset"	2019	—	—	—	—	—	—	—	—	—	—		Non-album singles
"Call"	2019	—	—	—	—	—	—	—	—	—	—		Non-album singles
"One Way"	2019	—	—	—	—	—	—	—	—	—	—		Non-album singles
"Becoming"	2019	—	—	—	—	—	—	—	—	—	—		Non-album singles
"Autumn"	2019	—	—	—	—	—	—	—	—	—	—		Non-album singles
"Sign"	2019	—	—	—	—	—	—	—	—	—	—		Non-album singles
"Do What I Want"	2019	—	—	—	—	—	—	—	—	—	—		Non-album singles
"R.O.O.T"	2019	—	—	—	—	—	—	—	—	—	—		Non-album singles
"On My Mind"	2019	—	—	—	—	—	—	—	—	—	—		Non-album singles
"Patience (Live)"	2020	—	—	—	—	—	—	—	—	—	—		Non-album singles
"For a Minute"	2020	—	—	—	—	—	—	—	—	—	—		What About Now
"Lied"	2020	—	—	—	—	—	—	—	—	—	—		What About Now
"WhoWho"	2020	—	—	—	—	—	—	—	—	—	—		What About Now
"World Is Fucked"	2021	—	—	—	—	—	—	—	—	—	—		Non-album singles
"Catch Me"	2021	—	—	—	—	—	—	—	—	—	—		Non-album singles
"Everything"	2021	—	—	—	—	—	—	—	—	—	—		Where Silence Feels Good
"Break"	2021	—	—	—	—	—	—	—	—	—	—		Where Silence Feels Good
"Do It Over"	2021	—	—	—	—	—	—	—	—	—	—		Where Silence Feels Good
"Stoned Nights"	2021	—	—	—	—	—	—	—	—	—	—		Where Silence Feels Good
"Like That"	2022	—	—	—	—	—	—	—	—	—	—		Where Silence Feels Good
"Fck Love" (with Benee)	2022	—	—	—	—	—	—	—	—	—	—		Where Silence Feels Good (Deluxe)
"When I Get Lonely"	2022	—	—	—	—	—	—	—	—	—	—		Non-album single
"Show Me Love" (with Bees & Honey)	2025	11	3	2	32	4	5	4	2	3	10	BPI: Platinum; GLF: 2× Platinum; IFPI AUT: 2× Platinum	Yebo
"Take My Mind" (with Bees & Honey)	2025	—	23	25	—	33	61	17	18	62	—		Yebo
"Sensational" (with Bees & Honey)	2025	—	—	—	—	—	—	—	—	—	—		Yebo
"Wait for You"	2026	—	—	—	—	—	—	—	—	—	—		Non-album single

== Tours and festivals ==
=== Tours ===
==== Supporting ====
- Francis Karel: Summer Tour (2023)
- UPSAHL: This is Still My First Headline Tour (2023)
- Half Alive: Give Me Your Shoulders Tour (with Half Alive, 2022)
- The Troubadour (with Kid Bloom, 2022)
- Half.Alive (with Half Alive, 2023)
- The Kid LAROI: A Perfect World Tour

=== Festivals ===
- Reeperbahn Festival (2026)
- Summerjam Festival (2026)
- ING Silesia Beats / Park Śląski (2026
- Open'er Festival (2025)
- FM4 Frequency Festival (2025)
- Mary Jane Festival (2025)
- Coachella (special guest, Tyla) (2025)
- Reeperbahn Festival (2024)
- Golden Leaves Festival (2024)
- Osheaga Festival (with ASAP Rocky, Burna Boy, Khruangbin, 2022)
- Austin City Limits (2021)
