= Dior (MK song) =

Single by MK featuring Chrystal

from the album In the Night Again
- Released: June 6, 2025
- Genre: Deep house; dance-pop
- Length: 2:49
- Label: Sony UK; Ultra
- Songwriters: Marc Kinchen; Chrystal Orchard; Emily Nash; Jacob Manson
- Producers: MK; Emily Nash; Larry Latenight

MK singles chronology
"Next to Me" (2024)	"Dior" (2025)	"Come Find Me" (2025)

Chrystal singles chronology
"The Days (Notion Remix)" (2024)	"Dior" (2025)

"Dior" is a song by American DJ and producer MK and British singer Chrystal. It was released on June 6, 2025, through Sony Music Entertainment UK and Ultra Records. "Dior" peaked at the top of the UK Singles Chart. Outside the United Kingdom, "Dior" peaked within the top ten of the charts in Ireland.

== Background and composition ==
Ahead of its release, MK played the song during several of his 2025 sets, including at Coachella 2025 and various other festival dates in Australia and the United States. "Dior" combines MK's "signature blend of deep basslines" with "fresh, soulful vocals" by Chrystal, resulting in a "dance-pop" crossover track.

In response to its commercial success, MK expressed his gratitude, calling it "crazy" and unexpected.

== Critical reception ==
Official Charts Company highlighted Chystal's "irresistibly smooth vocals" while also praising the production's "effortless cool, blending deep, groove-heavy beats". They concluded that the song lives up to its title, noting it "oozes elegance and edge" and combines "late-night glam and high-fashion attitude".

== Charts ==
=== Weekly charts ===
Weekly chart performance for "Dior"
Chart (2025)	Peak position
Australia (ARIA)	53
Australia Dance (ARIA)	3
Belarus Airplay (TopHit)	180
Belgium (Ultratop 50 Flanders)	21
Croatia International Airplay (Top lista)	9
Estonia Airplay (TopHit)	47
Germany Dance (GfK)	14
Ireland (IRMA)	2
Latvia Airplay (LaIPA)	3
Latvia Streaming (LaIPA)	20
Lithuania (AGATA)	16
Lithuania Airplay (TopHit)	1
Malta Airplay (Radiomonitor)	3
Netherlands (Dutch Top 40)	34
Netherlands (Single Top 100)	24
North Macedonia Airplay (Radiomonitor)	2
Poland (Polish Airplay Top 100)	31
UK Singles (Official Charts)	1
UK Dance (Official Charts)	1
US Hot Dance/Electronic Songs (Billboard)	10

=== Monthly charts ===
Monthly chart performance for "Dior"
Chart (2025)	Peak position
Estonia Airplay (TopHit)	72
Latvia Airplay (TopHit)	8
Lithuania Airplay (TopHit)	1

=== Year-end charts ===
Year-end chart performance for "Dior"
Chart (2025)	Position
Belgium (Ultratop 50 Flanders)	85
Latvia Airplay (TopHit)	9
Lithuania Airplay (TopHit)	26
UK Singles (OCC)	40
US Hot Dance/Electronic Songs (Billboard)	30

== Certifications ==
Certifications for "Dior"
Region	Certification	Certified units/sales
Australia (ARIA)	Gold	35,000^{‡}
Belgium (BRMA)	Platinum	40,000^{‡}
Hungary (MAHASZ)	Gold	2,000^{‡}
New Zealand (RMNZ)	Gold	15,000^{‡}
Poland (ZPAV)	Gold	62,500^{‡}
United Kingdom (BPI)	Platinum	600,000^{‡}
^{‡} Sales+streaming figures based on certification alone.
