= The Days (Chrystal song) =

2024 single by Chrystal

- 2024 single cover

Single by Chrystal

from the album Unarchived 2015
- Released: 1 October 2024
- Genre: House
- Length: 2:49
- Label: Polydor
- Songwriter: Chrystal Orchard
- Producer: Chrystal

Chrystal singles chronology
"On a Regular" (2023)	"The Days" (2024)	"Dior" (2025)

"The Days" is a song by British musician Chrystal. Written in 2015 but not released until 2024, the track received additional attention due to its remix by British producer Notion. The remix went viral on the video-sharing app TikTok in late 2024 and reached number one in Latvia and New Zealand, while also charting in the top five in Australia, Ireland, Lithuania, and the United Kingdom.

== Charts ==
=== Weekly charts ===
Weekly chart performance for "The Days"
Chart (2024–2025)	Peak position
Austria (Ö3 Austria Top 40)	13
Belgium (Ultratop 50 Flanders)	35
Canada (Canadian Hot 100)	39
Canada CHR/Top 40 (Billboard)	39
Estonia Airplay (TopHit)	74
Germany (GfK)	19
Global 200 (Billboard)	47
Ireland (IRMA)	4
Latvia Airplay (LaIPA)	5
Lithuania (AGATA)	21
Lithuania Airplay (TopHit)	62
Netherlands (Single Top 100)	51
Nigeria (TurnTable Top 100)	86
Sweden (Sverigetopplistan)	22
Switzerland (Schweizer Hitparade)	46
UK Singles (Official Charts)	4
UK Dance (Official Charts)	1
US Billboard Hot 100	83
US Hot Dance/Electronic Songs (Billboard)	2

Weekly chart performance for "The Days" (Notion Remix)
Chart (2025)	Peak position
Australia (ARIA)	5
Czech Republic Singles Digital (ČNS IFPI)	19
Estonia Airplay (TopHit)	2
Iceland (Tónlistinn)	25
Latvia Streaming (LaIPA)	1
Lithuania (AGATA)	4
Lithuania Airplay (TopHit)	100
New Zealand (Recorded Music NZ)	1
Norway (VG-lista)	40
Poland (Polish Airplay Top 100)	26
Poland (Polish Streaming Top 100)	17
Slovakia Singles Digital (ČNS IFPI)	30

=== Monthly charts ===
Monthly chart performance for "The Days"
Chart (2025)	Peak position
Lithuania Airplay (TopHit)	62

Monthly chart performance for "The Days" (Notion Remix)
Chart (2025)	Peak position
Czech Republic (Singles Digitál Top 100)	91
Estonia Airplay (TopHit)	4

=== Year-end charts ===
Year-end chart performance for "The Days"
Chart (2025)	Position
Australia (ARIA)	10
Austria (Ö3 Austria Top 40)	25
Belgium (Ultratop 50 Flanders)	70
Canada (Canadian Hot 100)	85
Germany (GfK)	30
Global 200 (Billboard)	116
New Zealand (Recorded Music NZ)	5
Switzerland (Schweizer Hitparade)	78
UK Singles (OCC)	12
US Hot Dance/Electronic Songs (Billboard)	2

Year-end chart performance for "The Days" (Notion Remix)
Chart (2025)	Position
Estonia Airplay (TopHit)	17
Poland (Polish Streaming Top 100)	38
Sweden (Sverigetopplistan)	90

== Certifications ==
Certifications for "The Days"
Region	Certification	Certified units/sales
Australia (ARIA) Notion remix	5× Platinum	350,000^{‡}
Belgium (BRMA)	Gold	20,000^{‡}
France (SNEP)	Gold	100,000^{‡}
Germany (BVMI)	Gold	300,000^{‡}
New Zealand (RMNZ) Notion remix	4× Platinum	120,000^{‡}
Poland (ZPAV) Notion remix	Platinum	125,000^{‡}
United Kingdom (BPI)	2× Platinum	1,200,000^{‡}
United States (RIAA)	Platinum	1,000,000^{‡}
^{‡} Sales+streaming figures based on certification alone.
