= Elizabeth Taylor (song) =

2026 single by Taylor Swift

Single by Taylor Swift

from the album The Life of a Showgirl
- Released: March 9, 2026
- Studio: MXM; Shellback (Stockholm)
- Genre: Orchestral pop; synth-pop
- Length: 3:28
- Label: Republic
- Songwriters: Taylor Swift; Max Martin; Shellback
- Producers: Taylor Swift; Max Martin; Shellback

Taylor Swift singles chronology
"Opalite" (2026)	"Elizabeth Taylor" (2026)	"I Knew It, I Knew You" (2026)

Music video
- "Elizabeth Taylor" on YouTube

"Elizabeth Taylor" is a song by the American singer-songwriter Taylor Swift from her twelfth studio album, The Life of a Showgirl (2025). The song was written and produced by Swift, Max Martin, and Shellback. An orchestral pop and synth-pop ballad, "Elizabeth Taylor" is composed of heavy snare drums, bass, and piano, supported by electronic beats and orchestral arrangements. It is titled after and inspired by the British and American actress Elizabeth Taylor, whom Swift described as a "quintessential" showgirl, and the lyrics deal with the consequences of fame on one's love life.

Most music critics praised the production and lyricism of "Elizabeth Taylor", considering it the centerpiece of The Life of a Showgirl, while others regarded it as unremarkable. Upon the album's release, "Elizabeth Taylor" reached number three on the Billboard Global 200 and the national charts of Australia, Austria, Canada, Ireland, Luxembourg, New Zealand, Portugal, Sweden, Switzerland, the United Kingdom, and the United States. The song has been certified double platinum in Brazil, and platinum in Australia, Canada, and New Zealand.

"Elizabeth Taylor" was released to US radio on March 9, 2026, as the third single from The Life of a Showgirl. The song's music video was released on Apple Music and Spotify Premium on March 31, to coincide with the end of Women's History Month. It features footage from Taylor's films alongside archival newsreels documenting her public appearances and encounters with paparazzi. A 7-inch vinyl of "Elizabeth Taylor" was released on April 18, as part of the 2026 Record Store Day.

== Background and release ==
The American singer-songwriter Taylor Swift created her twelfth studio album, The Life of a Showgirl, to reflect on her triumphant state of mind amidst the success of the Eras Tour and her relationship with the football player Travis Kelce in 2024. She recorded the album with the producers Max Martin and Shellback in Sweden during May–August 2024, in between the European stops of the Eras Tour. Swift announced the album during the August 13, 2025, episode of Travis and Jason Kelce's podcast New Heights; "Elizabeth Taylor" was revealed as the second track.

The album was released on October 3, 2025, through Republic Records. "Elizabeth Taylor" was released to US hot adult contemporary radio on March 9, 2026, and to contemporary hit radio the next day as a radio single. It was the album's third single, following the US Billboard Hot 100 number ones "The Fate of Ophelia" and "Opalite". A digital package featuring the original version, the "So Glamorous Cabaret Version", track commentary, and the accompanying music video was released on March 31. A 7-inch vinyl of the song, with the "So Glamorous Cabaret Version" as the B-side, was released on April 18, as part of Record Store Day.

== Composition ==
=== Music ===
"Elizabeth Taylor"
"Elizabeth Taylor" is a synth-pop ballad that uses heavy snare drums, electronic beats, and orchestral instruments of piano and programmed strings.

At 3 minutes and 28 seconds long, "Elizabeth Taylor" is a ballad that incorporates orchestral pop and synth-pop. Its instrumental composition uses heavy snare drums, bass, piano, programmed strings, and orchestration, as well as electronic beats reminiscent of the sonics of Swift's 2017 album Reputation. The refrain is accompanied by a beat drop.

Critics described the sound and theme of "Elizabeth Taylor" as dramatic or cinematic. The Independent's Roisin O'Connor compared the "stomping flourish of the piano" to the soundtrack for Succession, a black comedy-drama television series. Billboard's Jason Lipshutz commented that the vocal harmonies and instrumentation evoke the sound of the Reputation track "Don't Blame Me" (2017).

=== Lyrics ===
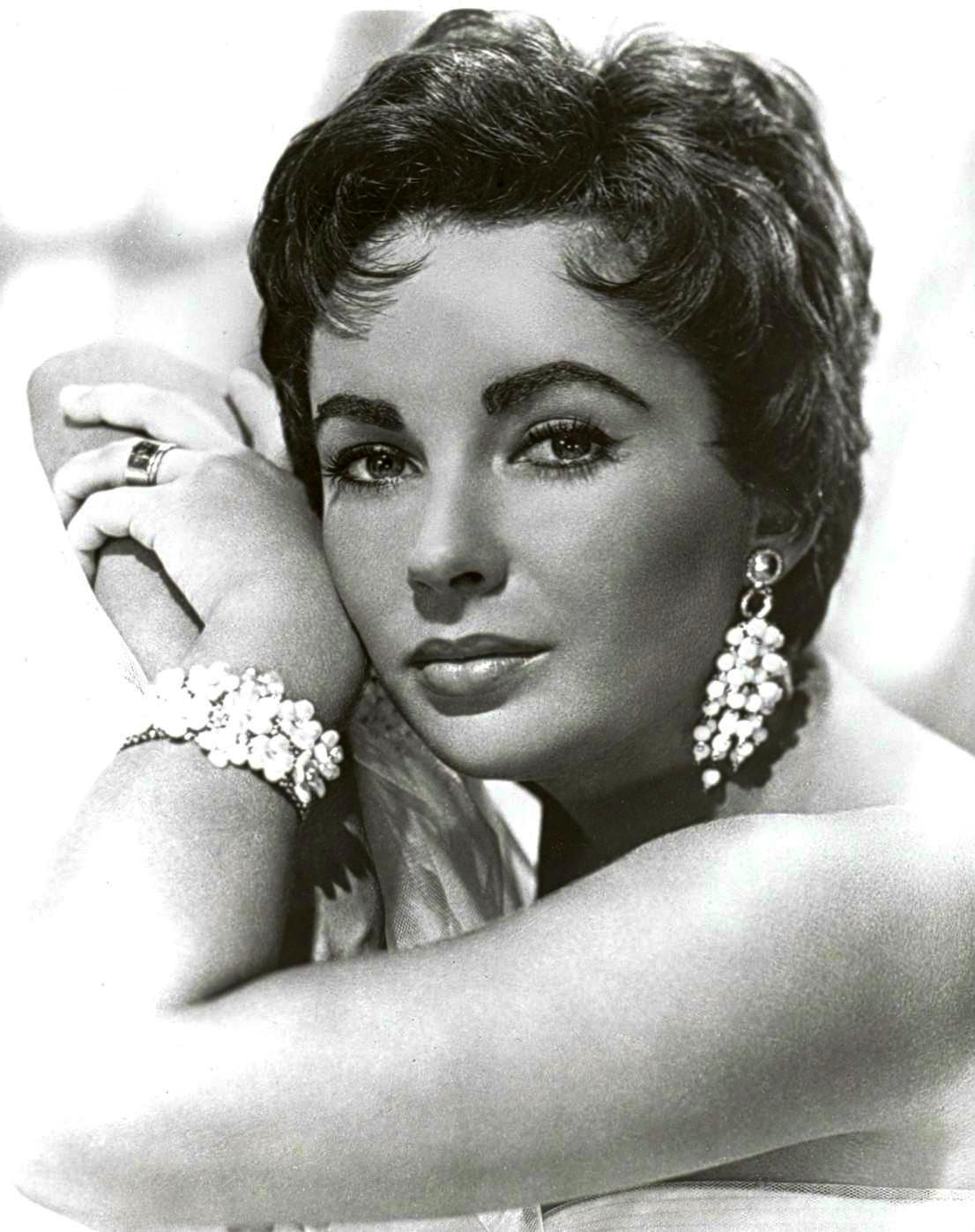
Elizabeth Taylor, the song's namesake

The song is titled after the British and American actress Elizabeth Taylor, whom Swift described as "one of the most ultimate, quintessential showgirls". Previously, Swift had been influenced by Taylor: she visually channeled her style in the music video for "Wildest Dreams" (2015), and lyrically referenced her in the 2017 single "...Ready for It?", which compared Swift's romance to that between Taylor and the Welsh actor Richard Burton.

"Elizabeth Taylor" was the first song that Swift wrote for The Life of a Showgirl. According to Swift, she had a "sudden burst of inspiration" and recorded a draft demo of her singing the refrain on piano, using her smartphone. She sent the demo to Martin and Shellback. The three completed the album's final version. In an interview with Pandora, Swift said that she decided to write a song inspired by Taylor after watching an online video in which Taylor's son said that if he were to choose a person to compare his mother with in terms of popularity and "chaos", it would be Swift. In Z100's radio program Elvis Duran and the Morning Show, Swift stated that she related to Taylor's "polarizing" cultural reception, and that the song is "sort of my emotions and my issues with fame through the lens of cosplaying the life of Elizabeth Taylor, so you kind of meld the two experiences together".

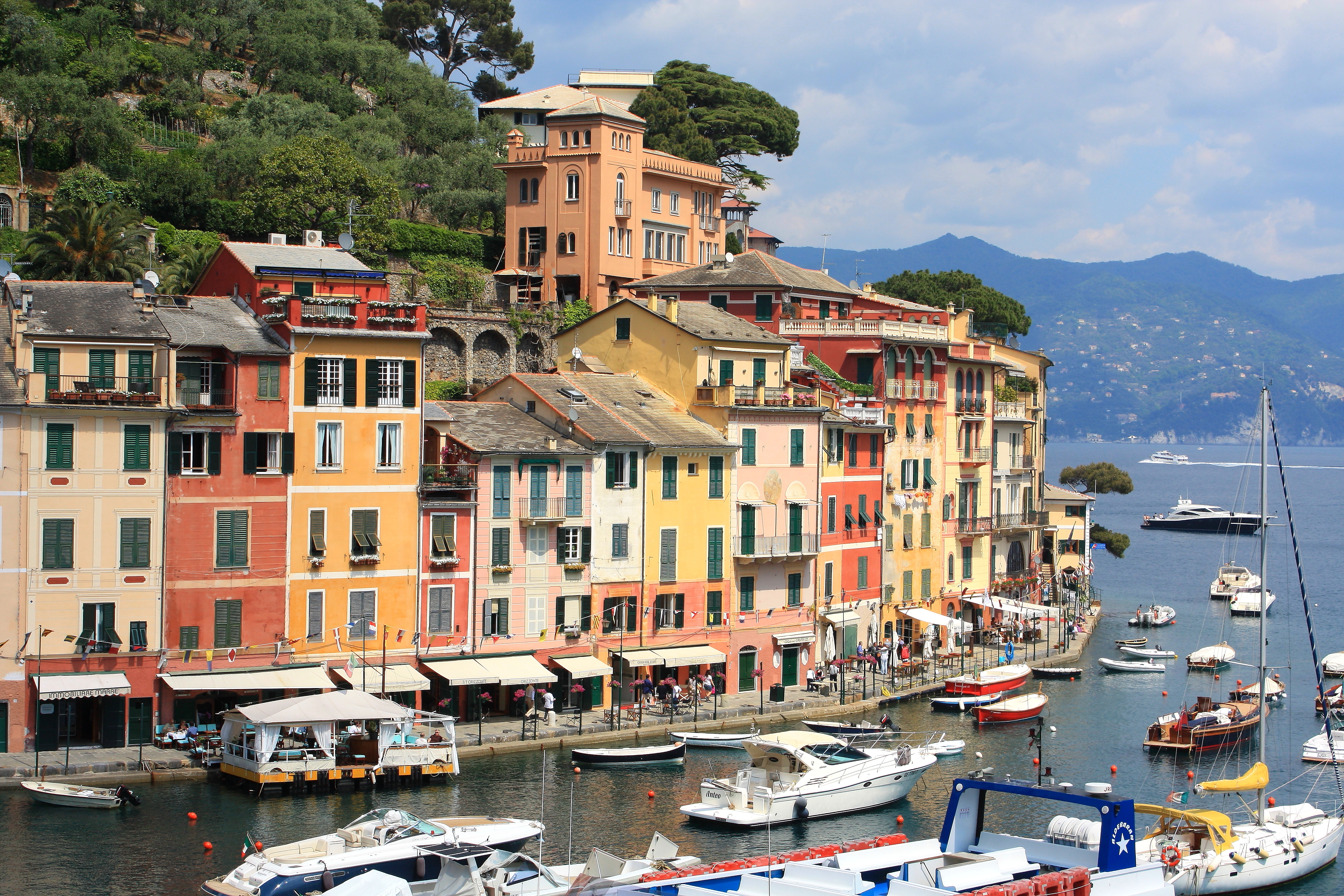
The song references many locations associated with Elizabeth Taylor, including Portofino (pictured), a resort village on the Italian Riviera where she frequently vacationed.

The lyrics of "Elizabeth Taylor" find Swift crooning about how fame and public perception affect personal relationships. Swift includes numerous references to the actress; the verses mention "Plaza Athénée"—either the New York luxury hotel, where Taylor had a duplex penthouse, or the Paris luxury hotel, where Taylor and Burton lived for six months; and the Italian resort town Portofino—where Burton proposed to Taylor. The refrain's line, "I cry my eyes violet", references the public perception that Taylor's eyes were a shade of violet. Later, she references Taylor's branded fragrance White Diamonds: "All my white diamonds and lovers are forever." Swift references Taylor's multiple marriages with the line "All the right guys promised they'd stay", and Taylor's famous jewelry collection with "I would trade the Cartier for someone to trust". She also mentions Musso & Frank Grill, a Los Angeles restaurant that has been serving celebrities since 1919, and one that Taylor frequented.

In the song, Swift draws parallels between her life and Taylor's as two famous women receiving heavy media gossip for their tumultuous love lives. She expresses anxiety and self-doubt about her status ("Oftentimes it doesn't feel so glamorous to be me"; "You're only as hot as your last hit, baby"). Although she has always been "number one", she was convinced that most men could not deal with her enormous success until she found the one. Towards the end, she hopes that this romance will last forever, but concludes that even if it does not, she will still end up a wealthy and glamorous woman.

== Critical reception ==
Reviews praised the production and lyricism of "Elizabeth Taylor". Alexis Petridis of The Guardian dubbed the track as the only one on the album with a "killer chorus". Neil McCormick of The Daily Telegraph selected it as one of the best songs of The Life of a Showgirl, highlighting it as the album's only ballad with an "edge of tension"—the "longing dreamy verses" and the explosive choruses. Similarly, Consequence's Wren Graves opined that the production had an "old-school", earworm quality thanks to the "dramatic keys and grooving bass line". O'Connor lauded Swift's storytelling lyrics and the "magnificent" soundscape.

Many critics regarded "Elizabeth Taylor" as the centerpiece of The Life of a Showgirl. The New Yorker's Amanda Petrusich wrote that it was one of the album's "best and heaviest tracks", opining that the lyrics portrayed both power and insecurity, which served as the central thesis for the album. Rob Sheffield of Rolling Stone similarly considered "Elizabeth Taylor" the emotional centerpiece of The Life of a Showgirl, for depicting a yearning for love and a sense of independence at the same time, and Rachel Leong of Atwood Magazine opined that it had the best songwriting on the album. Business Insider ranked "Elizabeth Taylor" sixth in their list of the 20 best songs of 2025, highlighting the "rich visuals and snappy one-liners" and the "lavish" production. Lipshutz liked the song's "piercing" chorus and "heightened" drama, ranking it seventh in his list.

Some critics were less complimentary. Chris Willman of Variety opined that the song is the album's "closest flirtation" with a "truly big" and "overwhelming" sound. Still, he deemed it the least interesting track due to its "Reputation-but-not-as-good" sound. Stereogum's Tom Breihan also made a similar comparison, saying he disliked lines like "Be my NY when Hollywood hates me", which he believed could be a "lost track from the Reputation sessions". Josh Mercado of ABS-CBN News criticized the sound as "rushed, unseasoned and did not live up to the album's title". Criticizing the lyrics, India Block of The Standard wrote that it was "a bit tone deaf" for Swift to complain about a lack of glamour given her wealth, while Paste's Ellen Johnson picked it as one of the album's worst tracks, saying that it "takes us for a dizzying ride on the diphthong express".

== Commercial performance ==
Upon the release of The Life of a Showgirl, "Elizabeth Taylor" peaked at number three on the Billboard Global 200 and on the charts in Australia, Austria, Canada, Ireland, Luxembourg, New Zealand, Portugal, Sweden, Switzerland, and the United Kingdom. It also peaked at number four in Denmark, Germany, Norway, the Philippines, and Singapore. The single has been certified double platinum in Brazil, and platinum in Australia, Canada, and New Zealand.

In the United States, all 12 songs from The Life of a Showgirl debuted on the Billboard Hot 100, occupying the top 12 spots; "Elizabeth Taylor" debuted and peaked at number three. Following its single release, the song reached the top 10 on Adult Pop Airplay, marking Swift's record-extending 35th top-10 single on the chart. Swift also became the first artist to have three songs in the chart's top 10 simultaneously, with "Opalite", "The Fate of Ophelia", and "Elizabeth Taylor" at numbers 8, 9, and 10, respectively. In July 2026, Swift became the first artist to claim four entries in the top 10 in a single week on the Adult Contemporary Airplay chart, excluding seasonal music, with "The Fate of Ophelia", "Opalite", "I Knew It, I Knew You", and "Elizabeth Taylor" at numbers 7, 8, 9, and 10, respectively.

== Music video ==
The music video for "Elizabeth Taylor" was released on Apple Music and Spotify Premium on March 31, 2026, to coincide with the end of Women's History Month, and it was subsequently released on YouTube two days later. It features footage from Taylor's films alongside archival newsreels documenting her public appearances and encounters with paparazzi. The video is intercut with close-up shots of Taylor's violet eyes and diamond jewelry. The films featured in the video include Julia Misbehaves (1948), Father of the Bride (1950), A Place in the Sun (1951), Love Is Better Than Ever (1952), Rhapsody (1954), Elephant Walk (1954), Giant (1956), Cat on a Hot Tin Roof (1958), Suddenly, Last Summer (1959), Cleopatra (1963), Who's Afraid of Virginia Woolf? (1966), and Boom! (1968). The BBC News reported that Swift obtained permission from Taylor's estate to use her likeness in the video, and that streaming royalties would be directed to the estate and the Elizabeth Taylor AIDS Foundation. Fran Hoepfner of Vulture described the video as underwhelming, writing that it lacked "the drama and narrative" of Swift's previous videos and was "functionally a fan cam" of Elizabeth Taylor.

== Accolades ==
Accolades received by "Elizabeth Taylor"
Organization	Year (Note: Indicates the year of ceremony. Each year is linked to the article about the awards held that year, wherever possible.)	Category	Result	Ref(s).
American Music Awards	2026	Song of the Summer	Nominated	

== In popular culture ==
Critics have highlighted the various life and career parallels between Swift and Taylor. Both share a name, entered the industry as children, found immense success and popularity, and met with criticism that has been subsequently polarizing and even sexist regarding their personal lives.

Taylor's son Christopher Wilding expressed heartfelt admiration for the song, saying he listened to it on the day it was released. He described the song as "especially magical", noting that Swift's detailed references to his mother's legacy resonated deeply with him. Wilding emphasized the parallels between Swift and his mother, saying, "They are both the very embodiment of female empowerment." He further remarked that if the song brings renewed respect to his mother's name, he considers that a positive outcome. Wilding praised Swift as a "rare, positive role model for young girls", highlighting her philanthropic efforts and advocacy for LGBTQ+ rights, which he believes would have earned his mother's admiration.

== Personnel ==
Credits are adapted from the album's liner notes.

Studios

- Produced at MXM Studios and Shellback Studios, Stockholm
- Recorded at Shellback Studios, Stockholm
- Strings and harp recorded and engineered at Studio 112, Jonstorp, Sweden
- Mixed at MixStar Studios, Virginia Beach
- Mastered at Sterling Sound, Edgewater, New Jersey

Personnel

- Taylor Swift – lead vocals, songwriting, production
- Max Martin – production, songwriting, programming, keyboards, piano, string arrangements, recording
- Shellback – production, songwriting, programming, bass, drums, guitar, Omnichord, percussion, recording
- Erik Arvinder – violin
- Matthias Johansson – violin
- Hanna Helgegren – violin
- David Bukovinsky – cello
- Helena Stjernstrom – harp
- Mattias Bylund – string synthesizer, strings arrangement, recording, engineering
- Lasse Mårtén – recording, engineering
- Serban Ghenea – mixing
- Bryce Bordone – assistant mixing
- Randy Merrill – mastering

== Charts ==
=== Weekly charts ===
Weekly chart performance
Chart (2025–2026)	Peak position
Argentina Hot 100 (Billboard)	24
Australia (ARIA)	3
Austria (Ö3 Austria Top 40)	3
Belgium (Ultratop 50 Flanders)	20
Belgium (Ultratop 50 Wallonia)	48
Brazil Hot 100 (Billboard)	23
Canada Hot 100 (Billboard)	3
Canada AC (Billboard)	21
Canada CHR/Top 40 (Billboard)	13
Canada Hot AC (Billboard)	18
Croatia (Billboard)	11
Croatian International Albums (HDU) 7-inch vinyl	1
Czech Republic Singles Digital (ČNS IFPI)	7
Denmark (Tracklisten)	4
Estonia Airplay (TopHit)	12
Finland (Suomen virallinen lista)	13
Finland Airplay (Radiosoittolista)	11
France (SNEP)	21
Germany (GfK)	4
Global 200 (Billboard)	3
Greece International (IFPI)	2
Hong Kong (Billboard)	11
Hungary (Single Top 40)	19
India International (IMI)	4
Ireland (IRMA)	3
Israel (Mako Hitlist)	44
Italy (FIMI)	32
Latvia Streaming (LaIPA)	2
Lithuania (AGATA)	8
Luxembourg (Billboard)	3
Malaysia (IFPI)	11
Malaysia International (RIM)	7
Malta Airplay (Radiomonitor)	20
Middle East and North Africa (IFPI)	12
Netherlands (Dutch Top 40)	29
Netherlands (Single Top 100)	7
New Zealand (Recorded Music NZ)	3
Norway (VG-lista)	4
Philippines (Philippines Hot 100)	4
Poland (Polish Airplay Top 100)	58
Poland (Polish Streaming Top 100)	14
Portugal (AFP)	3
Saudi Arabia (IFPI)	18
Singapore (RIAS)	4
Slovakia Airplay (ČNS IFPI)	21
Slovakia Singles Digital (ČNS IFPI)	12
South Africa Streaming (TOSAC)	19
Spain (Promusicae)	16
Sweden (Sverigetopplistan)	3
Switzerland (Schweizer Hitparade)	3
Switzerland Airplay (MusicTrace)	2
Taiwan (Billboard)	13
United Arab Emirates (IFPI)	5
UK Singles (Official Charts)	3
US Billboard Hot 100	3
US Adult Contemporary (Billboard)	9
US Adult Pop Airplay (Billboard)	8
US Pop Airplay (Billboard)	7
Venezuela Anglo Airplay (Monitor Latino)	12
Vietnam (IFPI)	13

=== Monthly charts ===
Monthly chart performance
Chart (2025–2026)	Peak position
Croatian International Vinyl Albums (HDU) 7-inch vinyl	3
Estonia Airplay (TopHit)	16
Lithuania Airplay (TopHit)	63

== Certifications ==
Certifications
Region	Certification	Certified units/sales
Australia (ARIA)	Platinum	70,000^{‡}
Belgium (BRMA)	Gold	20,000^{‡}
Brazil (Pro-Música Brasil)	2× Platinum	80,000^{‡}
Canada (Music Canada)	Platinum	80,000^{‡}
France (SNEP)	Gold	100,000^{‡}
New Zealand (RMNZ)	Platinum	30,000^{‡}
United Kingdom (BPI)	Gold	400,000^{‡}
^{‡} Sales+streaming figures based on certification alone.

== Release history ==
Release formats and dates for "Elizabeth Taylor"
Region	Date	Format	Version	Label	Ref.
United States	March 9, 2026	Hot adult contemporary radio	Original	Republic	
United States	March 10, 2026	Contemporary hit radio	Original	Republic	
Various	March 31, 2026	Streaming	Original; acoustic	Republic	
Various	April 18, 2026	7-inch vinyl	Original; acoustic	Republic	
Italy	April 24, 2026	Radio airplay	Original	Island	
