= Chrystal (musician) =

British singer, songwriter and record producer

- Born: Chrystal Jade Ruby Opal Orchard; 1988 or 1989 (age 37–38)
- Origin: Bolton, Greater Manchester, England
- Genres: Pop, House, UK garage, R&B
- Instruments: Keyboards; vocals
- Years active: 2015–present
- Website: www.chrystalmusic.com

Chrystal Jade Ruby Opal Orchard (born 1988–1989), known professionally as Chrystal, is a British singer, songwriter and record producer from Farnworth in Greater Manchester.

Her 2017 single "Waves" attracted attention from BBC Radio 1Xtra and The Sunday Times and garnered comparison to Lily Allen and Katy B. She then released the tracks "New Shoes", "2 Real", and "Vibe". In January 2025, her song "The Days" charted on several singles charts, while in July 2025, her collaboration with MK on "Dior" charted at number-one on the UK singles chart.

== Life and career ==
Chrystal Jade Ruby Opal Orchard (Note: For her surname, see.; For the rest of her name, see) is from Farnworth in Greater Manchester and was born in 1988 or 1989. Growing up, she was an ardent fan of R&B, hip hop, UK garage, and the Vengaboys. She suffered from major depression and suicidal thoughts when she was fifteen and had a daughter in her late teens. Aged 22, she was studying law at the University of Bolton, but dropped out and transferred to Manchester Creative And Media Academy, at which she read music and music production. In 2015, she was regularly attending and performing at raves with her sister. She began uploading Bolton-based videos, which brought her to the attention of the independent label 37 Records, who signed her.

In 2017, she released "Waves", a track inspired by the donk she was exposed to whilst clubbing as a teenager. She was originally going to release the track the year before but its release was delayed after 37 signed her. BBC Radio 1Xtra declared the track its Weekend Anthem, while Beats 1 declared it its World Record and The Sunday Times listed it as one of its "hottest tracks". Matthew Whitehouse of i-D magazine described the track as "a bold and funny debut about not giving a fuck" that "bounds out the blocks with stacks of attitude and contains the best opening line we've heard all year ("I'm from B-O-L-T-O-N, I write a million lines and go through bare biro pens")".

Orchard then released "New Shoes" in November 2017, a track about her life experiences produced by 169, followed by "2 Real" in February 2018, a track mastered by Mandy Parnell. The latter track was accompanied by a video co-produced by Harry Lindley of SB.TV, which featured her sister and cousin and was variously filmed in her house, Bridgewater Mill, the arches near Bolton Town Hall, and Moses Gate Country Park. That November, she released "Vibe", which featured a verse from Virginia-based rapper Rozwell Fitzroy.

"[Disclosure's] music was just so fresh [in 2013], when I first heard White Noise, I felt like I'd never heard anything like that before. I loved Timbaland as a producer growing up, I was obsessed with his choice of sounds and samples & artists like Missy Elliott, Aaliyah. All the 90s/00s RnB & producers really. UK garage & bassline too and being from Bolton I was very heavily influenced by bounce music as a teenager, CDs of live sets always got passed around and copied from clubs like Wigan Pier, Cricketers, Maximes. And Max Martin is probably one of if not my favourite producer and songwriter of all time."

— Chrystal in January 2025

In 2024, her single "The Days" entered the UK Singles Chart, peaking at number 4 in January 2025; around the same time, the track entered the Canadian Hot 100 at No. 95, bolstered by its use in a video by Jaxon's Journey and by a remix by Bristol-based producer Notion, and that remix charted at No. 7 on the ARIA Singles Chart. The remix was certified 5× Platinum by the Australian Recording Industry Association (ARIA) in 2026. A dance music track, "The Days" was written in 2015 and had been part of an album called Unarchived 2015, the second of three Unarchived albums she released that year. At the time, she had retired as an artist. In a November 2024 slideshow uploaded to TikTok, she stated that she changed from making house and garage music to R&B and alternative pop in time for her record deal, that she had left the deal by 2019 and spent time working as an engineer before moving into a small recording studio in Manchester in January 2024, and that her Unarchived series comprised tracks recorded between 2014 and 2016.

By January, she had signed to Chaos Recordings. In July, her MK collaboration "Dior" charted at number-one on the UK singles chart, and has since been certified platinum in the United Kingdom by the British Phonographic Industry (BPI) and gold in Australia by ARIA. A further feature, on Sonny Fodera's "My Loving", followed in February 2026.

== Artistry ==
Many of her early tracks including "Waves", "2 Real", and "Vibe" were produced by John Calvert. Aaron Powell of The Line of Best Fit described "Waves" as having "nods to early Lily Allen and Katy B", while Whitehouse opined that her music contained "bouncy shades" of Blackout Crew and wrote that she was "garnering comparisons to Lily Allen, Katy B and Ray BLK", artists who he described as "document[ing] their worlds with varying shades of inbuilt London bullshit detectors". Reviewing "2 Real", Anna Cafolla of The Quietus wrote that Chrystal sung with a "distinctly Northern, very cool delivery" and that the track was in "the vein of attitude-packed pop like contemporaries Mabel and Ray BLK and assertive sunny R&B by way of TLC". George Griffiths of The Official Charts Company wrote that he could hear Disclosure's Settle as an influence.

== Discography ==
=== Albums ===
- Dance Again (2023)

=== Singles ===
- "Silver Moonlight" (2015)
- "Waves" (2017)
- "If You Know" (2023)
- "Artumi" (2023)
- "On a Regular" (2023)
- "The Days" (2024)
- "Dior" (with MK) (2025)
- "My Loving" (with Sonny Fodera) (2026)
- "Outta My Mind (Touch)" (2026)
