= Brisbane Grammar School =

Location
- Spring Hill, Queensland; Australia; 27°27′33″S 153°1′0″E

Information
- Type: Independent, day & boarding
- Motto: Latin: Nil Sine Labore (Nothing Without Labour)
- Denomination: Non-denominational
- Established: 1868
- Employees: ~120
- Grades: 5–12
- Gender: Boys
- Enrolment: ~2,100 (As of 2026)
- Colours: Sporting: Oxford Blue and Cambridge Blue Academic: red and gold
- Alumni: BSG Old Boys
- Website: www.brisbanegrammar.com

Brisbane Grammar School (BGS) is an independent, fee charging, non-denominational, day and boarding school for boys in Spring Hill, Brisbane, Queensland, Australia. It is the second oldest secondary school in Queensland. Some of the Brisbane Grammar School Buildings are listed on the Queensland Heritage Register.

Established in 1868 under the Grammar Schools Act that was passed by the Government of Queensland in 1860, the school has a non-selective enrolment policy and currently caters for approximately 1500 students from Years 5 to 12, including around 100 boarders.

Brisbane Grammar School is affiliated with the Australian Boarding Schools Association (ABSA), the Association of Heads of Independent Schools of Australia (AHISA), Independent Schools Queensland (ISQ), and is a founding member of the Great Public Schools' Association Inc (GPS).

== History ==
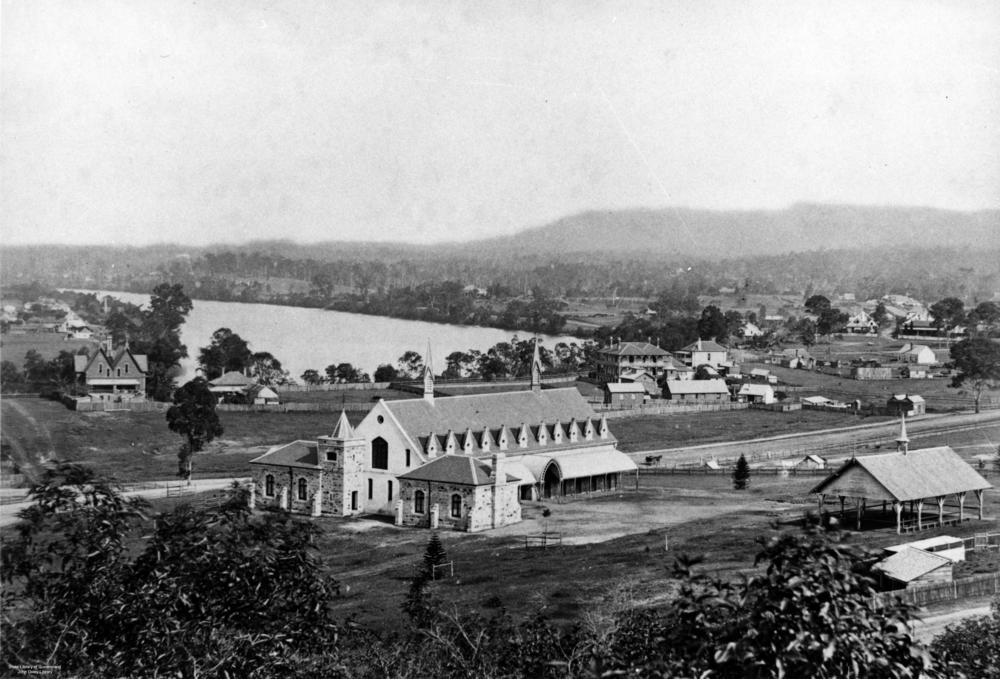
First Brisbane Grammar School, Roma St, c. 1874

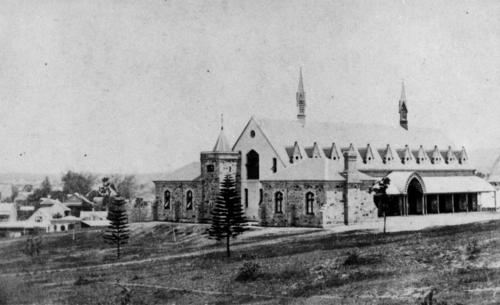
The original Brisbane Grammar School, in Roma, Street, c. 1875

Brisbane Grammar School was founded in 1868 under the Grammar Schools Act, which had been passed by the Queensland Government in 1860. It was the second school established under this act in Queensland, with the first being Ipswich Grammar School.

The original school, designed by Benjamin Backhouse, was on a site in Roma Street in Brisbane City, approximately opposite modern Herschel Street. The foundation stone was laid at the site on 21 February 1868. The school opened in February 1869, with ninety-four students and four masters, under the leadership of headmaster Thomas Harlin. In 1881, the school was moved a few hundred metres away to its current site on Gregory Terrace in Spring Hill to make way for Roma Street railway station to become a junction station.

Following the opening of the boarding house in 1886, science laboratories were constructed in 1912.

On 14 August 1916, the Queensland Governor, Sir Hamilton Goold-Adams unveiled a war memorial with the names of 600 students who had enlisted. In 1921, Brigadier General Lachlan Chisholm Wilson, a former pupil, presented a field gun to the school, an Austrian-made 10.4 cm Feldkanone M. 15, which had been taken from the Ottoman Army by the Australian Light Horse at the Capture of Jenin in 1918.

A new library and assembly hall were constructed in 1969 as a celebration of the school's centenary.

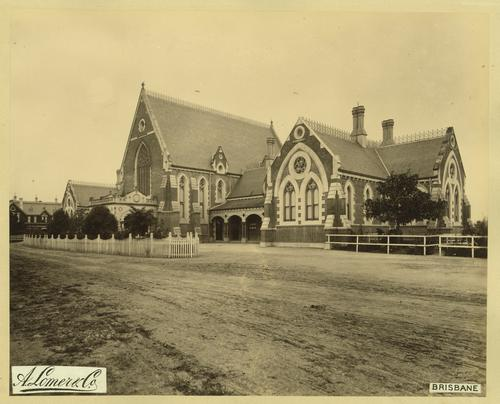
The new school on Gregory Terrace, 1889

During the mid-1990s, the school commenced work on the off-campus Northgate ovals, which now consist of six fields that are used for cricket, rugby union and soccer fixtures. The Indoor Sports Centre was completed in 2000, and the old gymnasium was later renovated to become the new Centre for Art.

In 2002, the school underwent a major redevelopment with the construction of a new middle school, which had its first intake of grade 6 and 7 students in 2003. This middle school consists of a large block of multi-purpose classrooms, functioning as a complete school in itself, with its own teachers and independent timetables. Grade 6 and 7 students spend most of their time in the middle school, although they do use the facilities of the "Upper School" for such activities as physical education and assemblies. In 2014, Year 5 was added to the middle school with 100 new students enrolled.

== Extracurricular activities ==
=== Cultural activities ===
Students are able to participate in a wide range of musical groups, established by former directors of music, John Broughton, and Bruce May, including two orchestras, seven concert bands, four stage bands, eight string ensembles, six choirs, and an array of other instrumental ensembles, including four percussion ensembles. John Callaghan was the driving force behind establishing most of the bands. Student-led ensembles feature in concerts every year. Furthermore, each year the BGS Music Department performs an event known as the Grammar Community in Concert, typically at the Queensland Conservatorium of Music. This event brings together members from across the BGS Community, including the BGS Community Choir, incorporating parents, teachers, and friends. The school also has a thriving Drama program, largely established by former Drama Master, Brian Cannon, presenting a range of plays and musicals. In addition, opportunities in debating and public speaking are offered, with the school participating in Queensland Debating Union and Greater Public Schools annual competitions. Additionally, Brisbane Grammar School has recently revamped its participation in enterprise education groups. With the newly reformed Economics and Enterprise Club, students are gaining exciting experiences through external competitions such as YAA, Ecoman and ABW. An array of other special-interest groups exist, including those which focus on Chess, Astronomy, Aviation, Christianity, Environmental aid, and Community Service.

=== Sport ===
The school offers a range of mainstream sporting activities, including cross country, track and field, rugby, football, basketball, tennis, cricket, gymnastics, debating, swimming, rowing, sailing, chess and volleyball within the GPS association of schools, as well as many others such as water polo, fencing and tae kwon-do.

=== GPS membership ===
Brisbane Grammar School is a member of the Great Public Schools Association of Queensland Inc. (GPS).

in the early stages of GPS when competition with earlier established Ipswich Grammar began, Australian rules football was the chosen code. The first competitive match between the two schools was played in 1870 under these rules – the outcome was a draw. These early games were exceptionally long – the match between IGS and Brisbane Grammar in 1876 commenced at 10.30am and ended at 2.30pm, at which time IGS had scored 6 goals to Brisbane Grammar's nil. The first tennis match between Ipswich Grammar School (IGS) and Brisbane Grammar School took place in 1893, with IGS emerging victorious. IGS also triumphed in the inaugural cricket match between the two schools, although the exact scores have been lost to history.

The school's membership enables its students to participate in sporting competitions as well as engage in endeavours such as Debating and musical events. Most competitions are played out on Saturdays at any of the schools' sporting facilities. The main campus comprises four playing fields in addition to eight tennis courts. Many fixtures, including Cricket, Rugby and Football, are conducted at the Northgate Campus. Sailing is run on Sundays at RQYS, Manly, and the GPS championship is held at the end of the season.

== Campuses and facilities ==
=== Indoor sports centre ===
The Indoor Sports Centre was officially opened by the Governor of Queensland, Major General Peter Arnison on 3 March 2000. The centre, which is situated on the main campus, is home to a multi-purpose double basketball court sports hall (which can also accommodate three volleyball courts, six badminton courts, 12 fencing pistes as well as futsal), an aquatic centre with a 10-lane, 25m heated swimming pool, a gymnasium featuring a deep foam pit, parallel bars and rings and a spectator area with seating for 150 people during sporting events, an indoor cricket net, as well as a weights room and theory rooms and amenities. This sports centre has hosted local and international sporting teams, such as the Queensland Reds, Australia national rugby union team, Brisbane Broncos, New Zealand national rugby union team, Australia national cricket team, United States swimming squad and the England national rugby union team.

=== Northgate Playing Fields ===
Work commenced on the Northgate Playing Fields in the mid-1990s, which now have six ovals, accommodating Cricket, Rugby union, Soccer and Australian Rules Football fixtures. The fields are also used during the school week, especially for winter activities training sessions. Canteen facilities are provided on game days. Adjacent to the main oval is a small stadium which caters for seating for one half of the field, which also contains a dining area. The playing fields were used by the Australian Cricket Team prior to the 2006/2007 Ashes campaign, where they trained with the school's First XI.

=== BGS Tennis Centre ===
The Tennis Centre, adjacent to the school grounds, is the location of tennis courts, a carpark, and a private balcony and small grandstand. Students visit this facility for PE lessons as well as sports training sessions. It is separated from the main campus by a public footbridge, which has been recently closed by Queensland Rail. Access is now available via a long walk from the Indoor Sports Centre, or via the Victoria Park side of the site.

=== Auditoriums and theatres ===
The school has 6 major auditoriums and a theatre: The Centenary Hall, The Great Hall, The Lilley Centre Forum, The Music Auditorium, The Amphitheatre, The Gallery and The Theatre.

Centenary Hall accommodates the entire senior school (9–12) student body for weekly assemblies, when The Gallery above is opened up to the Hall. The hall is also used for other events such as breakfasts, music concerts, debates and year-level tests. The Gallery above the hall can accommodate 2-year groups for lectures and information sessions.

The Great Hall is one of the school's most historic buildings. The walls have various honour-boards commemorating academic, sporting and cultural achievements, as well as honouring the names of those who have served in wars. The stage is overlooked by a 10*3-metre stained glass window, with Queen Victoria and her knights of the realm as a central feature. The hall provides venue for Form Year Assemblies, Public speaking, debating and music performances. It is also used for dinner parties (such as the Old-Boys Association's reunions or the Mothers of Past Student gatherings) and weddings for old-boys.

The Forum can seat around 150–200 people and is used for collaborative learning exercises, usually housing all students in a subject or 3–4 classes. When using the extra seating available, a whole 250 student cohort can be housed.

The Music Auditorium, established during the tenure of Bruce May as director of music, is a venue used to highlight the school's large music program. During the year a varied program of choral, concert and stage band and orchestral concerts take place. Many groups rehearse here weekly. Percussion equipment is able to fit in the hall.

The Drama Theatre, established under the tenure of Brian Cannon as drama master, can seat approximately 300 for theatrical productions. The school holds a junior school play, a senior school play and a middle school production (play or musical) every year. It is equipped with sound and lighting equipment, including audio and lighting boards operated by students, a green room, and technical storage space. The Centenary Hall for many years was the venue for theatre productions under director, Brian Cannon.

=== Moogerah Outdoor Education Centre ===
Brisbane Grammar School's off-campus centre at Pepperina Hill, near Lake Moogerah, was opened in 1976 and is named the Moogerah Outdoor Education Centre (colloquially referred to as Moogerah). The school sends each form class from grades 8, 9 and 10 out to the campus to strengthen intra-class relationships and morale, as well as develop team-working and leadership skills. Year 11 outdoor education leaders also attend the camp to build the relationship between the senior, and younger students. The five-day programme includes such activities as rock-climbing, bushwalking, orienteering, canoeing, and a camp-out in the bush at the foot of a mountain. Year 5, 6 and 7 students also visit the campsite, but for a shorter duration – one, two and three days respectively.

The centre is also used for various other school activities: Writer's Camps, Composers' Camps, Scientist-In-Residence Camps, sport training, FFG (Faith Fellowship Group) Christian Camps, Astronomy & sky viewings and fieldwork in senior courses. The rowers utilise the camp's boatshed on the lake's edge for training.

=== The Lilley Centre ===
The Lilley Centre is a centre located on the College Road side of the main campus (named after Premier and chairman of the Board of Trustees Sir Charles Lilley), and houses several classrooms equipped with learning technologies, a library, a lecture theatre (called 'The Forum') and a seniors' study room. The centre was officially opened on 26 February 2010 by former Premier of Queensland, Anna Bligh.

=== STEAM precinct ===
In 2024, the BGS STEAM precinct was officially opened. It combines the disciplines of Science, Technology, Engineering, Arts and Mathematics. It is located on the main campus, near the Indoor Sports Centre.

== Recent incidents ==
=== Pedophile compensation controversy ===
In 2003, the school was involved in controversy when it attempted to recover damages from its insurer following students' claims that they had been sexually abused by Kevin Lynch, school counsellor between the 1976 and 1988.

Some 70 former students sued the school, alleging Lynch sexually abused them during counselling sessions. Rejecting out-of-court settlements, some of the victims claimed compensation in the Supreme Court of Queensland. Two former students had allegedly lodged complaints about Lynch's conduct with then headmaster of the school, Maxwell Howell, in the early 1980s and the issue was quietly investigated. However, Grammar was unaware the details of the investigation had to be passed on to its insurer. For failing to notify its insurer of the complaints made of Lynch, the school thus became liable for A$1.17 million in legal fees and compensation.

Lynch was charged in January 1997 over the abuses perpetrated at both St Paul's School (where he was subsequently employed) and Brisbane Grammar. Lynch committed suicide on 23 January 1997, the day after being charged.

=== Fumes exposure incident ===
On 14 July 2010, 120 students were exposed to a chemical solvent being used in school construction works. Many of these students had been exposed for less than 20 minutes. 6 ambulance crews were dispatched to the school, where 35 students experienced sore eyes and throats as well as minor breathing difficulties. Of the students affected, 2 were hospitalised.

== Notable alumni ==
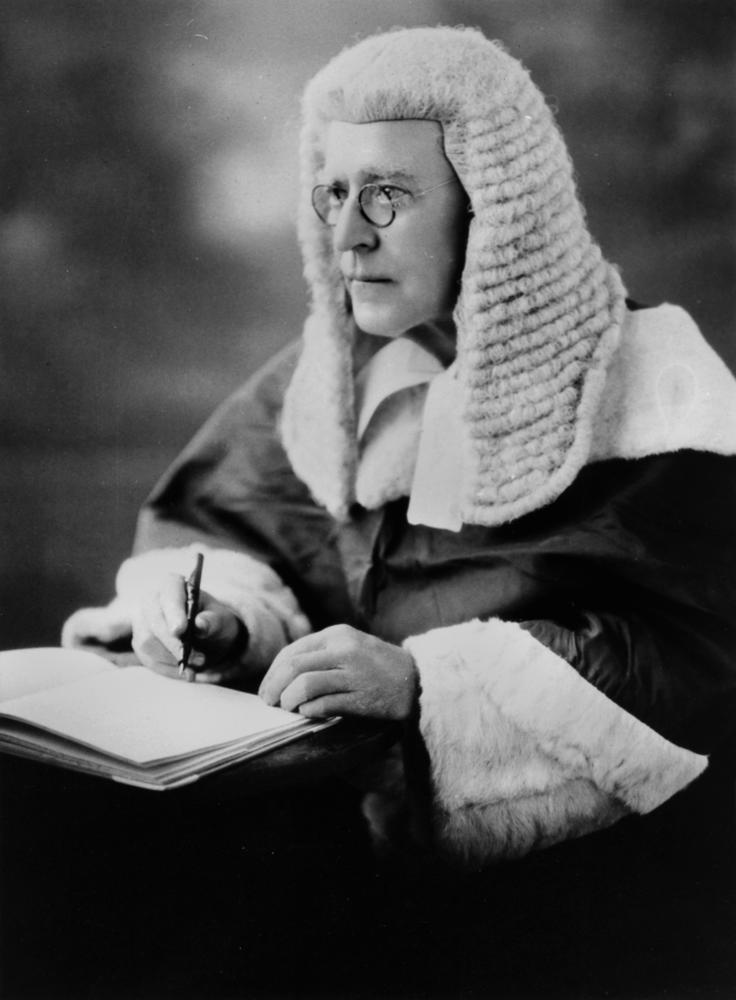
Judge John Laskey Woolcock n.d.

=== Politics ===
==== Australian Parliament ====
- James Bayley — former Member for Oxley in the Australian House of Representatives and member of the Queensland Legislative Assembly
- Sir Donald Charles Cameron — former Member for Brisbane and Lilley in the Australian House of Representatives
- Don Dobie — former Member for Hughes and Cook in the Australian House of Representatives
- Nigel Drury — former Member for Ryan in the Australian House of Representatives
- Grosvenor Francis — former Member for Kennedy in the Australian House of Representatives
- Sir James Killen — former Minister for Defence and Member for Moreton in the Australian House of Representatives
- Ian Macfarlane — former Liberal National Federal Cabinet Minister and Member for Groom in the Australian House of Representatives
- Kenneth Morris — former Senator for Queensland in the Australian House of Representatives and Deputy Premier of Queensland
- Bill Riordan — former Minister for the Navy and Member for Kennedy in the Australian House of Representatives
- Malcolm Roberts — Senator for Queensland in the Australian House of Representatives

==== Queensland Parliament ====
- Rob Akers — former member of the Queensland Legislative Assembly
- John Appel — former member of the Queensland Legislative Assembly
- Earle Bailey — former member of the Queensland Legislative Assembly
- Joshua Thomas Bell — former Speaker of the Queensland Legislative Assembly
- Tom Burns — former Labor Party National President and Deputy Premier of Queensland
- Thomas Joseph Byrnes — former Premier of Queensland
- Neville Harper — former member of the Queensland Legislative Assembly
- Phil Heath — former member of the Queensland Legislative Assembly
- John Herbert — former member of the Queensland Legislative Assembly
- Thomas Hiley — former Treasurer of Queensland and Deputy Premier of Queensland
- Colin Lamont — former member of the Queensland Legislative Assembly
- Alan Munro — former Attorney-General of Queensland and Deputy Premier of Queensland
- Frederick W. Paterson — former Member of the Queensland Legislative Assembly
- John Scott — former member of the Queensland Legislative Assembly
- Thomas Blacket Stephens — former Treasurer of Queensland and Mayor of Brisbane
- William Stephens — former member of the Queensland Legislative Assembly
- Jim Turnour — former member of the Queensland Legislative Assembly
- Cladius Buchanan Whish — former member of the Queensland Legislative Assembly and sugar-planter

==== Other politicians ====
- Air Vice Marshal Don Bennett — aviation pioneer, bomber pilot and Member of Parliament in the House of Commons in the United Kingdom
- Sir Thomas Reginald Groom — former Mayor of Brisbane
- Drew Hutton — co-founder of the Australian Greens, university lecturer, and social and environmental activist
- Christopher Lethbridge — former member of the New South Wales Legislative Assembly

=== Law and the judiciary ===
- Ian Callinan — Justice of the High Court of Australia
- Sir Charles Powers — Justice of the High Court of Australia
- John Logan — judge of the Federal Court of Australia and president of the Defence Force Discipline Appeal Tribunal
- Max Julius — barrister and communist
- Sir Arnold Lucas Bennett — barrister and president of the Bar Association of Queensland
- Henry George Fryberg — Justice of the Supreme Court of Queensland
- Lionel Lukin — Justice of the Supreme Court of the Australian Capital Territory
- John Laskey Woolcock — Justice of the Supreme Court of Queensland

=== Journalism ===
- Malcolm Farr — Canberra-based political journalist and commentator
- Andrew Olle — ABC and Nine Network journalist (last year of school only)
- Michael Ware — CNN war correspondent and Time magazine journalist
- Spencer Howson — radio presenter
- Robert Macklin — journalist and author
- Ray Moynihan — health journalist, documentary-maker and author

=== Military and public service ===
Public Service

- Lieutenant General Sir John Lavarack — Governor of Queensland
- Sir Charles Spry — Director-General of the Australian Security Intelligence Organisation
- John Douglas Story — public servant
- George Wawrick Smith — public servant
- James Cumes — diplomat
- Ian Carnell — former Inspector-General of Intelligence and Security

Military

- Major General Professor John Pearn — Surgeon General of the Australian Defence Force
- Commander Eric Feldt — head of the Coastwatchers WWII
- Brigadier General Lachlan Chisholm Wilson — commander of the Australian Light Horse in the First World War
- Major General James Harold Cannan
- Major General Walter Adams Coxen
- Brigadier General Cecil Henry Foott
- John Francis Jackson — fighter ace and squadron commander in the Second World War
- Leslie Douglas Jackson — fighter ace
- Lieutenant General Allan Joseph Boase
- Major General Eric Clive Pegus Plant
- Air Marshal Stephen Gareth Chappell

=== Entertainment and the arts ===
- William Baylebridge — writer and poet
- Robert Davidson — composer, artistic director
- Robin Dods — architect
- Robert Forster — musician, singer-songwriter and founder of The Go-Betweens
- Jack Lindsay — Marxist author and poet
- J J Hilder — painter
- Leonard Shillam — sculptor
- David Malouf — author
- Brad Shepherd — musician
- Ian Haug and John Collins — musicians, Powderfinger
- Spencer Howson — radio presenter
- Stephen Vagg — writer, author of All My Friends Are Leaving Brisbane (2007)
- Adam Zwar — actor and creator of award-winning television shows Wilfred and Lowdown
- Christopher Wrench — organist
- Ray Chen — violinist
- Arthur Benjamin — composer, pianist, and conductor
- Leonard Teale — actor
- Ronald McKie — novelist
- Henry George Lamond — writer and farmer
- Philip Neilsen — poet and author
- Robin Dods — architect
- George Landen Dann — playwright
- Francis Richard Hall — architect
- Jang Han-byul — singer, actor, and television personality
- George Pullar — actor
- Alex Wilson , Nick Cavdarski and Jacob Reed — musicians, Shag Rock
- Connor O'Grady — fashion designer

=== Science and academia ===
- Jock R. Anderson — agricultural economist at the World Bank and emeritus professor at the University of New England
- John Graeme Balsillie — inventor, communications engineer, business proprietor who oversaw establishment of Australia's coastal radio network
- Bob Bryan — geologist and businessman
- Alexander Marks — physician and military officer
- Errol Solomon Meyers — Brisbane doctor and one of the founding fathers of the University of Queensland School of Medicine
- Donald Nicklin — chemical engineer and professor
- Richard Powell Francis — educator
- William Fleetwood Sheppard — mathematician, statistician, and civil servant
- Daniel Botsman — Sumitomo Professor of History at Yale University
- Joshua Gans — economics professor
- Leonard Keith Ward — geologist and public servant
- Edward Rennie — scientist and president of the Royal Society of South Australia
- Harding Frew — civil engineer
- Oscar Werner Tiegs — zoologist
- Donald Markwell — social scientist and former Warden of Rhodes House
- Jock R Anderson — agricultural economist
- Neville Thiele — audio engineer
- Harald Jensen — geologist
- Edward Marks — ophthalmologist
- Harrison Bryan — former Director General of the National Library of Australia
- Mark Western - Director of HASS Research Infrastructure at the University of Queensland

=== Business ===
- Tom Strachan — head of AWX
- James Chin Moody — CEO of Sendle
- Sir Ronald Gordon Jackson — businessman
- Kevin Weldon — book publisher and philanthropist

=== Sport ===
==== AFL ====
- Matthew Hammelmann — AFL footballer
- Joel Macdonald — AFL footballer and businessman
- Ray Smith — AFL footballer
- John Williams — AFL footballer

==== Cricket ====
- Ben Cutting — cricket, Queensland Bulls, Australia, Brisbane Heat
- Patrick Dooley
- Ben Dunk — cricket, Queensland Bulls, Hobart Hurricanes, Tasmania Tigers
- Tim Caldwell
- Alec Hurwood — Australian test cricketer
- Kendel Kadowaki Fleming
- Alan Marshal — cricket, Queensland and Surrey County Cricket Club
- Otto Nothling — Australian test cricketer/Rugby Union player
- David Ogilvie — Australian test cricketer
- Sir Charles Powers — Queensland cricket captain
- Matt Renshaw — cricket, Queensland Bulls, Australia
- Pud Thurlow — Australian cricketer

==== Rowing ====
- Samuel Conrad — Australian eight Olympic rower
- Patrick Holt — national representative rower
- Richard Powell — Australian Olympic rower
- Darryn Purcell — Australian rower
- Logan Ullrich — national representative rower
- David Weightman — rower

==== Rugby league ====
- Dajearn Asi
- Hamiso Tabuai-Fidow
- Tom Gilbert

==== Rugby union ====
- Mitchell Chapman — New South Wales Waratahs player
- Julian Gardner — Wallaby & Italy
- Sam Greene
- Rob Lawton — Wallaby prop
- Tom Lawton — Wallaby captain
- Cameron Lillicrap — Wallaby prop
- Dick Marks — Wallaby and national coaching director
- Greg Martin — Wallaby fullback
- Bob McCowan — Wallaby captain
- Andy McIntyre — Wallaby prop
- Fraser McReight — Wallaby flanker
- Stephen Moore — Wallaby captain
- Tom Murday
- Frank Nicholson — Wallaby captain
- David Nucifora — Wallaby hooker
- Bill Ross — Wallaby hooker
- Chilla Wilson — Wallaby captain
- Keith Winning — Wallaby captain
- Alec Evans — Queensland captain, Wallaby tourist, Wallaby assistant coach, Wales coach

==== Soccer ====
- Luke DeVere — QAS, AIS and Brisbane Roar and Socceroo centre back
- Matt McKay — captain of the Brisbane Roar FC and Socceroo midfielder

==== Tennis ====
- Roy Emerson — won 12 Grand Slam singles titles and 16 Grand Slam doubles titles
- Charlie Fancutt
- Michael Fancutt
- Edgar Moon — won 1930 Australian Open men's single title, 1932 men's doubles title, 1929 and 1934 mixed doubles titles
- John Millman

==== Other sports ====
- Trent Baker — pitcher and outfielder for the Cleveland Indians and Brisbane Bandits baseball teams
- Francis Gailey — Australian/American freestyle swimmer
- Lee Holdsworth — V8 supercar driver
- Toby Jenkins — Olympic water polo player 2004
- Dick Johnson — V8 supercar driver

=== Rhodes Scholars ===
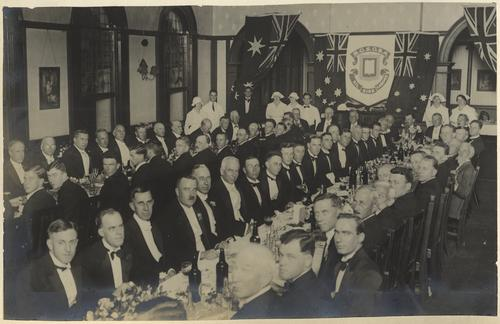
Brisbane Grammar Old Boys' Association dinner with the Queensland Governor, 1927

Year of election	Name
1904	Arthur S. Roe
1905	Norman Leslie
1908	Stanley Castlehow
1909	Leonard G Brown
1911	Harold K. Denham
1914	Allan W.L. Row
1915	John N. Radcliffe
1918	Frederick W. Paterson
1919	Victor Grenning
1922	Tom Lawton
1927	Franz Konrad Saddler Hirschfeld
1928	John H. Lavery
1930	Cecil E. Kerr
1939	James K. Newman
1958	Thomas Baxter
1960	Clive P. Hildebrand
1967	John M. Fenwick
1978	Peter J. Wetherall
1981	Donald Markwell
1982	David M. Rose
1991	Craig Arnott
1992	Daniel V. Botsman
2006	Nicholas I. Luke
2007	Ryan A. Goss
2020	Nicholas Salmon
2024	Jeremy Hunt

== See also ==
- List of schools in Queensland
- List of boarding schools
