= Jock R. Anderson =

Agricultural economist

- Born: 23 January 1941 (age 85); Monto, Queensland
- Education: University of Queensland, University of New England
- Occupations: Agricultural economist, Professor emeritus of agricultural economics
- Organization(s): University of New England, World Bank
- Known for: Agricultural development economics, Risk and decision theory, Rural development policy at the World Bank
- Notable work: Agricultural Decision Analysis, Coping with Risk in Agriculture
- Awards: Distinguished Foreign Scholar, Mid-America State Universities Association; Distinguished Fellow, Australian Agricultural and Resource Economics Society; Doctor of the University, University of New England

Jock Robert Anderson (born 23 January 1941) is an Australian agricultural economist, specialising in agricultural development economics, risk and decision theory, and international rural development policy. Born in Monto, Queensland, he studied at the University of Queensland, attaining bachelor's and master's degrees in agricultural science. After graduation, Anderson joined the Faculty of Agricultural Economics at the University of New England. At New England, he focused on research in farm management, risk, and uncertainty and received a doctor of philosophy in economics in 1970. In 1977, Anderson co-authored a book, Agricultural Decision Analysis, which has served as an influential source on risk and decision analysis for agricultural economics researchers and the agricultural industry.

From 1978 to 1979, Anderson was chief research economist at the Australian Bureau of Agricultural Economics, the first holder of that role. In 1991, he was appointed an emeritus professor at New England and departed to a full-time position as an agricultural economist and rural development policy advisor at the World Bank in Washington D.C. He retired from the World Bank in 2003. A prolific author and editor of papers and publications related to his field, Anderson has continued to write and consult in retirement. He was elected a fellow and/or presiding member of a number of professional agricultural, economic, and science organizations, including as a Distinguished Fellow in the Australian Agricultural and Resource Economics Society. He was honored with a Doctor of the University by the University of New England in 2006 and Doctor of Agricultural Science by the University of Queensland in 2014.

== Early life and education ==
Anderson was born at Monto, Queensland, to parents Robert William and Nellie Frances Anderson on 23 January 1941. As a child he lived on and helped tend his family's beef, pig, wheat, and sorghum farm, called "Clifton Hills," in the Upper Burnett area of Queensland. Due to an absence of high schools in his rural area, for his postprimary education Anderson traveled to Brisbane to attend Brisbane Grammar School. He graduated in 1958 and was awarded an open scholarship to the University of Queensland.

At the University of Queensland, Anderson majored in agricultural economics, with a focus in applied production. He received a Bachelor of Agricultural Science with First Class Honors in 1963. Continuing with postgraduate studies at the University of Queensland, Anderson received a Master of Agricultural Science in 1965. While working towards his masters, he was selected and worked as a research fellow for the university's department of agriculture, sponsored by Sir Edmund Marsden Tooth. At the same time, he served as a science tutor at the university's Emmanuel College campus.

== Career ==
=== University of New England ===
After receiving his master's degree, Anderson was employed as a research agronomist and applied production economist for ACF & Shirleys Fertilizers Ltd in Brisbane. He departed Brisbane one year later, in 1966, to join the faculty of the University of New England at its campus in Armidale, New South Wales. Anderson served as a research fellow under John L. Dillon, Foundation Chair of Farm Management, studying the pastoral-zone wool industry of Queensland and New South Wales. The two particularly focused on risk management, biometric, and econometric issues related to farm management. Under Dillon's guidance, Anderson received a Doctor of Philosophy (PhD) in Economics in 1970.

Anderson afterward became a lecturer in farm economic statistics until 1972, before becoming a senior lecturer between 1973 and 1974. In 1975 he was appointed as an associate professor, and in 1984 became a full-time professor (personal chair) in agricultural economics and business management, a position he held until 1991. In 1973, Anderson took a sabbatical as a visiting professor of agricultural economics at the Indian Agricultural Research Institute, beginning his career-long work with agricultural development economics.

At New England, Anderson specialized in risk and uncertainty, in particular Bayesian statistics, stochastic processes and efficiency analysis, and modern decision theory as applied to agricultural economics. Along with Dillon and J. Brian Hardaker, Anderson co-authored a 1977 book, Agricultural Decision Analysis, which served as an influential source on risk and decision analysis for agricultural economics researchers and the agricultural industry. The American Journal of Agricultural Economics described the expository text as "Something of a classic in the field, especially amongst graduate students of U.S. colleges."

From 1978 to 1979, Anderson took a leave of absence to serve as deputy director and chief research economist for the Australian government's Bureau of Agricultural Economics (BAE) (later called Australian Bureau of Agricultural and Resource Economics) in Canberra. With BAE, he managed a portfolio consisting of 200 economic researchers examining current issues and aspects of the agricultural industry.

Upon his return to New England in 1980, Anderson was appointed dean of Faculty of Economic Studies, serving in the position until 1982. In 1981, New England awarded him a publications-based doctorate of economics. From 1986 through 1988 Anderson was head of the university's Department of Agricultural Economics and Business Management. In 1991 the university designated him an emeritus professor of agricultural economics.

=== World Bank ===
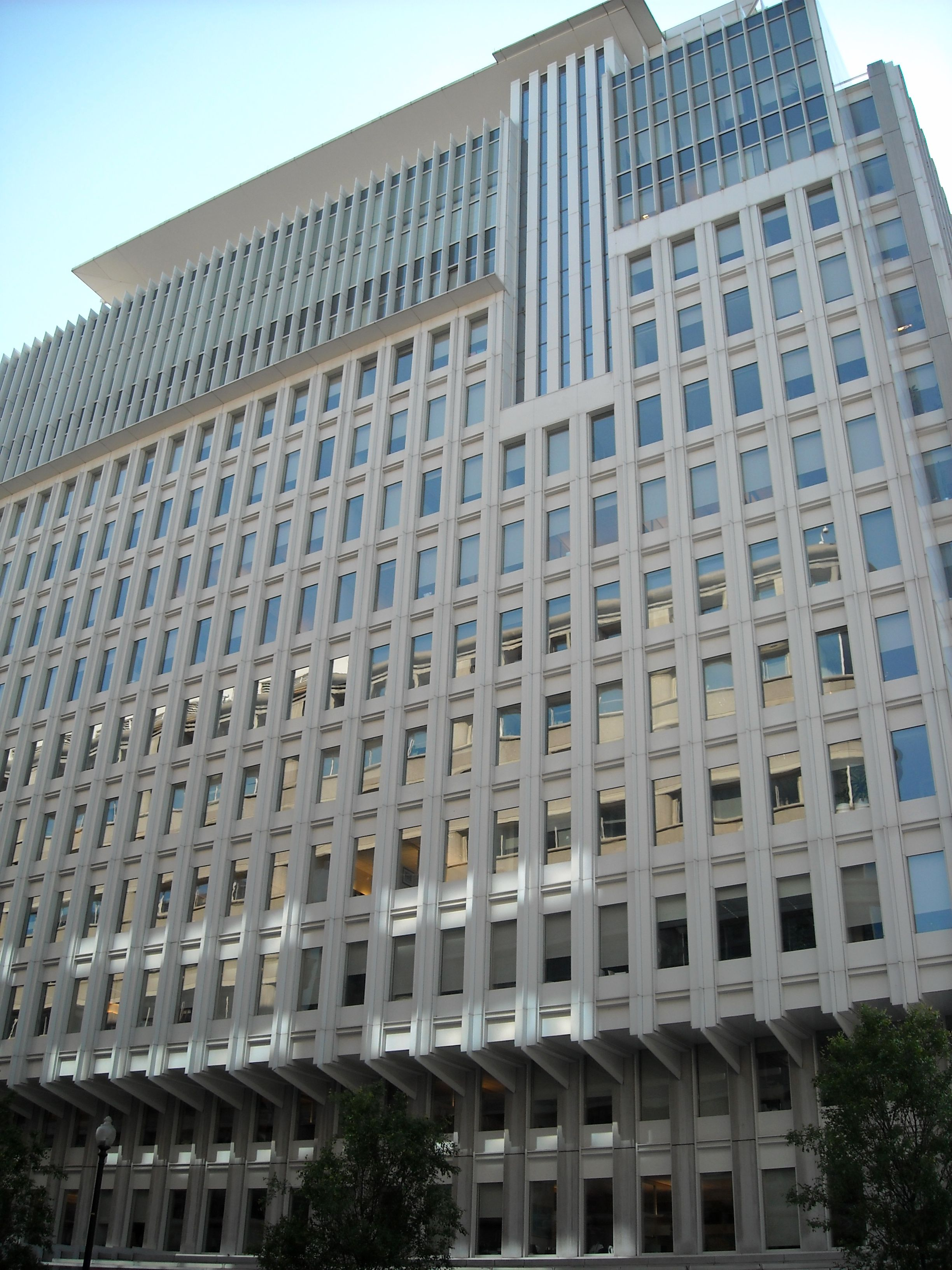
World Bank building in Washington D.C.

While at New England, Anderson at times did part-time consultant work for the World Bank. First, in 1977, with the bank's Development Research Center.

In 1989 Anderson accepted a full-time position with the World Bank and moved to Washington, D.C., to work at the bank's headquarters. From 1989 until 1993 he served as principal economist for the bank's Agricultural Policies Division, Agriculture and Rural Development Department. In 1994 Anderson became an advisor in agricultural technology to the bank's Agriculture and Natural Resources Department. From 1996 to 1998 he worked as evaluation adviser for the bank's Operations Evaluation Department. Anderson subsequently returned to the Agriculture and Rural Development Department, where he served as a portfolio and strategy and policy advisor. He retired from the World Bank on 31 January 2003.

While at the World Bank, Anderson focused on agricultural research. He documented his work in a series of books, reports, and papers.

During his time with the World Bank, Anderson accompanied a number of in-country missions, including to Bangladesh, Brazil, Ethiopia, Guinea, India, Indonesia, Kenya, Lesotho, Malawi, Morocco, Nepal, Pakistan, Papua New Guinea, Pakistan, Russia, Tanzania, Uganda, Uzbekistan, and Zimbabwe. He also worked with research studies on Burkina Faso, India, Kenya, and Malawi.

In 1990 Anderson co-authored the third edition of Dillon's The Analysis of Response in Crop and Livestock Production. The book continued the work of the first two editions in teaching crop and livestock analysis while introducing modelling principles, economic duality as it pertains to response processes, the analysis of aggregate response, and the economics of response research. In 1992, again with Dillon, Anderson co-authored Risk Analysis in Dryland Farming Systems which, as its title suggested, focused on risk analysis in dryland farming systems in less-developed regions.

=== Further work ===
In 2004 the second edition of Coping with Risk in Agriculture, co-authored by Anderson, Hardaker, Ruud B. M. Huirne, G. Lien, was published. The book was intended as a replacement text for Agricultural Decision Analysis and was targeted at senior undergraduate or graduate students of farm management, agricultural researchers, farm advisors, veterinarians, farmers, and policy makers. A third edition including copulas was published in 2015 as Hardaker, J.B., Lien, G., Anderson, J.R. and Huirne, R.B.M. (2015), Coping with Risk in Agriculture: Applied Decision Analysis, CABI Publishing, Wallingford. More recently, Anderson served as an Editor in Chief of Encyclopedia of Food Security and Sustainability, Elsevier, Oxford (3 volumes).

=== Consultancies ===
Throughout his career at New England, in addition to his work with the World Bank Anderson also acted as a consultant for several outside organizations. In 1973 he served as an economist for the International Maize and Wheat Improvement Center (CIMMYT) in Mexico. From 1976 to 1986, he worked with the CIMMYT's parent organization Consultative Group on International Agricultural Research (known by its acronym, CGIAR). He began consulting for the World Bank in 1975, first in its Development Research Center, then the Agriculture and Rural Development Department, the Economic Analysis and Projections Department, and finally, from 1984 to 1985, as director, Study of the Impact of the International Agricultural Research Centers, CGIAR Secretariat. In 1988, Anderson, with R. W. Herdt and G. M. Scobie, coauthored a book on CGIAR titled, Science and Food: The CGIAR and its Partners.

=== Professional associations ===
Anderson's professional associations while at New England included membership in the Australian Agricultural and Resource Economics Society (AARES), for which he was elected president in 1981, serving in that position for one year. Also in 1981, he was an exchange fellow in the Academies' Australia-China Exchange in the Humanities and Social Sciences. From 1982 to 1983, Anderson served as a research fellow in the Resource Systems Institute of the East–West Center, based in Honolulu, Hawaii. In 1984 he selected as a Distinguished Foreign Scholar of the Mid-American State Universities Association. In 1985 and 1988 he was respectively named a fellow in the Australian Institute of Agricultural Science and the World Academy of Productivity Science. In 1996, Anderson was selected as a fellow of the American Agricultural Economics Association and in 2003 as a distinguished fellow with AARES.

Anderson has served two cycles, from 1978 to 1980 and 1986 to 1990, as an associate editor and member of the editorial council for the American Journal of Agricultural Economics. From 1974 to 1977 he served on the editorial committee and, from 1978 to 1979, he was joint editor, with J. Brian Hardaker, of the Australian Journal of Agricultural Economics (AJAE), based in Canberra. From 1998 to the present, Anderson served on AJAE's editorial board. In 1989, he was a guest editor, along with J. L. Dillon, of a special issue of Agricultural Economics. In addition, in 1978, Anderson served as editorial manager for the Quarterly Review of Agricultural Economics.

== Family and personal life ==
While Anderson was studying at the University of Queensland, he met his wife Libby A. Johnson. They were married on 15 February 1964. They subsequently had two children, Jules, and Dianne.

In retirement, Anderson lived in the Washington DC area, where he continued to consult on agricultural issues. Anderson's hobbies include wine and croquet. According to the Australian Journal of Agricultural and Resource Economics, during his career Anderson was an important contributor to the larrikinism element in Australian agricultural economics.

== Awards and professional elections ==
- 1958 Open Scholarship to the University of Queensland (awarded at the Brisbane Grammar School)
- 1981 President and Fellow, Australian Agricultural Economics Society
- 1981 Exchange Fellow in the Academies' Australia-China Exchange in the Social Sciences
- 1984 Distinguished Foreign Scholar, Mid-America State Universities Association
- 1985 Fellow, Australian Institute of Agricultural Science
- 1988 Fellow, World Academy of Productivity Science
- 1996 Fellow, American Agricultural Economics Association
- 2000 Fellow, Academy of the Social Sciences in Australia
- 2003 Distinguished Fellow, Australian Agricultural and Resource Economics Society
- 2003 Honorary Life Membership of the International Association of Agricultural Economists
- 2006 Doctor of the University, h.c., University of New England
- 2014 Doctor of Agricultural Science, h.c., University of Queensland

== Selected publications ==
- Anderson, Jock R.; Dillon, John L.; Hardaker, J. Brian (30 January 1977). Agricultural Decision Analysis. Ames, Iowa: Iowa State University Press. p. 344. ISBN 978-0-8138-0400-2. OCLC 2524965.
- Anderson, J.R., Herdt, R.W., Scobie, G.M., Pray, C.E. and Jahnke, H.E. (1987), International Agricultural Research Centers: A Study of Achievements and Potential. Agricultural Economics Bulletin No. 32, Department of Agricultural Economics and Business Management, University of New England, Armidale, on microfiche, pp. 738, ISBN: 0858346931, digitized by NLA, Canberra, in 2026 from Call Number: N 338.10994 AGR. Available at UMN and ResearchGate.
- Anderson, Jock R.; Herdt, Robert W.; Scobie, Grant M.; Consultative Group on International Agricultural Research (CGIAR) (August 1988). Science and Food: The CGIAR and its Partners. Washington D.C.: World Bank. p. 134. ISBN 978-0-8213-0947-6. OCLC 18018677. Archived from the original on 20 March 2012.
- Anderson, Jock R.; Hazell, Peter B. R., eds. (1989). Variability in Grain Yields Implications for Agricultural Research and Policy in Developing Countries. Johns Hopkins University Press. ISBN 9780801837937.
- Dillon, John L.; Jock R. Anderson (1990). The Analysis of Response in Crop and Livestock Production (3rd ed.). University of Michigan: Pergamon Press. p. 251. ISBN 978-0-08-037493-2. OCLC 20693446.
- Anderson, Jock R.; John Dillon (1992). Risk Analysis in Dryland Farming. Rome: Food and Agriculture Organization of the United Nations. p. 109. ISBN 978-92-5-103204-6. OCLC 27123948.
- Anderson, Jock R., ed. (1994). Agricultural Technology: Policy Issues for the International Community. Wallingford, Oxfordshire: CAB International in association with the World Bank. p. 680. ISBN 978-0-85198-880-1. OCLC 231645676.
- Hardaker, J. Brian; Jock R. Anderson; Ruud B. M. Huirne; G. Lien (2004). Coping with Risk in Agriculture (2nd ed.). Wallingford, Oxfordshire: CAB International. p. 333. ISBN 978-0-85199-831-2. OCLC 57205154. 3rd edn 2015
