= Tim Caldwell =

Tim Caldwell may refer to:

- Tim Caldwell (skier) (born 1954), American cross country skier
- Tim Caldwell (cricketer) (1913–1994), Australian cricketer, chairman of the Australian Cricket Board and banker
