= Judge Logan =

Judge Logan may refer to:

- James Kenneth Logan (1929–2018), judge of the United States Court of Appeals for the Tenth Circuit
- John Logan (judge) (born 1956), judge of the Federal Court of Australia
- Steven Paul Logan (born 1965), judge of the United States District Court for the District of Arizona
