= Arthur Roe =

Arthur Roe may refer to:

- Arthur Roe (politician) (1878–1942), American politician and lawyer
- Arthur Stanley Roe, medical doctor from Queensland, Australia
- Arthur Roe (footballer) (1892–1960), English football half back
