= Military Court of Australia =

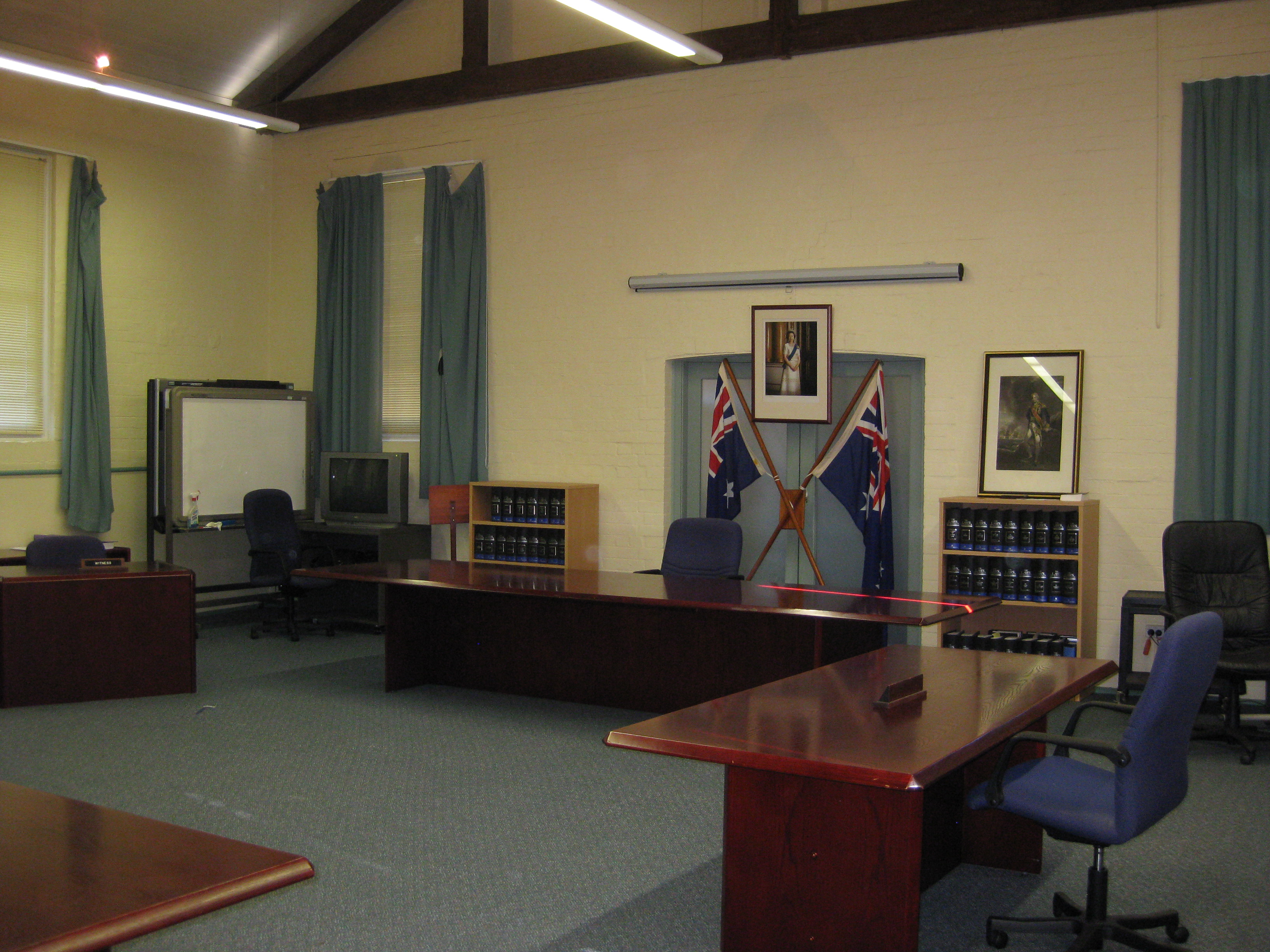
A court room used for Australian Defence Force legal proceedings at Victoria Barracks, Sydney

The Military Court of Australia was a proposed court of military justice for the Australian Defence Force. It would have replaced the previous Australian Military Court which was deemed unconstitutional by the High Court of Australia with legal grounding under Chapter 3 of the Australian Constitution. The structure of the court was drafted by the Australian Department of Defence and Attorney-General's Department and was introduced as a legislative bill to Parliament in 2012.

The bill lapsed with the prorogation of Parliament for the 2013 Australian federal election and has not been reintroduced. In the absence of a military court, the current military justice system involves the use of courts martial and "Defence Force Magistrate" trials.
