= John Laskey Woolcock =

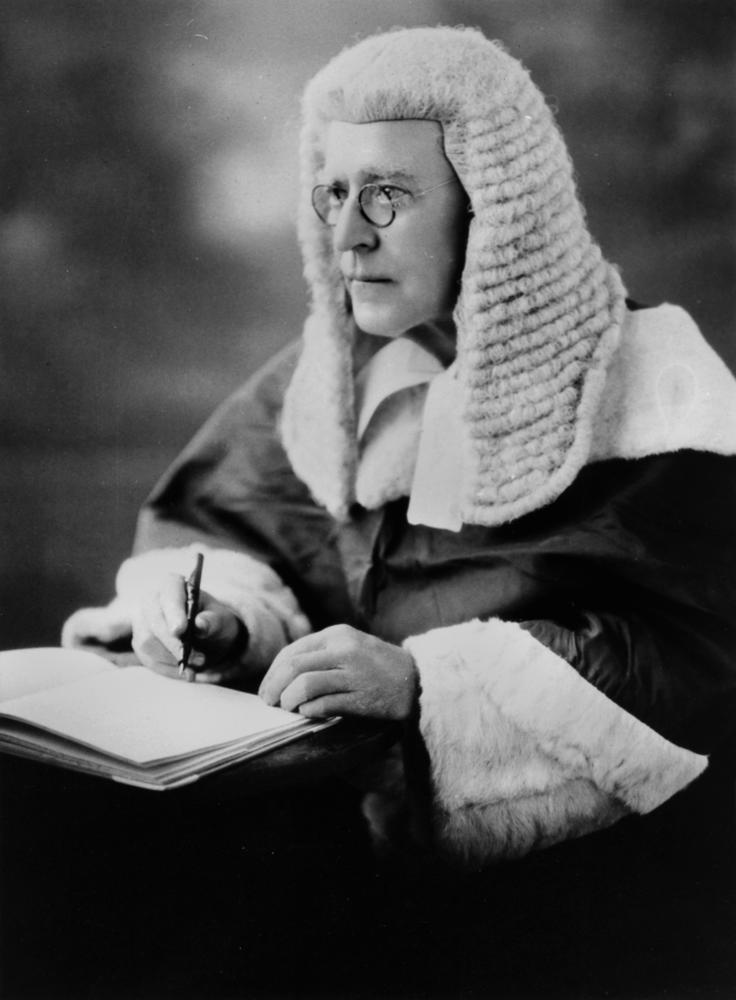
Judge John Laskey Woolcock

John Laskey Woolcock (7 November 1861 – 18 January 1929) was a barrister and Supreme Court judge in Queensland, Australia.

== Early life ==
Woolcock was born in St Clement, Cornwall, England, to Rev. William Woolcock and Elizabeth née White. John Woolcock came to Queensland with his family in 1866, and was educated at the Normal School and Brisbane Grammar School. Having won a Queensland exhibition scholarship Woolcock attended the University of Sydney, graduating B.A. in 1883.

== Career ==
Woolcock taught at Brisbane Grammar School and was later appointed private secretary to premier Sir Samuel Griffith; in that capacity Woolcock attended the colonial convention at Sydney in 1883, the federal council at Hobart in 1886, and the Imperial conference, London in 1887. Woolcock qualified as a barrister and was called to the Queensland bar on 6 December 1887. In April 1899 Woolcock was appointed Queensland parliamentary counsel with the right to continue his large private practice. Woolcock published a six-volume consolidation of The Queensland Statutes with Marcus Hertzberg (1911). In December 1926, with the general approval of the profession, Woolcock was appointed a judge of the Supreme Court and began his duties on 1 February 1927, although his health was already in decline. Woolcock died of endocarditis on 18 January 1929. Woolcock married twice; on 17 June 1891 to Miss Gertrude Mary Harper (d.1912) and subsequently on 27 May 1914 to Miss Ida Hague Withrington.
