= Elizabeth Eaton Rosenthal =

Canadian-American artist (born 1941)

- Born: Elizabeth Eaton; 1941 (age 84–85); Amherst, Nova Scotia, Canada
- Other names: Elizabeth Sweetheart; Green Lady of Brooklyn
- Education: Mount Allison University
- Occupations: Artist; designer
- Known for: Extensive use of the color green in her wardrobe and home decor
- Spouse: Robert Rosenthal
- Children: 1

Elizabeth Eaton Rosenthal (née Eaton; born 1941), also known as Elizabeth Sweetheart and nicknamed the "Green Lady of Brooklyn", is a Canadian-American artist and designer based in Brooklyn. She is known for her love of the color green, which she wears and decorates her home with nearly exclusively.

== Early life ==
Elizabeth Eaton was born in the small manufacturing town of Amherst, Nova Scotia, Canada. She was greatly influenced by her grandparents, who lived with her mother while her father, Dr. Robert Burrell Eaton, served as a field surgeon during World War II. She spent many summers with her grandfather at his log cabin on the shores of the Bay of Fundy. Her grandmother taught Elizabeth to paint and to make clothing.

She attended Mount Allison University where she studied fine arts with Canadian painter Alex Colville.

== Career ==
Unable to find appropriate work in Canada, Eaton hitchhiked to New York City in 1964. Arriving at a New York unemployment agency with a pillow and her sketchbook, she was sent for a job interview and was quickly hired by an art department in the garment district.

In 1987, Eaton established her own design company, SweetPea Design Studio, which she ran for 15 years. She then ran a small art business selling fabrics from her collection of vintage fabrics.

Eaton has created prints for designers such as Michael Kors, Liz Claiborne, Calvin Klein, American Eagle Outfitters, and Ralph Lauren. She also makes small watercolour paintings.

In 2025, Eaton made a cameo in the music video for Chappell Roan's song "The Subway".

== Style ==
Known as the "Green Lady of Brooklyn," Eaton always wears green and decorates her home in various shades of green. She has donned green, from head to toe, including bright lime green hair, since about 2000. She is usually seen wearing overalls, and has about 30 pairs, all dyed green.

== Personal life ==
Eaton married Robert Rosenthal, also an artist, in 1966 or 1967. They have one son, Sam Eaton, who is a mentalist and magician.
