= The Subway (song) =

Single by Chappell Roan
- B-side: "I Hate It Here" (demo)
- Released: July 31, 2025
- Genre: Pop; alt-pop; dream pop; power pop
- Length: 4:12
- Label: Amusement; Island
- Songwriters: Chappell Roan; Dan Nigro
- Producer: Dan Nigro

Chappell Roan singles chronology
| "The Giver" (2025) | "The Subway" (2025) | "Expectations" (2026) |

Music video
- "The Subway" on YouTube

"The Subway" is a song by the American singer and songwriter Chappell Roan, released as a single through Amusement and Island Records on July 31, 2025. It is a pop, alt-pop, dream pop, and power pop breakup ballad with jangle pop, shoegaze, and 1990s rock influences. Lyrically, the song deals with heartbreak and healing and is linked stylistically to Roan's 2022 single "Casual".

Roan has performed "The Subway" live since mid-2024, but had been hesitant to release a studio version, feeling that the track worked better live. Roan was spotted filming a music video in New York City in July 2025, alongside teasers for the song's release in the form of various posters. On July 23, a preview of "The Subway" was released on YouTube and a teaser for the music video was shared on social media. The song's music video depicts Roan chasing her former lover when she leaves her. On November 7, 2025, "The Subway" was nominated at the 68th Annual Grammy Awards in the categories Record of the Year and Best Pop Solo Performance.

"The Subway" debuted at number three on the Billboard Hot 100, becoming Roan's highest-charting single to date in her home country. Outside of the United States, "The Subway" topped the charts in the United Kingdom, and peaked within the top five of the charts in Australia, Canada, Ireland, and New Zealand.

== Background and composition ==
Following several live performances of the song, Roan was first approached by Isabela Yu of Elle Brasil about it in July 2024. At that time, she was unsure whether she wanted to release it as her next single. The singer thought it was "fun" to include the song in her set at the Governors Ball Music Festival, as it fit the theme. The following month, she discussed the song with Bowen Yang of Interview, comparing its prolonged rollout to that of her debut studio album. In a September 2024 interview with Brittany Spanos of Rolling Stone, Roan revealed that she preferred performing the song live rather than releasing it as a single, and she had two other songs prepared for performances.

On April 16, 2025, talking to the Las Culturistas podcast, Roan explained that the delay in releasing the studio version was due to fans' expectations following the live rendition. She noted she had yet to replicate the vocal performance in the studio and believed the song worked better live than as a recorded track. Responding to the muted reception of her previous single "The Giver", which she also performed live prior to its release, Roan anticipated a similar reaction to "The Subway", emphasizing that a different response "does not always mean bad". Lyrically, "The Subway" explores themes of "heartbreak and healing" and has been linked stylistically by Roan to her 2022 single "Casual".

"The Subway" has been described as a mellow pop, alt-pop, dream pop, and power pop breakup ballad, with jangle pop, shoegaze, and 1990s rock influences. It has been compared to the works of the Cocteau Twins, the Cranberries, the Sundays, and Sixpence None the Richer.

The song is written in the key of B-flat major with a time signature of 4/4 . The song begins at a tempo of 83 beats per minute (BPM), which increases to 84 BPM at the 2:10 mark during the final post-chorus ("I don't look for you at the staircase") and remains at this speed for the rest of the track.

== Promotion ==
Roan premiered "The Subway" live for the first time during her set at the Governors Ball Music Festival 2024, held at Flushing Meadows–Corona Park. The performance attracted attention for Roan's costume, in which she dressed as a New York taxi. Following the show, she changed her Instagram profile picture to the Subway logo. Roan later performed the song during select dates of her Midwest Princess Tour, including shows in Norfolk and Columbia, as well as at her Lollapalooza 2024 set.

Advertisements for some kind of release on August 1, 2025, started being spotted in New York City c. July 23; later that day, a preview of the song was released on YouTube and a teaser for the music video was shared on social media. On July 28, the release date was set for July 31. On July 30, the music video was announced for release on August 1.

== Critical reception ==
"The Subway" has garnered acclaim from music critics. Shaad D'Souza of Pitchfork praised Roan as "one of pop's most distinctive writers", writing that the song "sounds totally fresh" despite having a "familiarity". D'Souza describes this combination of "familiarity and novelty" as being "Roan's real magic trick". Paolo Ragusa of Consequence also praised Roan's songwriting, saying that "The Subway" traces "the sting of a breakup with more passionate, majestic songwriting". Ragusa notes that the song has more "subtlety" than is typical of Roan's music. David Renshaw of The Fader similarly wrote that Roan "puts feeling ahead of the exuberance of her biggest hits".

Several publications reported that, following the song’s release, tourism interest in the Canadian province of Saskatchewan surged. The province saw its first increase in U.S. Google Trends searches in two years, and its tourism board recorded over 50,000 combined social media and webpage interactions as of August 2025. Roan vowed to perform in Saskatchewan, and Tourism Saskatchewan CEO Jonathan Potts explained that typically generating this level of publicity would cost "the better part of our budget".

=== Year-end lists ===
Select year-end rankings of "The Subway"
| Publication | List | Rank | Ref. |
|---|---|---|---|
| USA Today | 10 Best Songs of 2025 | 2 | |
| Entertainment Weekly | The 10 Best Songs of 2025 | 2 | |
| The Guardian | The 20 Best Songs of 2025 | 3 | |
| Los Angeles Times | The 25 Best Songs of 2025 | 3 | |
| Business Insider | The Best Songs of 2023 | 5 | |
| Billboard | The 100 Best Songs of 2025: Staff Picks | 8 | |
| Rolling Stone | The 100 Best Songs of 2025 | 10 | |
| The Associated Press | AP's Top Songs of 2025 | unranked (Note: The Associated Press' list contains their picks for the 10 best songs of 2025, presented in no particular order.) | |
| The Independent | Our Favourite Songs of 2025 | unranked (Note: The Independent's list contains The Independent's culture team's 10 favorite songs of 2025, presented in no particular order.) | |

== Commercial performance ==
"The Subway" debuted at number 1 on the UK Singles Chart, the highest charting debut of Roan's career in the UK, surpassing her previous record for "The Giver". This record made Roan the first artist to achieve two number ones on the UK Singles Chart in 2025; after "Pink Pony Club" charted at the position in March of that year.

"The Subway" also debuted in the top 5 in the United States, Canada, Australia, Ireland and New Zealand, and debuted in the top 40 in Netherlands, Norway and Iceland.

== Music video ==
Roan was seen filming a music video, believed to be for “The Subway”, on July 7, 2025, in New York City. She wore a red, "Rapunzel-esque" outfit while gazing out from above a fire escape.

In the video, Roan, wearing a large red wig, walks through busy New York City streets where she notices a woman whose face is obscured by large green hair. Upon making eye contact, Roan begins chasing the woman through the streets and into the subway. Sequences on the subway show Roan appearing to search for the green-haired woman, intercut with visions of her.

The narrative then shifts to an intimate fire escape scene overlooking the city, where Roan wears a shimmery hair bullet bra and skirt. In a later sequence set in a yellow taxi, Roan catches sight of what she believes to be the green-haired woman's silhouette. As she tries to exit, her long red hair becomes caught in the taxi door, pulling her away.

Throughout the video, flashbacks to the fire escape and subway carriage are shown alongside a dance sequence on a subway train, where Roan wears a jacket and skirt made from hair. Additional scenes depict Roan riding a bicycle through the city with her hair trailing behind and collecting debris, floating in the Washington Square Park fountain, and appearing in business attire with short hair while surrounded by swirling wind and rubbish.

The storyline culminates with Roan seeing the green-haired woman embraced by another red-haired woman, followed by Roan climbing a large pillar of green hair suspended over the city. The video ends with her sitting beside a fountain eating pizza, before cutting to a final shot of her waking up on the subway.

Amber Grace Johnson directed the music video, shooting on 35mm film. Roan was styled by Genesis Webb, with hair by Lacy Redway and makeup by Andrew Dahling.

The opening chase sequence features large textured red and green sculptural hair costumes created by French hair designer Charlie Le Mindu.

A shimmer cone bra and skirt ensemble crafted from human hair, accented with rhinestone undergarments, was designed by Australian fashion designer Connor O'Grady. This look appears in the fire escape scene overlooking the city.

A hair jacket and skirt, constructed from human hair bundles, lace closures and wigs, inspired by Maison Margiela's 2009 hair coats, was collaboratively designed by hairstylist John Novotny and designer Todd Thomas. This outfit is worn in the subway dance sequence.

A grey oversized suit and tie designed by James Nguyen and AC Gottlieb is worn during the taxi scene in which Roan is dragged by her hair.

The video features a cameo from Elizabeth Eaton Rosenthal, also known as the "Green Lady of Brooklyn".

== Personnel ==
Credits are adapted from Apple Music and Tidal.

- Chappell Roan – vocals, composition, lyrics
- Daniel Nigro – guitar, bass, percussion, synthesizer, background vocals, composition, lyrics, production, programming engineering, recording engineering
- Sterling Mitchell Laws – drum kit
- Paul Cartwright – viola, violin
- Lily Elise – background vocals
- Chris Kaysch – engineering
- Mitch McCarthy – mixing engineering
- Randy Merrill – mastering engineering

== Charts ==
=== Weekly charts ===
Weekly chart performance
| Chart (2025–2026) | Peak position |
|---|---|
| Australia (ARIA) | 4 |
| Austria (Ö3 Austria Top 40) | 25 |
| Belgium (Ultratop 50 Flanders) | 24 |
| Belgium (Ultratop 50 Wallonia) | 16 |
| Bolivia Anglo Airplay (Monitor Latino) | 7 |
| Brazil Hot 100 (Billboard) | 55 |
| Canada Hot 100 (Billboard) | 4 |
| Canada Hot AC (Billboard) | 30 |
| Canada CHR/Top 40 (Billboard) | 24 |
| Central America Anglo Airplay (Monitor Latino) | 17 |
| Chile Anglo Airplay (Monitor Latino) | 12 |
| Colombia Anglo Airplay (Monitor Latino) | 6 |
| Colombia Anglo Airplay (National-Report) | 7 |
| Costa Rica Anglo Airplay (Monitor Latino) | 8 |
| Croatia International Airplay (Top lista) | 14 |
| Ecuador Anglo Airplay (Monitor Latino) | 11 |
| El Salvador Anglo Airplay (Monitor Latino) | 3 |
| Estonia Airplay (TopHit) | 46 |
| Finland (Suomen virallinen lista) | 47 |
| Finland Airplay (Radiosoittolista) | 37 |
| France (SNEP) | 120 |
| Germany (GfK) | 63 |
| Global 200 (Billboard) | 3 |
| Greece International Streaming (IFPI) | 20 |
| Guatemala Anglo Airplay (Monitor Latino) | 2 |
| Iceland (Tónlistinn) | 16 |
| Ireland (IRMA) | 2 |
| Israel International Airplay (Media Forest) | 1 |
| Japan Hot Overseas (Billboard Japan) | 4 |
| Latin America Anglo Airplay (Monitor Latino) | 17 |
| Latvia Airplay (LaIPA) | 15 |
| Lebanon (Lebanese Top 20) | 2 |
| Lithuania (AGATA) | 43 |
| Lithuania Airplay (TopHit) | 23 |
| Malta Airplay (Radiomonitor) | 11 |
| Mexico Anglo Airplay (Monitor Latino) | 13 |
| Netherlands (Dutch Top 40) | 21 |
| Netherlands (Single Top 100) | 35 |
| New Zealand (Recorded Music NZ) | 3 |
| Nigeria (TurnTable Top 100) | 84 |
| Norway (IFPI Norge) | 17 |
| Paraguay Anglo Airplay (Monitor Latino) | 7 |
| Peru Anglo Airplay (Monitor Latino) | 5 |
| Philippines (IFPI) | 8 |
| Philippines (Philippines Hot 100) | 7 |
| Poland (Polish Streaming Top 100) | 50 |
| Portugal (AFP) | 21 |
| Romania Airplay (TopHit) | 86 |
| Singapore (RIAS) | 15 |
| Spain (Promusicae) | 94 |
| South Africa Airplay (TOSAC) | 4 |
| Sweden (Sverigetopplistan) | 22 |
| Switzerland (Schweizer Hitparade) | 36 |
| UK Singles (Official Charts) | 1 |
| US Billboard Hot 100 | 3 |
| US Adult Pop Airplay (Billboard) | 29 |
| US Pop Airplay (Billboard) | 26 |
| Venezuela Anglo Airplay (Monitor Latino) | 10 |

=== Monthly charts ===
Monthly chart performance for "The Subway"
| Chart (2025) | Peak position |
|---|---|
| Estonia Airplay (TopHit) | 75 |
| Lithuania Airplay (TopHit) | 30 |

=== Year-end charts ===
Year-end chart performance for "The Subway"
| Chart (2025) | Position |
|---|---|
| Belgium (Ultratop 50 Flanders) | 140 |
| Belgium (Ultratop 50 Wallonia) | 137 |
| Canada Hot AC (Billboard) | 93 |

== Certifications ==
Certifications for "The Subway"
| Region | Certification | Certified units/sales |
|---|---|---|
| Australia (ARIA) | Gold | 35,000^{‡} |
| Brazil (Pro-Música Brasil) | 2× Platinum | 80,000^{‡} |
| Canada (Music Canada) | Gold | 40,000^{‡} |
| New Zealand (RMNZ) | Platinum | 30,000^{‡} |
| United Kingdom (BPI) | Platinum | 600,000^{‡} |
| United States (RIAA) | Gold | 500,000^{‡} |
^{‡} Sales+streaming figures based on certification alone.

== Release history ==
Release dates and formats for "The Subway"
| Region | Date | Format(s) | Label | Ref. |
|---|---|---|---|---|
| Various | July 31, 2025 | Digital download; streaming | Amusement; Island | |
| Italy | August 1, 2025 | Radio airplay | Island Italy | |
| United States | August 12, 2025 | Contemporary hit radio | Amusement; Island | |
| Various | October 31, 2025 | 7-inch single | Amusement; Island | |
| Various | November 10, 2025 | 12-inch single | Amusement; Island | |

== See also ==
- List of Billboard Hot 100 top-ten singles in 2025
- List of top 10 singles for 2025 in Australia
- List of UK Singles Chart number ones of the 2020s
