= List of top 10 singles for 2025 in Australia =

This is a list of songs that charted in the top ten of the ARIA Charts in 2025. Starting on the week of 8 September 2025, the ARIA Charts will only allow songs within two years of release to appear on the ARIA Top 50 singles chart.

== Top-ten singles ==
An asterisk (*) represents that a single is in the top ten as of the issue dated 21 September 2026.

Key

Symbol	Meaning
◁	Indicates single's top 10 entry was also its ARIA top 50 debut
(#)	2025 Year-end top 10 single position and rank

List of ARIA top ten singles that peaked in 2025
Top ten entry date	Single	Artist(s)	Peak	Peak date	Weeks in top ten	Refs.
Singles from 2024
13 May	"Not Like Us" ◁	Kendrick Lamar	1	17 February	16	
2 December	"Luther" ◁	Kendrick Lamar and SZA	2	24 February	10	
23 December	"Messy" (#8)	Lola Young	1	3 February	20	
Singles from 2025
13 January	"The Days - NOTION Remix" (#10)	Chrystal	5	27 January	5	
3 February	"Sports Car"◁	Tate McRae	8	17 March	5	
17 February	"Pink Pony Club"	Chappell Roan	2	28 April	20	
17 March	"Anxiety"◁	Doechii	1	24 March	5	
24 March	"Ordinary" (#1)	Alex Warren	1	31 March	74*	
24 March	"Evil J0rdan"◁	Playboi Carti	7	24 March	1	
7 April	"Nokia"	Drake	5	14 April	5	
5 May	"What Was That"◁	Lorde	9	5 May	1	
12 May	"Undressed"	Sombr	2	12 May	11	
12 May	"Love Me Not"	Ravyn Lenae	2	7 July	14*	
19 May	"Back to Friends"	Sombr	3	26 May	21	
9 June	"Just Keep Watching"◁	Tate McRae	5	9 June	4	
16 June	"Manchild"◁	Sabrina Carpenter	2	16 June	6	
30 June	"Victory Lap"◁	Fred Again, Skepta, PlaqueBoyMax	3	30 June	6	
30 June	"No Broke Boys"	Tinashe, Disco Lines	3	25 August	33	
7 July	"Golden"◁ (#2)	Ejae, Audrey Nuna, and Rei Ami, KPop Demon Hunters	1	4 August	36	
14 July	"Your Idol"	Saja Boys, KPop Demon Hunters	4	28 July	13	
21 July	"Daisies"◁	Justin Bieber	1	28 July	15	
21 July	"Soda Pop"	Saja Boys: Andrew Choi, Neckwav, Danny Chung, Kevin Woo, SamUIL Lee, KPop Demon Hunters	4	25 August	13	
28 July	"How It's Done"	Ejae, Audrey Nuna and Rei Ami, KPop Demon Hunters	7	4 August	9	
28 July	"Eternity"◁	Alex Warren	10	28 July	1	
11 August	"The Subway"◁	Chappell Roan	4	11 August	2	
11 August	"What It Sounds Like"	KPop Demon Hunters	8	25 August	6	
25 August	"Free"	Rumi, Jinu and KPop Demon Hunters	10	25 August	2	
8 September	"Tears"◁	Sabrina Carpenter	3	8 September	3	
8 September	"Man I Need"	Olivia Dean	1	24 November	56*	
22 September	"12 to 12"	Sombr	6	22 September	22	
6 October	"Tit for Tat"◁	Tate McRae	6	6 October	1	
6 October	"Nice to Each Other"	Olivia Dean	8	1 December	9	
13 October	"The Fate of Ophelia"◁	Taylor Swift	1	13 October	23	
13 October	"Opalite"◁	Taylor Swift	2	13 October	12	
13 October	"Elizabeth Taylor"◁	Taylor Swift	3	13 October	5	
13 October	"Father Figure"◁	Taylor Swift	4	13 October	3	
13 October	"Wood"◁	Taylor Swift	5	13 October	2	
13 October	"The Life of a Showgirl"◁	Taylor Swift featuring Sabrina Carpenter	6	13 October	2	
13 October	"Cancelled!"◁	Taylor Swift	7	13 October	1	
13 October	"Actually Romantic"◁	Taylor Swift	8	13 October	2	
13 October	"Wi$h Li$t"◁	Taylor Swift	9	13 October	2	
13 October	"Eldest Daughter"◁	Taylor Swift	10	13 October	1	
17 November	"I Run"◁	Haven	8	17 November	1	
1 December	"Do It"◁	Stray Kids	10	1 December	1	
8 December	"I Run"◁	Kaitlin Aragon featuring HVN.	9	8 December	4	

=== 2018 peaks ===
List of ARIA top ten singles in 2025 that peaked in 2018
Top ten entry date	Single	Artist(s)	Peak	Peak date	Weeks in top ten	References
19 February	"All the Stars"	Kendrick Lamar and SZA	2	26 February	9	

=== 2024 peaks ===
List of ARIA top ten singles in 2025 that peaked in 2024
Top ten entry date	Single	Artist(s)	Peak	Peak date	Weeks in top ten	References
29 January	"Lose Control"	Teddy Swims	4	15 April	17	
5 February	"Beautiful Things" (#7)	Benson Boone	1	11 March	69	
22 April	"Espresso" ◁	Sabrina Carpenter	1	13 May	35	
6 May	"A Bar Song (Tipsy)" (#9)	Shaboozey	1	8 July	41	
20 May	"I Had Some Help" ◁	Post Malone featuring Morgan Wallen	1	20 May	33	
27 May	"Birds of a Feather" ◁ (#6)	Billie Eilish	1	19 August	57	
8 July	"Good Luck, Babe!"	Chappell Roan	4	19 August	19	
26 August	"Die With A Smile" ◁ (#5)	Bruno Mars and Lady Gaga	2	23 September	43	
2 September	"Taste" ◁	Sabrina Carpenter	1	2 September	20	
28 October	"Apt." ◁ (#3)	Rosé and Bruno Mars	1	28 October	33	
4 November	"That's So True" (#4)	Gracie Abrams	1	18 November	31	

=== 2026 peaks ===
List of ARIA top ten singles in 2025 that peaked in 2026
Top ten entry date	Single	Artist(s)	Peak	Peak date	Weeks in top ten	References
27 October	"So Easy (To Fall in Love)"	Olivia Dean	2	9 February	32	
10 November	"Where Is My Husband!"	Raye	3	26 January	24	

== See also ==
- List of number-one singles of 2025 (Australia)
