= Tom Strachan =

Australian businessman (1974–2022)

Thomas Anthony Strachan (1974 – 29 August 2022) was an Australian businessman and a founder of AWX, which specialises in labour hire.

AWX was founded in 2000 by Strachan. The company was sold to a group of investors in 2016.

In 2013, the Business Review Weekly (BRW) estimated he was worth $25 million. The following year, he was worth $15 million.

He was a student at Brisbane Grammar School.

Strachan died in a plane crash with his son Noah and pilot Gary Liehm near Fernvale, on 29 August 2022, aged 48.
