= The Giver (song) =

2025 single by Chappell Roan

Single by Chappell Roan
- B-side: "Fix It in the Morning" (demo)
- Released: March 13, 2025
- Recorded: 2024
- Genre: Country; country pop
- Length: 3:22
- Label: Amusement; Island
- Songwriters: Chappell Roan; Dan Nigro
- Producer: Dan Nigro

Chappell Roan singles chronology
"Good Luck, Babe!" (2024)	"The Giver" (2025)	"The Subway" (2025)

Lyric video
- "The Giver" on YouTube

"The Giver" is a song by American singer-songwriter Chappell Roan. It was released as a single through Amusement and Island Records on March 13, 2025. It is her first song in the country music genre.

"The Giver" was first performed live during her debut appearance as a musical guest on Saturday Night Live (SNL) on November 2, 2024. In the months leading up to the song's release, Roan teased the track through billboards seen across the United States. On March 13, Roan also released an infomercial-style lyric video for the song, conceptualized by her creative director Ramisha Sattar.

Written by Roan and producer Dan Nigro, the song features traditional country instrumentation, including a fiddle, while parodying conventional country lyrical norms by candidly talking about lesbian intimacy. Although Roan named "Save a Horse (Ride a Cowboy)" by Big & Rich and "Chattahoochee" by Alan Jackson as influences for the song, various music critics compared "The Giver" to the music of the Chicks and Shania Twain.

== Background and composition ==
"The Giver" marks a departure for Chappell Roan into the country music genre, with critics describing the song as country and country pop. The song incorporates traditional country instrumentation, including a fiddle, while subverting conventional lyrical themes with queer storytelling. Roan collaborated with producer Dan Nigro on the writing process, emphasizing a piano-driven approach to establish the song's structure before focusing on production.

In the key of B mixoldyian (sharing the same note as E major) and at a tempo of 93 beats per minute, her vocals in the song span from F♯_{3} (lowest note) to E_{5} (highest note). While the song stays in a 4/4 time signature, it opens with a 3/4 intro at 94 BPM. Following the intro, the track sits into a steady 4/4 meter at a slightly slower tempo of 93 BPM.

In an interview with Amazon Music, she explained that she found the idea of writing a lesbian country song amusing, but she did not intend to "invade" the genre or bait its usual audience to listen to her songs. She found the genre nostalgic and freeing. However, she further explained that her upbringing as a closeted lesbian in Missouri who was taught to hate her own sexuality or "pray it away" influenced the song. "I love myself so much that I took a leap into a pretty painful part of my past in the Midwest and made a song of joy," she shared.

== Promotion and release ==
The song was first performed live during Roan's debut appearance on Saturday Night Live (SNL) hosted by comedian John Mulaney on November 2, 2024. Ahead of the release, she teased the song during a question and answer session at the Grammy Museum, where she described the writing process as an opportunity to reconnect with her roots. Roan hinted at the song and its thematic departure from her earlier work through social media posts, suggesting the beginning of a new era in her career. Nigro revealed that preparing the song involved extensive research and a creative exploration of country music tropes, though he refrained from detailing specific influences. The single's official release was highly anticipated following the positive reception of the live debut.

On SNL, "The Giver" was presented as a brand-new song following her performance of "Pink Pony Club" from her 2023 debut album, The Rise and Fall of a Midwest Princess. The live debut featured an elaborate stage setup and her characteristic drag-inspired aesthetic.

In the months leading up to the song's release, Roan teased the track through billboards seen across the United States, in which she appeared dressed as various career women with the hotline number 620-HOT-TO-GO. On March 13, 2025, she released "The Giver" as a single. The following day, on March 14, she also released an infomercial-style lyric video for the song conceptualized by her creative director, Ramisha Sattar, featuring Roan as a range of professions, such as a construction worker ("she can fix you"), a detective ("I know what you are"), and a lawyer ("you'll love my briefs"). The lyrics of the song appear on-screen, following Roan's various professions.

== Critical reception ==
Professional ratings
Review scores
Source	Rating
Clash	9/10
The Guardian	4/5 stars

The song received widespread critical acclaim. Robin Murray of Clash gave "The Giver" a score of 9 out of 10, hailing it as "breathlessly entertaining" country-pop. He praised the song for its glossy production, while maintaining Roan's brassy, bold essence. Meanwhile, Laura Snapes of The Guardian gave the song four stars out of five. She called it "riotous good fun", comparing it to The Chicks' hit songs from the 1990s. Meanwhile, Walden Green of Pitchfork compared "The Giver" to Shania Twain's music. He commended Nigro's production on the song, which he said "chugs like a train and revs like a pickup truck", though he lamented the absence of Roan's ad-lib during her SNL performance of the song ("Only a woman knows how to treat a woman right") in the final product.

Autostraddle writer Kayla Kumari Upadhyaya echoed Snapes and Green's comparisons of "The Giver" to the music of The Chicks and Shania Twain. She noted that the lyrics were extremely candid about intimacy, praising the song for its direct, overt approach towards lesbian sex. Upadhyaya also lauded Sattar, adding that "we should be talking about Ramisha's work every time we talk about Chappell's artistry." She concluded, "Not a single part of ["The Giver"] is subtle, and that's why I instantly love it," commending Roan for taking "big swings" in her art. Likewise, Vulture's Justin Curto wrote that Roan sounded like a young Natalie Maines in "The Giver" and that the song "sounds like a lesbian Shania Twain single".

Critics responded to "The Giver" with commentary on its impact within the country music landscape. USA Today identified it as part of a growing movement of queer country music, highlighting how it challenges traditional norms in the genre. The song's lyrics and Roan's SNL performance were noted for their assertive and direct address of queer themes, positioning the track among modern LGBTQ+ country anthems. Critics highlighted Roan's use of humor and assertiveness as distinctive within the genre.

The performance on SNL drew attention for its blend of retro Western visuals and modern thematic content. Commentators have situated "The Giver" within a broader trend of increasing LGBTQ+ representation in country music, likening Roan's efforts to those of artists such as Brandi Carlile and Orville Peck.

== Live performances ==
The debut of "The Giver" on SNL included a visually distinct performance featuring Roan with an all-female band, dressed in Western-inspired denim and gingham attire. The performance was characterized by spoken word interjections where Roan addressed the audience directly. Critics described the performance as vibrant and reflective of her theatrical style.

== Commercial performance ==
"The Giver" debuted at number five on the Billboard Hot 100, becoming Roan's third top-ten single and her first top-40 debut. The song accumulated 22.3 million streams, 6,000 downloads, and 2.2 million in radio audience impressions in its first full charting week. The song also debuted atop the Hot Country Songs chart, making Roan the third woman to have their first entry on that chart debut at number one. She follows Beyoncé with "Texas Hold 'Em" (2024) and Bebe Rexha with "Meant to Be" featuring Florida Georgia Line (2017). After previously spending seven weeks on the Hot 100, it re-entered the chart at number 43 during the July 12, 2025 issue before the shipments of the vinyls released for the song.

In the United Kingdom, "The Giver" debuted at number two on the UK Singles Chart on March 21, 2025, for the week ending date March 27, 2025 – becoming Roan's fourth top ten song, and first top ten debut song, in Britain.

== Personnel ==
Credits are adapted from Tidal.

=== Musicians ===
- Chappell Roan – vocals
- Dan Nigro – background vocals, keyboard, guitar, percussion
- Lily Elise – background vocals
- Wes Hightower – background vocals
- Jonathan Wilson – banjo
- Ryan Linvill – bass
- Sterling Laws – drum kit
- Paul Cartwright – strings

=== Technical ===
- Dan Nigro – production, recording, drum programming
- Randy Merrill – mastering
- Mitch McCarthy – mixing

== Charts ==
=== Weekly charts ===
Weekly chart performance for "The Giver"
Chart (2025)	Peak position
Australia (ARIA)	14
Austria (Ö3 Austria Top 40)	40
Belgium (Ultratop 50 Flanders)	16
Canada Hot 100 (Billboard)	10
Canada Country (Billboard)	43
Canada CHR/Top 40 (Billboard)	33
Colombia Anglo Airplay (Monitor Latino)	13
Croatia International Airplay (Top lista)	28
Estonia Airplay (TopHit)	64
Germany (GfK)	64
Global 200 (Billboard)	10
Greece International (IFPI)	97
Iceland (Tónlistinn)	29
Ireland (IRMA)	5
Japan Hot Overseas (Billboard Japan)	3
Lithuania Airplay (TopHit)	50
Netherlands (Dutch Top 40)	22
Netherlands (Single Top 100)	67
New Zealand (Recorded Music NZ)	14
Philippines (Philippines Hot 100)	97
Portugal Airplay (AFP)	51
Romania Airplay (TopHit)	111
Sweden (Sverigetopplistan)	52
Sweden Airplay (Radiomonitor)	47
Switzerland (Schweizer Hitparade)	96
UK Singles (Official Charts)	2
Uruguay Anglo Airplay (Monitor Latino)	10
US Billboard Hot 100	5
US Adult Pop Airplay (Billboard)	32
US Country Airplay (Billboard)	60
US Hot Country Songs (Billboard)	1
US Pop Airplay (Billboard)	27
Venezuela Anglo Airplay (Monitor Latino)	6

=== Monthly charts ===
Monthly chart performance for "The Giver"
Chart (2025)	Peak position
Lithuania Airplay (TopHit)	73

=== Year-end charts ===
Year-end chart performance for "The Giver"
Chart (2025)	Position
Argentina Anglo Airplay (Monitor Latino)	49
Belgium (Ultratop 50 Flanders)	75
Iceland (Tónlistinn)	97
Netherlands (Dutch Top 40)	79
US Hot Country Songs (Billboard)	55

== Certifications ==
Certifications for "The Giver"
Region	Certification	Certified units/sales
Brazil (Pro-Música Brasil)	Gold	20,000^{‡}
New Zealand (RMNZ)	Gold	15,000^{‡}
United Kingdom (BPI)	Gold	400,000^{‡}
United States (RIAA)	Gold	500,000^{‡}
^{‡} Sales+streaming figures based on certification alone.

== Release history ==
Release dates and format(s) for "The Giver"
Region	Date	Format(s)	Label	Ref.
Various	March 13, 2025	Digital download; streaming	Amusement; Island	
United States	March 14, 2025	Country radio	MCA Nashville	
Various	June 27, 2025	7-inch single	Amusement; Island	

== See also ==
- LGBTQ representation in country music
