= Ramisha Sattar =

American visual artist and animator

- Born: September 18, 1999 (age 26); Nebraska, U.S.
- Other name: Misha Spice
- Education: University of Texas at Dallas (BA)
- Occupations: Artist; graphic designer; animator; creative director
- Years active: 2021–present
- Website: ramishasattar.com

Ramisha Sattar (born September 18, 1999) is an American visual artist and animator best known for her work as creative director for American singer-songwriter Chappell Roan. She is also the director of design for astrologer Chani Nicholas's application CHANI.

== Early and personal life ==
Sattar was born on September 18, 1999, and raised in rural Nebraska. Her family moved to Dallas, Texas, during her sophomore year of high school. She is currently based in Los Angeles. She is of Pakistani descent.

== Career ==
Sattar graduated from University of Texas at Dallas in 2021 with a Bachelors of the Arts in Arts, Technology, and Emerging Communication. She majored in design and production, learning about coding, user experience, and user interface among traditional art and design classes.

As a digital designer, Sattar also has experience in printmaking and has always been drawn to scrapbooking. Her work often resembles elements of crafty or hand-made items. This stylistic choice derives from her love for charming homemade items. She also takes inspiration from her personal culture, combining desi elements with her Midwest culture and experimenting with physical collage in digital editing programs. These influences can be seen throughout her work, especially in her merchandise designs for Chappell Roan.

=== Work with Chappell Roan ===
Before officially working for Chappell Roan, Sattar began designing merchandise for the pop star. Then, she came on as a Wardrobe Assistant for the music videos, "Casual" and "My Kink is Karma". Afterwards, she officially joined the team as creative director for Chappell Roan in March 2022. In September 2022, the two made a joint Twitter account, discussing their love for creativity, the arts, and pop culture.

Sattar described her work with Roan to The Guardian as "not only on [Roan's] album packaging but also her merchandise, marketing, stage concepts and more". In an interview with Rolling Stone, Roan recalls bringing her on while she began her career as an independent artist. She describes the connection they made, sharing a taste for audacious art and bonding over their love for drag. To CNN, Roan stated: "She is just as much Chappell Roan as I am, honestly. She is Chappell Roan too." She joined Roan as her companion at the 67th Annual Grammy Awards.

Sattar and Roan designed the packaging for Roan's 2023 debut album The Rise and Fall of a Midwest Princess. Exclusive Editions of the Album feature an embossed, cut-out theater, framing the original vinyl cover, and an interactive paper doll kit, which can be used with the framed stage. This edition was submitted for consideration for Best Packaging at the 67th Annual Grammy Awards.

The most widespread pieces in Sattar's portfolio include the Midwest Princess flash tattoos, the silver sequin typeface on the "Good Luck, Babe" vinyl, and additional illustration assets for the Midwest Princess merchandise. Her cap design for the album merchandise inspired a hat made for the Kamala Harris 2024 presidential campaign. The Democratic National Committee's Director of Strategic Planning for Mobilization, Hester Leyser, took to social media to confirm the design's resemblance and intent.

When Roan toured in 2024 and 2025, Sattar helped design her stage presence and was the animator for her stage visuals at festivals like Coachella, Lollapalooza and the Governors Ball Music Festival.

Sattar has contributed to several of Roan's music videos. Alongside her work in "My Kink is Karma" and "Casual", she also served as the creative director for the "Magician's Cut" video of Roan's 2023 single "Red Wine Supernova". She conceptualized the infomercial-style music video for Roan's 2025 single "The Giver" in addition to the packaging, advertisements, and merchandise.

=== Other work ===
The first professional work that Sattar did was for the online teen magazine, Rookie. Contributing illustration assets alongside other artistic peers, she considers this the beginning of her creative career. She began working at CHANI in December 2020 as the Director of Design in December 2020, while attending the University of Texas at Dallas. She still contributes to the visual branding today.

Sattar recently partnered with Pinterest for a pop-up at Coachella 2025, creating a collage-inspired immersive space, where attendees could create their own collages. In August 2025, Sattar was the creative director for American singer-songwriter Rhea Raj's music video "Mumbai".
