= Australian Military Court =

Former military service tribunal abolished by the High Court of Australia in 2009

The Australian Military Court (AMC) was a military service tribunal established in 2007 with the primary aim of maintaining military justice within the Australian Defence Force. In August 2009, the High Court of Australia ruled that the AMC was unconstitutional according to the Constitution of Australia, putting the 171 cases the court had tried in doubt. In May 2010, the Australian Government announced a new Military Court of Australia (MCA) to replace the provisional system established after the dissolution of the AMC and to provide an appropriate military judiciary for the Australian Defence Force.

== Establishment ==
The Australian Military Court was created when the Parliament of Australia passed the Defence Legislation Amendment Bill 2006, adding Section 114 to the Defence Force Discipline Act 1982, and commenced on 1 October 2007. It replaced the previous systems of individually convened trial by court-martial or defence force magistrate.

== Structure ==
The Australian Military Court consisted of a Chief Military Judge, two permanent Military Judges, and a part-time panel of reserve Military Judges. The first Chief Military Judge was Brigadier Ian Westwood, who was sworn in with the two Permanent Military Judges (Colonel Peter Morrison and Lieutenant Colonel Jennifer Woodward) on 1 October 2007.

Depending on the nature and severity of the offence, the Defence Force Discipline Act made provision for cases to be tried before a single judge, or in more serious cases (such as those committed in the face of the enemy, mutiny, desertion or commanding a Service offence), a jury. Although based in Canberra, the AMC was able to conduct trials anywhere in Australian territories and overseas in operational areas where Australian forces were serving.

== High Court challenge ==
The constitutional validity of the Australian Military Court was successfully challenged in the High Court of Australia by a former Royal Australian Navy Leading Seaman, in the case Lane v Morrison commencing on 16 January 2009.

In August 2005, the sailor and three other military personnel were on a recruitment drive in the Queensland town of Roma. After a game of golf and consumption of a quantity of beer, he was alleged to have "tea-bagged" a sergeant from the Australian Army, that is, placed his testicles on the man's forehead as he slept in a motel bed. Two years later, the Navy charged him with indecent assault on a superior officer, and he was scheduled to be tried before the Australian Military Court on 25 March 2008.

On 26 August 2009, the High Court ruled that the Australian Military Court was not a Chapter III Court for the purposes of the Constitution of Australia, and that the legislation creating it was invalid as it was a court of record which "[was] to exercise the judicial power of the commonwealth" by making binding and authoritative judgements independent of the Australian Defence Force chain of command.

== Proposed Military Court of Australia ==
On 24 May 2010 the Australian Federal Government through the Attorney-General Robert McClelland and Defence Minister John Faulkner announced a proposal for a new Military Court of Australia, to replace the interim measures put in place after the High Court invalidated the Australian Military Court in 2008.

The court would have been independent of the military, with all court appointees having either past military experience or knowledge of the services. Faulkner stated that the proposed new specialist court would deliver "a system of military justice for ADF members that combines the necessary independence and constitutional protections for the judiciary with an understanding of the vital importance of military discipline in the operation of our armed forces. "Timely and fair trials in the new court will enhance military justice and promote discipline in the ADF, which in turn will contribute to improved morale and operational effectiveness.

While judicial officers with knowledge of the military system are necessary, they may not be currently serving Defence Force or Reserve members. McClelland says these measures will ensure the court remains independent. "Judicial officers appointed to the new Military Court of Australia will have the same independence and constitutional protections that apply in other federal courts", he said.

A bill setting out the shape and structure of the court was introduced to Parliament in 2012.

The bill lapsed with the prorogation of Parliament for the 2013 Australian federal election and has not been reintroduced. In the absence of a military court, the current military justice system involves the use of courts martial and "Defence Force Magistrate" trials.
