= John Logan (judge) =

Australian judge

The Honourable Justice John Logan AM RFD SC

Judge of the Federal Court of Australia
- In office 27 September 2007 – 5 March 2026

President of the Defence Force Discipline Appeal Tribunal
- Incumbent
- Assumed office 27 September 2018

Member of the Defence Force Discipline Appeal Tribunal
- In office 1 September 2011 – 26 September 2018

Deputy President of the Administrative Appeals Tribunal
- Incumbent
- Assumed office 23 November 2014

Judge of the Supreme and National Courts of Papua New Guinea
- Incumbent
- Assumed office 5 September 2011

Personal details
- Born: John Alexander Logan; 6 March 1956 (age 70) Brisbane, Australia
- Education: University of Queensland
- Profession: Australian lawyer and judge

John Alexander Logan AM, RFD SC (born 6 March 1956) was a judge of the Federal Court of Australia, President of the Defence Force Discipline Appeal Tribunal, a Deputy President of the Administrative Appeals Tribunal and judge of the Supreme and National Courts of Papua New Guinea.

== Early life and education ==
John Logan commenced at Brisbane Grammar School in January 1968, graduating in 1972, and then attended the University of Queensland graduating with a Bachelor of Economics and a Bachelor of Laws.

== Legal career ==
Logan was admitted to the Queensland Bar in 1980 began his legal career in the Commonwealth Crown Solicitor's office in Brisbane where he became the Principal Legal Officer in charge of the Prosecutions Section. He later commenced private practice at the Queensland Bar in 1984, and was appointed Senior Counsel in 1999.

Logan was appointed a Judge of the Federal Court of Australia on 27 September 2007. He is the President of the Defence Force Discipline Appeal Tribunal (formerly a member of the Tribunal from 1 September 2011), a Deputy President of the Administrative Appeals Tribunal, and a Judge of the Supreme and National Courts of Papua New Guinea. He also serves a member on the board of directors of the Papua New Guinea Centre for Judicial Excellence.

He was appointed a Member of the Order of Australia in the 2026 Australia Day Honours for "significant service to the judiciary and to the law".

== See also ==
- List of Judges of the Federal Court of Australia
