= James Chin Moody =

Australian businessman and academic

- Born: James Bradfield Moody; 1976 (age 49–50)
- Education: Queensland University of Technology, Australian National University
- Occupation: CEO of Sendle

James Chin Moody (born James Bradfield Moody in 1976) is the CEO of Sendle, an Australian package delivery company he co-founded in 2014. Moody was previously Executive Director, Development at the Commonwealth Scientific and Industrial Research Organisation. He was also a panel member on the ABC television show The New Inventors and co-author of The Sixth Wave: How to Succeed in a Resource-Limited World with Bianca Nogrady.

== Early life and education ==
Moody attended high school at Brisbane Grammar School. After high school, Moody gained a bachelor's degree in electrical and electronic systems engineering, and a bachelor of information technology, from the Queensland University of Technology. Moody completed his doctor of philosophy in business administration and innovation in 2004 at the Australian National University for research into complex product systems in the Australian national innovation system focusing on the space industry.

== Career ==
From 1999 to 2001, Moody was responsible for systems engineering of Fedsat, the first Australian satellite to be launched in thirty years, funded by the Cooperative Research Centre for Satellite Systems. This included working with UK firm Space Innovations Ltd who were sub-contracted to build the satellite bus and assisting in transferring the technology back to Australia.

From 2001 to 2003, Moody was the managing director of natural resource intelligence, a spatial information company, and part of the natural intelligence (NAI) group. NAI was reborn in 2004 as Commoditel, and again as ComTel.

From 2000 to 2002, Moody was co-facilitator and Australian representative of the youth advisory council to the United Nations Environment Program. He was also a founder and co-chair of the Space Generation Advisory Council in support of the UN Programme on Space Applications, a group of students and young space professionals. he was also a member of the Science and Technology delegation to the UN World Summit on Sustainable Development in 2002, was a member and executive secretary of the taskforce on Science and Technology for the Millennium Development Goals and was invited to attend the World Economic Forum as a Global Leader of Tomorrow in 2003 and Young Global Leader in 2005.

From 2004 to 2009, Moody held various roles at CSIRO including general manager, government and international; general manager, international; and director, divisional business strategy for the division of land and water.

Moody also sits on the board of the Brisbane Institute, the Advisory Council of the Australian Bureau of Statistics and is an Australian National Commissioner for UNESCO. He has previously sat on the boards of the National Australia Day Council, the Advisory Board of the Bureau of Meteorology and the Australian Spatial Information Business Association. He was also previously a member of the Federal Government's National Environmental Education Council and President of Young Engineers Australia.

In 2014, Moody co-founded a courier service company, Sendle with Sean Geoghegan and Craig Davis.

In 2010, The Sixth Wave, a book on how to succeed in a resource-limited world, written by Moody with Bianca Nogrady was published by Random House.

== Honours ==
In 2000, Moody was named Young Professional Engineer of the Year and in 2005 was named one of the 100 most influential engineers in Australia. While holding this title he promoted the engineering profession and his particular brand of ‘socially conscious engineering’. In 2000 Moody was also awarded Young Queenslander of the Year and in 2001 was a finalist in the Young Australian of the Year awards, in the Science and Technology category.

== Personal life ==
Moody is married to Geraldine Chin Moody and lives in Sydney. They have two sons.
