= Australasian Agricultural and Resource Economics Society =

Australian professional association

The Australasian Agricultural and Resource Economics Society is an Australian professional association. It describes itself as "independent association of persons and organisations interested in agricultural, resource and environmental economics".

The Society, then called the Australian Agricultural Economics Society was founded at a conference convened in Sydney in February 1957, following a proposal by J.R. Currie, foundation secretary of the International Association of Agricultural Economists. In 1995 the Society determined to change its original name to that of the Australian Agricultural and Resource Economics Society. In February 2017 the Society changed its name again to the Australasian Agricultural and Resource Economics Society.

The Society publishes an academic journal, the Australian Journal of Agricultural and Resource Economics. Until 1996, when it was combined with the Review of Marketing and Agricultural Economics, the journal was called the Australian Journal of Agricultural Economics.
