= Sendle =

Australian package delivery company

- Type: Private
- Industry: Logistics
- Founded: 2014
- Founders: James Bradfield Moody, Sean Geoghegan, Craig Davis.
- Headquarters: Sydney, Australia
- Area served: Australia, United States, Canada
- Services: Parcel and package delivery
- Website: www.sendle.com

Sendle is an Australian-based virtual courier company which provides courier services within Australia, the United States, and Canada, focusing primarily on small to medium-sized businesses and online retailers. It claims to be the first courier company to offer fully carbon neutral services in Australia, the United States and Canada. While its delivery services are worldwide — with the exception of Russia and Belarus — its operational staff are based in Australia, New Zealand, the Philippines and the United States. Sendle does not employ drivers or operate its own delivery fleet; instead, it partners with local courier companies to transport parcels within its coverage areas.

In January 2026, Sendle's parent company FAST Group announced that it would cease operations, closing Sendle in the process. Sendle entered liquidation in February 2026. The company's branding was acquired by McKenna Worldwide in July 2026, and the website resumed operation in October 2026.

== History ==
The company was founded in 2014 by James Bradfield Moody, Sean Geoghegan and Craig Davis. In 2015, Sendle announced that it had become Australia's first carbon neutral delivery service.

In 2015, Australia Post filed a trademark dispute against Sendle for its slogan “Post without the office”. In 2017, IP Australia ruled in Sendle’s favour, allowing the company to use the trademark and slogan.

In August 2016, Sendle said that it had surpassed 100 million kilometres in its deliveries and that it had raised A$5 million for further expansion. The company won the 2016 NSW Telstra Business Award in the new business category.

In 2017, Sendle announced an agreement with DHL eCommerce to facilitate international deliveries from Australia, and a systems integration with e-commerce companies eBay, Shopify, Shipstation, WooCommerce and Xero to streamline order handling. In 2018, the company said that it was partnering with eBay and had become one of their delivery partners.

In 2019, Sendle raised A$20 million in capital and expanded to the United States. Amid a rise in demand due to the COVID-19 pandemic, the company raised A$19 million in funding. In 2021, Sendle raised A$45 million in Series C funding and, in 2022, the company expanded to Canada. It raised a further A$16 million in 2024.

In August 2025, the company announced that Sendle and US companies ACI Logistix and FastMile would merge to form FAST Group. The three companies would continue to operate independently and Moody would continue as CEO of Sendle.

In December 2025, Federation AM notified investors via email that it was suspending redemptions from its Fund II—a vehicle targeting 20% annualized returns over five years. The fund, which held about 64% of its capital in FAST Group, cited “significant deficiencies” in ACI Logistix’s financial statements discovered post-merger. Questions arose about the accuracy of information disclosed during due diligence, prompting Federation’s deal team to scrutinize the acquisition process.

On 11 January 2026, Sendle stopped accepting new packages as it closed down Australian and Canadian operations, with both of those website locales displaying a prominent banner stating "As of January 11 2026, Sendle will be halting all bookings for parcel pickup and delivery." The next day, the FAST Group board voted to cease operations, resulting in Sendle's imminent closure. A timeline for winding up was not provided.

On February 25 2026, Sendle entered creditors' voluntary liquidation, with documents filed to the Australian Securities & Investments Commission showing Shaun Fraser and Jason Preston of McGrathNicol appointed as liquidators.

In July 2026, Sendle's branding, trademark and domain name was acquired by the logistics firm McKenna Worldwide for an undisclosed amount. The deal did not include the company itself or any of its debt obligations. The website resumed operation in October 2026.
