= Shag Rock (band) =

Australian indie rock band

- Origin: Brisbane, Queensland, Australia
- Genre: Indie rock
- Years active: 2011–present
- Label: Airlock Records (2015–present)
- Members: Jacob Reed; Alex Wilson; Nick Cavdarski
- Past members: Chris Dudurovic; Max Rose; Max Beech; Tayla Young
- Website: www.shagrockmusic.com

Shag Rock are an Australian indie-rock group formed in 2011.

== History ==
Shag Rock was formed in 2011, though according to the band themselves, began being "serious" in 2015. The group's name refers to a rock off North Stradbroke Island, where they went frequently growing up.

In early 2015, Shag Rock were signed to the independent label Airlock Records, founded by Powderfinger's Ian Haug and in April 2015, released their debut self-titled EP. In 2025, "Champagne" from that EP was certified Gold by the Australian Recording Industry Association (ARIA).

In 2016, Shag Rock released the singles "Roadtrip" and "Sunbleached Girl" ahead of their debut studio album Barefoot in February 2017.

In 2021, Tayla Young joined the group. In July 2021, Shag Rock released their second studio album Double Overhead to which Jacob Reed said it “explores mental health, which hopefully encourages people to be in touch with their feelings, chat to their mates and normalise being emotionally vulnerable It was nominated for Queensland Album of the Year in 2022.

In July 2023, Shag Rock released "Zero G's"

== Members ==
List of group members:

Current members

- Jacob Reed – vocal, guitar and keys
- Alex Wilson – vocals, lead guitar and guitar
- Nick Cavdarski – bass and guitar

Former members

- Chris Dudurovic (until 2015) – keyboards
- Max Rose (until 2015) - drums
- Max Beech(until 2024) - drums
- Tayla Young (until 2023) – vocals

== Discography ==
=== Albums ===
List of albums, with release date and label shown
Title	Details
Barefoot	Released: 10 February 2017; Label: Airlock Records (AIRLOCK014); Formats: digital download, streaming
Double Overhead	Released: 9 July 2021; Label: Airlock Records; Formats: digital download, streaming
Three Deep Breaths	Released: 23 October 2026; Label: Shag Rock (9362531690046); Formats: digital download, streaming

=== Extended plays ===
List of EPs with release date and label shown
Title	Details
Shag Rock	Released: April 2015; Label: Airlock Records (AIRLOCK02); Formats: CD digital download, streaming

=== Certified singles ===
List of singles, with year released year and certifications
Title	Year	Certifications	Album
"Champagne"	2015	ARIA: Gold	Shag Rock
"Sunbleached Girl"	2016	ARIA: Platinum	Barefoot
