= Australian Bureau of Agricultural and Resource Economics and Sciences =

Government research agency

Agency overview
- Formed: 21 August 1945; 80 years ago
- Preceding agency: Bureau of Agricultural Economics
- Headquarters: Canberra, Australian Capital Territory
- Agency executive: Dr Jared Greenville, Executive Director
- Parent department: Department of Agriculture, Fisheries and Forestry
- Website: agriculture.gov.au/abares

The Australian Bureau of Agricultural and Resource Economics and Sciences (ABARES) is a federal research branch of the Australian Government Department of Agriculture, Fisheries and Forestry, located in Canberra, Australia. ABARES was established on 21 August 1945 as the Bureau of Agricultural Economics (BAE), and is also involved in commercial consultancy. It was merged with the Bureau of Rural Sciences (BRS) in 2010. The main role of ABARES is to provide "professionally independent data, research, analysis and advice that informs public and private decisions affecting Australian agriculture, fisheries and forestry". ABARES maintains the AgSurf database which includes farm survey data on farm performance, production benchmarks, farm management, socioeconomic indicators relating to the grains, beef, sheep and dairy industries in Australia. ABARES has received funding from business and industry groups. ABARES' website notes that "Over half of ABARES' external revenue is derived from commercial consulting work."

== History ==
ABARES was founded on the 21st of August 1945 as the Bureau of Agricultural Economics (BAE) with the preliminary purpose of researching the economic potential of primary industries and their efficiency. Initially, the bureau was established to operate within the Ministry of Post-War Reconstruction and was then transferred into the Ministry for Commerce and Agriculture in August 1946. In 1988, the bureau combined with the Bureau of Mineral Resources to become the Australian Bureau of Agricultural and Resource Economics (ABARE) which would further widen the field of research to include energy, minerals markets and issues such as climate change. In 2010, ABARE undertook a further merger with the Bureau of Rural Sciences (BRS) with the goal to grant ABARES the capacity to undertake integrated economic, scientific and social science research. In 1952, the bureau began to undertake frequent review and forecasts of farm survey data. Formal and regular assessments including a wider variety of productivity indicators of Australian agriculture began in the 1980s.

== People ==
ABARES Executive Team
Position	Responsibilities
Executive Director – Dr Jared Greenville	Leading researcher on integrating strategic approaches to natural resource management, sustainability, global change and environmental policy
Assistant Secretary, Agricultural Forecasting and Trade Branch – Kurt Hockey	Trade and biosecurity; Global agriculture and food modelling; Global value chains; Growing Australian agricultural exports; Agricultural outlook; Agricultural macroeconomic analysis; Agricultural commodity transformation; Climate and agronomy; Research and analytics platforms; Data organisation; Data ecosystems; Data interoperability; Emerging policy issues; Conferences and events, strategic communication and publishing
Assistant Secretary, Farm Performance and Information branch – Andrea Willis	Productivity analysis; Climate and price variability; Farm surveys management; Farm surveys policy insights analysis; Climate change and the profitability of Australian farms; Seasonal agricultural labour demand; Information systems management
Assistant Secretary – Natural Resources Branch – David Galeano	Spatial analytics.; Forest and land information; Forest and land synthesis and reporting; Natural resources market measurement; Natural resources trends and drivers; Natural resources policy insights; Fisheries economics; Domestic fisheries; International fisheries; Socio-economic fish survey
ABARES Chief Biosecurity Scientist – Biosecurity Research and Analysis Branch - Dr Tony Arthur	Invasive species; Social sciences; Biosecurity modelling; Biosecurity risk management; Biosecurity value; Marine pests research

ABARES is under the direct leadership of several federal Ministers which include:

ABARES Federal ministers
Department	Minister
Minister for Agriculture, Fisheries and Forestry	Julie Collins
Assistant Minister for Agriculture, Fisheries and Forestry	Anthony Chisholm

In 1948, ABARES had 25 professional staff with university degrees in economics or agricultural economics, and this number grew to 55 in 1954 than to 85 in 1962. During the 1970s ABARES' employee count had risen to 200 with special qualifications in economics. In the 1980s when the then ABARE merged with the Bureau of Mineral Resources to become ABARES, the total employee count peaked at just above 300, from the 1980s the employee count of ABARES declined to roughly 125 employees as of 2017–18.

== Data collection, processes and procedures ==
ABARES collects a broad range of commodity, climate and agricultural data. The data ABARES collects is the chief source of publicly available data for Australian agricultural and resource economics related commodities and industries, and has been described as more accurate in these fields than other organisations. ABARES' surveys are sometimes collected via face-to-face interviews. Compared with other national agricultural and resource economics data collection agencies, ABARES is considered one of the more reliable and thorough. While ABARES does collate and produce reports exclusively within ABARES, often, ABARES will co-produce reports and documents with industry groups. By working collaboratively, the advice ABARES and the private entity provide will be received more effectively than information provided solely by ABARES or a private entity.

ABARES collates three annual agricultural surveys which includes:

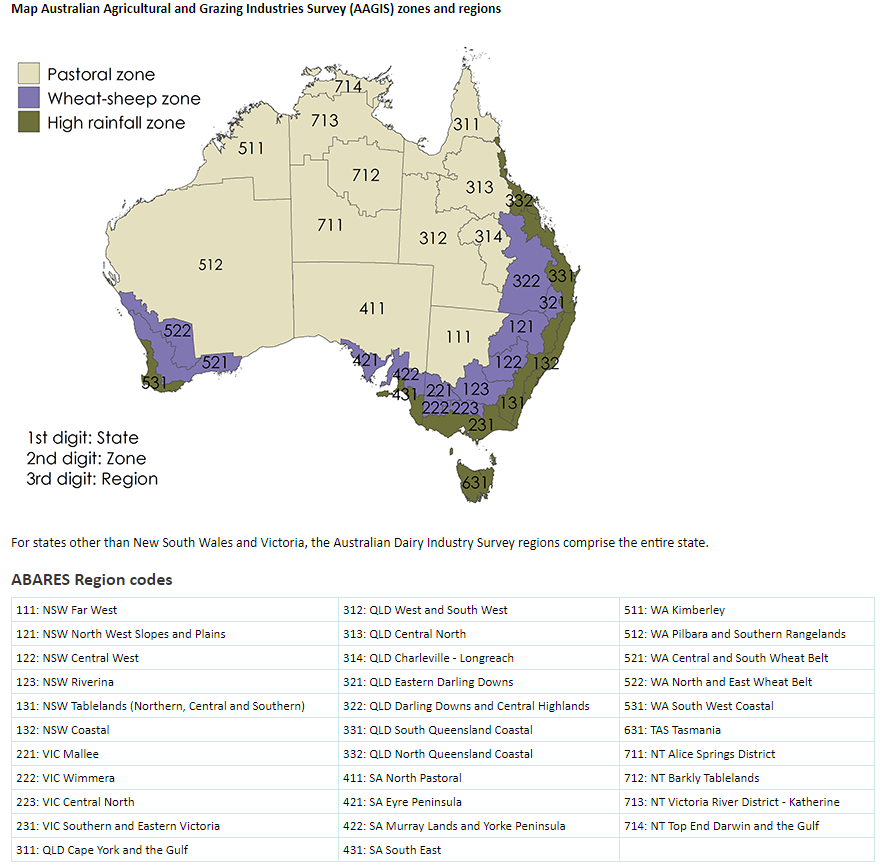
Map of Australian Agricultural and Grazing Industries Survey (AAGIS) zones and regions

- The Australian Agricultural and Grazing Industry Survey (AAGIS)
- Australian Dairy Industry Survey (ADI)
- Murray-Darling Basin Irrigation Survey

The Australian Agricultural and Grazing Industry Survey (AAGIS) is a large report compiled by ABARES which assesses broadacre industries on a yearly basis. ABARES determines the target number and types of farms to include in the AAGIS survey. To do this, ABARES collects data on farms that participated in the survey in the previous year (and would like to participate in the current year) and then resample the remaining population to reach the target number and composition. Furthermore, the data collected within the AAGIS survey is split into various zones as to aid consistent data interpretation.

The ADI survey covers farms that are engaged in dairying. Australia's Dairy industry is the third largest rural industry behind wheat and beef and has a gross value of $4 billion.

The Murray-Darling Basin Irrigation Survey covers a broad range of industries and subindustries. The gross revenue from agriculture in the basin was $13.6 billion in 2000–01, of which $4.6 billion was estimated to be derived from irrigation. Irrigated agriculture is practiced on about 15 000 different farming properties throughout the Basin. The three main industries in this survey include Broadacre, Dairy and Horticulture. These are then subdivided into smaller industries to survey data on sheep farming, beef farming, grain growing, rice growing, cotton growing, dairy cattle farming, vegetable growing under cover and outdoors, grape, apple and pear, stone fruit, citrus fruit and other fruit and tree nut growing.

ABARES additionally collaborates with many other Australian government agencies to collect data on specific industries that may overlap with the other agency.

Collaboration name	Agencies involved	Description
Farm-Level Agricultural Dataset (FLAD)	ABS, DAWE and ABARES	In 2019–20, the partnership was undertaken to improve understanding of how drought and climate variability are impacting Australian Farm production. FLAD will enable analysis of changes in agricultural production over time for a wider range of researchers. More broadly, the methods used to incorporate location information will pave the way for understanding how businesses of all types are impacted by a range of nearby physical environment variables e.g. temperature, air quality, or urban infrastructure.
Physical Environment Analysis Network (PEAN)	DAWE, ABARES, ABS, Bureau of Meteorology, CSIRO and Geoscience Australia	PEAN was established in 2017 under the Data Integration Partnership for Australia (DIPA). The main objective of PEAN is to increase the value of the government's scientific and administrative data on the physical environment, agriculture, energy, biodiversity, and on supporting Indigenous aspirations.
National Agricultural Statistics Review (NASR)	ABS and ABARES	NASR was established in 2013 with the objective to consider all aspects of the national agricultural statistical information system and assess its ability to inform decision-making. The review seeks to identify opportunities to improve the system and develop a framework for ongoing assessment, coordination, and governance of information needs into the future.

== Publications ==
The data collected by ABARES is often used for governmental and private sector consulting. Additionally, the data collected by ABARES has been used by independent researchers on several occasions to assist in accurate and reliable reporting. ABARES also produces many forecasts throughout the year, "ABARES regularly prepares forecasts of area, production, and yields for more than twenty winter and summer crops in each Australian State". Among the regular forecasts and reports is a weekly national update, the update covers a range of topic including climate data, key issues, commodity information and water usage.

Forecasting and modelling was widely used in commodity outlook studies, it wasn't until the 1970s these models were applied to agricultural markets. The expanding of these forecasts and models globally allowed ABARES to dedicate more of their resources to publishing these types of models. The 1980s introduction of the Econometric Model of Australian Broadacre Agriculture (EMABA) was one of the first major forecasting models produced by ABARES. Agricultural forecasts are still regularly published with the aim to provide information on expected prices to help ensure that markets operate fairly, and, identify and form policy responses to emerging issues. Additionally, ABARES publishes data on land usage and land occupation which assists in forecasts and modelling.

Through hosting the Annual National Outlook Conference, ABARES has been able to collate annual forecasts of major commodities and quarterly gross values of agricultural production, resources and exports.

During the 2018 Banking Royal Commission, ABARES provided a broad range of data from farm surveys and other public resources to assist the investigation of farm indebtedness. The main publication that was used for the background report was the Regional farm debt: northern Queensland gulf, south west Queensland and north west New South Wales report which was published in December 2014.

Additionally, ABARES publish a number of series, including the Australian quarterly forecast report, Agricultural commodities ISSN 1839-5619, since September 2011).

=== History of Agricultural commodities report ===
The Agricultural commodities title replaced Australian commodities: forecasts and issues ISSN 1321-7844, March 1994 – June 2011), formerly Agriculture and Resources Quarterly ISSN 1032-9722, March 1989 – December 1993).

Agriculture and Resources Quarterly originated from the merging of Resource Trends ISSN 0818-3619, September 1986 – December 1988) and Quarterly review of the rural economy ISSN 0156-7446, February 1979 – December 1988, previously Quarterly review of agricultural economics ISSN 0033-5754, January 1948 – April/July 1978).

== Controversy ==
In February 1998 the Commonwealth Ombudsman produced a report of an investigation into ABARE's external funding of climate change economic modelling. The investigation was instigated after the Australian Conservation Foundation (ACF) sought membership of ABARES' established GIGABARE Steering Committee. ABARES sought a membership fee from ACF which the ACF requested to be waived. After the waiver was declined the ACF then made a formal complaint to the Ombudsman on the basis of:

- ABARES's undisclosed source for research funding,
- ABARES's lack of appropriate guidelines and protocols for private sector funding, where private funded projects informed government decisions, and
- The Steering Committees established by ABARES' were not accessible to organisations without significant financial resources and thus ABARES' role providing assistance and advice would be swayed in favour of business interests.

As a result of the investigation the Ombudsman ruled against ABARES and concluded the GIGABARE committee was constituted by ABARE primarily as a means of raising additional revenue for these projects. As a result of the findings ABARES underwent radical restructuring which aimed to limit the possibility of corrupt or fraudulent behaviour into the future.

== See also ==
- Agricultural economics
- Natural resource economics
