= Connor O'Grady (designer) =

Australian womenswear designer

- Born: 10 October 2000 (age 26); Brisbane, Queensland, Australia
- Education: London College of Fashion
- Label: Connor O'Grady
- Website: www.connorogrady.com

Connor O'Grady (born 10 October 2000 in Brisbane, Australia) is an Australian fashion designer based in London. He is known for sculptural silhouettes, historical and pop culture references, and a focus on craftsmanship.

== Career ==
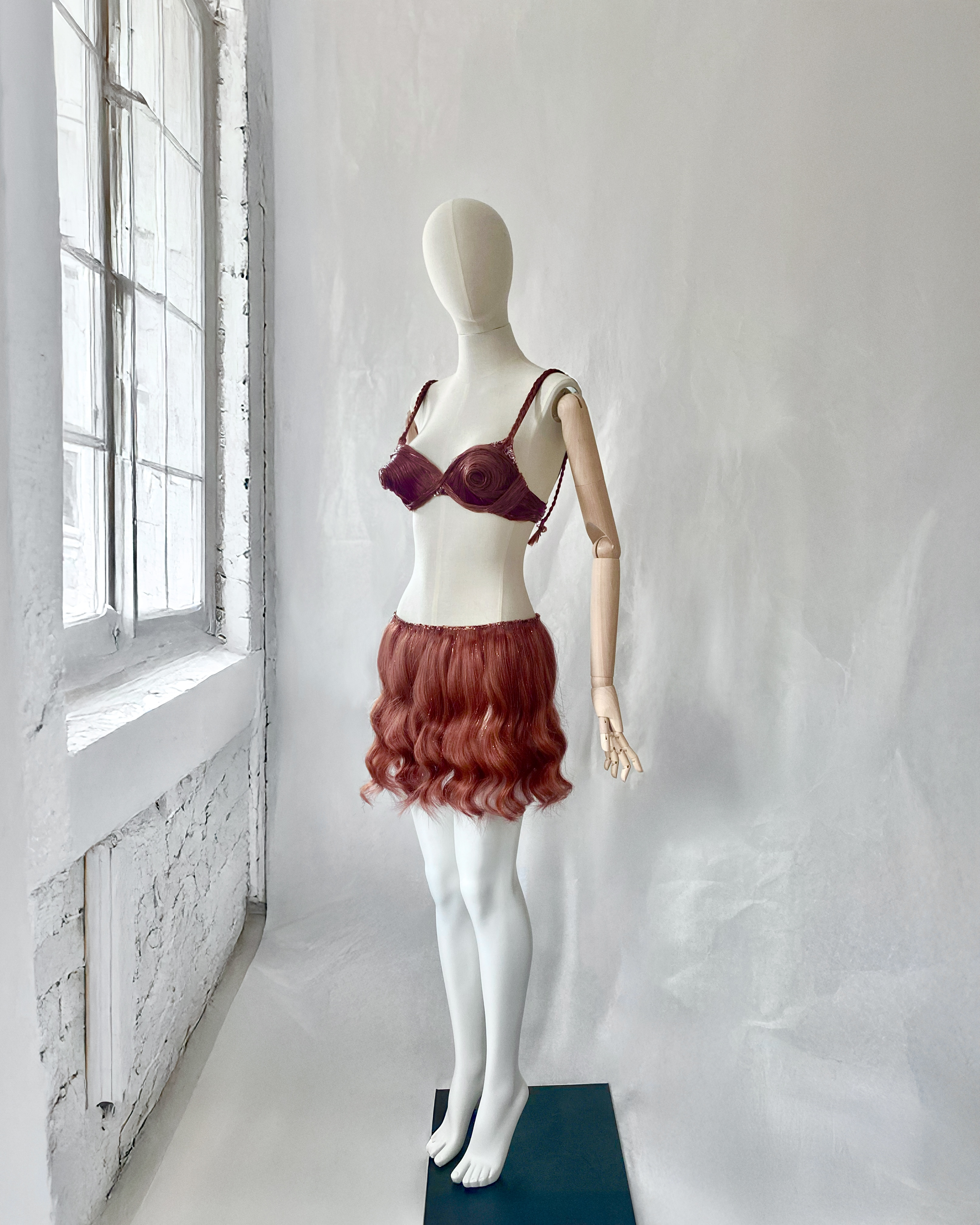
Ensemble designed by O'Grady and worn by Chappell Roan in the music video for 'The Subway' (2025). The look comprises a bra and skirt made from human hair, with crystallised undergarments.

O'Grady graduated from the London College of Fashion in 2023 with a degree in womenswear.

His designs have appeared in international fashion publications including Dazed, SHOWstudio, Vogue, and Acne Paper, where model Alek Wek wore his work. His designs have also been worn by Julia Fox and Adéla, who wore his pieces in an August 2026 Teen Vogue cover story. Earlier in 2026, O'Grady created millinery for Jimmy Choo's bridal campaign featuring model Gabbriette.

In 2025, O'Grady designed a custom ensemble for singer Chappell Roan to wear in the music video for her single "The Subway".

He has been profiled in Vogue Australia and i-D, discussing his design practice and influences. In 2024, he was shortlisted for the British Vogue × BMW Future Creators competition. The following year, he was selected as a Vogue Vanguard designer and invited by Vogue Australia and the Australian Fashion Council to present bespoke pieces at the closing event of Australian Fashion Week 2025.

He was also cited by stylist Genesis Webb in a 2025 Nylon (magazine) feature as one of her favourite emerging designers to watch. That same year, Rain magazine featured his debut collection in an article exploring his inspirations and creative process.

O'Grady first gained attention in 2016, when he won the Australian Wool Fashion Awards at age 15. He was later named the 2018 Australian Young Designer of the Year and Brisbane's 2019 Young Citizen of the Year. His early work was profiled by ABC News in 2018 and previously covered in The Courier-Mail in 2012.
