= Arthur Stanley Roe =

Australian medical doctor

Arthur Roe FRCSE FRACS
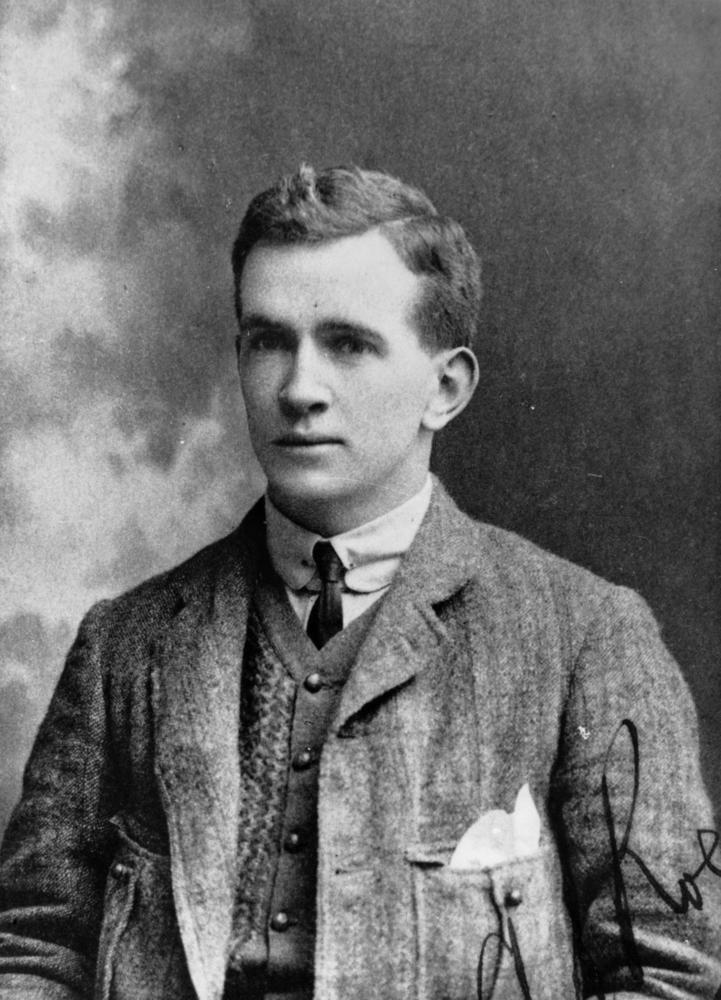
- Born: Arthur Stanley Roe; 16 April 1885; Brisbane, Queensland, Australia
- Died: 16 April 1966 (aged 81)
- Occupation: Medical doctor

Arthur Stanley Roe (16 April 1885 – 19 July 1966) was an Australian medical doctor from Brisbane, and the first Rhodes Scholar from Queensland when he was awarded the scholarship in 1904. Educated at Brisbane Grammar School, he attended Balliol College at Oxford University.

He was the son of Reginald Heber Roe, who was the first vice-chancellor of the University of Queensland, and Annie Maud Whish, daughter of Claudius Buchanan Whish.
