= Tim Caldwell (cricketer) =

Australian cricketer

Tim Caldwell OBE BEM

Personal information
- Full name: Timothy John Charles Caldwell
- Born: 29 October 1913; Clayfield, Brisbane, Queensland, Australia
- Died: 17 June 1994 (aged 80); Orange, New South Wales, Australia
- Batting: Right-handed
- Bowling: Right-armed offbreak fast
- Role: bowler

Domestic team information
- Years: Team
- 1935–1937: New South Wales
- FC debut: 3 December 1921 New South Wales v Queensland
- Last FC: 9 January 1930 New South Wales v South Australia

Tim Charles John Caldwell, OBE, BEM (29 October 1913 – 17 June 1994) was an Australian cricketer who played first-class cricket for New South Wales from 1935 to 1937. He served as Chairman of the Australian Cricket Board from 1972 until 1975 and was a senior executive with the Australia and New Zealand Banking Group.

== Early life ==
Caldwell was born in the Brisbane suburb of Clayfield, Queensland, and educated at Brisbane Grammar School and Newington College (1927–1930). He was a right arm fast medium bowler and right-handed batsman for Northern Districts.

== Banking career ==
On leaving school, Caldwell joined the English, Scottish and Australian Bank and at the time of his retirement was National Assistant general manager, and NSW general manager, of the same organisation, but by then known as the ANZ.

== War service ==
During World War II, Caldwell served in the 9th Australian Division of the AIF and as a Lieutenant was awarded the British Empire Medal.

== Cricket ==
Caldwell played for New South Wales in the Sheffield Shield for three years (1935–1937) and was President of the Northern Districts Cricket Club from 1963 until 1968. He was Chairman of the Australian Cricket Board (1972–1975) during a difficult period of modernisation of the game in Australia.

== Honours ==
- British Empire Medal (1943) – For distinguished military service in the Middle East.
- Officer of the Order of the British Empire (1976) – for services to sport.
- Honorary Life Member – New South Wales Cricket Association
- Honorary Life Member – Marylebone Cricket Club

== See also ==
- List of New South Wales representative cricketers

== Notes ==
Preceded by Sir Donald Bradman	Chairman; Australian Cricket Board; 1972–1975	Succeeded by Bob Parish
