= Defence Force Discipline Act 1982 =

Act of the Parliament of Australia

Parliament of Australia
- Long title: An Act relating to the Discipline of the Defence Force and for related purposes
- Citation: No. 156 of 1982 or No. 156, 1982 as amended
- Territorial extent: States and territories of Australia
- Status: In force

The Defence Force Discipline Act 1982 (Cth) is an Act of the Parliament of Australia, that set the foundation of modern military law in Australia. It governs the Australian Defence Force in its discipline of defence members, powers of service police, rights of defence members, punishment and the Jurisdiction of the Act in regard to State, Territory and Commonwealth law. Section 114, added to the Act in 2007, created

== Amendments ==
The Defence Legislation Amendment Act 2007 amended the Act to create the Australian Military Court, which was later deemed constitutionally invalid.
