= Alex Warren discography =

Discography of American singer Alex Warren

- Warren in 2024
- Studio albums: 2
- EPs: 1
- Singles: 19

American singer-songwriter Alex Warren has released two studio albums, one extended play, and 19 singles. Formerly of the Hype House, Warren began his music career upon the release of his debut single "One More I Love You". Warren signed with Atlantic Records in August 2022, and released his debut major-label single "Headlights" in September 2022. Warren released his debut extended play You'll Be Alright Kid (Chapter 1) in September 2024.

Warren released the single "Ordinary" in February 2025, which gained popularity on TikTok, and peaked at number 1 on the Billboard Hot 100, as well as becoming the longest-running number-one song on the UK Singles Chart in the 2020s. Warren's debut studio album, You'll Be Alright, Kid, was released in June 2025. Within its first day of release, it was certified gold by the Recording Industry Association of America (RIAA), for selling at least 500,000 copies in the United States. It was later certified RIAA platinum and Music Canada 3× platinum. The album debuted at its peak position number 5 on the Billboard 200.

Warren's second studio album, Wildchild, was released on August 28, 2026.

== Studio albums ==
List of studio albums, with selected details, chart positions and certifications
Title	Details	Peak chart positions										Sales	Certifications
Title	Details	US	AUS	BEL (FL)	CAN	IRE	NLD	NOR	NZ	SWE	UK	Sales	Certifications
You'll Be Alright, Kid	Released: July 18, 2025; Label: Atlantic; Formats: Digital download, streaming	5	2	—	3	—	—	1	—	12	—		RIAA: Platinum; MC: 3× Platinum; RMNZ: 4× Platinum
Wildchild	Released: August 28, 2026; Label: Atlantic; Formats: CD, CS, LP, digital download, streaming	2	1	1	3	10	1	5	1	14	1	US: 75,000	
"—" denotes releases that did not chart in that territory.

== Extended plays ==
List of extended plays, with selected details, chart positions and certifications
Title	Details	Peak chart positions										Certifications
Title	Details	US	AUS	BEL (FL)	CAN	IRE	NLD	NOR	NZ	SWE	UK	Certifications
You'll Be Alright, Kid (Chapter 1)	Released: September 27, 2024; Label: Atlantic; Formats: CD, digital download, streaming	13	15	2	3	1	1	1	2	2	1	BPI: Platinum; MC: Gold; NVPI: Diamond

== Singles ==
List of singles, with selected chart positions and certifications, showing year released and album name
Title	Year	Peak chart positions										Certifications	Album
Title	Year	US	AUS	BEL (FL)	CAN	IRE	NLD	NZ	SWE	UK	WW	Certifications	Album
"One More I Love You"	2021	—	—	—	—	—	—	—	—	—	—		Non-album singles
"Screaming Underwater"	2021	—	—	—	—	—	—	—	—	—	—		Non-album singles
"Remember Me Happy"	2021	—	—	—	—	—	—	—	—	—	—		Non-album singles
"Headlights"	2022	—	—	—	—	—	—	—	—	—	—		Non-album singles
"Chasing Shadows"	2022	—	—	—	—	—	—	—	—	—	—	BPI: Silver; MC: Platinum; RMNZ: Gold	You'll Be Alright, Kid (Chapter 1)
"Give You Love"	2023	—	—	—	—	—	—	—	—	—	—		Non-album singles
"Change Your Mind"	2023	—	—	—	—	—	—	—	—	—	—		Non-album singles
"How Could You (Be OK)"	2023	—	—	—	—	—	—	—	—	—	—	MC: Platinum	Non-album singles
"Yard Sale"	2023	—	—	—	—	—	—	—	—	—	—		You'll Be Alright, Kid (Chapter 1)
"Before You Leave Me"	2024	—	—	10	—	41	5	—	34	80	—	RIAA: Gold; ARIA: Platinum; BPI: Platinum; BRMA: Gold; MC: 3× Platinum; NVPI: Platinum; RMNZ: Platinum	You'll Be Alright, Kid (Chapter 1)
"Save You a Seat"	2024	— (Note: "Save You a Seat" did not enter the Billboard Hot 100, but peaked at number 19 on the Bubbling Under Hot 100 chart.)	—	—	—	89	—	—	70	93	—	RIAA: Gold; ARIA: Platinum; BPI: Silver; MC: 2× Platinum; RMNZ: Platinum	You'll Be Alright, Kid (Chapter 1)
"Carry You Home" (solo or featuring Ella Henderson)	2024	— (Note: "Carry You Home" did not enter the Billboard Hot 100, but peaked at number 4 on the Bubbling Under Hot 100 chart.)	20	6	56	7	4	15	46	9	82	RIAA: Platinum; ARIA: 2× Platinum; BPI: 2× Platinum; BRMA: Gold; MC: 5× Platinum; NVPI: Platinum; RMNZ: 3× Platinum	You'll Be Alright, Kid (Chapter 1)
"Troubled Waters"	2024	—	—	—	—	—	—	— (Note: "Troubled Waters" did not enter the NZ Top 40 Singles Chart, but peaked at number 10 on the NZ Hot Singles Chart.)	—	—	—	BPI: Silver; MC: Platinum; RMNZ: Gold	You'll Be Alright, Kid (Chapter 1)
"Burning Down" (solo or featuring Joe Jonas)	2024	69	47	5	44	21	7	31	73	23	136	RIAA: Platinum; ARIA: Platinum; BPI: Platinum; MC: 3× Platinum; NVPI: Platinum; RMNZ: 2× Platinum	You'll Be Alright, Kid (Chapter 1)
"Ordinary"	2025	1	1	1	1	1	1	1	2	1	1	RIAA: 3× Platinum; ARIA: 7× Platinum; BPI: 4× Platinum; MC: Diamond; NVPI: Diamond; RMNZ: 7× Platinum	You'll Be Alright, Kid
"Bloodline" (with Jelly Roll)	2025	32	12	6	17	6	13	7	21	9	19	RIAA: Gold; ARIA: Platinum; BPI: Gold; MC: 3× Platinum; NVPI: Gold; RMNZ: Platinum	You'll Be Alright, Kid
"On My Mind" (with Rosé)	2025	60	91	—	60	53	—	— (Note: "On My Mind" did not enter the NZ Top 40 Singles Chart, but peaked at number 10 on the NZ Hot Singles Chart.)	—	37	57	MC: Gold	You'll Be Alright, Kid
"Eternity"	2025	16	10	3	17	7	5	5	13	3	11	ARIA: Platinum; BPI: Platinum; MC: 2× Platinum; NVPI: Platinum; RMNZ: Platinum	You'll Be Alright, Kid
"Fever Dream"	2026	21	20	1	10	5	1	13	11	3	14	BPI: Platinum; MC: 2× Platinum; RMNZ: Platinum	Wildchild
"Fine Place to Die"	2026	87	84	—	72	41	—	— (Note: "Fine Place to Die" did not enter the NZ Top 40 Singles Chart, but peaked at number 2 on the NZ Hot Singles Chart.)	— (Note: "Fine Place to Die" did not enter the Swedish Singellista Chart, but peaked at number 10 on the Swedish Heatseeker Chart.)	20	181		Wildchild
"Passenger"	2026	100	82	16	71	37	27	— (Note: "Passenger" did not enter the NZ Top 40 Singles Chart, but peaked at number 3 on the NZ Hot Singles Chart.)	— (Note: "Passenger" did not enter the Swedish Singellista Chart, but peaked at number 7 on the Swedish Heatseeker Chart.)	22	—		Wildchild
"Rescuer"	2026	— (Note: "Rescuer" did not enter the Billboard Hot 100, but peaked at number 18 on the Bubbling Under Hot 100 chart.)	91	—	—	85	—	— (Note: "Rescuer" did not enter the NZ Top 40 Singles Chart, but peaked at number 2 on the NZ Hot Singles Chart.)	—	39	—		Wildchild
"Emerald Eyes"	2026	99	78	9	81	—	37	— (Note: "Emerald Eyes" did not enter the NZ Top 40 Singles Chart, but peaked at number 1 on the NZ Hot Singles Chart.)	—	58	—		Wildchild
"—" denotes releases that did not chart in that territory.

== Other charted songs ==
List of other charted songs, with selected chart positions, showing year released and album name
Title	Year	Peak chart positions		Album
Title	Year	NZ Hot	UK	Album
"Catch My Breath"	2024	17	—	You'll Be Alright, Kid
"You'll Be Alright, Kid"	2024	23	—	You'll Be Alright, Kid
"Burning Down (Alex's Version)"	2024	26	—	Non-album song
"The Outside"	2025	8	—	You'll Be Alright, Kid
"First Time on Earth"	2025	9	—	You'll Be Alright, Kid
"Never Be Far"	2025	11	—	You'll Be Alright, Kid
"Same Stars"	2026	3	—	Wildchild
"Cry Wolf"	2026	2	49	Wildchild
"I Miss You More"	2026	4	—	Wildchild
