= Finding Family on the Road =

Concert tour by Alex Warren

- Tour by Alex Warren
- Location: Asia; Oceania; Europe; North America
- Associated album: You'll Be Alright, Kid
- Start date: April 4, 2026
- End date: September 12, 2026
- Legs: 3
- No. of shows: 68
- Supporting acts: Claire Rosinkranz; Nat and Alex Wolff; Noah Cyrus; Alyssa Grace
- Website: www.alexwarrenofficial.com

Finding Family on the Road was an ongoing concert tour by American singer-songwriter Alex Warren. The tour began on April 4, 2026, at PSD Bank Dome in Düsseldorf, Germany, and concluded on September 12, 2026, at RAC Arena in Perth, Australia. It was Warren’s first arena tour, with performances across North America, Europe, Asia, and Oceania.

== Background ==
Prior to announcing the tour, Warren achieved commercial success with his debut album You’ll Be Alright, Kid, which was certified Platinum by the RIAA and spent 13 non-consecutive weeks in the top ten of the Billboard 200. Its lead single, “Ordinary”, topped several charts, including the Billboard Hot 100, Billboard Global 200, and the UK Singles Chart. The song also broke records on the Billboard Pop Airplay chart and surpassed two billion global streams, while Warren won the MTV Video Music Award for Best New Artist in 2025.

Following the announcement of the North American leg of the Finding Family on the Road tour, Warren announced additional dates for Asia, Australia, and New Zealand on March 16, 2026. The expansion included performances at Summer Sonic in Tokyo and Osaka, marking the tour’s first shows in Asia before continuing through Singapore, New Zealand, and Australia.

The announcement was accompanied by a comedic promotional video released on TikTok featuring Australian wildlife presenter Robert Irwin. In the sketch, Warren and his wife, Kouvr Annon, wake up late and rush to pack for their trip before discovering an alligator at their front door. After the couple unsuccessfully attempts to deal with the animal, they call Irwin, who persuades it to leave before driving the pair to begin the tour.

In Australia and New Zealand, American Express cardholders received access to a presale beginning March 18, followed by a Frontier Touring promoter presale on March 19 and the general on-sale on March 20.

== Commercial performance ==
The tour experienced strong commercial demand following the success of Warren’s debut album You’ll Be Alright, Kid and its lead single “Ordinary”. Several Australian dates sold out shortly after tickets went on sale, prompting the addition of extra shows to meet demand. Similar demand was reported in other markets as the tour expanded internationally.

== Setlist ==
This setlist was taken from Warren's first performance in Düsseldorf, Germany. The following information, however, does not apply to all dates.

1. "Troubled Waters"
2. "Bloodline"
3. "The Outside"
4. "First Time on Earth"
5. "Before You Leave Me"
6. "You'll Be Alright, Kid"
7. "Passenger"
8. "Never Be Far"
9. "Eternity"
10. "Catch My Breath"
11. "Same Stars"
12. "Heaven Without You"
13. "Fine Place to Die"
14. "Getaway Car"
15. "You Can't Stop This"
16. "Carry You Home"
17. "Save You a Seat"
18. "Burning Down"
19. "Fever Dream"
20. "Ordinary"

Alterations

- The songs "Fine Place to Die", "Same Stars", and "Passenger" had their live debut in the first show of the tour in Düsseldorf, Germany. All of the songs were unreleased at the time of the show.

== Tour dates ==
List of 2026 concerts
Date (2026)	City	Country	Venue	Supporting acts	Attendance
April 4	Düsseldorf	Germany	PSD Bank Dome	Claire Rosinkranz	TBA
April 6	Amsterdam	Netherlands	Ziggo Dome	Claire Rosinkranz	TBA
April 7	Amsterdam	Netherlands	Ziggo Dome	Claire Rosinkranz	TBA
April 9	Paris	France	Accor Arena	Claire Rosinkranz	TBA
April 10	Frankfurt	Germany	Festhalle	Claire Rosinkranz	TBA
April 13	Berlin	Germany	Uber Arena	Claire Rosinkranz	TBA
April 15	Oslo	Norway	Unity Arena	Claire Rosinkranz	TBA
April 16	Copenhagen	Denmark	Royal Arena	Claire Rosinkranz	TBA
April 18	Antwerp	Belgium	AFAS Dome	Claire Rosinkranz	TBA
April 20	London	England	The O_{2}	Claire Rosinkranz	TBA
April 21	London	England	The O_{2}	Claire Rosinkranz	TBA
April 23	Newcastle	England	Utilita Arena Newcastle	Claire Rosinkranz	TBA
April 24	Birmingham	England	Utilita Arena Birmingham	Claire Rosinkranz	TBA
April 26	Glasgow	Scotland	OVO Hydro	Claire Rosinkranz	TBA
April 27	Manchester	England	Co-op Live	Claire Rosinkranz	TBA
April 29	Leeds	England	First Direct Arena	Claire Rosinkranz	TBA
April 30	Nottingham	England	Motorpoint Arena	Claire Rosinkranz	TBA
May 2	Belfast	Northern Ireland	SSE Arena	Claire Rosinkranz	TBA
May 4	Manchester	England	Co-op Live	Claire Rosinkranz	TBA
May 6	Dublin	Ireland	3Arena	Claire Rosinkranz	TBA
May 7	Dublin	Ireland	3Arena	Claire Rosinkranz	TBA
May 25	Nashville	United States	Bridgestone Arena	Nat and Alex Wolff	TBA
May 27	Houston	United States	Toyota Center	Nat and Alex Wolff	TBA
May 29	Fort Worth	United States	Dickies Arena	Nat and Alex Wolff	TBA
May 30	Austin	United States	Moody Center	Nat and Alex Wolff	TBA
June 2	Morrison	United States	Red Rocks Amphitheatre	Nat and Alex Wolff	TBA
June 3	Colorado Springs	United States	Ford Amphitheater	Nat and Alex Wolff	TBA
June 5	Phoenix	United States	Mortgage Matchup Center	Nat and Alex Wolff	TBA
June 6	Los Angeles	United States	Crypto.com Arena	Nat and Alex Wolff	TBA
June 8	San Diego	United States	Viejas Arena	Nat and Alex Wolff	TBA
June 12	Portland	United States	Moda Center	Nat and Alex Wolff	TBA
June 13	Seattle	United States	Climate Pledge Arena	Nat and Alex Wolff	TBA
June 14	Vancouver	Canada	Rogers Arena	Nat and Alex Wolff	TBA
June 17	Salt Lake City	United States	Utah First Credit Union Amphitheatre	Nat and Alex Wolff	TBA
June 19	Omaha	United States	CHI Health Center	Nat and Alex Wolff	TBA
June 21	Kansas City	United States	T-Mobile Center	Nat and Alex Wolff	TBA
June 23	Pittsburgh	United States	PPG Paints Arena	Noah Cyrus	TBA
June 25	Atlanta	United States	State Farm Arena	Noah Cyrus	TBA
June 26	Charlotte	United States	Spectrum Center	Noah Cyrus	TBA
June 27	Cleveland	United States	Rocket Arena	Noah Cyrus	TBA
June 29	Chicago	United States	United Center	Noah Cyrus	TBA
July 2	Saint Paul (Note: Promoted as Minneapolis)	United States	Grand Casino Arena	Noah Cyrus	TBA
July 3 (Note: This show is part of Summerfest.)	Milwaukee	United States	American Family Insurance Amphitheater	Noah Cyrus	TBA
July 5	Detroit	United States	Little Caesars Arena	Noah Cyrus	TBA
July 7	Toronto	Canada	RBC Amphitheatre	Noah Cyrus	TBA
July 8	Montreal	Canada	Centre Bell	Noah Cyrus	TBA
July 10	Philadelphia	United States	Xfinity Mobile Arena	Noah Cyrus	TBA
July 11	Columbia	United States	Merriweather Post Pavilion	Noah Cyrus	TBA
July 13	Boston	United States	TD Garden	Noah Cyrus	TBA
July 15	New York City	United States	Madison Square Garden	Noah Cyrus	TBA
July 17	Minot	United States	North Dakota State Fair	Noah Cyrus	TBA
July 18	Cheyenne	United States	Cheyenne Frontier Days Arena	Noah Cyrus	TBA
August 15	Tokyo	Japan	Summer Sonic	—N/a	TBA
August 16	Osaka	Japan	Summer Sonic	—N/a	TBA
August 18	Singapore		Star Theatre	—N/a	TBA
August 21	Christchurch	New Zealand	Wolfbrook Arena	Alyssa Grace	TBA
August 22	Christchurch	New Zealand	Wolfbrook Arena	Alyssa Grace	TBA
August 25	Auckland	New Zealand	Spark Arena	Alyssa Grace	TBA
August 28	Sydney	Australia	Afterpay Arena	Alyssa Grace	TBA
August 29	Sydney	Australia	Afterpay Arena	Alyssa Grace	TBA
August 30	Sydney	Australia	Afterpay Arena	Alyssa Grace	TBA
September 1	Brisbane	Australia	Brisbane Entertainment Centre	Alyssa Grace	TBA
September 2	Brisbane	Australia	Brisbane Entertainment Centre	Alyssa Grace	TBA
September 4	Melbourne	Australia	Rod Laver Arena	Alyssa Grace	TBA
September 5	Melbourne	Australia	Rod Laver Arena	Alyssa Grace	TBA
September 6	Melbourne	Australia	Rod Laver Arena	Alyssa Grace	TBA
September 9	Adelaide	Australia	Adelaide Entertainment Centre Arena	Alyssa Grace	TBA
September 12	Perth	Australia	RAC Arena	Alyssa Grace	TBA

=== Cancelled concerts ===
Date (2026)	City	Country	Venue	Reason	Ref.
August 24	Auckland	New Zealand	Spark Arena	Sickness	
