= 2026 iHeartRadio Music Awards =

American music awards

- Date: March 26, 2026
- Location: Dolby Theatre, Los Angeles
- Country: United States
- Hosted by: Ludacris
- Most awards: Taylor Swift (7)
- Most nominations: Taylor Swift (9)
- Website: www.iheart.com/music-awards

Television/radio coverage
- Network: Fox

The 2026 iHeartRadio Music Awards was held at the Dolby Theatre in Los Angeles on March 26, 2026, and broadcast live on Fox. It was hosted by Ludacris.

At the ceremony, Miley Cyrus was honored with the iHeartRadio Innovator Award for her "fearless and dynamic artist" whose journey from Hannah Montana to global icon, combined with her humanitarian advocacy for homeless and at‑risk youth, has made her one of the most influential voices in music and culture. Ludacris was honored with the iHeartRadio Landmark Award for "pioneering force in hip‑hop" whose multi‑platinum albums, Grammy wins, and acclaimed acting roles have shaped culture across decades, making him one of the most successful and influential artists of his generation. John Mellencamp was honored with the iHeartRadio Icon Awards for his enduring contributions as a singer‑songwriter whose career‑defining hits such as "Jack & Diane", "Pink Houses", and "Small Town", along with his decades of activism including co‑founding Farm Aid, have made him a central figure in American music and culture. Taylor Swift won the most awards.

== Performers ==
The first lineup of performers was announced on March 11. The second lineup of performers was announced on March 19.

Performers at the 2026 iHeartRadio Music Awards
Performer(s)	Song(s)
Alex Warren	"Ordinary" "Fever Dream"
Lainey Wilson	"Wildflowers and Wild Horses" "Hang Tight Honey" "Heart Like a Truck"
TLC En Vogue Salt-N-Pepa DJ Spinderella	Medley: "Hold On" "Waterfalls" "Shoop" "Whatta Man" "Creep" "No Scrubs" "Free Your Mind" "Push It"
John Mellencamp	"Jack & Diane" "Pink Houses"
Kehlani	"Folded"
Raye	"Where Is My Husband!"
Ludacris	Medley: "Pull Over" "Rollout (My Business)" "Money Maker" "My Chick Bad" "Stand Up" "Move Bitch"

== Winners and nominees ==
iHeartRadio announced the nominees on January 8, 2026. Taylor Swift led with nine nominations. She is followed by Alex Warren, Bad Bunny, and Sabrina Carpenter with eight nominations each. A new fan-voted category for Live Performers was announced on March 31.

Winners are listed first and in bold.

=== Main categories ===
Song of the Year	Artist of the Year
**"Ordinary" – Alex Warren**; "Anxiety" – Doechii; "Good News" – Shaboozey; "Love Somebody" – Morgan Wallen; "Luther" – Kendrick Lamar and SZA; "Manchild" – Sabrina Carpenter; "Mutt" – Leon Thomas; "Sorry I'm Here for Someone Else" – Benson Boone; "Stargazing" – Myles Smith; "The Fate of Ophelia" – Taylor Swift	**Taylor Swift**; Bad Bunny; Benson Boone; Chris Brown; Jelly Roll; Kendrick Lamar; Lady Gaga; Morgan Wallen; Sabrina Carpenter; Tate McRae
Duo/Group of the Year	Best Collaboration
**Huntrix: Ejae, Audrey Nuna, and Rei Ami**; Linkin Park; Shinedown; Twenty One Pilots; Maroon 5	**"APT." – Rosé and Bruno Mars**; "All the Way" – BigXthaPlug featuring Bailey Zimmerman; "Luther" – Kendrick Lamar and SZA; "Timeless" – The Weeknd featuring Playboi Carti; "Whatchu Kno About Me" – GloRilla featuring Sexyy Red
Pop Artist of the Year	Best New Pop Artist
**Sabrina Carpenter**; Alex Warren; Benson Boone; Tate McRae; Taylor Swift	**Alex Warren**; Jessie Murph; Myles Smith; Ravyn Lenae; Sombr
Pop Song of the Year	Country Song of the Year
**"The Fate of Ophelia" – Taylor Swift**; "Golden" – Huntrix: Ejae, Audrey Nuna and Rei Ami; "Manchild" – Sabrina Carpenter; "Ordinary" – Alex Warren; "Pink Pony Club" – Chappell Roan	**"Good News" – Shaboozey**; "After All the Bars Are Closed" – Thomas Rhett; "Liar" – Jelly Roll; "Love Somebody" – Morgan Wallen; "Whiskey Drink" – Jason Aldean
Country Artist of the Year	Best New Country Artist
**Morgan Wallen**; Jason Aldean; Jelly Roll; Lainey Wilson; Luke Combs	**Ella Langley**; Chase Matthew; Hudson Westbrook; Josh Ross; Zach Top
Hip-Hop Song of the Year	Hip-Hop Artist of the Year
**"Luther" – Kendrick Lamar and SZA**; "Outside" – Cardi B; "Nokia" – Drake; "The Largest" – BigXthaPlug; "Whatchu Kno About Me" – GloRilla featuring Sexyy Red	**Kendrick Lamar**; Cardi B; GloRilla; Playboi Carti; Tyler, the Creator
Best New Hip-Hop Artist	R&B Song of the Year
**Real Boston Richey**; Moliy; Pluto; YKNiece; Zeddy Will	**"Folded" – Kehlani**; "Burning Blue" – Mariah the Scientist; "Mutt" – Leon Thomas; "Residuals" – Chris Brown; "Somebody Loves Me" – PartyNextDoor & Drake
R&B Artist of the Year	Best New R&B Artist
**Chris Brown**; Kehlani; Leon Thomas; Mariah the Scientist; SZA	**Leon Thomas**; Jenevieve; Kwn; Mariah the Scientist; Sailorr
World Artist of the Year	Alternative Song of the Year
**Moliy**; Ayra Starr; Jackson Wang; JO1; Tyla	**"Ensenada" – Sublime**; "Back to Friends" – Sombr; "One Eyed Bastard" – Green Day; "Stargazing" – Myles Smith; "The Contract" – Twenty One Pilots
Alternative Artist of the Year	Best New Alternative Artist
**Twenty One Pilots**; Cage the Elephant; Green Day; Linkin Park; Sublime	**Sombr**; Almost Monday; Gigi Perez; Lola Young; Role Model
Rock Song of the Year	Rock Artist of the Year
**"Heavy Is the Crown" – Linkin Park**; "Afterlife" – Evanescence; "Bad Guy" – Falling in Reverse featuring Saraya; "Dance, Kid, Dance" – Shinedown; "Even If It Kills Me" – Papa Roach	**Shinedown**; Linkin Park; Papa Roach; Sleep Token; Three Days Grace
Best New Rock Artist	Dance Song of the Year
**Sleep Theory**; Architects; Poppy; Return to Dust; Spiritbox	**"No Broke Boys" – Disco Lines and Tinashe**; "Blessings" – Calvin Harris featuring Clementine Douglas; "In My Arms" – Illenium and Hayla; "Save My Love" – Marshmello, Ellie Goulding and Avaion; "Won't Be Possible" – Tiësto, Odd Mob and Goodboys
Dance Artist of the Year	Latin Pop/Urban Song of the Year
**David Guetta**; Calvin Harris; John Summit; Martin Garrix; Tiësto	**"DTMF" – Bad Bunny**; "Angel" – Grupo Frontera and Romeo Santos; "Degenere" – Myke Towers and Benny Blanco; "Qué Pasaría..." – Rauw Alejandro and Bad Bunny; "Soltera" – Shakira
Latin Pop/Urban Artist of the Year	Best New Latin/Urban Artist
**Bad Bunny**; Feid; J Balvin; Karol G; Shakira	**Beéle**; Alleh Mezher; De La Rose; Dei V; Louis BPM
Regional Mexican Song of the Year	Regional Mexican Artist of the Year
**"Amor Bonito" – Luis Angel "El Flaco"**; "El Amor de Mi Vida" – Calibre 50; "Flores" – Xavi; "Hecha Pa' Mi" – Grupo Frontera; "Lejos Estamos Mejor" – Edén Muñoz	**Grupo Frontera**; Alejandro Fernández; Carín León; Fuerza Regida; Luis Angel "El Flaco"
Best New Regional Mexican Artist	K-Pop Artist of the Year
**Los Dos De Tamaulipas**; Clave Especial; Edgardo Nuñez; Óscar Maydon; Oscar Ortiz	**Rosé**; Jennie; J-Hope; Jin; Lisa
K-Pop Group of the Year	K-Pop Song of the Year
**Stray Kids**; Ateez; Blackpink; Enhypen; Twice	**"Golden" – Huntrix: Ejae, Audrey Nuna, and Rei Ami**; "APT." – Rosé and Bruno Mars; "Jump" – Blackpink; "Killin' It Girl" – J-Hope featuring GloRilla; "Like Jennie" – Jennie
Best K-Pop New Artist	Songwriter of the Year
**Cortis**; 82Major; AllDay Project; Hearts2Hearts; Meovv	**Amy Allen**; Ashley Gorley; Cal Shapiro; Charlie Handsome; Julia Michaels
Producer of the Year	Breakthrough Artist of the Year
**Andrew Watt**; Dijon; Jack Antonoff; Max Martin and Shellback; Sounwave	**Alex Warren**
**Andrew Watt**; Dijon; Jack Antonoff; Max Martin and Shellback; Sounwave	Album of the Year
**Andrew Watt**; Dijon; Jack Antonoff; Max Martin and Shellback; Sounwave	**The Life of a Showgirl – Taylor Swift**
Album of the Year (per genre)
Alternative: **I Barely Know Her – Sombr**; Country: **I'm the Problem – Morgan Wallen**; Dance: **Mayhem – Lady Gaga**; Hip-Hop: **GNX – Kendrick Lamar**; K-Pop: **Ruby – Jennie**; Latin Pop/Urban: **Debí Tirar Más Fotos – Bad Bunny**; Pop: **The Life of a Showgirl – Taylor Swift**; R&B: **Pholks – Leon Thomas**; Regional Mexican: **111xpantia – Fuerza Regida**; Rock: **Even in Arcadia – Sleep Token**

=== Socially voted categories ===
Best Lyrics	Best Music Video
**"The Fate of Ophelia" – Taylor Swift**; "Anxiety" – Doechii; "Baile Inolvidable" – Bad Bunny; "Camera" – Ed Sheeran; "Choosin' Texas" – Ella Langley; "Daisies" – Justin Bieber; "Golden" – Huntrix: Ejae, Audrey Nuna and Rei Ami; "Man I Need" – Olivia Dean; "Manchild" – Sabrina Carpenter; "Ordinary" – Alex Warren; "Undressed" – Sombr; "Where Is My Husband!" – Raye	**"The Fate of Ophelia" – Taylor Swift**; "Abracadabra" – Lady Gaga; "Baile Inolvidable" – Bad Bunny; "Born Again" – Lisa featuring Doja Cat and Raye; "Gabriela" – Katseye; "Jump" – Blackpink; "Like Jennie" – Jennie; "Manchild" – Sabrina Carpenter; "Ordinary" – Alex Warren; "Sapphire" – Ed Sheeran; "Shake It to the Max (Fly) (Remix)" – Moliy, Shenseea, Skillibeng and Silent Addy; "Toxic Till the End" – Rosé
Favorite Debut Album	Favorite K-Pop Collaboration
**You'll Be Alright, Kid – Alex Warren**; Addison – Addison Rae; Who's the Clown? – Audrey Hobert; Order Chaos Order – Calum Hood; Why Not More? – Coco Jones; That's Showbiz Baby – Jade; Ruby – Jennie; Alter Ego – Lisa; Sidequest – Michael Clifford; Perrie – Perrie; I Barely Know Her – Sombr; What Not To – Tucker Wetmore	**"Sweet Dreams" – J-Hope featuring Miguel**; "Blink" – Corbyn Besson and Tzuyu of Twice; "Born Again" – Lisa featuring Doja Cat and Raye; "Buck" – Jackson Wang featuring Diljit Dosanjh; "Confessions" – Flo Rida, Heeseung and Jake of Enhypen, and Paul Russell; "Dirty Work" – Aespa featuring Flo Milli; "ExtraL" – Jennie and Doechii; "Eyes Closed" – Jisoo and Zayn; "Illegal" – PinkPantheress and Seventeen; "On My Mind" – Alex Warren and Rosé; "Too Bad" – G-Dragon featuring Anderson .Paak; "We Pray (Twice version)" – Coldplay, Twice, Little Simz, Burna Boy, Elyanna and Tini
Favorite TikTok Dance	Favorite On Screen
**"Mona Lisa" – J-Hope**; "Abracadabra" – Lady Gaga; "Gnarly" – Katseye; "Go!" – Cortis; "Happen to Me" – Russell Dickerson; "Jump" – Blackpink; "Like Jennie" – Jennie; "Midnight Sun" – Zara Larsson; "Revolving Door" – Tate McRae; "Spaghetti" – Le Sserafim and J-Hope; "The Fate of Ophelia" – Taylor Swift	**Jimin and Jung Kook – Are You Sure?**; AJ McLean, Nicole Scherzinger, Liam Payne, and Kelly Rowland – Building the Band; Ariana Grande and Cynthia Erivo – Wicked: For Good; Bad Bunny – Happy Gilmore 2; Becky G – Rebecca; Ed Sheeran – One Shot with Ed Sheeran: A Musical Experience; Jonas Brothers – A Very Jonas Christmas Movie; Karol G – Karol G: Tomorrow Was Beautiful; Lady Gaga – Wednesday; Lisa – The White Lotus; Taylor Swift – Taylor Swift: The End of an Era; Zara Larsson – Up Close
Favorite Tour Photographer	Favorite Tour Style
**Rahul Bhatt – Katseye**; Abby Waisler – Gracie Abrams; Adam DeGross – Post Malone; Anna Lee – Coldplay; Baeth – Tate McRae; Chris Cornejo – Shakira; Cynthia Parkhurst – Katy Perry; Henry Hwu – Billie Eilish; Hyghly – The Weeknd; Joshua Halling – Oasis; Thomas Falcone – Shawn Mendes; Tom Pallant – Yungblud	**Taylor Swift – The Eras Tour**; Bad Bunny – Debí Tirar Más Fotos World Tour; Beyoncé – Cowboy Carter Tour; Billie Eilish – Hit Me Hard and Soft: The Tour; Blackpink – Deadline World Tour; Dua Lipa – Radical Optimism Tour; Ella Langley – Still Hungover Tour; Katseye – Beautiful Chaos Tour; Lady Gaga – The Mayhem Ball; Sabrina Carpenter – Short n' Sweet Tour; Tate McRae – Miss Possessive Tour; Zara Larsson – Midnight Sun Tour
Favorite Tour Tradition	Favorite Broadway Debut
**Coldplay – Crowd cam**; Benson Boone – Cover song; Beyoncé – Blue Ivy and Rumi on stage; Billie Eilish – "When the Party's Over" silent loop; Dua Lipa – Surprise guest; Jonas Brothers – Surprise guest; Katseye – "Gnarly" dance break; Lainey Wilson – Cowgirl of the night; Role Model – Sally; Sabrina Carpenter – Celebrity "Juno" arrest; Tate McRae – Fan cam on stage; Zara Larsson – "Lush Life" star	**Tom Felton – Harry Potter and the Cursed Child**; Ashley Graham – Chicago; Cheryl Porter – & Juliet; Durrell "Tank" Babbs – Hell's Kitchen; Gabrielle Nevaeh Green – Stranger Things: The First Shadow; Jack Wolfe – Hadestown; Kelsie Watts – Six! The Musical; Lencia Kebede – Wicked; Lizzy McAlpine – Floyd Collins; Meg Donnelly – Moulin Rouge! The Musical; Ne-Yo – Hell's Kitchen; Trisha Paytas – Beetlejuice
Favorite Soundtrack	Fan Favorite Live Performer of the Year
**KPop Demon Hunters**; A Very Jonas Christmas Movie; F1; Frankenstein; Nobody Wants This – Season 2; Sinners; Smurfs; Springsteen: Deliver Me from Nowhere; Tron: Ares; Wicked: For Good; Zombies 4: Dawn of the Vampires	Billie Eilish; Lady Gaga; Sabrina Carpenter; Kendrick Lamar; Tyler, The Creator; Morgan Wallen; Oasis; Beyoncé; The Weeknd; Bad Bunny

=== Special awards ===
iHeartRadio Innovator	iHeartRadio Landmark Award
**Miley Cyrus**	**Ludacris**
iHeartRadio Icon Award
**John Mellencamp**

== Multiple nominations ==
The following received multiple nominations:

9 nominations

- Taylor Swift
- Bad Bunny
- Sabrina Carpenter

8 nominations

- Alex Warren
- Morgan Wallen
- Kendrick Lamar

7 nominations

- SZA

6 nominations

- Benson Boone
- Lady Gaga
- Tate McRae

5 nominations

- Myles Smith
- Blackpink

4 nominations

- Huntrix: Ejae, Audrey Nuna, and Rei Ami
- Jelly Roll
- Chris Brown
- GloRilla
- J-hope
