= Alyssa Grace =

American singer (born 2007)

- Born: June 17, 2007 (age 19); Torrance, California, U.S.
- Genres: Pop; folk-pop
- Occupations: Singer; songwriter
- Instruments: Vocals; guitar
- Years active: 2025–present
- Label: Artist House
- Website: alyssagrace.com

Alyssa Grace Proffitt (born June 17, 2007) is an American singer-songwriter based in California. She made her recording debut in 2026 with "Dog with a Bone" and gained wider recognition through the singles "Picking Petals" and "Bloodstream".

== Musical career ==
Grace began receiving attention on TikTok and Instagram in October 2025. In February 2026, she released "Dog with a Bone". This was followed by "Picking Petals", which reached number 90 on the UK singles chart.

In April 2026, Grace teased the single "Bloodstream". The song is about a conversation she had with her mother about her then-toxic partner and about her own experiences with her father. The song became a worldwide hit and reached the charts in several countries; peaking at 45 on the billboard hot 100. Her debut extended play (EP) Spilling My Guts was released on July 24, 2026, via Artist House.

== Musical style ==
Musically, Grace's music is a blend of indie folk, country, and bedroom pop, driven by an acoustic guitar. Her music tends to be melancholic and deals with her own experiences as a teenager.

== Discography ==
=== Extended plays ===
List of studio albums, with selected details
Title	Details	Peak chart positions	
Title	Details	AUS	NZ
Spilling My Guts	Released: July 24, 2026; Label: Artist House; Format: Digital download, streaming	44	35

=== Singles ===
List of singles, with selected chart positions, showing year released and album name
Title	Year	Peak chart positions						Certifications	Album or EP
Title	Year	US	AUS	CAN	GER	UK	WW	Certifications	Album or EP
"Take Me Home"	2025	—	—	—	—	—	—		Non-album single
"Dog with a Bone"	2026	—	—	—	—	—	—		Spilling My Guts
"Picking Petals"	2026	—	—	—	—	90	—		Spilling My Guts
"Bloodstream"	2026	45	17	38	84	12	63	RIAA: Gold; ARIA: Gold; BPI: Silver; MC: Platinum	Spilling My Guts
"Washing Skin"	2026	—	—	—	—	—	—		TBA

== Tours ==
=== Headlining ===
- Wanna Be Singer Tour (2026)

=== Opening act ===
- Alex Warren – Finding Family on the Road (2026)
- Noah Kahan - The Last Of The Bugs North American Tour (2027)
