= Bloodstream (disambiguation) =

Bloodstream refers to vascular circulation.

Bloodstream may also refer to

- "Bloodstream" (Alyssa Grace song), 2026
- "Bloodstream" (Ed Sheeran song), 2014
- "Bloodstream", 2005 song by Stateless from The Bloodstream EP
- "Bloodstream", 2017 song by The Chainsmokers on Memories...Do Not Open
