= Wildchild (album) =

Studio album by Alex Warren
- Released: August 28, 2026
- Recorded: 2025–2026
- Studios: Gnome Recording Studios (Nashville) Gold Pacific Studios (Nashville) Woodshed Recording (Malibu)
- Genre: Pop
- Length: 38:55
- Label: Atlantic
- Producer: Adam Yaron

Alex Warren chronology
You'll Be Alright, Kid (2025)	Wildchild (2026)

Alternative cover
- Live on the Road cover

Singles from Wildchild
- 1. "Fever Dream" Released: February 26, 2026; 2. "Fine Place to Die" Released: April 30, 2026; 3. "Passenger" Released: June 5, 2026; 4. "Rescuer" Released: August 7, 2026; 5. "Emerald Eyes" Released: August 28, 2026

Wildchild (stylised in all caps) is the second studio album by American singer-songwriter Alex Warren. The album was released on August 28, 2026, through Atlantic Records. The album was supported by four singles, "Fever Dream", "Fine Place to Die", "Passenger", and "Rescuer". Commercially, it debuted at number two on the Billboard 200, becoming Warren's highest-charting album, and reaching number one in Australia, Germany, New Zealand, the Netherlands and the United Kingdom.

== Background and composition ==
[My dad] knew he was dying. He knew he had terminal cancer. So it’s heartbreaking when you watch those videos, and if you go and listen again with the idea that this is this person’s last time being able to experience these moments, you feel like there’s sadness in the happiness you hear in his voice. That inspired a lot of the writing.

— Alex Warren to American Songwriter in 2026

Warren, who rose to fame with his number-one breakout single "Ordinary", released his debut studio album, You'll Be Alright, Kid, in July 2025. On February 4, 2026, Warren shared a video of himself and his wife, Kouvr Annon, listening to the track, with the caption, "Alex Warren will never write something as good as Ordinary". Three days later, he shared another video of himself recording the song in the studio. On February 26, 2026 "Fever Dream" was released through Atlantic Records as the lead single of an upcoming record project. On June 3, 2026, Warren released a satirical sketch video on his Instagram featuring actor Kevin James, depicting him and a production team filming an announcement video, announcing that the album would be released on August 28, 2026.

The thirteen-track album is written and composed by Warren himself with Adam Yaron, Mags Duval, and Cal Shapiro, whom collaborate with Warren on his debut record project. The songs themes are about the relationship between Warren and his parents, focusing on his father and the grieving process he went through when his father passed away, and the marriage with his wife Kouvr Annon. In an interview with American Songwriter, Warren explained he drew inspiration for his songwriting and melodies from John Mayer, a musician his father admired.

== Promotion ==
=== Singles ===
The lead single "Fever Dream" was released on February 26, 2026, through Atlantic Records. The song reached the top-ten on several charts, including in Canada, United Kingdom, Germany and Switzerland, and it reached number 20 in Australia and 21 on the US Billboard Hot 100. The second single "Fine Place to Die" was released on April 30, 2026. The third single "Passenger" was released on June 4, 2026, followed by "Rescuer", released on August 7, 2026, and "Emerald Eyes", coinciding with the album release on August 28, 2026, before being sent to US radio on September 1.

=== Album editions ===
On August 31, 2026, Warren released Wildchild (Live on the Road), an expanded edition of the album through Atlantic Records. The edition retains the album's original 13 tracks and adds live recordings of "Passenger", "Same Stars", "Fine Place to Die", and "Fever Dream", recorded during the Finding Family on the Road Tour. The Apple Music edition additionally includes an exclusive live performance video of "Fever Dream".

== Critical reception ==
Professional ratings
Review scores
Source	Rating
Paste	D
RGM	B−
Rolling Stone	3/5 stars

Wildchild received mixed to negative reviews from critics. Rob Sheffield of Rolling Stone gave the album three out of five stars. He praised Warren's sincerity and the album's "warmth", while suggesting that Warren was still developing his artistic identity. Eva De Poorter of Het Nieuwsblad described Wildchild as a personal and mature album, praising its balance of ballads and uptempo songs while finding it musically unsurprising.

Danielle Holian of When the Horn Blows gave a positive assessment, praising the album's emotional honesty and Warren's treatment of grief. She described the record as deeply personal while highlighting the universality of its themes, and wrote that Warren had expanded the emotional range of his music while retaining his established artistic identity. Allyson Franzo of Melodic Magazine similarly praised the range of emotions explored across the album and its ability to remain cohesive despite shifts in subject matter and tone.

Emma Platt of RGM gave the album a B−, praising Warren's willingness to experiment and the combination of pop with gospel, soul, folk, and rock influences. She also praised his vocal performance, but felt that he had yet to establish a distinctive musical identity. Casey Epstein-Gross of Paste was more critical, giving Wildchild a D and arguing that the album prioritized broad appeal over artistic risk.

== Commercial performance ==
In the United States Wildchild debuted at number two on the Billboard 200 with 75,000 equivalent album units according to Luminate, becoming the singer's second top ten and highest-charted album on the chart.

In the United Kingdom, the album debuted at number one on the Official Albums Chart, becoming Warren's second consecutive album to achieve it. In Australia, the album debuted at number one on the ARIA Albums Chart, becoming his second top ten album since his debut album You'll Be Alright, Kid peaked at number two.

== Track listing ==
All tracks are written by Alex Warren, Mags Duval, Cal Shapiro, and Adam Yaron.

Wildchild track listing
No.	Title	Length
1.	"Emerald Eyes"	2:36
2.	"Same Stars"	3:23
3.	"Passenger"	2:39
4.	"Rescuer"	3:19
5.	"Cry Wolf"	2:44
6.	"Fine Place to Die"	3:07
7.	"Are You Having Fun, Alex?"	1:31
8.	"I Miss You More"	3:05
9.	"Only Thing Left"	3:38
10.	"Fever Dream"	2:33
11.	"Won’t Go Back Again"	2:56
12.	"Last Time"	3:17
13.	"Wildchild"	4:07
Total length:		38:55

Wildchild (Live on the Road) bonus tracks
No.	Title	Length
14.	"Passenger" (live)	2:44
15.	"Same Stars" (live)	3:29
16.	"Fine Place to Die" (live)	4:24
17.	"Fever Dream" (live)	4:33

== Personnel ==
Credits are adapted from Tidal.

=== Musicians ===
- Alex Warren – vocals (all tracks), background vocals (track 3)
- Adam Yaron – piano (all tracks), background vocals (1–6, 8–13), bass (1–4, 6, 8–12), guitars (1, 2, 4, 6–8, 10, 13), synthesizer programming (1, 8), electric guitar (3, 5, 9, 11, 12), programming (3, 5, 10–12), organ (4, 8), strings programming (7, 9), arrangement (7); drum programming, percussion (10); acoustic guitar, drums (11, 12)
- Cal Shapiro – background vocals (1–6, 8–13), percussion (8), claps (10), drums (11)
- Mags Duval – background vocals (1–6, 8–13), claps (10)
- Shawn Law Yone Gilad – strings (1, 6, 10, 13), violin (2, 4, 5, 7, 10), strings arrangement (2, 4, 5), viola (7)
- Jon Truman – drums (1, 13)
- Nile Rodgers – electric guitar (1)
- Benz Marston Duglio – cello (2, 4)
- Daniel Lim – cello (2, 4)
- Drew Alexander Forde – viola (2, 4)
- Solomon Leonard – viola (2, 4)
- Yasmeen Al-Mazeedi – violin (2, 4)
- Aaron Sterling – drums (3, 5, 8, 10)
- YungCoconutMilk – background vocals (3)
- Isaiah Gage – cello (5, 9)
- Sean Hurley – bass (5, 13)
- James Ward Hughes – vocals (7, 13)
- Dan Bailey – drums (9), percussion (10)
- John Mayer – electric guitar (13)

=== Technical ===
- Adam Yaron – production (all tracks), engineering (1, 3–10, 12), mixing (6), executive production
- Nile Rodgers – additional production (1)
- John Mayer – additional production (13)
- Cal Shapiro – engineering (1, 3–6, 8, 10, 12)
- Mags Duval – engineering (1, 3–6, 8, 10, 12)
- Chase Weber – engineering (1, 4, 8, 10–13)
- Russell Graham – engineering (1)
- Dan Ballard – engineering (2, 10, 12)
- Aaron Sterling – engineering (3), drum engineering (5, 8, 12)
- Grayson Pollard – engineering (4, 13)
- Curt Schneider – engineering (13)
- Jacob Dennis – string engineering (2, 4)
- Maguire Fraatz – engineering assistance (1, 4, 8, 10–13)
- Dannon Johnson – engineering assistance (8, 12)
- Ciaran De Chaud – engineering assistance (13)
- Manny Marroquin – mixing (1)
- Mark "Spike" Stent – mixing (2, 4, 5, 7–9, 11–13)
- Alex Ghenea – mixing (3)
- Pedro Calloni – mixing (10)
- Jack Normile – mixing assistance (3)
- Nathan Dantzler – mastering

== Charts ==
Chart performance for Wildchild
Chart (2026)	Peak position
Australian Albums (ARIA)	1
Austrian Albums (Ö3 Austria)	3
Belgian Albums (Ultratop Flanders)	1
Belgian Albums (Ultratop Wallonia)	1
Canadian Albums (Billboard)	3
Czech Albums (ČNS IFPI)	32
Danish Albums (Hitlisten)	7
Dutch Albums (Album Top 100)	1
French Albums (SNEP)	27
German Albums (Offizielle Top 100)	1
German Pop Albums (Offizielle Top 100)	1
Hungarian Albums (MAHASZ)	37
Irish Albums (Official Charts)	10
New Zealand Albums (RMNZ)	1
Norwegian Albums (IFPI Norge)	5
Polish Albums (ZPAV)	80
Portuguese Albums (AFP)	54
Scottish Albums (Official Charts)	1
Spanish Albums (Promusicae)	36
Swedish Albums (Sverigetopplistan)	14
Swiss Albums (Schweizer Hitparade)	2
UK Albums (Official Charts)	1
US Billboard 200	2
