= You'll Be Alright, Kid =

Studio album by Alex Warren
- Released: July 18, 2025
- Recorded: 2023–2025
- Studio: Various
- Length: 63:27
- Label: Atlantic
- Producers: Adam Yaron; Ammo; John Ryan

Alex Warren chronology
You'll Be Alright, Kid (Chapter 1) (2024)	You'll Be Alright, Kid (2025)	Wildchild (2026)

Singles from You'll Be Alright, Kid
- 1. "Ordinary" Released: February 7, 2025; 2. "Bloodline" Released: May 22, 2025; 3. "On My Mind" Released: June 27, 2025; 4. "Eternity" Released: July 18, 2025

You'll Be Alright, Kid is the debut studio album by American singer-songwriter Alex Warren, and was released on July 18, 2025, through Atlantic Records. The album serves as a continuation of his 2024 extended play You'll Be Alright, Kid (Chapter 1), and was supported by the release of four singles. It features guest appearances from American musician Jelly Roll and New Zealand-South Korean singer Rosé.

== Release and promotion ==
On September 26, 2024, a ten-track extended play, You'll Be Alright, Kid (Chapter 1), was released as a precursor to You'll Be Alright, Kid. The extended play went on to receive gold certifications from the British Phonographic Industry, Music Canada, and NVPI.

On February 7, 2025, "Ordinary" was released as the lead single from You'll Be Alright, Kid. It was also included on the digital reissue of You'll Be Alright, Kid (Chapter 1). The song was certified platinum by the Australian Recording Industry Association, British Phonographic Industry, and Recorded Music New Zealand. The album's second single, "Bloodline", a collaboration with Jelly Roll, was released on May 22, 2025.

On July 17, 2025, the album was premiered at nearly 4,000 Chipotle Mexican Grill restaurant locations prior to its worldwide release the following day.

== Critical reception ==
Professional ratings
Review scores
Source	Rating
Pitchfork	5.0/10
Rolling Stone	3/5 stars
Showbiz by PS	3.0/10

You'll Be Alright, Kid generally received mixed reviews from critics. In a three-out-of-five star review for the Rolling Stone, Maura Johnston described the "2010-esque" album as often feeling "mired in the self-seriousness of hoary post-grunge and stomp-and-holler folk-pop", all the while commenting on its lack of musical originality but noting Warren's artistic potential. Hannah Jocelyn of Pitchfork positively noted the affective intimacy of Warren's songs but criticized most of the album's "anonymity" as "a tide of post-Hozier Sad Guy Music". She also observed that despite the album's influences from contemporary worship music, which "gradually builds to a state of ecstasy", Warren's work "doesn't have the patience", consisting of songs that "usually max out within the first minute".

== Commercial performance ==
The extended play, You'll Be Alright, Kid (Chapter 1), debuted at No. 62 on the Billboard 200, later peaking at No. 13. The EP also went on to hit No. 3 on the Canadian Albums, No. 9 on the UK Albums, and No. 38 on the Italy Albums charts. The album's lead single "Ordinary" went on to top several charts, including the Billboard Hot 100, Canadian Hot 100, and Global 200. "Bloodline" hit No. 32 on the Billboard Hot 100 and No. 19 on the Global 200.

== Track listing ==
All tracks are written by Adam Yaron, Cal Shapiro, Mags Duval, and Alex Warren, except where noted.

Disc 1
No.	Title	Writer(s)	Length
1.	"Eternity"		3:09
2.	"The Outside"		3:03
3.	"First Time on Earth"		2:41
4.	"Bloodline" (with Jelly Roll)	Warren; Yaron; Shapiro; Jason DeFord; Duval	3:02
5.	"Never Be Far"		3:17
6.	"Ordinary"		3:06
7.	"Everything"		2:48
8.	"Getaway Car"		3:04
9.	"Who I Am"		3:22
10.	"You Can't Stop This"	Warren; Yaron; Shapiro; Duval; Ben Haggerty; Ray Dalton; Ryan Lewis	2:41
11.	"On My Mind" (with Rosé)	Warren; Alexander Izquierdo; Chae Young Park; John Ryan; Joshua Coleman	3:09
Total length:			33:22

Disc 2 – You'll Be Alright, Kid (Chapter 1)
No.	Title	Writer(s)	Length
12.	"Burning Down"		2:59
13.	"Catch My Breath"		3:12
14.	"Carry You Home"		2:46
15.	"Troubled Waters"		3:17
16.	"Heaven Without You"		3:22
17.	"Before You Leave Me"	Yaron; Warren; Charlie Oriain; Rollo	2:56
18.	"Save You a Seat"	Yaron; Shapiro; Warren	3:17
19.	"Chasing Shadows"	Yaron; Nolan Sipe; Warren	2:44
20.	"Yard Sale"	Yaron; Sipe; Warren	2:54
21.	"You'll Be Alright, Kid"	Sipe; Warren; Alex Wilke	2:29
Total length:			29:56 63:18

Notes

- "On My Mind" appears only on digital editions, later vinyl record pressings, and as track 21 on Japanese CD pressings for You'll Be Alright, Kid.

== Personnel ==
Credits adapted from Tidal.

=== Musicians ===
- Alex Warren – vocals
- Adam Yaron – background vocals (all tracks); bass, piano (tracks 1–10, 12–21); guitar (1–6, 8–10, 12–16, 18, 19, 21), drum programming (1–6, 9, 10), percussion (1–5, 8, 10, 12–16, 18), mandolin (1, 4, 20), organ (2, 5), banjo (4, 14, 20), synthesizer programming (6), programming (12–14, 17–19, 21), harmonica (13, 20)
- Cal Shapiro – background vocals (1–16, 18)
- Mags Duval – background vocals (1–16)
- Dan Bailey – drums (1–3, 8, 12, 15, 17, 20), percussion (1, 8)
- Tiger Darrow – string arrangement, cello, viola (1, 3, 7, 13)
- Yanni Burton – double bass (1, 7)
- Tiffany Ibáñez-Weiss – violin (1, 7)
- Enzo Iannello – electric guitar (3, 8, 15)
- Chase Potter– violin (3, 13)
- Jelly Roll – vocals (4)
- Jesse McGinty – baritone saxophone, tenor saxophone, trombone (5, 10); trumpet (5)
- Michael Cordone – trumpet (10)
- John Ryan – background vocals, bass, drum programming, drums, guitar, keyboards, keyboard programming, programming, synthesizer (11)
- Ammo – background vocals, drum programming, drums, keyboards, keyboard programming, percussion, programming, synthesizer (11)
- Alexander Izquierdo – background vocals, triangle (11)
- Damon Bunetta – background vocals (11)
- Rosé – vocals (11)
- Rollo – background vocals (17)
- Nolan Sipe – background vocals (20)
- Alex Wilke – programming (21)

=== Technical ===
- Adam Yaron – production (1–10, 12–21), engineering (all tracks), executive production
- Ammo – production (11)
- John Ryan – production (11)
- Manny Marroquin – mixing (1–5, 8, 10)
- Alex Ghenea – mixing (6, 11–16, 18, 21)
- Mitch McCarthy – mixing (7, 9)
- Pedro Calloni – mixing (17)
- John O'Mahoney – mixing (19)
- Matthew Huber – mixing (20)
- Nathan Dantzler – mastering (1–5, 7, 8–11)
- Randy Merrill – mastering (6, 12–16, 18, 19, 21)
- Dave Kutch – mastering (17, 20)
- Cal Shapiro – engineering (1–10)
- Dan Bailey – engineering (1–3, 8, 20)
- Mags Duval – engineering (1–10)
- Tiger Darrow – engineering (1, 3)
- Grayson Pollard – engineering (3)
- Mason Sexton – engineering (3, 8)
- Jesse McGinty – engineering (5, 10)
- Jeff Gunnell – engineering (11)
- Taylor Kernohan – engineering (11)
- Gabe Yaron – engineering (13, 21)
- Patrick Kehrier – engineering (17)
- Alexander Izquierdo – vocal production (11)

== Charts ==
=== Weekly charts ===
Weekly chart performance for You'll Be Alright, Kid
Chart (2025)	Peak position
Australian Albums (ARIA)	2
Canadian Albums (Billboard)	3
Czech Albums (ČNS IFPI)	5
Danish Albums (Hitlisten)	6
German Albums (Offizielle Top 100)	7
Hungarian Albums (MAHASZ)	5
Icelandic Albums (Tónlistinn)	19
Italian Albums (FIMI)	18
Lithuanian Albums (AGATA)	59
Nigerian Albums (TurnTable)	28
Norwegian Albums (IFPI Norge)	1
Polish Albums (ZPAV)	35
Slovak Albums (ČNS IFPI)	5
Spanish Albums (PROMUSICAE)	26
Swedish Albums (Sverigetopplistan)	12
US Billboard 200	5

=== Year-end charts ===
Year-end chart performance for You'll Be Alright, Kid
Chart (2025)	Position
Australian Albums (ARIA)	8
Austrian Albums (Ö3 Austria)	22
Belgian Albums (Ultratop Flanders)	7
Canadian Albums (Billboard)	13
Dutch Albums (Album Top 100)	2
French Albums (SNEP)	44
German Albums (Offizielle Top 100)	30
Hungarian Albums (MAHASZ)	38
Icelandic Albums (Tónlistinn)	25
New Zealand Albums (RMNZ)	5
Swedish Albums (Sverigetopplistan) Chapter 1	4
Swiss Albums (Schweizer Hitparade)	10
UK Albums (OCC)	9
US Billboard 200	26

== Certifications ==
Certifications for You'll Be Alright, Kid
Region	Certification	Certified units/sales
Austria (IFPI Austria)	Platinum	15,000^{‡}
Canada (Music Canada)	3× Platinum	240,000^{‡}
Denmark (IFPI Danmark)	Gold	10,000^{‡}
Germany (BVMI)	Gold	75,000^{‡}
Italy (FIMI)	Platinum	50,000^{‡}
New Zealand (RMNZ)	4× Platinum	60,000^{‡}
Portugal (AFP)	Gold	3,500^{‡}
Spain (Promusicae)	Gold	20,000^{‡}
United States (RIAA)	Platinum	1,000,000^{‡}
^{‡} Sales+streaming figures based on certification alone.
