= Bloodstream (Alyssa Grace song) =

2026 single by Alyssa Grace

Single by Alyssa Grace

from the EP Spilling My Guts
- Released: June 5, 2026
- Length: 2:57
- Label: Artist House
- Songwriters: Alyssa Grace; Steven Martinez
- Producer: Steven Martinez

Alyssa Grace singles chronology
"Picking Petals" (2026)	"Bloodstream" (2026)	"Washing Skin" (2026)

Music video
- "Bloodstream" on YouTube

"Bloodstream" is a song by American singer and songwriter Alyssa Grace, released as the third single from her debut extended play (EP) Spilling My Guts (2026) on June 5, 2026. She wrote the song with the producer Steven Martinez.

== Background and promotion ==
In 2026, Alyssa Grace had been gathering attention on Instagram and TikTok. After she shared a portion of the song in April 2026, fans demanded the full version and she went on to officially release the song on June 5, 2026. The song was based on a personal experience involving a toxic relationship that she refused to leave despite her mother's advice.

== Composition ==
The song incorporates elements of folk-pop, indie folk, bedroom pop and contemporary country. The instrumental is led by acoustic guitar, with the addition of an atmospheric drum pattern and poignant strings toward the song's conclusion. The lyrics portray Grace in a vulnerable moment, as she outlines the strains in her relationship. She begins by reflecting on traits she shares with her father, like his anger. During the chorus, she juxtaposes her agony with her ex's empty words. In the second verse, she examines how she believed she could changed him and help resolve his issues, but now sees that it is impossible.

== Charts ==
Chart performance for "Bloodstream"
Chart (2026)	Peak position
Australia (ARIA)	17
Canada (Canadian Hot 100)	38
Global 200 (Billboard)	63
Ireland (IRMA)	21
Lebanon (Lebanese Top 20)	13
Netherlands (Single Top 100)	43
New Zealand (Recorded Music NZ)	13
Nigeria (TurnTable Top 100)	69
Norway (VG-lista)	11
Sweden (Sverigetopplistan)	23
Switzerland (Schweizer Hitparade)	92
UK Singles (Official Charts)	12
US Billboard Hot 100	45
US Adult Pop Airplay (Billboard)	32
US Hot Rock & Alternative Songs (Billboard)	9

== Certifications ==
Certifications for "Bloodstream"
Region	Certification	Certified units/sales
Australia (ARIA)	Gold	35,000^{‡}
Canada (Music Canada)	Platinum	80,000^{‡}
New Zealand (RMNZ)	Gold	15,000^{‡}
United Kingdom (BPI)	Silver	200,000^{‡}
United States (RIAA)	Gold	500,000^{‡}
^{‡} Sales+streaming figures based on certification alone.
