= On My Mind (Alex Warren and Rosé song) =

- Digital cover

Single by Alex Warren and Rosé

from the album You'll Be Alright, Kid
- Released: June 27, 2025
- Genre: Folk-pop; folk rock
- Length: 3:09
- Label: Atlantic
- Songwriters: Alex Warren; Roseanne Park; Alexander Izquierdo; John Ryan; Joshua Coleman
- Producers: Ammo; John Ryan

Alex Warren singles chronology
"Bloodline" (2025)	"On My Mind" (2025)	"Eternity" (2025)

Rosé singles chronology
"Messy" (2025)	"On My Mind" (2025)	"New Trick" (2026)

Music video
- "On My Mind" on YouTube

"On My Mind" is a song by American singer Alex Warren and New Zealand and South Korean singer Rosé. It was released on June 27, 2025, through Atlantic Records as the third single from Warren's debut studio album, You'll Be Alright, Kid (2025). A folk-pop and folk rock ballad about yearning for a loved one after a breakup, it was written by Warren and Rosé with Alexander Izquierdo and its producers John Ryan and Ammo.

== Background and release ==
On June 18, Warren teased an upcoming single with a TikTok video of himself mouthing along to the song's lyrics overlaid with the text "I promise you won’t guess who’s featuring on this…" while Rosé peeks into the frame. She further commented on the post, "can somebody tell me who that is." Warren also wrote in the post’s caption that it "would be CRAZY if we drop it this month…", hinting at the song's June release date. On June 20, the two officially confirmed their collaboration on the single "On My Mind", due for release on June 27. On June 23, Rosé posted a TikTok video of herself lip-syncing to a new snippet of the song captioned "sorry @Alex Warren, i.. had to give them this part before it’s out on friday."

== Composition and lyrics ==
"On My Mind" was written by Warren, Rosé, Alexander Izquierdo, John Ryan, and Joshua Coleman, with the latter two also provided with producer credits. It has been described to be a somber folk-pop and folk rock ballad characterized by its use of rhythmic acoustic guitar, horns, and kick drums. Lyrically, the song expresses the nostalgia of a relationship and the yearning for a loved one after a breakup.

== Critical reception ==
The song received a mixed reception from music critics. Rolling Stone's Maura Johnston noted the song as an example of Warren's over-reliance on self-serious "hoary post-grunge and stomp-and-holler folk-pop", describing that the song's choruses "don’t arrive as much as they explode".

== Accolades ==
Awards and nominations for "On My Mind"
Year	Organization	Award	Result	Ref.
2026	iHeartRadio Music Awards	Favorite K-pop Collab	Nominated	

== Music video ==
Directed by Colin Tilley, an accompanying music video for "On My Mind" was released on June 27. Although Warren and Rosé filmed their scenes separately, the video utilized transitions and changes in point of view to pair them together. In one scene, Warren peers into a dollhouse with the camera zooming in to show Rosé inside. The point of view then shifts to hers, showing Warren as a giant through the window. The final shots use split screens of Warren and Rosé on opposite sides of a wall, giving the impression of them being neighbors in an apartment building.

== Charts ==
=== Weekly charts ===
Weekly chart performance
Chart (2025)	Peak position
Argentina Anglo Airplay (Monitor Latino)	14
Australia (ARIA)	91
Belgium (Ultratop 50 Flanders)	34
Bolivia Anglo Airplay (Monitor Latino)	10
Canada Hot 100 (Billboard)	60
Canada CHR/Top 40 (Billboard)	23
Chile Anglo Airplay (Monitor Latino)	17
China (TME Korean)	31
Czech Republic Airplay (ČNS IFPI)	6
Global 200 (Billboard)	57
Ireland (IRMA)	53
Japan Hot Overseas (Billboard Japan)	12
Lebanon (Lebanese Top 20)	3
Lithuania Airplay (TopHit)	29
Netherlands (Single Tip)	6
New Zealand Hot Singles (RMNZ)	10
Portugal Airplay (AFP)	24
Romania Airplay (Media Forest)	6
Romania TV Airplay (Media Forest)	20
South Korea Download (Circle)	38
UK Singles (Official Charts)	37
US Billboard Hot 100	60
US Adult Contemporary (Billboard)	29
US Adult Pop Airplay (Billboard)	14
US Pop Airplay (Billboard)	17

=== Monthly charts ===
Monthly chart performance
Chart (2025)	Peak position
Lithuania Airplay (TopHit)	41
Romania Airplay (TopHit)	13

=== Year-end charts ===
Year-end chart performance
Chart (2025)	Position
Romania Airplay (TopHit)	52

== Certifications ==
Certifications for "On My Mind"
Region	Certification	Certified units/sales
Canada (Music Canada)	Gold	40,000^{‡}
^{‡} Sales+streaming figures based on certification alone.

== Release history ==
Release dates and formats
Region	Date	Format	Label	Ref.
Various	June 27, 2025	CD; 7-inch vinyl; digital download; streaming	Atlantic	
Italy	June 27, 2025	Radio airplay	Warner Italy	
United States	June 30, 2025	Adult contemporary radio	Atlantic	
United States	July 1, 2025	Contemporary hit radio	Atlantic	
