= Eternity (Alex Warren song) =

Single by Alex Warren

from the album You'll Be Alright, Kid
- Released: July 18, 2025
- Length: 3:10
- Label: Atlantic
- Songwriters: Alexander Hughes; Adam Yaron; Cal Shapiro; Mags Duval
- Producer: Adam Yaron

Alex Warren singles chronology
"On My Mind" (2025)	"Eternity" (2025)	"Fever Dream" (2026)

Music video
- "Eternity" on YouTube

"Eternity" is a song by American singer-songwriter Alex Warren. It was released on July 18, 2025, through Atlantic Records as the fourth single from his debut studio album, You'll Be Alright, Kid, which was released on the same day. Warren wrote the track alongside Adam Yaron, Cal Shapiro, and Mags Duval, with Yaron also serving as producer.

== Background and composition ==
On July 14, 2025, four days before the release of his debut studio album You'll Be Alright, Kid, Warren discussed the inspiration behind "Eternity". The song was written in response to personal grief, reflecting on the deaths of both of his parents; his father died of cancer when Warren was nine, his mother died due to alcohol-related issues. In an interview with Los Angeles Times, he noted that some listeners had envisioned the track being played at their weddings. He compared this response to the reception of Lewis Capaldi's 2019 single "Someone You Loved", which was similarly interpreted as romantic despite its actual meaning.

Described as "a powerful song about loss and missing your special person", the track features Warren's "deep, chesty baritone", which transitions into a "more conventional pop pitch". The minimalist production includes acoustic plucks, vocal harmonies and a subdued backing choir. The song was released on July 18, 2025, as both the opening track and third single from his debut studio album.

== Lyrics and meaning ==
Framed as a reflective ballad, "Eternity" voices first-person mourning and addresses an absent “you,” using images of time, light and separation to portray ongoing grief and continued attachment beyond loss; the lyric returns to the line “feels like an eternity” and references “paradise” and “chasing the light.” Music publications characterized the track as a “heartbreaking” ballad, emphasizing its plaintive tone and cathartic swell.

== Critical reception ==
The song received mixed reviews from music critics. Tim Strong of Showbiz By PS cited the song as an example of the album's "extremely formulaic and calculated" nature, noting that it contains "surface-level catchy moments with potential for virality" but lacks "substance".

== Music video ==
The accompanying music video was released on July 18, 2025.

== Charts ==
=== Weekly charts ===
Weekly chart performance for "Eternity"
Chart (2025–2026)	Peak position
Australia (ARIA)	10
Austria (Ö3 Austria Top 40)	3
Belgium (Ultratop 50 Flanders)	3
Belgium (Ultratop 50 Wallonia)	40
Canada Hot 100 (Billboard)	17
Croatia International Airplay (Top lista)	11
Czech Republic Singles Digital (ČNS IFPI)	16
Denmark (Tracklisten)	33
Estonia Airplay (TopHit)	12
Finland Airplay (Radiosoittolista)	24
France (SNEP)	68
Germany (GfK)	12
Global 200 (Billboard)	11
Greece International (IFPI)	33
Hungary (Single Top 40)	28
Iceland (Tónlistinn)	15
Ireland (IRMA)	7
Lebanon (Lebanese Top 20)	9
Lithuania (AGATA)	86
Lithuania Airplay (TopHit)	27
Luxembourg (Billboard)	9
Malta Airplay (Radiomonitor)	15
Netherlands (Dutch Top 40)	5
Netherlands (Single Top 100)	14
New Zealand (Recorded Music NZ)	5
Norway (VG-lista)	7
Peru Anglo Airplay (Monitor Latino)	10
Poland Airplay (OLiS)	28
Poland Streaming (OLiS)	76
Portugal (AFP)	58
Romania Airplay (TopHit)	129
Slovakia Airplay (ČNS IFPI)	9
Slovakia Singles Digital (ČNS IFPI)	28
Sweden (Sverigetopplistan)	13
Switzerland (Schweizer Hitparade)	5
UK Singles (Official Charts)	3
US Billboard Hot 100	16
US Adult Pop Airplay (Billboard)	40

=== Monthly charts ===
Monthly chart performance for "Eternity"
Chart (2025)	Peak position
Estonia Airplay (TopHit)	13
Lithuania Airplay (TopHit)	40

=== Year-end charts ===
Year-end chart performance for "Eternity"
Chart (2025)	Position
Belgium (Ultratop 50 Flanders)	89
Estonia Airplay (TopHit)	66
Germany (GfK)	95
Netherlands (Dutch Top 40)	11
Netherlands (Single Top 100)	68
Switzerland (Schweizer Hitparade)	88

== Certifications ==
Certifications for "Eternity"
Region	Certification	Certified units/sales
Australia (ARIA)	Platinum	70,000^{‡}
Austria (IFPI Austria)	Gold	15,000^{‡}
Canada (Music Canada)	2× Platinum	160,000^{‡}
France (SNEP)	Platinum	200,000^{‡}
Netherlands (NVPI)	Platinum	93,000^{‡}
New Zealand (RMNZ)	Platinum	30,000^{‡}
United Kingdom (BPI)	Platinum	600,000^{‡}
^{‡} Sales+streaming figures based on certification alone.
