= Passenger (Alex Warren song) =

2026 single by Alex Warren

Single by Alex Warren

from the album Wildchild
- Released: June 4, 2026
- Genre: Pop
- Length: 2:39
- Label: Atlantic
- Songwriters: Alexander Hughes; Adam Yaron; Cal Shapiro; Mags Duval
- Producer: Yaron

Alex Warren singles chronology
"Fine Place to Die" (2026)	"Passenger" (2026)	"Rescuer" (2026)

Music video
- "Passenger" on YouTube

"Passenger" (stylised in all caps) is a song by American singer-songwriter Alex Warren, released on June 4, 2026, as the third single from his second studio album Wildchild (2026). It was written by Warren himself, Adam Yaron, Cal Shapiro of Timeflies and Mags Duval and produced by Yaron.

== Background and composition ==
"Passenger" was released alongside the announcement of Warren's second studio album, Wildchild, which was released on August 28, 2026. Uproxx described the song as "endearing".

During an August 2026 preview of Wildchild with Track Star, Warren said that he wrote "Passenger" when he "started in the music industry" and was struggling with the loss of control over his schedule. He explained that increasing professional commitments left less time for him and his wife, Kouvr Annon, and said that he initially struggled to balance his career with his personal life. Warren wrote the song during that period to reflect his feelings of helplessness and lack of control.

== Music video ==
The music video, directed by Blythe Thomas, was released on June 4, 2026. It features Alex Warren performing with his band and trying to get the attention of a woman (played by Mikela Goza) who is glued to her phone. He attempts to woo her by shooting off confetti, lifting weights, performing magic tricks, bringing an elephant, using a flamethrower, and a declaration of love in the clouds. Ultimately, Warren drives a forklift through the wall and tries to show her a declaration of love in the clouds, only to see her walk away with the man who was helping him with the magic tricks.

== Charts ==
=== Weekly charts ===
Weekly chart performance
Chart (2026)	Peak position
Australia (ARIA)	82
Belgium (Ultratop 50 Flanders)	16
Canada Hot 100 (Billboard)	71
CIS Airplay (TopHit)	146
Croatia International Airplay (Top lista)	40
Denmark Airplay (Tracklisten)	13
Estonia Airplay (TopHit)	3
Ireland (IRMA)	37
Italy Airplay (EarOne)	46
Kazakhstan Airplay (TopHit)	9
Latvia Airplay (LaIPA)	6
Lithuania Airplay (TopHit)	4
Moldova Airplay (TopHit)	35
Netherlands (Dutch Top 40)	20
Netherlands (Single Top 100)	80
Netherlands Airplay (Dutch Charts)	24
New Zealand Hot Singles (RMNZ)	3
New Zealand Airplay (RCS)	8
Nigeria (TurnTable Top 100)	89
Nigeria Airplay (TurnTable)	55
Poland (Polish Airplay Top 100)	14
Portugal Airplay (AFP)	6
Slovakia Airplay (ČNS IFPI)	1
Sweden Heatseeker (Sverigetopplistan)	7
Switzerland Airplay (MusicTrace)	13
UK Singles (Official Charts)	22
US Billboard Hot 100	100
Venezuela Anglo Airplay (Monitor Latino)	8

=== Monthly charts ===
Monthly chart performance
Chart (2026)	Peak position
Estonia Airplay (TopHit)	4
Kazakhstan Airplay (TopHit)	16
Lithuania Airplay (TopHit)	4
Moldova Airplay (TopHit)	38
