= Bloodline (Alex Warren and Jelly Roll song) =

Single by Alex Warren and Jelly Roll

from the album You'll Be Alright, Kid
- Released: May 22, 2025
- Recorded: 2023
- Genre: Folk-pop; country pop
- Length: 3:03
- Label: Atlantic
- Songwriters: Alex Warren; Jelly Roll; Adam Yaron; Cal Shapiro; Mags Duvall
- Producer: Adam Yaron

Alex Warren singles chronology
"Ordinary" (2025)	"Bloodline" (2025)	"On My Mind" (2025)

Jelly Roll singles chronology
"Heart of Stone" (2025)	"Bloodline" (2025)	"Holy Water" (2025)

Music video
- "Bloodline" on YouTube

"Bloodline" is a song by American singer-songwriter Alex Warren and country artist Jelly Roll. It was released on May 22, 2025, by Atlantic Records as the second single from Warren's debut studio album, You'll Be Alright, Kid. The song reached the top 10 in three countries, including Ireland, New Zealand and the United Kingdom.

== Release and promotion ==
Jelly Roll first introduced the song during his set at the Stagecoach Festival on April 26, 2025, bringing out Warren for a joint performance. Warren later announced the release on social media, with the song officially dropping on May 22.

== Composition ==
"Bloodline" was co-written by Alex Warren, Jelly Roll, Cal Shapiro, Mags Duvall, and producer Adam Yaron. It explores the theme of generational trauma, delivered through a blend of "pop and country" influences. The lyrics highlight the possibility of overcoming familial hardships.

== Music video ==
The official music video was released on May 30, starring both artists. The visuals are set in a medieval tavern, where Warren attempts to rally the townspeople to join him in a battle taking place outside. He is later joined by Jelly Roll.

== Accolades ==
Year	Organization	Category	Result	Ref.
2025	We Love Awards	Mainstream Impact Award	Nominated	

== Charts ==
=== Weekly charts ===
Weekly chart performance
Chart (2025–2026)	Peak position
Argentina Anglo (Monitor Latino)	16
Australia (ARIA)	12
Austria (Ö3 Austria Top 40)	23
Belgium (Ultratop 50 Flanders)	6
Canada Hot 100 (Billboard)	17
Canada AC (Billboard)	19
Canada CHR/Top 40 (Billboard)	35
Canada Hot AC (Billboard)	34
Croatia International Airplay (Top lista)	26
Czech Republic Singles Digital (ČNS IFPI)	83
Estonia Airplay (TopHit)	66
Finland Airplay (Radiosoittolista)	66
Germany (GfK)	44
Global 200 (Billboard)	19
Ireland (IRMA)	6
Latvia Airplay (LaIPA)	12
Lebanon (Lebanese Top 20)	12
Lithuania Airplay (TopHit)	33
Netherlands (Dutch Top 40)	13
Netherlands (Single Top 100)	21
New Zealand (Recorded Music NZ)	7
Norway (IFPI Norge)	11
Portugal (AFP)	127
Slovakia Singles Digital (ČNS IFPI)	87
Sweden (Sverigetopplistan)	21
Switzerland (Schweizer Hitparade)	24
UK Singles (Official Charts)	9
US Billboard Hot 100	32
US Adult Contemporary (Billboard)	23
US Adult Pop Airplay (Billboard)	16
US Pop Airplay (Billboard)	20

=== Monthly charts ===
Monthly chart performance
Chart (2025)	Peak position
Estonia Airplay (TopHit)	82
Lithuania Airplay (TopHit)	45

=== Year-end charts ===
Year-end chart performance
Chart (2025)	Position
Australia (ARIA)	99
Belgium (Ultratop 50 Flanders)	69
Canada (Canadian Hot 100)	67
Netherlands (Dutch Top 40)	38
Netherlands (Single Top 100)	99

== Certifications ==
Certifications for "Bloodline"
Region	Certification	Certified units/sales
Australia (ARIA)	Platinum	70,000^{‡}
Austria (IFPI Austria)	Gold	15,000^{‡}
Canada (Music Canada)	3× Platinum	240,000^{‡}
Netherlands (NVPI)	Gold	46,500^{‡}
New Zealand (RMNZ)	Platinum	30,000^{‡}
United Kingdom (BPI)	Gold	400,000^{‡}
United States (RIAA)	Gold	500,000^{‡}
^{‡} Sales+streaming figures based on certification alone.

== Release history ==
Release history and formats for "Bloodline"
Region	Date	Format(s)	Label	Ref.
United States	October 14, 2025	Contemporary hit radio	Atlantic	
