= Fever Dream (song) =

Single by Alex Warren

from the album Wildchild
- Released: February 26, 2026
- Genre: Pop
- Length: 2:33
- Label: Atlantic
- Songwriters: Alexander Hughes; Cal Shapiro; Mags Duval; Adam Yaron
- Producer: Adam Yaron

Alex Warren singles chronology
"Eternity" (2025)	"Fever Dream" (2026)	"Fine Place to Die" (2026)

Music video
- "Fever Dream" on YouTube

"Fever Dream" is a song by American singer-songwriter Alex Warren. It was released on February 26, 2026, through Atlantic Records. Warren wrote the track alongside Adam Yaron, Cal Shapiro, and Mags Duval, with Yaron also serving as producer.

== Background and promotion ==
Warren began teasing the song on his Instagram on February 4, 2026, by sharing a video of himself and his wife, Kouvr Annon, jamming to the track, with the caption, "Alex Warren will never write something as good as Ordinary". Three days later, he shared another video of himself recording the song in the studio. Within weeks, the accompanying teaser clips amassed over 100 million views in total.

== Composition ==
"Fever Dream" is an "arena-sized pop" song with a "rhythmic piano base" and a "strong drumbeat". It is described as "jaunty" and a "high-voltage single that captures life at full speed". Lyrically, the song reflects on the moment when Warren and Annon first met. It encapsulates the thrill of a "hard-hitting romance" alongside the "whirlwind of rising fame," as experienced by Warren and his wife.

== Music video ==
The accompanying music video, directed by Andrew Balasia, released on February 27, 2026, features Warren walking through a series of "over-the-top homes", each representing a familiar face. The visuals amplify the song's "restless energy", portraying it in an "exaggerated" and comedic way. The video also features media personality Paris Hilton, who later shared a behind-the-scenes clip on her TikTok.

== Charts ==
=== Weekly charts ===
Weekly chart performance
Chart (2026)	Peak position
Australia (ARIA)	20
Australia Airplay (RCS)	1
Austria (Ö3 Austria Top 40)	2
Belarus Airplay (TopHit)	7
Belgium (Ultratop 50 Flanders)	1
Belgium (Ultratop 50 Wallonia)	5
Bolivia Anglo Airplay (Monitor Latino)	4
Canada Hot 100 (Billboard)	10
Canada AC (Billboard)	2
Canada CHR/Top 40 (Billboard)	7
Canada Hot AC (Billboard)	6
Colombia Anglo Airplay (Monitor Latino)	18
CIS Airplay (TopHit)	2
Croatia International Airplay (Top lista)	2
Czech Republic Airplay (ČNS IFPI)	2
Czech Republic Singles Digital (ČNS IFPI)	3
Denmark (Tracklisten)	7
Denmark Airplay (Tracklisten)	1
Dominican Republic Anglo Airplay (Monitor Latino)	20
Ecuador Anglo Airplay (Monitor Latino)	13
Estonia Airplay (TopHit)	1
Finland (Suomen virallinen lista)	42
Finland Airplay (Radiosoittolista)	3
France (SNEP)	68
France Airplay (SNEP)	2
Germany (GfK)	5
Germany Airplay (MusicTrace)	1
Global 200 (Billboard)	14
Greece International (IFPI)	27
Guatemala Anglo Airplay (Monitor Latino)	4
Hungary (Rádiós Top 40)	5
Hungary (Single Top 40)	7
Ireland (IRMA)	5
Israel International Airplay (Media Forest)	1
Italy Airplay (EarOne)	9
Japan Hot Overseas (Billboard Japan)	18
Kazakhstan Airplay (TopHit)	25
Latin America Anglo Airplay (Monitor Latino)	20
Latvia Airplay (LaIPA)	1
Latvia Streaming (LaIPA)	11
Lebanon (Lebanese Top 20)	2
Lithuania (AGATA)	47
Lithuania Airplay (TopHit)	2
Luxembourg (Billboard)	20
Malta Airplay (Radiomonitor)	2
Mexico Anglo Airplay (Monitor Latino)	7
Moldova Airplay (TopHit)	29
Netherlands (Dutch Top 40)	1
Netherlands (Single Top 100)	1
New Zealand (Recorded Music NZ)	13
New Zealand Airplay (RCS)	7
Nicaragua Anglo Airplay (Monitor Latino)	8
Nigeria (TurnTable Top 100)	89
Nigeria Airplay (TurnTable)	46
North Macedonia Airplay (Radiomonitor)	4
Norway (VG-lista)	6
Norway Airplay (IFPI)	2
Paraguay Anglo Airplay (Monitor Latino)	12
Poland Airplay (OLiS)	2
Poland Streaming (OLiS)	59
Portugal (AFP)	98
Puerto Rico Anglo Airplay (Monitor Latino)	10
Romania Airplay (Media Forest)	10
Romania TV Airplay (Media Forest)	19
Russia Airplay (TopHit)	4
San Marino Airplay (SMRTV Top 50)	6
Serbia Airplay (Radiomonitor)	1
Slovakia Airplay (ČNS IFPI)	1
Slovakia Singles Digital (ČNS IFPI)	2
Slovenia Airplay (Radiomonitor)	1
South Africa Airplay (TOSAC)	2
South Africa Streaming (TOSAC)	39
Spain Airplay (Promusicae)	5
Sweden (Sverigetopplistan)	11
Sweden Airplay (Radiomonitor)	1
Switzerland (Schweizer Hitparade)	2
Switzerland Airplay (MusicTrace)	1
Ukraine Airplay (TopHit)	1
UK Singles (Official Charts)	3
Uruguay Anglo Airplay (Monitor Latino)	9
US Billboard Hot 100	21
US Adult Contemporary (Billboard)	25
US Adult Pop Airplay (Billboard)	10
US Pop Airplay (Billboard)	12
Venezuela Airplay (Record Report)	43
Venezuela Rock Airplay (Record Report)	2

=== Monthly charts ===
Monthly chart performance
Chart (2026)	Peak position
Belarus Airplay (TopHit)	10
CIS Airplay (TopHit)	2
Estonia Airplay (TopHit)	2
Kazakhstan Airplay (TopHit)	51
Latvia Airplay (TopHit)	4
Lithuania Airplay (TopHit)	4
Moldova Airplay (TopHit)	36
Romania Airplay (TopHit)	15
Russia Airplay (TopHit)	5
Ukraine Airplay (TopHit)	5

== Certifications ==
Region	Certification	Certified units/sales
Austria (IFPI Austria)	Gold	15,000^{‡}
Canada (Music Canada)	2× Platinum	160,000^{‡}
Denmark (IFPI Danmark)	Gold	45,000^{‡}
France (SNEP)	Gold	100,000^{‡}
New Zealand (RMNZ)	Platinum	30,000^{‡}
United Kingdom (BPI)	Platinum	600,000^{‡}
^{‡} Sales+streaming figures based on certification alone.

== Release history ==
Release dates and formats for "Fever Dream"
Region	Date	Format	Label(s)	Ref.
United States	March 3, 2026	Contemporary hit radio	Atlantic	
