= Carry You Home (Alex Warren song) =

2024 single by Alex Warren

Single by Alex Warren

from the album You'll Be Alright, Kid (Chapter 1)
- Released: May 31, 2024
- Genre: Folk-pop
- Length: 2:46
- Label: Atlantic
- Songwriters: Alexander Hughes; Aaron Yaron; Cal Shapiro; Mags Duval
- Producer: Yaron

Alex Warren singles chronology
"Save You a Seat" (2024)	"Carry You Home" (2024)	"Troubled Waters" (2024)

Music video
- "Carry You Home" on YouTube

Remix cover
- Cover art of the official remix featuring Ella Henderson.

Ella Henderson singles chronology
"Under the Sun" (2024)	"Carry You Home" (2024)	"Filthy Rich" (2024)

"Carry You Home" is a song by American singer-songwriter Alex Warren, released on May 31, 2024, through Atlantic Records as the fifth single from his debut extended play You'll Be Alright, Kid (Chapter 1) (2024). It was written by Warren himself, the producer Aaron Yaron, Cal Shapiro and Mags Duval. An official remix of the song featuring British singer Ella Henderson was released on August 9, 2024.

== Background ==
Marcy Donelson of AllMusic described the song as "anthemic, empowering festival pop" and "at-first tender, then foot-stomping".

== Critical reception ==
Reagan Denning of Melodic wrote that "Warren pours his heart into 'Carry You Home,' a beautifully written track dedicated to his wife, Kouvr. Every lyric feels like a love letter set to music."

== Charts ==
=== Weekly charts ===
Weekly chart performance for "Carry You Home"
Chart (2024–2025)	Peak position
Australia (ARIA)	20
Austria (Ö3 Austria Top 40)	40
Belgium (Ultratop 50 Flanders)	6
Canada Hot 100 (Billboard)	56
CIS Airplay (TopHit)	154
Czech Republic Airplay (ČNS IFPI) Remix Version	86
Denmark Airplay (Tracklisten)	10
Estonia Airplay (TopHit)	22
France (SNEP) Remix Version	48
Global 200 (Billboard)	82
Ireland (IRMA)	7
Lebanon (Lebanese Top 20)	8
Lithuania Airplay (TopHit)	34
Lithuania Airplay (TopHit) Remix Version	36
Malta Airplay (Radiomonitor)	13
Netherlands (Dutch Top 40)	4
Netherlands (Single Top 100)	13
New Zealand (Recorded Music NZ)	15
Norway (VG-lista)	28
Poland (Polish Airplay Top 100)	5
Portugal (AFP)	120
Romania Airplay (TopHit) Remix Version	49
Sweden (Sverigetopplistan)	46
Switzerland (Schweizer Hitparade)	24
UK Singles (Official Charts)	9
US Bubbling Under Hot 100 (Billboard)	4
US Adult Pop Airplay (Billboard)	27
US Hot Rock & Alternative Songs (Billboard)	14
US Pop Airplay (Billboard)	36

=== Monthly charts ===
Monthly chart performance for "Carry You Home"
Chart (2025)	Peak position
Estonia Airplay (TopHit)	37
Romania Airplay (TopHit) Remix version	79

=== Year-end charts ===
2024 year-end chart performance for "Carry You Home"
Chart (2024)	Position
Belgium (Ultratop 50 Flanders)	41
Netherlands (Dutch Top 40)	5
Netherlands (Single Top 100)	51
US Hot Rock & Alternative Songs (Billboard)	49

2025 year-end chart performance for "Carry You Home"
Chart (2025)	Position
Australia (ARIA)	29
Belgium (Ultratop 50 Flanders)	59
Belgium (Ultratop 50 Wallonia)	171
Estonia Airplay (TopHit)	105
France (SNEP)	170
Global 200 (Billboard)	146
Netherlands (Single Top 100)	37
New Zealand (Recorded Music NZ)	28
Sweden (Sverigetopplistan)	73
Switzerland (Schweizer Hitparade)	43
UK Singles (OCC)	30
US Hot Rock & Alternative Songs (Billboard)	88

== Certifications ==
Certifications for "Carry You Home"
Region	Certification	Certified units/sales
Australia (ARIA)	2× Platinum	140,000^{‡}
Austria (IFPI Austria)	Platinum	30,000^{‡}
Belgium (BRMA)	Gold	20,000^{‡}
Canada (Music Canada)	5× Platinum	400,000^{‡}
Denmark (IFPI Danmark)	Platinum	90,000^{‡}
France (SNEP)	Diamond	333,333^{‡}
Netherlands (NVPI)	Platinum	93,000^{‡}
New Zealand (RMNZ)	3× Platinum	90,000^{‡}
Poland (ZPAV)	Gold	62,500^{‡}
Portugal (AFP)	Gold	5,000^{‡}
Spain (Promusicae)	Gold	50,000^{‡}
United Kingdom (BPI)	2× Platinum	1,200,000^{‡}
United States (RIAA)	Platinum	1,000,000^{‡}
^{‡} Sales+streaming figures based on certification alone.
