= Save You a Seat =

2024 single by Alex Warren

Single by Alex Warren

from the album You'll Be Alright, Kid (Chapter 1)
- Released: March 29, 2024
- Length: 3:17
- Label: Atlantic
- Songwriters: Alexander Hughes; Aaron Yaron; Cal Shapiro
- Producer: Yaron

Alex Warren singles chronology
"Before You Leave Me" (2024)	"Save You a Seat" (2024)	"Carry You Home" (2024)

"Save You a Seat" is a song by American singer-songwriter Alex Warren, released on March 29, 2024, through Atlantic Records as the fourth single from his debut extended play You'll Be Alright, Kid (Chapter 1) (2024). It was written by Warren himself, the producer Aaron Yaron and Cal Shapiro.

== Background ==
The song revolves around the theme of losing loved ones, with Alex Warren paying tribute to his deceased parents. Following the song's release, he shared a related message:

My parents aren't alive to see me get married, so I'm saving them an empty seat. This song is extremely special to me as I'm getting married in June. It allows me to illustrate the feeling of them being there in spirit, that I can see that open seat as my wife walks down the aisle. It's also been so cool to see the song go viral on TikTok and see everyone's videos of the sound. A lost Mother/Father, dog or pet, child or friend. EVERYONE can relate to loss. So, I'm very excited to share this song with everyone.

== Charts ==
Chart performance for "Save You a Seat"
Chart (2024)	Peak position
Ireland (IRMA)	89
Norway (VG-lista)	26
Sweden (Sverigetopplistan)	70
UK Singles (Official Charts)	93
US Bubbling Under Hot 100 (Billboard)	19

== Certifications ==
Region	Certification	Certified units/sales
Australia (ARIA)	Platinum	70,000^{‡}
Canada (Music Canada)	2× Platinum	160,000^{‡}
New Zealand (RMNZ)	Platinum	30,000^{‡}
United Kingdom (BPI)	Silver	200,000^{‡}
United States (RIAA)	Gold	500,000^{‡}
^{‡} Sales+streaming figures based on certification alone.
