= Alex Warren =

American singer and influencer (born 2000)

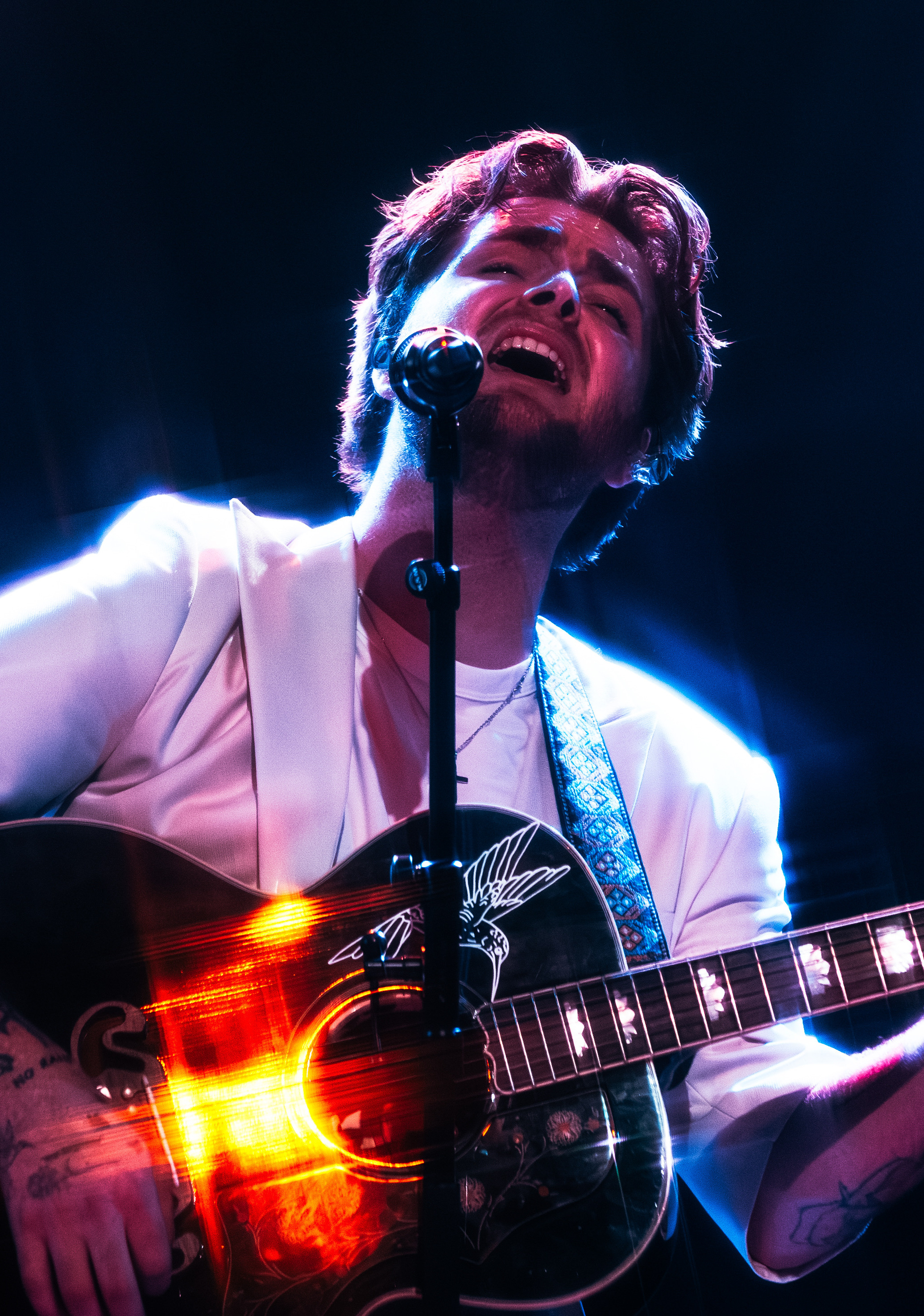
- Warren performing in 2023
- Born: Alexander Warren Hughes; September 18, 2000 (age 26); Carlsbad, California, U.S.
- Occupations: Singer; songwriter; YouTuber
- Years active: 2021–present
- Spouse: Kouvr Annon (m. 2024)
- Musical career
- Genres: Folk-pop; pop; pop-rock; Christian
- Instruments: Vocals; guitar
- Labels: Standard; Th3rd Brain; Atlantic

TikTok information
- Page: Alex Warren
- Followers: 21.7 million

YouTube information
- Channel: Alex Warren
- Genres: Prank; vlog
- Subscribers: 4.89 million
- Views: 2.63 billion
- Last updated: October 19, 2026
- Website: alexwarrenofficial.com

Alexander Warren Hughes (born September 18, 2000) is an American singer, songwriter, and YouTuber. He was a founding member of the collaborative TikTok group The Hype House from 2019 to 2022. He began independently releasing music in 2021 before signing with Atlantic Records the following year. His 2024 single "Burning Down" from his debut extended play, You'll Be Alright, Kid (Chapter 1) (2024), was his first song to appear on the Billboard Hot 100 chart. His 2025 single "Ordinary" topped the Billboard Hot 100 and numerous other charts, including in Australia, Canada, and the United Kingdom, for several weeks. He was nominated for the Grammy Award for Best New Artist in 2026.

== Early life ==
Alexander Warren Hughes was born on September 18, 2000, in Carlsbad, California. He has two sisters and one brother. His father died from kidney cancer when he was nine years old, and his mother, whom he has described as an alcoholic, kicked him out of the house at age 18, leaving him homeless and frequently sleeping in friends' cars. She died in 2021. He was raised Catholic.

== Career ==
=== Social media ===
Warren began making YouTube videos at age 10 and started posting skateboarding-focused content to Instagram in May 2015. He was a co-founder and member of the Los Angeles–based TikTok collective The Hype House, the name of which he came up with, in November 2019. By then, his YouTube channel had more than 600,000 subscribers, where he posted first-person-view prank videos, while his TikTok account had 3.8 million followers. In early 2020, social media users, particularly fans of YouTuber David Dobrik, accused Warren of copying Dobrik's video style, mannerisms, and laugh. He was nominated for the Streamy Award for First Person in 2020. Also in 2020, Warren became the host of AwesomenessTV's reality competition series Next Influencer on YouTube, in which participants lived in a TikTok content house.

Warren starred in Hype House, Netflix's reality series about the titular collective, which premiered in January 2022. His storyline primarily focused on his struggles to maintain his popularity on social media and his attempts to do so through prank videos, including staging a fake wedding with Kouvr Annon. By early 2022, his YouTube channel had more than 2.6 million subscribers, while his TikTok account had 14 million followers. He left the Hype House in 2022, which disbanded later that year. Warren said there had been a "falling out" within the collective and that he was not paid for his contributions. Also in 2022, he created the Locked in with Alex Warren podcast. By 2024, his TikTok account had more than 16.3 million followers.

=== Music ===
Warren has cited Justin Bieber and Shawn Mendes as inspirations who influenced his decision to become a musician. He has also cited Benson Boone and David Kushner among his musical influences. In June 2021, Warren independently released his debut single, "One More I Love You", which he began writing at age 13 about the death of his father. It was followed by the singles "Screaming Underwater", released in September 2021, and "Remember Me Happy". In August 2022, Warren signed a record deal with Atlantic Records and began working on the self-produced docuseries I Hope You're Proud, chronicling the period leading up to his signing. His debut single through the label, "Headlights", was released the following month. His singles "Give You Love", "Change Your Mind", and "Chasing Shadows" were released in June, July, and December 2023, respectively.

In February 2024, Warren released the single "Before You Leave Me", which became his first entry on the UK Singles Chart, peaking at number 80. His single "Save You a Seat" debuted at number 11 on Billboard's Digital Song Sales chart in April 2024, marking his first appearance on a Billboard chart. His single "Carry You Home" was released on May 31, 2024. The song became Warren's second charting single in the United Kingdom, peaking at number nine on the UK Singles Chart in April 2025, and also charted on Billboard's Pop Airplay, Adult Pop Airplay, Hot Rock & Alternative Songs, and Canadian Hot 100 charts. He performed it at the Macy's Thanksgiving Day Parade later that year. His September 2024 single "Burning Down" became his first entry on the Billboard Hot 100, peaking at number 69 in October, and was included on his debut extended play You'll Be Alright, Kid (Chapter 1). The song also peaked at number 28 on the UK Singles Chart in March 2025. A remix featuring Joe Jonas was released in December 2024. You'll Be Alright, Kid (Chapter 1) was released on September 27, 2024.

In February 2025, Warren released the single "Ordinary". It soon became popular on TikTok and, the following month, Warren performed it on the Netflix reality television series Love Is Blind's season 8 reunion episode, which was the show's first musical performance and led to an increase in streams for the song. "Ordinary" reached number one on the Billboard Hot 100 and topped the charts in several other countries, including Australia, Canada, and the United Kingdom. In the United Kingdom, it became the longest-running number-one song on the UK Singles Chart of the 2020s, surpassing Ed Sheeran's "Bad Habits", as well as the longest-running uninterrupted number-one song on the chart by an American male solo artist. Warren's international Cheaper Than Therapy Tour began in February 2025 and concluded in August 2025. In April 2025, Warren teased a collaboration with American singer Jelly Roll at the Stagecoach Festival in Indio, California, titled "Bloodline". On June 27, he released "On My Mind" with Rosé as the third pre-release single from his first album You'll Be Alright, Kid.

Warren was nominated for Best New Artist at the 68th Annual Grammy Awards and performed "Ordinary" during the ceremony in February 2026. His performance was briefly disrupted by a malfunction with his in-ear monitors, causing him to fall out of sync with the backing track before recovering and completing the performance. Also that month, Warren released the single "Fever Dream".

Warren received eight nominations at the 2026 iHeartRadio Music Awards, including Pop Artist of the Year and Song of the Year for "Ordinary". During the ceremony, he performed "Fever Dream" before accepting the Breakthrough Artist of the Year award, which he dedicated to his late parents while thanking his wife, Kouvr Annon, and his supporters.

On April 4, 2026, Warren began his Finding Family on the Road Tour, his first arena tour, which visited North America, Europe, Asia, and Oceania.

In June 2026, Warren announced his second studio album, Wildchild, scheduled for release on August 28, 2026, through Atlantic Records. The album was preceded by the singles "Passenger", "Fine Place to Die",, "Fever Dream", and "Rescuer". Warren hosted the Nickelodeon Kids' Choice Awards on November 14, 2026.

== Personal life ==
=== Mental health and faith ===
Warren has been open about his struggles with anxiety, detailing his experiences in songs such as "Headlights". He has also spoken about experiencing depression following his mother’s death in 2021. Raised Catholic, Warren now identifies as a Protestant Christian and has said that his faith and worship music have influenced both his personal life and songwriting. He has described music as a form of therapy that helped him process grief and childhood trauma.

=== Marriage ===
Warren began dating Kouvr Annon, a fellow former member of the Hype House whom he met on Snapchat, in 2018. At the time they met, Warren was homeless and living in his car. Four months later, Annon moved from her parents’ home in Hawaii to California to live with him. The couple became engaged on New Year's Eve in 2022 and married on June 22, 2024, in Escondido, California. Warren has said that Annon inspired several of his songs, including "Carry You Home" and "Ordinary". They reside in Nashville, Tennessee.

== Filmography ==
Year	Title	Role	Notes
2026	The Voice	Himself	Advisor for Team Adam (season 30)
2026	Kids' Choice Awards	Himself (host)	Television special

Music videos

Year	Title	Artist(s)	Role	Ref.
2026	"Do Me Right"	Mr. Fantasy	Himself	

== Discography ==
- You'll Be Alright, Kid (2025)
- Wildchild (2026)

== Tours ==
- Cheaper Than Therapy (2025)
- Finding Family on the Road (2026)

== Awards and nominations ==
Awards	Year	Category	Work	Result	Ref.
American Music Awards	2026	Best Vocal Performance	"Ordinary"	Nominated	
American Music Awards	2026	New Artist of the Year	Himself	Nominated	
American Music Awards	2026	Best Male Pop Artist	Himself	Nominated	
American Music Awards	2026	Best Pop Song	"Ordinary"	Nominated	
American Music Awards	2026	Song of the Summer	"Fever Dream"	Nominated	
American Music Awards	2026	Song of the Year	"Ordinary"	Nominated	
IHeartRadio Music Awards	2024	Social Star Award	Himself	Nominated	
IHeartRadio Music Awards	2026	Song of the Year	"Ordinary"	Won	
IHeartRadio Music Awards	2026	Breakthrough Artist of the Year	Himself	Won	
IHeartRadio Music Awards	2026	Best New Pop Artist	Himself	Won	
IHeartRadio Music Awards	2026	Favorite Debut Album	You'll Be Alright, Kid	Won	
IHeartRadio Music Awards	2026	Pop Artist of the Year	Himself	Nominated	
IHeartRadio Music Awards	2026	Pop Song of the Year	"Ordinary"	Nominated	
IHeartRadio Music Awards	2026	Best Lyrics	"Ordinary"	Nominated	
IHeartRadio Music Awards	2026	Best Music Video	"Ordinary"	Nominated	
IHeartRadio Music Awards	2026	Favorite K-pop Collab	"On My Mind" (with Rosé)	Nominated	
Grammy Awards	2026	Best New Artist	Himself	Nominated	
Los 40 Music Awards	2025	Best International New Act	Himself	Nominated	
Los 40 Music Awards	2025	Best International Song	"Ordinary"	Nominated	
MTV Video Music Awards	2025	Best New Artist	Himself	Won	
MTV Video Music Awards	2025	Song of the Year	"Ordinary"	Nominated	
MTV Video Music Awards	2025	Best Pop	"Ordinary"	Nominated	
MTV Video Music Awards	2025	Song of Summer	"Ordinary"	Nominated	
Nickelodeon Kids' Choice Awards	2025	Favorite Viral Song	"Ordinary"	Nominated	
Nickelodeon Kids' Choice Awards	2025	Favorite Male Breakout Artist	Himself	Nominated	
NRJ Music Awards	2025	International Breakthrough of the Year	Himself	Won	
Swiss Music Awards	2026	Best International Solo Act	Himself	Won	
Swiss Music Awards	2026	Best International Breaking Act	Himself	Won	
Swiss Music Awards	2026	Best International Hit	"Ordinary"	Won	
We Love Awards	2025	Mainstream Impact Award	"Bloodline"	Nominated	
