= Burning Down =

2024 single by Alex Warren

Single by Alex Warren

from the EP You'll Be Alright, Kid (Chapter 1)
- Released: September 20, 2024
- Length: 2:59
- Label: Atlantic
- Songwriters: Alexander Hughes; Aaron Yaron; Cal Shapiro; Mags Duval
- Producer: Yaron

Alex Warren singles chronology
"Troubled Waters" (2024)	"Burning Down" (2024)	"Ordinary" (2025)

Joe Jonas singles chronology
"¿Cómo Pasó?" (2024)	"Burning Down" (2024)	"All I Forgot" (2025)

"Burning Down" is a song by American singer-songwriter Alex Warren. It was released through Atlantic Records as the seventh single from his debut extended play, You'll Be Alright, Kid (Chapter 1), on September 20, 2024. He wrote the song with producer Aaron Yaron, alongside Cal Shapiro and Mags Duval. Another version of the song is in collaboration with fellow American singer-songwriter Joe Jonas and was released on December 6, 2024. The song became Warren's first entry on the Billboard Hot 100 as it debuted at number 76 on the chart.

== Background ==
Alex Warren teased the song on video-sharing app TikTok leading up to its release. According to Luminate, the song received 6.6 million official U.S. streams and 3,000 downloads sold through September 26, 2024. By October 2024, it soundtracked over 90,000 clips on TikTok. On July 23, 2025, the single was certified platinum by the RIAA in the United States.

== Charts ==
=== Weekly charts ===
Weekly chart performance for "Burning Down"
Chart (2024–2025)	Peak position
Australia (ARIA)	47
Belarus Airplay (TopHit)	152
Belgium (Ultratop 50 Flanders)	5
Canada Hot 100 (Billboard)	44
Canada CHR/Top 40 (Billboard)	23
Canada Hot AC (Billboard)	35
CIS Airplay (TopHit)	173
Czech Republic Airplay (ČNS IFPI)	14
Denmark Airplay (Tracklisten)	7
Global 200 (Billboard)	136
Ireland (IRMA)	21
Lithuania Airplay (TopHit)	85
Lithuania Airplay (TopHit) Joe Jonas version	159
Netherlands (Dutch Top 40)	7
Netherlands (Single Top 100)	18
New Zealand (Recorded Music NZ)	31
Norway (VG-lista)	15
Poland (Polish Airplay Top 100) Joe Jonas version	19
Romania Airplay (TopHit) Joe Jonas version	85
Serbia Airplay (Radiomonitor)	16
Sweden (Sverigetopplistan)	73
Switzerland (Schweizer Hitparade)	76
UK Singles (Official Charts)	23
US Billboard Hot 100	69
US Adult Pop Airplay (Billboard)	28
US Pop Airplay (Billboard)	21

=== Monthly charts ===
Monthly chart performance for "Burning Down"
Chart (2025)	Peak position
Czech Republic (Rádio Top 100)	19

=== Year-end charts ===
2024 year-end chart performance for "Burning Down"
Chart (2024)	Position
Netherlands (Dutch Top 40)	91

2025 year-end chart performance for "Burning Down"
Chart (2025)	Position
Australia (ARIA)	77
Belgium (Ultratop 50 Flanders)	34
Canada CHR/Top 40 (Billboard)	90
Netherlands (Dutch Top 40)	43
Netherlands (Single Top 100)	52

== Certifications ==
Certifications for "Burning Down"
Region	Certification	Certified units/sales
Australia (ARIA)	Platinum	70,000^{‡}
Canada (Music Canada)	3× Platinum	240,000^{‡}
Denmark (IFPI Danmark)	Gold	45,000^{‡}
Netherlands (NVPI)	Platinum	93,000^{‡}
New Zealand (RMNZ)	2× Platinum	60,000^{‡}
United Kingdom (BPI)	Platinum	600,000^{‡}
United States (RIAA)	Platinum	1,000,000^{‡}
^{‡} Sales+streaming figures based on certification alone.
