= Before You Leave Me =

2024 single by Alex Warren

Single by Alex Warren

from the album You'll Be Alright, Kid (Chapter 1)
- Released: February 16, 2024
- Length: 2:56
- Label: Atlantic
- Songwriters: Alexander Hughes; Aaron Yaron; Charlie Oriain; Ronald Spreckley
- Producer: Yaron

Alex Warren singles chronology
"Yard Sale" (2023)	"Before You Leave Me" (2024)	"Save You a Seat" (2024)

Music video
- "Before You Leave Me" on YouTube

"Before You Leave Me" is a song by American singer-songwriter Alex Warren, released on February 16, 2024, through Atlantic Records as the third single from his debut extended play You'll Be Alright, Kid (Chapter 1) (2024). It was written by Warren himself, the producer Aaron Yaron, Charlie Oriain and Ronald Spreckley.

== Background ==
According to Alex Warren, he wanted to write a sad song "that you can dance to" and was inspired by his relationship in middle school. Regarding the nature of "Before You Leave Me", he said "It's a long-distance relationship song, it's a breakup song, and it's a song about losing someone. The whole gist of it is that you have one last night with someone, and it's about making the best of that last night that you have." Warren also shared a message about the song:

Anyone who knows my story knows that my relationship with my fiancée started off long distance. And people who have been in a long distance relationship understand those often unspoken fears that come with those frequent good-byes and returns to time apart. I wrote this track as a way to help people process and vocalize the emotions that come along when it's time for couples to return to long distance after a visit. I'm so grateful that my long distance relationship worked out and has since turned into the single most important part of my life. I hope that everyone who gets to hear this song and is currently struggling gains comfort from knowing that they're not alone and that while it may be hard now, a fairy tale ending is possible for everyone.

== Music video ==
The music video was released alongside the single. Directed by Hunter Moreno, it is in the style of Bridgerton and The Greatest Showman.

== Charts ==
=== Weekly charts ===
Weekly chart performance for "Before You Leave Me"
Chart (2024)	Peak position
Australia (ARIA)	20
Austria (Ö3 Austria Top 40)	50
Belgium (Ultratop 50 Flanders)	10
Ireland (IRMA)	41
Netherlands (Dutch Top 40)	5
Netherlands (Single Top 100)	13
Norway (VG-lista)	28
Portugal (AFP)	120
Sweden (Sverigetopplistan)	34
Switzerland (Schweizer Hitparade)	24
UK Singles (Official Charts)	80

=== Year-end charts ===
2024 year-end chart performance for "Before You Leave Me"
Chart (2024)	Position
Belgium (Ultratop 50 Flanders)	25
Netherlands (Dutch Top 40)	35
Netherlands (Single Top 100)	68

2025 year-end chart performance for "Before You Leave Me"
Chart (2025)	Position
Belgium (Ultratop 50 Flanders)	122

== Certifications ==
Certifications for "Before You Leave Me"
Region	Certification	Certified units/sales
Australia (ARIA)	Platinum	70,000^{‡}
Austria (IFPI Austria)	Platinum	30,000^{‡}
Belgium (BRMA)	Gold	20,000^{‡}
Canada (Music Canada)	3× Platinum	240,000^{‡}
Denmark (IFPI Danmark)	Gold	45,000^{‡}
Netherlands (NVPI)	Platinum	93,000^{‡}
New Zealand (RMNZ)	Gold	15,000^{‡}
United Kingdom (BPI)	Platinum	600,000^{‡}
United States (RIAA)	Gold	500,000^{‡}
^{‡} Sales+streaming figures based on certification alone.
