= Ordinary (Alex Warren song) =

Single by Alex Warren

from the album You'll Be Alright, Kid
- Released: February 7, 2025
- Recorded: December 10, 2024
- Genre: Chamber pop
- Length: 3:06
- Label: Atlantic
- Songwriters: Alexander Hughes; Adam Yaron; Cal Shapiro; Mags Duval
- Producer: Yaron

Alex Warren singles chronology
"Burning Down" (2024)	"Ordinary" (2025)	"Bloodline" (2025)

Music video
- "Ordinary" on YouTube

"Ordinary" is a song by American singer-songwriter Alex Warren. It was released on February 7, 2025, through Atlantic Records as the lead single from his debut studio album, You'll Be Alright, Kid. Warren wrote the song with producer Adam Yaron, alongside Cal Shapiro and Mags Duval.

"Ordinary" became Warren’s breakthrough global hit and one of the defining songs of 2025. The song topped the Billboard Hot 100 for 10 weeks and achieved historic success on U.S. Top 40 radio, spending a record-breaking 16 non-consecutive weeks at number one on Billboard's Pop Airplay chart, surpassing the previous all-time record of 14 weeks set by "The Sign" by Ace of Base in 1994. "Ordinary" became one of the most-played radio songs of the year across multiple formats and was named Billboard's Song of the Summer for 2025. In the United Kingdom, the single spent 13 non-consecutive weeks atop the UK Singles Chart, breaking a 70-year-old record previously associated with Elvis Presley for the longest-running UK number-one by an American male solo artist. Despite of the commercial success, the song received generally negative reviews from music critics, who criticized it as unoriginal.

"Ordinary" also topped the Billboard Global 200 for ten straight weeks, while reaching number one in over 30 countries. It also peaked within the top ten of the charts in Croatia, France, Italy, Lebanon, South Africa, and Sweden. It was the best-selling song of 2025 in Australia, Iceland, the Netherlands, New Zealand, Switzerland, and the United Kingdom, as well as the fourth best-selling song of 2025 globally. It is certified Diamond in Canada and France as well as Platinum or higher in thirteen additional countries.

== Composition ==
"Ordinary" talks about the feeling of loving somebody "who makes life extraordinary".

== Critical reception ==
The song received mixed to unfavorable reviews from music critics. Paste named it the sixth-worst song of 2025 and criticized it for sounding as "if someone fed Imagine Dragons' entire discography into ChatGPT". The New Yorker's Sheldon Pearce described it as "pummeling" and "gray", "distinctly middle-aged, destined to be played at dentist’s offices and wedding receptions from now until the end of time." Vulture believed that its lyrics had "religious and classical metaphors that wouldn't make it out of a high-school creative writing class."

== Chart performance ==
In the United States, the song topped the Billboard Hot 100 for 10 non-consecutive weeks, becoming the second song in 2025 to spend at least ten weeks at number one on that chart. On the Billboard Pop Airplay chart, the song broke the record for the longest-running number-one song in the chart's history with 16 non-consecutive weeks at number one.

In the United Kingdom, "Ordinary" spent 13 non-consecutive weeks at number one, surpassing Ed Sheeran's 11-week reign with "Bad Habits" to become the longest-running number one of the 2020s (later surpassed by Sam Fender and Olivia Dean's "Rein Me In"). "Ordinary"'s initial 12-week run at the top gives Alex Warren the longest consecutive run at number one on the UK Singles Chart by any American male artist to date.

== Music video ==
The music video was released alongside the song on February 7, 2025, and features Warren's wife, Kouvr Annon. He is seen chasing her through different places, including a forest, a beach, and a desert, before they finally catch up. At the end, both levitate towards the sky.

== Commercial and live performances ==
The song received a significant boost in streaming, sales, and Shazams after Warren performed it on season 8 of the reality television show Love Is Blind. The song was also featured on the July 28, 2025, edition of WWE Raw, used as part of a video package to remember the life of professional wrestling icon and WWE Hall of Famer, Hulk Hogan who had died a few days prior on July 24. It was also used by Fox Footy on January 23, 2026, to advertise their then-upcoming coverage of the 2026 AFL season.

Warren performed the song live at Lollapalooza 2025 with country singer Luke Combs. This version was released as a promotional single on August 4.

== Charts ==
=== Weekly charts ===
Weekly chart performance
Chart (2025–2026)	Peak position
Argentina Anglo Airplay (Monitor Latino)	8
Australia (ARIA)	1
Austria (Ö3 Austria Top 40)	1
Belarus Airplay (TopHit)	1
Belgium (Ultratop 50 Flanders)	1
Belgium (Ultratop 50 Wallonia)	1
Bolivia Anglo Airplay (Monitor Latino)	3
Brazil Hot 100 (Billboard)	18
Bulgaria Airplay (PROPHON)	3
Canada Hot 100 (Billboard)	1
Canada AC (Billboard)	1
Canada CHR/Top 40 (Billboard)	1
Canada Hot AC (Billboard)	1
Canada Modern Rock (Billboard)	29
Central America Anglo Airplay (Monitor Latino)	3
Chile Anglo Airplay (Monitor Latino)	4
Colombia Anglo Airplay (National-Report)	1
CIS Airplay (TopHit)	1
Costa Rica Anglo Airplay (Monitor Latino)	4
Croatia International Airplay (Top lista)	3
Czech Republic Airplay (ČNS IFPI)	1
Czech Republic Singles Digital (ČNS IFPI)	1
Denmark (Tracklisten)	1
Dominican Republic Anglo Airplay (Monitor Latino)	1
Ecuador Anglo Airplay (Monitor Latino)	2
Estonia Airplay (TopHit)	1
Finland (Suomen virallinen lista)	31
France (SNEP)	10
Germany (GfK)	1
Global 200 (Billboard)	1
Greece International (IFPI)	1
Guatemala Anglo Airplay (Monitor Latino)	5
Honduras Anglo Airplay (Monitor Latino)	9
Hungary (Rádiós Top 40)	1
Hungary (Single Top 40)	5
Iceland (Tónlistinn)	1
India International (IMI)	3
Ireland (IRMA)	1
Israel (Mako Hitlist)	14
Italy (FIMI)	7
Jamaica Airplay (JAMMS)	10
Japan Hot 100 (Billboard)	40
Kazakhstan Airplay (TopHit)	6
Latin America Anglo Airplay (Monitor Latino)	2
Latvia Airplay (LaIPA)	1
Latvia Streaming (LaIPA)	1
Lebanon (Lebanese Top 20)	2
Lithuania (AGATA)	15
Lithuania Airplay (TopHit)	1
Luxembourg (Billboard)	1
Malaysia International (RIM)	18
Malta Airplay (Radiomonitor)	1
Mexico Airplay (Monitor Latino)	12
Middle East and North Africa (IFPI)	17
Moldova Airplay (TopHit)	1
Netherlands (Dutch Top 40)	1
Netherlands (Single Top 100)	1
New Zealand (Recorded Music NZ)	1
Nicaragua Anglo Airplay (Monitor Latino)	2
Nigeria (TurnTable Top 100)	37
Nigeria Airplay (TurnTable)	28
North Macedonia Airplay (Radiomonitor)	2
Norway (VG-lista)	1
Panama International (PRODUCE)	27
Paraguay Airplay (Monitor Latino)	13
Peru Airplay (Monitor Latino)	18
Philippines Hot 100 (Billboard Philippines)	81
Poland Airplay (OLiS)	1
Poland Streaming (OLiS)	8
Portugal (AFP)	1
Puerto Rico Anglo Airplay (Monitor Latino)	1
Romania Airplay (UPFR)	1
Romania Airplay (Media Forest)	1
Romania TV Airplay (Media Forest)	2
Russia Airplay (TopHit)	6
San Marino Airplay (SMRTV Top 50)	13
Serbia Airplay (Radiomonitor)	6
Singapore (RIAS)	11
Slovakia Airplay (ČNS IFPI)	1
Slovakia Singles Digital (ČNS IFPI)	3
Slovenia Airplay (Radiomonitor)	1
South Africa Airplay (TOSAC)	1
South Africa Streaming (TOSAC)	2
Spain (Promusicae)	35
Suriname (Nationale Top 40)	10
Sweden (Sverigetopplistan)	2
Switzerland (Schweizer Hitparade)	1
Ukraine Airplay (TopHit)	1
United Arab Emirates (IFPI)	5
UK Singles (Official Charts)	1
Uruguay Airplay (Monitor Latino)	15
US Billboard Hot 100	1
US Adult Contemporary (Billboard)	1
US Adult Pop Airplay (Billboard)	1
US Dance Airplay (Billboard)	28
US Pop Airplay (Billboard)	1
Venezuela Airplay (Record Report)	38
Vietnam (IFPI)	13
Vietnam Hot 100 (Billboard)	16

Live from Lollapalooza
Chart (2025)	Peak position
New Zealand Hot Singles (RMNZ)	7
US Hot Country Songs (Billboard)	39

=== Monthly charts ===
Monthly chart performance
Chart (2025–2026)	Peak position
Belarus Airplay (TopHit)	1
Brazil Streaming (Pro-Música Brasil)	15
CIS Airplay (TopHit)	1
Estonia Airplay (TopHit)	2
Kazakhstan Airplay (TopHit)	7
Lithuania Airplay (TopHit)	1
Moldova Airplay (TopHit)	1
Panama Streaming (PRODUCE)	80
Paraguay Airplay (SGP)	23
Romania Airplay (TopHit)	2
Russia Airplay (TopHit)	8
Ukraine Airplay (TopHit)	2

=== Year-end charts ===
Year-end chart performance
Chart (2025)	Position
Argentina Anglo Airplay (Monitor Latino)	22
Australia (ARIA)	1
Austria (Ö3 Austria Top 40)	2
Belarus Airplay (TopHit)	34
Belgium (Ultratop 50 Flanders)	2
Belgium (Ultratop 50 Wallonia)	2
Canada (Canadian Hot 100)	2
Canada AC (Billboard)	13
Canada CHR/Top 40 (Billboard)	5
Canada Hot AC (Billboard)	10
Canada Modern Rock (Billboard)	98
Chile Airplay (Monitor Latino)	99
CIS Airplay (TopHit)	2
Czech Republic Singles Digital (ČNS IFPI)	4
Estonia Airplay (TopHit)	1
Germany (GfK)	4
Global 200 (Billboard)	4
Hungary (Rádiós Top 40)	27
Hungary (Single Top 40)	18
Iceland (Tónlistinn)	1
Italy (FIMI)	17
Kazakhstan Airplay (TopHit)	28
Lithuania Airplay (TopHit)	1
Moldova Airplay (TopHit)	16
Netherlands (Dutch Top 40)	1
Netherlands (Single Top 100)	1
New Zealand (Recorded Music NZ)	1
Poland (Polish Airplay Top 100)	1
Poland (Polish Streaming Top 100)	10
Romania Airplay (TopHit)	4
Russia Airplay (TopHit)	22
Slovakia Singles Digital (ČNS IFPI)	6
Sweden (Sverigetopplistan)	3
Switzerland (Schweizer Hitparade)	1
UK Singles (OCC)	1
Ukraine Airplay (FDR)	24
US Billboard Hot 100	7
US Adult Contemporary (Billboard)	10
US Adult Pop Airplay (Billboard)	6
US Pop Airplay (Billboard)	3

== Certifications ==
Certifications
Region	Certification	Certified units/sales
Australia (ARIA)	10× Platinum	700,000^{‡}
Austria (IFPI Austria)	4× Platinum	120,000^{‡}
Canada (Music Canada)	Diamond	800,000^{‡}
Denmark (IFPI Danmark)	3× Platinum	270,000^{‡}
France (SNEP)	Diamond	333,333^{‡}
Germany (BVMI)	Platinum	600,000^{‡}
Italy (FIMI)	2× Platinum	400,000^{‡}
Netherlands (NVPI)	Diamond	232,500^{‡}
New Zealand (RMNZ)	7× Platinum	210,000^{‡}
Poland (ZPAV)	3× Platinum	375,000^{‡}
Portugal (AFP)	6× Platinum	150,000^{‡}
Spain (Promusicae)	2× Platinum	200,000^{‡}
Switzerland (IFPI Switzerland)	Platinum	30,000^{‡}
United Kingdom (BPI)	5× Platinum	3,000,000^{‡}
United States (RIAA)	3× Platinum	3,000,000^{‡}
Streaming
Czech Republic (ČNS IFPI)	Platinum	5,000,000
Greece (IFPI Greece)	2× Platinum	4,000,000^{†}
Slovakia (ČNS IFPI)	Platinum	1,700,000
^{‡} Sales+streaming figures based on certification alone.^{†} Streaming-only figures based on certification alone.

== Accolades ==
Awards and nominations for "Ordinary"
Organisation	Year	Category	Result	Ref.
MTV Video Music Awards	2025	Song of the Year	Nominated	
MTV Video Music Awards	2025	Best Pop	Nominated	

== Release history ==
Release history and formats for "Ordinary"
Region	Date	Format(s)	Version(s)	Label	Ref.
United States	April 1, 2025	Contemporary hit radio	Original	Atlantic	

== See also ==
- List of Billboard Hot 100 number ones of 2025
- List of Canadian Hot 100 number-one singles of 2025
- List of number-one singles from the 2020s (New Zealand)
- List of number-one singles of 2025 (Australia)
- List of number-one singles of 2025 (Ireland)
- List of number-one singles of 2025 (Portugal)
- List of UK Singles Chart number ones of the 2020s
