= Sombr discography =

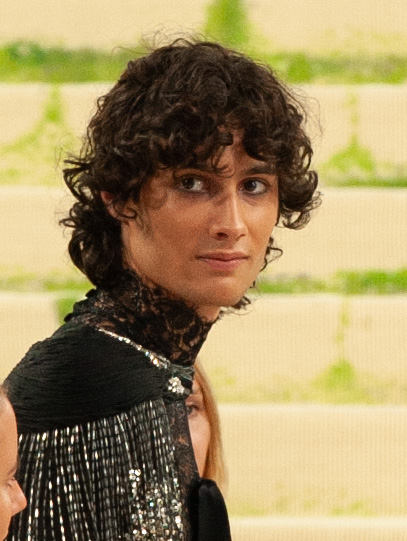
- Sombr at the 2026 Met Gala
- Studio albums: 1
- EPs: 1
- Singles: 23

The discography of American singer-songwriter Sombr (sometimes styled in lowercase) consists of one studio album, one extended play, and 23 singles. The singer, born Shane Boose, began his music career with the release of his debut single "Nothing Left to Say" in October 2021, and eventually signed with Warner Records, after which he released his debut extended play In Another Life in September 2023.

In 2025, his singles "Back to Friends" (2024) and "Undressed" (2025) concurrently gained massive popularity on TikTok and entered the Billboard Global 200 and Billboard Hot 100, eventually peaking within the top 20 on both charts. He released his debut studio album I Barely Know Her in August 2025, preceded by the two aforementioned singles as well as two follow-up singles "We Never Dated" and "12 to 12", with the latter marking his third top 50 entry on the Global 200 and the Hot 100. The album reached the top ten in multiple countries, including the United States. Following his debut album, he released "Homewrecker" in February 2026, which has entered the top ten in several countries.

== Studio albums ==
List of studio albums, with selected details and chart positions
Title	Album details	Peak chart positions										Units	Certifications
Title	Album details	US	AUS	AUT	CAN	GER	IRE	NZ	NOR	SWE	UK	Units	Certifications
I Barely Know Her	Release date: August 22, 2025; Labels: SMB, Warner; Formats: CD, download, streaming, vinyl	10	4	6	8	12	6	3	4	4	10	US: 116,000 (as of September 18, 2025) (Note: Billboard has only reported the first four weeks units of the album, with the latest one being for the chart dated September 27, 2025, which tracked the album's performance on September 12-18, 2025.)	ARIA: Gold; BPI: Gold; IFPI AUT: Gold; MC: 2× Platinum; RMNZ: Platinum

== Extended plays ==
List of EPs, with selected details
Title	Details
In Another Life	Release date: September 15, 2023; Labels: SMB, Warner; Formats: Download, streaming, vinyl

== Singles ==
=== As lead artist ===
List of singles as lead artist, with year released, selected chart positions, certifications, and album name shown
Title	Year	Peak chart positions										Certifications	Album
Title	Year	US	AUS	AUT	CAN	IRE	NZ	NOR	SWE	UK	WW	Certifications	Album
"Nothing Left to Say"	2021	—	—	—	—	—	—	—	—	—	—		Non-album singles
"Fine"	2022	—	—	—	—	—	—	—	—	—	—		Non-album singles
"Through It All"	2022	—	—	—	—	—	—	—	—	—	—		Non-album singles
"Caroline"	2022	—	—	—	—	—	—	—	—	—	—		Non-album singles
"Willow"	2022	—	—	—	—	—	—	—	—	—	—		Non-album singles
"Weak"	2023	—	—	—	—	—	—	—	—	—	—		In Another Life
"Alibi"	2023	—	—	—	—	—	—	—	—	—	—		Non-album singles
"Never Find You"	2023	—	—	—	—	—	—	—	—	—	—		Non-album singles
"Silhouette"	2023	—	—	—	—	—	—	—	—	—	—		In Another Life
"My House Is Warm"	2023	—	—	—	—	—	—	—	—	—	—		In Another Life
"Would've Been You"	2023	—	—	—	—	—	—	—	—	—	—	ARIA: Platinum; BPI: Silver; MC: Platinum; RMNZ: Gold	Non-album singles
"I Don't Know You Anymore"	2023	—	—	—	—	—	—	—	—	—	—	ARIA: Gold; MC: Gold	Non-album singles
"In Your Arms"	2024	—	—	—	—	—	—	—	—	—	—		Non-album singles
"I'll Remember Tonight"	2024	—	—	—	—	—	—	—	—	—	—		Non-album singles
"Savior"	2024	—	—	—	—	—	—	—	—	—	—		Non-album singles
"Perfume"	2024	—	—	—	—	—	—	—	—	—	—		Non-album singles
"Do I Ever Cross Your Mind"	2024	—	—	—	—	—	—	—	—	—	—	ARIA: Platinum; BPI: Silver; MC: Gold; RMNZ: Gold	Non-album singles
"Makes Me Want You"	2024	—	—	—	—	—	—	—	—	—	—		Non-album singles
"Back to Friends"	2024	7	3	3	9	4	4	12	7	7	5	RIAA: Platinum; ARIA: 6× Platinum; BPI: 2× Platinum; IFPI AUT: 2× Platinum; MC: 7× Platinum; RMNZ: 4× Platinum	I Barely Know Her
"Undressed"	2025	16	2	8	14	1	2	6	15	4	11	RIAA: Platinum; ARIA: 5× Platinum; BPI: 2× Platinum; IFPI AUT: Platinum; MC: 4× Platinum; RMNZ: 3× Platinum	I Barely Know Her
"We Never Dated"	2025	— (Note: "We Never Dated" did not enter the Billboard Hot 100, but peaked at number 4 on the Bubbling Under Hot 100 chart.)	60	—	83	35	— (Note: "We Never Dated" did not enter the NZ Top 40 Singles Chart, but peaked at number 4 on the NZ Hot Singles Chart.)	98	—	37	140	ARIA: Platinum; BPI: Silver; MC: Platinum; RMNZ: Gold	I Barely Know Her
"12 to 12"	2025	41	6	4	25	4	10	5	6	7	22	ARIA: 3× Platinum; BPI: 2× Platinum; IFPI AUT: Platinum; MC: 3× Platinum; RMNZ: 2× Platinum	I Barely Know Her
"Homewrecker"	2026	15	6	20	6	4	10	19	22	4	21	ARIA: 2× Platinum; BPI: Platinum; IFPI AUT: Gold; MC: 2× Platinum; RMNZ: Platinum	TBA
"Potential"	2026	61	60	—	57	28	—	55	68	31	115		TBA
"My Body Isn't Ready"	2026	26	24	7	14	1	11	11	8	3	34	ARIA: Gold; BPI: Silver; MC: Platinum; RMNZ: Gold	TBA
"—" denotes a recording that did not chart in that territory.

=== As featured artist ===
List of singles as featured artist, with year released and album name
Title	Year	Album
"All I Ever Asked" (Rachel Chinouriri featuring Sombr)	2025	Non-album single

=== Promotional singles ===
List of promotional singles, with year released and album name shown
Title	Year	Album
"I Wish I Knew How to Quit You" / "Canal Street"	2026	I Barely Know Her

== Other charted songs ==
List of other charted songs, with chart position, showing year released and album name
Title	Year	Peak chart positions								Album
Title	Year	US Rock	AUS	CZR	LAT Air.	LBN Eng.	NZ Hot	NOR	SWE Heat.	Album
"Crushing"	2025	36	—	—	—	—	8	—	—	I Barely Know Her
"I Wish I Knew How to Quit You"	2025	24	98	5	—	19	4	70	11	I Barely Know Her
"Canal Street"	2025	—	—	—	—	—	29	—	—	I Barely Know Her
"Come Closer"	2025	—	—	—	17	—	—	—	—	I Barely Know Her
"—" denotes a recording that did not chart in that territory.

== Music videos ==
List of music videos, showing year released and director name
Title	Year	Director	Ref.
"Weak"	2023	Unknown	
"Burner Phone"	2023	Gus Black	
"Would've Been You"	2024	Gus Black	
"I'll Remember Tonight"	2024	Sombr	
"Back to Friends"	2025	Gus Black	
"Undressed"	2025	Gus Black	
"12 to 12"	2025	Gus Black	
"Homewrecker"	2026	Gus Black	
"Potential"	2026	Gus Black	
"My Body Isn't Ready"	2026	Gus Black	
