= Potential (Sombr song) =

Single by Sombr
- Released: April 17, 2026
- Genre: Synth-pop; alternative pop
- Length: 4:03
- Label: SMB; Warner
- Songwriter: Shane Boose
- Producers: Sombr; Tony Berg

Sombr singles chronology
"Homewrecker" (2026)	"Potential" (2026)	"My Body Isn't Ready" (2026)

Music video
- "Potential" on YouTube

"Potential" is a song by American singer-songwriter Sombr, released on April 17, 2026, through Warner Records and Sombr's own imprint SMB. Sombr wrote and produced the song, alongside co-production by Tony Berg.

== Background and release ==
Sombr released his debut studio album, I Barely Know Her on August 22, 2025, to positive critical reception. Following the release of four singles in promotion of the album, he released "Homewrecker", his first new single, on February 5, 2026.

On September 15, 2025, Sombr was announced as part of the line-up for the 2026 Coachella Festival, performing on the Outdoor Theatre stage. His weekend one set took place on April 11, 2026, where he performed the song live for the first time. The song was officially released a few days later, on April 17.

== Composition ==
"Potential" is a synth-pop and alternative pop song in which Sombr reflects on a lost relationship and the impact that no longer being in the relationship has on him.

== Critical reception ==
Andrew Unterberger of Billboard opined that the song reprised where "12 to 12" concluded, with "some Random Access Memories by Daft Punk-style" vocoder "warbling" with "more heartbroken lyrics".

== Music video ==
The music video, directed by Gus Black, was released concurrently with the song on Sombr's official YouTube channel, starring the latter alongside actors Madeline Argy and Gavin Casalegno in a "Bonnie and Clyde" inspired story.

== Charts ==
=== Weekly charts ===
Weekly chart performance
Chart (2026)	Peak position
Australia (ARIA)	60
Canada Hot 100 (Billboard)	57
Croatia International Airplay (Top lista)	26
Czech Republic Airplay (ČNS IFPI)	13
Estonia Airplay (TopHit)	61
Global 200 (Billboard)	115
Ireland (IRMA)	28
Italy Airplay (EarOne)	12
Latvia Airplay (LaIPA)	10
Lithuania Airplay (TopHit)	40
Netherlands (Single Tip)	2
Nicaragua Anglo Airplay (Monitor Latino)	5
Norway (VG-lista)	55
San Marino Airplay (SMRTV Top 50)	12
Sweden (Sverigetopplistan)	68
UK Singles (Official Charts)	31
US Billboard Hot 100	61
US Hot Rock & Alternative Songs (Billboard)	12

=== Monthly charts ===
Monthly chart performance
Chart (2026)	Peak position
Estonia Airplay (TopHit)	67
Latvia Airplay (TopHit)	75
Lithuania Airplay (TopHit)	99

== Release history ==
Release dates and formats for "Potential"
Region	Date	Format	Label	Ref.
Various	April 17, 2026	Digital download; streaming	SMB; Warner	
Italy	April 17, 2026	Radio airplay	Warner	
United Kingdom	April 17, 2026	Radio airplay	Warner	
