= The Late Nights & Young Romance Tour =

2025–2026 concert tour by Sombr

- Tour by Sombr
- Location: Australia; Europe; North America
- Associated album: I Barely Know Her
- Start date: May 25, 2025
- End date: March 16, 2026
- Legs: 4
- No. of shows: 68
- Supporting acts: Anna Leah; Devon Gabriella; Blu DeTiger
- Website: www.sombrmusic.com

Sombr concert chronology
- The Late Nights & Young Romance Tour (2025–2026); You Are The Reason Tour (2026-2027)

The Late Nights & Young Romance Tour was the debut concert tour by American singer-songwriter Sombr in support of his debut studio album, I Barely Know Her (2025). It began on May 25, 2025, in Dublin, with shows across Australia, North America and Europe. The tour concluded in Dublin on March 16, 2026, comprising 68 shows. Anna Leah, Devon Gabriella, Blu DeTiger and Charlotte Lawrence served as opening acts.

The tour featured duet performances with guest appearances from Sam Smith, Foster the People, Laufey, and Cigarettes After Sex. On the final night of the tour, Sombr performed the Cranberries' song "Linger" (1993) alongside founding members of the band, Mike and Noel Hogan, in Dublin, Ireland.

== Background ==
In 2025, Sombr achieved mainstream recognition with the release of the singles "Back to Friends" and "Undressed". On August 22, 2025, he released his debut studio album I Barely Know Her, which was met with widespread critical acclaim. Rolling Stone described the record as “everything pop has been missing,” while Variety noted that “he sounds like he’s stepped out of the bedroom and onto the big stage, bursting with ideas and equipped with the skills to see them through.” To promote the album, Sombr performed "Back to Friends" in a live appearance on Canal Street in New York City the same day.

Earlier in the year, Sombr had embarked on a series of European concerts, including multiple sold-out shows in London, Amsterdam, and Cologne. Following these performances, in April 2025 he announced his first headlining tour, titled The Late Nights & Young Romance Tour. The North American leg was scheduled to begin on September 21, 2025, featuring over twenty dates across the United States and Canada with singer-songwriter Devon Gabriella as the supporting act.

== Set list ==
This set list was taken from the show in Madrid on February 24, 2026. It does not represent all shows throughout the tour.

1. "I Wish I Knew How to Quit You"
2. "We Never Dated"
3. "Savior"
4. "Perfume"
5. "Do I Ever Cross Your Mind"
6. "Come Closer"
7. "In Your Arms"
8. "Undressed"
9. "Caroline"
10. "Dime"
11. "Would've Been You"
12. "Homewrecker"
13. "Canal Street"
14. "Crushing"
15. "Under the Mat"
16. "Back to Friends"
17. "12 to 12"

== Tour dates ==
List of 2025 concerts, showing date, city, country, venue and opening acts
Date (2025)	City	Country	Venue	Opening acts
May 25	Dublin	Ireland	The Main Room at The Academy	Anna Leah
June 5	London	England	O_{2} Academy Islington	—N/a
June 10	Amsterdam	Netherlands	Paradiso Tolhuistuin	—N/a
June 21	Cologne	Germany	Luxor	—N/a
September 21 (Note: The show on September 21, 2025, is part of the Sing Out Loud Festival.)	St. Augustine	United States	Francis Field	—N/a
September 22	North Charleston	United States	Firefly Distillery	Devon Gabriella
September 24	Nashville	United States	Nashville Municipal Auditorium	Devon Gabriella
September 26	Cincinnati	United States	Andrew J. Brady Music Center	Devon Gabriella
September 28	Detroit	United States	Masonic Temple Theatre	Devon Gabriella
September 29	Milwaukee	United States	The Rave/Eagles Club	Devon Gabriella
September 30	St. Paul	United States	Palace Theatre (Note: The venue for the show on September 30, 2025, was upgraded from the Amsterdam Bar & Hall following high demand.)	Devon Gabriella
October 2	Chicago	United States	Radius (Note: The venue for the show on October 2, 2025, was upgraded from Outset following high demand.)	Devon Gabriella
October 3	Columbus	United States	Newport Music Hall (Note: The venue for the show on October 3, 2025, was upgraded from the A&R Music Bar following high demand.)	Devon Gabriella
October 5	Pittsburgh	United States	Petersen Events Center (Note: The venue for the show on October 5, 2025, was upgraded from the Spirit Hall following high demand.)	Devon Gabriella
October 6	Toronto	Canada	Phoenix Concert Theatre (Note: The venue for the show on October 6, 2025, was upgraded from The Axis Club following high demand.)	Devon Gabriella
October 8	Boston	United States	Leader Bank Pavilion (Note: The venue for the show on October 8, 2025, was upgraded from the Brighton Music Hall following high demand.)	Devon Gabriella
October 9	New York	United States	The Rooftop at Pier 17 (Note: The venue for the show on October 9, 2025, was upgraded from the Gramercy Theatre following high demand.)	Devon Gabriella
October 10	New York	United States	The Rooftop at Pier 17	Devon Gabriella
October 12	Philadelphia	United States	The Met (Note: The venue for the show on October 12, 2025, was upgraded from The Foundry following high demand.)	Devon Gabriella
October 13	Washington, DC	United States	The Anthem (Note: The venue for the show on October 13, 2025, was upgraded from The Atlantis following high demand.)	Devon Gabriella
October 15	Atlanta	United States	Tabernacle (Note: The venue for the show on October 15, 2025, was upgraded from The Loft at Center Stage following high demand.)	Devon Gabriella
October 17	Allen	United States	Credit Union of Texas Event Center (Note: The venue for the show on October 17, 2025, was upgraded from the Cambridge Room in Dallas following high demand.)	Devon Gabriella
October 18	Austin	United States	Stubb's Waller Creek Amphitheater (Note: The venue for the show on October 18, 2025, was upgraded from the Empire Control Room following high demand.)	Devon Gabriella
October 20	Denver	United States	Mission Ballroom (Note: The venue for the show on October 20, 2025, was upgraded from the Globe Hall following high demand.)	Devon Gabriella
October 21	Salt Lake City	United States	The Complex (Note: The venue for the show on October 21, 2025, was upgraded from Soundwell following high demand.)	Devon Gabriella
October 24	Seattle	United States	Wamu Theater (Note: The venue for the show on October 24, 2025, was upgraded from Madame Lou's following high demand.)	Devon Gabriella
October 25	Portland	United States	Theater of the Clouds (Note: The venue for the show on October 25, 2025, was upgraded from the Hawthorne Theatre following high demand.)	Devon Gabriella
October 27	San Francisco	United States	Bill Graham Civic Auditorium (Note: The venue for the show on October 27, 2025, was upgraded from Rickshaw Stop following high demand.)	Devon Gabriella
October 28	Los Angeles	United States	Shrine Expo Hall (Note: The venue for the show on October 28, 2025, was upgraded from the El Rey Theatre following high demand.)	Devon Gabriella
October 29	Los Angeles	United States	Shrine Expo Hall	Devon Gabriella
October 31	Phoenix	United States	The Van Buren	Devon Gabriella
November 1	Pomona	United States	Fox Theater	Devon Gabriella
November 2	Los Angeles	United States	The Fonda	Devon Gabriella
November 5	Brooklyn	United States	Brooklyn Steel	Blu DeTiger
November 6	Brooklyn	United States	Brooklyn Steel	Blu DeTiger
December 2	Auckland	New Zealand	Auckland Town Hall	—N/a
December 4	Melbourne	Australia	Festival Hall	—N/a
December 6 (Note: The shows on December 6, 7, 13 & 14, 2025 are part of the Spilt Milk Festival.)	Newington	Australia	Victoria Park	—N/a
December 7	Claremont	Australia	Robinson Pavilion	—N/a
December 9	Moore Park	Australia	Hordern Pavilion	—N/a
December 11	Brisbane	Australia	Fortitude Music Hall	—N/a
December 13	Canberra	Australia	Exhibition Park	—N/a
December 14	Carrara	Australia	Gold Coast Sports & Leisure Centre	—N/a
December 16	Moore Park	Australia	Hordern Pavilion	—N/a

List of 2026 concerts, showing date, city, country, venue and opening acts
Date (2026)	City	Country	Venue	Opening acts
February 10	Stockholm	Sweden	Annexet	—N/a
February 11	Copenhagen	Denmark	KB Hallen	—N/a
February 13	Hamburg	Germany	Inselpark Arena	—N/a
February 15	Warsaw	Poland	Stodoła	—N/a
February 16	Prague	Czech Republic	Forum Karlín	—N/a
February 18	Vienna	Austria	Gasometer	—N/a
February 19	Munich	Germany	Tonhalle	—N/a
February 20	Dübendorf	Switzerland	The Hall	—N/a
February 22	Milan	Italy	Alcatraz Milano	—N/a
February 24	Madrid	Spain	Palacio Vistalegre	—N/a
February 25	Barcelona	Spain	Sant Jordi Club	—N/a
February 27	Paris	France	Salle Pleyel	—N/a
March 1	Paris	France	Salle Pleyel	—N/a
March 2	Amsterdam	Netherlands	AFAS Live	—N/a
March 4	Berlin	Germany	Velodrom	—N/a
March 5	Cologne	Germany	Palladium	—N/a
March 6	Brussels	Belgium	Ancienne Belgique	—N/a
March 8	Brixton	England	O_{2} Academy Brixton	—N/a
March 9	Brixton	England	O_{2} Academy Brixton	—N/a
March 10	Brixton	England	O_{2} Academy Brixton	—N/a
March 12	Manchester	England	Aviva Studios	—N/a
March 13	Birmingham	England	O_{2} Academy2 Birmingham	—N/a
March 15	Glasgow	Scotland	O_{2} Academy Glasgow	—N/a
March 16	Dublin	Ireland	3Arena	—N/a
