= Charlotte D'Alessio =

Canadian model (born 1998)

- Born: Briar Christina D'Alessio; 5 May 1998 (age 28); Toronto, Ontario, Canada
- Modelling information
- Height: 1.70 m (5 ft 7 in)
- Hair colour: Brown
- Eye colour: Green
- Agency: Marilyn Agency (New York); Elite Model Management (Los Angeles); Storm Management (London)

Charlotte Briar Christina D’Alessio (born Briar Christina D’Alessio; May 5, 1998) is a Canadian model and social media influencer. She was discovered at Coachella.

== Early life and career ==
D'Alessio was born in an affluent area of Toronto, Ontario, Canada, to Christina Ford, a commercial producer, and Richard D'Alessio. She was originally named Briar D'Alessio. She has a sister named Samantha D'Alessio.

D'Alessio attended The Mabin School, Bishop Strachan School, and North Toronto Collegiate Institute in Toronto before moving to Los Angeles, California with her father (her mother lived in London), where she attended Beverly Hills High School.

She was discovered by photographer Bryant Eslava with model Josie Canseco. His photos of them went viral and were shared by celebrities such as The Weeknd, and the official Coachella account.

She and her mother had become estranged after D'Alessio's success and she decided to leave school to pursue modelling.

In 2020, she appeared in a campaign for Marc Jacobs' Daisy perfume line.

In October 2020, D'Alessio appeared in a campaign for David Dobrik's perfume/cologne brand, David's Perfume.

In April 2025, she was featured in sombr's "Back to Friends" music video.
