= Brit Awards 2026 =

British music awards ceremony

- Date: 28 February 2026
- Location: Co-op Live
- Hosted by: Jack Whitehall

Highlights
- Most awards: Olivia Dean (4)
- Most nominations: Olivia Dean; Lola Young (5)
- Website: brits.co.uk

Television/radio coverage
- Network: ITV and ITVX (United Kingdom); YouTube (outside United Kingdom)

The Brit Awards 2026 was the 46th edition of the Brit Awards ceremony presented by British Phonographic Industry (BPI) to recognise the best in British and international music in 2025. It was held on 28 February 2026 at the Co-op Live arena in Manchester, the first time in the ceremony's history that it was held outside London. Jack Whitehall hosted the ceremony for the sixth time, while Charley Marlowe and Tyler West hosted the live red carpet coverage across the BRITs' official social media channels for the first time.

For this year's ceremony, Olivia Dean and Lola Young led the nominations, with five each, both being nominated for British Artist of the Year, Song of the Year, and Best Pop Act. Sam Fender followed them, with four nominations. Dean won four awards, for Pop Act, British Artist, Album, and - with Fender - Song of the Year. Fender was the only other artist to garner multiple awards during the ceremony.

== Background ==
First presented in 1977, the Brit Awards is an annual event recognising the best in British and International music, which had been held at venues in London since its launch, with The O2 Arena hosting the ceremony from 2011. On 9 June, the BPI announced a two-year deal to hold the 2026 and 2027 Brit Awards at Manchester's Co-op Live arena, marking the first time the Brit Awards were held outside of London. On the same day, a three-year sponsorship deal was announced with Sony Music UK. Andy Burnham, the Mayor of Greater Manchester, described the move as a "massive coup for Greater Manchester".

The news followed an announcement in May that the 2025 Mercury Prize would be held in Newcastle instead of London.

In October, as part of the first details for the 2026 ceremony, the Rising Star award was reverted to its original name, the Critics' Choice Award, "in acknowledgement of the importance of 'critical acclaim' to artists at this early and crucial stage of their career". The award for Best New Artist was also reverted to British Breakthrough Act after previously being renamed in 2019, "celebrating the transformative point for British artists as they cut through to a wider audience and in support of the long-term development of artists and their progression".

=== Trophy ===
The designer for this year's trophy was fashion stylist Matthew Williamson. The sculpture was inspired by Williamson's upbringing in Manchester, and was made using amber-toned resin made to resemble the golden honey of a worker bee, the city's mascot.

=== Brits Week 2026 ===
To promote the awards ceremony and support the charity War Child, the BPI hosted several gigs as part of Brits Week. Artists performing as part of Brits Week included:

- Fatboy Slim at Boiler Shop, Newcastle upon Tyne (12 February)
- Lambrini Girls at The Garage, London (16 February)
- Myles Smith at Rescue Rooms, Nottingham (24 February)
- Jack Savoretti and Katherine Jenkins at Emerald Theatre, London (25 February)
- kwn at Patterns, Brighton (25 February)
- Josh Baker at Yes, Manchester (25 February)
- Rossi. at Yes, Manchester (26 February)
- Jacob Alon at Music Room at Assembly Rooms, Edinburgh (27 February)
- Robbie Williams at Factory International, Aviva Studios, Manchester (27 February)

== Performances ==
On 21 January 2026, on the Bring on the BRITs with Mastercard: The 2026 Nominations Show live on Instagram, the first performer was announced as Olivia Dean. On 28 January, Harry Styles was announced as the second artist to be performing at the ceremony. Wolf Alice were added to the line-up on the next day. Mark Ronson was confirmed as a performer on 3 February alongside the announcement that he would be receiving the Outstanding Contribution to Music award. Rosalía was announced as the fifth performer of the ceremony on 5 February. On 13 February, Ejae, Audrey Nuna and Rei Ami were announced as the next performers, becoming the first K-pop performers in the history of the Brit Awards. Their performance was recorded in advance and was broadcast during the ceremony. On 16 February, Alex Warren was announced as the seventh performer for the ceremony. Sombr was announced as the eighth performer on 19 February. On 26 February, Raye was announced as the ninth performer, and Robbie Williams would pay tribute to Ozzy Osbourne alongside his former bandmates Adam Wakeman, Robert Trujillo, Tommy Clufetos and Zakk Wylde.

List of performances
Artist(s)	Song(s)	UK Singles Chart reaction (week ending 6 March 2026)	UK Albums Chart reaction (week ending 6 March 2026)
Harry Styles	"Aperture"	10 (+6)	Harry's House - 72 (+26); Fine Line - 80 (+6)
Huntrix: Ejae, Audrey Nuna and Rei Ami	"Golden"	20 (-4)	—N/a
Olivia Dean	"Man I Need"	8 (-1)	The Art of Loving - 2 (+/-); Messy - 50 (+24)
Raye	"Where Is My Husband!" "Nightingale Lane"	13 (+/-); 20 (NEW)	My 21st Century Blues - 52 (+9)
Rosalía Björk The Heritage Orchestra	"Berghain"	—N/a	Lux - 37 (re-entry)
Alex Warren James Blunt	"Ordinary"	16 (+3)	You'll Be Alright, Kid - 7 (+4)
Mark Ronson Ghostface Killah The Dap-Kings Dua Lipa	"Ooh Wee" "Back to Black" "Valerie" "Uptown Funk" "Dance the Night" "Electricity"	—N/a	—N/a
Wolf Alice	"The Sofa"	—N/a	—N/a
Sombr	"Undressed" "Back to Friends"	N/A; 42 (+7)	I Barely Know Her - 17 (+10)
Robbie Williams Adam Wakeman Robert Trujillo Tommy Clufetos Zakk Wylde	Tribute to Ozzy Osbourne "No More Tears"	—N/a	—N/a

== Winners and nominees ==
The Critics' Choice shortlist was revealed on 3 December 2025, with Jacob Alon announced as the winner on 19 January 2026. The complete list of nominees was announced on 21 January 2026. Mark Ronson was announced as the recipient of the Outstanding Contribution to Music award on 3 February 2026. Noel Gallagher was confirmed to receive the Songwriter of the Year award on 4 February while PinkPantheress was announced as the recipient of Producer of the Year on 23 February. On 26 February, it was announced that Ozzy Osbourne would posthumously receive the Lifetime Achievement Award. Winners appear first and are highlighted in bold.

British Album of the Year (presented by Jeff Goldblum)	Song of the Year (presented by Robbie Williams)
**The Art of Loving – Olivia Dean**; The Boy Who Played the Harp – Dave; West End Girl – Lily Allen; People Watching – Sam Fender; The Clearing – Wolf Alice	**"Rein Me In" – Sam Fender and Olivia Dean**; "Blessings" – Calvin Harris and Clementine Douglas; "The Days (Notion Remix)" – Chrystal and Notion; "Defying Gravity" – Cynthia Erivo and Ariana Grande; "Azizam" – Ed Sheeran; "Victory Lap" – Fred Again, Skepta, and PlaqueBoyMax; "Survive" – Lewis Capaldi; "Messy" – Lola Young; "Nice to Meet You" – Myles Smith; "Man I Need" – Olivia Dean; "Where Is My Husband!" – Raye; "Family Matters" – Skye Newman
British Artist of the Year (presented by Maya Jama and James Blunt)	British Group (presented by Shaun Ryder and Bez)
**Olivia Dean**; Dave; Fred Again; Jade; Lily Allen; Little Simz; Lola Young; PinkPantheress; Sam Fender; Self Esteem	**Wolf Alice**; The Last Dinner Party; Pulp; Sleep Token; Wet Leg
Best Pop Act (presented by Matthew Williamson)	Best R&B Act (presented by Clara Amfo)
**Olivia Dean**; Jade; Lily Allen; Lola Young; Raye	**Sault**; Jim Legxacy; Kwn; Mabel; Sasha Keable
Best Dance Act (presented by DJ Paulette)	Best Alternative/Rock Act (presented by Jack Saunders)
**Fred Again, Skepta, and PlaqueBoyMax**; Calvin Harris and Clementine Douglas; FKA Twigs; PinkPantheress; Sammy Virji	**Sam Fender**; Blood Orange; Lola Young; Wet Leg; Wolf Alice
Best Hip Hop/Grime/Rap Act (presented by Sasha Keable)	British Breakthrough Artist (presented by Myles Smith)
**Dave**; Central Cee; Jim Legxacy; Little Simz; Loyle Carner	**Lola Young**; Barry Can't Swim; EsDeeKid; Jim Legxacy; Skye Newman
International Artist of the Year (presented by Tems and Jade Thirlwall)	International Song of the Year (presented by Luke Littler and Angryginge)
**Rosalía**; Bad Bunny; Chappell Roan; CMAT; Doechii; Lady Gaga; Sabrina Carpenter; Sombr; Taylor Swift; Tyler, the Creator	**"APT." – Rosé and Bruno Mars**; "Ordinary" – Alex Warren; "Pink Pony Club" – Chappell Roan; "No Broke Boys" – Disco Lines and Tinashe; "Sailor Song" – Gigi Perez; "That's So True" – Gracie Abrams; "Golden" – Huntrix: Ejae, Audrey Nuna and Rei Ami; "Die with a Smile" – Lady Gaga and Bruno Mars; "Love Me Not" – Ravyn Lenae; "Manchild" – Sabrina Carpenter; "Undressed" – Sombr; "The Fate of Ophelia" – Taylor Swift
International Group of the Year (presented by Cat Burns)	Critics' Choice
**Geese**; Haim; Tame Impala; Huntrix: Ejae, Audrey Nuna and Rei Ami; Turnstile	**Jacob Alon**; Rose Gray; Sienna Spiro
Songwriter of the Year (presented by Bobby Gillespie)
**Noel Gallagher**
Producer of the Year
**PinkPantheress**
Outstanding Contribution to Music (presented by Skepta)
**Mark Ronson**
Lifetime Achievement Award (presented by Dolly Parton)
**Ozzy Osbourne** (**Posthumously**)

== Multiple nominations and awards ==
Artists who received multiple nominations
Nominations	Artist
5	Olivia Dean
5	Lola Young
4	Sam Fender
3	Lily Allen
3	Wolf Alice
3	Dave
3	Fred Again
3	Jim Legxacy
2	JADE
2	Calvin Harris and Clementine Douglas
2	PinkPantheress
2	Sabrina Carpenter
2	Chappell Roan
2	Little Simz
2	Raye
2	Skepta
2	PlaqueBoyMax
2	Wet Leg
2	Skye Newman
2	Bruno Mars
2	Huntrix
2	Sombr
2	Lady Gaga
2	Taylor Swift

Artists who received multiple awards
Awards	Artist
4	Olivia Dean
2	Sam Fender
