= 2025 MTV Video Music Awards =

42nd edition of the MTV Video Music Awards held in 2025

- Date: Sunday, September 7, 2025; 8:00—11:03 p.m. EDT
- Venue: UBS Arena, Elmont, New York
- Country: United States
- Hosted by: LL Cool J

Highlights
- Most awards: Lady Gaga (4)
- Most nominations: Lady Gaga (12)
- Website: mtv.com/vma

Television/radio coverage
- Network: CBS; Paramount+; MTV; Global
- Viewership: 5.5 million
- Produced by: Bruce Gillmer; Jesse Ignjatovic; Barb Bialkowski; Van Toffler
- Directed by: Joe DeMaio

The 2025 MTV Video Music Awards were held at the UBS Arena in Elmont, New York, on September 7, 2025. It was broadcast for the first time on CBS and available to stream on the premium tier of Paramount+ with a simulcast on MTV. The show was hosted by rapper and actor LL Cool J. The pre-show was aired on MTV and select sister cable networks with hosts Nessa and Kevan Kenney.

The ceremony recognized outstanding music videos and songs released between June 20, 2024, and June 18, 2025. Best Country—carried over from the CMT Music Awards' Video of the Year category—and the newly introduced Best Pop Artist were both determined by fan voting. Lady Gaga led all nominees with twelve nominations and won four awards, making her the night's most awarded artist. Ariana Grande's Brighter Days Ahead won Video of the Year, while Rosé and Bruno Mars’ "APT." received Song of the Year honors. Mariah Carey was presented with the Michael Jackson Video Vanguard Award by Grande. Two additional special honors were introduced: Busta Rhymes received the Rock the Bells Visionary Award, and Ricky Martin was named Latin Icon. The broadcast achieved a 42% increase in viewership over the previous year, marking its highest ratings in six years.

== Performances ==
=== Pre-show ===
Katseye was announced as a performer for the pre-show on September 2, 2025.

Artist(s)	Song(s)
Katseye	"Gnarly" "Gabriela"

=== Main show ===
The first round of performers were announced on August 18, 2025. Mariah Carey was announced on August 21. The second round was announced on August 26. Lady Gaga was announced on August 30. On September 5, performers for the Ozzy Osbourne tribute were announced.

Artist(s)	Song(s)
Doja Cat Kenny G	"Jealous Type"
Ricky Martin	Latin Icon Medley "Livin' la Vida Loca" "Pégate" "Shake Your Bon-Bon" "Vente Pa' Ca" "María" "The Cup of Life"
Tate McRae	"Revolving Door" "Sports Car"
Busta Rhymes Spliff Star Joyner Lucas Papoose GloRilla	Rock The Bells Visionary Medley "Break Ya Neck" "Gimme Some More" "Scenario" "Touch It" (Remix) "Put Your Hands Where My Eyes Could See" "Pass the Courvoisier, Part II"
Sabrina Carpenter	"Tears"
Post Malone Jelly Roll	"Losers" (Pre-Taped from Heinz-von-Heiden-Arena)
Mariah Carey	Michael Jackson Video Vanguard Medley "Sugar Sweet" "Fantasy" (O.D.B Remix) "Honey" "Heartbreaker" "Obsessed" "It's Like That" (with elements of "Type Dangerous") "We Belong Together"
Lady Gaga	"Abracadabra" "The Dead Dance" (Pre-Taped from Madison Square Garden)
Alex Warren	"Eternity" "Ordinary"
Steven Tyler Joe Perry Yungblud Nuno Bettencourt	Tribute to Ozzy Osbourne "Crazy Train" "Changes" "Mama, I'm Coming Home"
J Balvin DJ Snake Justin Quiles Lenny Tavárez	"Zun Zun" "Noventa"
Sombr	"Back to Friends" "12 to 12"
Conan Gray	"Vodka Cranberry"

=== Extended Play stage ===
Extended Play stage performers were announced on September 2, 2025.

Artist(s)	Song(s)
Lola Young	"Messy"
Bailey Zimmerman The Kid Laroi	"Lost"
Megan Moroney	"6 Months Later"

== Presenters ==
Presenters were announced on September 2, 2025.

=== Pre-show ===
- Nessa – presented Best New Artist and Song of Summer
- Kevan Kenney – presented Best R&B and Best Alternative

=== Main show ===
- Lenny Kravitz – presented Artist of the Year
- Livvy Dunne – introduced Lola Young and the Extended Play Stage
- J Balvin – introduced Ricky Martin
- Jessica Simpson – presented the Latin Icon Award
- Nikki Glaser – introduced Tate McRae
- Paris Hilton – presented Song of the Year
- LL Cool J – introduced Busta Rhymes and presented the Rock the Bells Visionary Award
- Ice Spice and Latto – presented Push Performance of the Year
- Luke Grimes – introduced Post Malone and Jelly Roll
- Jon Jones – introduced Bailey Zimmerman and The Kid Laroi
- Ariana Grande – introduced Mariah Carey and presented the Michael Jackson Video Vanguard Award
- Rosé – introduced Lady Gaga
- Brittany Snow and Malin Akerman – introduced Alex Warren
- Jack Osbourne – introduced the Ozzy Osbourne tribute
- GloRilla – introduced J Balvin, Justin Quiles, Lenny Tavárez and DJ Snake
- Ejae, Audrey Nuna and Rei Ami – presented Best Album
- Alix Earle – introduced Megan Moroney
- Megan Stalter – introduced Sombr
- Ciara – presented Best Pop
- Ashlee Simpson Ross and Jessica Simpson – presented Best Collaboration
- Katseye – introduced Conan Gray
- LL Cool J – presented Video of the Year

== Winners and nominees ==
The nominees were announced on August 5, 2025, with two new award categories–Best Country and Best Pop Artist. The nominees in the social categories–Best Group and Song of Summer–were announced on August 29. Lady Gaga led with twelve nominations. She is followed by Bruno Mars with eleven, Kendrick Lamar with ten, Sabrina Carpenter with nine, Rosé with eight, Ariana Grande with seven, Billie Eilish, Tate McRae and The Weeknd with six each, Charli XCX with five, and Alex Warren, Bad Bunny, Doechii, Ed Sheeran, Jelly Roll, Miley Cyrus and Morgan Wallen with four each. Gaga was the night's biggest winner, receiving four awards, followed by Grande and Carpenter with three award each, while Mars, McRae, Doechii and Mariah Carey received two each.

Winners are listed first and highlighted in bold.

=== Voted categories ===
The winners of the following categories are chosen by fan votes. The first round of voting, known as the "General Voting Period", began on August 5 at 12:00 p.m. ET for the categories which nominees were announced on the same day, and concluded on September 5 at 6 p.m. ET. Voting for Best New Artist continues until the end of the ceremony.

**Video of the Year** **(Presented by Burger King)**: **Ariana Grande – Brighter Days Ahead**; Billie Eilish – "Birds of a Feather"; Kendrick Lamar – "Not Like Us"; Lady Gaga and Bruno Mars – "Die with a Smile"; Rosé and Bruno Mars – "Apt."; Sabrina Carpenter – "Manchild"; The Weeknd and Playboi Carti – "Timeless"	**Artist of the Year**: **Lady Gaga**; Bad Bunny; Beyoncé; Kendrick Lamar; Taylor Swift; Morgan Wallen; The Weeknd
**Song of the Year**: **Rosé and Bruno Mars – "APT."**; Alex Warren – "Ordinary"; Billie Eilish – "Birds of a Feather"; Gracie Abrams – "I Love You, I'm Sorry"; Lady Gaga and Bruno Mars – "Die with a Smile"; Tate McRae – "Sports Car"	**Best New Artist**: **Alex Warren**; Ella Langley; Gigi Perez; Lola Young; Sombr; The Marías
**Best Pop Artist**: **Sabrina Carpenter**; Ariana Grande; Charli XCX; Justin Bieber; Lorde; Miley Cyrus; Tate McRae	**Push Performance of the Year** **(Presented by Bacardi)**: **January 2025: Katseye – "Touch"**; August 2024: Shaboozey – "A Bar Song (Tipsy)"; September 2024: Ayra Starr – "Last Heartbreak Song"; October 2024: Mark Ambor – "Belong Together"; November 2024: Lay Bankz – "Graveyard"; December 2024: Dasha – "Bye Bye Bye"; February 2025: Jordan Adetunji – "Kehlani"; March 2025: Leon Thomas – "Yes It Is"; April 2025: Livingston – "Shadow"; May 2025: Damiano David – "Next Summer"; June 2025: Gigi Perez – "Sailor Song"; July 2025: Role Model – "Sally, When the Wine Runs Out"
**Best Pop**: **Ariana Grande – Brighter Days Ahead**; Alex Warren – "Ordinary"; Ed Sheeran – "Sapphire"; Lady Gaga and Bruno Mars – "Die with a Smile"; Rosé and Bruno Mars – "Apt."; Sabrina Carpenter – "Manchild"
**Best Album**: **Sabrina Carpenter – Short n' Sweet**; Bad Bunny – Debí Tirar Más Fotos; Kendrick Lamar – GNX; Lady Gaga – Mayhem; Morgan Wallen – I'm the Problem; The Weeknd – Hurry Up Tomorrow	**Best Collaboration** **(Presented by Under Armour)**: **Lady Gaga and Bruno Mars – "Die with a Smile"**; Bailey Zimmerman and Luke Combs – "Backup Plan"; Kendrick Lamar and SZA – "Luther"; Post Malone featuring Blake Shelton – "Pour Me a Drink"; Rosé and Bruno Mars – "Apt."; Selena Gomez and Benny Blanco – "Sunset Blvd"
**Best Hip-Hop**: **Doechii – "Anxiety"**; Drake – "Nokia"; Eminem featuring Jelly Roll – "Somebody Save Me"; GloRilla featuring Sexyy Red – "Whatchu Kno About Me"; Kendrick Lamar – "Not Like Us"; LL Cool J featuring Eminem – "Murdergram Deux"; Travis Scott – "4x4"	**Best R&B**: **Mariah Carey – "Type Dangerous"**; Chris Brown – "Residuals"; Leon Thomas and Freddie Gibbs – "Mutt (Remix)"; PartyNextDoor – "No Chill"; SZA – "Drive"; Summer Walker – "Heart of a Woman"; The Weeknd and Playboi Carti – "Timeless"
**Best Alternative**: **Sombr – "Back to Friends"**; Gigi Perez – "Sailor Song"; Imagine Dragons – "Wake Up"; Lola Young – "Messy"; MGK and Jelly Roll – "Lonely Road"; The Marías – "Back to Me"	**Best Rock**: **Coldplay – "All My Love"**; Evanescence – "Afterlife" (From the Netflix Series Devil May Cry)"; Green Day – "One Eyed Bastard"; Lenny Kravitz – "Honey"; Linkin Park – "The Emptiness Machine"; Twenty One Pilots – "The Contract"
**Best Latin**: **Shakira – "Soltera"**; Bad Bunny – "Baile Inolvidable"; J Balvin – "Rio"; Karol G – "Si Antes Te Hubiera Conocido"; Peso Pluma and Netón Vega – "La Patrulla"; Rauw Alejandro and Romeo Santos – "Khé?"	**Best K-Pop**: **Lisa featuring Doja Cat and Raye – "Born Again"**; Aespa – "Whiplash"; Jennie – "Like Jennie"; Jimin – "Who"; Jisoo – "Earthquake"; Rosé – "Toxic Till the End"; Stray Kids – "Chk Chk Boom"
**Best Afrobeats**: **Tyla – "Push 2 Start"**; Asake and Travis Scott – "Active"; Burna Boy and Travis Scott – "TaTaTa"; Moliy, Silent Addy, Skillibeng, and Shenseea – "Shake It to the Max (Fly) (remix)"; Rema – "Baby (Is It a Crime)"; Tems and Asake – "Get It Right"; Wizkid and Brent Faiyaz – "Piece of My Heart"	**Best Country**: **Megan Moroney – "Am I Okay?"**; Chris Stapleton – "Think I'm in Love with You"; Cody Johnson and Carrie Underwood – "I'm Gonna Love You"; Jelly Roll – "Liar"; Morgan Wallen – "Smile"; Lainey Wilson – "4x4xU"
**Video for Good**: **Charli XCX featuring Billie Eilish – "Guess"**; Burna Boy – "Higher"; Doechii – "Anxiety"; Eminem featuring Jelly Roll – "Somebody Save Me"; Selena Gomez and Benny Blanco – "Younger and Hotter Than Me"; Zach Hood featuring Sasha Alex Sloan – "Sleepwalking"	**Best Long Form Video**: **Ariana Grande – Brighter Days Ahead**; Bad Bunny – Debí Tirar Más Fotos (Short Film); Damiano David – Funny Little Stories; Mac Miller – Balloonerism; Miley Cyrus – Something Beautiful; The Weeknd – Hurry Up Tomorrow
**Best Group**: **Blackpink**; Aespa; All Time Low; Backstreet Boys; Coldplay; Evanescence; Fuerza Regida; Grupo Frontera; Imagine Dragons; Jonas Brothers; Katseye; My Chemical Romance; Seventeen; Stray Kids; The Marías; Twenty One Pilots	**Song of Summer**: **Tate McRae – "Just Keep Watching"**; Addison Rae – "Headphones On"; Alex Warren – "Ordinary"; Benson Boone – "Mystical Magical"; BigXthaPlug featuring Bailey Zimmerman – "All the Way"; Chappell Roan – "The Subway"; Demi Lovato – "Fast"; Doja Cat – "Jealous Type"; Huntrix: Ejae, Audrey Nuna and Rei Ami – "Golden"; Jessie Murph – "Blue Strips"; Justin Bieber – "Daisies"; Moliy, Silent Addy, Skillibeng and Shenseea – "Shake It to the Max (Fly) (remix)"; Morgan Wallen featuring Tate McRae – "What I Want"; Ravyn Lenae featuring Rex Orange County – "Love Me Not"; Sabrina Carpenter – "Manchild"; Sombr – "12 to 12"

=== Professional categories ===
The winners of the following categories were chosen by industry professionals.

**Best Direction**: **Lady Gaga – "Abracadabra" (Directors: Lady Gaga, Bethany Vargas and Parris Goebel)**; Ariana Grande – Brighter Days Ahead (Director: Christian Breslauer); Charli XCX featuring Billie Eilish – "Guess" (Director: Aidan Zamiri); Kendrick Lamar – "Not Like Us" (Directors: Dave Free and Kendrick Lamar); Rosé and Bruno Mars – "Apt." (Directors: Bruno Mars and Daniel Ramos); Sabrina Carpenter – "Manchild" (Directors: Vania Heymann and Gal Muggia)	**Best Art Direction**: **Lady Gaga – "Abracadabra" (Art Director: Wesley Goodrich)**; Charli XCX featuring Billie Eilish – "Guess" (Art Director: Daniel Lane); Kendrick Lamar – "Not Like Us" (Art Director: Freyja Bardell); Lorde – "Man of the Year" (Art Directors: Chad Keith and Jenny Lass); Miley Cyrus – "End of the World" (Art Director: David Meyer); Rosé and Bruno Mars – "Apt." (Art Director: Elizabet Puksto)
**Best Cinematography**: **Kendrick Lamar – "Not Like Us" (Director of Photography: Xiaolong Liu)**; Ariana Grande – Brighter Days Ahead (Director of Photography: Jeff Cronenweth); Ed Sheeran – "Sapphire" (Director of Photography: Nic Minns); Lady Gaga – "Abracadabra" (Director of Photography: Xiaolong Liu); Miley Cyrus – "Easy Lover" (Director of Photography: Benoît Debie); Sabrina Carpenter – "Manchild" (Director of Photography: Chris Ripley)	**Best Editing**: **Tate McRae – "Just Keep Watching" (Editors: William Town and Modern Post)**; Charli XCX featuring Billie Eilish – "Guess" (Editor: Neal Farmer); Ed Sheeran – "Sapphire" (Editor: Liam Pethick); Kendrick Lamar – "Not Like Us" (Editors: Chaz Smedley and Eddy Street Post); Lady Gaga – "Abracadabra" (Editor: Sofia Kerpan); Sabrina Carpenter – "Manchild" (Editors: Vania Heymann, Gal Muggia and Nick Rondeau)
**Best Choreography**: **Doechii – "Anxiety" (Choreographer: Robbie Blue)**; FKA Twigs – "Eusexua" (Choreographer: Zoi Tatopoulos); Kendrick Lamar – "Not Like Us" (Choreographer: Charm La'Donna); Lady Gaga – "Abracadabra" (Choreographer: Parris Goebel); Tyla – "Push 2 Start" (Choreographer: Lee-ché Janecke); Zara Larsson – "Pretty Ugly" (Choreographer: Zoi Tatopoulos)	**Best Visual Effects**: **Sabrina Carpenter – "Manchild" (Visual Effects: Vania Heymann and Tal Baltuch)**; Ariana Grande – Brighter Days Ahead (Visual Effects: Mathematic); Lady Gaga – "Abracadabra" (Visual Effects: Yeap Crew, Yura Karikh and Igor Eyth); Rosé and Bruno Mars – "Apt." (Visual Effects: Maksymilian Rafal Ojster); Tate McRae – "Just Keep Watching" (Visual Effects: Daniel Saldivar and White Rhino VFX); The Weeknd – Hurry Up Tomorrow (Visual Effects: Zeke Faust)

== Special awards ==
The recipients of the Rock the Bells Visionary and Latin Icon awards were announced on August 18, 2025. The recipient of the Video Vanguard was announced on August 21.

- Michael Jackson Video Vanguard Award: Mariah Carey
- Rock the Bells Visionary Award: Busta Rhymes
- Latin Icon Award: Ricky Martin

== Artists with multiple wins and nominations ==
Artists who received multiple awards
Wins	Artist
4	Lady Gaga
3	Ariana Grande
3	Sabrina Carpenter
2	Bruno Mars
2	Doechii
2	Mariah Carey
2	Tate McRae

Artists who received multiple nominations
Nominations	Artist
12	Lady Gaga
11	Bruno Mars
10	Kendrick Lamar
9	Sabrina Carpenter
8	Rosé
7	Ariana Grande
6	Billie Eilish
6	Tate McRae
6	The Weeknd
5	Charli XCX
4	Alex Warren
4	Bad Bunny
4	Doechii
4	Ed Sheeran
4	Jelly Roll
4	Miley Cyrus
4	Morgan Wallen
3	Eminem
3	Gigi Perez
3	Lorde
3	Playboi Carti
3	Sombr
3	The Marías
3	Travis Scott
2	Aespa
2	Asake
2	Bailey Zimmerman
2	Benny Blanco
2	Burna Boy
2	Coldplay
2	Damiano David
2	Doja Cat
2	Evanescence
2	Imagine Dragons
2	Justin Bieber
2	Katseye
2	Leon Thomas
2	Lola Young
2	Moliy
2	Selena Gomez
2	Shenseea
2	Silent Addy
2	Skillibeng
2	Stray Kids
2	SZA
2	Twenty One Pilots
2	Tyla

== Music Videos with multiple wins and nominations ==
Music Videos that received multiple awards
Wins	Artist	Music Video
3	Ariana Grande	Brighter Days Ahead
2	Doechii	"Anxiety"
2	Lady Gaga	"Abracadabra"
2	Tate McRae	"Just Keep Watching"

Music Videos that received multiple nominations
Nominations	Artist(s)	Music Video
7	Kendrick Lamar	"Not Like Us"
7	Rosé & Bruno Mars	"Apt."
7	Sabrina Carpenter	"Manchild"
6	Ariana Grande	Brighter Days Ahead
6	Lady Gaga	"Abracadabra"
4	Charli XCX (featuring Billie Eilish)	"Guess"
4	Doechii	"Anxiety"
4	Ed Sheeran	"Sapphire"
4	Lady Gaga & Bruno Mars	"Die with a Smile"
3	Alex Warren	"Ordinary"
3	Tate McRae	"Just Keep Watching"
3	The Weeknd & Playboi Carti	"Timeless"
2	Billie Eilish	"Birds of a Feather"
2	Eminem (featuring Jelly Roll)	"Somebody Save Me"
2	Gigi Perez	"Sailor Song"
2	Moliy, Silent Addy, Skillibeng & Shenseea	"Shake It to the Max (Fly) (remix)"
2	The Weeknd	Hurry Up Tomorrow
2	Tyla	"Push 2 Start"
