= Brit Award for Songwriter of the Year =

British music award

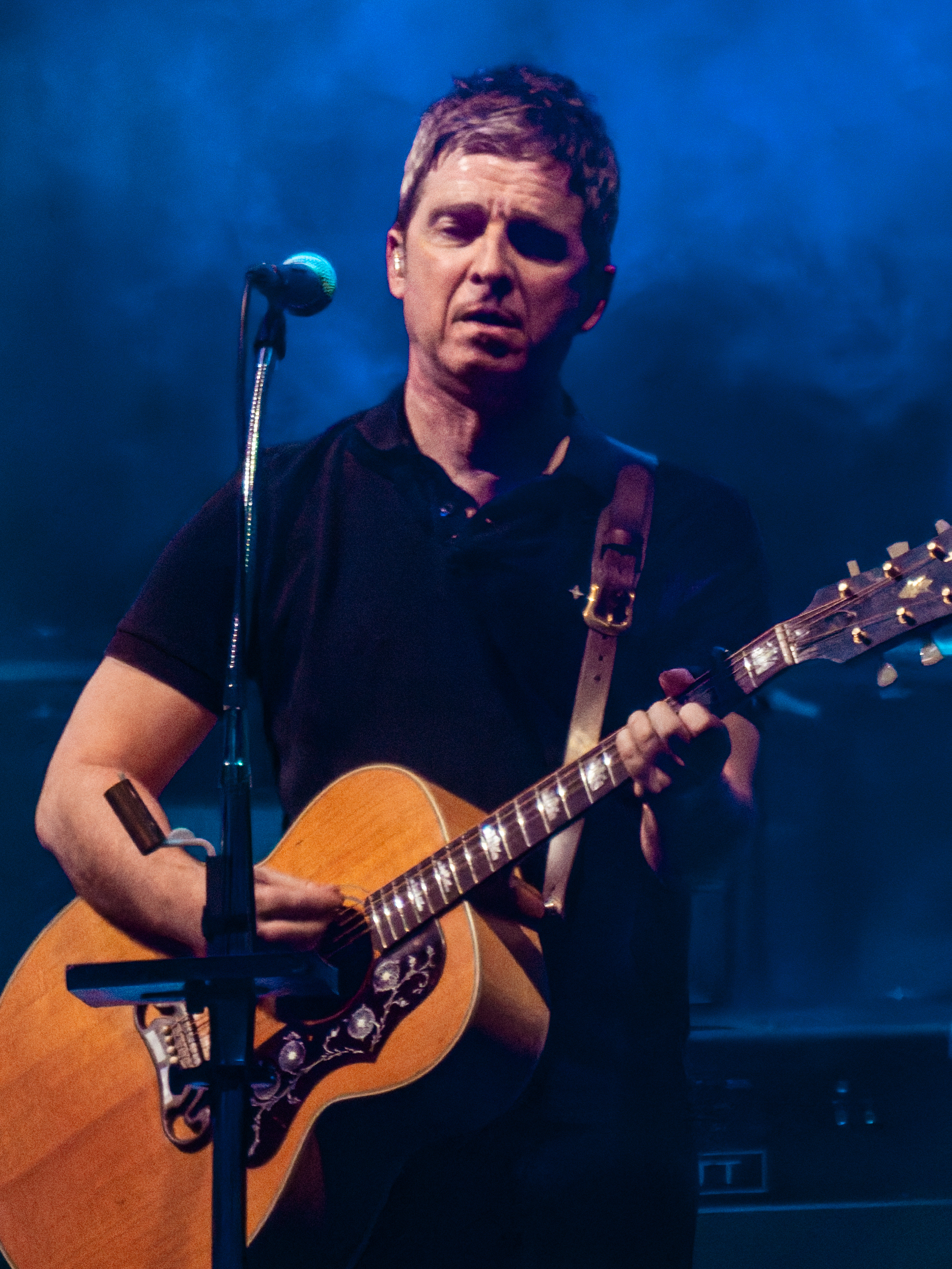
- 2026 winner Noel Gallagher
- Awarded for: Achievement in excellence in songwriting
- Country: United Kingdom (UK)
- Presented by: British Phonographic Industry (BPI)
- First award: 2022
- Currently held by: Noel Gallagher (2026)
- Website: www.brits.co.uk

The Brit Award for Songwriter of the Year is an award given by the British Phonographic Industry (BPI), an organisation which represents record companies and artists in the United Kingdom. The accolade is presented at the Brit Awards, an annual celebration of British and international music. The award was first presented in 2022. The winner is selected by a panel of judges and no nominees are announced.

The inaugural recipient of the award was Ed Sheeran.

== Recipients ==
Year	Recipient
2022	Ed Sheeran
2023	Kid Harpoon
2024	Raye
2025	Charli XCX
2026	Noel Gallagher
