= We Never Dated =

Single by Sombr

from the album I Barely Know Her
- Released: June 20, 2025
- Length: 3:17
- Label: SMB; Warner
- Songwriter: Shane Boose
- Producer: Sombr

Sombr singles chronology
"Undressed" (2025)	"We Never Dated" (2025)	"12 to 12" (2025)

"We Never Dated" is a song by American singer-songwriter Sombr, solely written and produced by him. Released on June 20, 2025, through Warner Records and Sombr's own imprint SMB, it serves as the third single from his debut studio album, I Barely Know Her.

The song achieved moderate commercial success, reaching the top 40 of the song charts in Ireland, Lithuania, and the United Kingdom.

== Composition ==
"We Never Dated" is composed in the key of F-sharp major with a time signature of 4/4, and has a tempo of 104 beats per minute.

== Commercial performance ==
"We Never Dated" debuted on the Billboard Global 200 at number 140 for the week ending July 5, 2025, marking Sombr's third entry on the chart, following "Back to Friends" and "Undressed". In the same week, the song debuted at number four on the Bubbling Under Hot 100 and number 83 on the Canadian Hot 100. It additionally appeared on the Hot Rock & Alternative Songs chart, debuting and peaking at number 13.

The song debuted on the Irish and the UK singles charts dated June 27, 2025, at numbers 35 and 37, respectively. In Australia, it debuted at number 65 on the ARIA Singles Chart for the issue dated June 30, 2025. The following week, it rose to number 60.

== Personnel ==
Credits adapted from Tidal.

- Sombr – vocals, bass guitar, drums, guitar, piano, recording engineer
- Kane Ritchotte – drums, percussion
- Mason Stoops – guitar, autoharp
- Benny Bock – piano, synthesizer
- Ruairi O'Flaherty – mastering engineer
- Rich Costey – mixing engineer
- Will Maclellan – recording engineer

== Charts ==
=== Weekly charts ===
Weekly chart performance
Chart (2025)	Peak position
Australia (ARIA)	60
Canada Hot 100 (Billboard)	83
Czech Republic Singles Digital (ČNS IFPI)	87
Global 200 (Billboard)	140
Ireland (IRMA)	35
Latvia Streaming (LaIPA)	18
Lithuania (AGATA)	28
New Zealand Hot Singles (RMNZ)	4
Norway (VG-lista)	98
Slovakia Singles Digital (ČNS IFPI)	97
UK Singles (Official Charts)	37
US Bubbling Under Hot 100 (Billboard)	4
US Hot Rock & Alternative Songs (Billboard)	13

=== Monthly charts ===
Monthly chart performance
Chart (2025)	Peak position
Lithuania Airplay (TopHit)	90

=== Year-end charts ===
Year-end chart performance
Chart (2025)	Position
US Hot Rock & Alternative Songs (Billboard)	56

== Certifications ==
Region	Certification	Certified units/sales
Canada (Music Canada)	Platinum	80,000^{‡}
New Zealand (RMNZ)	Gold	15,000^{‡}
United Kingdom (BPI)	Silver	200,000^{‡}
^{‡} Sales+streaming figures based on certification alone.
