= Undressed (Sombr song) =

Single by Sombr

from the album I Barely Know Her
- Released: March 21, 2025
- Length: 3:02
- Label: SMB; Warner
- Songwriter: Shane Boose
- Producers: Sombr; Tony Berg

Sombr singles chronology
"All I Ever Asked" (remix) (2025)	"Undressed" (2025)	"We Never Dated" (2025)

Music video
- "Undressed" on YouTube

"Undressed" is a song performed by American singer and songwriter Sombr. Written solely by Sombr and co-produced with Tony Berg, the song was released as a single from his debut studio album, I Barely Know Her, on March 21, 2025, through Warner Records and Sombr's own imprint SMB. "Undressed" was sent to US pop radio on May 13, 2025.

The song became Sombr's breakout hit, alongside "Back to Friends" (2024), both of which entered multiple song charts concurrently after going viral on the video-sharing app TikTok. The song topped the Irish Singles Chart, the airplay charts in the Czech Republic and Latvia, as well as the US Hot Rock & Alternative Songs chart, and peaked at number 16 on the Billboard Hot 100. Additionally, it reached the top ten in Australia, Belgium, Lebanon, New Zealand, Norway, and the United Kingdom. It has been certified platinum or higher in Australia, Austria, Canada, New Zealand, the United Kingdom, and the United States.

Sombr performed "Undressed" at the 2026 Brit Awards, where the song was nominated for International Song of the Year.

== Composition ==
"Undressed" was written solely by Sombr and co-produced with Tony Berg, who also produced Sombr's 2023 debut EP, In Another Life. Lyrically, the song speaks about not wanting to start a new relationship and reluctance to move on. The song is composed in the key of C major with a time signature of 4/4, and has a tempo of 116 beats per minute.

== Reception ==
=== Critical reception ===
The New York Times observed that the musical style of "Undressed" was inspired by previous decades, with Olivia Horn writing: "The sonic references for 'Undressed' encompass at least 40 years, from the dense harmonies of the Beach Boys to the ultra-compressed vocals of the Strokes." In June 2025, Billboard ranked "Undressed" no. 45 among the 50 best songs of the first half of the year, with Lipshutz also praising the song's retro style: "How can a 19-year-old channel the ghost of ‘90s alternative rock when he wasn’t even around to experience it?" Earlier in April 2025, Lipshutz described "Undressed" as "a ghostly warble-along with an equally outsized chorus".

Uproxx remarked about Sombr's promotion of the song through short excerpts on TikTok that the "snippets pale in comparison to fully realized record" and recommended Sombr as an "artist to watch".

For Melodic Magazine, Audrey Van Schagen complimented the music video as "filled with chaos, beauty and running".

=== Commercial performance ===
"Undressed", alongside Sombr's 2024 single "Back to Friends", experienced a notable rise in on-demand streaming numbers after gaining virality on the video-sharing platform TikTok, leading to its entry on various charts worldwide. On the Billboard Global 200, the song debuted at number 156 for the week ending April 12, 2025. In its seventh week, it entered the top 20, and later reached its peak at number 11 in its tenth week.

In the United States, "Undressed" debuted at number three on the Bubbling Under Hot 100 chart dated April 12, 2025. The following week, the song entered the Billboard Hot 100 at number 96, becoming Sombr's second entry on the chart after "Back to Friends", which debuted the week prior. In its sixth week, the song entered the top 40 at number 37, for the week of May 24, 2025. Following the release of its parent album, "Undressed" reached number 24 for the week ending September 6, 2025, and eventually entered the top 20 two weeks later, later peaking at number 16. On the rock and alternative genre charts, the song topped the Hot Rock & Alternative Songs chart, as well as the separate Hot Rock and Hot Alternative charts. It was certified platinum by the Recording Industry Association of America on November 12, 2025. In Canada, the song debuted at number 78 on the Canadian Hot 100 chart dated April 12, 2025, It entered the top 40 in its seventh week, and eventually reached the top 20 in its 25th week, later peaking at number 14. It has been certified quadruple platinum by Music Canada.

In the United Kingdom, "Undressed" debuted at number 65 on the UK Singles Chart for the week of March 28, 2025. The following week, it entered the top 40 at number 37, and in its ninth week, it reached a peak of number four. In Ireland, the song debuted at number 31 on the Irish Singles Chart and climbed into the top five in its fourth week. It eventually topped the chart on May 16, 2025, marking his first number-one in any country, and stayed at the top for four consecutive weeks. The song has been certified platinum by the British Phonographic Industry. Elsewhere in Europe, it reached the top 20 in Lithuania, Norway, Poland, and Sweden.

In Australia, "Undressed" debuted at number 35 on the ARIA Singles Chart dated April 7, 2025. In its sixth week, dated May 12, the song rose nine spots to its peak of number two, behind "Ordinary" by Alex Warren. In New Zealand, the song debuted at number 31 for the week beginning April 4, 2025. In its ninth week, dated May 30, it climbed to number two, also behind Warren's "Ordinary". It has been certified quadruple platinum by the Australian Recording Industry Association (ARIA) and double platinum by Recorded Music NZ (RMNZ).

== Music video ==
The music video, directed by Gus Black and featuring model Sephira Lily Street, was released on May 8, 2025.

== Live performance ==
On June 3, 2025, Sombr appeared on the BBC Radio 1's Live Lounge segment, performing "Undressed", alongside a cover of "Ribs" by Lorde. On July 23, 2025, Sombr performed the song on Jimmy Kimmel Live!, marking his second live television performance. On February 28, 2026, Sombr performed the song, along with "Back to Friends", at the 2026 Brit Awards.

== Personnel ==
Credits adapted from Tidal.

- Sombr – vocals, drums, guitar, keyboards, piano
- Kane Ritchotte – drums
- Benny Bock – keyboards, piano
- Ehren Ebbage – bass guitar
- Jay Rudolph – drums
- Will Graefe – guitar
- Luca Pretolesi – mastering engineer
- Will Maclellan – mixing engineer, recording engineer

== Charts ==
=== Weekly charts ===
Weekly chart performance for "Undressed"
Chart (2025–2026)	Peak position
Australia (ARIA)	2
Austria (Ö3 Austria Top 40)	8
Belgium (Ultratop 50 Flanders)	6
Belgium (Ultratop 50 Wallonia)	13
Canada Hot 100 (Billboard)	14
Canada CHR/Top 40 (Billboard)	8
Canada Hot AC (Billboard)	8
Canada Mainstream Rock (Billboard Canada)	31
CIS Airplay (TopHit)	61
Colombia Anglo Airplay (Monitor Latino)	9
Croatia International Airplay (Top lista)	48
Czech Republic Airplay (ČNS IFPI)	1
Czech Republic Singles Digital (ČNS IFPI)	15
Dominican Republic Anglo Airplay (Monitor Latino)	13
Denmark Airplay (Tracklisten)	5
Ecuador Anglo Airplay (Monitor Latino)	5
Estonia Airplay (TopHit)	17
France (SNEP)	94
Germany (GfK)	34
Global 200 (Billboard)	11
Greece International (IFPI)	24
Hungary (Editors' Choice Top 40)	40
Iceland (Tónlistinn)	19
Ireland (IRMA)	1
Latvia Airplay (LaIPA)	1
Latvia Streaming (LaIPA)	5
Lebanon (Lebanese Top 20)	3
Lithuania (AGATA)	11
Lithuania Airplay (TopHit)	38
Luxembourg (Billboard)	22
Malta Airplay (Radiomonitor)	10
Mexico Anglo Airplay (Monitor Latino)	12
Netherlands (Dutch Top 40)	5
Netherlands (Single Top 100)	12
New Zealand (Recorded Music NZ)	2
North Macedonia Airplay (Radiomonitor)	11
Norway (VG-lista)	6
Paraguay Anglo Airplay (Monitor Latino)	8
Peru Anglo Airplay (Monitor Latino)	12
Philippines (Philippines Hot 100)	65
Poland (Polish Airplay Top 100)	7
Poland (Polish Streaming Top 100)	17
Portugal (AFP)	91
Romania Airplay (TopHit)	182
Serbia Airplay (Radiomonitor)	13
Singapore (RIAS)	20
Slovakia Airplay (ČNS IFPI)	3
Slovakia Singles Digital (ČNS IFPI)	31
Slovenia Airplay (Radiomonitor)	8
Sweden (Sverigetopplistan)	15
Switzerland (Schweizer Hitparade)	18
Turkey International Airplay (Radiomonitor Türkiye)	5
UK Singles (Official Charts)	4
US Billboard Hot 100	16
US Adult Contemporary (Billboard)	19
US Adult Pop Airplay (Billboard)	4
US Dance Airplay (Billboard)	30
US Hot Rock & Alternative Songs (Billboard)	1
US Pop Airplay (Billboard)	4
US Rock & Alternative Airplay (Billboard)	28
Venezuela Airplay (Record Report)	41

=== Monthly charts ===
Monthly chart performance for "Undressed"
Chart (2025)	Peak position
CIS Airplay (TopHit)	66
Estonia Airplay (TopHit)	23
Lithuania Airplay (TopHit)	42

=== Year-end charts ===
Year-end chart performance for "Undressed"
Chart (2025)	Position
Australia (ARIA)	14
Austria (Ö3 Austria Top 40)	19
Belgium (Ultratop 50 Flanders)	25
Belgium (Ultratop 50 Wallonia)	96
Canada (Canadian Hot 100)	36
Canada CHR/Top 40 (Billboard)	46
Canada Hot AC (Billboard)	41
Canada Mainstream Rock (Billboard)	81
CIS Airplay (TopHit)	172
Estonia Airplay (TopHit)	44
Germany (GfK)	45
Global 200 (Billboard)	90
Iceland (Tónlistinn)	27
Lithuania Airplay (TopHit)	41
Netherlands (Dutch Top 40)	10
Netherlands (Single Top 100)	31
New Zealand (Recorded Music NZ)	17
Poland (Polish Airplay Top 100)	42
Poland (Polish Streaming Top 100)	71
Sweden (Sverigetopplistan)	43
Switzerland (Schweizer Hitparade)	41
UK Singles (OCC)	16
US Billboard Hot 100	42
US Adult Pop Airplay (Billboard)	18
US Hot Rock & Alternative Songs (Billboard)	9
US Pop Airplay (Billboard)	22

== Certifications ==
Certifications for "Undressed"
Region	Certification	Certified units/sales
Australia (ARIA)	4× Platinum	280,000^{‡}
Austria (IFPI Austria)	Platinum	30,000^{‡}
Canada (Music Canada)	4× Platinum	320,000^{‡}
Denmark (IFPI Danmark)	Gold	45,000^{‡}
France (SNEP)	Platinum	200,000^{‡}
Germany (BVMI)	Gold	300,000^{‡}
Netherlands (NVPI)	Platinum	93,000^{‡}
New Zealand (RMNZ)	3× Platinum	90,000^{‡}
Poland (ZPAV)	Platinum	125,000^{‡}
Spain (Promusicae)	Gold	50,000^{‡}
United Kingdom (BPI)	2× Platinum	1,200,000^{‡}
United States (RIAA)	Platinum	1,000,000^{‡}
Streaming
Greece (IFPI Greece)	Gold	1,000,000^{†}
Slovakia (ČNS IFPI)	Platinum	1,700,000
^{‡} Sales+streaming figures based on certification alone.^{†} Streaming-only figures based on certification alone.

== Release history ==
"Undressed" release history
Region	Date	Format	Label	Ref.
Various	March 21, 2025	Digital download; streaming	SMB; Warner	
United States	May 13, 2025	Contemporary hit radio	Warner	
Italy	September 5, 2025	Radio airplay	Warner Music Italy	
Various	November 7, 2025	7-inch single	SMB; Warner	
