= 12 to 12 =

Single by Sombr

from the album I Barely Know Her
- Released: July 24, 2025
- Genre: Disco; new wave; funk; synth-pop
- Length: 4:03
- Label: SMB; Warner
- Songwriter: Shane Boose
- Producers: Sombr; Tony Berg

Sombr singles chronology
"We Never Dated" (2025)	"12 to 12" (2025)	"Homewrecker" (2026)

Music video
- "12 to 12" on YouTube

"12 to 12" is a song by American singer-songwriter Sombr. It was released on July 24, 2025, through Warner Records and Sombr's imprint, SMB. Written solely by Sombr and co-produced by him and Tony Berg, it is the fourth single from his debut studio album, I Barely Know Her (2025). The song blends 1980s-style synth-pop and new wave with elements of 1970s funk and blues, and features Sombr's vocals shifting between falsetto and rough growls.

It was Sombr's third entry on the Billboard Hot 100, peaking at number 41, and became his third top-ten single in Australia, Ireland, New Zealand, and the United Kingdom; it also reached the top ten in five other countries. The song has been certified platinum or higher in Australia, Canada, New Zealand, and the United Kingdom. Sombr performed "12 to 12" at the 2025 MTV Video Music Awards, where it was nominated for Song of Summer, the 68th Annual Grammy Awards, and on Saturday Night Live. The song was ranked number eight in Triple J's Hottest 100 of 2025.

== Composition ==
"12 to 12" was compared to the work of Tame Impala, embracing the "ripple effect of nostalgia-driven '80s-inspired synth-pop and new wave". The track was described as walking the line between "repurposed funk with fuzzy blues licks" and hints of "bongo hits". Sombr's "shifting" vocals, alternating between a "lustful falsetto" and a "hungry, distorted growl" throughout the track were said to "ooze suave and mischievousness". Sombr sings to a love interest, uncertain whether his feelings are being reciprocated. As the song progresses, he begins to question whether pursuing the relationship was worth it, ultimately doubting his own self-worth.

"12 to 12" is composed in the key of E minor with a time signature of 4/4, and has a tempo of 124 beats per minute.

== Reception ==
=== Commercial performance ===
"12 to 12" became another notable commercial success for Sombr, serving as his fourth entry on the Billboard Global 200 and his third on the Billboard Hot 100. The single debuted at number 130 on the Global 200 for the week ending August 9, 2025, then jumped to number 91 the following week. Following the release of its parent album, the song surged 60 spots to number 37. For the week ending September 27, 2025, it reached a peak of number 22, marking his third top 25 entry.

On the Hot 100, "12 to 12" debuted at number 95 for the week ending August 16, 2025, after spending the previous week at number two on the Bubbling Under Hot 100. It dropped out of the Hot 100 the week after its debut but later re-entered at number 60 after the album's release. For the week of September 27, 2025, the single jumped 12 spots to its current peak at number 41, marking Sombr's third top 50 hit. Additionally, the song also marked Sombr's third top ten entry on the Hot Rock & Alternative Songs chart, peaking at number four. On the Canadian Hot 100, the song debuted at number 80, eventually reaching number 25 in its 22nd week. It has been certified triple platinum by Music Canada.

In both the United Kingdom and Ireland, "12 to 12" became Sombr's third top ten entry, peaking at numbers seven and four, respectively. The single debuted in both territories in the week of August 1, 2025. The song has been certified double platinum by the British Phonographic Industry. Elsewhere in Europe, it has reached the top ten in Austria (No. 4), Czech Republic (No. 7), Lithuania (No. 4), Norway (No. 5), and Sweden (No. 6), among others.

In Australia, "12 to 12" debuted at number 23 on the ARIA Singles Chart dated August 11, 2025, Two weeks later, it entered the top 20, and went on to peak at number six. In New Zealand, the single debuted at number 24 for the week beginning August 8, 2025; it later peaked at number 10 for the week of September 19, 2025. The song has been certified double platinum by the Australian Recording Industry Association and single platinum by the Recorded Music NZ.

=== Critical rankings ===
Publication	Accolade	Rank	Ref.
Billboard	The 100 Best Songs of 2025: Staff Picks	42	
Los Angeles Times	The 25 Best Songs of 2025	23	
NME	The 50 Best Songs of 2025	47	
NPR	The Best Songs of 2025	Unranked	
Variety	The Best Songs of 2025	Unranked	

== Music video ==
The accompanying music video, directed by Gus Black, was released on July 24, 2025, and features appearances by American singer and actress Addison Rae. The video opens with Sombr hosting a late-night show before being invited on as a guest, interviewing himself as the host. The camera then pans to Rae, seated in the audience, who begins to dance in a room that shifts between being empty and crowded. Additional scenes show Sombr floating unconscious in a pool.

== Live performance ==
On September 7, 2025, Sombr performed the song, along with "Back to Friends", at the 2025 MTV Video Music Awards. He also performed both songs on the November 8 episode of the 51st season of Saturday Night Live. In January 2026 Sombr performed the song for the Australian youth radio station Triple J's Like a Version weekly live music program. On February 1, 2026, Sombr performed the song at the 68th Annual Grammy Awards as part of the Best New Artist segment, marking his first appearance at the ceremony.

== Personnel ==
Credits are adapted from Tidal.

- Sombr – vocals, bass guitar, guitar, keyboards, piano, recording engineer
- Kane Ritchotte – drums, percussion
- Mason Stoops – guitar, bass guitar
- Benny Bock – keyboards, piano, synthesizer
- Wendy Melvoin – bass guitar
- Will Maclellan – percussion, recording engineer
- Tony Berg – piano
- Shawn Everett – mastering engineer, mixing engineer
- Greg Leisz – recording engineer

== Charts ==
=== Weekly charts ===
Weekly chart performance for "12 to 12"
Chart (2025–2026)	Peak position
Australia (ARIA)	6
Austria (Ö3 Austria Top 40)	4
Belarus Airplay (TopHit)	30
Belgium (Ultratop 50 Flanders)	14
Belgium (Ultratop 50 Wallonia)	42
Bolivia Anglo Airplay (Monitor Latino)	6
Canada Hot 100 (Billboard)	25
Canada Hot AC (Billboard)	31
Canada Modern Rock (Billboard Canada)	1
Central America Anglo Airplay (Monitor Latino)	13
Chile Anglo Airplay (Monitor Latino)	10
Colombia Anglo Airplay (Monitor Latino)	8
CIS Airplay (TopHit)	8
Costa Rica Anglo Airplay (Monitor Latino)	11
Croatia International Airplay (Top lista)	5
Czech Republic Singles Digital (ČNS IFPI)	7
Denmark (Tracklisten)	18
Ecuador Anglo Airplay (Monitor Latino)	9
Estonia Airplay (TopHit)	2
Finland Airplay (Radiosoittolista)	26
France (SNEP)	91
Germany (GfK)	47
Global 200 (Billboard)	22
Greece International (IFPI)	19
Guatemala Anglo Airplay (Monitor Latino)	7
Hungary (Single Top 40)	35
Iceland (Tónlistinn)	10
Ireland (IRMA)	4
Italy Airplay (EarOne)	8
Japan Hot Overseas (Billboard Japan)	9
Kazakhstan Airplay (TopHit)	28
Latin America Anglo Airplay (Monitor Latino)	13
Latvia Airplay (LaIPA)	3
Latvia Streaming (LaIPA)	4
Lebanon (Lebanese Top 20)	11
Lithuania (AGATA)	4
Luxembourg (Billboard)	15
Mexico Anglo Airplay (Monitor Latino)	18
Moldova Airplay (TopHit)	63
Netherlands (Dutch Top 40)	3
Netherlands (Single Top 100)	11
Netherlands Airplay (Radiomonitor)	5
New Zealand (Recorded Music NZ)	10
Nicaragua Anglo Airplay (Monitor Latino)	2
Nigeria Bubbling Under Hot 100 (TurnTable)	7
North Macedonia Airplay (Radiomonitor)	5
Norway (IFPI Norge)	5
Paraguay Anglo Airplay (Monitor Latino)	9
Poland (Polish Airplay Top 100)	2
Poland (Polish Streaming Top 100)	17
Portugal (AFP)	75
Romania Airplay (TopHit)	140
Russia Airplay (TopHit)	10
Serbia Airplay (Radiomonitor)	6
Slovakia Airplay (ČNS IFPI)	2
Slovakia Singles Digital (ČNS IFPI)	10
Slovenia Airplay (Radiomonitor)	11
Suriname (Nationale Top 40)	27
Sweden (Sverigetopplistan)	6
Switzerland (Schweizer Hitparade)	11
UK Singles (Official Charts)	7
US Billboard Hot 100	41
US Adult Pop Airplay (Billboard)	33
US Hot Rock & Alternative Songs (Billboard)	4
US Pop Airplay (Billboard)	40
US Rock & Alternative Airplay (Billboard)	15
Venezuela Airplay (Record Report)	47

=== Monthly charts ===
Monthly chart performance for "12 to 12"
Chart (2025–2026)	Peak position
Belarus Airplay (TopHit)	44
CIS Airplay (TopHit)	9
Estonia Airplay (TopHit)	3
Kazakhstan Airplay (TopHit)	31
Lithuania Airplay (TopHit)	27
Moldova Airplay (TopHit)	90
Russia Airplay (TopHit)	11

=== Year-end charts ===
Year-end chart performance for "12 to 12"
Chart (2025)	Position
Australia (ARIA)	52
Austria (Ö3 Austria Top 40)	46
Belgium (Ultratop 50 Flanders)	136
CIS Airplay (TopHit)	94
Estonia Airplay (TopHit)	37
Netherlands (Dutch Top 40)	48
Netherlands (Single Top 100)	81
Poland (Polish Airplay Top 100)	57
Russia Airplay (TopHit)	85
Switzerland (Schweizer Hitparade)	77
UK Singles (OCC)	68
US Hot Rock & Alternative Songs (Billboard)	26

== Certifications ==
Certifications for "12 to 12"
Region	Certification	Certified units/sales
Australia (ARIA)	3× Platinum	210,000^{‡}
Austria (IFPI Austria)	Platinum	30,000^{‡}
Canada (Music Canada)	3× Platinum	240,000^{‡}
Denmark (IFPI Danmark)	Platinum	90,000^{‡}
France (SNEP)	Platinum	200,000^{‡}
Germany (BVMI)	Gold	300,000^{‡}
Netherlands (NVPI)	Gold	46,500^{‡}
New Zealand (RMNZ)	2× Platinum	60,000^{‡}
Poland (ZPAV)	Platinum	125,000^{‡}
Portugal (AFP)	Platinum	25,000^{‡}
Spain (Promusicae)	Gold	50,000^{‡}
United Kingdom (BPI)	2× Platinum	1,200,000^{‡}
Streaming
Czech Republic (ČNS IFPI)	Platinum	5,000,000
Greece (IFPI Greece)	Platinum	2,000,000^{†}
Slovakia (ČNS IFPI)	Platinum	1,700,000
^{‡} Sales+streaming figures based on certification alone.^{†} Streaming-only figures based on certification alone.

== Release history ==
Release dates and formats for "12 to 12"
Region	Date	Format	Label	Ref.
Various	July 24, 2025	Digital download; streaming	SMB; Warner	
United States	September 16, 2025	Alternative radio	Warner	
Italy	October 31, 2025	Radio airplay	Warner	

== Notable covers ==
In March 2026, the Australian pop rock duo The Veronicas covered "12 to 12" for the youth radio station Triple J's Like a Version weekly music segment.
