= I Barely Know Her =

2025 studio album by Sombr

Studio album by Sombr
- Released: August 22, 2025
- Recorded: 2024
- Studio: Sound City Studios
- Genres: Pop; indie rock
- Length: 37:47
- Labels: SMB; Warner
- Producers: Sombr; Tony Berg

Sombr chronology
In Another Life (2023)	I Barely Know Her (2025)

Singles from I Barely Know Her
- 1. "Back to Friends" Released: December 27, 2024; 2. "Undressed" Released: March 21, 2025; 3. "We Never Dated" Released: June 20, 2025; 4. "12 to 12" Released: July 24, 2025

I Barely Know Her is the debut studio album by American singer-songwriter Sombr, released on August 22, 2025, through Warner Records and Sombr's own imprint, SMB. The album combines elements of pop and indie rock and features lyrics exploring themes of heartbreak, longing, self-reflection, and life in New York City. Entirely written by Sombr and produced with Tony Berg, it was supported by four singles: "Back to Friends", "Undressed", "We Never Dated", and "12 to 12", with the first two marking his commercial breakthrough.

I Barely Know Her received generally positive reviews, with critics praising its production and Sombr's songwriting, though some noted a lack of variety and reliance on familiar musical formulas. Commercially, the album reached the top five in Australia, the Czech Republic, Finland, Lithuania, New Zealand, Norway, Scotland, and Sweden, and charted within the top ten in twelve other countries, including the United States and the United Kingdom. To promote the album, Sombr embarked on his debut concert tour, The Late Nights & Young Romance Tour, which began in May 2025.

== Background and composition ==
Sombr announced his debut studio album, I Barely Know Her, on August 11, 2025, accompanied by the release of its full track listing. Written entirely by Sombr, the album included four of his recent singles: "Back to Friends" and "Undressed", which gained widespread attention after going viral on social media, as well as "We Never Dated" and "12 to 12".

The album incorporates elements of pop and indie rock, characterized by layered vocal harmonies and expanded instrumentation. Sombr co-produced the album with Tony Berg, performing guitar, keyboards, bass, and drums on most tracks. Lyrically, the album is structured as a breakup record, exploring themes of heartbreak, longing, and emotional self-reflection. Several songs reference New York City, contrasting romanticized imagery with depictions of everyday reality. Tracks such as "Undressed" and "Canal Street" address personal loss and nostalgia, while "12 to 12" and "Under the Mat" pair more upbeat arrangements with lyrics centered on emotional turmoil.

== Release and promotion ==
=== Singles ===
I Barely Know Her was preceded by four singles: "Back to Friends", "Undressed", "We Never Dated", and "12 to 12".

"Back to Friends", released on December 27, 2024, went viral on TikTok in early 2025 and topped the Spotify Global Weekly Chart in July. It became Sombr's first entry on both the Billboard Global 200 and the Hot 100, peaking at numbers five and 10, respectively, while also reaching number one on the Alternative Airplay and Hot Rock & Alternative Songs charts. Internationally, it reached the top five in Australia, Ireland, New Zealand, the Philippines, and Singapore, and the top ten in several other countries, eventually surpassing one billion streams on Spotify on October 20, 2025. Its music video was released on April 3, followed by Sombr's debut television performance on The Tonight Show Starring Jimmy Fallon on May 20, 2025.

The second single, "Undressed", was released on March 21, 2025, and experienced similar virality, peaking at number 16 on the Hot 100 and number 11 on the Global 200, while also topping the Hot Rock & Alternative Songs. Internationally, it reached number one in Ireland, and reached the top five in Australia, New Zealand, and the United Kingdom, among other countries. The music video was released on May 8, 2025. On July 23, Sombr performed the song on Jimmy Kimmel Live!.

The third and fourth singles, "We Never Dated" and "12 to 12", were released on June 20 and July 24, 2025, respectively. Both songs achieved moderate success, becoming Sombr's third and fourth entries on the Global 200. "12 to 12" became his third top-ten hit in Australia, Ireland, Norway, Sweden, and the United Kingdom. The music video for "12 to 12", featuring an appearance by Addison Rae, was released alongside the single.

=== Tour ===
Following the success of the first two singles, Sombr has embarked on his first solo concert tour The Late Nights & Young Romance Tour, announced in April 2025 and set to cover North America, Europe, Australia, and New Zealand. The North American and European legs began on May 25 and are scheduled to conclude on October 28. The tour will then continue with its Australia and New Zealand legs, starting on December 2 and ending on December 14. Additional European dates were announced in July 2025, with performances planned from February to March 2026.

== Critical reception ==
Professional ratings
Aggregate scores
Source	Rating
Metacritic	79/100
Review scores
Source	Rating
NME	4/5 stars
Rolling Stone	4/5 stars
Pitchfork	5.6/10
PopMatters	9/10
Variety	3/4 stars

I Barely Know Her received generally favorable reviews from critics. On Metacritic, which assigns a normalized score out of 100 to ratings from mainstream publications, the album received a weighted mean score of 79 based on six reviews, indicating "generally favourable".

Steven J. Horowitz of Variety praised the album as a confident and fully realized debut, noting that Sombr "elevates the bedroom pop of his earlier work, giving it a more muscular, swaggering sound" while maintaining the emotional vulnerability that defined his earlier singles. He described the album as "a breakup album in the traditional sense", highlighting tracks like "Undressed" and "Canal Street" for their intimacy and wistful lyricism, while commending upbeat songs such as "12 to 12" and "Under the Mat" for blending themes of heartbreak with vibrant production. Drawing comparisons to The Beach Boys' harmonies and Brian Wilson's vocal style, Horowitz also credited co-producer Tony Berg with broadening Sombr's sound and concluded that the album "marks a triumphant arrival" and "the first real statement from an artist with a clear vision and a sound that grows more distinct with each release."

In another positive review, Larisha Paul of Rolling Stone lauded the album for its "enamored, uninhibited" spirit and its ability to balance a romanticized vision of New York City with its harsher realities. She highlighted "12 to 12" for its "intoxicating scene" and "deep grooves", noting how Sombr "makes heartbreak sound alluring" through vivid storytelling and lush production alongside co-producer Tony Berg. Tracks like "Canal Street" were described as the album's emotional centerpiece, showcasing Sombr's "melancholy and melodies" and drawing comparisons to Olivia Rodrigo's "Traitor" while also commending tracks such as "Under the Mat" and "Come Closer" for their layered harmonies and confident performances. Paul concluded that Sombr's debut demonstrates "distinct internal confidence and external charm", positioning him as one of pop's most compelling emerging voices.

Ali Shutler of NME similarly praised I Barely Know Her as a smart and cathartic reimagining of the breakup album, framing it as a leap from Sombr's viral bedroom-pop roots into slick, festival-ready territory. While the early hits "Undressed" and "Back to Friends" are acknowledged as foundational, Shutler emphasized that the album's true strengths emerge in tracks like "Crushing", "Come Closer", "Dime", and "12 to 12". Shutler concluded that Sombr delivered a debut that feels both deeply personal and ambitiously expansive. Nina Kudlacz of The Luna Collective described the album as a debut that channels vulnerability through expressive songwriting and refined indie rock-infused arrangements, portraying it as a unifying and emotionally resonant record.

In a mixed review, Pavel Snapkou of Showbiz by PS noted the lack of effort put into the record, which affected its variety and led to monotony, comparing it to the works of viral TikTok artists whose full-length albums are often hastily built around a few hits. He remarked that "these songs could have stayed as standalone singles," but ultimately concluded that "what we got is a lazy, distortion-and-reverb-soaked project."

=== Year-end rankings ===
Publication	Accolade	Rank	Ref.
Billboard	The 50 Best Albums of 2025: Staff Picks	30	
PopMatters	The 25 Best Pop Albums of 2025	20	
Rolling Stone	The 100 Best Albums of 2025	100	

=== Accolades ===
List of awards and nominations for I Barely Know Her
Year	Award	Category	Result	Ref.
2026	American Music Awards	Breakthrough Album of the Year	Nominated	
2026	American Music Awards	Best Rock/Alternative Album	Won	
2026	iHeartRadio Music Awards	Favorite Debut Album	Nominated	
2026	iHeartRadio Music Awards	Alternative Album of the Year	Won	

== Commercial performance ==
In the United States, the album debuted at number 14 on the Billboard 200, earning 31,000 album-equivalent units in its first week, and at number two on the Top Rock & Alternative Albums. In the following week, it rose to number 12 on the Billboard 200 and topped the Rock & Alternative Albums chart, earning 27,000 album-equivalent units. The album reached number ten in its third week and maintained that position for another week, earning 29,000 album-equivalent units in both weeks. Based on the first four weeks, the album has sold 116,000 album-equivalent units. Following the release of its physical formats, the album jumped from number 27 to number 11 on Billboard 200 and returned to the top of the Top Rock & Alternative Albums. In Canada, the album debuted at number 12 and entered the top ten at number nine in its second week, and later peaked at number eight.

Internationally, the album performed strongly across Europe and Oceania, achieving its highest placement in Lithuania, where it debuted at number two. It peaked at number three in New Zealand, number four in Australia, the Czech Republic, Norway, and Sweden. and number five in Finland, Poland, and Scotland. Additionally, the album secured top-ten placements in Austria, Denmark, Iceland, Ireland, the Netherlands, Portugal, Slovakia, Switzerland, and the United Kingdom.

== Track listing ==
All tracks are written by Shane Boose and produced by Sombr and Tony Berg, except "Back to Friends" and "We Never Dated" which are produced solely by Sombr.

I Barely Know Her track listing
No.	Title	Length
1.	"Crushing"	3:26
2.	"12 to 12"	4:03
3.	"I Wish I Knew How to Quit You"	3:52
4.	"Back to Friends"	3:19
5.	"Canal Street"	5:05
6.	"Dime"	3:45
7.	"Undressed"	3:02
8.	"Come Closer"	3:15
9.	"We Never Dated"	3:17
10.	"Under the Mat"	4:45
Total length:		37:47

Notes

- All track titles are stylised in all lowercase.

== Personnel ==
Credits adapted from Tidal.

=== Musicians ===
- Sombr – vocals, guitar (all tracks), bass guitar (1–4, 6, 8, 9), drums (3, 4, 7, 9, 10), keyboards (1, 2–8, 10), programming (1, 6), percussion (3, 6, 8), piano (2, 4, 7, 9)
- Gabe Noel – bass guitar (1, 5, 8), cello (5)
- Kane Ritchotte – drums (1, 2, 4–6, 8–10), percussion (1, 2, 5, 6, 8–10)
- Mason Stoops – guitar (1–6, 8, 9), bass guitar (2), autoharp (9)
- Benny Bock – keyboards (1, 3, 4–8, 10), percussion (1, 10), piano (2, 4, 7, 9), synthesizer (2, 9)
- Wendy Melvoin – bass guitar (2, 10)
- Will Maclellan – percussion (2)
- Tony Berg – piano (2), guitar, percussion (10)
- Matt Chamberlain – drums, percussion (3)
- Ehren Ebbage – bass guitar (7)
- Jay Rudolph – drums (7)
- Will Graefe – guitar (7)
- Ryan Lerman – guitar (10)
- Chrisyius Whitehead – drums (1, 8, 10, 3)

=== Technical ===
- Shawn Everett – mastering engineer, mixing engineer (1–3, 5, 6, 8, 10)
- Luca Pretolesi – mastering engineer (4, 7)
- Ruairi O'Flaherty – mastering engineer (9)
- Rich Costey – mixing engineer (4, 9)
- Will Maclellan – mixing engineer (7), additional mixing engineer (3), recording engineer (1–3, 6–10)
- Sombr – recording engineer (1–3, 5, 6, 8–10)
- Benny Bock – recording engineer (1)
- Gregg White – recording engineer (4)
- Greg Leisz – recording engineer (2, 5, 6, 8)
- David Boucher – recording engineer (6)
- F.R. David – mixing engineer (all songs)

== Charts ==
=== Weekly charts ===
Weekly chart performance for I Barely Know Her
Chart (2025–2026)	Peak position
Australian Albums (ARIA)	4
Austrian Albums (Ö3 Austria)	6
Belgian Albums (Ultratop Flanders)	8
Belgian Albums (Ultratop Wallonia)	49
Canadian Albums (Billboard)	8
Croatian International Albums (HDU)	4
Czech Albums (ČNS IFPI)	4
Danish Albums (Hitlisten)	10
Dutch Albums (Album Top 100)	7
Finnish Albums (Suomen virallinen lista)	5
French Albums (SNEP)	29
German Albums (Offizielle Top 100)	12
German Rock & Metal Albums (Offizielle Top 100)	4
Hungarian Albums (MAHASZ)	11
Icelandic Albums (Tónlistinn)	7
Irish Albums (Official Charts)	6
Italian Albums (FIMI)	50
Japanese Download Albums (Billboard Japan)	62
Lithuanian Albums (AGATA)	2
New Zealand Albums (RMNZ)	3
Norwegian Albums (IFPI Norge)	4
Polish Albums (ZPAV)	5
Portuguese Albums (AFP)	9
Scottish Albums (Official Charts)	5
Slovak Albums (ČNS IFPI)	7
Spanish Albums (PROMUSICAE)	42
Swedish Albums (Sverigetopplistan)	4
Swiss Albums (Schweizer Hitparade)	9
UK Albums (Official Charts)	10
US Billboard 200	10
US Top Rock & Alternative Albums (Billboard)	1

=== Year-end charts ===
Year-end chart performance for I Barely Know Her
Chart (2025)	Position
Australian Albums (ARIA)	38
Austrian Albums (Ö3 Austria)	59
Belgian Albums (Ultratop Flanders)	109
Dutch Albums (Album Top 100)	64
French Albums (SNEP)	186
German Albums (Offizielle Top 100)	92
New Zealand Albums (RMNZ)	33
Polish Albums (ZPAV)	72
Swedish Albums (Sverigetopplistan)	59
UK Albums (OCC)	96

== Certifications ==
Certifications for I Barely Know Her
Region	Certification	Certified units/sales
Australia (ARIA)	Gold	35,000^{‡}
Austria (IFPI Austria)	Gold	7,500^{‡}
Canada (Music Canada)	2× Platinum	160,000^{‡}
Denmark (IFPI Danmark)	Gold	10,000^{‡}
France (SNEP)	Gold	50,000^{‡}
Italy (FIMI)	Gold	25,000^{‡}
Netherlands (NVPI)	Gold	18,600^{‡}
New Zealand (RMNZ)	Platinum	15,000^{‡}
Portugal (AFP)	Gold	3,500^{‡}
United Kingdom (BPI)	Gold	100,000^{‡}
^{‡} Sales+streaming figures based on certification alone.

== Release history ==
Release dates and formats for I Barely Know Her
Region	Date	Format	Label	Ref.
Various	August 22, 2025	Digital download; streaming	SMB; Warner	
Various	November 7, 2025	Cassette; CD; LP	SMB; Warner	
