= Sombr =

American singer and songwriter (born 2005)

- Sombr at the 2026 Met Gala
- Born: Shane Michael Boose; July 5, 2005 (age 21); New York City, U.S.
- Occupations: Singer; songwriter; record producer
- Years active: 2021–present
- Works: Discography
- Musical career
- Genres: Indie rock; indie pop; pop rock; alternative rock; alternative pop
- Instruments: Vocals; guitar; piano; bass; drums
- Labels: SMB; Warner
- Website: www.sombrmusic.com

Shane Michael Boose (born July 5, 2005), known professionally as Sombr (stylized in lowercase), is an American singer-songwriter and musician.

After signing to Warner Records, Sombr formed his own imprint label, SMB, and released his debut extended play (EP) In Another Life (2023). The singles "Back to Friends" and "Undressed" marked his first entries on the US Billboard Hot 100. His debut studio album, I Barely Know Her (2025), reached the top-ten on the Billboard 200 and earned him a Grammy Award nomination for Best New Artist. In 2026, he found further success with the singles "Homewrecker" and "My Body Isn't Ready".

== Early life ==
Shane Michael Boose was born on July 5, 2005, in New York City, and raised on the Lower East Side. He is the son of Andy Boose, who is the founder of AAB Productions, an event planning company, and Bennah Serfaty who works in PR at amFAR. His father is of German, Irish, and English descent and his mother is Jewish, with roots in Morocco, Lithuania, and Poland. Shane Boose attended LaGuardia High School as a vocal major but dropped out during his junior year after releasing "Caroline" in 2022. He is now based in Los Angeles.

Boose was introduced to GarageBand at the end of elementary school and began experimenting with layering tracks and harmonies. In middle school, he began using Logic Pro and learning production techniques through online tutorials. By high school, he had started pursuing music more seriously and focused on producing his own material rather than working with outside producers.

== Career ==
=== 2021–2024: Career beginnings ===
Boose adopted the stage name Sombr upon the release of his debut single, explaining that the name incorporated his initials (SMB) and reflected his emotional state at the time. He released his debut single, "Nothing Left to Say", in October 2021. In early 2023, after his fourth single, "Caroline", went viral, Sombr signed a record deal with Warner Records and released "Weak", his first single with the record label. In September 2023, he released his debut EP, In Another Life, co-produced by Tony Berg. On November 17, 2023, he released the single "Would've Been You", which samples Flawed Mangoes' "The Beginning".

=== 2025–present: Breakthrough and I Barely Know Her ===
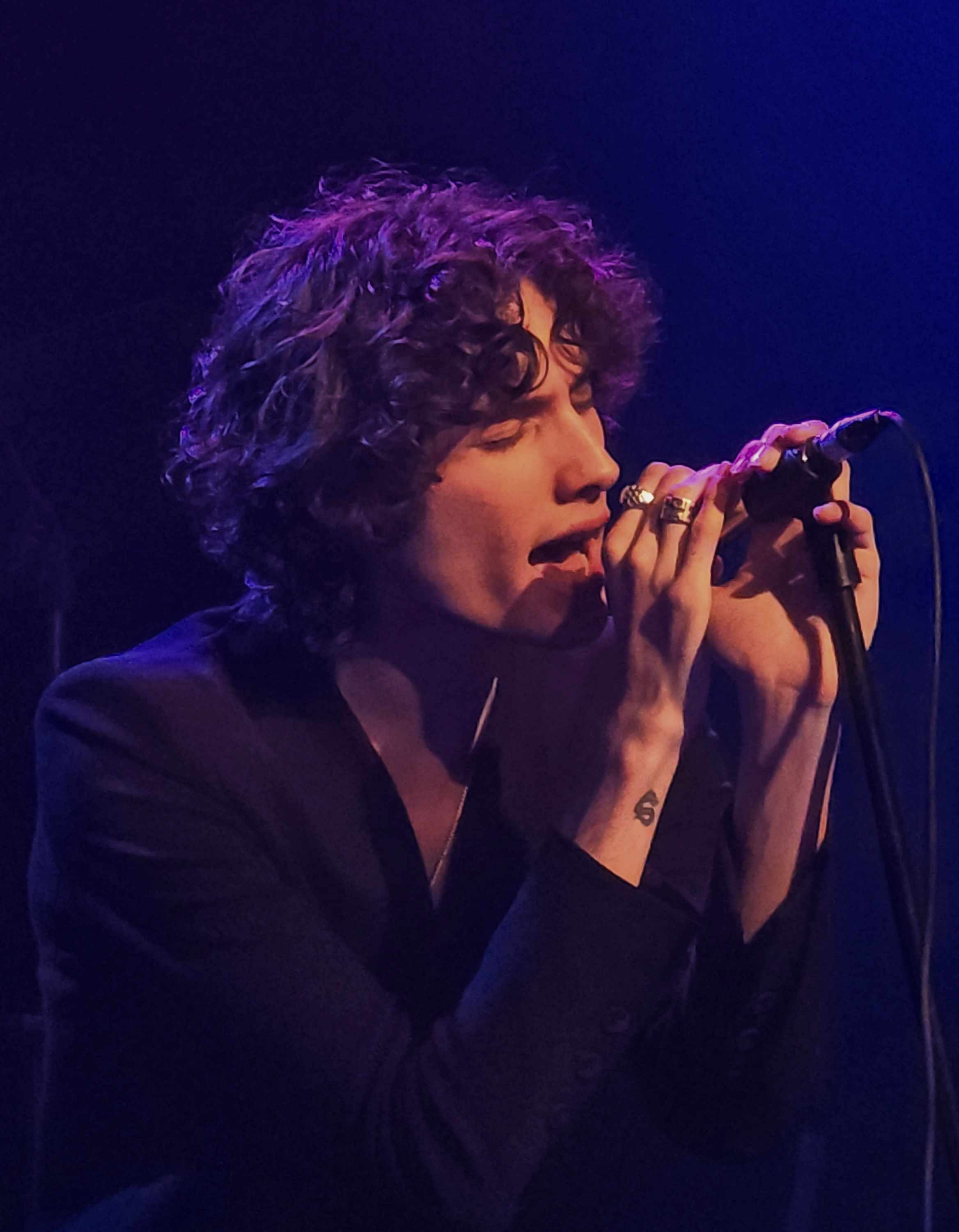
Sombr performing in London, 2025

On February 7, 2025 a remix of Rachel Chinouriri's song "All I Ever Asked" was released featuring Sombr.

In March 2025, Sombr earned widespread attention when his songs "Back to Friends" and "Undressed" gained popularity after going viral on the video-sharing app TikTok. The virality led to increased on-demand streams and chart appearances in several countries. The songs reached the top 20 on the Billboard Hot 100 and the Billboard Global 200. "Undressed" topped the Irish Singles Chart and entered the top five in Australia, New Zealand, and the United Kingdom. "Back to Friends" also reached the top five in Australia, Ireland, and New Zealand. The songs' success led to Sombr's first major award recognition, earning three nominations at the 2025 MTV Video Music Awards, including Best New Artist, winning one for Best Alternative Video (for "Back to Friends"). He was also among the performers at the award ceremony on September 7, 2025.

In April 2025, having previously performed as a supporting act on tours for Nessa Barrett and Daniel Seavey, Sombr announced his first solo concert tour, set to cover North America, Europe, Australia, and New Zealand. The North American and European legs began on May 25 in Dublin and are scheduled to conclude in Los Angeles on October 28. The Australia and New Zealand legs start on December 2 in Auckland and end on December 14 in Gold Coast. Additional European dates were announced in July 2025, with performances from February to March 2026, beginning in Stockholm and concluding in Dublin.

In May 2025, Sombr was featured on Billboard's annual 21 Under 21 list. He made his live television performance debut on The Tonight Show Starring Jimmy Fallon on May 20, performing "Back to Friends". On June 3, he appeared on BBC Radio 1's Live Lounge, performing "Undressed" and a cover of "Ribs" by Lorde. In July, he performed "Undressed" on Jimmy Kimmel Live!. Sombr has appeared on the SiriusXM and Audiotree live segments, which included covers of Mazzy Star's "Fade into You" and Radiohead's "Fake Plastic Trees", respectively. On June 17, 2025, Sombr announced the single "We Never Dated", released on June 20, which became his third top-40 hit in both Ireland and the United Kingdom. On July 25, he released the single "12 to 12", accompanied by a video featuring Addison Rae. The song was another notable success for Sombr, reaching the top ten in Australia, Ireland, Norway, Sweden, and the United Kingdom, and becoming his third song to enter the top 50 on the Hot 100 and Global 200.

On August 11, 2025, Sombr announced his debut album, I Barely Know Her, released on August 22. It includes the aforementioned four singles. It was favorably reviewed by Rolling Stone, NME, and Variety, and reached the top ten of several sales charts, including the Billboard 200 and the UK Albums Chart. At the 68th Annual Grammy Awards Sombr was nominated for Best New Artist. On February 6, 2026, he released the single "Homewrecker", his first release since his debut album. It peaked at number 16 on the Billboard Hot 100 and reached the top ten in Australia, Ireland, Latvia, New Zealand, and the United Kingdom, among others. On June 25, 2026, "My Body Isn't Ready" was released, which he performed live for the first time on the The Tonight Show Starring Jimmy Fallon on the day of its release.

On September 27, 2026, for the MTV VMAs, he danced on stage alongside Madonna and Charli XCX for the Danceteria performance.

== Artistry ==
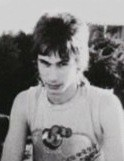
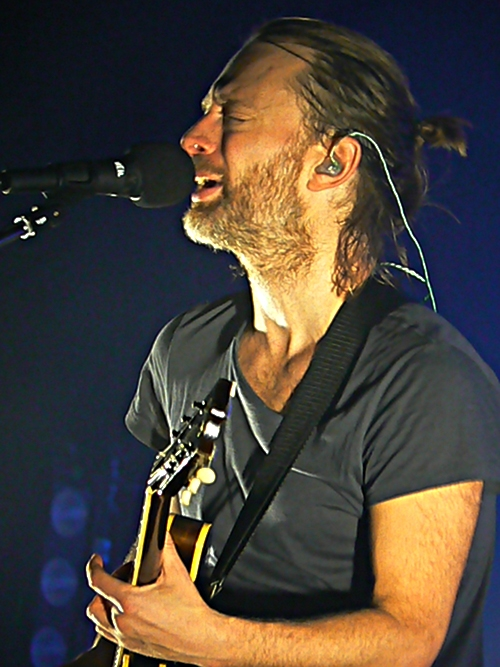
Sombr's major influences include Jeff Buckley (left) and Thom Yorke (right).

Sombr's musical genres have been described as indie rock, alternative rock, indie pop, alternative pop, and pop rock.

He has cited Jeff Buckley and Radiohead as his biggest musical influences. Buckley inspired Sombr vocally, with Sombr citing "Lover, You Should've Come Over" as one of his favorite songs. His father would play OK Computer around the house during his childhood, which shaped his appreciation for alternative rock. Other artists who have inspired him include the Velvet Underground, John Lennon, David Bowie, Elton John, Billie Eilish, Brian Wilson, the Rolling Stones, Prince, Oasis, and Taylor Swift. Sombr has been described as having a tenor vocal range.

== Discography ==
- I Barely Know Her (2025)

== Tours ==
=== Headlining ===
- The Late Nights & Young Romance Tour (2025–2026)
- You Are the Reason Tour (2026-2027)

=== Supporting ===
- Daniel Seavey – Second Wind Tour (2025)
- Nessa Barrett – Aftercare World Tour (2025)

== Awards and nominations ==
List of awards and nominations for Sombr
Award	Year	Nominee / Work	Category	Result	Ref.
American Music Awards	2026	Himself	New Artist of the Year	Nominated	
American Music Awards	2026	Himself	Breakthrough Rock/Alternative Artist	Won	
American Music Awards	2026	"Back to Friends"	Song of the Year	Nominated	
American Music Awards	2026	"Back to Friends"	Best Rock/Alternative Song	Won	
American Music Awards	2026	"Homewrecker"	Song of the Summer	Nominated	
American Music Awards	2026	I Barely Know Her	Breakthrough Album of the Year	Nominated	
American Music Awards	2026	I Barely Know Her	Best Rock/Alternative Album	Won	
ARIA Music Awards	2026	Himself	Most Popular International Artist	Nominated	
BBC Radio 1 Sound of...	2026	Himself	Sound of 2026	Third	
Brit Awards	2026	Himself	International Artist of the Year	Nominated	
Brit Awards	2026	"Undressed"	Best International Song	Nominated	
Grammy Awards	2026	Himself	Best New Artist	Nominated	
iHeartRadio Music Awards	2026	Himself	Best New Artist (Pop)	Nominated	
iHeartRadio Music Awards	2026	Himself	Best New Artist (Alternative)	Won	
iHeartRadio Music Awards	2026	"Back to Friends"	Alternative Song of the Year	Nominated	
iHeartRadio Music Awards	2026	"Back to Friends"	On the Verge - Alternative	Won	
iHeartRadio Music Awards	2026	"Undressed"	Best Lyrics	Nominated	
iHeartRadio Music Awards	2026	"Undressed"	On the Verge - Pop	Won	
iHeartRadio Music Awards	2026	I Barely Know Her	Favorite Debut Album	Nominated	
iHeartRadio Music Awards	2026	I Barely Know Her	Alternative Album of the Year	Won	
Los 40 Music Awards	2025	Himself	Best International New Artist	Nominated	
MTV Video Music Awards	2025	Himself	Best New Artist	Nominated	
MTV Video Music Awards	2025	"Back to Friends"	Best Alternative Video	Won	
MTV Video Music Awards	2025	"12 to 12"	Song of Summer	Nominated	
MTV Video Music Awards	2026	"Homewrecker	Best Alternative	Nominated	
MTV Video Music Awards	2026	"Homewrecker	Song of Summer	Nominated	
MTV Video Music Awards	2026	"My Body Isn't Ready"	Best Art Direction	Nominated	
MTV Video Music Awards Japan	2026	"12 to 12"	Best New Artist Video -International-	Won	
Nickelodeon Kids' Choice Awards	2026	Himself	Favorite Male Breakout Artist/Group	Won	
NRJ Music Award	2025	Himself	International Breakthrough of the Year	Nominated	
Swiss Music Awards	2026	Himself	Best International Breaking Act	Nominated	
