= Back to Friends =

Single by Sombr

from the album I Barely Know Her
- Released: December 27, 2024
- Genre: Indie pop
- Length: 3:19
- Label: SMB; Warner
- Songwriter: Shane Boose
- Producer: Sombr

Sombr singles chronology
"Makes Me Want You" (2024)	"Back to Friends" (2024)	"All I Ever Asked" (remix) (2025)

Music video
- "Back to Friends" on YouTube

"Back to Friends" is a song by the American singer and songwriter Sombr, solely written and produced by him. It was released on December 27, 2024, through Warner Records and Sombr's own imprint SMB. It served as the lead single from Sombr's debut studio album, I Barely Know Her (2025). The song was sent to US pop radio on October 7, 2025.

The single became a global hit and Sombr's breakout song, alongside "Undressed" (2025), both of which entered multiple song charts concurrently after going viral on the video-sharing app TikTok. In the US, "Back to Friends" marked his first and highest-charting entry on the Billboard Hot 100 to date, entering the Billboard Hot 100 on April 12, 2025, and peaking at number seven. It left the Hot 100 in April 2026 after 52 consecutive weeks. Outside the United States, the song reached the top five of the music charts in Australia, Austria, the Czech Republic, Ireland, Latvia, Lithuania, Luxembourg, New Zealand, the Philippines, Singapore, and Switzerland. It has been certified platinum or higher in Australia, Austria, Canada, France, New Zealand, Portugal, the United Kingdom, and the United States. Lyrically, the song is about the melodrama of teenage love.

Sombr has performed the song at The Tonight Show Starring Jimmy Fallon, Saturday Night Live, the 2025 MTV Video Music Awards, where its music video won Best Alternative Video, marking his first award win, and the 2026 Brit Awards.

== Composition and lyrics ==
"Back to Friends" is an indie pop song solely written and produced by Sombr himself. Lyrically, the song captures the melodrama of teenage love. The song is composed in the key of D-flat major with a time signature of 4/4, and has a tempo of 93 beats per minute.

== Reception ==
=== Commercial performance ===
"Back to Friends" experienced a significant surge in on-demand streams in March 2025 after going viral on the video-sharing platform TikTok. The song subsequently debuted at number 140 on the Billboard Global 200 for the chart dated April 5, 2025, marking Sombr's first entry on the chart. In its tenth week, it entered the top ten at number nine, and later peaked at number five on the chart dated September 27, 2025.

In the United States, "Back to Friends" debuted at number eight on the Bubbling Under Hot 100 chart dated April 5, 2025. The following week, the song entered the Billboard Hot 100 at number 90, becoming Sombr's first appearance on the chart. In its ninth week, it jumped 26 spots from number 62 to enter the top 40 at number 36. In its 40th week, it reached the top ten at number seven on the chart dated January 10, 2026, becoming his highest-charting single and first top-ten entry on the chart. "Back to Friends" also marked Sombr's first appearance on several rock and alternative charts, including topping the Hot Rock & Alternative Songs for 16 weeks as of February 21, 2026. In addition to rising streams, the song gained increased radio airplay, topping the Alternative Airplay and Pop Airplay charts, and reaching number two on the Rock & Alternative Airplay chart. It was certified platinum by the Recording Industry Association of America on November 12, 2025. In Canada, the song debuted at number 74 on the Canadian Hot 100 for the week of April 12, 2025, and reached number 9 in its 30th week. It has been certified seven times platinum by Music Canada.

In the United Kingdom, "Back to Friends" debuted at number 97 on the UK Singles Chart for the week of March 14, 2025, and peaked at number seven in its thirteenth week. In Ireland, the song debuted at number 33 on the Irish Singles Chart for the week of March 28, 2025, and reached number four in its fourteenth week, becoming Sombr's second top-five single in the country, following "Undressed". The song has been certified platinum by the British Phonographic Industry. Elsewhere in Europe, it achieved top five positions in Austria (No. 3), the Czech Republic (No. 3), Lithuania (No. 2), Luxembourg (No. 5), and Switzerland (No. 3), and entered the top ten in Germany (No. 7), Greece (No. 6), and Sweden (No. 7).

In Australia, "Back to Friends" debuted at number 39 on the ARIA Singles Chart dated April 14, 2025, and peaked at number three in its seventh week. In New Zealand, it debuted at number 36 for the week beginning April 4, 2025, and reached number four in its ninth week. The song has been certified quadruple platinum by the Australian Recording Industry Association (ARIA) and double platinum by the Recorded Music NZ (RMNZ). In Southeast Asia, "Back to Friends" reached the top five in the Philippines and Singapore, the top ten in Malaysia, and the top 20 in Indonesia.

According to the International Federation of the Phonographic Industry, "Back to Friends" was the 16th best-selling song of 2025, with over 970 million units worldwide, based on a combination of subscription and ad-supported streaming activity and digital downloads.

=== Critical response ===
In June 2025, Rolling Stone named "Back to Friends" one of the year's best songs so far, highlighting Sombr's ability to channel the nostalgic 2014 Tumblr grunge aesthetic era. The magazine also wrote that "the indie pop record plays out like an impassioned conversation that bleeds through the walls and captures the melodrama of teenage love". In December, the magazine ranked the song the 27th best song of the year. The song was also included in The New York Times's Jon Caramanica's year-end list.

== Music video ==
The music video, directed by Gus Black, was released on April 3, 2025, and features model Charlotte D'Alessio. It won Best Alternative Video at the 2025 MTV Video Music Awards.

== Live performances ==
On May 20, 2025, Sombr performed "Back to Friends" on The Tonight Show Starring Jimmy Fallon, marking his television performance debut. On September 2, he performed the song as part of his recognition as MTV's Global Push Artist for the month. Sombr later performed the song again, along with "12 to 12", at the 2025 MTV Video Music Awards, which took place on September 7. Both songs were performed again on the November 8 episode of the 51st season of Saturday Night Live. On December 22, he performed the song alongside the Jonas Brothers, after he was invited as a surprise guest at the Brooklyn stop of Jonas20: Greetings from Your Hometown Tour. On February 28, 2026, Sombr performed the song, along with "Undressed", at the 2026 Brit Awards.

== Personnel ==
Credits adapted from Tidal.

- Sombr – vocals, bass guitar, drums, guitar, keyboards, piano, recording engineer
- Kane Ritchotte – drums
- Mason Stoops – guitar
- Benny Bock – keyboards, piano
- Shawn Everett – mastering engineer, mixing engineer
- Luca Pretolesi – mastering engineer
- Rich Costey – mixing engineer
- Will Maclellan – recording engineer
- Gregg White – recording engineer

== Charts ==
=== Weekly charts ===
Weekly chart performance for "Back to Friends"
Chart (2025–2026)	Peak position
Australia (ARIA)	3
Austria (Ö3 Austria Top 40)	3
Belgium (Ultratop 50 Flanders)	48
Bolivia Anglo Airplay (Monitor Latino)	9
Canada Hot 100 (Billboard)	9
Canada CHR/Top 40 (Billboard)	3
Canada Hot AC (Billboard)	6
Canada Mainstream Rock (Billboard Canada)	36
Canada Modern Rock (Billboard Canada)	5
Colombia Anglo Airplay (Monitor Latino)	10
CIS Airplay (TopHit)	100
Costa Rica Anglo Airplay (Monitor Latino)	8
Czech Republic Singles Digital (ČNS IFPI)	3
Dominican Republic Anglo Airplay (Monitor Latino)	7
Ecuador Anglo Airplay (Monitor Latino)	10
Estonia Airplay (TopHit)	151
Finland (Suomen virallinen lista)	42
France (SNEP)	84
Germany (GfK)	7
Global 200 (Billboard)	5
Greece International (IFPI)	6
Guatemala Anglo Airplay (Monitor Latino)	7
Iceland (Tónlistinn)	15
India International (IMI)	4
Indonesia (IFPI)	13
Ireland (IRMA)	4
Israel (Mako Hitlist)	66
Italy (FIMI)	45
Japan Hot Overseas (Billboard Japan)	4
Latvia Airplay (LaIPA)	4
Latvia Streaming (LaIPA)	2
Lithuania (AGATA)	2
Luxembourg (Billboard)	5
Malaysia (IFPI)	8
Malaysia International (RIM)	4
Mexico Anglo Airplay (Monitor Latino)	9
Middle East and North Africa (IFPI)	19
Netherlands (Single Top 100)	17
New Zealand (Recorded Music NZ)	4
Norway (VG-lista)	12
Panama Anglo Airplay (Monitor Latino)	14
Panama Streaming (PRODUCE)	104
Paraguay Anglo Airplay (Monitor Latino)	5
Philippines (IFPI)	3
Philippines Hot 100 (Billboard Philippines)	2
Poland Airplay (OLiS)	5
Poland Streaming (OLiS)	18
Portugal (AFP)	18
San Marino Airplay (SMRTV Top 50)	27
Singapore (RIAS)	4
Slovakia Airplay (ČNS IFPI)	22
Slovakia Singles Digital (ČNS IFPI)	11
Spain Airplay (Promusicae)	7
Sweden (Sverigetopplistan)	7
Switzerland (Schweizer Hitparade)	3
United Arab Emirates (IFPI)	9
UK Singles (Official Charts)	7
US Billboard Hot 100	7
US Adult Contemporary (Billboard)	13
US Adult Pop Airplay (Billboard)	2
US Hot Rock & Alternative Songs (Billboard)	1
US Pop Airplay (Billboard)	1
US Rock & Alternative Airplay (Billboard)	2
Venezuela Airplay (Record Report)	22

=== Monthly charts ===
Monthly chart performance for "Back to Friends"
Chart (2025–2026)	Peak position
Lithuania Airplay (TopHit)	34
Panama Streaming (PRODUCE)	119
Paraguay Airplay (SGP)	61

=== Year-end charts ===
Year-end chart performance for "Back to Friends"
Chart (2025)	Position
Australia (ARIA)	12
Austria (Ö3 Austria Top 40)	17
Belgium (Ultratop 50 Flanders)	86
Belgium (Ultratop 50 Wallonia)	159
Canada (Canadian Hot 100)	37
Canada Modern Rock (Billboard)	41
Germany (GfK)	29
Global 200 (Billboard)	35
Iceland (Tónlistinn)	37
India International (IMI)	20
Lithuania Airplay (TopHit)	65
Netherlands (Single Top 100)	35
New Zealand (Recorded Music NZ)	11
Philippines (Philippines Hot 100)	13
Poland (Polish Streaming Top 100)	31
Sweden (Sverigetopplistan)	23
Switzerland (Schweizer Hitparade)	20
UK Singles (OCC)	15
US Billboard Hot 100	44
US Hot Rock & Alternative Songs (Billboard)	10
US Rock & Alternative Airplay (Billboard)	9

== Certifications ==
Certifications for "Back to Friends"
Region	Certification	Certified units/sales
Australia (ARIA)	5× Platinum	350,000^{‡}
Austria (IFPI Austria)	2× Platinum	60,000^{‡}
Canada (Music Canada)	7× Platinum	560,000^{‡}
Denmark (IFPI Danmark)	Gold	45,000^{‡}
France (SNEP)	Diamond	333,333^{‡}
Germany (BVMI)	Gold	300,000^{‡}
Italy (FIMI)	Platinum	200,000^{‡}
Netherlands (NVPI)	Platinum	93,000^{‡}
New Zealand (RMNZ)	4× Platinum	120,000^{‡}
Poland (ZPAV)	Platinum	125,000^{‡}
Portugal (AFP)	3× Platinum	75,000^{‡}
Spain (Promusicae)	Platinum	100,000^{‡}
United Kingdom (BPI)	2× Platinum	1,200,000^{‡}
United States (RIAA)	Platinum	1,000,000^{‡}
Streaming
Czech Republic (ČNS IFPI)	Platinum	5,000,000
Greece (IFPI Greece)	Platinum	2,000,000^{†}
Slovakia (ČNS IFPI)	Platinum	1,700,000
^{‡} Sales+streaming figures based on certification alone.^{†} Streaming-only figures based on certification alone.

== Release history ==
Release dates and formats for "Back to Friends"
Region	Date	Format	Label	Ref.
Various	December 27, 2024	Digital download; streaming	SMB; Warner	
Italy	April 11, 2025	Radio airplay	Warner Music Italy	
United States	April 15, 2025	Alternative radio	Warner	
United States	October 7, 2025	Contemporary hit radio	Warner	
Various	November 7, 2025	7-inch single	SMB; Warner	
