= Tony Berg =

American musician (born 1954)

- Berg in 2023
- Born: Anthony Rains Berg; October 21, 1954 (age 72)
- Occupations: musician; record producer; A&R representative
- Spouse: Cary Smith
- Children: 3, including Z Berg

Anthony Rains Berg (born October 21, 1954) is an American musician, record producer, and A&R representative, in which role he has been described as an "industry guru".

As a high school student, he spent a year at SYA France, School Year Abroad's program located in Rennes. In 2026, he was the recipient of its Distinguished Alumni Award.

== Professional career ==
Berg's early career began as the musical director of the Mark Taper Forum at the Los Angeles Music Center, where he worked on productions including Me and Bessie and Tooth of Crime. He was the guitarist in the American debut production of The Rocky Horror Show which was performed for a year at the Roxy Theatre.

Soon after, he met and was mentored by Jack Nitzsche. Under Jack's guidance, they worked with The Neville Brothers.

In 1978, he began a three-year tenure as Bette Midler’s musical director, touring the country and working on the album Divine Madness.

As a composer, he wrote and arranged music for Robert Altman’s A Perfect Couple, writing for the Los Angeles Philharmonic, and several movies of the week.

Berg's music career began in the late 1970s as a session guitarist who appeared on notable releases by artists including Air Supply and Debby Boone, as well as on The Rocky Horror Picture Show LP and several Muppet Show records. In the early 1980s, Berg founded Zeitgeist Studios. His first major success was with Michael Penn's 1989 debut March. From there Berg went on to produce for Edie Brickell, Public Image Ltd, Altered State, Aimee Mann, and numerous other artists.

In the early 1990s, Berg became an A&R executive with Geffen Records, where he played a role in signing artists including Beck, Wild Colonials, Black Rebel Motorcycle Club, and At the Drive-In. During this time he continued to produce records and play on a wide variety of releases, among them Peter Gabriel's Up.

Berg's career as a record producer first garnered attention with the release of Michael Penn’s debut album, March. This was followed by productions of music by Aimee Mann, The Replacements, Squeeze, Public Image Ltd, Wendy & Lisa, Edie Brickell & The New Bohemians, and X.

In 2004, Berg founded, 3 Records, with industry veteran Michael Rosenblatt and producer Eric Valentine. Their first release was Mellowdrone's Box.

In 2006, Berg shifted his focus entirely on working with developing artists and producing. During this time, he built mentor/mentee relationships with Blake Mills, Ethan Gruska, and Shawn Everett. Berg also began working with Phoebe Bridgers while working on her first album, Stranger in the Alps.

Berg has owned and run Zeitgeist Studio in Los Angeles since 1985, which served as the incubator for dozens of Los Angeles-based recording artists, including Dawes and Phantom Planet. In 2018, Berg and Mills took over the lease for Sound City Studios in Van Nuys. There, Berg has produced recordings by Bridgers, Sarah McLachlan, Bruce Hornsby, Katie Gavin, Amythyst Kiah, Fiona Apple, Nina Gordon, boygenius, Molly Tuttle, Victoria Canal, Andrew Bird, and Switchfoot.

In 2023, Berg began working with Warner Records recording artist, Sombr. Sombr’s debut album, I Barely Know Her, was released on August 22, 2025 which Berg co-produced.

== Personal life ==
Berg has been married to Cary Smith, a former actress and teacher, for 42 years. Their children are Alexandra, an artist and Masters program graduate of The Royal Academy of Art in London; Z Berg, a recording artist and producer; and Thomas, a musician and music retail professional. His brothers are Pulitzer Prize-winning biographer and journalist A. Scott Berg, Jeff Berg, former CEO of International Creative Management, and Rick Berg, a partner and manager at the production company Code Entertainment.

== Discography ==
Producer
Michael Penn, March (1989)
Altered State, Altered State (1991)
Squeeze, Play (1991)
Murray Attaway, In Thrall (1993)
Wild Colonials, This Can't Be Life (1996)

(Co-produced with John Porter)

Pete Yorn, Nightcrawler (2006)
Phantom Planet, Raise the Dead (2008)
Jared & The Mill, Life We Chose - EP (2015)
Andrew Bird, Are You Serious (2016)
Phoebe Bridgers, Stranger in the Alps (2017)
Phantom Planet, Devastator (2020)
Phoebe Bridgers, Punisher (2020)
Phoebe Bridgers, Lost Weekend (2026)
Switchfoot, Interrobang (2021)
Taylor Swift, Red (Taylor's Version) (2021)

(vocal production on "Nothing New")

Ben Zaidi, Acre of Salt. (2022)
KALI, Maltman and Effie (2022)
Boygenius, The Record (2023)

(Additional producer)

Lizzy McAlpine, Broken Glass (2024)
Katie Gavin, What A Relief (2024)
Jake Minch, George (2025)
Sombr, I Barely Know Her (2025)
Phoeboe Bridgers, Lost Weekend, (2026)
