= Hot Rock & Alternative Songs =

American record chart by Billboard Magazine

Hot Rock & Alternative Songs (formerly known as Rock Songs and Hot Rock Songs) is a record chart published by Billboard magazine. From its debut on June 20, 2009, through October 13, 2012, the chart ranked the airplay of songs across alternative, mainstream rock, and triple A radio stations in the United States. Beginning with the chart dated October 20, 2012, the chart has followed the methodology of the Billboard Hot 100 by incorporating digital download sales, streaming data, and radio airplay of rock songs over all formats. From that time until mid-2020, only the performance of core rock songs, including those with an "alternative bent", were tabulated and ranked for the chart. In the chart dated June 13, 2020, Billboard revamped the chart to permit a broader selection of songs considered alternative "hybrids" with other genres and renamed it to Hot Rock & Alternative Songs.

== Number ones ==
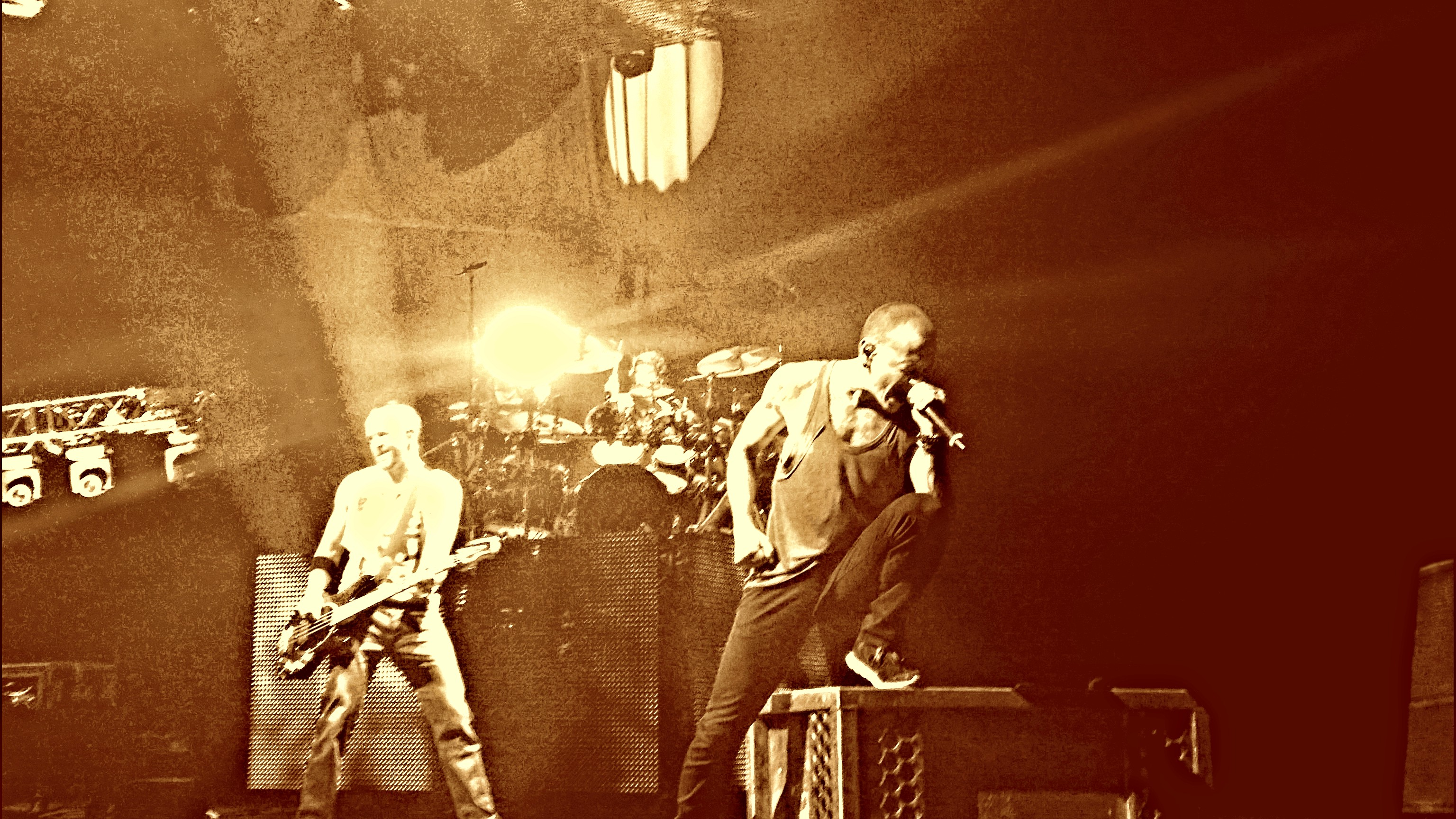
Linkin Park spent 28 weeks atop the chart with three number-one songs. The band also holds the record for most songs to chart in a single week with 23.

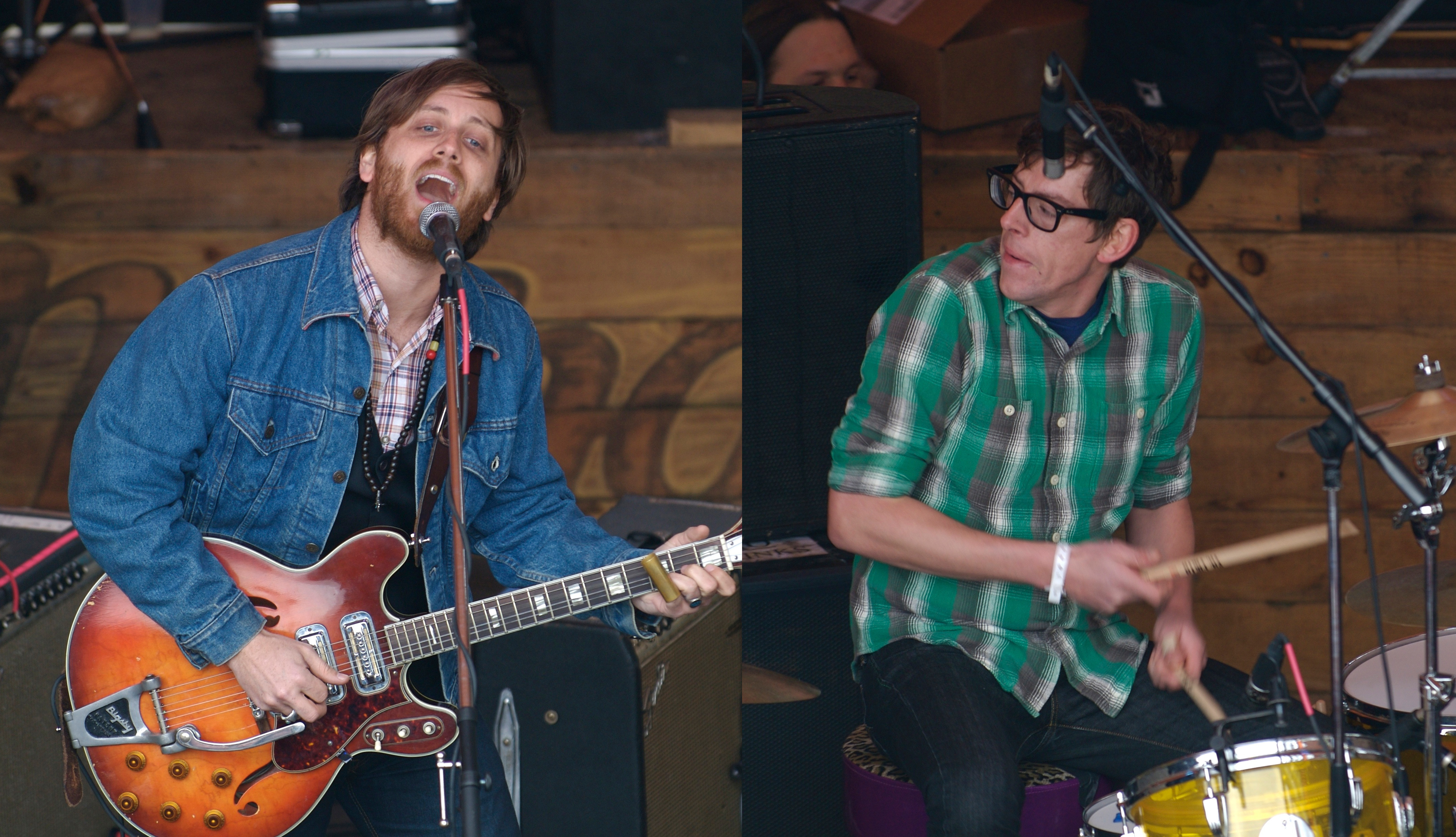
The Black Keys' "Lonely Boy" spent 14 weeks atop the chart in 2011, and was later ranked as the year-end number-one song.

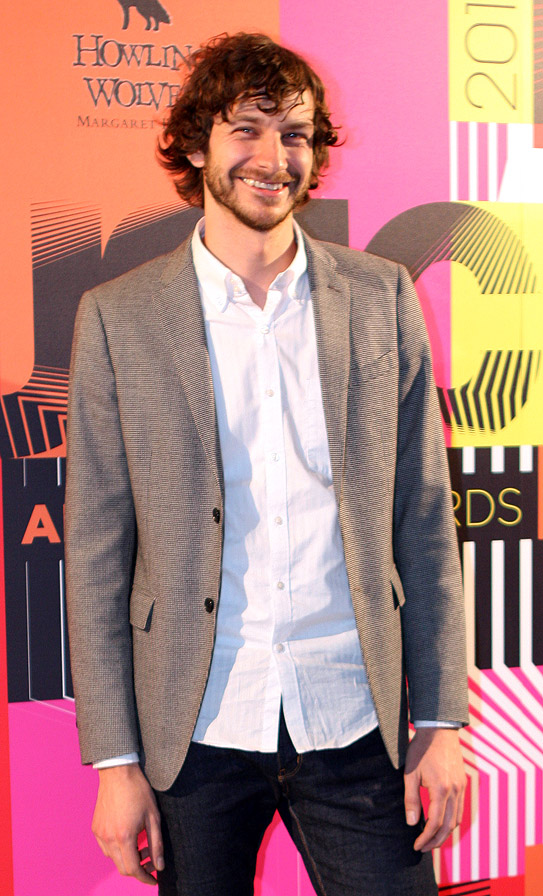
Gotye became the first solo artist to reach the number-one position, with the single "Somebody That I Used to Know" in 2012.

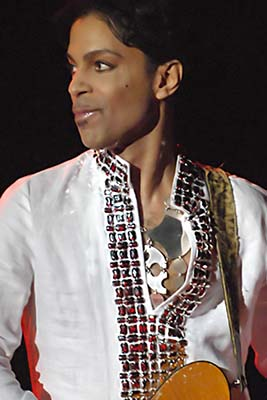
Prince's single "Purple Rain" is the first posthumous number-one single, reaching the number-one position after his death in April 2016.

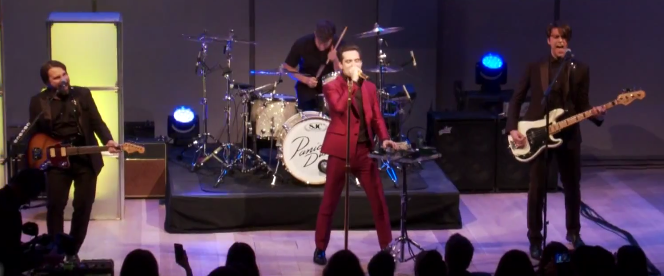
Panic! at the Disco's single "High Hopes" is the longest running number-one single.

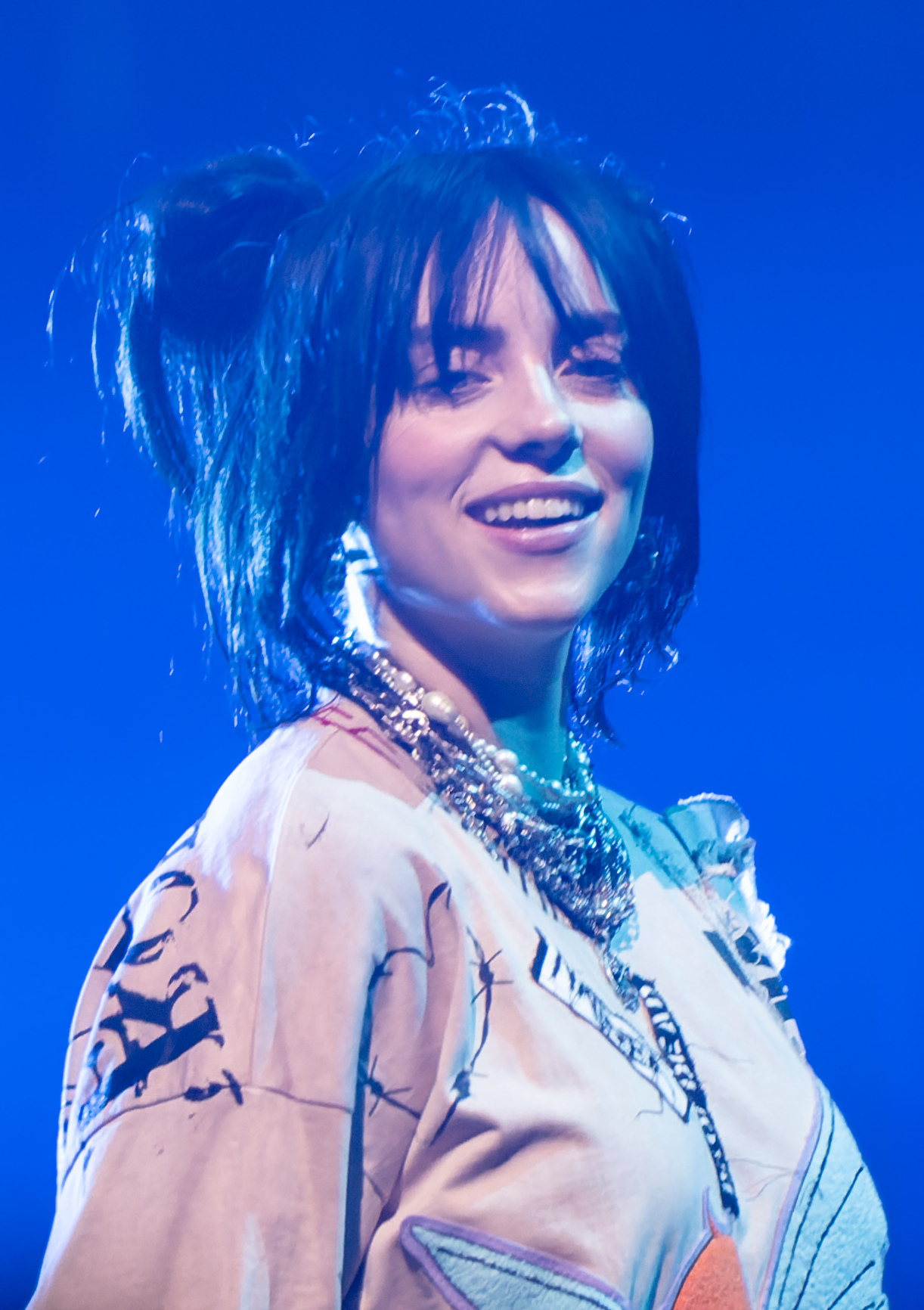
Billie Eilish has spent the most weeks atop the chart for a solo artist and is tied with Imagine Dragons with the most number-one songs by an artist with five each. Her 2024 single, "Birds of a Feather", was the second song, after Panic! at the Disco's "High Hopes", to spend more than a year at number one.

The first number-one track on the chart was Green Day's "Know Your Enemy". Since its introduction, 81 songs have reached the number-one position on chart. Imagine Dragons and Billie Eilish are tied with the most with five each, with Imagine Dragons having a total of 104 weeks at number one on the chart. Panic! at the Disco's "High Hopes" spent a record 65 non-consecutive weeks atop the chart, and along with their song "Hey Look Ma, I Made It", the band claimed the number-one spot on the chart for the entirety of 2019.

Key
No.	Number of single to top the chart
re	Return of a single to number one
†	Billboard year-end number-one song (Note: Songs that have appeared as the number-one rock song of the year, but did not reach number one on the weekly charts and are not included are Kings of Leon's "Use Somebody" (2009, number 2), and Rise Against's "Savior" (2010, number 3).)

Number-one songs with artist, date, time spent, and references
No.	Artist	Title	Reached number one	Weeks at number one	Ref.
1	Green Day	"Know Your Enemy"	June 20, 2009	1	
2	Linkin Park	"New Divide"	June 27, 2009	12	
3	Alice in Chains	"Check My Brain"	September 19, 2009	8	
4	Foo Fighters	"Wheels"	November 14, 2009	2	
5	Breaking Benjamin	"I Will Not Bow"	November 28, 2009	2	
6	Three Days Grace	"Break"	December 12, 2009	12	
7	Alice in Chains	"Your Decision"	March 6, 2010	6	
8	Stone Temple Pilots	"Between the Lines"	April 17, 2010	7	
9	Three Days Grace	"The Good Life"	June 5, 2010	6	
10	Shinedown	"The Crow & the Butterfly"	July 17, 2010	1	
11	The Dirty Heads featuring Rome Ramirez	"Lay Me Down"	July 24, 2010	1	
re	Shinedown	"The Crow & the Butterfly"	July 31, 2010	3	
12	Linkin Park	"The Catalyst"	August 21, 2010	5	
13	Disturbed	"Another Way to Die"	September 25, 2010	1	
14	Stone Sour	"Say You'll Haunt Me"	October 2, 2010	8	
15	The Black Keys	"Tighten Up"	November 27, 2010	2	
re	Stone Sour	"Say You'll Haunt Me"	December 11, 2010	1	
re	The Black Keys	"Tighten Up"	December 18, 2010	10	
16	Cage the Elephant	"Shake Me Down"	February 26, 2011	2	
17	Foo Fighters	"Rope"†	March 12, 2011	20	
18	Foo Fighters	"Walk"	July 30, 2011	1	
19	Red Hot Chili Peppers	"The Adventures of Rain Dance Maggie"	August 6, 2011	8	
re	Foo Fighters	"Walk"	October 1, 2011	7	
20	Bush	"The Sound of Winter"	November 19, 2011	5	
21	The Black Keys	"Lonely Boy"†	December 24, 2011	14	
22	Gotye featuring Kimbra	"Somebody That I Used to Know"	March 31, 2012	4	
23	Fun featuring Janelle Monáe	"We Are Young"	April 28, 2012	1	
re	Gotye featuring Kimbra	"Somebody That I Used to Know"	May 5, 2012	3	
24	Linkin Park	"Burn It Down"	May 26, 2012	10	
25	Green Day	"Oh Love"	August 4, 2012	1	
re	Linkin Park	"Burn It Down"	August 11, 2012	1	
re	Green Day	"Oh Love"	August 18, 2012	6	
26	The Lumineers	"Ho Hey"	September 29, 2012	2	
27	Mumford and Sons	"I Will Wait"	October 13, 2012	1	
28	Fun	"Some Nights"	October 20, 2012	8	
re	The Lumineers	"Ho Hey"	December 15, 2012	16	
29	Imagine Dragons	"Radioactive"†	April 6, 2013	23	
30	Lorde	"Royals"	September 14, 2013	19	
31	Passenger	"Let Her Go"	January 25, 2014	5	
32	Bastille	"Pompeii"†	March 1, 2014	12	
33	Paramore	"Ain't It Fun"	May 24, 2014	1	
34	Coldplay	"A Sky Full of Stars"	May 31, 2014	1	
re	Paramore	"Ain't It Fun"	June 7, 2014	10	
re	Coldplay	"A Sky Full of Stars"	August 16, 2014	2	
35	Tove Lo	"Habits"	August 30, 2014	6	
re	Coldplay	"A Sky Full of Stars"	October 11, 2014	3	
36	Hozier	"Take Me to Church"	November 1, 2014	23	
37	Walk the Moon	"Shut Up and Dance"†	April 11, 2015	27	
38	X Ambassadors	"Renegades"	October 17, 2015	2	
39	Elle King	"Ex's & Oh's"	October 31, 2015	10	
40	Twenty One Pilots	"Stressed Out"†	January 9, 2016	18	
41	Prince	"Purple Rain"	May 14, 2016	1	
re	Twenty One Pilots	"Stressed Out"†	May 21, 2016	5	
42	Twenty One Pilots	"Ride"	June 25, 2016	9	
43	Twenty One Pilots	"Heathens"	August 27, 2016	30	
44	Imagine Dragons	"Believer"†	March 25, 2017	29	
45	Portugal. The Man	"Feel It Still"	October 14, 2017	5	
46	Imagine Dragons	"Thunder"†	November 18, 2017	21	
47	Imagine Dragons	"Whatever It Takes"	April 3, 2018	17	
re	Imagine Dragons	"Thunder"	July 31, 2018	3	
48	Imagine Dragons	"Natural"	August 21, 2018	11	
49	Panic! at the Disco	"High Hopes"†	November 10, 2018	34	
50	Panic! at the Disco	"Hey Look Ma, I Made It"	July 6, 2019	11	
re	Panic! at the Disco	"High Hopes"†	September 21, 2019	31	
51	Twenty One Pilots	"Level of Concern"	April 25, 2020	7	
52	Powfu featuring Beabadoobee	"Death Bed"	June 13, 2020	6	
53	Juice Wrld and Marshmello	"Come & Go"	July 25, 2020	2	
54	Taylor Swift	"Cardigan"	August 8, 2020	1	
55	Billie Eilish	"My Future"	August 15, 2020	1	
re	Juice Wrld and Marshmello	"Come & Go"	August 22, 2020	2	
56	24kGoldn featuring Iann Dior	"Mood"†	September 5, 2020	16	
57	Taylor Swift	"Willow"	December 26, 2020	1	
re	24kGoldn featuring Iann Dior	"Mood"†	January 2, 2021	19	
58	The Kid Laroi	"Without You"	May 15, 2021	3	
59	Olivia Rodrigo	"Brutal"	June 5, 2021	1	
re	The Kid Laroi	"Without You"	June 12, 2021	9	
60	Billie Eilish	"Happier Than Ever"	August 14, 2021	4	
61	Glass Animals	"Heat Waves" †	September 11, 2021	4	
62	Coldplay and BTS	"My Universe"	October 9, 2021	2	
re	Glass Animals	"Heat Waves" †	October 23, 2021	1	
re	Coldplay and BTS	"My Universe"	October 30, 2021	1	
re	Glass Animals	"Heat Waves" †	November 6, 2021	32	
63	Kate Bush	"Running Up That Hill (A Deal With God)"	June 18, 2022	11	
64	Steve Lacy	"Bad Habit"	September 3, 2022	22	
65	Zach Bryan	"Something in the Orange" †	February 4, 2023	6	
66	Stephen Sanchez	"Until I Found You"	March 18, 2023	3	
re	Zach Bryan	"Something in the Orange" †	April 8, 2023	14	
67	Jelly Roll	"Need a Favor"	July 15, 2023	4	
68	Billie Eilish	"What Was I Made For?"	August 12, 2023	2	
69	Olivia Rodrigo	"Bad Idea Right?"	August 26, 2023	1	
re	Jelly Roll	"Need a Favor"	September 2, 2023	1	
70	Zach Bryan featuring Kacey Musgraves	"I Remember Everything" †	September 9, 2023	30	
71	Hozier	"Too Sweet"	April 6, 2024	8	
72	Billie Eilish	"Lunch"	June 1, 2024	1	
73	Zach Bryan	"Pink Skies"	June 8, 2024	1	
re	Hozier	"Too Sweet"	June 15, 2024	9	
74	Billie Eilish	"Birds of a Feather" †	August 17, 2024	55	
75	Sombr	"Undressed"	September 6, 2025	6	
76	Sombr	"Back to Friends"	October 18, 2025	13	
77	Djo	"End of Beginning"	January 17, 2026	2	
re	Sombr	"Back to Friends"	January 31, 2026	2	
78	Noah Kahan	"The Great Divide"	February 14, 2026	1	
re	Sombr	"Back to Friends"	February 21, 2026	10	
79	Tame Impala and Jennie	"Dracula (Jennie remix)"	May 2, 2026	1	
80	Noah Kahan	"Doors"	May 9, 2026	1	
re	Tame Impala and Jennie	"Dracula (Jennie remix)"	May 16, 2026	3	
81	Olivia Rodrigo	"The Cure"	June 6, 2026	1	
re	Tame Impala and Jennie	"Dracula (Jennie remix)"	June 13, 2026	2	
re	Olivia Rodrigo	"The Cure"	June 27, 2026	1	
re	Tame Impala and Jennie	"Dracula (Jennie remix)"	July 4, 2026	17	
82	Olivia Rodrigo featuring Chappell Roan	"Expectations"	October 31, 2026	1	
re	Tame Impala and Jennie	"Dracula (Jennie remix)"	November 7, 2026	3	

== Statistics ==
=== By artist ===
Artists by most number-one songs
Artist	Number-one songs	Ref.
Imagine Dragons	5	
Billie Eilish	5	
Twenty One Pilots	4	
Olivia Rodrigo	4	
Foo Fighters	3	
Linkin Park	3	
Zach Bryan	3	

Artists by most weeks at number one
Artist	Weeks at number-one	Ref.
Imagine Dragons	104	
Panic! at the Disco	76	
Twenty One Pilots	71	
Billie Eilish	63	
Zach Bryan	51	

=== Songs by total number of weeks at number one ===
Number-one songs by amount of time spent at number one
Song	Weeks at number-one	Ref.
"High Hopes"	65	
"Birds of a Feather"	55	
"Heat Waves"	37	
"Mood"	35	
"Heathens"	30	
"I Remember Everything"	30	
