= List of rock genres =

This is a list of rock music genres consisting of subgenres of popular music that have roots in 1940s and 1950s rock and roll, and which developed into a distinct identity as rock music in the 1960s, particularly in the United States and United Kingdom. By the late 1960s, a number of identifiable rock music subgenres had emerged, including hybrids like blues rock, folk rock, country rock, and jazz-rock fusion, many of which contributed to the development of psychedelic rock influenced by the counter-cultural psychedelic scene. New genres that emerged from this scene included progressive rock, which extended the artistic elements; glam rock, which highlighted showmanship and visual style; and the diverse and enduring major subgenre of heavy metal, which emphasized volume, power, and speed. In the second half of the 1970s, punk rock both intensified and reacted against some of these trends to produce a raw, energetic form of music characterized by overt political and social critiques. Punk was an influence into the 1980s on the subsequent development of other subgenres, including new wave, post-punk and eventually the alternative rock movement. From the 1990s alternative rock began to dominate rock music and break through into the mainstream in the form of grunge, Britpop, and indie rock. Further fusion subgenres have since emerged as well as conscious attempts to revisit rock's history.

== A ==
- Acid rock
- Active rock
- Adult album alternative
- Afro-punk
- Afro rock
- Album-oriented rock
- Alternative country
- Alternative dance
- Alternative hip-hop
- Alternative metal
- Alternative pop
- Alternative R&B
- Alternative reggaeton
- Alternative rock
- Anarcho-punk
- Anatolian rock
- Anti-folk
- Arena rock
- Art punk
- Art rock
- Avant-funk
- Avant-garde metal

== B ==
- Baroque pop
- Baggy
- Bakersfield sound
- Bandana thrash
- Bardcore
- Beatdown hardcore
- Beat music
- Big-beat
- Biker metal
- Blackgaze
- Blackened death metal
- Black metal
- Blog rock
- Blues rock
- Blue-eyed soul
- Boogie rock
- Brill Building pop
- British folk rock
- British Invasion
- British rock and roll
- Britpop
- Bro-country
- Brutal death metal
- Bubblegrunge

== C ==
- Canterbury sound
- Cello rock
- Celtic metal
- Celtic punk
- Celtic rock
- Chamber pop
- Chicano rock
- Christian alternative rock
- Christian death metal
- Christian hardcore
- Christian metal
- Christian punk
- Christian rock
- Christian ska
- Classic alternative
- Classic rock
- Cock rock
- Coldwave
- College rock
- Comedy rock
- Country rock
- Cowpunk
- Crank wave
- Crunkcore
- Crossover thrash
- Crust punk

== D ==
- Dance-punk
- Dance-rock
- Dark cabaret
- Darkwave
- D-beat
- Death 'n' roll
- Deathcore
- Death-doom
- Deathgrind
- Death metal
- Deathrock
- Desert blues
- Digital hardcore
- Djent
- Doom metal
- Dream pop
- Drone metal
- Dunedin sound
- Dungeon synth

== E ==
- Egg punk
- Electric blues
- Electroclash
- Electronicore
- Electronic rock
- Emo
- Emo pop
- Emo rap
- Emo revival
- Ethereal wave
- Experimental rock
- Extreme metal

== F ==
- Flamenco rock
- Folk metal
- Folk punk
- Folk rock
- Foxcore
- Freakbeat
- Funeral doom
- Funk metal
- Funk rock

== G ==
- Garage punk
- Garage rock
- Geek rock
- Glam metal
- Glam punk
- Glam rock
- Goregrind
- Gothabilly
- Gothic country
- Gothic metal
- Gothic rock
- Grebo
- Grindcore
- Grindie
- Groove metal
- Group Sounds
- Grunge
- Grungegaze
- Gypsy punk

== H ==
- Hard rock
- Hardcore punk
- Heartland rock
- Heavy metal
- Horror punk

== I ==
- Incelcore
- Indie folk
- Indie pop
- Indie rock
- Indorock
- Industrial hip hop
- Industrial metal
- Industrial rock
- Instrumental rock
- Iranian alternative rock
- Iranian rock
- Italian beat
- Italian occult psychedelia

== J ==
- Jangle pop
- Jam rock
- Jazz fusion

== K ==
- Kawaii metal
- Kindie rock
- Könsrock
- Kosmische Musik
- Krautrock
- Krishnacore

== L ==
- Landfill indie
- Latin alternative
- Latin metal
- Latin rock
- Latino punk
- Lounge rock

== M ==
- Madchester
- Mainstream rock
- Mathcore
- Math rock
- Medieval folk rock
- Medieval metal
- Melodic death metal
- Melodic hardcore
- Melodic metalcore
- Midwest emo
- Minimal wave
- Minneapolis sound
- Metalcore
- Mod revival
- Modern rock
- Motorik

== N ==
- Nagoya kei
- Nazi punk
- Nederbeat
- Nederpop
- Neue Deutsche Härte
- Neoclassical metal
- Neo-prog
- Neo-psychedelia
- New musick
- New rave
- New wave
- New wave of American heavy metal
- New wave of British heavy metal
- New wave of traditional heavy metal
- New wave of classic rock
- New York hardcore
- Nintendocore
- Noisecore
- Noise pop
- Noise rock
- No wave
- Nu gaze
- Nu metal
- Nu metalcore

== O ==
- Occult rock
- Oi!
- Outlaw country

== P ==
- Pagan metal
- Pagan rock
- Paisley Underground
- Palm Desert Scene
- Pirate metal
- Pop metal
- Pop punk
- Pop rock
- Pop screamo
- Pornogrind
- Positive hardcore
- Post-Britpop
- Post-grunge
- Post-hardcore
- Post-metal
- Post-progressive
- Post-punk
- Post-punk revival
- Post-rock
- Power pop
- Power metal
- Powerviolence
- Progressive country
- Progressive folk
- Progressive metal
- Progressive metalcore
- Progressive pop
- Progressive rap
- Progressive rock
- Progressive soul
- Proto-metal
- Proto-prog
- Proto-punk
- Psychedelic folk
- Psychedelic funk
- Psychedelic pop
- Psychedelic rap
- Psychedelic rock
- Psychedelic soul
- Psychobilly
- Pub rock (Australia)
- Pub rock (United Kingdom)
- Punk blues
- Punk funk
- Punk jazz
- Punk rap
- Punk rock
- Punk pathetique
- Punta rock

== Q ==
- Queercore

== R ==
- Raga rock
- Rap metal
- Rap rock
- Reggae punk
- Reggae rock
- Red dirt
- Riot grrrl
- Risecore
- Rock Against Communism
- Rock and roll
- Rock en español
- Rock kapak
- Rockabilly
- Rock in Opposition
- Roots rock

== S ==
- Sass
- Samba rock
- Scottish Gaelic punk
- Screamo
- Shaman punk
- Shitgaze
- Shoegaze
- Shock rock
- Ska punk
- Skate punk
- Slacker rock
- Slowcore
- Sludge metal
- Soft grunge
- Soft rock
- Sophisti-pop
- SoundCloud indie
- Southern rock
- Space rock
- Speed metal
- Stoner rock
- Street punk
- Sufi rock
- Sunshine pop
- Surf rock
- Swamp rock
- Symphonic black metal
- Symphonic death metal
- Symphonic metal
- Synth-pop

== T ==
- Tango-rock
- Taqwacore
- Technical death metal
- Thrashcore
- Thrash metal
- Time Lord rock
- Tough guy hardcore
- Trallpunk
- Trip hop
- Trønder rock
- Tropicália
- Tropical rock
- Tulsa Sound
- Twee pop
- 2 Tone

== U ==
- Unblack metal

== V ==
- Viking metal
- Viking rock
- Visual kei

== W ==
- Wagnerian rock
- War metal
- Washington, D.C., hardcore
- Wizard rock
- Wong shadow
- Worldbeat

== Y ==
- Yacht rock
- Youth crew

== Z ==
- Zamrock
- Zeuhl
- Zoomergaze

== See also ==
- Electronics in rock music
- Rock festival
- List of subcultures
- List of heavy metal genres
- List of punk rock genres
- List of hardcore punk genres
- Lists of music genres
