= Microgenre =

Specialized or niche genre

A microgenre is a specialized or niche genre, often used to describe narrowly defined subcategories within music, literature, film, or art. The term has been in use since at least the 1970s, particularly in the context of music, where it refers to specific stylistic offshoots of prominent genres, such as the many sub-subgenres of heavy metal and electronic music.

Originally, microgenres were labels retroactively applied by record collectors and dealers, often to increase the perceived value of rare or obscure recordings. Early examples include Northern soul, freakbeat, garage punk, and sunshine pop.

By the late 2000s and early 2010s, the creation and dissemination of microgenres had become increasingly associated with internet culture, where online platforms facilitated their rapid emergence, which was often tied to internet aesthetics and online trends. Notable Internet music-based microgenres include chillwave, witch house, seapunk, shitgaze, dreampunk, and vaporwave.

== Etymology and definition ==
The term "microgenre" was originally coined in a 1975 French article about historical fiction, alongside "macrogenre".The author defined microgenres as "a narrowly defined group of texts connected in time and space", whereas macrogenres are "more diffuse and harder to generalize about." Further discussion of the microgenre concept appeared in various critical works of 1980s and 1990s.

== History in music ==
=== 1960s–1990s: Origins ===
Historically, musical microgenres were usually labelled by writers seeking to define a new style by linking together a group of seemingly disparate artists. The process of recognition for "garage rock" and "power pop" was similarly formulated by a circle of rock writers who advocated their own annotated history of the genre. Music journalist Simon Reynolds has suggested that early examples of "genre-as-retroactive-fiction" include "Northern soul" and "garage punk", both of which were coined in the early 1970s, but did not become widespread until years after the fact. These genres were later followed by "freakbeat" coined by Phil Smee in the 1980s, as well as "sunshine pop" which was coined in the 1990s.

According to Reynolds, such "semi-invented" genres were sometimes pushed by record dealers and collectors to increase the monetary value of the original records. In the early 1980s, Robert Christgau coined the term "pigfuck" to describe the music of Sonic Youth, the term later took a life of its own to denote a specific style of noise rock music.

Successful attempts that resulted in widespread usage include "post-rock" (Reynolds) and "hauntology" (Mark Fisher). In the mid 1990s, Melody Maker journalists went so far as to make up fictional bands to justify the existence of an updated New Romantic scene they dubbed "Romantic Modernism". That same decade, there was a trend of electronic and dance music producers who created specialized descriptions of their music as a way to assert their individuality. In the instance of trance music, this desire led to progressive trance, Goa trance, deep psytrance, and hard trance. House, drum-n-bass, dubstep and techno also contain a large number of microgenres.

=== 21st century ===
In the early 2000s, the concept of microgenres gained prominence during the digital age, proliferating through the early blogosphere, and despite its earlier history, is more often associated with these later trends. The speed at which microgenres achieve recognition and familiarity also accelerated substantially. This 21st-century "microgenre explosion" was partly a consequence of "software advances, faster internet connections, and the globalized proliferation of music."

In 2009, a writer for the New York Times observed that indie rock was then evolving into "an ever-expanding, incomprehensibly cluttered taxonomy of subgenres." By the early 2010s, most microgenres were linked and defined through various outlets on the internet. Each of them, according to Vice writer Ezra Marcus, were "music scenes [created] out of thin air". Pitchfork's Jonny Coleman commented: "The line between a real genre that sounds fake and a fake genre that could be real is as thin as ever, if existent at all. This is the uncanny genre valley that publicists-cum-neologicians live in and for."

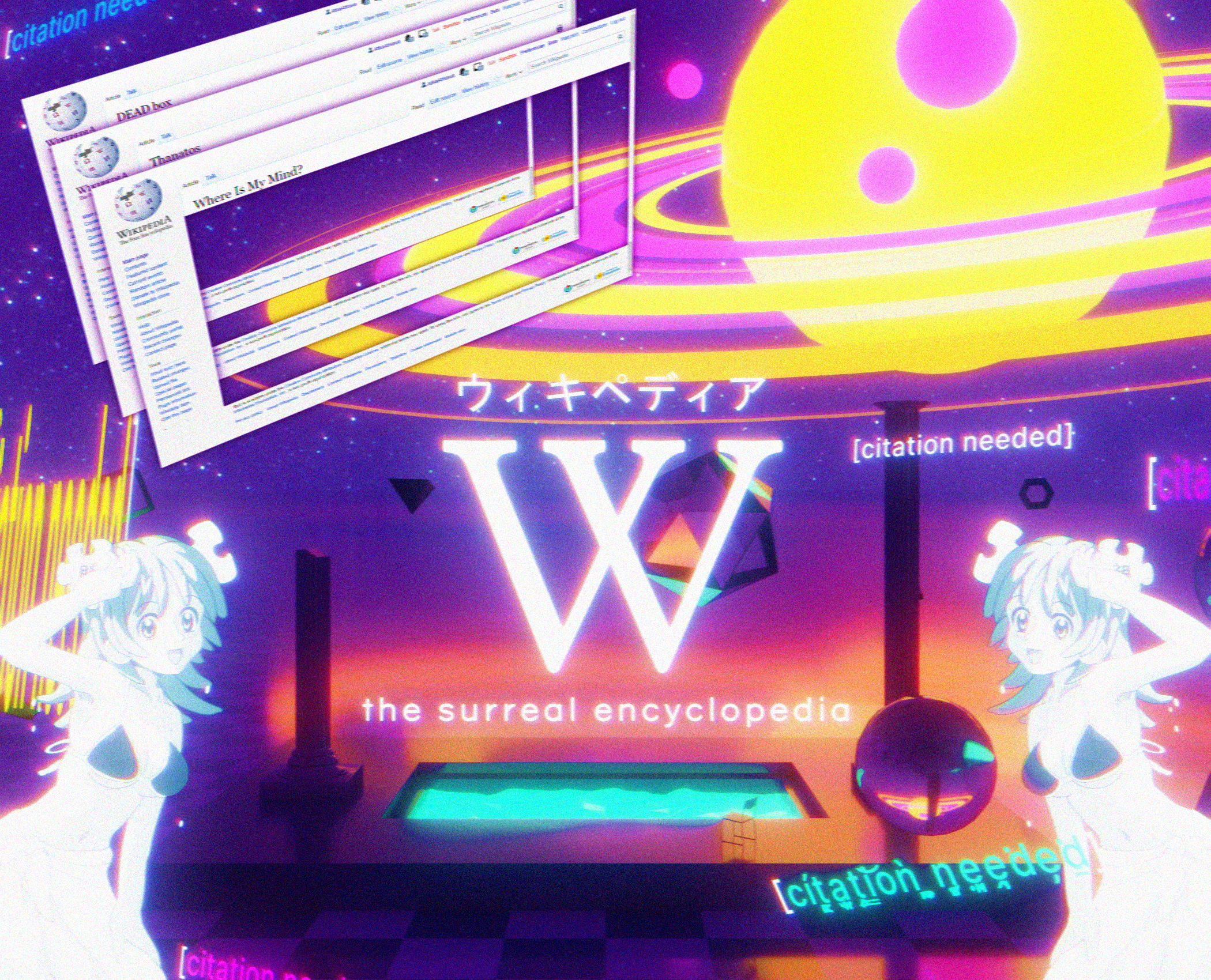
Vaporwave is one of the most prominent Internet-centric microgenres and subcultures that emerged in the 2010s.

Although, shitgaze, and blog era music genres like bloghouse, blog rap and blog rock predated it, "chillwave", coined by the ironic music blog Hipster Runoff around 2009 as an internet meme was one of the first music genres to develop primarily online. The term did not gain mainstream currency until early 2010, when it was the subject of articles by the Wall Street Journal and the New York Times. Writing in 2019, journalist Emilie Friedlander, called chillwave "the internet electronic micro-genre that launched a hundred internet electronic micro-genres (think: vaporwave, witch house, seapunk, shitgaze, distroid, hard vapor), not to mention its corollaries in this decade's internet rap, which largely shared its collagist, hyper-referential approach to sound."

In 2013, Glenn McDonald, who originally worked at the music intelligence firm the Echo Nest, which was later bought by music streaming company Spotify, developed genre mapping data that later became built into various Spotify features, including its "Daily Mix" and "Fans also like" recommendation functions. Additionally, he created the Every Noise at Once website which focused on documenting and categorizing internet-based music microgenres. In August 2019, the use of his metadata in the Spotify algorithm contributed to the curation of the "Hyperpop" Spotify playlist, led by Lizzie Szabo, which helped popularize the movement, as McDonald had previously added the term "hyperpop" to the platform's algorithm which drew from Every Noise at Once, in 2018.

== Criticism ==
In 2010, The Atlantic's Llewellyn Hinkes Johns referenced the succession of chillwave, glo-fi, and hypnagogic pop as a "prime example" of a cycle involving the invention of a new category that is quickly and "brazenly denounced, sometimes in the same article". Grantland's Dave Schilling describes the "chillwave" designation as a pivotal moment that "revealed how arbitrary and meaningless labels like that really are. It wasn't a scene. It was a parody of a scene, both a defining moment for the music blogosphere and the last gasp." PopMatters' Thomas Britt argued that the "staggering number of niches created by writers and commenters to 'distinguish' musical acts is ultimately binding. If a band plays along and tailors itself to a category, then its fortunes are likely tied to the shelf life of that category."

== Other fields ==
In the 21st century, digital publishing has enabled increasingly niche microgenres in literature, such as Amish romance and NASCAR passion.

In 2006, Netflix developed an approach for labeling various aspects of films and TV shows, and from that data identified 76,897 "altgenres" to use in its recommendation algorithm.

== See also ==
- List of microgenres
- Internet aesthetics
- Post-Internet (music)
- Internet music
- 21st century music
- -core
- Heavy metal genres
- Punk rock genres
  - Hardcore punk subgenres
- Industrial music genres
- "Writing about music is like dancing about architecture"
