= Noise rock =

Experimental rock music mixed with noise

- Stylistic origins: Experimental rock; punk rock; noise; minimal; garage rock; krautrock; acid rock; industrial; post-punk; hardcore punk
- Cultural origins: c. Mid-1960s to 1980s, New York City, United States
- Derivative forms: Grunge; post-hardcore; industrial rock; math rock; mathcore; noise pop

Subgenres
- Pigfuck; shitgaze

Fusion genres
- Noisecore; noisegrind

Local scenes
- No wave

Other topics
- Alternative rock; avant-punk; grindcore; post-rock

Noise rock is a subgenre of rock music that originally emerged in the late 1970s and early 1980s. Artists fuse rock music to noise, while utilizing extreme levels of guitar distortion and feedback, primarily through the use of electric guitars.

== Etymology ==
The term "noise rock" refers to "noise" and "rock" music. The earliest known print use of the term was on April 25, 1970, in an issue of Record World by writer John Kornblum, who used the phrase "psychedelic-noise-rock". On July 22, 1972, writer Nat Freedland published an article in Billboard magazine which outlined the influence of Germany's krautrock scene on English rock bands. He concluded by asking, "Is America the next step for teutonic noise rock?" In the late 1980s, music critic Robert Christgau coined the term "pigfuck", which writer JR Moores noted had been a synonym for noise rock. Though the term has been described as its own musical subgenre.

== Characteristics ==
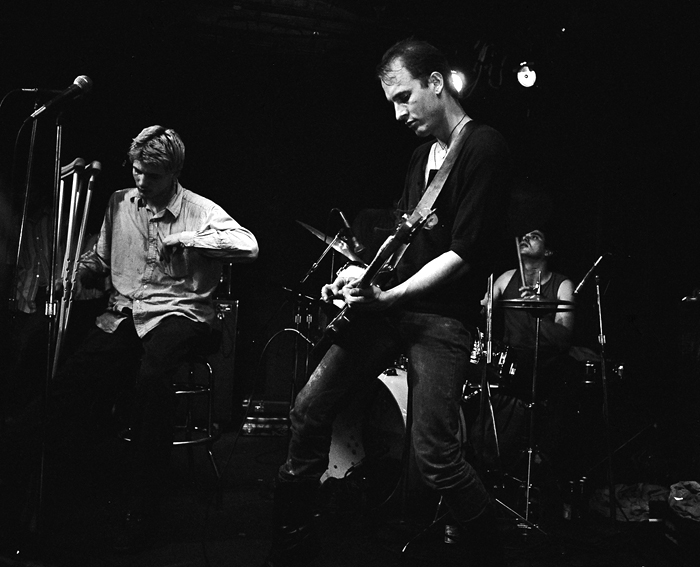
Flipper at the 9:30 Club, Washington, D.C., 1984

Noise rock is a term that can refer to two distinct styles, each stemming from different influences and stylistic origins. In the late 1980s, music critic Robert Christgau coined the term "pigfuck" to describe Sonic Youth, the label later took a life of its own encompassing artists like Big Black, the Jesus Lizard, Flipper, Cows, Scratch Acid and No Trend who were more rooted in the post-hardcore and post-punk scenes and often associated with labels like Amphetamine Reptile and Touch and Go. The other strain of the genre originated in the late 1960s with more art-based influences, aligning itself with avant-garde music and psychedelic rock, pioneered by bands like the Velvet Underground, Red Krayola, Les Rallizes Dénudés and later Fushitsusha and Boredoms. Bands like Sonic Youth incorporated both the genre's punk rooted origins as well as its art-damaged sound, by including the use of alternate tunings and unconventional prepared guitar techniques, such as playing guitar with drumsticks.

Sonic Youth are the only noise rock band to achieve commercial success with the single "100%" from their album "Dirty" reaching #4 on the US charts with frontman Thurston Moore stating:

Noise has taken the place of punk rock. People who play noise have no real aspirations to being part of the mainstream culture. Punk has been co-opted, and this subterranean noise music and the avant-garde folk scene have replaced it.

Additionally, the no wave scene helped further develop the sound of noise rock, with the compilation album "No New York" serving as a pivotal influence. Subsequently, bands like Sonic Youth and Swans, emerged out of the scene as key noise rock artists, drawing inspiration from no wave composers Glenn Branca and Rhys Chatham.

Noise rock fuses rock to noise, merging extreme levels of guitar distortion, electronic effects, atonality, improvisation, and white noise with that of traditional rock music instrumentation.

While noise rock has never had any wide mainstream popularity, the raw, distorted and feedback-intensive sound of some noise rock bands had an influence on shoegaze, which enjoyed some popularity in the 90s, especially in the UK, and grunge, the most commercially successful with Nirvana's final studio album In Utero produced by Steve Albini and generally taking influences from bands like Big Black, Wipers, the Pixies, Dinosaur Jr. and the Jesus Lizard. The Butthole Surfers' mix of punk, heavy metal and noise rock was a major influence, particularly on the early work of Soundgarden. Other influential acts were Wisconsin's Killdozer, Chicago's Big Black, and San Francisco's Flipper.

== History ==
=== Forerunners ===
During the mid-to late 1960s, the use of guitar feedback and distortion in rock music was becoming further incorporated by garage and acid rock bands, with its predominance being primarily pioneered by artists such as the Who, the Yardbirds, the Monks, Frank Zappa, Pink Floyd, the Velvet Underground, Jimi Hendrix and the Grateful Dead whose guitar playing and techniques were beginning to border on "noise". On April 25, 1970, writer John Kornblum in an issue of Record World, stated:

In the waning days of the San Francisco rock scene not everybody who remained after the "flower people" fled were into shooting speed and watching teeny acid freaks. Friends still into making music began to realize it was about time to move on and get as far away from what had become super-commercialized psychedelic-noise-rock.

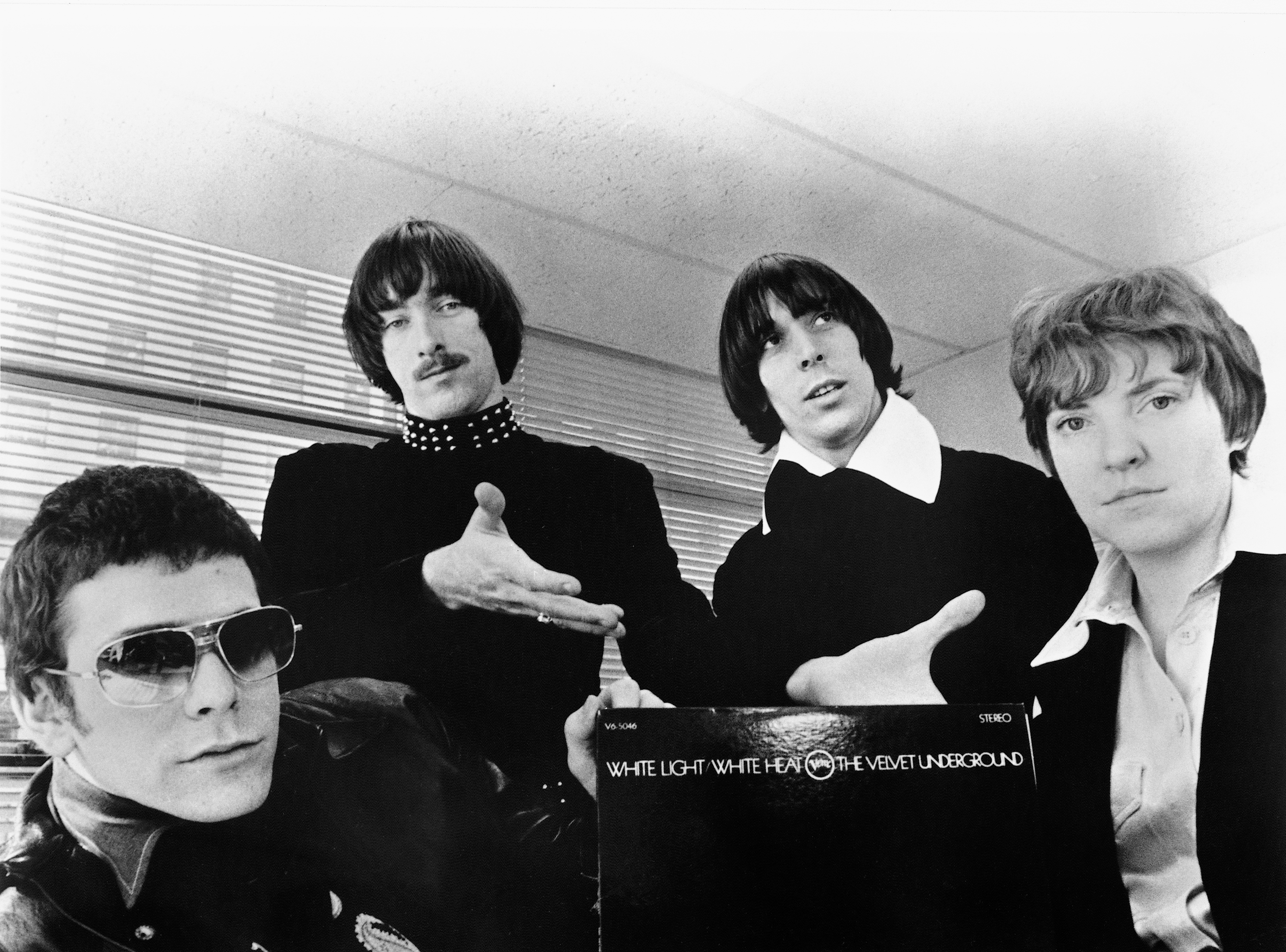
A publicity photo of the Velvet Underground holding a copy of White Light/White Heat c. 1968.

In 1968, the Velvet Underground released White Light/White Heat, which was later widely recognized as the first noise rock album, with Spin magazine deeming it the genre's "ur-text". Guitarist Lou Reed drew influence from free jazz saxophonist Ornette Coleman, incorporating feedback as well as a discordant atonal approach to electric guitar, which was expanded upon from their previous release The Velvet Underground & Nico.

Although, some contemporaneous underground experimental and psychedelic rock groups were later recognized by music critics as early pioneers of what would become noise rock such as Red Krayola, Michael Yonkers, Cromagnon, Pärson Sound, the Godz, the Ethix, the Sperm and Nihilist Spasm Band. Most notable of these artists would be Les Rallizes Denudés, formed in Kyoto, Japan in 1967, who drew inspiration from the Velvet Underground's White Light/White Heat, and later influenced several artists in the early Japanese noise and acid rock scene.

Additionally, U.S. experimental music groups would also prove influential, such as the Residents who released a noisy version of "Satisfaction" in 1976, and Half Japanese, whose 1977 EP Calling All Girls later influenced Sonic Youth and Kurt Cobain.

=== 1970s–1980s: Origins ===
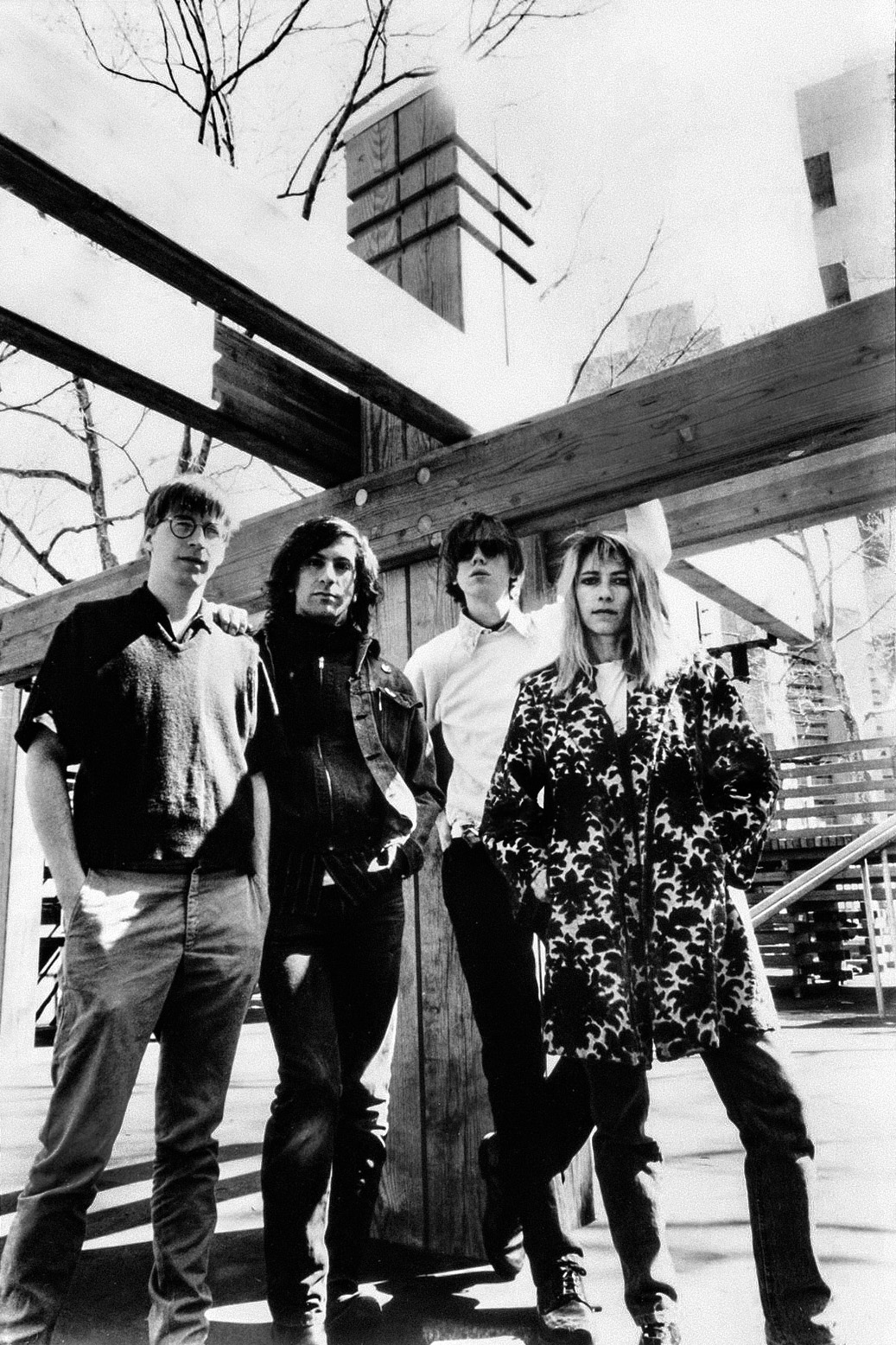
Sonic Youth in a publicity photo issued by SST to promote their fourth album, Sister (1987). Left to right: Shelley, Ranaldo, Moore, Gordon

During the late 1970s to early 1980s, the term "noise rock" became associated with an offshoot of punk groups that showcased an increasingly abrasive approach which merged extreme levels of atonality, distortion, and guitar feedback with traditional rock music instrumentation. The advent of punk rock and post-punk, inspired bands in adopting a more abrasive approach to rock music, some of these early artists included San Francisco's influential acid-punk band Chrome, as well as art-punk group MX-80 Sound who influenced Steve Albini and Sonic Youth. However, most notable of these artists were Nick Cave's the Birthday Party, who, inspired by the Pop Group, went on to influence "a generation of US noise-rock groups, from Sonic Youth to Big Black and the Jesus Lizard". Other influences include This Heat, Swell Maps, Wire, the Fall and Pere Ubu. In addition, "Weird Noise E.P." the British DIY punk various artists 7" single released in 1979 was the earliest noise rock compilation album.

Guitarist Steve Albini of noise rock band Big Black stated in 1984 in an article that "good noise is like orgasm". He commented: "Anybody can play notes. There's no trick. What is a trick and a good one is to make a guitar do things that don't sound like a guitar at all. The point here is stretching the boundaries." He said that Ron Asheton of the Stooges "made squealy death noise feedback" on "Iggy's monstruous songs". Albini also mentioned John McKay of Siouxsie and the Banshees, saying: "The Scream (1978) is notable for a couple of things: only now people are trying to copy it, and even now nobody understands how that guitar player got all that pointless noise to stick together as songs". Albini also said that Keith Levene of Public Image Ltd had this "ability to make an excruciating noise come out of his guitar". Additionally, Andy Gill of Gang of Four would incorporate drawn-out abrasive guitar feedback on their song "Love Like Anthrax".

In an article about noise rock, Spin wrote that the US compilation album No New York, produced by Brian Eno and released in 1978 was an important document of the late '70s New York no wave scene that acted as an influence to bands like Sonic Youth and Swans. It featured several songs of Lydia Lunch's first band Teenage Jesus and the Jerks along with material of other groups Mars, DNA and James Chance and the Contortions, other bands who were not featured on the compilation such as Theoretical Girls, Suicide, the Notekillers, Red Transistor, the Static and Jack Ruby were also influential to the scene.

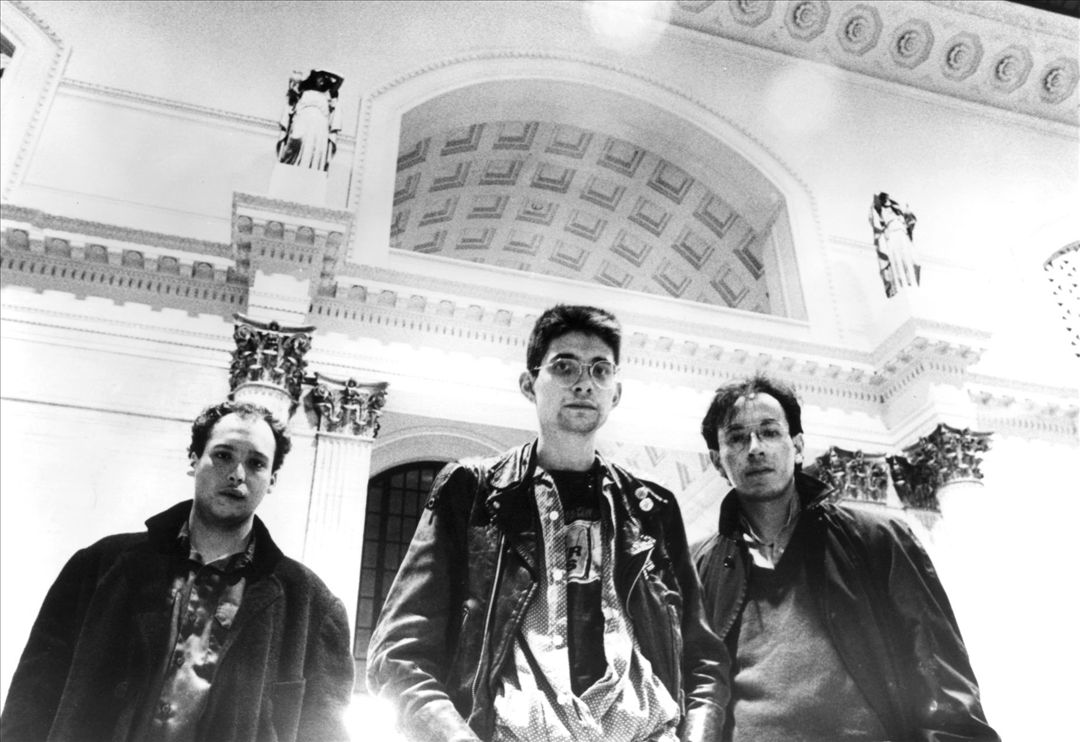
Big Black at Chicago's Union Station in 1986; left to right: Riley, Albini, and Durango

During the 1980s, Big Black, Sonic Youth and Swans were the leading figures of noise rock with Sonic Youth becoming the first noise rock band to get signed by a major label in 1990. Subsequently, Robert Chrisgau would coin the term "pigfuck" which later became associated with many of the prominent noise rock bands during this period. Other influential groups were Scratch Acid, Oxbow, Barkmarket, Pussy Galore, the Dead C and No Trend. Noise rock bands like Ruins and Bitch Magnet began drawing influences from math rock. Subsequently, Japan would also contribute with influential bands such as High Rise, Boredoms, Zeni Geva and Mainliner. Later notable bands of the noise rock scene included Cows, Brainbombs, Steve Albini's Rapeman, Season to Risk and Unsane. The Quietus retrospectively described 1986 as one of the most formative years for extreme music genres like noise rock.

=== 1990s–2000s ===
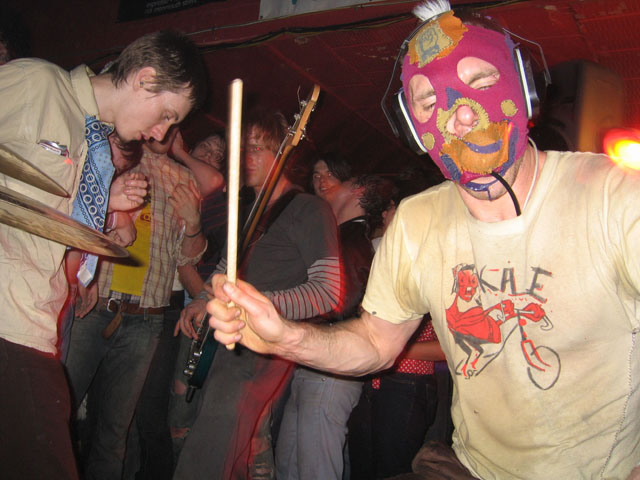
Lightning Bolt Live (2005) at the Southgate House

Subsequently, as genres like post-hardcore developed into the early 1990s, noise rock bands such as Mclusky, U.S. Maple, Polvo, Unwound, Drive Like Jehu, Today Is the Day and Cherubs began further incorporating these influences into the noise rock genre whilst bands like Helmet infused influences indebted to heavy metal, and most notably Brainiac who merged post-hardcore with synth-punk. Steve Albini formed the influential noise rock band Shellac in 1992, further proliferating the genre, while the Jesus Lizard emerged in the early 1990s as a "leading noise rock band" in the American scene with their "willfully abrasive and atonal" style.

Later on in the 1990s, the term "noise punk" began developing with the band Lightning Bolt serving as key players in the 2000s noise punk scene in Providence, Rhode Island centered around the Fort Thunder art music venue, although Brian Gibson, the band's bassist, is dismissive of the noise punk label, stating "I hate, hate, hate the category "noise-punk" I really don't like being labeled with two words that have so much baggage. It's gross." Other noise punk artists include Arab on Radar, Liars, Boris, the Flying Luttenbachers, Zs, Laddio Bolocko, Hella, Royal Trux and Harry Pussy. In Japan, notable noise rock bands began to emerge out of the Japanoise scene, such as Fushitsusha, EX-Girl, Destroy 2 and Space Streakings.

Notable noise rock bands that emerged in the early 2000s were A Place to Bury Strangers, Daughters, Japandroids, METZ, the Goslings and Death from Above 1979. As well as poppier acts such as Pissed Jeans, Dope Body and Karp.

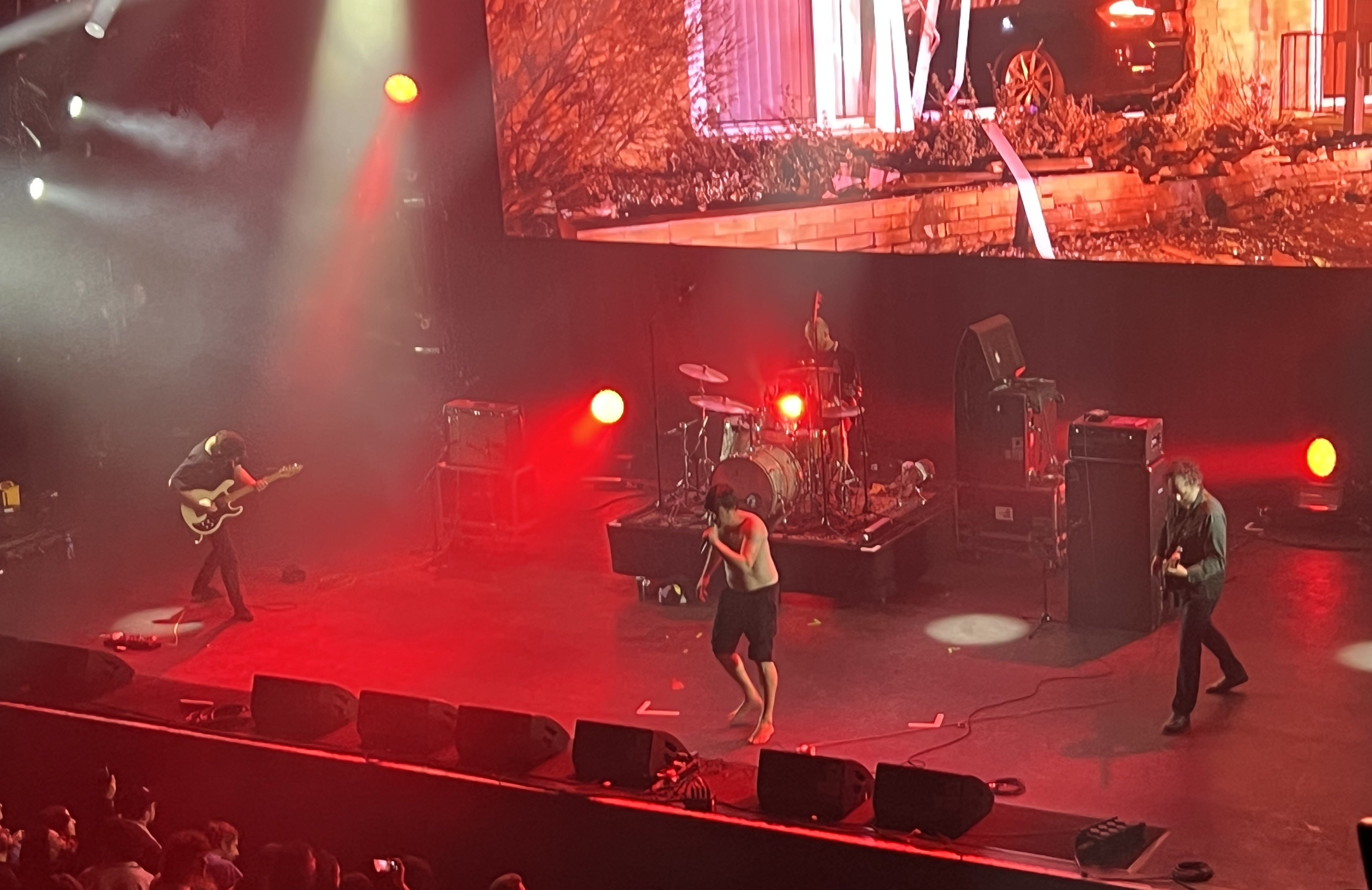
Chat Pile performing at 2023 Roadburn Festival

=== 2010s–2020s ===
During the early 2010s, noise rock artists such as Gilla Band, Whores and Mannequin Pussy emerged onto the scene. London's Windmill scene pioneers Black Midi's debut album was referred to as noise rock by Rolling Stone. In 2018, Daughters released You Won't Get What You Want, which became a critically acclaimed noise rock album.

Subsequently, bands like Sprain and Chat Pile would follow, gaining prominence as noise rock groups.

== Related genres ==
=== Pigfuck ===
Pigfuck is a noise rock subgenre coined by music critic Robert Christgau in 1987, the term was originally used to describe the caustic sounds of emerging noise rock band Sonic Youth (similar to another term he coined "skronk" as a descriptor for jagged and noisy guitar music). Later taking on a life of its own, pigfuck became associated with the sounds of post-hardcore adjacent bands like Big Black, Butthole Surfers, Cows, Scratch Acid, No Trend and Flipper as well as artists on labels such as Touch and Go Records and Amphetamine Reptile Records.

=== Noisecore ===
Noisecore is a subgenre of hardcore punk and noise music which emerged in the mid-1980s. Notable acts include Melt-Banana, Gore Beyond Necropsy, Fat Day and the Gerogerigegege.

=== Shitgaze ===
Shitgaze is an early internet microgenre coined in the early 2000s by the Midwestern rock band Psychedelic Horseshit who pioneered a brand of noise rock they dubbed "shitgaze". Notable acts include the Hospitals, No Age, Times New Viking, early Wavves, Grave Babies, Sic Alps, Vivian Girls, Sealings, early Best Coast, Meth Teeth, Pink Reason, the Bitters, Eat Skull and P.H.F.

== See also ==
- List of noise rock bands
- List of noise musicians

== Bibliography ==
- Blush, Steven (2016). New York Rock: From the Rise of The Velvet Underground to the Fall of CBGB. St. Martin's Press. ISBN 978-1-250-08361-6.
- Felix, Stanford (2010). The Complete Idiot's Guide Music Dictionary. DK Publishing. ISBN 978-1-101-19809-4.
- Hunt, Jeremy (2024). From Chaos to Ambiguity: A Theology of Noise Rock. Pickwick Publications. ISBN 979-8385204014.
