= Present the Paisley Reich =

Studio album by Times New Viking
- Released: February 13, 2007
- Genre: Indie rock, lo-fi
- Label: Siltbreeze

Times New Viking chronology
| Dig Yourself (2005) | Present the Paisley Reich (2007) | Rip It Off (2008) |

Professional ratings
Review scores
| Source | Rating |
|---|---|
| AllMusic | 3.5/5 stars |
| Pitchfork Media | (8.2/10) |
| Tiny Mix Tapes | 4/5 stars |

Present the Paisley Reich is the second album by lo-fi indie rock group Times New Viking. The CD release is expanded to include songs from two seven-inch releases: "Busy Making Love & War" and a split EP with Psychedelic Horseshit. The album was released on Siltbreeze Records.

== Track listing ==
=== Vinyl ===
1. "Imagine Dead John Lennon"
2. "Devo & Wine"
3. "Little Amps"
4. "New Times, New Hope"
5. "Slay Atlantis"
6. "Teenage Lust!"
7. "Ladders"
8. "Love Your Daughters"
9. "Allegory Gets Me Hot"

=== CD ===
1. "Imagine Dead John Lennon"
2. "Devo & Wine"
3. "Little Amps"
4. "New Times, New Hope"
5. "Slay Atlantis"
6. "Teenage Lust!"
7. "Ladders"
8. "Love Your Daughters"
9. "Allegory Gets Me Hot"
10. "+++"
11. "Bad Looks"
12. "Common Cold"
13. "Lover's Lane"
14. "Let Your Hair Grow Long"
15. "Hiding in Machines"
