= List of music microgenres =

This is a list of music microgenres, which are defined as highly specific subgenres of a certain topic.

== Music ==
- Alternative R&B
- Balearic pop
- Baltimore club
- Blackgaze
- Bedroom pop
- Bloghouse
- Brostep
- Bubblegrunge
- Business techno
- Chillwave
- Cloud rap
- Comfy synth
- Complextro
- Country rap
- Crabcore
- Crunk
- Dariacore
- Deconstructed club
- Digicore
- Distroid
- Drill
- Egg punk
- Electroclash
- Electropop
- Fidget house
- Freak folk
- Future bass
- Future funk
- Future garage
- Future house
- Guarachero
- Hardvapour
- HexD
- Hipster hop
- Hyperpop
- Hypnagogic pop
- Incelcore
- J-garage
- Italian dream house
- Jerk
- Lo-fi house
- Lo-fi pop
- Lofi hip-hop
- Minneapolis sound
- Moombahton
- Mumble rap
- New rave
- Nightcore
- Noisecore
- Noisegrind
- Pornogrind
- Robloxcore
- Seapunk
- Shangaan electro
- Sunshine pop
- Shibuya-kei
- Shitgaze
- Sigilkore
- Sinogrime
- Skweee
- Slam death metal
- Slowed and reverb
- Snap
- Synthwave
- Tropical house
- UK funky
- Vaporwave
- Vampjerk
- Weightless
- Witch house
- Wonky

== See also ==
Other music genres

- Avant-prog
- Baroque pop
- Bardcore
- Blog rock
- Brutal prog
- Bubblegum bass
- Cringe pop
- Cuddlecore
- Dream-beat
- Dreampunk
- Folktronica
- Freakbeat
- Future pop
- Garage-psych
- Garage punk
- Gothabilly
- Indietronica
- Indie surf
- Kawaii future bass
- Krushclub
- Landfill indie
- Lowercase
- Minimal wave
- Neon pop-punk
- New Weird America
- New pop
- New wave of new wave
- Nightcore
- Northern soul
- Outsider music
- Pigfuck
- Post-progressive
- Proto-prog
- Proto-punk
- Proto-metal
- Recession pop
- Sophisti-pop
- Synthedelia
- Wonky pop
- Yacht rock
- Zeuhl
