= California Roll =

A California roll is a kind of sushi.

California Roll may also refer to:

== Books ==
- California Roll, a Moses Wine detective novel by Roger L. Simon 1985

== Music ==
- California Roll, jazz album by Osamu Kitajima 1975, reissued CBS 1988
- California Roll, jazz guitar album by Chuei Yoshikawa Voss Records 1987
- "California Roll" (song), song by Snoop Dogg
- "California Roll", by Times New Viking from album Dancer Equired!

== Other ==
- California Roll, vert skating trick by Eito Yasutoko
- California Roll, a nickname given to the practice of performing a "rolling stop" at a stop sign
