= Born Again Revisited =

Studio album by Times New Viking
- Released: U.S: September 22, 2009; U.K: September 21, 2009
- Genre: Alternative rock, lo-fi
- Label: Matador Records

Times New Viking chronology
| Rip It Off (2008) | Born Again Revisited (2009) | Dancer Equired! (2011) |

Professional ratings
Aggregate scores
| Source | Rating |
|---|---|
| Metacritic | 68/100 |
Review scores
| Source | Rating |
| AllMusic | 4/5 stars |
| Chart Attack | 4.5/5 stars |
| Now Magazine | 3/5 stars |
| Pitchfork Media | 8.1/10 |
| Prefix Magazine | 7.5/10 |
| Tiny Mix Tapes | 3.5/5 stars |

Born Again Revisited is the fourth album by Columbus-based trio Times New Viking, and their second release for Matador Records. "No Time, No Hope" was released as a teaser download by Matador in advance of the album's release.

== Track listing ==
1. "Martin Luther King Day" – 2:44
2. "I Smell Bubblegum" – 1:35
3. "City on Drugs" – 1:51
4. "Born Again Revisited" – 1:56
5. "Little World" – 1:36
6. "No Time, No Hope" – 2:51
7. "Half Day in Hell" – 1:24
8. "Something More" – 1:44
9. "2/11 Don't Forget" – 3:47
10. "These Days" – 2:35
11. "(No) Sympathy" – 1:50
12. "High Holidays" – 1:19
13. "Hustler, Psycho, Son" – 2:24
14. "Move to California" – 2:42
15. "Take the Piss" – 0:37
