= Times New Viking =

Indie band

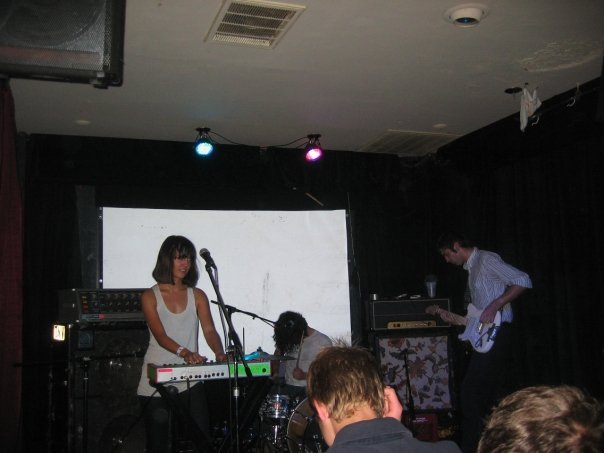
- Performing in 2008

Background information
- Origin: Columbus, Ohio, United States
- Genres: Indie rock; noise pop; slacker rock; shitgaze
- Years active: 2005–2012, 2016, 2026–present
- Labels: Siltbreeze; Matador; Merge (US); Wichita (EU)
- Members: Jared Phillips; Beth Murphy; Adam Elliott

Times New Viking is an American rock band from Columbus, Ohio. Its lineup consisted of Jared Phillips on guitar, Adam Elliott on drums, and Beth Murphy on keyboards. Murphy and Elliott shared vocal duties. The band were associated with the 2000s "shitgaze" scene.

The band's name, "Times New Viking", is a play on the popular typeface Times New Roman. The group released five albums: Dig Yourself (2005), Present the Paisley Reich (2007), Rip It Off (2008), Born Again Revisited (2009), and Dancer Equired! (2011). It also released three EPs — Dead New Viking (2005), Stay Awake (2008), and Over & Over (2012) — and several singles. Rip it Off reached No. 17 on the Billboard Heatseekers chart and NME gave it an 8/10 rating. The band was previously signed to Siltbreeze and Matador Records. Its fifth album was released in April 2011 via Merge in the US, Wichita in Europe, Pop Frenzy in Australia and Big Nothing in Japan.

Following the release of the Over & Over EP in 2012, the band went on an extended hiatus with its three members relocating to different corners of the US, and it did not play live for four years. In 2016, it reunited to play 4th and 4th Fest in Columbus.

Each member continues to make music. Murphy has released solo material as The Girl in Times New Viking, and formed the duo Married FM. Elliott joined Ohio band Connections before forming his own group, Long Odds. Phillips has released music with Counter Intuits. In 2025, the band announced their first show in a decade, set for New York City in 2026.

== Music ==
Times New Viking was noted for its lo-fi aesthetic, recorded to cassette, which (along with its Ohio home) drew comparisons to Guided by Voices' early material. The band was considered part of the "shitgaze" genre, alongside contemporaries such as Psychedelic Horseshit, Sic Alps and Eat Skull. Notable features of the band's songs include shouted vocals, distorted drums and loud, trebly guitars in addition to tape hiss and brevity. The tracks on Rip It Off were mastered to a RMS -db value of 0 (or near to) making them comparatively as loud as possible. The group's lyrics are generally sloganistic and feature pop culture references.

With 2009's Born Again Revisited, the band recorded the album to VHS and said that the recording fidelity had increased by 25%. In 2010, the group released a 7" single available on their tours opening for Guided by Voices. The single, featuring "No Room to Live", displayed cleaner production, a result of the band utilizing proper recording studios for the first time – namely Musicol Recording studio and Columbus Discount Recordings. Merge Records stated before the release of Dancer Equired! that it would also feature this production style.

== Discography ==
=== Albums ===
- Dig Yourself (2005)
- Present the Paisley Reich (2007)
- Rip It Off (January 22, 2008)
- Born Again Revisited (September 22, 2009)
- Dancer Equired! (April 26, 2011)

=== EPs ===
- Stay Awake EP (2008)
- Over & Over EP (2012)

=== Singles ===
- "Busy Making Love and War" (2005)
- "My Head" (2007)
- "Call and Respond" (2008)
- "No Time, No Hope" (2009)
- "Move to California" (2009)
- "No Room to Live" (2011)

=== Split 7"s ===
- Times New Viking/Psychedelic Horseshit - Split (2006)
- Los Campesinos!/No Age/Times New Viking - Shred Your Face Tour Split (2008)
- The Axemen/Times New Viking - Tour Split (2009)
