= Rip It Off (Times New Viking album) =

Studio album by Times New Viking
- Released: US: January 22, 2008; UK: April 28, 2008
- Genre: Indie rock, lo-fi, noise pop
- Label: Matador Records

Times New Viking chronology
Present the Paisley Reich (2007)	Rip It Off (2008)	Born Again Revisited (2009)

Professional ratings
Review scores
Source	Rating
AllMusic	4/5 stars
The A.V. Club	C+
Robert Christgau	(1-star Honorable Mention)
Drowned in Sound	(9/10)
Pitchfork	(8.4/10)

Rip It Off is the third album by Columbus, Ohio-based trio Times New Viking. It is their first release for Matador Records, as their two previous albums were released on Siltbreeze Records.

== Track listing ==
1. "Teen Drama"
2. "(My Head)"
3. "RIP Allegory"
4. "Wait"
5. "Drop-Out"
6. "Come Together"
7. "Faces On Fire"
8. "Relevant: Now"
9. "Early 80s"
10. "Mean God"
11. "Another Day"
12. "The Apt."
13. "Off the Wall"
14. "End Of All Things"
15. "Times New Viking vs. Yo La Tengo"
16. "Post Teen Drama"
