= Glenn McDonald =

Glenn McDonald may refer to:

- Glenn McDonald (basketball)
- Glenn McDonald (data engineer)
