= List of ID3v1 genres =

ID3 is a metadata container most often used in conjunction with the MP3 audio file format. It allows information such as the title, artist, album, track number, and other information about the file to be stored in the file itself.

The ID3v1 series, in particular, stores genre as an 8-bit number (therefore ranging from 0 to 255, with the latter having the meaning of "undefined" or "not set"), allowing each file to have at most one genre out of a fixed list.

Genre definitions 0-79 follow the ID3 tag specification of 1999. More genres have been successively introduced in later Winamp versions.

== ID3v1 defined genres ==
=== Specification ===
0 to 19
Number	Genre
00	Blues
01	Classic rock
02	Country
03	Dance
04	Disco
05	Funk
06	Grunge
07	Hip-hop
08	Jazz
09	Metal
10	New age
11	Oldies
12	Other
13	Pop
14	Rhythm and blues
15	Rap
16	Reggae
17	Rock
18	Techno
19	Industrial

20 to 39
Number	Genre
20	Alternative
21	Ska
22	Death metal
23	Pranks
24	Soundtrack
25	Euro-techno
26	Ambient
27	Trip-hop
28	Vocal
29	Jazz & funk
30	Fusion
31	Trance
32	Classical
33	Instrumental
34	Acid
35	House
36	Game
37	Sound clip
38	Gospel
39	Noise

40 to 59
Number	Genre
40	Alternative rock
41	Bass
42	Soul
43	Punk
44	Space
45	Meditative
46	Instrumental pop
47	Instrumental rock
48	Ethnic
49	Gothic
50	Darkwave
51	Techno-industrial
52	Electronic
53	Pop-folk
54	Eurodance
55	Dream
56	Southern rock
57	Comedy
58	Cult
59	Gangsta

60 to 79
Number	Genre
60	Top 40
61	Christian rap
62	Pop/funk
63	Jungle music
64	Native US
65	Cabaret
66	New wave
67	Psychedelic
68	Rave
69	Showtunes
70	Trailer
71	Lo-fi
72	Tribal
73	Acid punk
74	Acid jazz
75	Polka
76	Retro
77	Musical
78	Rock 'n' roll
79	Hard rock

=== Extension by Winamp ===
80 to 99
Number	Genre
80	Folk
81	Folk rock
82	National folk
83	Swing
84	Fast fusion
85	Bebop
86	Latin
87	Revival
88	Celtic
89	Bluegrass
90	Avantgarde
91	Gothic rock
92	Progressive rock
93	Psychedelic rock
94	Symphonic rock
95	Slow rock
96	Big band
97	Chorus
98	Easy listening
99	Acoustic

100 to 119
Number	Genre
100	Humour
101	Speech
102	Chanson
103	Opera
104	Chamber music
105	Sonata
106	Symphony
107	Booty bass
108	Primus
109	Porn groove
110	Satire
111	Slow jam
112	Club
113	Tango
114	Samba
115	Folklore
116	Ballad
117	Power ballad
118	Rhythmic Soul
119	Freestyle

120 to 141
Number	Genre
120	Duet
121	Punk rock
122	Drum solo
123	A cappella
124	Euro-house
125	Dance hall
126	Goa music
127	Drum & bass
128	Club-house
129	Hardcore techno
130	Terror
131	Indie
132	Britpop
133	Negerpunk
134	Polsk punk
135	Beat
136	Christian gangsta rap
137	Heavy metal
138	Black metal
139	Crossover
140	Contemporary Christian
141	Christian rock

142 to 147 (since 1 June 1998 [Winamp 1.91])
Number	Genre
142	Merengue
143	Salsa
144	Thrash metal
145	Anime
146	Jpop
147	Synthpop

148 to 191 (from November 2010, [Winamp 5.6])
Number	Genre
148	Christmas
149	Art rock
150	Baroque
151	Bhangra
152	Big beat
153	Breakbeat
154	Chillout
155	Downtempo
156	Dub
157	EBM
158	Eclectic
159	Electro
160	Electroclash
161	Emo
162	Experimental
163	Garage
164	Global
165	IDM
166	Illbient
167	Industro-Goth
168	Jam band
169	Krautrock
170	Leftfield
171	Lounge
172	Math rock
173	New romantic
174	Nu-breakz
175	Post-punk
176	Post-rock
177	Psytrance
178	Shoegaze
179	Space rock
180	Trop rock
181	World music
182	Neoclassical
183	Audiobook
184	Audio theatre
185	Neue Deutsche Welle
186	Podcast
187	Indie rock
188	G-Funk
189	Dubstep
190	Garage rock
191	Psybient
