= List of hardcore punk genres =

This is a list of hardcore punk musical genres.

- Bandana thrash
- Beatdown hardcore
- Christian hardcore
- Cybergrind
- Crossover thrash
- Crunkcore
- Crust punk
- D-beat
- Deathcore
- Digital hardcore
- Easycore
- Electronicore
- Grindcore
- Jazzcore
- Krishnacore
- Mathcore
- Melodic hardcore
- Melodic metalcore
- Metalcore
- Nardcore
- Nintendocore
- Noisecore
- Nu metalcore
- Positive hardcore
- Post-hardcore
- Powerviolence
- Progressive metalcore
- Queercore
- Rapcore
- Risecore
- Sass
- Screamo
- Skacore
- Thrashcore
- Tough guy hardcore

== See also ==
- Punk rock subgenres
- Heavy metal genres
- List of rock genres
- Punk rock
- Punk subculture
- List of microgenres
