= Every Noise at Once =

Music discovery website

- Website type: Music genre database
- Owner: The Echo Nest (2013); Spotify (2013–2023)
- Founder: Glenn McDonald
- Website: everynoise.com
- Launched: May 2013

Every Noise at Once is a music discovery website created by former Spotify employee Glenn McDonald. It operates as a directory of musical genres, artists, and tracks listed by Spotify, in a scatter plot word map style. Since December 2023, McDonald has no longer been able to update the site with new data after he was laid off from Spotify.

In 2019, McDonald's metadata contributions to Spotify's algorithm, which drew from Every Noise at Once, led to the creation of the influential "hyperpop" Spotify playlist. Led by senior editor Lizzy Szabo, the playlist became instrumental in the wider popularization of the movement.

== Features ==
The website operates as a directory which maps and tracks the algorithmically generated musical genres listed on Spotify, which are usually not visible on the Spotify app itself aside from its yearly Spotify Wrapped event. These genres are arranged on a long word map in a colour coded scatter plot structure such that songs lower down are more "organic" and up is more "mechanical and electric", whereas left is "denser and more atmospheric" and right is "spikier and bouncier". Users can click on the name of a genre to hear a 30-second sample of a song, click on chevrons next to any genre name to display another word map of artists corresponding to that genre, and click on the chevrons next to an artist's name to view their tracks as well as a list the genres that their music fits within.

Each genre is given its own dedicated Spotify playlist. The site also provides information on popular songs and new releases for each genre, and allows exploration by city, by country, by label or by gender.

Genres listed on the website, and thus in Spotify's list of genres, include shoegaze, freak folk, doomcore, Viking metal, escape room, happy hardcore, goregrind, sky room, grungegaze, dungeon synth, filthstep, deep filthstep, brostep, liquid funk, neo-pagan and didgeridoo music. It also covers genres from specific nations including German show tunes, Polish reggae, Russian drain, Greek hip hop, Estonian pop, German oi! and Finnish jazz.

== History ==
McDonald created Every Noise at Once when he was working at music intelligence firm the Echo Nest. This company was acquired by Spotify in 2013, and the genre mapping data created by McDonald was built into various Spotify features, including its "Daily Mix" and "Fans also like" recommendation functions. He added a list mode for genres in May 2014.

In 2019, McDonald's metadata contributions to Spotify's algorithm, which drew data from Every Noise at Once, leading to the addition of the term "hyperpop" in 2018, led to the creation of the influential "hyperpop" Spotify playlist, led by senior editor Lizzy Szabo, the playlist became instrumental in the wider popularization of the movement.

By December 2020, the site hosted 5,071 genre distinctions, and by October 2021 it hosted 5,602.

On December 4, 2023, McDonald was one of the 1,500 employees laid off by Spotify. As a result, he lost access to the data needed to maintain and update the website's database; it was no longer updated with new music from this point, and he lost the ability to fix any errors caused by changes on Spotify's end. At this point, he and his team had categorized tracks from about one million artists into 6,291 named genres, including 56 kinds of reggae, 202 kinds of folk and 230 kinds of hip hop. A spokesperson for Spotify stated that the current status of Every Noise was likely to remain for the foreseeable future.

== Reception ==
Following McDonald's being laid off in December 2023, Jess Weatherbed of The Verge stated that Every Noise at Once provided "simplicity" to its users, "a set of basic discovery features that allowed people to explore new genres and browse new music within those genres without filtering through a deluge of algorithmic recommendations. It's a native utility that Spotify is noticeably lacking, despite having the data readily available to implement it if the company wished to do so." She stated that it was "truly one of the best things about Spotify, despite never being an official part of the service." Billboard Canada described it as "one of the most extraordinary sites on the internet" and "gloriously minimalist".

== See also ==
- The Echo Nest
- Music information retrieval
