= Dancer Equired! =

Dancer Equired

Studio album by Times New Viking
- Released: April 26, 2011
- Genres: Alternative rock, lo-fi, noise pop
- Length: 31:30
- Label: Merge Records

Times New Viking chronology
Born Again Revisited (2009)	Dancer Equired (2011)

Professional ratings
Aggregate scores
Source	Rating
Metacritic	73/100
Review scores
Source	Rating
AllMusic	4/5 stars
The A.V. Club	B+
Clash	7/10
Consequence of Sound	C+
Drowned in Sound	8/10
NME	2.5/5 stars
Paste Magazine	8.2/10
Pitchfork Media	6/10
Tiny Mix Tapes	4/5 stars
Under the Radar	6/10

Dancer Equired is the fifth album by Columbus, Ohio-based trio Times New Viking, and their first release for Merge Records.

== Track listing ==
1. "It’s a Culture" – 2:23
2. "Ever Falling in Love" – 2:36
3. "No Room to Live" – 2:20
4. "Try Harder" – 1:58
5. "California Roll" – 1:38
6. "Ways to Go" – 2:28
7. "New Vertical Dwellings" – 1:08
8. "Downtown Eastern Bloc" – 3:38
9. "More Rumours" – 1:59
10. "Don’t Go to Liverpool" – 1:51
11. "Fuck Her Tears" – 2:08
12. "Want to Exist" – 3:00
13. "Somebody’s Slave" – 2:45
14. "No Good" – 1:40
