= Music genre =

Classification of music by tradition or style

A music genre is a conventional category that identifies some pieces of music as belonging to a shared tradition or set of conventions. Genre is to be distinguished from musical form and musical style, although in practice these terms are sometimes used interchangeably.

Music can be divided into genres in numerous ways, sometimes broadly and with polarity, e.g., popular music as opposed to art music or folk music, or, as another example, religious music and secular music. Often, however, classification draws on the proliferation of derivative subgenres, fusion genres, and microgenres that has started to accrue, e.g., screamo, country pop, and mumble rap, respectively. The artistic nature of music means that these classifications are often subjective and controversial, and some may overlap. As genres evolve, novel music is sometimes lumped into existing categories.

== Definitions ==
Douglass M. Green distinguishes between genre and form in his 1965 book Form in Tonal Music. He lists madrigal, motet, canzona, ricercar, and dance as examples of genres from the Renaissance period. To further clarify the meaning of genre, Green writes about "Beethoven's Op. 61" and "Mendelssohn's Op. 64 ". He explains that both are identical in genre and are violin concertos that have different forms. However, Mozart's Rondo for Piano, K. 511, and the Agnus Dei from his Mass, K. 317, are quite different in genre but happen to be similar in form."

In 1982, Franco Fabbri proposed a definition of the musical genre that is now considered to be normative: "musical genre is a set of musical events (real or possible) whose course is governed by a definite set of socially accepted rules", where a musical event can be defined as "any type of activity performed around any type of event involving sound".

A music genre or subgenre may be defined by the musical techniques, the cultural context, and the content and spirit of the themes. Geographical origin is sometimes used to identify a music genre, though a single geographical category will often include a wide variety of subgenres. Timothy Laurie argues that, since the early 1980s, "genre has graduated from being a subset of popular music studies to being an almost ubiquitous framework for constituting and evaluating musical research objects".

The term genre is generally defined similarly by many authors and musicologists, while the related term style has different interpretations and definitions. Some, like Peter van der Merwe, treat the terms genre and style as the same, saying that genre should be defined as pieces of music that share a certain style or "basic musical language". Others, such as Allan F. Moore, state that genre and style are two separate terms, and that secondary characteristics such as subject matter can also differentiate between genres.

=== Subtypes ===
A subgenre is a subordinate within a genre. In music terms, it is a subcategory of a musical genre that adopts its basic characteristics, but also has its own set of characteristics that clearly distinguish and set it apart within the genre. A subgenre is also sometimes referred to as a style within the genre. The proliferation of popular music in the 20th century has led to over 1,200 definable subgenres of music.

A musical composition may be situated in the intersection of two or more genres, sharing characteristics of each parent genre, and therefore belong to each of them at the same time. Such subgenres are known as fusion genres. Examples of fusion genres include jazz fusion, which is a fusion of jazz and rock music, and country rock which is a fusion of country music and rock music.

A microgenre is a niche genre, as well as a subcategory within major genres or their subgenres.

== Categorization and emergence of new genres ==
The genealogy of musical genres expresses, often in the form of a written chart. New genres of music can arise through the development of new styles of music; in addition to simply creating a new categorization. Although it is conceivable to create a musical style with no relation to existing genres, new styles usually appear under the influence of pre-existing genres.

Musicologists have sometimes classified music according to a trichotomous distinction such as Philip Tagg's "axiomatic triangle consisting of 'folk', 'art' and 'popular' musics". He explains that each of these three is distinguishable from the others according to certain criteria. Tagg maintains that popular music differs from art music through its mass distribution strategy as well as its non-written distribution modes which produces distinct production and consumption patterns between these musical categories.

=== Automatic recognition of genres ===
Automatic methods of musical similarity detection, based on data mining and co-occurrence analysis, have been developed to classify music titles for electronic music distribution.

Glenn McDonald, the employee of The Echo Nest, music intelligence and data platform, owned by Spotify, has created a categorical perception spectrum of genres and subgenres based on "an algorithmically generated, readability-adjusted scatter-plot of the musical genre-space, based on data tracked and analyzed for 5,315 genre-shaped distinctions by Spotify" called Every Noise at Once.

=== Alternative approaches ===
Alternatively, music can be assessed on the three dimensions of "arousal", "valence", and "depth". Arousal reflects physiological processes such as stimulation and relaxation (intense, forceful, abrasive, thrilling vs. gentle, calming, mellow), valence reflects emotion and mood processes (fun, happy, lively, enthusiastic, joyful vs. depressing, sad), and depth reflects cognitive processes (intelligent, sophisticated, inspiring, complex, poetic, deep, emotional, thoughtful vs. party music, danceable). These help explain why many people like similar songs from different traditionally segregated genres.

Starting from the end of the 20th century, Vincenzo Caporaletti has proposed a more comprehensive distinction of music genres based on the "formative medium" with which a music is created, that is the creative interface (cognitive milieu) employed by the artist. Following this framework, formative media may belong to two different matrixes: visual or audiotactile with regards to the role played in the creative process by the visual rationality or the bodily sensitivity and embodied cognition. The theory developed by Caporaletti, named Audiotactile Music Theory, categorises music in three different branches: 1) written music, like the so-called classical music, that is created using the visual matrix; 2) oral music (like folk music or ethnic music before the advent of sound recording technologies); 3) Audiotactile music, which are process of production and transmission is pivoted around sound recording technologies (for example jazz, pop, rock, rap and so on). These last two branches are created by means of the above-mentioned audiotactile matrix in which the formative medium is the Audiotactile Principle.

== Major music genres ==
=== Art music (Classical Music) ===
Art music primarily includes classical traditions, including both contemporary and historical classical music forms. Art music exists in many parts of the world. It emphasizes formal styles that invite technical and detailed deconstruction and criticism, and demand focused attention from the listener. In Western practice, art music is considered primarily a written musical tradition, preserved in some form of music notation rather than being transmitted orally, by rote, or in recordings, as popular and traditional music usually are. Historically, most western art music has been written down using the standard forms of music notation that evolved in Europe, beginning well before the Renaissance and reaching its maturity in the Romantic period.

The identity of a "work" or "piece" of art music is usually defined by the notated version rather than by a particular performance and is primarily associated with the composer rather than the performer (though composers may leave performers with some opportunity for interpretation or improvisation). This is so particularly in the case of western classical music. Art music may include certain forms of jazz, though some feel that jazz is primarily a form of popular music. The 1960s saw a wave of avant-garde experimentation in free jazz, represented by artists such as Ornette Coleman, Sun Ra, Albert Ayler, Archie Shepp and Don Cherry. Additionally, avant-garde rock artists such as Frank Zappa, Captain Beefheart, and the Residents released art music albums.

=== Popular music ===
Popular music is any musical style accessible to the general public and disseminated by the mass media. Musicologist and popular music specialist Philip Tagg defined the notion in the light of sociocultural and economical aspects:

Popular music, unlike art music, is (1) conceived for mass distribution to large and often socioculturally heterogeneous groups of listeners, (2) stored and distributed in non-written form, (3) only possible in an industrial monetary economy where it becomes a commodity and (4) in capitalist societies, subject to the laws of 'free' enterprise_ it should ideally sell as much as possible.

The distinction between classical and popular music has sometimes been blurred in marginal areas such as minimalist music and light classics. Background music for films/movies often draws on both traditions. In this respect, music is like fiction, which likewise draws a distinction between literary fiction and popular fiction that is not always precise.

==== Country music ====
Country music, also known as country and western (or simply country) and hillbilly music, is a genre of popular music that originated in the southern United States in the early 1920s. The origin of country music stems from European folk music as well as ballads and dance tunes brought by British immigrants who combined these elements with blues and spirituals of African Americans to create a separate musical form.

==== Electronic music ====
Electronic music is music that employs electronic musical instruments, digital instruments, or circuitry-based music technology in its creation. Contemporary electronic music includes many varieties and ranges from experimental art music to popular forms such as electronic dance music (EDM).

==== Funk ====
Funk is a music genre that originated in African American communities in the mid-1960s when musicians created a rhythmic, danceable new form of music through a mixture of soul, jazz, and rhythm and blues (R&B).

==== Hip-hop ====
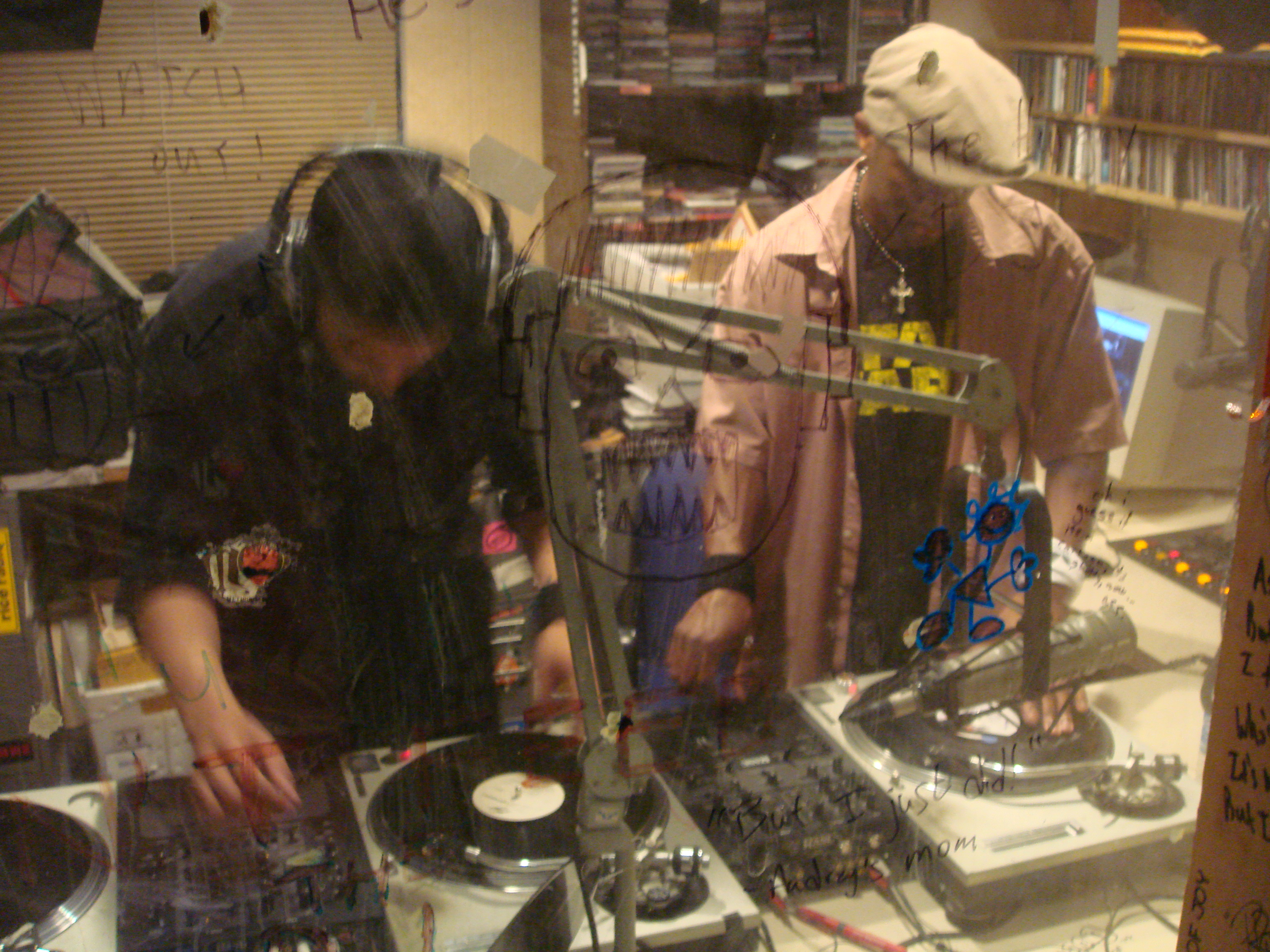
Two DJs practicing turntablism

Hip-hop or hip hop (originally known as disco rap, also as hip-hop music and sometimes rap music or rap) is a genre of music that emerged in the early 1970s alongside a hip-hop subculture built by the African-American and Latino communities of New York City. The musical style is characterized by the synthesis of a wide range of techniques, but rapping is frequent enough that it has nearly become a defining characteristic. Other key markers of the genre are the disc jockey (DJ), turntablism, scratching, beatboxing, and instrumental tracks. Cultural interchange has always been central to the hip-hop genre; it simultaneously borrows from its social environment while commenting on it. It can be broadly defined as a stylized rhythmic music that commonly accompanies rapping, a rhythmic and rhyming speech that is chanted.

==== Jazz ====
Jazz is a music genre that originated in the African-American communities of New Orleans, Louisiana, United States, in the late 19th and early 20th centuries, with its roots in blues and ragtime.

==== Latin music ====
Latin music is a genre of music that originated in the United States due to the growing influence of Latino Americans in the music industry. It is a term used by the music industry to describe music in a catch-all category for various music styles from Ibero-America.

==== Pop music ====
Pop is a genre of popular music that originated in its modern form during the mid-1950s in the United States and the United Kingdom. The terms popular music and pop music are often used interchangeably, although the former describes all music that is popular and includes many disparate styles.

==== Punk ====
The aggressiveness of the musical and performative style, based on structural simplicity and the vigorous rhythms of rock'n'roll style, reinforced the challenging and provocative character, within the universe of modern music.

==== Reggae ====
Reggae music, originating from the late 1960s Jamaica, is a genre of music that was originally used by Jamaicans to define themselves with their lifestyle and social aspects. The meaning behind reggae songs tend to be about love, faith or a higher power, and freedom. Reggae music is important to Jamaican culture as it has been used as inspiration for many third world liberation movements. Bob Marley and the Wailers performed at Zimbabwe's independence celebrations in 1980. The music genre of reggae is known to incorporate stylistic techniques from rhythm and blues, jazz, African, Caribbean, and other genres as well but what makes reggae unique are the vocals and lyrics. The vocals tend to be sung in Jamaican Patois, Jamaican English, and Iyaric dialects. The lyrics of reggae music usually tend to raise political awareness and on cultural perspectives.

==== Rock music ====
Rock music is a broad genre of popular music that originated as "rock and roll" in the United States in the late 1940s and early 1950s, developing into a range of different styles in the mid-1960s and later, particularly in the United States and the United Kingdom.

==== Heavy Metal/Metal music ====
Heavy metal evolved from hard rock, psychedelic rock, and blues rock in late 1960s and 1970s with notable acts such as Black Sabbath, Judas Priest and Motörhead. The popularity of heavy metal soared in the 1980s with bands such as Iron Maiden, Metallica and Guns N' Roses. It has a rougher style and heavier sound than other forms of rock music, with notable subgenres such as thrash metal, hair metal and death metal.

==== Soca ====
Soca music, or the "soul of calypso", is a genre of music that originated in Trinidad and Tobago in the 1970s. It is considered an offshoot of calypso, with influences from Afro-Trinidadian and Indo-Trinidadian rhythms. It was created by Ras Shorty I (or Lord Shorty) in an effort to revive traditional calypso, the popularity of which had been declining amongst younger generations in Trinidad due to the rise in popularity of reggae from Jamaica and soul and funk from the United States. From the 1980s onward, soca has developed into a range of new styles.

==== Soul music and R&B ====
Soul music became a musical genre that came to include a wide variety of R&B-based music styles from the pop R&B acts at Motown Records in Detroit, such as the Temptations, Gladys Knight & the Pips, Marvin Gaye and Four Tops, to "deep soul" singers such as Percy Sledge and James Carr.

==== Polka ====
The polka is originally a Czech dance and genre of dance music familiar throughout Europe and the Americas.

=== Religious music ===
Religious music (also referred as sacred music) is music performed or composed for religious use or through religious influence. Gospel, spiritual, and Christian music are examples of religious music.

=== Traditional and folk music ===
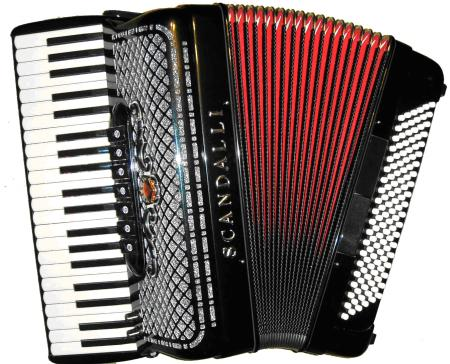
Piano accordion: Italian instrument used in several cultures

Traditional and folk music are very similar categories, but it is widely accepted that traditional music encompasses folk music. According to the ICTM (International Council for Traditional Music), traditional music are songs and tunes that have been performed over a long period of time (usually several generations).

The folk music genre is classified as the music that is orally passed from one generation to another. Usually, the artist is unknown, and there are several versions of the same song. The genre is transmitted by singing, listening and dancing to popular songs. This type of communication allows culture to transmit the styles (pitches and cadences) as well as the context it was developed.

Culturally transmitting folk songs maintain rich evidence about the period of history when they were created and the social class in which they developed. Some examples of the Folk Genre can be seen in the folk music of England and Turkish folk music. English folk music has developed since the medieval period and has been transmitted from that time until today. Similarly, Turkish folk music relates to all the civilizations that once passed thorough Turkey, thereby being a world reference since the east–west tensions during the Early Modern Period.

Traditional folk music usually refers to songs composed in the twentieth century, which tend to be written as universal truths and big issues of the time they were composed. Artists including Bob Dylan; Peter, Paul and Mary; James Taylor; and Leonard Cohen, transformed folk music to what it is known today. Newer composers such as Ed Sheeran (pop folk) and the Lumineers (American folk) are examples of contemporary folk music, which has been recorded and adapted to the new way of listening to music (online)—unlike the traditional way of orally transmitting music.

Each country in the world, in some cases each region, district and community, has its own folk music style. The sub-divisions of folk genre are developed by each place, cultural identity and history. Because the music is developed in different places, many of the instruments are characteristic to location and population—but some are used everywhere: button or piano accordion, different types of flutes or trumpets, banjo, and ukulele. Both French and Scottish folk music use related instruments such as the fiddle, the harp and variations of bagpipes.

== Psychology of music preference ==
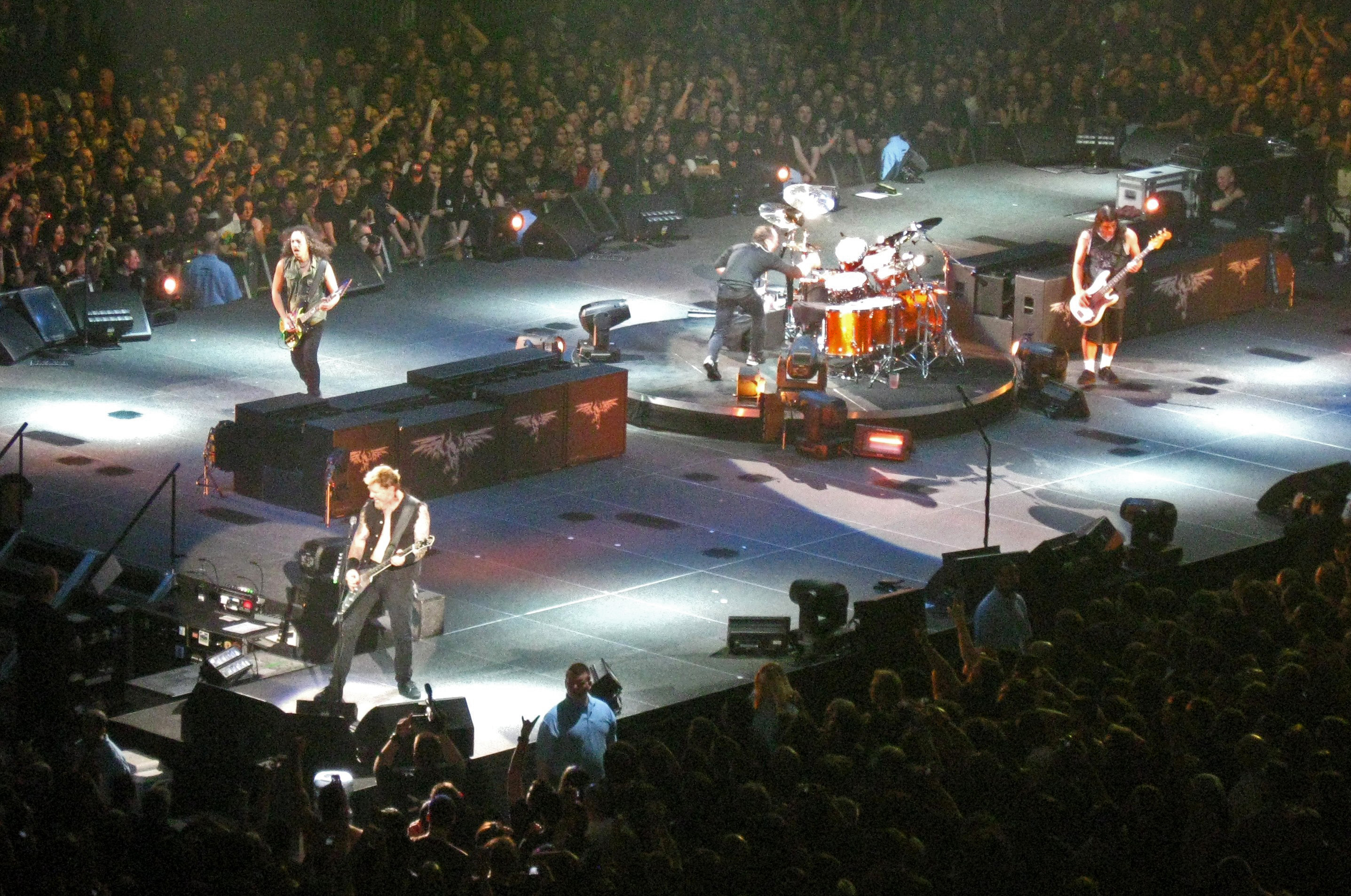
Metallica performing at the O2 Arena, March 28, 2009

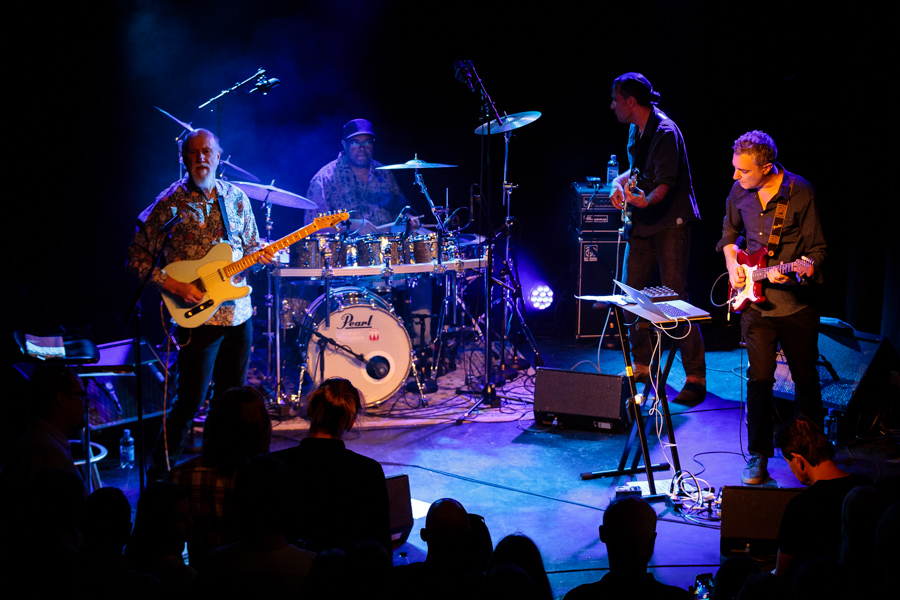
John Scofield at the stage of Energimølla. The concert was part of Kongsberg Jazzfestival and took place on July 6, 2017

=== Social influences on music selection ===
Since music has become more easily accessible (Spotify, iTunes, YouTube, etc.), more people have begun listening to a broader and wider range of music styles. In addition, social identity also plays a large role in music preference. Personality is a key contributor for music selection. Those who consider themselves to be "rebels" will tend to choose heavier music styles like heavy metal or hard rock, while those who consider themselves to be more "relaxed" or "laid back" will tend to choose lighter music styles like jazz or classical music. According to one model, there are five main factors that exist that underlie music preferences that are genre-free, and reflect emotional/affective responses. These five factors are:

1. A Mellow factor consisting of smooth and relaxing styles (jazz, classical, etc.).
2. An Urban factor defined largely by rhythmic and percussive music (rap, hip-hop, funk, etc.).
3. A Sophisticated factor (operatic, world, etc.)
4. An Intensity factor that is defined by forceful, loud, and energetic music (rock, metal, etc.).
5. A campestral factor, which refers to singer-songwriter genres and country.

=== Individual and situational influences ===
Studies have shown that while women prefer more treble oriented music, men prefer to listen to bass-heavy music. A preference for bass-heavy music is sometimes paired with borderline and antisocial personalities.

Age is another strong factor that contributes to musical preference. Evidence is available that shows that music preference can change as one gets older. A Canadian study showed that adolescents show greater interest in pop music artists while adults and the elderly population prefer classic genres such as rock, opera, and jazz.

== See also ==
- Billboard charts, which defines a list of genres
- Composition school
- List of Grammy Award categories, which defines a list of genres
- List of music genres and styles
- List of radio formats
- List of ID3v1 Genres
- Radio Data System, which enables the tagging of the genre of broadcasts within defined categories
