= Shitgaze =

2000s microgenre

- Other names: New Lo-Fi; Clowning on Bitches
- Stylistic origins: Lo-fi; DIY; noise rock; noise pop; indie rock; slacker rock; garage rock; garage punk; psychedelic rock
- Cultural origins: c. 2005, Columbus, Ohio and Los Angeles, California

Other topics
- Shoegaze; pigfuck; blog rock; indie surf; no-fi; internet music; microgenre

Shitgaze is a microgenre of rock music and scene coined in 2005 by Kevin DeBroux of Pink Reason to describe the music of Midwestern rock band Psychedelic Horseshit from Columbus, Ohio. Lead singer Matt Whitehurst added the term to the band's Myspace page, where it became the tag for a "Columbus-centric genre". It was then adopted by the music press and used to describe bands with a similar aesthetic from other locations, such as Los Angeles.

The independent record label Siltbreeze was a central hub for the scene, along with the Columbus music venue Cafe Bourbon Street. Whitehurst cites the NME's feature on shitgaze as what "made it into a scene". The style is characterized by its use of lo-fi production, guitar feedback, fuzz pedals, audio clipping and distorted sounds in general.

Notable acts include Psychedelic Horseshit, the Hospitals, No Age, Times New Viking, Wavves, Railcars Grave Babies, Sic Alps, Vivian Girls, Sealings, Best Coast, Meth Teeth, Pink Reason, the Bitters, Eat Skull, the Intelligence, Gang Wizard, Ty Segall, and P.H.F.

== Characteristics ==
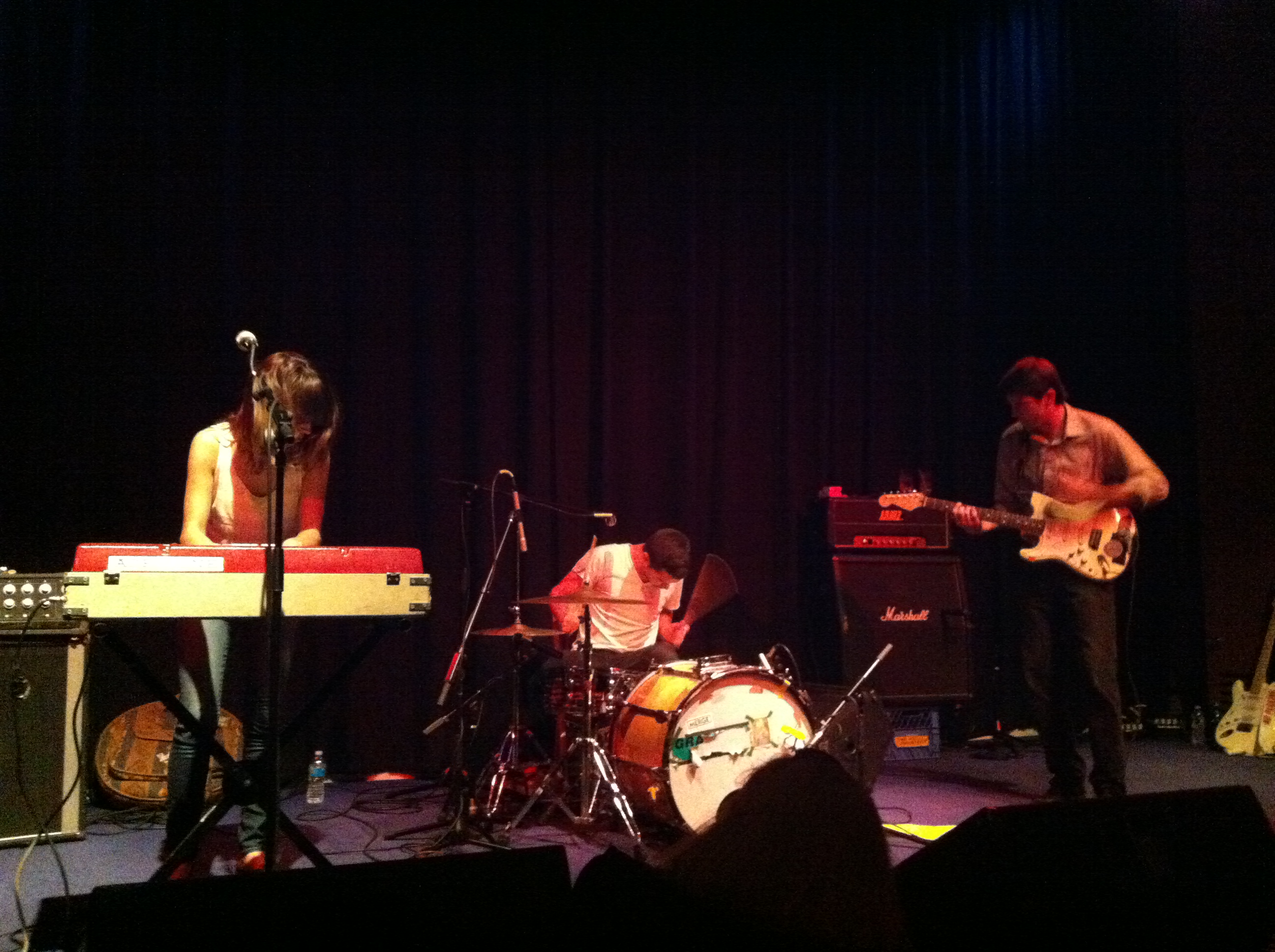
Times New Viking in Pittsburgh, 2011

Shitgaze has been referred to as a "microgenre", a category that proliferated in underground music culture in the late 2000s. Artists primarily made use of "sub-par equipment" around a low budget DIY and lo-fi aesthetic, while drawing influence from bands in the genres of garage punk, noise pop, and noise rock. Additionally, artists primarily gained popularity through early music blogs and online music forums within the emerging blog rock movement.

A Spin magazine feature described bands labeled as shitgaze as "spik[ing] in the red and cloaked in caustic fuzz. Vocals are intelligible every so often, and snare hits resemble chopsticks on tinfoil. You could say Psychedelic Horseshit's bass drum sounds like a cardboard box", and that their music was "not too far removed from the output of fellow Ohioans Guided by Voices." In 2015, New York magazine The Fader described shitgaze as a development of "Heavily distorted no-fi guitar rock".

== Etymology ==
The term shitgaze is a portmanteau of "shoegaze" coined by Kevin DeBroux of Pink Reason in 2005 as an "inside-joke" to describe the music of the Midwestern rock band Psychedelic Horseshit, he later became the bassist for the band. In a 2008 interview with Spin magazine, DeBroux remarked: "We were sitting around stoned listening to the Psychedelic Horseshit album, and I knew Matt [Whitehurst] was into ['90s U.K] shoegaze stuff, [...] I'm like, 'Man, this isn't shoegaze; this is shitgaze."

According to Spin, "Whitehurst stuck the word up on Horseshit's Myspace page, and it became the tag for a Columbus-centric genre, though it's also becoming an umbrella term for other lo-fi Midwesterners such as Tyvek and TV Ghost". In a 2011 interview with the Quietus, Matt Whitehurst of Psychedelic Horseshit stated:

It started off as a joke. I had a test of our first album that I was playing in the car and me and my friend Kevin [DeBroux] – who is in a band called Pink Reason – were listening to it. I was saying 'this is the shoegaze song' and he said 'yeah, but it is a really shit version of shoegaze. It is totally shitgaze.' It was a joke and I put it on MySpace and then NME wrote an article and made it into a scene. They found these bands that had similar sounds and wrote a feature. Then all these other publications took off with it as well. The next thing you know, Spin magazine and MTV were talking about shitgaze and coming to Columbus to interview us. It was so ridiculous. Honestly, it was just a joke – two stoners driving down the road.

The term became associated first with a specific music scene in Columbus, Ohio as both Psychedelic Horseshit and Times New Viking had formed there. The term then saw prominence in the 2000s West Coast garage punk scene, which included artists like Ty Segall, the Intelligence, Gang Wizard, and the Hospitals, the latter of which featured then Coachwhips guitarist John Dwyer. Subsequently underground music artists and bloggers further adopted the label.

Shitgaze has also been referred to as "New Lo-Fi" and "Clowning on Bitches", the latter arose through the magazine Terminal Boredom which introduced a coding script which replaced all mentions of shitgaze on the site to "CLOWNING ON BITCHES." In reflection, Beth Murphy, the keyboardist of Times New Viking stated, "I'd rather be called shitpop or tweecore".

== History ==
=== Origins ===
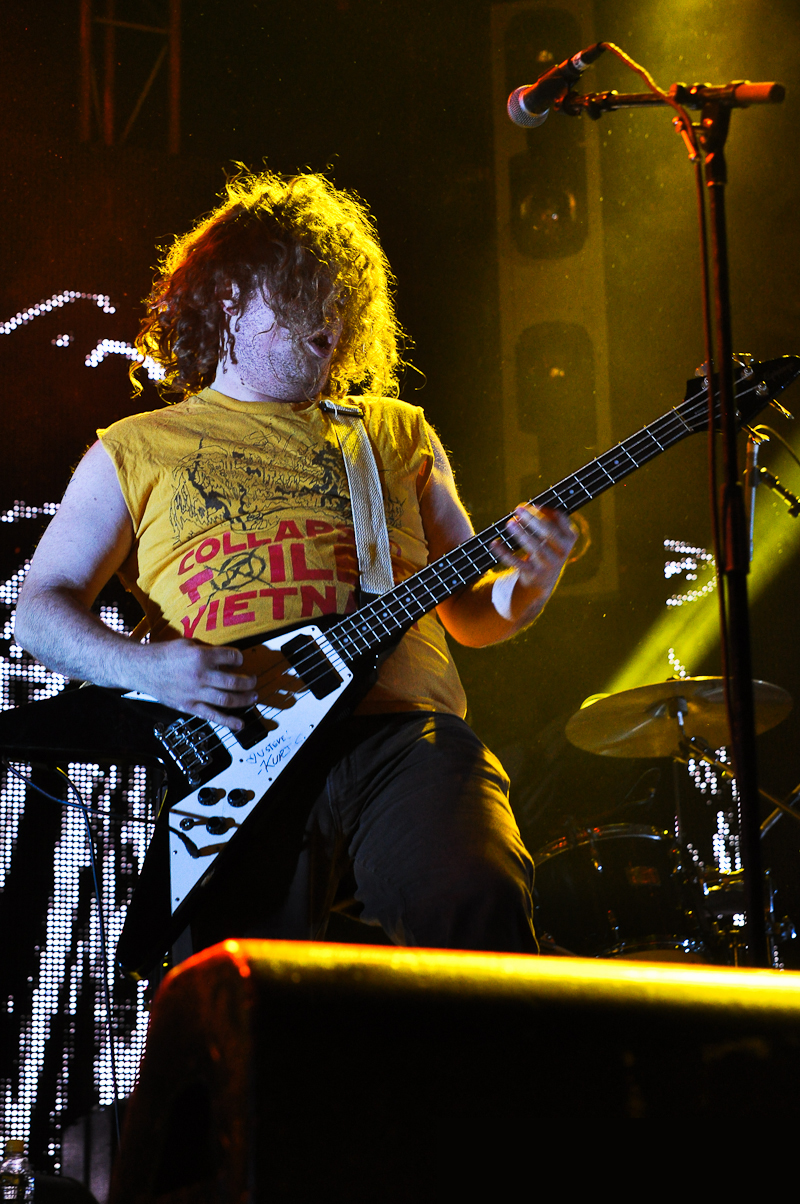
Wavves performing in 2012; their early material has been described as shitgaze.

According to Spin magazine, Times New Viking's Dig Yourself (2005) was the start of the shitgaze scene followed by Present the Paisley Reich (2007) and Rip It Off (2008), with vinyl being "the medium of choice for shitgazers". While citing other releases such as Psychedelic Horseshit's debut album, Magic Flowers Droned (2007) as "required listening" and Pink Reason's Cleaning the Mirror (2009) as "a more intimate and personal DIY gem."

The Philadelphia independent record label Siltbreeze, founded in 1989, though initially associated with general underground music, experienced renewed interest through the emergence of shitgaze, and became a central hub for the movement during the mid-to late 2000s. Siltbreeze released many early shitgaze recordings by bands such as Vivian Girls, Psychedelic Horseshit, Eat Skull, Pink Reason and Times New Viking. Spin described the "hub" of the scene as taking place in a Columbus venue known as Cafe Bourbon Street.

San Diego rock band Wavves are regarded as one of the most notable and commercially successful bands to emerge from the original shitgaze scene, with the sound later proliferating and intertwining with bands like Best Coast. Though the term was not coined online, music blogs and sites like Vice, Spin, NME and Pitchfork helped further popularize shitgaze through various articles and reviews during the late 2000s and early 2010s.

In 2009, Pitchfork published a readers poll that ranked "Shitgaze/lo-fi aesthetics (Times New Viking, Wavves, Vivian Girls)" at number 2 on their list titled "Trend You Wish Would Go Away".

=== Decline ===
Shitgaze has been regarded as falling out of prominence in the mid-2010s, as other blog-related music scenes like bloghouse, blog rock and blog rap declined due to the rise in online streaming algorithms. Mike Lesuer of Flood Magazine wrote that of the "subgenres that define the early-'10s, many of them can only be stumbled upon in 2023 by finding a Tumblr account that hasn't seen activity since the height of seapunk—which, like witch house, likely faded from memory because no one could think of a cooler name for it".

== See also ==
- Pigfuck
- Indie surf
