= Psychedelic Horseshit =

American shitgaze band

- Origin: Columbus, Ohio, United States
- Genres: Shitgaze
- Years active: 2005–2014
- Labels: Siltbreeze, FatCat Records
- Past members: Matt Whitehurst (vocals, guitar); Rich Johnston (percussion); Ryan Jewell (keyboards); David Radosevic (bass, guitar); Kevin DeBroux (bass, guitar)

Psychedelic Horseshit was an American rock band formed in Columbus, Ohio in 2005 by Matt Whitehurst.

That same year, Kevin DeBroux of Pink Reason coined the microgenre and scene, known as "shitgaze" when referring to recordings of Horseshit's material. Lead singer Matt Whitehurst later added the term to the groups Myspace page where it was popularized. The band has been described as "shitgaze frontrunners" by The Times.

== History ==
The group was founded by Matt Whitehurst in 2005; he claims the band's name was coined off-the-cuff by Sarah Asher when he and a few musician friends landed a slot playing a jam band festival. The group's lo-fi sound, recorded with inexpensive equipment, was solidified over the recording of several CD-R releases in 2006 and 2007. The group's first 7" arrived in 2007 on Columbus Discount, followed by an EP; Siltbreeze picked the band up for a full-length, Magic Flowers Droned, in 2007. In 2009 the group re-released some of the old CD-R material as Golden Oldies, along with new songs as Shitgaze Anthems. Golden Oldies received a 5.2/10 rating on Pitchfork, and was called "tough to recommend", though Pitchfork says of Shitgaze Anthems, "never before have so many of their good ideas worked out quite so well." They also released the double seven-inch EP Too Many Hits as the final installment of the Columbus Discount Records Year One Singles Club in 2009. In 2011 the group released the album Laced, which received a 7.3/10 rating on Pitchfork. The album was called "more immediately enjoyable" than its prior releases.

== Members ==
- Matt Whitehurst – guitar, keyboards, vocals
- Rich Johnston – percussion
- Ryan Jewell – keyboards, percussion
- David Radosevic – bass, guitar

Former

- Jason Roxas – bass, keyboards
- Justin Burkett – bass
- Laura Bernazzoli – bass
- Jesse Baker – bass
- Andrew Graham – bass
- Kevin DeBroux – bass
- Ross Maddox – bass

== Discography ==
- Blown Speaker Standards (CD-R, 2006)
- King Tubby's Badness Dub (CD-R, 2006)
- "Who Let the Dogs Out?" (Columbus Discount Records, 2007)
- New Wave Hippies EP (Half Machine Records) (2007)
- Magic Flowers Droned (Siltbreeze, 2007)
- Golden Oldies (LP, 2009)
- Shitgaze Anthems (Woodsist Records, 2009)
- "Magic Flowers Dubbed" (EP, 2009)
- "Live At Pompeii" (EP, 2009)
- Too Many Hits (2×7" Columbus Discount Records, 2009)
- Acid Tape (Fan Death Records, 2010)
- Laced (Fatcat Records, 2011)
