= Glenn McDonald (data engineer) =

Former Spotify employee

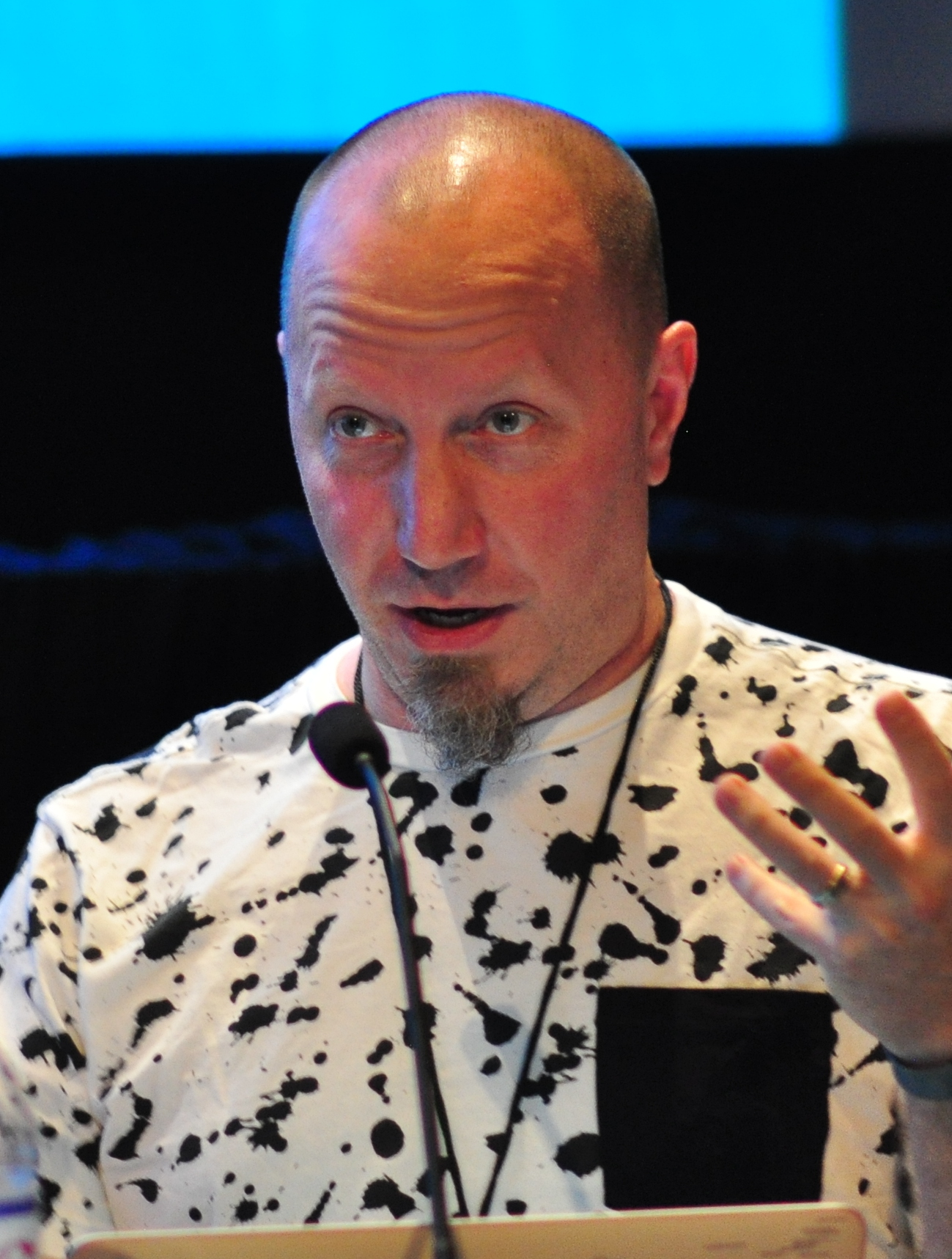
- McDonald in 2015
- Born: 1967 (age 58–59); Texas, U.S.
- Occupation: Data engineer
- Employer: Spotify (2013-2023)
- Known for: Every Noise at Once
- Website: furia.com

Glenn McDonald (born in 1967 in Texas, U.S.) is a former employee of the music and audio streaming company Spotify who was responsible for grouping and naming genres at the company. Often described by media as a "data alchemist", he created the music discovery website Every Noise at Once.

In 2019, McDonald's metadata contributions to Spotify's algorithm, which drew from Every Noise at Once, led to the creation of the influential "hyperpop" Spotify playlist. Led by senior editor Lizzy Szabo, the playlist became instrumental in the wider popularization of the movement.

== Career ==
McDonald worked for a time at the music intelligence firm The Echo Nest. This company was acquired by Spotify in 2013, and the genre mapping data created by McDonald was built into various Spotify features, including its "Daily Mix" and "Fans also like" recommendation functions. He created the Every Noise at Once website that year. Under Spotify, he continued to work as part of a team to categorize tracks from about one million artists into 6,291 named genres, including 56 kinds of reggae, 202 kinds of folk and 230 kinds of hip hop. He developed an algorithm for the company which evaluated music based on what he called "subjective psychoacoustic attributes", including "tempo," "duration," "color," "modernity," and "femininity." He then named what he called "emerging genres" himself, including the Spotify genre Escape Room, so named because of its sonic connection to trap music. In 2018, McDonald input the genre name "hyperpop" into this metadata through the algorithm of his site Every Noise at Once, which was later used to name Spotify's influential "Hyperpop" playlist, led by senior editor Lizzy Szabo, which later involved guest curation from 100 gecs and others in the scene. The playlist contributed to the movement's wider popularity in the early 2020s.

On December 4, 2023, McDonald was one of the 1,500 employees, or 17% of its workforce, laid off by Spotify. As a result, he lost access to the data needed to maintain and update his website's database, as well as the ability to fix any errors caused by possible changes on Spotify's end. A spokesperson for Spotify stated that the current status of Every Noise was likely to remain for the foreseeable future.

In 2024, McDonald's book You Have Not Yet Heard Your Favourite Song, about the increasing reliance of the music industry upon streaming, was published. In the book, he describes Spotify as "surveillance capitalism" that makes use of name, age, gender, location and existing tastes, but is limited in its knowledge. Upon the release of the 2024 edition of Spotify Wrapped, he criticised its rollout, stating that "the goal of Wrapped, in particular, is brand virality," and that "there’s not much in the way this year of data storytelling."
