= Blog rock =

Early online music scene

- Other names: Blog indie; blog-rock
- Stylistic origins: Indie rock; garage rock revival; post-punk revival
- Cultural origins: Mid-to late 2000s, United States

Other topics
- Bloghouse; blogosphere; shitgaze; landfill indie; microgenres; hypnagogic pop; blogspot scene; internet rock; indietronica

Blog rock (also known as blog indie) is a loosely defined style and era of indie rock that originally emerged from the online musical blogosphere in the mid-to late 2000s. Similarly to other early blog-related music scenes such as bloghouse and blog rap. The term was used to describe bands who garnered attention primarily through music blogs and online spaces, independent of formal music industry structures.

== Etymology and characteristics ==
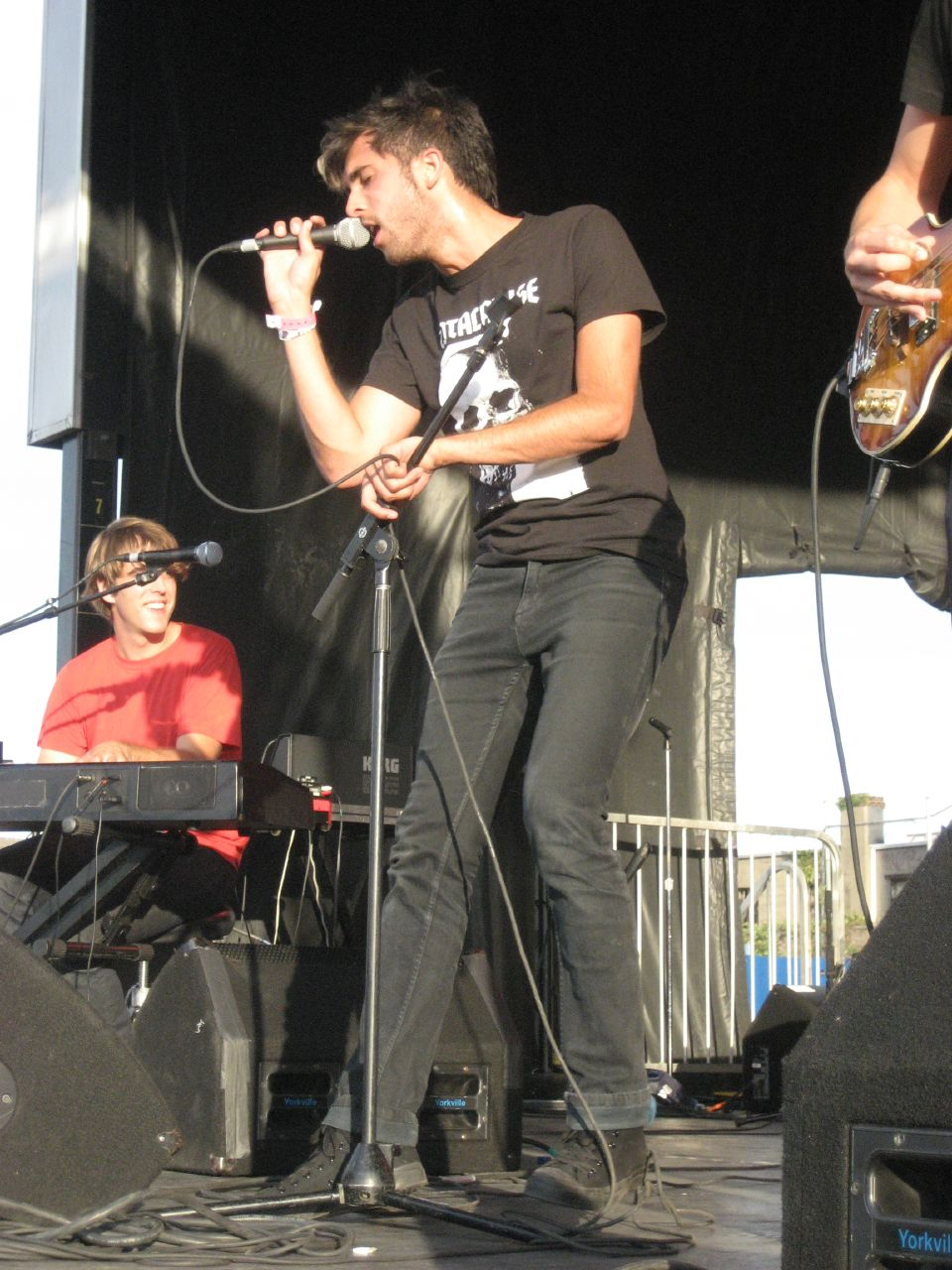
Voxtrot performing at Coney Island, New York, 2007.

Writer Peter C. Baker of the New Yorker, when writing about the blog rock era claimed that, "if the year 2005 were condensed into a single word, that word would be “blogroll." In 2008, the Quietus stated that though the term blog rock or "blog band" was initially used as a dismissive label, it quickly grew a life of its own, encompassing an emerging wave of indie bands that aimed to be "the next Arcade Fire or Modest Mouse", who also drew influences from influential indie bands like Pavement and primarily proliferated on MP3 blogs. The term "blog rock" was similar to "bloghouse".

In Chris DeVille's 2025 book on indie rock, Such Great Heights, he describes the term's "derogatory" meaning, saying that it "connoted something [...] specific: a cloying sort of indie band with fleeting success manufactured online, apart from real-world communities and institutions."

DeVille says that a "common error" is using the term imprecisely – "as a synonym for all 2000s indie rock". He says that a writer using it to refer to acts like Animal Collective, TV On The Radio, Grizzly Bear and Fleet Foxes is incorrect due to those groups being "too popular, too talented, and too long-lasting". DeVille gives examples of bands more suited to the term as Architecture in Helsinki, I'm from Barcelona, and Someone Still Loves You Boris Yeltsin.

== History ==
During the early 2000s, the NME coined "the New Rock Revolution" to describe a wave of emerging rock bands, spurred by the success of American acts such as the White Stripes and the Strokes, with the former spearheading the 2000s garage rock revival movement whilst the latter led the New York post-punk revival. These bands introduced a renewed interest in indie rock that coincided with the rise of online music discussion, blogging, Myspace, and the very early iterations of social media, which helped to define a new, organic form for bands to connect with and grow an audience, where artists gained attention for their music despite having no record label or promotion team behind them.

Blog rock refers less to a distinct musical style and more to the mode of distribution and discovery of an era where bands gained popularity primarily through the early stages of online music discussion on MP3 blogs and websites like Hype Machine, Music for Robots, Stereogum and Blogspot. Other online spaces included Internet forums, chatrooms as well as early social media platforms like Myspace and later Tumblr. The blog rock era took place primarily in the United States, with adjacent bands in the United Kingdom being labelled "landfill indie" by the British press. The era later became associated with the hipster subculture and "indie sleaze".

MGMT's Andrew VanWyngarden, whose band rose to prominence during the blog rock era, cited online music blogs as influential to his musical development during this period, stating:

I got hold of this [A Gift From Euphoria by Euphoria] before we started making the first MGMT album. I just found this on some random guy's psychedelic blog. I spend a lot of time on those sites going through and downloading stuff: records that are super-rare and you might spend $300 to get the physical copy.

By the mid-to-late 2000s, indie rock bands began to emerge that primarily generated hype and attention through online blog sites and music discussion spaces, Pitchfork and the New Yorker cite bands like Clap Your Hands Say Yeah and Voxtrot with pioneering and defining the sound of the blog-rock era.

Tim Jonze, writing for The Guardian in 2011, called it "unquestionably one of the decade's biggest indie trends, especially to those for whom 'indie' didn't just mean 'guitars' but rather a vaguely outsider/underground music made predominantly by skinny white men".

The Fader claimed that the initial popularity of infamous online music publications like Pitchfork was linked to that of the 2000s blog rock era, with the site also becoming instrumental in the proliferation of shitgaze, an internet microgenre coined in the early 2000s, which developed alongside the original blog-rock movement.

== Decline and legacy ==
The New Yorker cited the rise of online algorithms used by music streaming services like Spotify as one of the factors that led to the decline of blog rock, stating:

Now there are playlists on streaming platforms for every genre, micro-genre, mood, and vibe. When you hear a song that you like on a playlist, maybe you stream the album, too. When the album finishes, your platform suggests something else it thinks you’ll like. Then something else. Then something else. In the streaming universe, popularity is shaped less by the enthusiasm.

The Guardian argued that blog rock's decline was linked to a growing preference for nostalgia in indie music as well as the genre's lack of a political edge, stating that in a post-Bush world: "There's no machine to rage against any more, no one to be calculatedly hedonistic about."

Pitchfork stated that, "Blog Rock died once all the music blogs got smart and realized they could get more traffic posting new songs by bands that everybody already liked rather than trying to find new ones." Furthermore, they stated that indie rock band Car Seat Headrest's album Teens of Denial stood as "a triumph for the past three decades of indie rock: a unification of ’90s aesthetics, ’00s blog-rock ascendancy, and 21st-century consumption." The New Yorker described the blog rock era as a precursor to online distribution-driven music scenes like Soundcloud rap.

Some contemporary indie artists have been likened to or influenced by the blog rock era, such as Peter Cat Recording Co.'s BETA बेटा, Video Age's 2020 song Pleasure Line which was described by Pitchfork as rivaling "the biggest blog rock earworms had it come out any other year than 2020".

During the early 2020s, defining blog rock era bands like Voxtrot and Clap Your Hands Say Yeah reunited.

== See also ==
- Internet rock
