= The Echo Nest =

Music intelligence and data platform company

The Echo Nest Ltd.
- Type: Subsidiary
- Industry: Music
- Founder: Tristan Jehan; Brian Whitman
- Headquarters: Somerville, MA, United States
- Key people: Tristan Jehan (co-Founder & CTO); Brian Whitman (co-Founder & CTO); Jim Lucchese (CEO)
- Products: Music intelligence platform
- Parent: Spotify Technology S.A. (2014-present)

The Echo Nest is a music intelligence and data platform for developers and media companies. Owned by Spotify since 2014, the company is based in Somerville, MA. The Echo Nest began as a research spin-off from the MIT Media Lab to understand the audio and textual content of recorded music. Its creators intended it to perform music identification, recommendation, playlist creation, audio fingerprinting, and analysis for consumers and developers.

== History ==
The Echo Nest was founded in 2005 from the dissertation work of Tristan Jehan and Brian Whitman at the MIT Media Lab.

In October 2010, The Echo Nest received a $7 million venture financing from Matrix Partners and Commonwealth Capital Ventures.

In March 2014, The Echo Nest was acquired by Spotify for 49.7 million euro, consisting of cash and Spotify's equity.

== Products ==
The Echo Nest's product line was based on their automatically derived database of data about 30 million songs aggregated from web crawling, data mining, and digital signal processing techniques. The company also made its data available to developers via an API used by over 7,000 developers to build independent music applications. The API was shut down on 31 May 2016, and developers were encouraged to use the Spotify API instead.

The Echo Nest released data on 1 million songs for research purposes. The company was a co-organizer of Music Hack Day.

In June 2011, the company released Echoprint, an open source and open data acoustic fingerprinting library.

== Clients ==
The data powered music solutions for customers such as MTV, Island Def Jam, BBC, MOG, Warner Music Group, eMusic, Spotify, Rdio, Clear Channel, VEVO, Nokia, SiriusXM and Thumbplay.

== Spotify ==
The Echo Nest was acquired on 6 March 2014, by music streaming service Spotify. The music intelligence agency functions to help Spotify curate personalized music recommendations that are driven by algorithms. The Echo Nest is the driving force behind the playlists professionally curated on Spotify. To generate individualized Discover Weekly playlists as well as recommend suggestions in the 'Discover' section of Spotify's home page, individualized for every subscriber, the Echo Nest collects data on a user's listening habits and uses it to predict what music they will enjoy the most.

The Echo Nest has created Taste Profiles based on the listening patterns they notice about a user. Taste Profiles are an amalgamation of taste clusters of genres and subgenres. Taste Profiles and clusters are not publicly available for individual users to access but have been released to journalists and researchers.

An Echo Nest employee, Glenn McDonald, has created a categorical perception spectrum of genres and subgenres based on "an algorithmically-generated, readability-adjusted scatter-plot of the musical genre-space, based on data tracked and analyzed for 4,341 genre-shaped distinctions by Spotify" called Every Noise at Once.

The Echo Nest has created an internal tool for Spotify and Echo Nest employees called The Truffle Pig, which is used in Spotify to curate mood and occasion specific playlists. The Truffle Pig is a sonically advanced search engine that can be asked to search for songs based on adjectives or feelings. The search can also be redacted for particular qualities to produce higher levels of specificity. Playlists curated by Spotify are available for public access. They are created in part by the algorithms associated with The Truffle Pig and in part by the music experts employed by Spotify. To create these playlists, one of Spotify's thirty-two resident music experts will use the Truffle Pig search engine to find songs associated with a quality or theme. From the search results, the employee can hand pick songs perfect for any playlist. These playlists include "Your Favorite Coffeehouse" and "TGIF".

== See also ==
- Gracenote
- Pandora
- Spotify
