= Pigfuck =

Subgenre of noise rock

- Other names: Pigfucker
- Stylistic origins: Noise rock; post-hardcore
- Cultural origins: 1980s, United States

Other topics
- Robert Christgau; skronk; shitgaze; pornogrind; sludge metal

Pigfuck is a subgenre of noise rock. The term was originally coined as "pigfucker" by music journalist Robert Christgau in a 1987 Pazz & Jop essay in the Village Voice to describe the music of Sonic Youth and Big Black. The label later became associated with the sounds of American post-hardcore and noise rock groups like Big Black, Butthole Surfers, Cows, Scratch Acid, Killdozer, Pussy Galore, the Jesus Lizard and Flipper along with artists associated with the independent record labels Touch and Go and Amphetamine Reptile.

== Etymology and characteristics ==
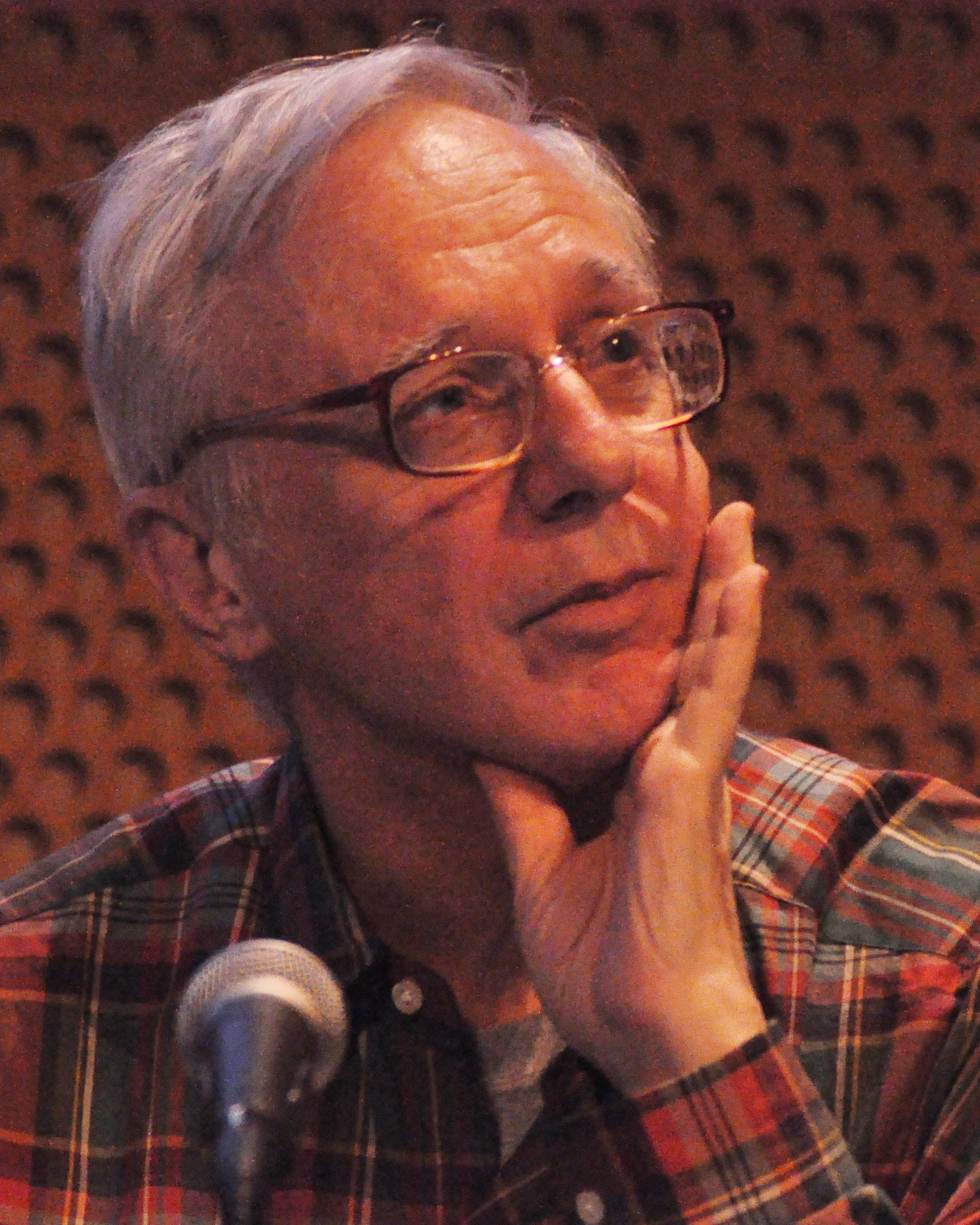
Christgau in 2010

In 1987, music journalist Robert Christgau in his Pazz & Jop annual poll in the Village Voice used the term "pigfucker" to label the music of early Sonic Youth. He referred to them as "the old farts of pigfuckerdom" along with Big Black as the "young farts of pigfuckerdom". The term "pigfucker" later evolved into the label "pigfuck" which began to be used as a description for noise rock and post-hardcore bands in the late 1980s associated with the independent record labels Touch and Go and Amphetamine Reptile.

Pigfuck has been described as a musical subgenre. According to writer Stephen Slaybaugh, the genre was characterized by "elevated decibel levels, frayed sonics, and often salacious subject matter". While writer JR Moores, noted that pigfuck had been a synonym for noise rock. According to Ivan Kreilkamp writing for Spin, pigfuck acts "used obscenity and noise as tools to nobly rip apart and revitalize the American rock counterculture".

== History ==
=== Origins: 1980s–1990s ===
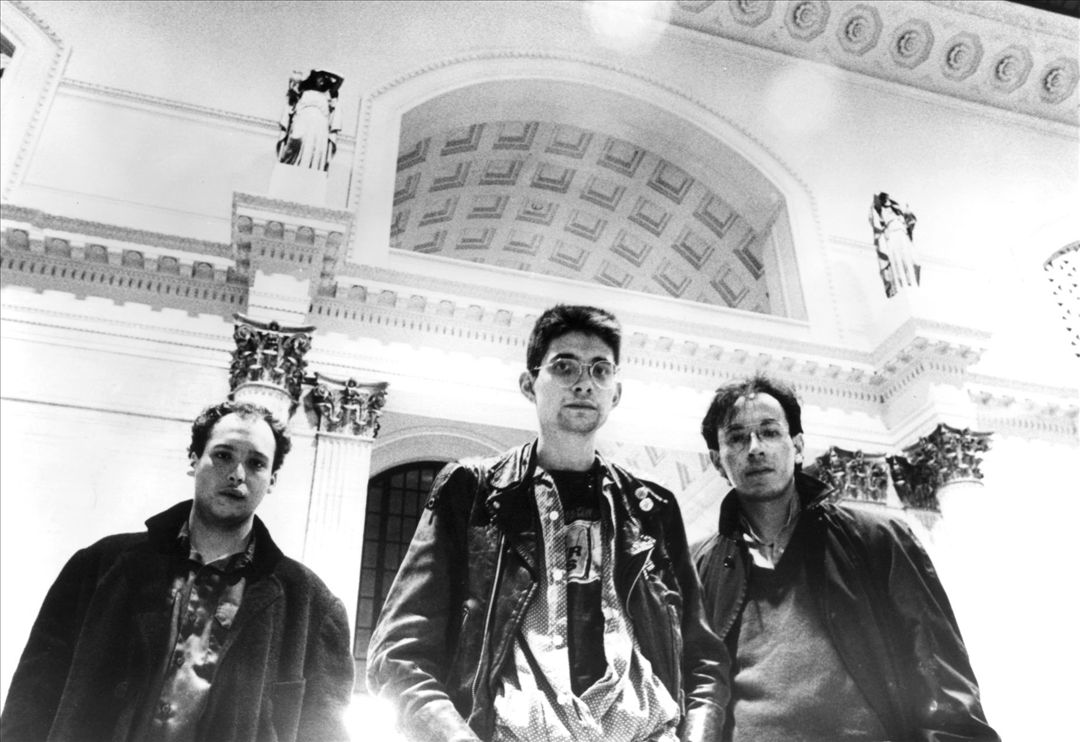
Big Black at Chicago's Union Station in 1986; left to right: Riley, Albini, and Durango

Nick Cave's group the Birthday Party has been cited as an early influence on the pigfuck sound. While Pitchfork referred to Swans' Michael Gira as a "proto-pigfucker". The Quietus, referred to Flipper's "Sex Bomb" as "proto-pigfuck". After Robert Christgau coined the term to deride the music of Sonic Youth, various acts embraced the moniker. Steve Albini is noted as part of the movement. According to the New Yorker, Albini's noise rock band Big Black exemplified the style, with Spin noting that albums such as Atomizer inspired the coinage. Pitchfork noted that Albini's project Shellac aimed to one-up the several pigfuck acts that he inspired. Other artists considered part of the pigfuck movement include Scratch Acid, Pussy Galore, Killdozer, Butthole Surfers, Cows, Cherubs, the Jesus Lizard, and Flipper.

=== 2000s–2020s ===
During the 2010s, acts such as Pissed Jeans were described as "nu-pigfuck", while Pop. 1280 was labelled by Treble as "breathing new life" into the pigfuck movement. The noise rock band Chat Pile have been described as pigfuck. Other acts include Nerver, Intercourse, Tunic, and Couch Slut.

== See also ==
- Sludge metal
