= Eat Skull =

American lo-fi indie rock band

Eat Skull is an American lo-fi indie rock band. They are based in Portland, Oregon.

== Albums ==
- III (Woodsist, 2013)
- Wild and Inside (Siltbreeze, 2009)
- Sick to Death (Siltbreeze, 2008)
