= Bloghouse =

Music genre

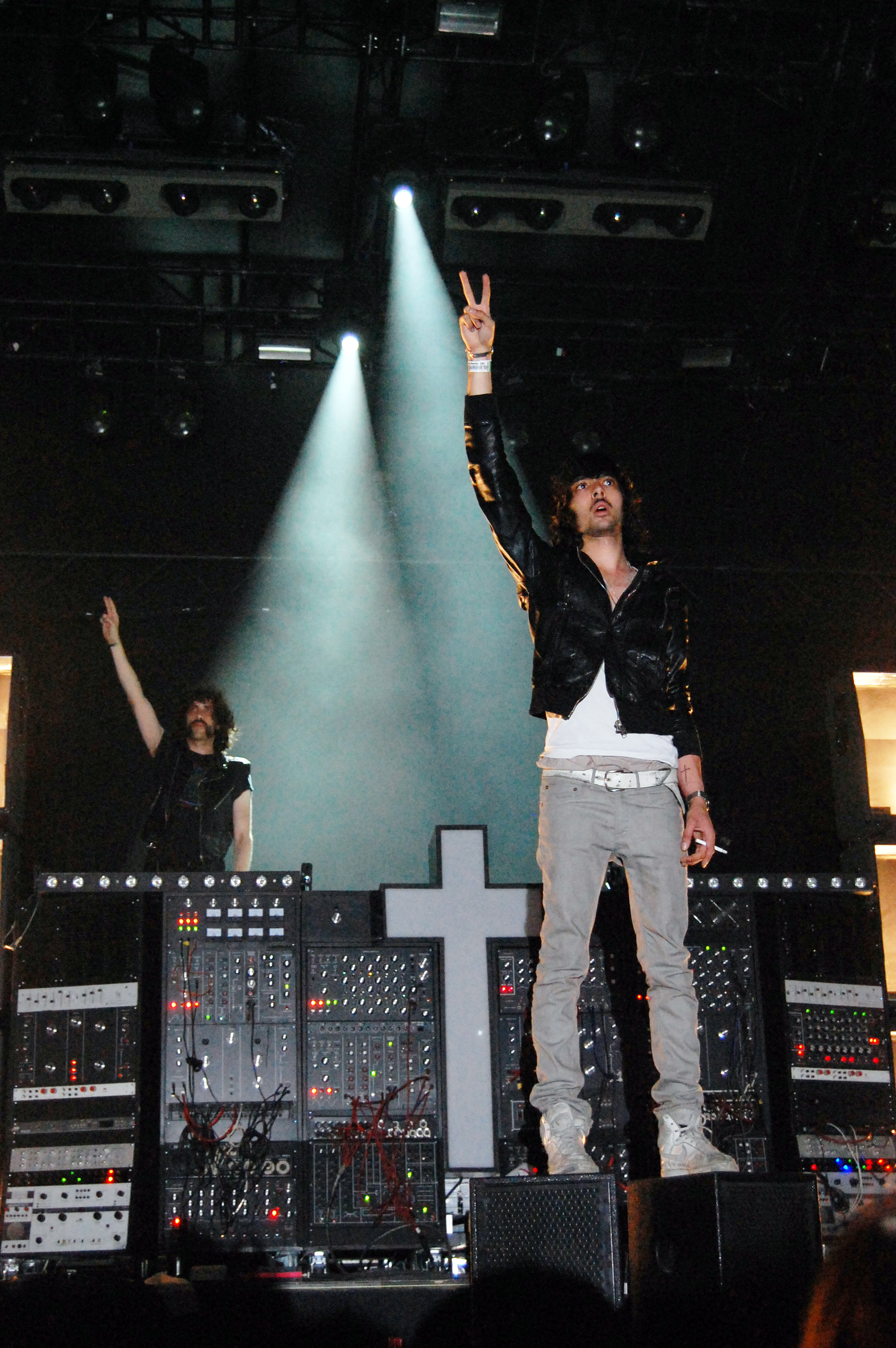
- Justice performing at Rock Werchter, 2008.
- Other names: Bloghaus; blog house; dirty electro house
- Stylistic origins: French touch; electropop; house music; electroclash; new wave; nu rave; nu disco; electro house; electro hop; balearic beat; electro dance; indie rock revival
- Cultural origins: Early 2000s, United States

Other topics
- Indie sleaze; blog rock; blogosphere; microgenres; hyperpop; blog rap; blogspot scene; Internet music

Bloghouse (also known as bloghaus) is a loosely defined scene and microgenre of house and electronic dance music that rose to prominence during the early 2000s. Initially emerging on the Internet, similarly to other early blog-related music scenes such as blog rock and blog rap. The style was characterized by its fusion of electroclash, house music, nu rave, electro house, electro dance, electro hop, nu-disco, French touch, new wave, and indie rock aesthetics.

The scene originally emerged from the early online musical blogosphere, with music being distributed through MP3 blogs, like Hype Machine and Hipster Runoff, as well as early social media platforms such as Myspace.

The bloghouse era went on to become an influence on the hyperpop movement, as well as an inspiration for the "indie sleaze" aesthetic, which was coined in 2021, to refer to the fashion and visual style of bloghouse-related artists alongside various other 2000s alternative music scenes. Notable acts include Justice, Crystal Castles, Uffie, Mstrkrft, Simian Mobile Disco, and Boys Noize.

== Etymology ==
The term "bloghouse" was originally defined by Carles, the anonymous writer behind the music and culture blog, Hipster Runoff. He used the term in a post titled "WTF is Blog House?", published on July 10, 2008, to describe several prominent electronica-related acts that were being described as "bloghouse". In the article Carles, listed several artists as part of the bloghouse umbrella, including prominent acts like Justice and Crystal Castles, alongside artists that would later be more closely associated with the blog rock movement, such as Black Kids. Artists like Interpol from New York's post-punk revival scene were also mentioned. Over time, the sound of bloghouse became more narrowly defined, describing a proliferation of electronic music artists that were associated with the early online musical blogosphere.

== Characteristics ==
Bloghouse has been described as a microgenre. At the time, bloghouse artists gained popularity primarily through the early stages of online music discussion on MP3 blogs and websites like Hype Machine, Music for Robots and Blogspot. In 2021, author Lina Abascal defined the bloghouse era as being:

[...] simultaneously a party scene, a fashion trend and an all-encompassing lifestyle centered on a "very certain kind of dance music," per Abascal. Lasting from roughly 2006 to 2011, there isn't a particular sound or sonic signature unique to the genre since you could, technically, classify different bloghouse songs and artists as everything from French touch to nü rave to electroclash.

Bloghouse was defined not by sound but by distribution. Rather than relying on traditional labels, tracks were shared by independent music bloggers, frequently using platforms like Blogspot paired with file-hosting services like MediaFire or zShare. Listeners now learned about new artists through blogs before encountering them in clubs or at shows. Promoters booked acts based on online attention. Chromeo’s Dave 1 stated: "It was Billboard versus Hype Machine: the mainstream press covered them, the blogs covered us".

== History ==
=== 2000s: Origins ===
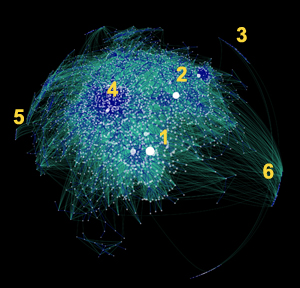
An artist's depiction of the interconnections between blogs and blog authors in the "blogosphere" in 2007

During the early to mid‑2000s, the widespread adoption of home computers and dial-up internet contributed to a new form of musical distribution, music blogs. By 2003, nearly 60% of Americans had internet access, compared to just 40% in 2000. Bloggers began to post daily streams of new tracks on sites like Hype Machine.

In 2004, photographer Mark Hunter launched a party blog known as "Polaroid Scene", which posted photos of late-night parties, It girls such as Cory Kennedy. The site allowed anyone on the internet to have access to the emerging hipster subculture. Hunter later changed the name of his website to "thecobrasnake.com" after receiving a cease and desist letter from Polaroid. The website was later retroactively described as "Instagram before Instagram".

== Revival ==
During the late 2010s to early 2020s, the bloghouse era became an influence on hyperpop artists such as SOPHIE and Charli XCX, alongside artists associated with the emerging indie sleaze revival, such as the Hellp, Snow Strippers and the Dare. Dua Lipa's 2019 track "Don't Start Now" has been described as "bloghouse-esque", while artist Grace Ives was labelled a "bloghouse revivalist".

Bloghouse and its social media subculture has been credited by David Grellier (of College and Valerie) as a formative influence on synthwave via Grellier himself, Maethelvin, Anoraak and others.

Additionally, the bloghouse era has been recognized as an influence on the 2020s underground rap scene, with Pitchfork describing rapper Fakemink's 2025 single "Easter Pink" as "Bloghouse meets cloud rap". While bloghouse has been described as a precursor to online distribution-based music scenes like "SoundCloud rap".

== See also ==
- Streaming service
