= The Wrong Ferarri =

- Directed by: Adam Green
- Written by: Adam Green
- Produced by: Adam Green
- Starring: Adam Green; Macaulay Culkin; Jack Dishel; Chris Egan; Cory Kennedy; Illyse Singer
- Cinematography: Toby Goodshank
- Edited by: Casey Holford; Adam Green
- Release date: April 4, 2011 (Anthology Film Archives)
- Running time: 73 minutes
- Country: United States
- Language: English

The Wrong Ferarri is a 2010 American comedy-drama film written and directed by Adam Green. Conceived on Green's European music tour in the summer of 2010, the film was shot entirely on an iPhone camera, with Green writing the script for the actors on index cards. Scenes were shot in France, Prague, Venice, The Jersey Shore and New York City. Green has stated that The Wrong Ferarri was inspired by Woody Allen's Bananas, Alejandro Jodorowsky's The Holy Mountain, "Weird Al" Yankovic's UHF, Robert Downey, Sr.'s Putney Swope and the television show Seinfeld. The film contains strong profanity, sexual themes, and several scenes of nudity and is unrated by the MPAA. The film's title was intentionally misspelled.

== Premise ==
The plot follows four of Greenster's love affairs, life as a video game character and the use of the hallucinogen ketamine. The film is structured as a series of sketches with Dadaist dialogue, and does not follow a continuous plot.

== Cast ==
- Adam Green as Greenster
  - BP Fallon as Old Greenster
- Jack Dishel
- Chris Egan
- Jon Wiley
- Larissa Brown
- Cory Kennedy
- Dev Hynes
- Illyse Singer
- Macaulay Culkin
- Devendra Banhart
- The Shining Twins
- Isabelle McNally
- Pete Doherty
- Har Mar Superstar
- Omer Shemesh
- Steve Mertens
- Lindsay Hogan
- Alia Shawkat
- Aris Shwab
- Jeffrey Lewis
- Xan Aird
- Binki Shapiro
- Francesco Mandelli
- Danielle Johnson
- Sky Ferreira
- Matt Romano
- Leah Green
- Toby Goodshank
- Dashan Coram
- Julie LaMendola
- Johnny Dydo
- Aleksa Palladino
- Mick Whitnail
- Alexandra Costin
- Seth Faergolzia
- Tobias G. Rylander
- Parker Kindred
- Evan Dando (voicework)
- Donald Cumming (voicework)

== Release ==
The Wrong Ferarri was first released online as a free download. On April 4, 2011, the film premiered at Anthology Film Archives in New York City.
