= Riviera (The Hellp album) =

Studio album by The Hellp
- Released: November 21, 2025
- Length: 37:02
- Labels: Anemoia; Atlantic
- Producers: Noah Dillon; Chandler Lucy; Trayer Tryon

The Hellp chronology
LL Revisited (2025)	Riviera (2025)

Singles from Riviera
- 1. "Country Road" Released: September 11, 2025; 2. "Doppler" Released: October 3, 2025; 3. "Here I Am" Released: October 17, 2025

Riviera is the third (Note: While this album is advertised by the Hellp as their second, and is their second under a record label, it is technically their third studio album counting their since-removed 2016 debut album Twin Sinner.) studio album by American band the Hellp. It was released on November 21, 2025, through Atlantic Records under the imprint Anemoia Records. It was preceded by the singles "Country Road", "Doppler", and "Here I Am".

== Background ==
The Hellp released their second studio album and major-label debut, LL, in October 2024, followed by a companion EP titled LL Revisited in April 2025. On September 9, 2025, they announced that their third studio album would be titled Riviera, and would be released in October of that year. Two days later, on September 11, they released the album's first single, "Country Road". The song was described by Russell Falcon of KTLA as a "dusky and introspective sonic left turn". The album's second single, "Doppler", was released on October 3. The Face highlighted the song's "melancholic" lyrics about "love, lust and heartache", with "muffled acoustic guitars [giving] way to rising, euphoric synths". The album's third single, "Here I Am", was released on October 17. Russell Falcon of KTLA described the song as a "jaunty and confident mid-tempo track", calling it a "stunner". The album ultimately did not release in October as originally planned, though on November 4, it was announced that the album would officially be released on November 21.

A music video for the album's closing track, "Live Forever", was released alongside the album on November 21. A music video for "New Wave America" was released on December 4. A music video for "Revenge of the Mouse Diva" was released on January 13, 2026, though it was unlisted shortly after being uploaded.

== Critical reception ==
Professional ratings
Review scores
Source	Rating
Clash	8/10
The Harvard Crimson	4.5/5 stars
KTLA	8/10
The Needle Drop	5/10
NME	4/5 stars
Pitchfork	7.4/10

Riviera received positive reviews from critics. Lydia Wei of Pitchfork described the album as "scuzzy, brooding, and obsessed with open roads and Californian archetypes", as well as being "a clearer definition of the Hellp’s own vision". Wei highlighted "Moog-style synths [twinkling] like intermittent neon signs spotted from the highway" on "Cortt", and described the chorus on "Here I Am" as "braindead yet deliriously addictive". Wei also found "Meridian" to be a standout, highlighting its "unexpectedly earnest, saccharine pop-rock chorus". However, she was slightly critical of "Doppler", finding it to be "so muted and lowkey you fear it could put someone to sleep behind the wheel".

Georgia Evans of NME highlighted "cinematic electronics" as well as the Hellp's "knowing, self-aware swagger" on the album, overall describing it as "Dillon and Lucy walking a tightrope between persona and vulnerability". She described "Country Road" as having a "sense of desperate isolation", while finding "New Wave America" and "Cortt" to "widen the album’s sense of spaciousness". She also found "Doppler" to be a "glimmer of hope" within the album, and highlighted a "slow-burning maturity" on the closing track, "Live Forever".

James Mellen of Clash compared "Live Forever" to the band's viral track "Ssx", finding that the two share a similar "evocative and sentimental nature". Mellen also described an "anxious piano motif slowly culminating in a sober pop-rock chorus" on "Meridian", and called the song a "true highlight" for the band.

Anthony Fantano of The Needle Drop was more critical in his review of the album. While he enjoyed the "chill beats and cerebral lead vocals" as well as the lyrics on "Country Road", and found "Pray to Evil" to have the most "hit potential" out of every song on the album, overall he found the quality on Riviera to be "very middle of the road". He criticized the lyrics on "Modern Man", finding them to sound "weirdly off the cuff", and also found "Live Forever" to "[fail] to muster up a recognizable or memorable hook" despite its repetition. He was also critical of "Meridian", describing it as having "a lot of different ideas and it's not really sure which one of them it wants to do", and called the track's vision and progression "a complete mess". Despite these criticisms, however, he did find the album to show some potential.

== Track listing ==
Riviera track listing
No.	Title	Writer(s)	Producer(s)	Length
1.	"Revenge of the Mouse Diva"	Noah Patrick Dillon; Chandler Ransom Lucy; Rowan Auckland; Maxwell Mohatt; Trayer Clancy Tryon	Dillon; Lucy; Auckland; Mohatt; Tryon	3:25
2.	"Country Road"	Dillon; Lucy; Maggie Cnossen; Tryon	Dillon; Lucy; Gavin Bennett; Tom Krell; Tryon; Liam Hall^{[v]}	3:24
3.	"Pray to Evil"	Dillon; Lucy; Cnossen; Tryon	Dillon; Lucy; Tryon	3:10
4.	"Meridian"	Dillon; Lucy; Tryon	Dillon; Lucy; Tryon	4:33
5.	"New Wave America"	Dillon; Lucy; Jacob Taff; Tryon	Dillon; Lucy; Taff; Tryon	3:08
6.	"Cortt"	Dillon; Lucy; Cnossen; Tryon	Dillon; Lucy; Tryon; Hall^{[v]}	4:11
7.	"Modern Man"	Dillon; Lucy; Tryon	Dillon; Lucy; Tryon	3:10
8.	"Doppler"	Dillon; Lucy; Tryon	Dillon; Lucy; Tryon	3:17
9.	"Here I Am"	Dillon; Lucy; Cnossen; Tryon	Dillon; Lucy; Tryon	3:46
10.	"Live Forever"	Dillon; Lucy; Cnossen; Tryon	Dillon; Lucy; Tryon	4:58
Total length:				37:02

=== Note ===
- ^{^[v]} indicates a vocal producer.

== Personnel ==
Credits adapted from Tidal.

=== The Hellp ===
- Noah Dillon – programming
- Chandler Lucy – programming

=== Additional contributors ===
- Trayer Tryon – mixing
- Alec Ness – mastering
- Tom Krell – production supervision
- Maggie Cnossen – additional vocals on "Country Road"
