= Audioblog =

Audioblog is a blog with vocal recordings as its central part, and may refer to:

- Podcast, a type of digital media consisting of an episodic series of files (either audio or video) subscribed to and downloaded through web syndication
- MP3 blog or musicblog, through which music files are made available for download
