= Adam Green (musician) =

American singer-songwriter

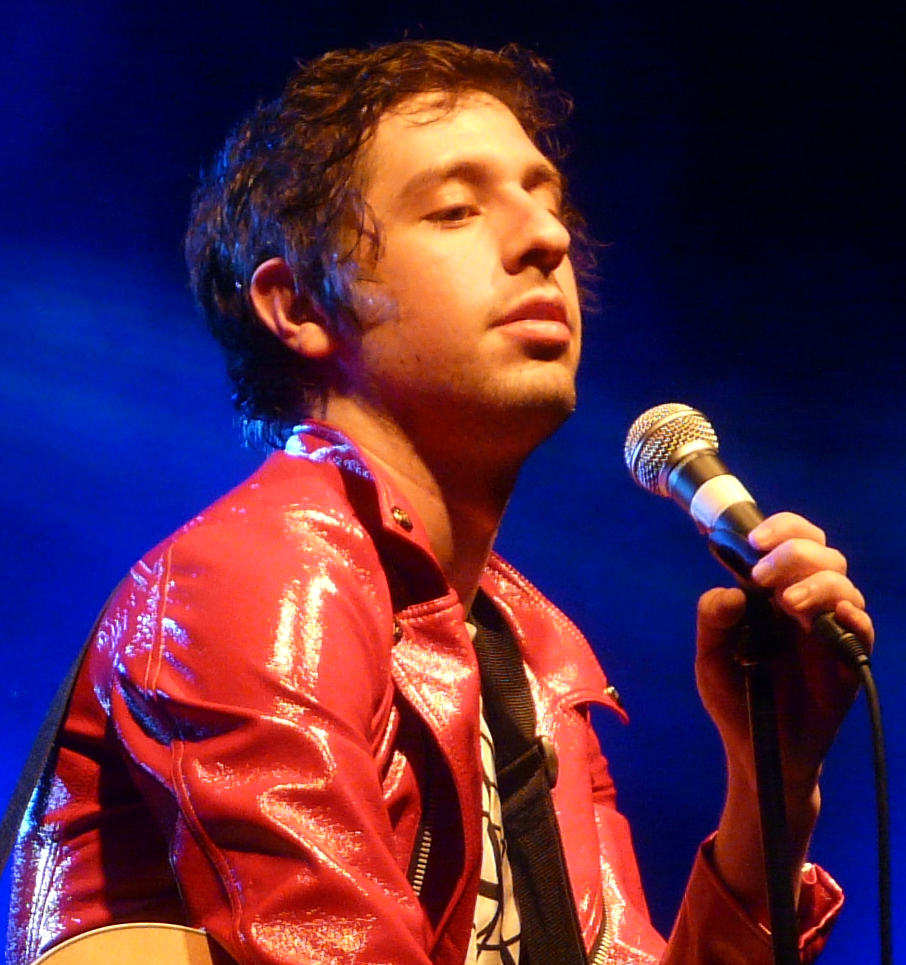
- Green onstage in 2008

Background information
- Born: May 28, 1981 (age 45); Mount Kisco, New York U.S.
- Genres: Indie rock; anti-folk; indie folk
- Occupation: Singer-songwriter
- Instruments: vocals, guitar, harmonica, keyboards, piano, tuba
- Years active: 1998–present
- Website: www.adamgreen.net

Adam Green (born May 28, 1981) is an American singer-songwriter, artist and filmmaker.

Green is well known for his involvement in the anti-folk music movement and as one half of the band the Moldy Peaches, alongside fellow singer-songwriter Kimya Dawson. Green has found success as a solo artist, enjoying increasing popularity in the United States as well as a number of European countries, particularly Germany.

== Career ==
=== Music ===
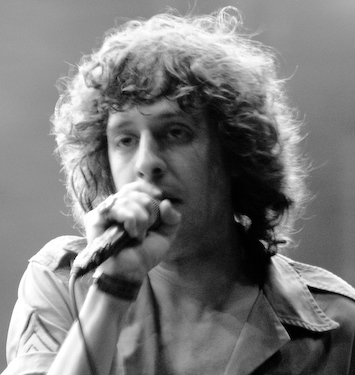
Green in 2010

Green attended Emerson College for one semester in 1998 before leaving to concentrate on his music, going on to co-found the Moldy Peaches with Kimya Dawson. In 2002, the Moldy Peaches went on hiatus, and both Green and Dawson embarked on solo careers.

Green released several albums on Rough Trade Records. Among his better known songs are "Jessica" (about singer Jessica Simpson), "Novotel", "Friends of Mine", "Dance with Me", "Carolina" and "Emily", and in the UK, his cover of The Libertines track "What a Waster". "Jessica" (#63, 2004) and "Emily" (#53, 2005) both appeared in the UK Singles Chart.

Prior to Jacket Full of Danger in 2006, all of Green's albums had been released on the 22nd of the month.

In January 2008, the Moldy Peaches began having a resurgence in popularity, due to their music being included in the hit indie film, Juno. Most notably, a duet between Green and Dawson, the Moldy Peaches song "Anyone Else But You" was featured in the film, and also in a scene which featured the film's lead actors, Michael Cera and Elliot Page performing the song together. The soundtrack album reached No. 1 on the Billboard 200 chart on its third week of release.

In January 2010, Green released his sixth solo album, Minor Love, which was a slight departure from his previous works. Green says he wrote many of these songs in a clearer style so they were easier for the listener to understand. He also says the album was slightly more produced, creating a more offsetting sound, rather than being raw, and simple like his earlier work. Later in 2010, he also released another album, Musik for a Play, which was a collection of instrumentals made for a play soundtrack. For his next album, Green expressed interest in making a heavy metal-like album.

Following the release of these albums, Green took time off from making music, and focused his work as an artist and filmmaker. But he still performed during this time, even doing some shows with singer Binki Shapiro. In 2012, Green made references to an upcoming duet album with Shapiro, which was eventually announced in October 2012 on Green's website. The song "Here I Am" from the album was also made available for download online. The album was released on January 29, 2013. Green is recording his next album, the soundtrack to his film Aladdin.

In September 2019 Green released the album "Engine of Paradise" via Danger Mouse's record label 30th Century Records.

=== Art ===
In 2005, Green entered the professional art world with his exhibition of a series of drawings titled "Animal Dreams" at Loyal Gallery in Stockholm. Green's art exhibition "Teen Tech" was displayed at New York's Morrison Hotel Gallery for 10 days in April 2010 and consisting of twelve plaster sculptures, eighteen watercolor and acrylic large-scale (30" x 40") paintings, nineteen drawings, twenty collages and papier-mâché and mixed-material works. A portion of "Teen Tech's" proceeds went to benefit Artists for Peace and Justice, an effort to re-create and cultivate sustainability in Haiti. On June 9, 2012 Green's exhibition "Cartoon & Complaint" opened at Dustin Yellin's art center and gallery The Intercourse in Red Hook, Brooklyn. In August 2012 The Hole Gallery in New York City announced that it would be showing a summer exhibition of Green's work titled "Houseface", a collection of works inspired by De Stijl and the architecture of Friedensreich Hundertwasser and Antoni Gaudí. Green's Houseface paintings and sculptures were featured in a Stuart Weitzman shoe advertisement directed by James Franco entitled "Walking After Midnight". Afterwards he formed an art collective named 3MB with Macaulay Culkin and Toby Goodshank. Their first exhibit Leisure Inferno opened at Le Poisson Rouge Gallery in October 2012. Green kicked off 2013 with "Medieval Businessmen," an exhibit of drawings and paintings at Loyal Gallery in Sweden. In July he showed his visual art for the first time in Italy with "The Yellow Show", a solo-exhibition that opened at Motel Salieri in Rome. The next month he had a show in Zurich with "From A Darker Time," a show composed of older works. In September 2013 Green took part in a collaborative artshow with Pete Doherty and Fionn Regan entitled "Noise Kids. In November Green exhibited in Vienna at the Viertelneun Gallery showing "A Land Recombined". His most recent show was at The Hole Gallery for his show "Hot Chicks".

=== Film ===
On April 4, 2011, Green released his first film, entitled The Wrong Ferarri. The project, shot entirely on iPhone, was written, directed, and performed in by Green who claims to have conceived it under the influence of ketamine. Others appearing in the film included BP Fallon, Alia Shawkat, Devendra Banhart, Pete Doherty, Dev Hynes, Jeffrey Lewis, Sky Ferreira, Cory Kennedy and Macaulay Culkin.

In August 2013, Green announced that his next film would be a version of Aladdin, entitled Adam Green's Aladdin. The film was successfully crowdfunded through Kickstarter in the spring of 2014. Filmed largely over the summer of 2014.

== Personal life ==
Although Green was brought up in a secular Jewish home, his grandparents were very religious. His great-grandmother, Felice Bauer, was engaged to Franz Kafka; her family fled the Nazis in the late 1930s and relocated to New York.

Green's brother Joel, an astronomer, has appeared as an accompanying musician on several recordings.

Green was married on July 4, 2013, to Yasmin Dolatabadi. They have two daughters.

Green is a friend of the musician Carl Barât, appearing in a documentary with him in 2005. It followed the pair on a night out in London, for the European television culture channel Arte.

== Discography ==
=== Albums ===
- Garfield (October 22, 2002)
- Friends of Mine (July 22, 2003)
- Gemstones (January 10, 2005)
- Jacket Full of Danger (April 24, 2006)
- Sixes & Sevens (March 7, 2008)
- Minor Love (January 11, 2010)
- MusiK for a Play (May 10, 2010)
- Adam Green & Binki Shapiro (January 29, 2013)
- Aladdin (April 29, 2016)
- Engine of Paradise (September 6, 2019)
- That Fucking Feeling (April 14, 2022)
- Chop off Heads With Me (January 22, 2026)

=== Singles ===
- "Baby's Gonna Die Tonight" (Promo 2002)
- "Dance With Me" (2002)
- "Jessica" (2003)
- "Friends Of Mine" (2004)
- "Emily" (2005)
- "Carolina" (2005)
- "Nat King Cole" (2006)
- "Novotel" (Promo 2006)
- "Morning After Midnight" (Promo / Download 2008)
- "Twee Twee Dee" (Promo / Download 2008)
- "What Makes Him Act so Bad" (Promo / Download 2009)
- "Buddy Bradley" (Promo /Download 2010)
- "Superstar Blues" (Digital 2016)
- "Buddy Bradley" (Promo /Download 2016)
- "Freeze My Love" (Promo /Download/ Digital 2019)
- "Cheating on a Stranger" (Promo /Download/ Digital 2019)

=== Collaborations and compilations ===
- "Never My Love" with Har Mar Superstar (appears on Whip It, 2009)
- "Lady Boy" with The Paddingtons (appears on The Lady Boy Tapes, 2010)

== Books ==
- Adam Green: Magazine. Frankfurt: Suhrkamp Verlag, 2005, ISBN 3-518-12405-6

== Films ==
- The Wrong Ferarri – directed by Green, released in 2011
- Adam Green's Aladdin – directed by Green, released in 2016
