= Noah Dillon =

American artist and musician (born 1994)

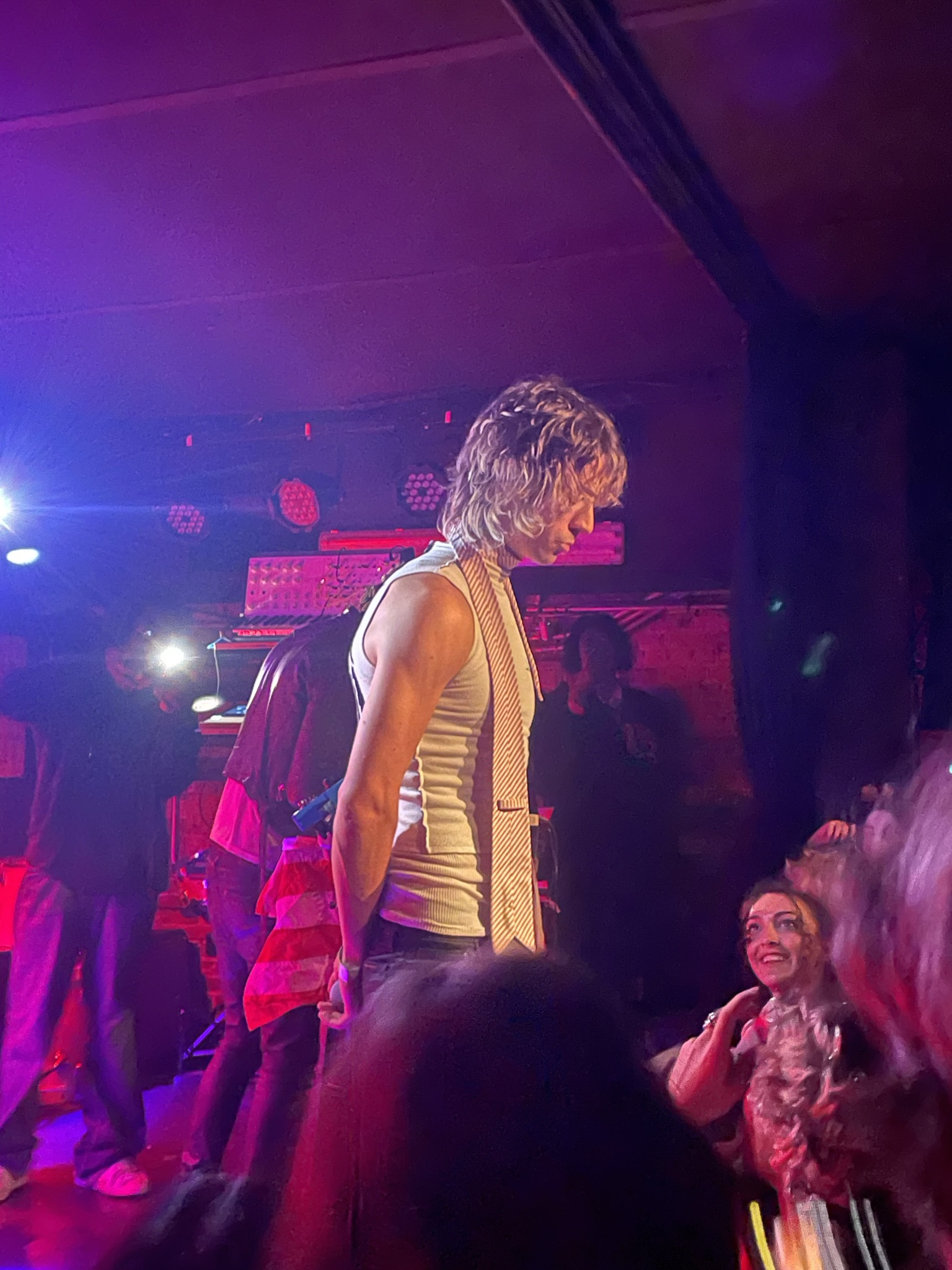
- Dillon onstage at a Hellp concert in New York City, 2021
- Born: August 2, 1994 (age 32); Durango, Colorado, United States
- Education: Fort Lewis College
- Occupations: Artist; photographer; director; musician
- Years active: 2014-present
- Known for: The Hellp
- Website: https://noahpdillon.com

Noah Patrick Dillon (born August 2, 1994) is an American artist, photographer, director and musician. He is based in Los Angeles and is the founding member of the band The Hellp. He also founded a now-defunct art collective called Hot Mess with actor and model Luka Sabbat.

== Early life and education ==
Dillon was born in Durango, Colorado. His father, Patrick Dillon, is a professional photographer who notably 'helped out' with some shots from The Hellp's Colorado music video. He later attended Fort Lewis College, where he majored in physiology and minored in education. He worked as a substitute teacher at his local high school in Colorado while working with Sabbat on Hot Mess.

== Career ==
=== Photography ===
On February 27, 2020, Dillon was hosted by the Poynter Fellowship at Yale University for a lecture titled "Images from the Void" where he speaks about authenticity in art. In June 2021, he photographed the artwork for The Marías' album Cinema. In 2022, Dillon released a photo book titled "Blust Vol. 1" that contains 174 photographs depicting the street style of Los Angeles. In October 2022, Dillon photographed Nicolas Cage and his wife Riko Shibata for the cover of Flaunt Magazine. In August 2023, Dillon photographed musician Yves Tumor for the cover of Alternative Press' fall 2023 issue.

That same year, he photographed Spanish artist Rosalía for her album ‘Lux’, besides the cover, Dillon shot almost the entirety of visuals for the project and notably every picture on the vinyl version sleeve. In the following year, the music video for the album's single 'Sauvignon Blanc', directed by Dillon, was released.

=== Film ===
On November 6, 2016, Dillon released a documentary through his YouTube channel entitled "Chemical Sunday", depicting the struggles of four Navajo residents of Gallup, New Mexico. The documentary was accompanied by an essay by Dillon in Dazed. In September 2019, Dillon directed the music video for Ryan Beatty's "Dark Circles". In April 2022, Dillon shot a fashion film for Le Père's Spring 2022 collection. In October 2024, Dillon directed the music video for Ian and Chief Keef's song Sh*t Sad. In 2025, he directed the music video for 2hollis' song Flash. In 2026 the music video for ROSALÍA's song Sauvignon Blanc, directed by Dillon, was released.

=== Art ===
==== Solo work ====
In 2023, Pio Pico Gallery in Los Angeles held an exhibition of Dillon's works titled "New Works".

==== Hot Mess ====
In 2016, Virgil Abloh commissioned Dillon and Sabbat to create a book for his brand Off-White entitled "WOMAN". In 2017, Milk Gallery commissioned Dillon and Sabbat to create 250 pieces of multimedia artwork for New York Fashion Week. The artworks were exhibited alongside poems written by Hot Mess member and author Curtis Eggleston. Dillon and Sabbat later collaborated with SSENSE to release a collection of clothing. In 2021, Los Angeles boutique and gallery Terminal 27 held an exhibition titled "Surfaces" containing works of Dillon and Sabbat.

=== The Hellp ===
Dillon formed a band called The Hellp with Eddie Liaboh and Devin Finucane while living in Durango in 2015. In February 2016, they released their debut album Twin Sinner. In 2021, the band signed to Terrible Records, under which they released their EP Enemy. In 2023, the band was signed to Atlantic Records under the imprint Anemoia. On October 25, 2024, they released their sophomore album LL. On November 21st, 2025, they released their third album, Riviera.
