= Indie sleaze =

Late 2000s-early 2010s aesthetic trend

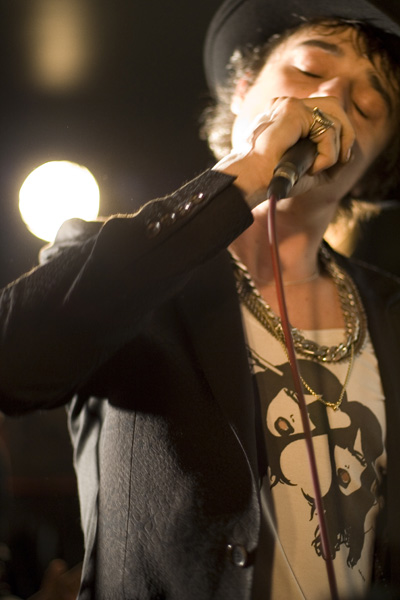
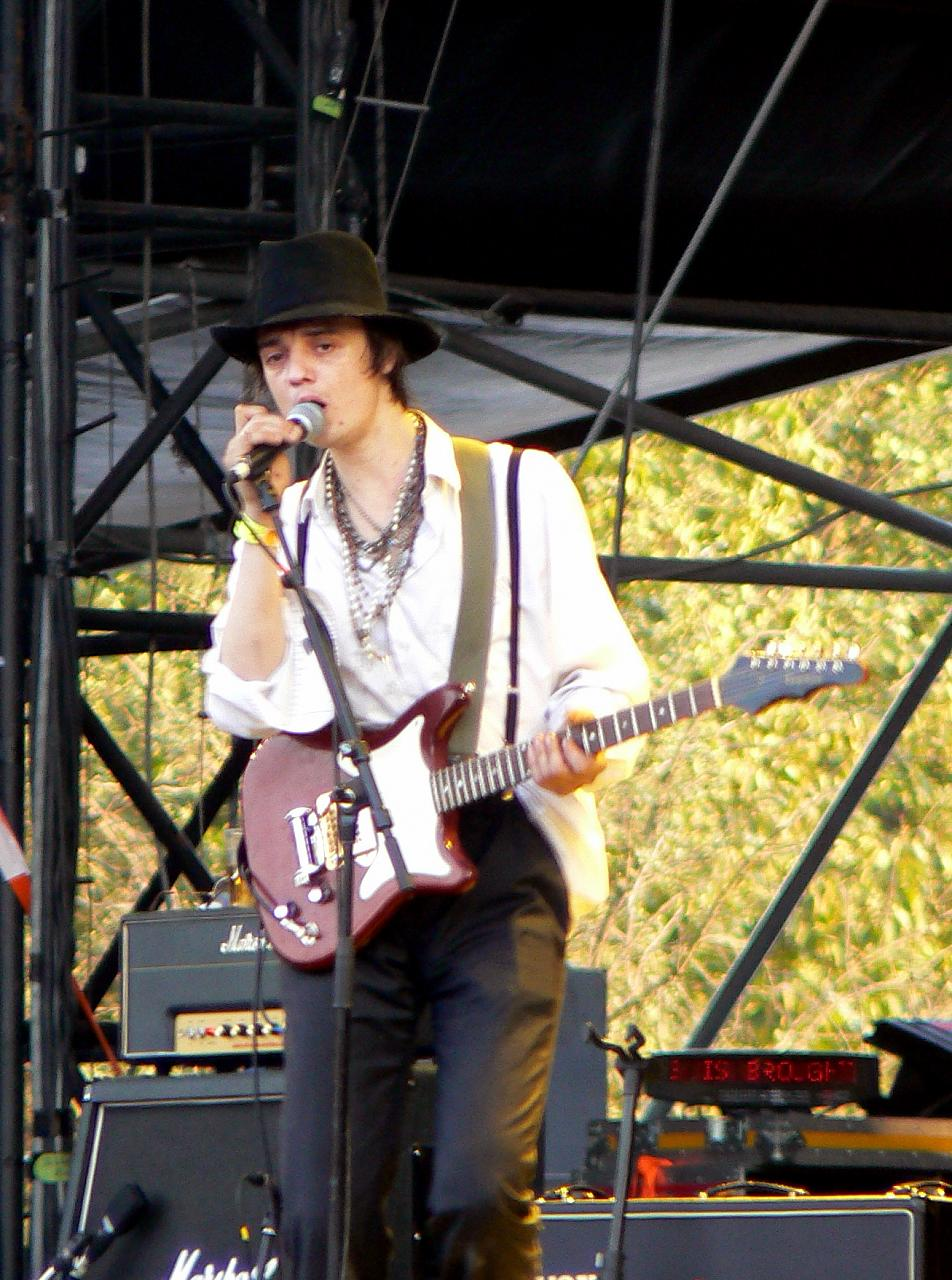
According to GQ Magazine, English musician Pete Doherty is often dubbed "the original indie sleaze pin-up."

Indie sleaze is a fashion style that was popular in the United States and United Kingdom from approximately 2006 to 2012. Characterised by an affordable, messy and lethargic take on vintage fashion styles, especially the 1970s, the style was particularly popular amongst the hipster subculture and indie rock bands. During the 2000s, the style was largely referred to as simply indie style or hipster style. Around 2016, online Facebook groups had coined the term indie über-sleaze, shortened to simply indie sleaze in 2021 by Olivia V.

Originating in the late 1990s and early 2000s amongst New York City's post-punk revival scene, which encompassed bands like the Strokes, Yeah Yeah Yeahs and Interpol, the style began as a way for bands to visually reference the 1960s and 1970s artists they were musically influenced by. In the following years, the style was adopted by English musicians, models and internet personalities including Pete Doherty, Alexa Chung, Kate Moss and Agyness Deyn, who brought it into mainstream popularity while expanding it into a more maximalist form which also embraced elements of 1980s and 1990s fashion. During this time, it was embraced by the British landfill indie movement and early online blogosphere-related music scenes such as blog rock and bloghouse. Indie sleaze's embrace by the mainstream in the mid-2000s has been described as an optimistic response to 9/11 and the Great Recession and led to a rise in amateur flash photography, hedonistic partying and drug use. Vice Media labeled the style an "umbrella aesthetic", as it encompassed several other fashion trends from the time, such as scene, twee, and electro-pop.

In the early 2020s, indie sleaze experienced cultural resurgence as an Internet aesthetic, becoming popular on social media platforms such as Instagram and TikTok. The revival has been credited to New York musical artists the Hellp and the Dare as well as photographer Maya Spangler. Fashion collections from Armani, Ann Demeulemeester, Roberto Cavalli and Rabanne have drawn from the aesthetic, while British rapper Phreshboyswag was credited with popularizing the style in the 2020s underground rap scene.

== Etymology ==
During the 2000s, the fashion now referred to as "indie sleaze" was largely referred to as simply "indie style" or "hipster style". GQ writer Meaghan Garvey discussed indie sleaze as being a "replacement" for the word hipster, due to the term's stigma.

The term "indie über-sleaze" was coined in 2016, when the Facebook group then-named Post-Post-Y2K posted a poll asking for suggestions for a new name for the group. During this poll, a user suggested "indie über-sleaze", which was popular in indie rock circles at the time. In 2018, Dalia Barillaro, an aesthetics documenter, created a separate Facebook group using that same name and the Consumer Aesthetics Research Institute (CARI) added the aesthetic as a category on their website. The term was inspired by indie music, the 2000s magazine Sleaze, and the Uffie lyric "I'll make your sleazy dreams come true."

The term was shortened to simply "indie sleaze" in 2021 by the Instagram account @indiesleaze, which was dedicated to the aesthetic, launched by a woman named Olivia V, who largely popularised the name. That same year CARI renamed the category on their website to simply "indie sleaze".

Vice Media writer Arielle Richards called the style an "umbrella aesthetic", encompassing a number of separate fashion trends from the time, including those of the scene, twee, and hipster subcultures, as well as the style of electro-pop musicians.

== Fashion ==
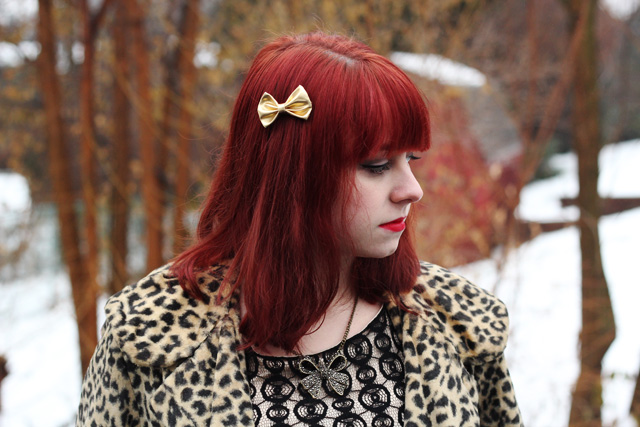
A woman in indie sleaze fashion

Indie sleaze fashion was characterized by traits of 1970s and 1980s fashion, in addition to grunge fashion, which Daniel Rodgers of Dazed described as "grubby, maximalist, and performatively vintage" and by NME's El Hunt as being defined by a sense of "chaotic spontaneity". The style was particularly popular amongst the hipster subculture. Vice's Arielle Richards described indie sleaze as a combination of other trends and styles, such as twee, scene, and electropop; NME's El Hunt wrote that indie sleaze was defined by a sense of "chaotic spontaneity".

Clothes including metallic bodysuits, studded Lita boots manufactured by shoe company Jeffrey Campbell, lamé leggings, shutter shades, ballet flats, chunky gold jewelry, tight t-shirts with ironic slogans, cropped leather jackets, striped shirts, lensless glasses, sheer tops, big belts, plaid pants, tennis skirts, high-top Converse sneakers, multiple necklaces, fedoras, the Balenciaga Motorcycle Bag, stockings with shorts, wired headphones, band T-shirts, and skinny jeans. Other elements such as galaxy prints, "Aztec" prints, side-swept bangs, "waif-thin" bodies, grown-out roots of bleached hair, smudged eyeliner, amateur flash photography, cigarettes, and drug use have been listed as hallmarks of indie sleaze. Oftentimes, clothes were bought from American Apparel.

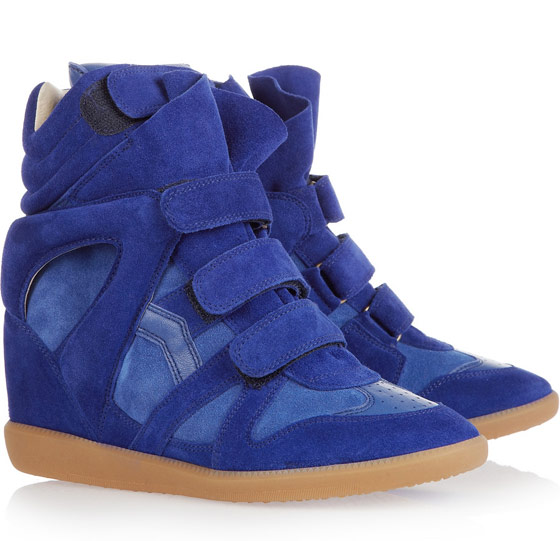
Isabel Marant Bekett Wedge sneaker

Indie sleaze is making a comeback in the fashion industry among Gen Z. Isabel Marant wedge sneakers are making a comeback. Isabel Marant collaborated with Converse to create a new wave of sneakers. In the ads, daughter of Kate Moss, Lila Moss is representing Gen Z as she walks down a cobblestone city street with loose, long hair and shredded denim, just like her mother did more than a decade ago. The fashion was commonly known as: hole-filled T-shirts, ripped tights or skinny jeans, with messy hair and make-up, which was heavily embodied by the British TV show "Skins."

== Music ==
Bands described by critics as being associated with the mid to late 2000s indie sleaze movement include the Libertines, Arctic Monkeys, the Killers, the Strokes, the Automatic, Razorlight, the Wombats, Vampire Weekend, Radiohead and Lily Allen.

Some of the most well-known indie revival acts of the early and mid-2020s are Haim, Sombr, Wet Leg, Sam Fender, Geese, the Last Dinner Party, Snow Strippers, the Dare, Jamie T, and the Hellp.

== History ==
=== 2000s–2010s: Origins ===
In the early 2000s, New York's post-punk revival scene, which included bands such as the Strokes, Yeah Yeah Yeahs and Interpol helped spark a resurgence in guitar-based indie music. This musical revival coincided with a broader cultural nostalgia for analog technology and retro aesthetics. Reflecting these influences, many of these bands adopted fashion styles reminiscent of 1960s and 1970s rock acts, such as the Velvet Underground and Television, as well as glam rock and the early New York punk scene. El País credited this style as being revived through the influence of Hedi Slimane's late 1990s designs for Yves Saint Laurent's Rive Gauche line. In a 2009 interview with GQ, the Strokes' vocalist Julian Casablancas explained their clothing style by stating:

When [the Strokes] first started playing gigs, instead of getting into a costume for the shows, we talked about how we should dress every day, in real life, like we're playing onstage, I don't care about clothes, but it's about wearing something that gives you social confidence. Or maybe helps you pick up chicks.

In the United Kingdom, this style was then adopted by indie rock musician Pete Doherty of the Libertines, alongside models Kate Moss and Agyness Deyn, as well as fashion blogger Alexa Chung, who all combined it with elements of 1980s high fashion and 1990s grunge fashion. Doherty, in particularly, has been cited by publications including Vogue, El País and Highsnobiety as the person who largely popularised indie sleaze fashion.

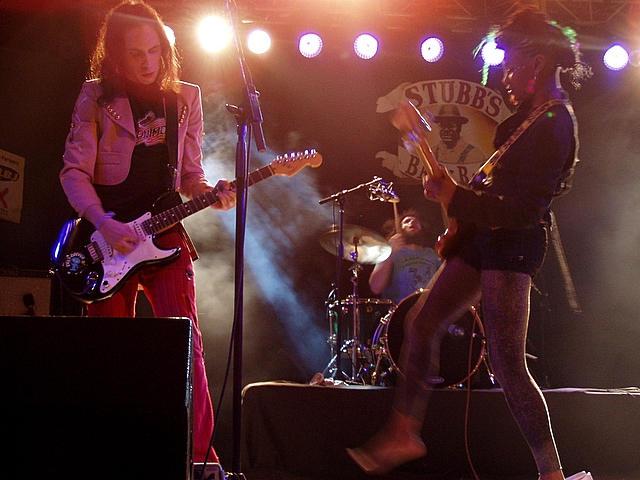
Indie rock band the Noisettes in 2006

The popularity of indie rock soon heightened with the beginning of the British landfill indie movement, as indie sleaze became embraced by the mainstream around 2006. This led to its adoption by electroclash, new rave and electronic music-influenced indie rock groups including Klaxons, Late of the Pier, MGMT, Peaches, LCD Soundsystem and Crystal Castles. As this took place, it was embraced by various celebrities and public figures, including singers M.I.A., Sky Ferreira, and Beth Ditto; photographers the Cobrasnake and Terry Richardson, actresses Mary-Kate and Ashley Olsen; designers Henry Holland and Jeremy Scott; and models Cory Kennedy, Pixie Geldof L'Officiel USA named the character Effy Stonem from the British television series Skins "the perfect representative" for [indie sleaze]. This popularity was also notably tied to the popularity of MySpace and the early days of Tumblr, where many participants posted photographs of their outfits, generally at parties.

Samantha Maxwell of Paste wrote that indie sleaze "feels like a reaction to the early years of Obama's presidency: The economy may have crashed, but there was still a sense of sparkling optimism in the air." Olivia V similarly stated that indie sleaze began before the Great Recession, allowing for a sense of optimism, while other sources linked its initial rise in the New York post-punk revival scene as an optimistic response to the September 11 attacks. Welsh singer Gwenno stated that the indie sleaze period was "very debauched, and probably the last moment where kids had been able to do whatever they want."

In the late 2000s, the soft grunge fashion style and Internet aesthetic evolved directly from the indie sleaze trend, once Tumblr users began to merge it with darker fashion elements like fishnets, chokers and combat boots.

=== 2020s: Revival ===
Beginning in 2021, the style gained a revived interest, with the popularity of the Instagram account @indiesleaze and revived discussion through TikTok. This revival was attributed by publications including Dazed and Elle to the style's affordability, carefree nature and post-pandemic partying. Searches on Google for "indie sleaze" spiked in early 2022.

Numéro had called the aesthetic the "ancestor" of the Brat style which emerged following the 2024 release of Brat by Charli XCX, as well as citing both the Dare and the Hellp as well as photographer Maya Spangler (also known as Stolenbesos) as contributors to the revival of the aesthetic in 2024. There was a 43% increase in searches for "indie sleaze" on Depop in 2024. The Spring/Summer 2025 fashion collections have also contributed to the aesthetics revival with Numéro noting the collections from Armani, Ann Demeulemeester, Roberto Cavalli and Rabanne having indie sleaze influences.

New York magazine The Fader stated that British rapper Phreshboyswag had incorporated elements of indie sleaze, while Trill magazine credited him with popularizing the aesthetic in the 2020s underground rap scene.

== Criticism ==
Arielle Richards of Vice criticized the alleged resurgence of indie sleaze as fake, writing that it was "created by a bunch of overworked millennials trawling Instagram, TikTok, and Google, in a bid to provide the winning take on something that isn't really happening." Stylist's Naomi May similarly wrote in 2022 that indie sleaze as a trend was a "myth", pointing to the retirement of key figures of indie sleaze, such as Deyn, Holland, Chung, and Doherty, and the body positivity movement as evidence. Daniel Dylan Wray of The Quietus wrote that indie sleaze itself was "contrived into existence as a genre/label" despite having "never existed to begin with", adding, "With indie sleaze, there appears to be little else going on other than some people wallowing in the past while trying to convince themselves that it, or maybe even them, possesses some sort of contemporary relevance."

== See also ==
- Heroin chic
