= Hype Machine =

Music blog aggregator

- Website type: Music Aggregator
- Available in: English
- Owner: Anthony Volodkin
- Website: http://www.hypem.com
- Commercial: Yes
- Launched: 2005
- Current status: active

Hype Machine is a music blog aggregator created by Anthony Volodkin.

== History ==
Hype Machine was originally a music database created in 2005 by Anthony Volodkin, then a sophomore computer science major at Hunter College. The site was born out of Volodkin's frustration with music magazines and radio stations. He said, "I discovered MP3 blogs like Stereogum and Music for Robots. I couldn't believe there were people spending their time writing about music, putting up tracks so you could hear them. And I thought, there has to be a way to bring this all together." In 2005, Volodkin sent his site address to pioneers in the online music domain, including Lucas Gonze of Webjay, in order to gain feedback. Instead of sending a response, Gonze and others posted the link online. Volodkin observed, "[Hype Machine] got launched without ever being launched."

In the early-to-mid 2000s, Hype Machine was one of many MP3 blogs which helped establish the development of early blogosphere-related music scenes such as blog rock, blog rap and bloghouse.

Hype Machine had an advertising partnership with BuzzMedia until 2014, when it switched to Townsquare Media.

== Site structure ==
Hype Machine's structure has been described as an "amalgamation of Pandora Radio and Pitchfork Media". It aggregates the most recently posted songs from a selection of music blogs (about 800) and lists them on the website's main page. Users have the ability to "love" songs, which saves the song to their Loved List. The site has thirteen different genres to select music from. Users can also select the "Latest" tracks from categories including "Freshest", "Remixes Only", "No Remixes", and blogs in the user's country. Hype Machine also provides a full directory of the blogs from which their database of music is derived. Additionally, Hype Machine maintains a Popular List for the last three days and the previous week, both of which are determined by the number of "loves" given to each song by users. In 2007, the site introduced the Music Blog Zeitgeist, which aggregates music bloggers' annual "Best of" lists, as well as using their own data to create lists of the top 50 artists, albums, and songs for the year. In March 2008, the site added a Listening History section, which allows users to see what songs their friends have recently listened to.

Above each song are provided links to online music retailers such as eMusic, Amazon, and iTunes, allowing users to purchase the track. The commission from each sale serves as one of the main revenue streams for Hype Machine. In January 2010, The Hype Machine partnered with SoundCloud, allowing labels to provide music bloggers with new and pre-released tracks.

== Apps ==
Hype Machine released an iPhone application on May 11, 2011, and a Blackberry 10 version in 2013.

== Reception ==
Hype Machine's traffic has grown steadily since its launch in 2005. It has been profiled by CNN, Wired, and The Guardian. It was named to The Guardian's list of 100 essential websites of 2009, one of four music-oriented sites to receive mention. Fred Wilson called the site "the best thing to happen to music since the Rolling Stones" and the "Technorati for music". Gawker Media founder Nick Denton called the site "the future of all media".
