= Musik for a Play =

MusiK for a Play

Studio album by Adam Green
- Released: May 10, 2010
- Recorded: at Threshold Studio and Dirt Floor Studio
- Genres: Anti-folk; Instrumental; Film Score
- Label: Contraphonic Records

Adam Green chronology
| Minor Love (2010) | MusiK for a Play (2010) |

MusiK for a Play is Adam Green's seventh solo record, released by Contraphonic Records on May 10, 2010 in a limited release of 500 copies. The album was written as a score for a theatrical version of Paul Auster's novel about a homeless man's dog entitled Timbuktu. The compositions of the songs on the album premiered at Zimmertheater in Tübingen, Germany. Musicians on the album include Chris Egan on percussion, Steve Mertens on bass and sitar, Dan Myers on saxophone, Jeff Pierce on trumpet, Omer Shemesh on piano and glockenspiel, David Weiss on flute and clarinet, and Jon Wiley on guitar.

== Track listing ==
1. "Gallop" - 2:23
2. "Sailor Shirts" - 1:42
3. "Big Lips" - 1:33
4. "Lazy Dog" - 1:47
5. "Twins" - 0:57
6. "Ellington" - 1:28
7. "Lasers" - 1:35
8. "Sticky Ricki" (Remix) - 1:51
9. "Ron Asheton" - 2:36
10. "Sailor Shirts" (Demo) - 2:06
11. "Big Lips" (Demo) - 1:33
12. "Gallop" (Demo) - 2:03
