= Gemstones (album) =

Studio album by Adam Green
- Released: January 10, 2005
- Studio: Dumbo Studio, New York City, NY
- Genre: Anti-folk alternative country
- Length: 31:39
- Label: Rough Trade
- Producer: Dan Myers

Adam Green chronology
| Friends of Mine (2004) | Gemstones (2005) | Jacket Full of Danger (2006) |

Professional ratings
Aggregate scores
| Source | Rating |
|---|---|
| Metacritic | 49/100 |
Review scores
| Source | Rating |
| AllMusic | 4.5/5 stars |
| Entertainment Weekly | D |
| The Guardian | 3/5 stars |
| The Irish Times | 3/5 stars |
| Mojo | 4/5 stars |
| NME | 5/10 |
| Pitchfork | 5.5/10 |
| Q | 1/5 stars |
| Rolling Stone | 2/5 stars |
| Spin | D |

Gemstones is the third solo album by American musician Adam Green. It was released on January 10, 2005 in Europe and on February 22, 2005 in the United States. The album is characterised by the heavy presence of Wurlitzer piano, whereas its predecessor relied on a string section in its instrumentation.

== Track listing ==
All tracks are written by Adam Green.

| No. | Title | Length |
|---|---|---|
| 1. | "Gemstones" | 2:24 |
| 2. | "Down on the Street" | 2:07 |
| 3. | "He's the Brat" | 2:03 |
| 4. | "Over the Sunrise" | 1:44 |
| 5. | "Crackhouse Blues" | 2:07 |
| 6. | "Before My Bedtime" | 2:40 |
| 7. | "Carolina" | 2:51 |
| 8. | "Emily" | 2:45 |
| 9. | "Who's Your Boyfriend" | 1:42 |
| 10. | "Country Road" | 2:27 |
| 11. | "Choke on a Cock" | 1:38 |
| 12. | "Bible Club" | 1:52 |
| 13. | "Chubby Princess" | 1:43 |
| 14. | "Losing on a Tuesday" | 1:46 |
| 15. | "Teddy Boys" | 1:50 |

Limited edition bonus disc
| No. | Title | Length |
|---|---|---|
| 1. | "Bible Club" (radio session) |
| 2. | "Emily" (radio session) |
| 3. | "My Shadow Tags on Behind" (radio session) |
| 4. | "Her Father and Her" (radio session) |
| 5. | "Dance with Me" (video) |
| 6. | "Baby's Gonna Die Tonight" (video) |
| 7. | "Jessica" (video) |
| 8. | "Friends of Mine" (video) |

== Personnel ==
- Adam Green – voice, guitar
- Steven Mertens – bass
- Parker Kindred – drums
- Nathan Brown – electric piano (Wurlitzer), organ
- Chis Isom – guitar
- Greg Calbi – mastering
- Dan Myers – mixing, recording
