= Jacket Full of Danger =

Studio album by Adam Green
- Released: April 24, 2006
- Genre: Anti-folk, baroque pop, blues rock
- Length: 30:22
- Label: Rough Trade
- Producer: Dan Myers

Adam Green chronology
Gemstones (2005)	Jacket Full of Danger (2006)	Sixes & Sevens (2008)

Professional ratings
Aggregate scores
Source	Rating
Metacritic	68/100 link
Review scores
Source	Rating
Allmusic	link
Pitchfork Media	(6.9/10) link
Robert Christgau	link

Jacket Full of Danger is Adam Green's fourth solo album, released in 2006. It revisits the string-laden melodrama of his second album Friends of Mine, mostly abandoning the uptempo country folk sound of his previous release, Gemstones.

Lyrically, the album explores the same mournful terrain as Gemstones with Green's familiar obsession with drugs, surrealism and failed relationships.

The album's cover art is an illustrated photograph by American artist Galen Pehrson and was featured in Artforum 10.6Vol-9UK The image depicts Green with a suite of illustrated characters, each character refers or symbolizes a social theorist, philosopher, or semiotician: Roland Barthes, Jacques Derrida, Louis Althusser, and most notable Sigmund Freud and Jacques Lacan engaged in a "dance".

In the UK, the album was preceded by the single "Nat King Cole" which also features artwork by Pehrson.

== Track listing ==
All songs written by Adam Green

1. "Pay the Toll" – 2:15
2. "Hollywood Bowl" – 1:33
3. "Vultures" – 2:02
4. "Novotel" – 1:39
5. "Party Line" – 2:17
6. "Hey Dude" – 1:39
7. "Nat King Cole" – 2:32
8. "C Birds" – 2:04
9. "Animal Dreams" – 1:48
10. "Cast a Shadow" – 1:57
11. "Drugs" – 2:03
12. "Jolly Good" – 2:01
13. "Watching Old Movies" – 2:00
14. "White Women" – 2:59
15. "Hairy Women" – 1:33

"Cast a Shadow" is an interpretation of the Beat Happening song of the same name.

== Personnel ==
- Adam Green - voice, guitar, tuba on 9
- Steven Mertens - bass except on 12, 15
- Bill Moulten - bass on 12, 15
- Joan Wasser - cello
- Parker Kindred - drums
- Chris Isom - guitar
- Emily Lazar - mastering
- Nathan Brown - organ (Wurlitzer), piano
- Dan Myers - recording, mixing
- David Gold - viola on 2
- Antoine Silverman, Lorenza Ponce - violin
- Jane Scarpantoni - violin, strings arrangement
