= Minor Love =

Studio album by Adam Green
- Released: January 11, 2010
- Genre: Anti-folk garage rock
- Label: Rough Trade
- Producer: Noah Georgeson

Adam Green chronology
Sixes & Sevens (2008)	Minor Love (2010)	Musik for a Play (2010)

Professional ratings
Aggregate scores
Source	Rating
Metacritic	70/100
Review scores
Source	Rating
AllMusic	4/5 stars
Clash	8/10 stars
Drowned in Sound	4/5 stars

Minor Love is Adam Green's sixth solo record, released by Rough Trade Records in Europe on January 8, 2010, and in the U.K. on January 11, 2010. It was released in the U.S. on February 16, 2010. The album supposedly showcases "a tender side of the often arrogant and emotionally unavailable bully/singer" and was recorded "in a total state of isolation."

== Track listing ==
1. "Breaking Locks" - 2:21
2. "Give Them a Token" - 2:13
3. "Buddy Bradley" - 2:00
4. "Goblin" - 1:50
5. "Bathing Birds" - 2:14
6. "What Makes Him Act So Bad" - 2:17
7. "Stadium Soul" - 2:34
8. "Cigarette Burns Forever" - 1:56
9. "Boss Inside" - 2:06
10. "Castles and Tassels" - 2:45
11. "Oh Shucks" - 1:58
12. "Don't Call Me Uncle" - 2:57
13. "Lockout" - 2:09
14. "You Blacken My Stay" - 2:18

== Charts ==
Chart (2010)	Peak position
German Albums Chart	48
