= You Are the Reason Tour =

2026 concert tour by Sombr

- Tour by Sombr
- Location: North America; Oceania; Europe
- Associated album: I Barely Know Her
- Start date: July 22, 2026
- End date: July 14, 2027
- Legs: 3
- No. of shows: 75
- Supporting acts: Interpol; The Last Dinner Party; Dove Cameron; Balu Brigada; Tom Odell; King Princess; The Hellp; Hannah Jadagu; Ravyn Lenae; Jessie Mazin; Suki Waterhouse
- Website: www.sombrmusic.com

Sombr concert chronology
- The Late Nights & Young Romance Tour (2025–2026); You Are the Reason Tour (2026-2027)

The You Are the Reason Tour is the ongoing second concert tour by American singer-songwriter Sombr in support of his debut studio album, I Barely Know Her (2025). It is set to begin of July 22, 2026 at the Pepsi Center WTC in Mexico City and is set to conclude on July 14, 2027 in Milan at the I-Days Festival.

== Background ==
On August 22, 2025, Sombr released his debut studio album I Barely Know Her, which was met with widespread critical acclaim. On April 13, 2026, he announced the You Are The Reason Tour, his first arena tour spanning 37 dates across North America. On April 15, he added additional shows in Denver and New York City. On September 1, he added European, Oceanian and additional Mexican dates for the arena tour in 2027, with Ravyn Lenae, Jessie Mazin and Suki Waterhouse serving as opening acts. On September 2, due to high demand, a second show for London, Amsterdam, Cologne, Melbourne, and Sydney were announced. London would subsequently add a third, fourth and fifth show due to extraordinary demand, whilst Melbourne, Sydney, and Brisbane each added one additional show.

== Set list ==
This set list is from the July 26 2026 concert in Morrison. It does not represent all concerts for the tour.

1. "We Never Dated"
2. "I Wish I Knew How to Quit You"
3. "Under The Mat"
4. "Perfume"
5. "Come Closer"
6. "Homewrecker"
7. "My Body Isn't Ready"
8. "Canal Street"
9. "Do I Ever Cross Your Mind"
10. "Undressed"
11. "Potential"
12. "Crushing"
13. "Caroline"
14. "Would've Been You"
15. "Back to Friends"
16. "12 to 12"

== Tour dates ==
List of 2026 concerts, showing date, city, country, venue and opening acts
Date (2026)	City	Country	Venue	Opening acts
July 22	Mexico City	Mexico	Pepsi Center	King Princess
July 26	Morrison	United States	Red Rocks Amphitheatre	King Princess
July 27	Morrison	United States	Red Rocks Amphitheatre	King Princess
September 29	Vancouver	Canada	Rogers Arena	The Hellp; Interpol
October 1	Seattle	United States	Climate Pledge Arena	The Hellp; Balu Brigada
October 2	Portland	United States	Moda Center	The Hellp; Balu Brigada
October 6	Sacramento	United States	Golden 1 Center	The Hellp; Tom Odell
October 7	San Jose	United States	SAP Center	The Hellp; Tom Odell
October 9	Anaheim	United States	Honda Center	The Hellp; Tom Odell
October 10	Inglewood	United States	Kia Forum	The Hellp; Tom Odell
October 13	San Diego	United States	Pechanga Arena	The Hellp; Tom Odell
October 14	Glendale	United States	Desert Diamond Arena	The Hellp; Tom Odell
October 16	Oklahoma City	United States	Paycom Center	The Hellp; The Last Dinner Party
October 17	Houston	United States	Toyota Center	The Hellp; The Last Dinner Party
October 18	Dallas	United States	American Airlines Center	The Hellp; The Last Dinner Party
October 20	Austin	United States	Moody Center	The Hellp; The Last Dinner Party
October 22	Atlanta	United States	State Farm Arena	The Hellp; The Last Dinner Party
October 24	Sunrise	United States	Amerant Bank Arena	The Hellp; The Last Dinner Party
October 25	Orlando	United States	Kia Center	The Hellp; The Last Dinner Party
October 27	Charlotte	United States	Spectrum Center	The Hellp; The Last Dinner Party
October 28	Nashville	United States	Bridgestone Arena	The Hellp; The Last Dinner Party
October 30	St. Louis	United States	Enterprise Center	Hannah Jadagu; The Last Dinner Party
October 31	Kansas City	United States	T-Mobile Center	Hannah Jadagu; The Last Dinner Party
November 1	Minneapolis	United States	Target Center	Hannah Jadagu; The Last Dinner Party
November 3	Milwaukee	United States	Fiserv Forum	Hannah Jadagu; The Last Dinner Party
November 4	Chicago	United States	United Center	Hannah Jadagu; The Last Dinner Party
November 6	Indianapolis	United States	Gainbridge Fieldhouse	Hannah Jadagu; Dove Cameron
November 7	Detroit	United States	Little Caesars Arena	Hannah Jadagu; Dove Cameron
November 8	Columbus	United States	Nationwide Arena	Hannah Jadagu; Dove Cameron
November 10	Washington D.C.	United States	Capital One Arena	Hannah Jadagu; Dove Cameron
November 12	Pittsburgh	United States	PPG Paints Arena	Hannah Jadagu; Dove Cameron
November 13	Cleveland	United States	Rocket Arena	Hannah Jadagu; Dove Cameron
November 14	Buffalo	United States	KeyBank Center	Hannah Jadagu; Dove Cameron
November 16	Toronto	Canada	Scotiabank Arena	Hannah Jadagu; Dove Cameron
November 18	Boston	United States	TD Garden	Hannah Jadagu; Dove Cameron
November 19	Philadelphia	United States	Xfinity Mobile Arena	Hannah Jadagu; Dove Cameron
November 21	Newark	United States	Prudential Center	Hannah Jadagu; Dove Cameron
November 23	New York City	United States	Madison Square Garden	Hannah Jadagu; Dove Cameron
November 24	New York City	United States	Madison Square Garden	Hannah Jadagu; Dove Cameron

List of 2027 concerts, showing date, city, country, venue and opening acts
Date (2027)	City	Country	Venue	Opening acts
January 29	Mexico City	Mexico	Pepsi Center	—
January 30	Mexico City	Mexico	Pepsi Center	—
April 13	Adelaide	Australia	Adelaide Entertainment Centre	—
April 15	Melbourne	Australia	Rod Laver Arena	—
April 16	Melbourne	Australia	Rod Laver Arena	—
April 17	Melbourne	Australia	Rod Laver Arena	—
April 19	Brisbane	Australia	Brisbane Entertainment Centre	—
April 20	Brisbane	Australia	Brisbane Entertainment Centre	—
April 22	Sydney	Australia	Afterpay Arena	—
April 23	Sydney	Australia	Afterpay Arena	—
April 24	Sydney	Australia	Afterpay Arena	—
April 27	Auckland	New Zealand	Spark Arena	—
May 5	Oslo	Norway	Unity Arena	Ravyn Lenae; Jessie Mazin
May 9	Stockholm	Sweden	Avicii Arena	Ravyn Lenae; Jessie Mazin
May 11	Helsinki	Finalnd	Veikkaus Arena	Ravyn Lenae; Jessie Mazin
May 13	Copenhagen	Denmark	Royal Arena	Ravyn Lenae; Jessie Mazin
May 14	Hamburg	Germany	Barclays Arena	Ravyn Lenae; Jessie Mazin
May 16	Antwerp	Belgium	AFAS Dome	Ravyn Lenae; Jessie Mazin
May 18	Berlin	Germany	Uber Arena	Ravyn Lenae; Jessie Mazin
May 19	Prague	Czechia	O_{2} Arena	Ravyn Lenae; Jessie Mazin
May 22	Paris	France	Accor Arena	Ravyn Lenae; Jessie Mazin
May 23	Cologne	Germany	Lanxess Arena	Ravyn Lenae; Jessie Mazin
May 24	Cologne	Germany	Lanxess Arena	Ravyn Lenae; Jessie Mazin
May 27	Zürich	Switzerland	Hallenstadion	Ravyn Lenae; Jessie Mazin
May 28	Munich	Germany	Olympiahalle	Ravyn Lenae; Jessie Mazin
May 29	Vienna	Austria	Wiener Stadthalle	Ravyn Lenae; Jessie Mazin
May 31	Amsterdam	Netherlands	Ziggo Dome	Ravyn Lenae; Jessie Mazin
June 1	Amsterdam	Netherlands	Ziggo Dome	Ravyn Lenae; Jessie Mazin
June 15	Dublin	Ireland	Malahide Castle	Suki Waterhouse
June 17 (Note: This concert was a part of Belsonic.)	Belfast	Northern Ireland	Ormeau Park	Suki Waterhouse
June 19 (Note: This concert was a part of Glasgow Summer Sessions.)	Glasgow	Scotland	Bellahouston Park	Suki Waterhouse
June 21	London	England	The O_{2} Arena	Suki Waterhouse
June 22	London	England	The O_{2} Arena	Suki Waterhouse
June 24	London	England	The O_{2} Arena	Suki Waterhouse
June 25	London	England	The O_{2} Arena	Suki Waterhouse
June 29	London	England	The O_{2} Arena	Suki Waterhouse
July 14 (Note: This concert was a part of I-Days Milano.)	Milan	Italy	Ippodromo Snai La Maura	—
