= The Hellp =

American band

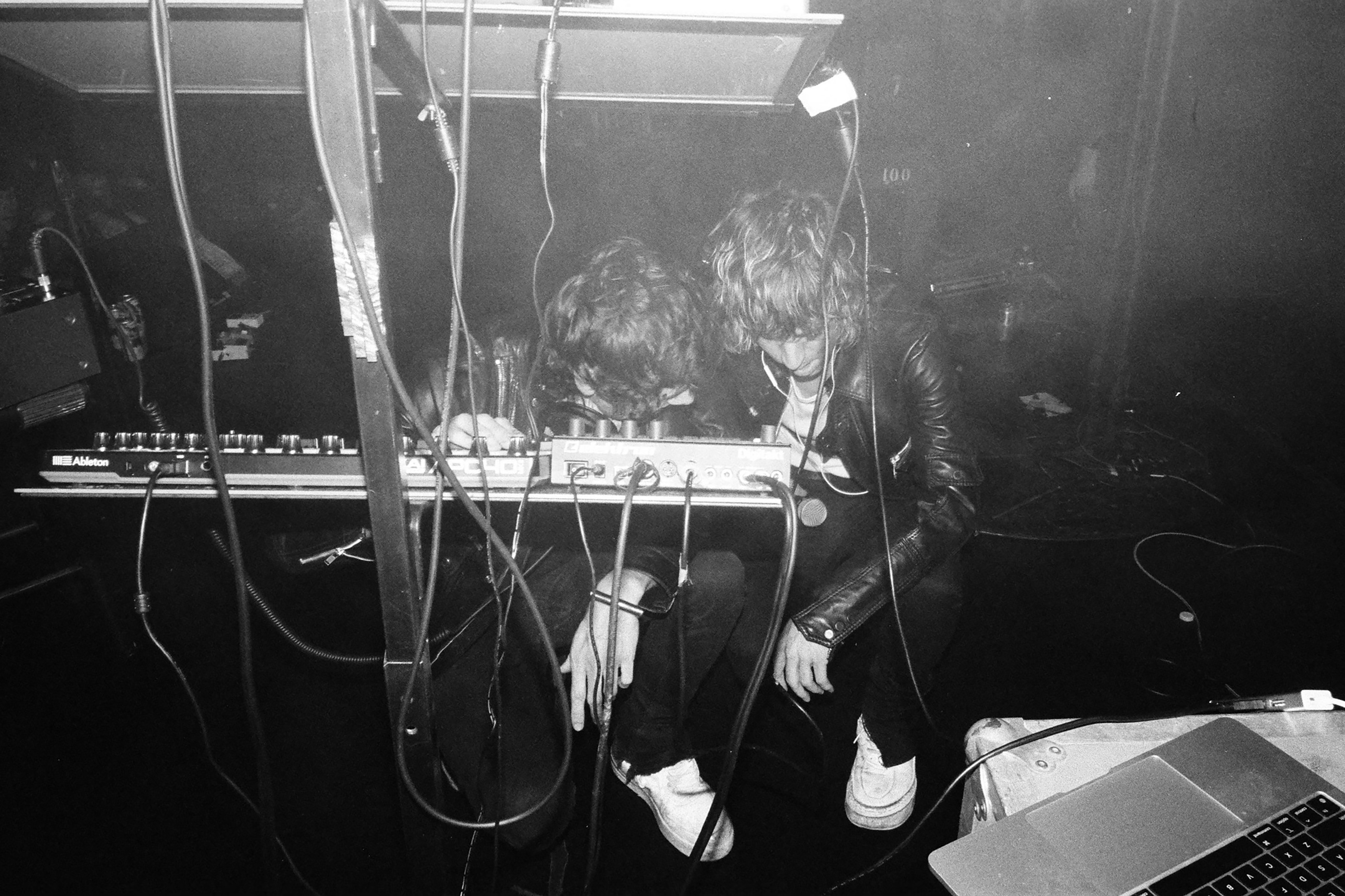
- The Hellp in 2025. (L–R) Chandler Lucy and Noah Dillon

Background information
- Origin: Durango, Colorado, U.S.
- Genres: Electronic; electroclash; indie rock (early); indie sleaze; bloghouse
- Years active: 2015–present
- Labels: Atlantic Records (Anemoia), Terrible Records
- Members: Noah Dillon: Chandler Lucy
- Past members: Eddie Liaboh: Devin Finucane
- Website: https://www.thehellp.us

The Hellp is an electronic music duo based in Los Angeles, California, consisting of Noah Dillon and Chandler Lucy. The band released their debut album Twin Sinner in 2016, followed by numerous extended plays and singles. In 2024, their sophomore album LL was released on Atlantic Records. Their third album Riviera was released in November 2025. The group is associated with the indie sleaze revival of the 2020s, though they reject the label.

== History ==
=== Formation and Twin Sinner (2015–2016) ===
The Hellp was formed in 2015 by Noah Dillon, Eddie Liaboh and Devin Finucane in Durango, Colorado. Dillon and Liaboh were introduced through Finucane after Dillon tweeted about his desire to start a band. The group released their debut single "Wingspan" with an accompanying music video directed by Dillon and Jack Bridger on January 21, 2016, in anticipation of their debut album Twin Sinner, which was released on February 25, 2016. Twin Sinner was pulled from streaming platforms shortly after release, and Liaboh cut ties with the band. After the release of Twin Sinner, Dillon recruited Chandler Lucy to play drums for the band after the two met at a photoshoot with Luka Sabbat. Lucy was born and raised in Glen Ellen, California. The Hellp continued as a duo of Dillon and Lucy.

=== Curtis and Lucy (2017–2019) ===
Throughout the summer of 2017, the band released the tracks "Elevation 001", "Beacon 002", "Heaven Sync", and "Dirty 003". In October 2018, the band released the extended play Curtis. The music video for "Feel" was later shown as a three screen installation at an exhibition for Dillon and Sabbat's art collective Hot Mess. In December of the same year, they released another EP, titled Lucy.

=== Vol 1. and Enemy (2021–2022) ===
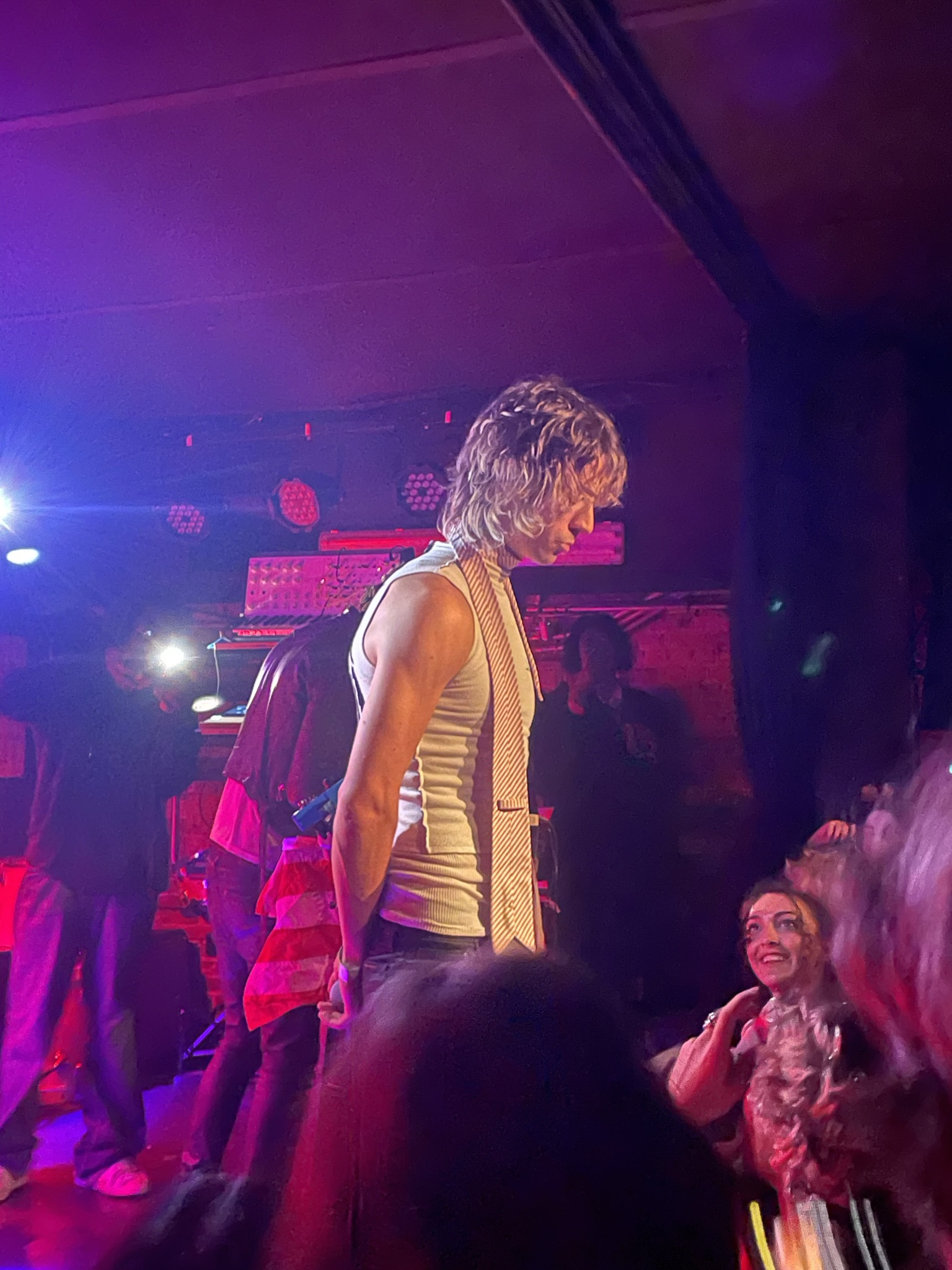
Noah Dillon onstage at The Hellp's Mercury Lounge performance following the release of Enemy.

In 2021, The Hellp signed to Terrible Records. On April 26, 2021, they released the single "Lord Jesus" which was released ahead of their compilation Vol. 1, which features twelve tracks from their previous releases.

On July 27, 2021, the band released the single "Height" from their forthcoming EP Enemy with an accompanying music video. On August 18, 2021, they performed on NTS Radio. In September they released two more singles, "yrstruly" and "Undertow". Enemy was released on October 1, 2021.

On May 27, 2022, they released Enemy Remixed, an EP containing remixes of Enemy tracks from Xiu Xiu, CFCF, Damon Rush, and Club Eat. On August 10, 2022, they released the single "meant2be". In December 2022, the duo's fashion style was noted in an editorial in The Guardian as preceding the indie sleaze revival, though, they reject the label. Their music has also been associated with bloghouse.

=== Atlantic Records, LL, LL Revisited, and Riviera (2023–present) ===
In 2023, The Hellp signed to Atlantic Records under the imprint Anemoia. On May 16, 2023, they released their debut single on Atlantic, "California Dream Girl". A short film directed by Dillon was released for the track on July 23, 2023.

On June 28, 2024, the band released the single "Colorado" alongside a visualizer. On August 23, 2024, they released the song and music video "Caustic". "Go Somewhere" was released officially on September 20, 2024. Three more songs, "Stunn", "LL", and a new version of "Sinamen" were released in October 2024 in anticipation of their second album LL. LL was released on October 25, 2024. The song "Ether" was co-produced with electronic artist 2hollis and the song "Distribution" contains vocals from Sabrina Fuentes of the band Pretty Sick. Pitchfork gave the album a score of 7.0, praising the sentimentality of its "gritty, digitized mutation of 2000s electroclash and indie rock" while considering the duo's "self-mythologizing" before the album's release to have been exaggerated. Ann Powers and Hazel Cillis of NPR included LL in their weekly roundup of the "most compelling" new music.

On April 20, 2025, they performed a DJ set at DoLab Coachella. On April 30, 2025, they released an EP entitled LL Revisited consisting of four tracks not featured on LL.

On September 9, 2025, the band announced their third studio album Riviera, which was originally set to be released in October 2025. On September 11, they released the single "Country Road". On October 3 they released a second single titled "Doppler", followed by a third titled "Here I Am" on October 17. The album eventually released the following month on November 21.

On April 13, 2026, it was announced they would be opening for American pop artist sombr on the North American leg of his You Are The Reason Tour.

== Discography ==
=== Studio albums ===
Title	Album details
Twin Sinner	Released: February 25, 2016; Label: Self-released; Format: Digital download, streaming (Note: No longer available on streaming services.)
LL	Released: October 25, 2024; Label: Anemoia, Atlantic; Format: LP, CD, digital download, streaming
Riviera	Released: November 21, 2025; Label: Anemoia, Atlantic; Format: LP, CD, digital download, streaming

=== Compilation albums ===
Title	Compilation album details
Vol. 1	Released: April 28, 2021; Label: Terrible; Format: Digital download, streaming

=== EPs ===
Title	EP details
Curtis	Released: October 23, 2018; Label: Swanheart; Format: Digital download, streaming (Note: No longer available on streaming services.)
Lucy	Released: December 27, 2018; Label: Swanheart; Format: Digital download, streaming (Note: No longer available on streaming services.)
Enemy	Released: October 1, 2021; Label: Terrible; Format: CD, digital download, streaming
LL Revisited	Released: April 30, 2025; Label: Anemoia, Atlantic; Format: Digital download, streaming

=== Remix EPs ===
Title	Remix EP details
Enemy Remixed	Released: May 27, 2022; Label: Terrible; Format: Digital download, streaming

=== Singles ===
Title	Year	Album
"Wingspan"	2016	Twin Sinner & Vol. 1
"Confluence"	2016	Twin Sinner & Vol. 1
"Elevation 001"	2017	Vol. 1
"Beacon 002"	2017	Vol. 1
"Dirty 003"	2017	Vol. 1
"Clense 220"	2019	Non-album single
"Ssx"	2019	Vol. 1
"Vertigo"	2019	Vol. 1
"Lord Jesus"	2021	Vol. 1
"Height"	2021	Enemy
"Yrstruly"	2021	Enemy
"Undertow"	2021	Enemy
"Meant2Be"	2022	Non-album single
"California Dream Girl"	2023	Non-album single
"Colorado"	2024	LL
"Caustic"	2024	LL
"Go Somewhere"	2024	LL
"Stunn"	2024	LL
"LL" / "Sinamen"	2024	LL
"Hazel"	2025	LL Revisited
"Hot Fun"	2025	LL Revisited
"Country Road"	2025	Riviera
"Doppler"	2025	Riviera
"Here I Am"	2025	Riviera

=== Music videos ===
- "Wingspan" (2016)
- "Oxygen" (2016)
- "Confluence" (2016)
- "Queen Cement" (2016)
- "Idols" (2016)
- "Orange Crush" (2016)
- "Skinnybodies" (2016)
- "Haze" (2016)
- "Elevation 001" (2017)
- "Heaven Sync" (2017)
- "Beacon 002" (2017)
- "Sinamen / Peroxide" (2018)
- "Feel" (2018)
- "Tu Tu Neurotic" (2018)
- "Vertigo" (2019)
- "Lord Jesus" (2021)
- "Ssx" (2021)
- "Height" (2021)
- "Undertow (Xiu Xiu Remix)" (2022)
- "Undertow (damon r. Remix)" (2022)
- "meant2be" (2022)
- "California Dream Girl" (2023)
- "Colorado" (2024)
- "Caustic" (2024)
- "Go Somewhere" (2024)
- "Rllynice" (2024)
- "LL / Stunn" (2024)
- "Halo" (2025)
- "Live Forever" (2025)
- "New Wave America" (2025)
- "Revenge of the Mouse Diva" (2026)
