= Sixes & Sevens =

Studio album by Adam Green
- Released: March 7, 2008
- Genre: Anti-folk, baroque pop, blues rock
- Label: Rough Trade

Adam Green chronology
Jacket Full of Danger (2006)	Sixes & Sevens (2008)	Minor Love (2010)

Professional ratings
Aggregate scores
Source	Rating
Metacritic	60/100
Review scores
Source	Rating
AllMusic	3/5 stars
Twisted Ear	2/5 stars
The Skinny	4/5 stars
Spin	2.5/5 stars
NME	8/10
Pitchfork	7.4/10

Sixes & Sevens is Adam Green's fifth solo record, released by Rough Trade Records in Europe on March 7, 2008. A few days later, on March 10, it was released in the UK, followed closely by a US release on March 18. The first single was "Morning After Midnight".

== Track listing ==
1. "Festival Song"
2. "Tropical Island"
3. "Cannot Get Sicker"
4. "That Sounds Like a Pony"
5. "Morning After Midnight"
6. "Twee Twee Dee"
7. "You Get So Lucky"
8. "Getting Led"
9. "Drowning Head First"
10. "Broadcast Beach"
11. "It's a Fine"
12. "Homelife"
13. "Be My Man"
14. "Grandma Shirley and Papa"
15. "When A Pretty Face"
16. "Exp. 1"
17. "Leaky Flask"
18. "Bed of Prayer"
19. "Sticky Ricki"
20. "Rich Kids"
21. "You're a Heartbreaker"
22. "Spoonful" [Live at Coca-Cola Soundwave]
23. "I Wanna Die" [Live in Berlin]
24. "Salty Candy" [Live at Nuke Festival]

Tracks 21 to 24 are bonus tracks from some editions.

The album was originally supposed to consist of 16 songs. After much persuasion, Green convinced his label to release the full 20 song album. The original track listing was:

1. "Festival Song"
2. "It's a Fine"
3. "Morning After Midnight"
4. "When A Pretty Face"
5. "Twee Twee Dee"
6. "You Get So Lucky"
7. "Homelife"
8. "Getting Led"
9. "Be My Man"
10. "Drowning Head First"
11. "Grandma Shirley and Papa"
12. "Cannot Get Sicker"
13. "Bed of Prayer"
14. "Tropical Island"
15. "Leaky Flask"
16. "Rich Kids"
