= Buzzgrinder =

Former online MP3 blog

Buzzgrinder.com was one of the longest-running MP3 blogs online. It was started in July 2001 in eastern Pennsylvania, United States, and is now based in Louisville, Kentucky.

== Notable stories ==
In addition to offering "music news + useless opinion" for nearly a decade, Buzzgrinder has broken several heavily reported stories over the years, including Jim Ward's refusal to do an At the Drive-in reunion, rumors of Ted Leo's retirement, Across Five Aprils' album leak hoax, and the confirmation of Guided by Voices' 2010 reunion tour, among others.

== Concert promotion ==
Buzzgrinder has also promoted several concerts with notable acts such as Rival Schools, Matt and Kim, Deftones, High on Fire, Torche, mewithoutYou, J Mascis' Sweet Apple, J Roddy Walston and the Business, and The Henry Clay People.
