= Tonspion =

German free MP3 blog

Tonspion (e.g. "tone spy") is the first German MP3 blog founded in 1998 in Cologne, Germany and moved to Berlin in 2001. The editorial team is reviewing the best free MP3 Downloads on the web, offering links to the source of the download, usually artists and labels. Tonspion became the first German guide for free downloads all over the World Wide Web.

In 2001 Tonspion set up an English website under the name "Tonespy" with an own team of editors, which was later discontinued.

Tonspion has a team of five editors and an office in Berlin. Its customer base is composed of companies in Germany and relevant independent labels in MP3 promotion, however, many labels were reluctant with giving away free music at the start of Tonspion. Tonspion was nominated twice (2005 and 2006) for the Grimme Online Award, an award for online media in Germany.

In 2009 Tonspion relaunched the website, now offering free preview streams for all albums and downloads in partnership with 7digital. New features included a tourguide, videos and newsfeeds of the best music blogs in German and English language.
