= Hipster Runoff =

Blog running from 2007–2013

- Type: Blog
- Founder: Carles
- Launched: 2007
- Ceased publication: 2013

Hipster Runoff (HRO) was a blog that ran from 2007 to 2013, created by an anonymous writer who went by the name "Carles". The blog covered and satirized alternative culture and indie music.

Hipster Runoff is credited with defining the term bloghouse in a 2008 post, and coining chillwave, in a 2009 post, along with other satirical genre labels such as slutwave.

== History ==
The blog was created in 2007, and called itself "a blog worth blogging about". Its content frequently contained memes and textspeak, as well as commentary on alternative music. Carles published multiple posts per week until 2010, when he started a new category on his blog called "The Alt Report" and began posting multiple times a day. "The Alt Report" covered breaking news and was written in a different tone of voice. In 2011, Carles started "The Mainstreamer" on his blog, which was also written in a different tone of voice and used Comic Sans as a font.

For a period of time in 2012, the blog changed its name to the Lana Del Report and spent a couple of days only covering the singer Lana Del Rey. Carles posted an explanation and self-parody about the state of his blog, writing, "The opinions that I have on bands are not actually my own, and my goal is not to preserve a relationship with readers or bands/artists based on editorial pandering. All I can do is 'go down in flames' with my sweet, Princess LanaBB. My demented online personality that motivates me to type these words in order to accumulate hits, empathy, praise, and controversy does not have much time left."

== Closure ==
In 2013, the blog stopped updating. In 2015, it posted again with the announcement it was up for sale. Using the online auction website Flippa, Carles sold the website in 2015 along with its related social media handles for $21,100.
