= Friends of Mine (Adam Green album) =

Studio album by Adam Green
- Released: July 22, 2003 (U.S.); June 23, 2003 (EU)
- Recorded: Dumbo Studios, New York City, New York
- Genre: Anti-folk, baroque pop
- Length: 32:50
- Label: Rough Trade
- Producer: Dan Myers

Adam Green chronology
Garfield (2002)	Friends of Mine (2003)	Gemstones (2005)

Professional ratings
Review scores
Source	Rating
AllMusic	3/5 stars
Blender	3/5 stars
Drowned in Sound	10/10
The Independent	3/5 stars
Mojo	4/5 stars
Rolling Stone	3/5 stars
The Rolling Stone Album Guide	3/5 stars

Friends of Mine is the second solo album by anti-folk musician Adam Green, released on July 22, 2003. It relies heavily on short violin-driven melodramatic pop songs and has a much more polished sound than Garfield, Green's 2002 debut album. A sophomore studio album, the recording is noted for containing vocal stylings that are considered to be a departure from those of Green's previous work (including that of The Moldy Peaches), showcasing a deeper 1960s-influenced spin sound feel to the recording.

== Track listing ==
All songs written by Adam Green, except where noted.

1. "Bluebirds" – 2:08
2. "Hard to Be a Girl" – 1:41
3. "Jessica" – 2:37
4. "Musical Ladders" – 2:20
5. "The Prince's Bed" – 2:29
6. "Bunnyranch" – 1:36
7. "Friends of Mine" – 2:49
8. "Frozen in Time" (Adam Green, Galen Pehrson) – 2:12
9. "Broken Joystick" – 1:24
10. "I Wanna Die" – 1:49
11. "Salty Candy" – 1:39
12. "No Legs" – 2:02
13. "We're Not Supposed to Be Lovers" – 3:08
14. "Secret Tongues" – 2:09
15. "Bungee" – 2:53

== Personnel ==
- Adam Green - voice, guitar
- Jane Scarpantoni - strings arrangement, cello
- Steven Mertens - bass, tambourine, drums, bongos, strings arrangement
- Matt Romano - drums
- Greg Calbi - engineering
- Dan Myers - mixing
- David Gold - viola (2)
- Antoine Silverman, Joan Wasser - violin
