= Garfield (album) =

Studio album by Adam Green
- Released: October 22, 2002
- Studio: Balloon Heaven; Dumbo Studios, New York City
- Genre: Anti-folk, lo-fi, garage rock
- Length: 40:50
- Label: Rough Trade

Adam Green chronology
Garfield (2002)	Friends of Mine (2003)

Professional ratings
Review scores
Source	Rating
Allmusic	2.5/5 stars
Robert Christgau	(dud)
Rolling Stone	2/5 stars

Garfield is the debut album by Adam Green, released in 2002. Unlike the rest of his later output, Garfield's sound is more in the vein of Green's other project The Moldy Peaches, and likewise, features a rougher, lo-fi sound than his other albums. The UK release of the album only has the first ten tracks on it, and is entitled Adam Green.

== Track listing ==
All tracks composed by Adam Green

1. "Apples, I'm Home" – 1:45
2. "My Shadow Tags on Behind" – 2:28
3. "Bartholemew" – 3:17
4. "Mozarella Swastikas" – 3:37
5. "Dance with Me" – 3:49
6. "Computer Show" – 3:01
7. "Her Father and Her" – 2:41
8. "Baby's Gonna Die Tonight" – 3:00
9. "Times Are Bad" – 2:36
10. "Can You See Me" – 4:48
11. (untitled silence track) – 1:02
12. "Dance With Me" (EP version) – 3:33
13. "Bleeding Heart" (EP version) – 2:03
14. "Computer Show" (EP version) – 3:04

== Personnel ==
- Adam Green

with:

- Spencer Chakedis - electronics on "Apples, I'm Home" and "Computer Show"
- Joel Green - clarinet on "My Shadow Tags on Behind" and "Times Are Bad"
- Leah Green - vocals on "Bartholemew"
- Turner Cody - Jew's harp on "Can You See Me"
- Matt Romano - drums on "Dance With Me"
- Strictly Beats - drums on "Bleeding Heart" and "Computer Show"
- Steven Mertens - bass on "Computer Show"
