= Zippyshare =

Defunct file-sharing website (2006–2023)

- Website type: File sharing
- Founded: September 2006
- Dissolved: March 31, 2023
- Website: zippyshare.com
- Current status: Defunct

Zippyshare was a free ad-supported file-sharing website founded in September 2006. It was shut down permanently on March 31, 2023 due to multiple factors, including the use of ad blockers.

== Features ==
Zippyshare allowed users to upload an unlimited amount of files with a size of up to 500 MB each. No account registration was required to upload or download files, and there was no limitation on the number of times a file can be downloaded. However, files were deleted if 30 days passed without them receiving any downloads. Zippyshare had an integrated HTML5 web player that allowed users to listen to audio files directly in the browser before downloading. This was revolutionary at the time and made it the default tool for music bloggers.

== History ==
Zippyshare was founded in September 2006. Zippyshare was noted by TorrentFreak to have outlived many similar websites, such as RapidShare, Hotfile, and Megaupload.

Zippyshare was listed as a notorious market by the Office of the United States Trade Representative in 2015, noting that Zippyshare was "well-known for downloads and distribution of allegedly infringing music" and warning that the website had been known to install malware on users' computers. Zippyshare was also referenced in the Recording Industry Association of America's report to the Office of the United States Trade Representative in 2018, with the RIAA also recommending Zippyshare be listed as a notorious market, writing that while the website respected takedown notices, there was no mechanic to prevent re-uploads of infringing content.

In March 2019, access to Zippyshare was blocked for visitors in the United Kingdom, with a HTTP 403 error message displayed. No reason was given for the block, and it was unclear why Zippyshare decided to block users from the UK. Zippyshare became similarly unavailable in Germany in April 2019 and in Spain in June 2019, also with no explanation.

In March 2023, Zippyshare announced the site would be shut down by the end of the month. The administration claimed that they could no longer maintain the site. They also cited decreased activity, higher energy bills and ad blockers. Zippyshare ceased operations on March 31, 2023, and now displays a message directing users to alternative services.
