= Music for Robots (website) =

Defunct MP3 blog

Music for Robots is a defunct MP3 blog written and curated by a collective of friends who originally met at Bates College, who founded the website in April 2004. The blog made history in 2004 when it hosted a song by the band The Secret Machines provided to them by Warner Bros. Records, signaling the first time a major label had deliberately encouraged a blog to post an mp3 by one of its artists. The site gained greater notoriety later that year when MTV aired a news feature about the site and one of their discoveries, a band of teenagers from Brooklyn called Hysterics. In 2005, the "robots" branched out, dipping their toes in concert promotion and releasing a compilation CD titled Music For Robots, Vol. 1, which included music from Hysterics, Avenue D, Death from Above 1979, The Mae Shi, and Daedelus. Music (For Robots) was known for their diverse, comprehensive musical tastes and willingness to cooperate with the record industry, and only post music with permission of the artist and/or label.

Music (For Robots) was featured by many publications and programs in the mainstream media including Wired magazine, The New York Times, Rolling Stone, Spin, NPR, the Fresno Bee, The Guardian, The Philadelphia Inquirer, Stereogum, and was the first MP3 blog to be featured in primetime TV during MTV's TRL program in early 2005.

== See also ==
- MP3 blog
