= LL (album) =

Studio album by The Hellp
- Released: October 25, 2024
- Genre: Electroclash
- Length: 45:25
- Label: Anemoia; Atlantic

The Hellp chronology
Enemy Remixed (2022)	LL (2024)	LL Revisited (2025)

Singles from LL
- 1. "Colorado" Released: June 28, 2024; 2. "Caustic" Released: August 23, 2024; 3. "Go Somewhere" Released: September 20, 2024; 4. "Stunn" Released: October 18, 2024; 5. "LL / Sinamen" Released: October 21, 2024

LL is the second (Note: While this album is advertised by the Hellp as their debut, and is their debut under a record label, it is technically their second studio album counting their since-removed 2016 debut album Twin Sinner.) studio album and major-label debut by American band the Hellp. It was released on October 25, 2024, through Atlantic Records under the imprint Anemoia Records. It was preceded by six singles: "Colorado", "Caustic", "Go Somewhere", "Stunn", "LL", and "Sinamen". A companion EP featuring four extra tracks was released on April 30, 2025, titled LL Revisited.

== Background ==
The first single from LL, "Colorado", was released on June 28, 2024. Alessandra Rincon of Ones to Watch described the song as "a blend of melancholia and momentum" with "subtle pulsing synths and warm guitar riffs", and highlighted Noah Dillon's "raspy" vocal delivery. The album's second single, "Caustic", was released on August 23. In a press release with Paper, the Hellp described the song as "actualizing the collision point of bubblegum pop and a catastrophe". The song's music video is based on archival footage from a 1994 video of the last day of the school year at Calabasas High School. The album's third single, "Go Somewhere", was released on September 20, and has been described as a "frenzied electronic collage" and compared to the early music of Skrillex. On October 10, The Hellp officially announced the title and release date for LL, and revealed its cover art and tracklist. The album's fourth single, "Stunn", was released the following week on October 18, followed by the release of "LL" and "Sinamen" as the album's fifth and sixth singles three days later on October 21.

== Critical reception ==
Professional ratings
Review scores
Source	Rating
Pitchfork	7.0/10

In a positive review, Kieran Press-Reynolds of Pitchfork described LL as "a wanton mixture of electroclash, ’00s dance pop, and digital hyperactivity". Press-Reynolds highlighted a "delirious hook" on "Caustic", as well as an ending of "hardstyle madness" on "Ether". He described "Colorado" and "LL" as "breezily pixelated", and "Shadow" as "hauntingly pretty". He also described a "bleep-bloop maelstrom" on "Sinamen". He was, however, slightly critical of the album's lyrics, feeling that "the storytelling feels sidelined in service of making big, bittersweet anthems". Overall, though, Press-Reynolds stated that the album "feels as much like a love letter to certain inspirations as a love letter to their growth as artists".

== Track listing ==
LL track listing
No.	Title	Writer(s)	Producer(s)	Length
1.	"U"	Noah Patrick Dillon; Chandler Ransom Lucy	Dillon; Lucy	3:25
2.	"Go Somewhere"	Dillon; Liam Hall; Lucy	Dillon; Lucy; Trayer Tryon	3:23
3.	"Colorado"	Dillon; Chris Greatti; Hall; Lucy	Dillon; Greatti; Hall; Lucy	2:39
4.	"Rllynice"	Dillon; Lucy	Dillon; Lucy	2:47
5.	"Caustic"	Dillon; Hall; Junius Karr; Lucy	Dillon; Hall; Lucy; Tryon	2:57
6.	"LL"	Dillon; Lucy; Tryon	Gavin Bennett; Dillon; Greatti; Lucy; Tryon	2:12
7.	"Stunn"	Bennett; Dillon; Lucy; Tryon	Bennett; Dillon; Lucy; Tryon	4:02
8.	"Halo"	Dillon; Lucy; Tryon	Dillon; Lucy; Tryon	3:30
9.	"Sinamen (Note: This song was originally included as an earlier version on the Hellp's 2018 EP Lucy.)"	Dillon; Lucy; Jacob Taff; Tryon	Dillon; Lucy; Taff; Tryon	2:44
10.	"Ether"	Dillon; Hollis Frazier-Herndon; Hall; Lucy	2hollis; Dillon; Lucy	2:54
11.	"9_21"	Dillon; Avi Henig; Karr; Lucy	Dillon; Henig; Karr; Lucy	3:50
12.	"Shadow"	Dillon; Lucy	Dillon; Lucy	3:05
13.	"Kill4Me"	Dillon; Gabe Greenland; Hall; Henig; Lucy	Dillon; Greenland; Lucy	3:04
14.	"Distribution"	Dillon; Sabrina Fuentes; Hall; Lucy	Dillon; Lucy	4:55
Total length:				45:25
