= Mark Hunter (photographer) =

American photographer (born 1985)

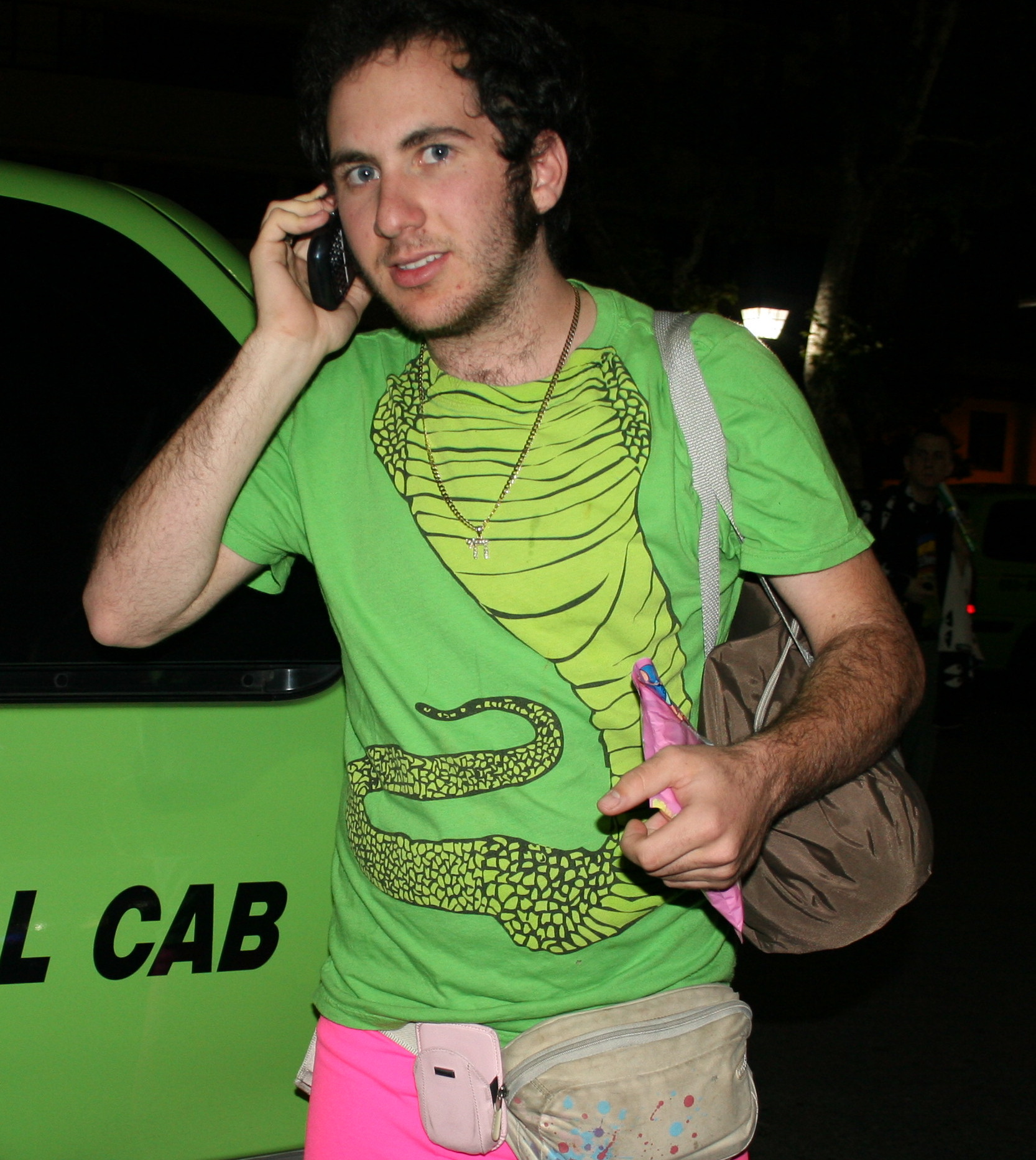
- Hunter in 2007
- Born: July 21, 1985 (age 40); Los Angeles, California, U.S.
- Other name: The Cobrasnake
- Occupation: Photographer
- Website: thecobrasnake.com

Mark Hunter (born July 21, 1985), also known as The Cobrasnake, is an American photographer. He is known for his photographs of American nightlife, particularly from the mid 2000s to the early 2010s.

== Early life ==
Hunter grew up in Los Angeles. He was raised by a single mom who worked as a dental hygienist for Bill Dorfman, a dentist popular with celebrities. Through his mother’s job, he was able to meet numerous celebrities as a young child. He attended Santa Monica High School.

== Career ==
Hunter was an assistant to the artist Shepard Fairey for several years. Through his work with Fairey, he would attend parties and events attended by many well known artists and musicians. He would bring his camera along to photograph and would often be asked to take pictures for people who left their cameras at home. He started to post the photos to a website he created in early 2004 called Polaroid Scene. His website of photos of late-night parties frequented by up-and-coming musicians, "it-kids", and indie celebrities is considered according to Vogue “one of the earliest and most impactful social photography sites of its kind”. It allowed anyone on the internet to have access to the emerging hipster subculture. He changed the name of his website to thecobrasnake.com after receiving a cease and desist letter from Polaroid.

In the summer of 2005, Hunter met Cory Kennedy at a Blood Brothers concert at the El Rey Theatre in Los Angeles. He took some photographs of her for his web site and they exchanged phone numbers. In January 2006, Kennedy and her best friend began an internship at his office, to fulfill a requirement from her high school for graduation. In December 2005, Hunter posted photos of Kennedy with the title "JFK CORY KENNEDY", which began speculation that she was somehow related to the Kennedy family, which she is not. By April, Hunter noticed that every time he posted photos of Kennedy on his site, the web traffic from fashion community sites would spike. He quickly realized that Kennedy had the potential to be a star.

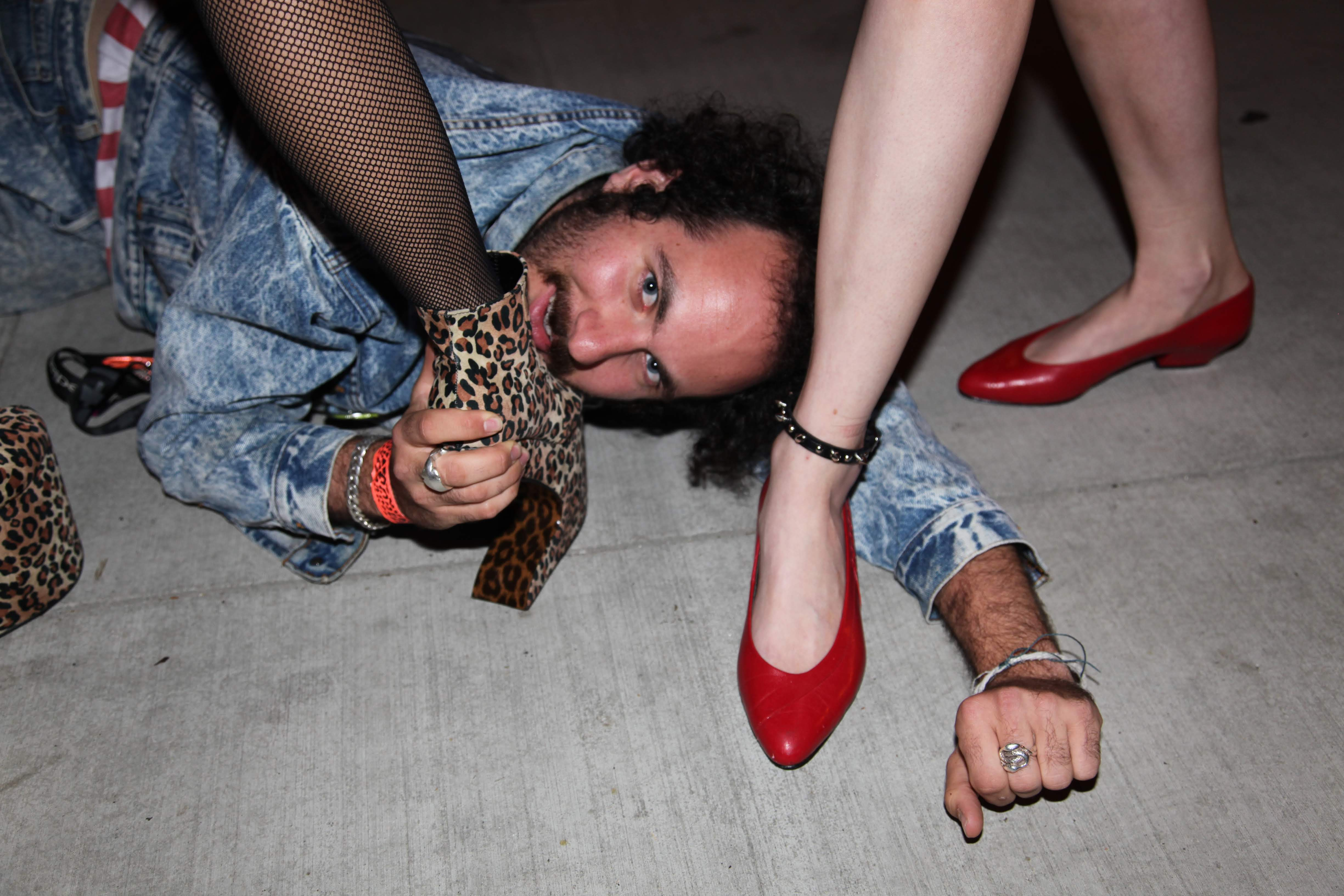
Hunter in 2011

In 2010, Hunter opened Cobra Shop, a vintage store in the Hollywood and Highland Center mall. The shop sold exclusive pieces by some of Hunter’s friends including Steve Aoki, Shepard Fairey, Jeremy Scott, and Todd Selby.

In 2011, Hunter released a collection with Boy London. He also released a pair of high heeled shoes with Irregular Choice.

In 2018, Hunter started Cobra Fitness Club, a twice-weekly group hike through Runyon Canyon.

=== Book ===
In 2022, Hunter published The Cobrasnake: Y2Ks Archive, a monograph of his work going back to 2004.
