= MP3 blog =

Blog in which the creator makes music files available for download

An MP3 blog is a type of blog in which the creator makes music files, normally in the MP3 format, available for download. They are also known as musicblogs, audioblogs or soundblogs (the latter two can also mean podcasts). The music posted ranges from hard-to-find rarities that have not been issued in many years to more contemporary offerings, and selections are often restricted to a particular musical genre or theme.

== History ==
Among the few first MP3 blogs were Tonspion, Buzzgrinder, Fluxblog, Stereogum and Said the Gramophone. Tonspion is the first MP3 blog in Germany and started in 1998 with reviews and downloads that international artists and labels gave out free on the web. Buzzgrinder began in 2001 as a way for musician SethW to fill time on the road. Stereogum began as a music-related LiveJournal in 2002, though its format was focused on indie/pop gossip rather than MP3s. Fluxblog (also founded in 2002) trumpeted LCD Soundsystem's "Yeah (Stupid Version)" in early 2004 brought increased attention to MP3 blogs, while Montreal-based Said the Gramophone, founded in 2003, was among the first websites to write about artists like Arcade Fire, Wolf Parade and Tune-Yards. A July, 2004 story by Reuters and an August, 2004 story on National Public Radio further galvanized the trend, and today there are thousands of MP3 blogs covering a cornucopia of musical styles.

A significant number of indie music labels, promotional agencies and hundreds of artists regularly send promo CDs to MP3 blogs in the hopes of gaining free publicity. Major labels with small acts to promote have also attempted to use MP3 blogs. In 2004, Warner Bros. gave permission for a song by their act The Secret Machines to be posted by the MP3 blog Music (For Robots). This drew attention not only for the song and the label granting permissions, but also because several comments praising the track came from IP addresses within the Warner Bros. network. The publicity generated by MP3 blogs crossed the line from the internet to TV in early 2005, when Music (For Robots) was featured during MTV's Total Request Live program for bringing the Hysterics, a Brooklyn rock band composed of four 14- and 15-year-old high school students, to the network's attention.

In 2006, Sirius Satellite Radio began broadcasting "blog radio", a show on the College/Indie Rock channel Left of Center. The show lets music bloggers talk about the latest in the indie-rock scene.

== Aggregators ==
Aggregators such as The Hype Machine track MP3 blog posts and display the most recently updated posts on its front page. The services are meant to provide a snapshot of what's going on in music blogging and make it easier to search through recently posted MP3s. The Hype Machine features a list of the most popular tracks of the last three days, as well as the most blogged bands and most popular searches. In June 2009, the popular songs list was altered so that it is only affected by user accounts that are several days old, after it was discovered that the "hearts scores" for dozens of songs were being artificially inflated by dummy accounts, often created in batches numbering in the hundreds. Elbo.ws had a similar feature listing which Bands, Tracks, and Videos are currently "hot." However Elbo which had been around since 2005 shut down in late 2013. Music Blog Aggregators have caused a boom in MP3 blog readership and accessibility. Aggregators use RSS technology to collect data from MP3 blogs and link to the individual blog posts instead of directly to the MP3s.

The Hype Machine does not list blogs whose writers or editors are involved in the music public relations industry.

== Legal status ==
Many MP3 blogs post copyrighted material as free download. While this is essentially illegal, record companies often turn a blind eye because of a belief that the blogs constitute free advertising. Bands such as Clap Your Hands Say Yeah and The National have reported increases in sales as a result of attention from MP3 blogs, which often provide links to legal album downloads.

MP3 bloggers commonly post disclaimers stating that all files are intended only for sampling, and often remove posted files within a short period of time.

The economic significance of MP3 blogs is relatively small compared to peer-to-peer networks.

In addition to providing free music, many popular MP3 blogs have started their own DIY record labels, often providing publicity services free or little money. A few blogs that have emerged in the recent times are Another Banger, Pitchfork, Electro Wow, and Youredm
