= Cory Kennedy (model) =

American blogger and Internet celebrity

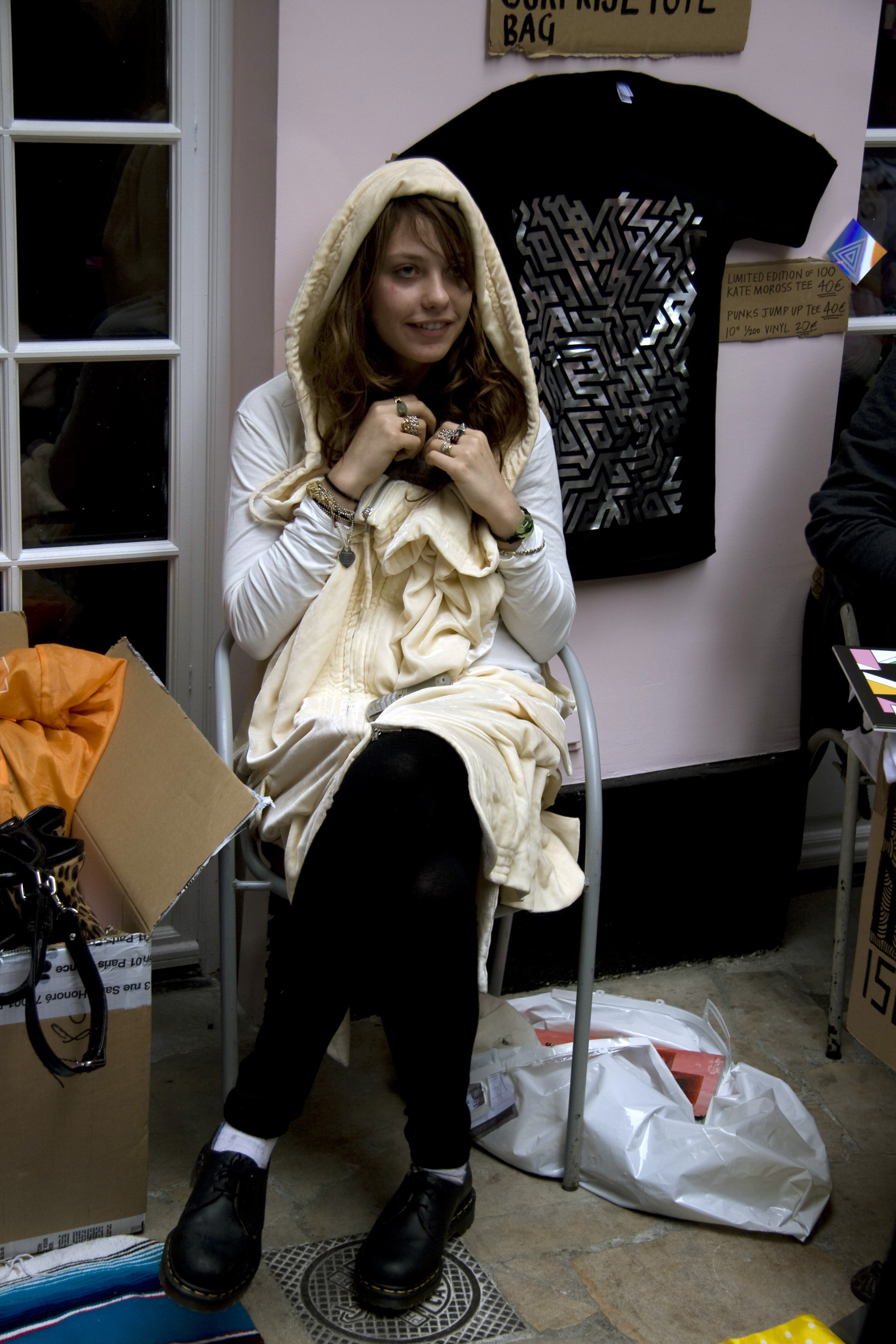
- Kennedy in Paris, March 2008
- Born: Cory Kennedy Levin; February 21, 1990 (age 36); Santa Monica, California, U.S.
- Modeling information
- Hair color: Brown
- Eye color: Brown
- Website: Official website

Cory Kennedy-Levin (born February 21, 1990) is an American model and Internet celebrity. She gained popularity as the Internet's first It girl during the indie sleaze movement of the late 2000s.

== Early life ==
Kennedy was born in Santa Monica, California on February 21, 1990. Her family moved around from West Hollywood and Manhattan Beach before settling in Santa Monica in 2000. When she started attending Santa Monica High School in 2003, she began struggling with bouts of sadness and would seclude herself away from others. While in school she felt she was surrounded by peers who were more academically advanced and overall more privileged. In the same year, her mother enrolled her in a month long UCLA program for those dealing with clinical depression. This would later drastically affect how she mentally handled international career success.

Kennedy met the photographer Mark Hunter at a Blood Brothers concert at the El Rey Theatre in Los Angeles in the summer of 2005. He took some photographs of her for his website and they exchanged phone numbers. In January 2006, Kennedy began an internship at his office, to fulfill a requirement from her high school for graduation in photojournalism.

== Career ==
Hunter's website featured photos of celebrities at various parties, to which he began bringing Kennedy. Hunter and Kennedy began dating with the approval of her parents. By this point, Kennedy had become his muse.

In December 2005, Hunter had posted photos of Kennedy with the title "JFK CORY KENNEDY", which began speculation that she was somehow related to the Kennedy family, which she is not. By April, Hunter claims that he had noticed that every time he posted photos of Kennedy on his site, the web traffic from the fashion community sites would spike. Hunter quickly realized that Kennedy had the potential to be a star. Her fame had started in the Netherlands, and soon became international. While on vacation with her family, Kennedy and Hunter visited the offices of Nylon magazine, the editor-in-chief of which was a friend of Hunter's. The very next day she was in a photo shoot for an issue focused on music and MySpace, which hit news stands in June.

She was mentioned in an article about interns in The New York Times, and the LA Weekly's Caroline Ryder wrote a short article about her. In October, she appeared in a mock music video for Good Charlotte's "Keep Your Hands Off My Girl", directed by Nylon's editor-in-chief Marvin Scott Jarrett.

Her parents had known about her exposure online but had not realized the extent to which it had grown until the June issue of Nylon appeared. Their primary concern had been her health and well-being. By September 2006, her celebrity life began to conflict with her home and school life and Kennedy and Hunter had split due to his focus on work. Worrying for her education, her parents had her placed in a boarding school, a "nonpublic therapeutic placement for kids with various types of learning, behavioral and emotional problems" with limited phone and computer use, although she was free to return home on weekends.

In April 2007, Kennedy had her own column in Nylon Magazine, where she claimed to focusing on a documentary about exploring the depths of rising pop culture icons. In the fall of 2007, Kennedy was named the face of Urban Decay. In September 2007, appeared on the cover of Jalouse Magazine, shot by French photographer, and video director Jean-Baptiste Mondino.

In May 2008, she starred in an ad campaign for Procter & Gamble's "Sebastian" line of hair products. From May 3-August 31, 2008, photographs of Kennedy were on display in The Andy Warhol Museum. Deemed an 'Uberstar' and hand-picked by sculptor/visual artist Glenn Kaino a group of models were meant represent his 21st Century take on Andy Warhol's Superstars. For the exhibit, Kaino took portraits of his "Uberstars" using a Polaroid Big Shot camera, the type of instant camera Warhol used for his infamous series. Kennedy and Hunter both appeared in the first episode of 90210.

In 2023, the New York magazine revealed a collection of It girl covers of women who influenced New York's social scene, with Kennedy representing the 2000s.

== Personal life ==
Kennedy has struggled with clinical depression since the fourth grade. Kennedy has a fraternal twin sister named Chris.
