= Lists of music genres =

List of Lists

This is a list of lists of music genres.

- Genealogy of musical genres
- List of styles of music: A–F
- List of styles of music: G–M
- List of styles of music: N–R
- List of styles of music: S–Z
- List of blues music genres
- List of classical music genres
- List of classical and art music traditions
- List of country genres
- List of cultural and regional genres of music
- List of electronic music genres
- List of folk music traditions
- List of hardcore punk genres
- List of heavy metal genres
- List of hip-hop genres
- List of house genres
- List of ID3v1 genres
- List of industrial music genres
- List of jazz genres
- List of microgenres
- List of musical genres of the African diaspora
- List of music genres and styles
- List of music styles that incorporate the accordion
- List of opera genres
- List of pop music genres
- List of punk rock subgenres
- List of reggae genres
- List of rock genres
- List of trance genres
