= List of styles of music: A–F =

This is a partial list of music genres and styles, covering entries for numbers and the letters from A to F.

For the other sections, see Section G–M, Section N–R and Section S–Z.

== 0–9 ==
- 2-step garage – a chaotic style of UK garage.
- 20th-century classical music – a loose term for music in the modern style of European art-music, composed during the 20th century.
- 4-beat – a breakbeat hardcore style played between 150 and 170 BPM consisting of a fast looped breakbeat and a drum at every 4 beats.

== A ==
- A cappella – a style of music performed without any background music/instruments and just voices doing the instrumentation.
- Absolute music – music that is not explicitly "about" anything.
- Acid house – a psychedelic style of house music, defined primarily by the deep basslines and "squelching" sounds of the Roland TB-303 electronic synthesizer-sequencer.
- Acid jazz – a psychedelic music genre that combines elements of jazz, soul music, funk, and disco.
- Acid rock – a harder style of psychedelic rock, characterized by long instrumental solos, few (if any) lyrics and musical improvisation.
- Acid techno – a style of techno that developed out of acid house.
- Acid trance – a psychedelic style of trance music.
- Acousmatic music – a style of electroacoustic music that is specifically composed for presentation using speakers as opposed to a live performance.
- Acoustic music – a music that solely or primarily uses instruments which produce sound through entirely acoustic means, as opposed to electric or electronic means.
- Adult contemporary music – any music with lush and soothing qualities that focuses on melody and harmony.
- African-American music – any music made by African-Americans.
- African heavy metal – heavy metal music performed by African musicians.
- African hip-hop – hip-hop performed by African musicians.
- Afrobeat – a large-scaled and energetic combination of funk and jazz.
- Afrobeats – umbrella term for West African pop styles.
- Afro-Cuban jazz – style of jazz influenced by traditional Afro-Cuban music.
- Afro house – a South African, sub-genre of house music, developed between the 1980s and 1990s.
- Afroswing – a genre of music that developed in the UK during the mid-2010s, a derivative of dancehall and afrobeats, with influences from trap, hip-hop, R&B, and grime.
- Afro tech – a sub-genre of afro house originating and predominantly made in South Africa.
- Afro trap – a genre that takes inspiration from both Sub-Saharan African music traditions and modern rap music.
- African popular music – an umbrella term, "afro pop", for all the various, African genres of African Music.
- Aguinaldo – traditional Latin American Christmas music.

=== Al-An ===
- Alaskan hip-hop – a resurgent subgenre of hip-hop within the state of Alaska, primarily in the metropolitan areas of Anchorage and Fairbanks, and to a lesser extent Juneau.
- Aleatoric music – music the composition of which is partially left to chance.
- Alternative country – any style of country music that deviates from the normal, usually by incorporating elements found in alternative rock (particularly its personal lyrics).
- Alternative dance – a fusion of alternative rock and post-disco; usually contains alternative rock song structures and post-disco beats.
- Alternative hip-hop – any style of hip-hop that deviates from the norm, usually by possessing lyrics not usually found in mainstream hip-hop as well as musically combining it with other genres; despite its popularity among alternative rock fans, only some alternative rappers actually fuse hip-hop with that genre.
- Alternative metal – any style of heavy metal music that deviates from the norm, usually by incorporating elements found in alternative rock (particularly its melodic vocals). Many alternative metal bands also tend to either have funk or hip-hop influences.
- Alternative R&B – any style of contemporary R&B that deviates from the norm, usually by having a more electronic influence. Originally a synonymous term for neo soul, alternative R&B (which now only refers to styles originating from the 2000s), alternative R&B tries to expand beyond the conventions of genres altogether.
- Alternative reggaeton – any style of reggaeton that deviates from the norm.
- Alternative rock – any style of rock music that deviates from the norm, usually by having melodic vocals and personal lyrics; often applied to styles that sprang out following the initial punk rock music scene.
- Ambient music – a style of incredibly slow electronic music that uses long repetitive sounds to generate a sense of calm and atmosphere.
- Ambient house – a style of house music that contains the atmospheric musical textures of ambient music.
- Ambient pop – a style of dream pop with heavy ambient influence that developed in the 1980s.
- Ambient techno – a fusion of techno and ambient music.
- Ambrosian chant – plainsong used during the Ambrosian rite.
- American folk music – folk music developed in the United States.
- American folk-music revival – a musical revival of American folk music that occurred from the 1940s through the 1960s, resulting in contemporary folk music.
- Americana – music that invokes the musical ethos of the United States (i.e. roots rock).
- Anarcho-punk – punk rock with anarchist themes.
- Ancient music – music created in the early stages of literate cultures.
- Anglican chant – plainsong used by the Anglican church.
- Anatolian rock – a style of folk rock that fuses Turkish folk music with rock music.
- Anti-folk – a mocking style of folk that subverts the earnest, politically-informed lyrics of folk-revivalists.

=== Ap-Az ===
- Apala – Nigerian music originally used by the Yoruba people to wake worshippers after fasting during Ramadan.
- Appalachian music – American folk music originated from the Appalachia region that later became the basis for old-time music and country music.
- Arabesque – an Arabic style of music created in Turkey.
- Arabic pop music – pop music informed by traditional Arabic styles.
- Arena rock – any style of rock music inherently designed for large audiences (i.e. an arena); largely used as a pejorative label rather than as a description for an actual genre of rock.
- Argentine rock – rock music performed by Argentinian musicians.
- Armenian chant – chants used in the liturgy of the Armenian Apostolic Church.
- Ars antiqua – European music from the Late Middle Ages, which advanced concepts of rhythm.
- Ars nova – a style of French music from the Late Middle Ages, rejected fiercely by the Catholic Church.
- Ars subtilior – a style of French music from the Late Middle Ages.
- Art pop – pop music made purposefully to bring the genre to artistic heights.
- Art punk – punk rock made purposefully to bring the genre to artistic heights; sometimes considered a style of post-punk.
- Art rock – rock music made purposefully to bring the genre to artistic heights.
- Ashik – music performed by mystic or traveling Turkish, Azerbaijan, Georgian, Armenian, and Iranian bands, using vocals and the saz, performed since ancient times.
- Assyrian folk/pop music – pop, folk and dance music informed by traditional Assyrian styles.
- Atlanta hip-hop – hip-hop music in the music scene of Atlanta.
- Australian country music – country music performed by Australian musicians.
- Australian hip-hop – hip-hop performed by Australian musicians.
- Avant-funk – an avant-garde style of funk made purposefully to challenge the conventions of the genre.
- Avant-garde music – music considered to be ahead of its time, often using new, unusual, or experimental elements, or fusing pre-existing genres.
- Avant-garde jazz – an avant-garde style of jazz made purposefully to challenge the conventions of the genre; related and originally synonymous with free jazz, avant-garde jazz still maintains some form of structure and uses composed melodies.
- Avant-garde metal – an avant-garde style of heavy metal music made purposefully to challenge the conventions of the genre.
- Avant-pop – any avant-garde form of popular music that is experimental, new, and distinct from previous styles while retaining an immediate accessibility for the listener.
- Avant-prog – a style that appeared in the late 1970s as the extension of progressive rock, chiefly by being a fusion of its two subgenres: Rock in Opposition and the Canterbury scene.
- Avant-punk – punk rock made purposefully to challenge the conventions of the genre.
- Axé – a style of Salvadorian, Bahian, and Brazilian music informed by Afro-Cuban and Afro-Brazilian styles.
- Azonto – a dance and music genre from Ghana.

== B ==
=== Bac-Bal ===
- Bachata – an Afro-Dominican style waltz, consisting of despairing and romantic ballads, popular among Dominican artists.
- Baggy – the main music style of the Madchester scene that incorporates the psychedelic elements of acid house (particularly its deep bassline) into alternative rock.
- Baião – a Brazilian rhythmic formula built around the zabumba drum that later combined itself with elements of mestizo, European, and African styles.
- Bakersfield sound – a raw and gritty country music style significantly influenced by rock and roll that acted as a reaction against the slick, overproduced Nashville sound.
- Baila – a Sri Lankan style that began among the Afro-Sinhalese (or Kariff) community.
- Baisha xiyue – an orchestral Chinese style used by the Naxi people that is often found in Taoist or Confucian ceremonies.
- Bajourou – initially an acoustic style of Malian pop music played at gatherings (particularly weddings), which has since become mostly electronic.
- Bal-musette – 19th-century style of French accordion-based dance music.
- Balakadri – Guadeloupean music made from the quadrille, usually performed at balls.
- Balinese Gamelan – Javanese and Balinese style made from xylophones, drums, and plucked strings.
- Balearic beat – a style of house music that originated from the Balearic Islands.
- Balearic trance – a trance music subgenre which evolved from Balearic beat.
- Balkan brass – a Serbian music style made by soldiers that combined military brass with folk music.
- Ballad – usually slow, romantic, despairing and catastrophic songs.
- Ballata – 13th–15th-century Italian musical and poetic form based on an AbbaA structure that acted as a form of dance music.
- Ballet – a specific style of French classical music created to accompany the ballet dance.
- Baltimore club – a music style originated from Baltimore that combines hip-hop, breakbeat, and house music.

=== Bam-Bay ===
- Bambuco – a Colombian music style based on waltz and polska.
- Banda music – brass-based Mexican music.
- Bangladeshi hip-hop – a variety of styles of hip-hop music developed in Bangladesh.
- Bangsawan – a style of Malay opera based on Indian styles introduced by immigrants.
- Bantowbol – a Cameroonian style of accordion music.
- Barbershop music – a style of a capella close harmony vocal music that is generally performed in quartets.
- Barcarolle – a traditional music style from Italy sung by Venetian gondoliers.
- Bard (Soviet Union) – a style of Russian music made by singer-songwriters during the latter half of the Soviet era.
- Barn dance – folk music played in a barnhouse.
- Baroque music – a style of Western art music made between the 17th and 18th centuries characterized by its usage of the harpsichord and contrapuntal melodies.
- Baroque pop – a style of rock music originating from the 1960s that contains elements of Baroque music (particularly its instrumentation and contrapuntal melodies). As Baroque pop is usually not seen as being a pop music genre, it is sometimes referred to as baroque rock.
- Barynya – Russian folk music style.
- Bassline – a style of speed garage that combines elements of dubstep, particularly its emphasis on bass.
- Batá-rumba – Cuban rumba music that incorporates bata and guaguanco.
- Batucada – an African-influenced style of Brazilian samba.
- Baul – a style of folk music, specially in the Bengali region.

=== Bc-Bh ===
- Beach music – Californian genre from the 1950s that combined elements of all popular genres at the time, particularly big band and shag jazz.
- Beatdown hardcore – a mix of hardcore punk and heavy metal.
- Beat music – a style of rock and roll developed in the United Kingdom characterized by its strong, driving beat that emphasizes all the beats of a 4/4 bar; unlike British rock and roll, beat music was seen as being musically on par with American rock and roll and found success in the United States following the British Invasion.
- Beatboxing – a capella music created to emulate hip-hop beats.
- Beatlesque – artists who musically resemble the Beatles, such as Electric Light Orchestra, Oasis, and many power pop bands.
- Beautiful music – term of endearment for various easy listening genres.
- Bebop – a fast-paced style of jazz popular in the 1940s and 1950s that replaced the dance-oriented swing music; known for its complex chord progressions, instrumental virtuosity, and the predominant role of the rhythm section.
- Beguine/Biguine – a style from French territory in the Caribbean, Martinique island and precursor of jazz.
- Beiguan music – a style of Chinese traditional music popular in Taiwan and the province of Zhangzhou.
- Bel canto – a light, sophisticated style of Italian opera singing.
- Bend-skin – urban Cameroonian music.
- Beneventan chant – plainsong originated from Benevento.
- Benga music – Kenyan popular music based on Luo and Kikuyu folk music.
- Bent edge
- Berlin School of electronic music – heavily experimental electronic music that acted as a more avant-garde style of Krautrock and inspired ambient and New Age music.
- Bhajan – Hindu religious music.
- Bhangra – a popular style of Punjabi dance music that uses western instruments along with traditional Punjabi instruments; named after the dance of the same name.
- Bhangragga – a fusion of bhangra, reggae and dancehall.
- Bhangraton (Indian hip-hop) – a fusion of Bhangra music with reggaeton, which itself is a fusion of hip-hop, reggae, and traditional Latin American music.

=== Bi-Bo ===
- Big band – large orchestras which play a style of swing music.
- Big beat – a 1990s style of breakbeat that incorporates elements found in acid house (specifically its synthesizer basslines).
- Big room house
- Biguine – Guadeloupean folk music.
- Bihu – a popular folk music of Assam, India.
- Biker metal
- Biomusic – a style of experimental music which deals with sounds created or performed by living things.
- Bitpop – electronic music, where at least part of the music is made using old 8-bit computers, game consoles and little toy instruments. Popular choices are the Commodore 64, Game Boy, Atari 2600 and Nintendo Entertainment System.
- Blackened death metal – a fusion between death and black metal.
- Black metal – an extreme metal style known for its lo-fi recording, shrieking vocals, unconventional song structures and dark or supernatural lyrics.
- Blackgaze – a fusion style between black metal and shoegaze.
- Black MIDI – sheet music consisting of huge amounts of notes per instrument, generally written in digital MIDI format.
- Bluegrass music – a style of country music mixed with Irish/Scottish (via old-time music), and African-American (via blues and jazz) influences.
- Blue-eyed soul – soul music performed by white musicians.
- Blues – a style from the Mississippi Delta area known for its usually depressing lyrics and its unique song structure, using playing techniques such as blue notes, blues scales, and the twelve-bar chord progression.
- Blues ballad – a fusion of blues and folk.
- Blues rock – a fusion of blues (specifically electric blues) and rock music; usually contains blues song structures and rock instrumentation.
- Boi – Amazonian folk music.
- Bollywood songs
- Bongo Flava – East African Hip-Hop.
- Boogie – 1. a repetitive form of rhythm found in boogie-woogie. 2. a style of funk characterized by a mid-tempo post-disco rhythm, prominent use of slap bass, loud clapping sound, and its new wave melodic chords and synthesizers.
- Boogie rock – a style of blues rock that fuses rock music with boogie-woogie.
- Boogie-woogie – a danceable style of the blues centered on a specific form of rhythm called boogie.
- Boogaloo – a fusion of soul music and mambo.
- Boom bap – a subgenre and music production style that was prominent in East Coast hip-hop during the golden age of hip-hop from the late 1980s to the early 1990s.
- Bosnian root music – Bosnian rural roots music.
- Bossa Nova – a well-known style of Brazilian music, a lyrical fusion of samba and jazz.
- Bothy ballad – folk songs, sung and popularised by the farm workers in the Northeast of Scotland.
- Bounce music – energetic hip-hop music, native to New Orleans, frequently characterized by chromatic tics and "call and response" lyrics.
- Bouncy techno – an upbeat style of electronic dance music.

=== Br-Bu ===
- Brass – music performed with brass instruments, prior to the advent of jazz.
- Breakbeat – a style of electronic dance music built on previously recorded breaks.
- Breakbeat hardcore – a fusion of breakbeat and acid house.
- Breakcore – a fast and frantic style of breakbeat influenced by hardcore and industrial music that is known for its intentionally diverse range of samples.
- Breakstep
- Brega – a genre of Brazilian popular music.
- Breton – folk music of Brittany, France, known for its use of woodwind.
- Brill Building Sound – a distinct style of pop music developed in the Brill Building using Tin Pan Alley songwriting.
- Brit funk – funk performed by British musicians, often influenced by soul, jazz, and Caribbean music.
- Britpop – British alternative rock from the 1990s that subverted the depressing themes of the then-popular grunge movement in favor of jangly, optimistic music with lyrics often touching on the themes of partying and working class life. Despite its name, it is rarely viewed as a style of pop music.
- British blues – a style of electric blues developed by British musicians.
- British folk rock – associated with the folk revival of the 1960s, British folk rock tends to use modern, often electric, instruments alongside or in place of traditional and acoustic folk instruments.
- British Invasion – refers to a period where British musicians, primarily of the beat music movement along with some pop acts, became popular in America during the 1960s.
- British hip-hop – hip-hop originating from the United Kingdom.
- British rhythm and blues – rhythm and blues (as in the blues style) originating from the United Kingdom; usually more guitar driven than its original form.
- British rock music – rock music originating from the United Kingdom.
- British rock and roll – rock and roll originating from the United Kingdom; commonly viewed as being an inferior version of its original counterpart, its popularity was almost completely replaced by the much more lively beat music.
- Broken beat – a style of breakbeat played in a syncopated 4/4 rhythm with punctuated snare beats.
- Brooklyn drill – a regional subgenre of hip-hop that originated in Memphis, Tennessee in the mid-late 1980s.
- Brostep – an aggressive and metal-influenced style of dubstep popular in America.
- Brown-eyed soul – soul music performed by Latinos.
- Brukdown – Belizean music inspired by European harmonies, African rhythms, and the call-and-response format.
- Bubblegum pop – pop music known for its simplicity, happy and cute lyrics, and emphasis on image rather than substance.
- Buddhist music
- Bullerengue – a style of Colombian music with African rhythms and chants.
- Bikutsi – Cameroonian EDM, originating in the Beti community.
- Bulerías – fast-paced flamenco music.
- Bunraku – Japanese folk music often played at puppet theaters.
- Burger-highlife – a style of highlife played by Ghanaian-Germans.
- Burgundian School – a group of French, Belgian, and Dutch composers active in the 15th century, known for their secular forms.
- Bush ballad – Australian folk music often dealing with themes of Australian spirit and rebellion.
- Byzantine music – Greek music performed during the age of the Byzantine Empire; known for its ecclesiastical form (i.e. chants).

== C ==
=== Ca ===
- Ca din tulnic – Romanian folk music played with the alpenhorn.
- Ca trù – a style of Vietnamese chamber music performed by one lute player and a geisha-esque female singer, used to entertain wealthy audiences, who would be included in the performances, and to perform in religious ceremonies.
- Cabaret – an often jazz-informed style of music played at upbeat stageplays or burlesque shows.
- Cadence-lypso – a fusion of kadans and calypso.
- Cadence rampa – an upbeat style of kadans.
- Cải lương – modern Vietnamese folk opera.
- Cajun music – a style of American folk music developed by the Cajun people of Louisiana.
- Cakewalk
- Calinda – Trinidadian folk music played during practices of the martial art of the same name.
- Čalgija – Macedonian folk style.
- Calypso music – a Trinidadian popular music genre inspired by both African (via Kaiso) and French styles and is known for its lyrics dealing with the racist oppression of native Trinidadians at the time.
- Calypso-style baila – a fusion of baila and calypso.
- Campursari – Indonesian fusion genre, combining several folk styles with pop music.
- Can Can
- Canadian blues – blues performed by Canadians.
- Candombe – a fusion of African and Uruguayan styles developed by African-Uruguayan slaves in the 19th century.
- Canon – any music that combines a melody with copies of itself.
- Cantata – any music sung by a choir with instrumental backing.
- Cante chico – the vocal component to flamenco music.
- Cante jondo – flamenco music that incorporates deep vocals.
- Canterbury scene – a group of British avant-garde, progressive rock, and jazz fusion musicians based in the English city of Canterbury, Kent.
- Cantiñas – an upbeat style of Andalusian flamenco music.
- Cantiga – Portuguese ballad style from the Middle Ages.
- Canto livre – Portuguese folk music known for its far-left political messages.
- Cantopop – any Chinese pop music sung in Cantonese.
- Cantu a tenore – Sardinian style of polyphonic folk singing.
- Canzone Napoletana – Italian music sung in Neapolitan.
- Cape Breton fiddling – a Celtic style of fiddle playing.
- Capoeira music – Brazilian music played during performances of the martial art of the same name.
- Carimbó – music and dance from the northeast of Brazil.
- Cariso – Trinidadian folk music, often considered an early form of calypso.
- Carnatic music – Southern Indian classical music.
- Carol – a festive song, often sung on Christmas or, rarely, Easter.
- Cartageneras – a style of flamenco known for its focus on folklore.
- Carnavalito

=== Ce ===
- Celempungan – Sudanese folk music.
- Cello rock – rock music that incorporates cellos.
- Celtic chant – a style of Christian liturgy chant developed in Britain, Ireland and Brittany.
- Celtic fusion – any fusion that includes a Celtic music influence.
- Celtic metal – a style of folk metal/Celtic fusion that fuses Celtic music and heavy metal music.
- Celtic music – any music (usually folk music) of the Celts.
- Celtic punk – a Celtic fusion of Celtic music and punk rock.
- Celtic reggae – a fusion of Celtic and reggae music.
- Celtic rock – a Celtic fusion of Celtic music and folk rock.

=== Cha ===
- Cha-cha-cha – Cuban folk music.
- Chacarera – Argentinian folk and dance music.
- Chakacha – music of the Swahili people of Kenya and Tanzania.
- Chalga – a fusion of Bulgarian etno-pop and dance music with Eastern and Arab elements, popular in Southern Bulgaria.
- Chamamé – a style of Argentinian, Paraguayan, Mesopotamian, and Brazilian folk music.
- Chamarrita – a style of Argentinian and Uruguayan folk music.
- Chamber music – classical music performed for a small audience by a small orchestra.
- Chamber jazz – a fusion of chamber and jazz music.
- Chamber pop – a style of indie pop that incorporates elements of orchestral pop (particularly its usage of an orchestra) to recreate the sounds of baroque pop.
- Champeta – African-Colombian folk music.
- Changüí – Cuban music that fused African and Spanish styles.
- Chanson – French vocal-driven music.
- Chanson réaliste
- Chant – singing or speaking rhythmically to a very small number of pitches.
- Chap hop – a variety of music originating from England that mixes the hip-hop genre with elements from the Chappist or steampunk subcultures.
- Charanga – traditional Cuban dance music.
- Charanga-vallenata – a fusion of charanga, vallenata, and salsa.
- Charikawi – music accompanying the dance of the same name of the Garifuna people.
- Charleston (dance)
- Chastushka – humorous and fast-paced Russian and Ukrainian folk music.
- Chầu văn – a downtempo, trance-inducing style of Vietnamese folk music.

=== Che-Chi ===
- Chèo – a style of musical theater performed by Vietnamese peasants.
- Chicano rock – rock music (often either a form of rock and roll or a style of Latin rock) performed by Mexican-Americans. May or not be considered a form of rock en español, depending on whether the lyrics are sung in English or Spanish.
- Chicago blues – blues performed by Chicago inhabitants; considered the first form of electric blues.
- Chicago house – house music performed by Chicago inhabitants; considered the first form of house music.
- Chicago soul – soul music performed by Chicago inhabitants.
- Chicano rap – a subgenre of hip-hop that embodies aspects of the Mexican American or Chicano culture.
- Chicken scratch – a fusion of Native American, White American, Mexican, and European styles, performed by the Native American Tohono O'odham people.
- Children's music – any music (mostly folk music) marketed towards children.
- Chill-out music – any music with a slow tempo designed to calm people after raves; originally a synonymous term for ambient house.
- Chillwave – indie pop style known for its looped synths and calming effects.
- Chinese music – any music performed by Chinese people.
- Chinese rock – rock music performed by Chinese people, often fused with traditional styles.
- Chiptune – electronic music that is made on vintage computers/game systems or emulations thereof. May also refer to electronic music that uses samples from video games or vintage computers.

=== Cho-Chr ===
- Chopped and screwed – a technique of remixing music that involves slowing down the tempo and DJing.
- Chopper – a hip-hop subgenre that originated in the Midwestern United States and features fast-paced rhyming or rapping.
- Choro – fast-paced Brazilian pop music.
- Chouval bwa – Martinican folk music.
- Chowtal – North Indian folk music performed during the Phagwa or Holi festival.
- Christmas carol – carols performed during the Christmas season.
- Christmas music – any music tied to the Christmas season.
- Christian alternative rock – alternative rock with Christian themes.
- Christian country music – a fusion of Christian and country music.
- Christian hardcore – a fusion of Christian and hardcore punk rock.
- Christian hip-hop – hip-hop with Christian themes.
- Christian metal – a fusion of Christian and heavy metal rock.
- Christian music – music with overt Christian themes.
- Christian punk – a fusion of Christian and punk rock.
- Christian rock – rock music with Christian themes.
- Christian ska – ska music with Christian themes.
- Chylandyk – a style of throat singing performed by the Tuva people of Siberia, created to mimic the chirps of crickets.

=== Chu ===
- Chula – dance and music genre which originated in Portugal.
- Chumba – a folk and dance style of the Garifuna people of West Africa.
- Church music
- Chut-kai-pang – a fusion of chutney, calypso, and parang.
- Chutney music – Caribbean pop music that fuses calypso and cadence with several Indian styles.
- Chutney Soca – a fusion of chutney and soca music.

=== Ci-Cl ===
- Cifra
- Chap hop – a mix of hip-hop with elements from the Chappist or steampunk subcultures and stereotypical English obsessions such as cricket, tea, and the weather.
- Circus music – music made to accompany a circus.
- City pop - form of Japanese pop music that emerged in the mid-1970s and peaked in popularity during the 1980s
- Classic country – mainstream country and western music hits from past decades.
- Classic rock – rock music that begins in the 1950s and ends in the 2000s.
- Classic female blues – an early, vaudeville style of blues performed by female vocalists.
- Classical music – Western art music known for its use of large orchestras and staff notation.
- Classical period – a clearer, slicker style of Western art music performed in the 18th and 19th centuries, known for its emphasis on homophones and melody.
- Close harmony – any music with notes performed in a close range.
- Cloud rap – a subgenre of hip-hop that has several sonic characteristics of trap music with a hazy, dreamlike and relaxed production style.

=== Col-Cor ===
- Coladeira – Cape Verdean folk music.
- Coldwave – French post-punk.
- College rock – a radio format made by and made for college students that centers on alternative rock.
- Combined rhythm – Dutch Antillean folk music inspired by zouk, merengue, and soca.
- Comedy music – any music that incorporates heavy themes of humor and comedy.
- Comedy rap – a fusion of comedy and hip-hop music.
- Comedy rock – a comedic form of rock music.
- Comic opera – a fusion of comedy and opera music.
- Compas – a modernized style of Haitian meringue music.
- Complextro – typified by glitchy, intricate basslines and textures created by sharply cutting between instruments in quick succession.
- Concerto – a three-part classical piece in which one instrument takes lead and is backed by an orchestra.
- Concerto grosso – a style of baroque concerto in which the soloists and orchestra alternate playing.
- Conga – Cuban music played to accompany the dance of the same name.
- Conjunto – a fusion of Mexican and German styles developed by Mexican-Americans who had bought German instruments in Texas.
- Contemporary Christian music – pop music with overt Christian themes.
- Conscious hip-hop – a style of hip-hop that's, while not directly political like its successor genre political hip-hop, still talks about the struggles within the African-American community.
- Contemporary folk music – a modern style of Western folk music that sprang out of the American folk-music revival.
- Contemporary laïka – modernized and pop-informed style of laïka.
- Contemporary R&B – a modern style of rhythm and blues (as in the catch-all term for African-American popular music) that usually has an overall hip-hop/pop production style, electronic-backed rhythms, pitch-corrected vocals, and a smooth, lush style of vocal arrangement that heavily uses the melisma singing technique.
- Contradanza – 19th century Cuban dance music.
- Cool jazz – a relaxed, downtempo style of jazz heavily inspired by classical music, that existed as a reaction to the fast-paced bebop.
- Coon song – music about black stereotypes.
- Coptic music – music (usually chants) performed within the Coptic Orthodox Church; usually contains elements of local Egyptian music.
- Corrido – Mexican storytelling ballad.

=== Cou-Cow ===
- Country music – an American popular music genre originating from rural America with lyrics about the hardships of that culture that is played with acoustic guitars, steel guitars, banjos, fiddles, and harmonicas.
- Country blues – a rural, acoustic version of blues. As this style predates the existence of country music and only has lyrical similarities to that genre, it was renamed folk blues during the American folk-music revival.
- Country folk – a fusion of country and folk music.
- Country pop – a fusion of country and pop music.
- Country rap – a fusion of country and hip-hop music.
- Country rock – a style of roots rock that incorporates elements of country music, particularly its lyrics and usage of the steel guitar.
- Country trap – a fusion of country music and trap music
- Coupé-Décalé – Ivorian-French EDM drawing on zouk and African influences.
- Cowpunk – a fusion of country and punk rock music.

=== Cr-Cu ===
- Crabcore
- Creole music – folk music developed by the Louisiana Creole people.
- Cretan – Greek folk music performed by inhabitants of the island of Crete.
- Crossover thrash – a fusion of thrash metal and hardcore punk.
- Crunk – known for its heavy basslines and shouted, call-and-response vocals.
- Crunkcore – a fusion of crunk and screamo.
- Crust punk – a fusion of anarcho- and hardcore punk and extreme metal.
- Csárdás – Hungarian folk music.
- Cuarteto – Argentinian merengue music, originating in the city of Cordoba, and influenced also by Spanish and Italian styles.
- Cueca – Argentinian, Chilean, and Bolivian styles.
- Cumbia – a fusion of Colombian folk music and African and Spanish styles bought from slaves and colonists, respectively.
- Cumbia villera – cumbia performed by inhabitants of the shantytowns of Buenos Aires.
- Currulao
- Cyber Metal
- Czech bluegrass – Bluegrass music performed by Czech musicians.

== D ==
=== Da ===
- Dabke – Arabic folk dance music, often played at weddings.
- Dadra – light vocal style of Hindustani classical music, originating from the Bundelkhand region.
- Daina – Latvian folk music.
- Daina – Lithuanian folk music.
- Dance music – any music designed to make the listener dance.
- Dance-pop – a danceable style of pop music that contains post-disco rhythms.
- Dance-punk – a danceable style of post-punk and a form of electronic rock that contains disco rhythms.
- Dance-rock – a fusion of post-disco and post-punk; usually contains post-punk instrumentation and post-disco rhythms.
- Dancehall – Jamaican pop music that abandons reggae's roots influences for a slicker, EDM-inspired production.
- Dangdut – melodic and heavily optimistic style of Indonesian pop.
- Danger music – any music that will, somehow, potentially harm either the performers or the audience, linked heavily to noise rock.
- Dansband – Swedish folk music.
- Danza – Puerto Rican style of music that accompanies the ballroom-influenced dance of the same name.
- Danzón – Cuban dance music.
- Dappankuthu – Indian folk dance music, popular in the states of Karnataka and Tamil Nadu, often used as filmi music in the movies produced in those states.
- Dark ambient – a style of industrial music that takes elements from ambient music to create a feeling of dread and foreboding, rather than the relaxation given off by most ambient music.
- Dark cabaret – a fusion of cabaret and gothic rock.
- Darkcore – a chaotic and sinister style of jungle, which relied on pitch-shifting and horror movie audio samples.
- Darkstep – a style of darkcore jungle that takes its signature sinister feel and fuses it with upbeat breakbeats and ambient noises, creating an excessively chaotic tone.
- Dark wave – an excessively pessimistic style of post-punk, which relied on tales of realistic sorrow, rather than the fantasy elements of the then-popular gothic rock.

=== De-Dh ===
- De dragoste – Romanian love music.
- Deathcore – a fusion of death metal and metalcore.
- Deathgrind – a fusion of death metal and grindcore.
- Death industrial – a fusion of death and industrial metal, linked heavily to the power electronics scene.
- Death metal – extreme metal known for its distorted guitar structure, growling vocals, blast beat drumming and dark or violent lyrics.
- Death-doom – a fusion of death and doom metal.
- Death rock – a style of gothic rock known for its scratchy guitars, and lyrics focusing on supernatural and pessimistic themes, sometimes delving into intentionally campy horror themes.
- Décima – Hispanic genre of sung poetry.
- Deconstructed club – an experimental style of electronic dance music characterized by a post-modernist approach and an abrasive or dystopian tone.
- Delta blues – blues performed by inhabitants of the Mississippi Delta; considered the first form of blues.
- Deep funk
- Deep house – a style of Chicago house, inspired by jazz and soul music.
- Descarga – a genre of improvised Afro-Cuban music.
- Desi – a style of Hindustani classical raga, associated with the Asavari and Kafi thaat.
- Desi hip-hop – a term for music and culture which combines the influences of hip-hop and the Indian subcontinent.
- Detroit blues – blues music performed by inhabitants of Detroit, Michigan.
- Detroit drill – a subgenre of drill music, centered in Detroit, that began as a derivative of the drill music scene in Chicago and New York City and later became a derivative of UK drill with its 808 percussion and sliding notes by producers from the UK drill scene.
- Detroit techno – techno performed by inhabitants of Detroit, Michigan, USA.
- Dhamar – a tala used in Hindustani classical music, associated with the dhrupad style, and played on a pakhawaj.
- Dhrupad – a vocal style of Hindustani classical music, considered the oldest still being performed today.
- Dhun – a light instrumental style of Hindustani classical music.

=== Di-Dr ===
- Diablada – Telluric Bolivian folk music style.
- Digital hardcore – a fusion of hardcore punk and hardcore techno, known for its far-left lyrics.
- Dirge – a song of mourning, often played at a funeral.
- Dirty rap – hip-hop with sexual and pornographic themes.
- Disco – a style of dance music with elements of soul music, pop music and salsa music that originated from music venues that were popular with African Americans, Latino Americans, Italian Americans, LGBT people, and psychedelic hippies.
- Disco polo – Polish disco music.
- Diva house – a style of house popular in LGBT nightclubs.
- Dixieland – an early, possibly the first, style of jazz developed in New Orleans.
- Djent – a style of progressive metal known for its elastic power chords.
- Doina – Romanian folk music, informed by Middle Eastern styles.
- Dolewave – a style of alternative rock developed in Melbourne, Australia during the 2010s.
- Dondang Sayang – love ballads from the Malaysian state of Malacca, influenced by Portuguese styles.
- Donegal fiddle tradition – an Irish style of fiddle-playing from the Donegal county.
- Dongjing – Chinese traditional music of the Nakhi people of the Yunnan province.
- Donk – a style of UK hard house "featuring an upbeat, energetic sound and a heavy focus on the 'pipe' sample as an offbeat bassline".
- Doo-wop – a simplistic style of music known for its vocal harmonies and usually slow and smooth upbeat instrumentation.
- Doom metal – a style of heavy metal known for its low-tuned sound, slow tempos, clean and non-growled vocals and pessimistic lyrics.
- Downtempo – a slow-paced style of electronic music that differs from ambient music in that it also has a beat and rhythm. Sometimes treated as a synonym for trip hop, it differs from that genre by having a less "earthy" sound.
- Dream pop – an atmospheric and melodic style of neo-psychedelia designed to make the audience feel dreamy; despite its name, it is usually not considered a form of pop music.
- Dream trance – an early subgenre of trance music that peaked prominently on the international dance scene between 1995 and 1998 (colliding with the first time for trance to reach mainstream).
- Drift phonk – a subgenre of phonk, emerged in the late-2010s in Russia.
- Drill music – Chicago rap, see Drill (music genre) for more.
- Drill 'n' bass – a subgenre of drum and bass with elements of jungle and breakbeat music.
- Drone metal – a fusion of drone and heavy metal music.
- Drone music – an experimental, minimalist style of ambient music, known for drawn-out and repetitive tones, giving it a droning feel.
- Drum and bass – a jungle-derived style of electronic dance music known for rapid-fire breakbeats and heavy basslines.
- Drumstep – a fusion of drum and bass and dubstep.

=== Du ===
- Dub music – an electronic offshoot of reggae in which pre-existing recordings (usually the instrumental track of said recordings called riddim) are heavily remixed, resulting in an echoey, reverberating sound.
- Dub techno – a fusion of dub and techno.
- Dubtronica – a fusion of dub and EDM.
- Dubstep – a style of music that is known for its sparse, heavy basslines and dub-inspired reverberating drums.
- Dubstyle – a fusion of dubstep and hardstyle.
- Dungeon synth – an electronic genre fusing black metal and dark ambient.
- Dunun – family of West African drums.
- Dunedin Sound – a style of indie pop based in Dunedin, New Zealand.
- Dutch jazz – jazz performed by Dutch musicians.

== E ==
=== Ea-Ep ===
- Early music – any music made from the prehistoric era until the advent of baroque music.
- East Coast hip-hop – hip-hop originating from the American East Coast (largely New York City); considered the first form of hip-hop music.
- Easy listening – a popular music genre and radio format known for its slower tempo and the large prominence of strings.
- Electric blues – any style of blues played with electric instruments, most notably the electric guitar.
- Electro – a style of boogie which intentionally sounds robotic and computer-like that later incorporated the rhythms of hip-hop.
- Electrogrind – a fusion of grindcore and industrial.
- Electro house
- Electro-industrial – a style of post-industrial which used heavily produced and layered synths.
- Electro swing – a fusion of EDM and swing-jazz.
- Electroacoustic music
- Electroclash – a fusion of 1980s synthpop and 1990s techno.
- Electronic body music – EDM-informed style of post-industrial.
- Electronic dance music – EDM; any style of electronic music that is largely designed to be dance to.
- Electronic music – music that uses electronic instruments, such as the synthesizer, Theremin, and computer.
- Electronic rock – refers to any style of rock music that contains elements of electronic music (usually its usage of the synthesizer), although the term is largely limited to certain styles.
- Electronica – a type of music that is produced using electrical instruments such as synthesizers, electronic percussion.
- Electronicore – a fusion of electronic and post-hardcore/metalcore music.
- Electropop – a style of synth-pop that leans more towards the electronic music side than the pop music side.
- Electropunk – a fusion of electronic and punk music.
- Emo – heavily emotional and pessimistic style of post-hardcore, as well as indie rock in its subsequent form.
- Emo pop – a fusion of emo and pop punk.
- Emo rap – a fusion of emo and indie rock qualities with hip-hop.
- English folk music – folk music of England.
- Enka – a popular, modern adaptation of traditional Japanese music.

=== Er-Ex ===
- Eremwu eu – work songs of the female bakers of the Garifuna people of West Africa.
- Ethereal wave – atmospheric style of dark wave.
- Extratone
- Ethiopian chant – liturgical chant practiced by the Ethiopian Orthodox Tewahedo Church.
- Eurobeat – antecedent to Italo disco.
- Eurodance – European dance music and evolution of Euro disco that adapted elements of house and hi-NRG.
- Euro disco – disco originating from Europe.
- Euro house – European house music, usually a house-based style of Eurodance or Euro disco.
- Europop – pop music originating from Europe.
- Euro reggae – A variation of reggae fusion from Europe
- Eurotrance – European trance music, usually a fusion of Eurodance with uplifting trance and/or hard trance.
- Exotica – a style of easy listening that is meant to invoke the sounds of exotic locations (mostly Oceania) using non-Western instruments such as the Congo drum.
- Experimental music – any music that breaches contemporary standards of music.
- Experimental pop – an experimental style of pop music which attempts to push elements of existing popular forms into new areas.
- Experimental rock – rock music that experiments with the basic elements of the genre.
- Expressionist music
- Extempo – a lyrically improvised style of calypso music.
- Extreme metal – any aggressive, non-commercial style of heavy metal music.

== F ==
=== Fa-Fo ===
- Fado – Portuguese folk music, often touching on the themes of melancholia and working class struggles.
- Falak music – Afghan, Tajik, and Pakistani religious folk music.
- Fandango – Spanish music made to accompany the upbeat dance of the same name.
- Farruca – a light style of flamenco.
- Festejo – a style of Afro-Peruvian music.
- Fife and drum blues – a fusion of Hill country blues and martial music that is performed typically with one lead fife player and a troop of drummers.
- Filk music – style of folk (sometimes expanding to other genres) with heavy science-fiction or fantasy themes.
- Film score – any music written to act as a soundtrack to a motion picture.
- Filmi – Hindi film songs.
- Filmi-ghazal – a fusion of filmi and ghazal poetry.
- Fingerstyle – the act of plucking guitar strings with the fingertips.
- Flamenco – a popular style of Spanish folk dance music developed in Andalusia by Romani-Spanish (or Gitanos), but later expanding to the general Spanish populace.
- Flashcore – a genre that grew out of speedcore and industrial hardcore
- Florida breaks – a regional style of breakbeat developed in Florida that is centered on rhythms usually found in hip-hop music.
- Folk jazz – a style of folk music (as in contemporary folk music) that contains elements of jazz, particularly its emphasis on musical solos.
- Folk metal – a fusion of folk music and heavy metal.
- Folk music – music which usually has a bouncy and western-like feel to it.
- Folk pop – a fusion of folk and pop music.
- Folk punk – a fusion of folk and punk rock.
- Folk rock – a fusion of folk music (as in contemporary folk music) and rock music; usually contains folk song structures and rock instrumentation.
- Folktronica – a fusion of folk music and electronic music.
- Forró – popular Brazilian folk dance music.
- Foxtrot
- Fuji- A popular west African Yoruba music

=== Fr ===
- Freakbeat – a frantic, raw style of beat and British Invasion music.
- Freak folk – experimental style of folk, often folk-rock.
- Free improvisation – 1. completely uncontrolled musical improvisation; 2. an offshoot of free jazz.
- Free jazz – a style of jazz that takes the genre's usage of musical improvisation to the extreme, almost to the point of eliminating jazz's other elements. Related and originally synonymous with avant-garde jazz, free jazz is completely improvisational.
- Free tekno – a style of techno developed by anarchists.
- Freestyle music – a form of electronic dance music that emerged in the New York metropolitan area, Philadelphia, and Miami, primarily among Black Americans, Hispanic Americans, and Italian Americans.
- French house – house music originating from France that usually tries to emulate the genre that house music sprang out of: disco.
- Frevo – Brazilian dance styles associated with the Brazilian Carnivale.

=== Fu ===
- Fuji music – Nigerian folk music.
- Full-on – style of psychedelic trance known for its rolling baselines and confrontational themes.
- Funaná – Cape Verdean accordion-based dance music.
- Funeral doom – an incredibly slow style of doom metal, made to mimic funeral music.
- Funeral march
- Funk – a popular music genre that combines blues (via rhythm and blues), jazz, and soul music and is known for its de-emphasis towards melodies and harmonies in favor of the bassline.
- Funk carioca – a Brazilian hip-hop-influenced music genre from Rio de Janeiro, taking influences from musical styles such as Miami bass and freestyle.
- Funk melody – a fusion genre of funk carioca and Latin freestyle.
- Funk metal – a style of funk rock and a form of alternative metal that fuses funk with heavy metal music.
- Funk ostentação – a Brazilian music style created in São Paulo in 2008. Strongly influenced by American hip-hop, the central theme addressed in the songs is conspicuous consumption, and many funk ostentação artists sing about cars, motorcycles, drink, women, and ambitions to leave the favela and achieve life goals.
- Funk ousadia – a subgenre of the wider Brazilian funk scene, originating around 2013 in the city of São Paulo as an offshoot of the funk ostentação movement.
- Funk rock – a fusion of funk and rock music; usually contains rock guitar riffs and funk basslines.
- Funky house – a fusion of funk and house music.
- Furniture music – a calming, live style of background music.
- Future bass – a genre that stems from trap, juke, and UK garage, often containing 808 drums and sawtooth synths.
- Future funk
- Future garage – a style of UK garage known for its off-kilter rhythmic production.
- Future soul
- Futurepop – a style of EDM known for its similarities to synthpop, EBM and uplifting trance, as well as its heavy sampling.

== Next sections ==
- Section G–M | Section N–R | Section S–Z
