= List of styles of music: S–Z =

This is a partial list of music genres and styles, covering entries from the letters S to Z.

For the other sections, see Section A–F, Section G–M and Section N–R.

== S ==
=== Sa–Sb ===
- Sabar – drumming style found in Senegal.
- Sacred harp – a tradition of sacred choral music that originated in New England and was later perpetuated and carried on in the American South.
- Sadcore – an alternative name for slowcore.
- Salsa dura – a style of salsa music that places more emphasis on the instrumental part of the music.
- Salsa music – a fusion of multiple Cuban- and Puerto Rican-derived popular music genres from immigrants in New York City.
- Salsa romántica – a soft, romantic form of salsa music.
- Saltarello
- Samba – a form of Brazilian popular music and dance characterized by its 2/4 time signature varied with the conscious use of a sung chorus to a batucada rhythm. Considered a symbol of Brazil and the Brazilian Carnival.
- Samba-canção – traditional samba in slow tempo and with romantic lyrics. influenced by bolero.
- Samba-reggae – a genre of samba with a choppy, reggae-like rhythm.
- Samba rock – a style of samba that contains rock music instrumentation, funk basslines, and soul music vocals.
- Sambai
- Sambass
- Sampledelia – any music which heavily use sampling (i.e. electronic music and/or hip-hop).
- Sampling – reusing a portion of a sound recording in another recording; considered a foundation of hip-hop.
- Sanjo – Korean instrumental folk music.
- Sârbă – Romanian folk dance style.
- Sardana – Traditional Music of Catalonia.
- Sato kagura
- Sawt – urban music from Kuwait and Bahrain.
- Saya – Bolivian music derived from African rhythms.

=== Sc–Sh ===
- Schlager music
- Schottische
- Scottish Baroque music
- Scottish folk music – folk music of the Scottish people; part of the Celtic music umbrella.
- Scrumpy and Western – folk music from West Country of England.
- Screamo – an aggressive style of emo which employs screamed vocals.
- Sea shanty – English folk music of the sea.
- Sean-nós singing – type of traditional Irish singing.
- Seapunk
- Second Viennese School
- Sega music
- Seggae
- Seis – type of Puerto Rican dance music.
- Semba – traditional type of music from Angola.
- Sephardic music
- Serialism
- Sertanejo music – folk music from the East of Brazil.
- Set dance
- Sevdalinka – Bosnian urban popular music.
- Sevillana
- Shabda
- Shalakho – Armenian folk dance.
- Shan'ge – Taiwanese Hakka mountain songs.
- Shibuya-kei
- Shidaiqu – Hong Kong-based form of traditional music updated for pop audiences and sung in Mandarin.
- Shima-uta – folk songs from the Amami Islands, Japan.
- Shock rock
- Shoegaze – a style of Neo-psychedelia characterized by an ethereal mixture of obscured vocals, guitar distortion and effects, feedback, and overwhelming volume.
- Shōka – Japanese songs written during the Meiji Restoration to bring Western music to Japanese schools.
- Shomyo – Japanese Buddhist chanting.
- Shota – Albanian folk dance.
- Show tune

=== Si–Sn ===
- Siguiriyas
- Silat – Malaysian mixture of music, dance and martial arts.
- Sinawi – Korean religious music meant for dancing; it is improvised and reminiscent of jazz
- Singer-songwriter – a musician who writes, composes, and performs their own material.
- Ska – a Jamaican music genre that combined elements of Caribbean mento and calypso music with American jazz and rhythm and blues; characterized by a walking bass line accented with rhythms on the off beat.
- Ska punk – fusion of punk rock and ska.
- Skald
- Skate punk – punk rock subgenre that features elements of hardcore punk, melodic hardcore and pop punk. Popular amongst skaters, surfers or skiers.
- Skweee – a musical style, with origin in Sweden and Finland.
- Skiffle
- Skyladiko – pop folk music style of Greece.
- Skullstep
- Slack-key guitar (kihoalu) – Hawaiian form invented by retuning open strings on a guitar.
- Slängpolska
- Slide music
- Slowcore – a fusion of indie rock and sadcore. As its name applies, slowcore tends to deliver the bleak lyrics of sadcore with downbeat melodies and slow tempo.
- Sludge metal – a subgenre of heavy metal with slow-tuned tempos, abrasive distortion and harsh vocals. Basically a fusion of doom metal and hardcore punk.
- Smooth jazz
- Smooth soul – a style of soul music characterized by melodic hooks, funk influence (specifically its beat) and smooth production.
- Snap music – a subgenre of hip-hop derived from crunk that originated in southern United States in the 2000s, in Bankhead, West Atlanta, United States.
- Snap&B – a fusion of snap music and R&B.

=== So–Ss ===
- Soca music
- Soft rock – an offshoot of pop rock that relies on simple, melodic songs with big, lush productions.
- Son-batá – Batá rock music
- Son cubano
- Son montuno – Cuban folk music.
- Sonata
- Songo music – a mixture of changuí and son montuno.
- Songo-salsa – a mixture of songo, hip-hop and salsa.
- Sophisti-pop – British pop music made in the 1980s that incorporated elements of jazz and soul music (specifically their usage of the brass section); known for its extensive use of the synthesizer.
- Soukous – various ensemble sizes may be used, with upwards of three guitars sometimes employed simultaneously. Prominent horn and vocal arrangements are occasionally incorporated as well.
- Soul blues – a style of electric blues that incorporates elements of soul music, particularly its tense and raw vocals.
- Soul jazz
- Soul music – a popular African-American music genre that combines gospel music and rhythm and blues (as in the blues style); known for its tense and raw vocals which are backed by a brass section.
- Sound poetry
- Soundtrack
- Southern Gospel
- Southern Gothic music – a style of alternative country lyrically inspired by the Southern Gothic literary genre.
- Southern Harmony
- Southern hip-hop – hip-hop originating from the American South (especially Atlanta, New Orleans, Houston, Memphis, and Miami). The most popular form of hip-hop as of late.
- Southern metal
- Southern rock – roots rock originating from the American South that usually contains long jam sessions centered on the boogie rhythm.
- Southern soul – soul music originating from the American South that usually has a stronger gospel influence and overall deeper sound than other soul.
- Sovietwave
- Space age pop – a subgenre of pop music and easy listening inspired by and associated with the space age of the 1950s and 1960s.
- Space disco
- Space music – a subgenre of new-age music meant to evoke a feeling of contemplative spaciousness.
- Space rock – an offshoot of psychedelic rock characterized by loose and lengthy song structures centered on instrumental textures that typically produce a hypnotic, otherworldly sound.
- Spectralism
- Speedcore
- Speed garage – a genre of electronic dance music, associated with the UK garage scene, of which it is regarded as one of its subgenres.
- Speed metal
- Spirituals – a genre of African-American Christian music linked with the hardships of slavery; serves the basics of both blues and gospel music.
- Spoken word – any audio that features vocals that is neither singing nor rapping.
- Spouge – Barbadian folk music.
- Sprechgesang
- Square dance
- Sri Lankan hip-hop – a part of the Asian hip-hop culture.

=== St–Sx ===
- St. Louis blues – a form of blues developed in St. Louis that tends to be more piano-based than others.
- Steelband
- Stenchcore
- Stoner metal
- Stoner rock
- Straight edge music
- Strathspey
- Stride
- String music – Thai pop music.
- String quartet
- Sufi music
- Suite
- Sunshine pop – a style of pop music developed in California that combined the nostalgic moods of easy listening with an appreciation for the beauty of the world.
- Suomirock
- Super Eurobeat
- Surf music
- Swamp blues – a style of blues developed in Baton Rouge that is heavily influenced by Zydeco and Cajun music.
- Swamp pop – a style of pop music developed by Cajun teenagers in the 1950s that combines Cajun music with rock and roll and rhythm and blues (specifically New Orleans rhythm and blues).
- Swamp rock – a fusion of rockabilly, soul music, swamp blues, country music and funk.
- Swing – 1. a general "feel" of the rhythm within jazz musicians; 2. a specific rhythm pattern that involves alternately lengthening and shortening the pulse-divisions in a rhythm.
- Swing music – a danceable form of jazz that places heavy emphasis on both definitions of swing, which is what the form is named after.

=== Sy–Sz ===
- Sygyt – type of xoomii (Tuva throat singing), likened to the sound of whistling.
- Symphonic black metal
- Symphonic metal
- Symphonic poem
- Symphonic rock
- Symphony
- Synth-pop – a style of new wave music and a form of electronic music that centers on the synthesizer as the dominant musical instrument. Originally an intentionally cold-sounding genre, later synth-pop artists incorporated elements of pop music into it, resulting in a more upbeat sound.
- Synth-punk – a style of punk rock that uses synthesizers rather than guitars. Sometimes considered a form of electronic rock.
- Synthwave – a style of music that takes most of its inspiration from synth music and pop culture from the 1980s. Musically, synthwave is often instrumental and has a "futuristic" theme, with large, throbbing, retro synths.
- Syrian chant – chant used in Syriac Christianity.

== T ==
- Taarab
- Tai tu – Vietnamese chamber music.
- Taiwanese opera
- Taiwanese pop – early Taiwanese pop music influenced by enka and popular with older listeners.
- Tala – a rhythmic pattern in Indian classical music.
- Talempong – a distinct Minangkabau gamelan music.
- Talking blues
- Tamborito – folk music style from Panama.
- Tambu – music genre and dance form, found in Aruba, Bonaire and Curaçao.
- Tamburitza
- Tamil Christian keerthanai – Christian devotional lyrics in Tamil.
- Táncház – Hungarian dance music.
- Tango music – Argentine and Uruguayan popular music that spread internationally in the 1920s.
- Tanguk – a form of Korean court music that includes elements of Chinese music.
- Tappa
- Taqwacore
- Tarana – style of music from northern India using highly rhythmic nonsense syllables.
- Tarantella
- Tarantas
- Tech house
- Tech trance
- Technical death metal
- Technical metal
- Techno – a style that emerged from Detroit, Michigan known for its repetitive rhythm.
- Technoid
- Techstep
- Techtonik
- Tecno brega
- Teen pop – a subgenre of pop music targeted towards pre-teen and teenage listeners.
- Tejano music or "Tex-Mex" – an American form of Norteño originating among the Mexican-American populations of Central and Southern Texas; considered a part of American folk music.
- Tembang sunda – Sundanese sung free verse poetry.
- Texas blues – a form of blues developed in Texas that originally had swing influences, but later became a form of blues rock.
- Theatre music – music made for performance in theatres.
- Theme music
- Thillana – form of vocal music from South India using highly rhythmic nonsense syllables.
- Third Stream – jazz and classical music fusion style.
- Third wave ska.
- Thirty-two-bar form.
- Thrashcore.
- Thrash metal – a style of extreme metal known for its fast tempos, screaming vocals, extended guitar solos and aggressive lyrics.
- Thumri – a type of popular Hindustani vocal music.
- Tibetan pop – pop music heavily influenced by Chinese forms, emerging in the 1980s.
- Tientos – style of organ music from the 15th century in Spain.
- Timbila – form of folk music in Mozambique.
- Tin Pan Alley – a name given to the collection of New York City music publishers and songwriters who dominated the popular music of the United States in the late 19th century and early 20th century; one of the major sources for traditional pop.
- Tinku – traditional music and dance from Potosi Bolivia.
- Toeshey – Tibetan dance music.
- Togaku.
- Tondero – folk music style from Peru.
- T'ong guitar – acoustic guitar pop music of Korea.
- Traditional bluegrass – modern bluegrass music that emphasizes its original elements.
- Traditional Nordic dance music – upbeat style of Nordic folk.
- Traditional pop – pop music that predates the existence of rock and roll; usually has a swing influence due to that genre's prominence at that time. Later classified as a form of easy listening.
- Trallalero – Genoese urban songs.
- Trance music – a style of electronic dance music characterized by a tempo lying between 110 and 150 bpm (BPM), repeating melodic phrases, and a musical form that distinctly builds tension and elements throughout a track often culminating in 1 to 2 "peaks" or "drops".
- Trap metal – a subgenre of trap music that features elements and inspiration from various metal and hardcore punk genres, as well as elements of other genres, like industrial and nu metal.
- Trap music (EDM)
- Trap music (hip hop)
- Tread rap – a trap music subgenre.
- Tribal house
- Trival – a fusion of electronic dance music with cumbia or certain rhythms from regional Mexican music genres.
- Trikitixa – Basque accordion music.
- Trip hop – a hip-hop-influenced genre of electronic music that is known for its melancholy sound and a bass-heavy drumbeat. Sometimes treated as a synonym for downtempo, it differs from that genre by having a more "earthy" sound.
- Tropicalia
- Tropical music – Latin music originating from the Caribbean.
- Tropical house – a mix of reggae and house sounds originated in the late 2000s.
- Tropipop
- Truck-driving country
- Tumba
- Turbo-folk – aggressive form of modernized Serbian music.
- Turntablism – music produced by flipping a record to produce a rhythm.
- Tuvan throat-singing
- Twee pop
- Twelve-bar blues – a distinctive form predominantly based on the I-IV-V chords of a key.
- Twist (also a dance style, early 1960s)
- Two-tone (usually spelled 2 Tone) – a style of ska that incorporates elements of punk rock and new wave music, particularly their high-paced tempo; produced by and named after the record label of the same name, most two-tone music tends to have lyrics that promotes racial harmony.

== U ==
- UK bass – club music that emerged in the United Kingdom during the mid-2000s under the influence of genres such as house, grime, dubstep, UK garage, R&B, and wonky.
- UK drill – a subgenre of drill music and road rap that originated in the South London district of Brixton from 2012 onwards.
- UK garage – a style of electronic music and an offshoot of garage house that usually features a distinctive 4/4 percussive rhythm with chopped up vocal samples.
- UK hardcore
- UK hard house
- UK rap – a variety of styles of hip-hop made in the United Kingdom.
- Unblack metal – black metal with lyrics that praise Christianity rather than criticizing it as opposed to black metal, which traditionally focuses on Satanism or anti-Christianity.
- Underground music – music with practices perceived as outside, or somehow opposed to, mainstream popular music culture.
- Uplifting trance.
- Urban contemporary music – a music radio format, coined by New York radio DJ Frankie Crocker in the early to mid-1970s as a synonym for Black music.
- Urban Cowboy – a soft, mellow style of music that uses harmonious vocals with smooth synth sounds or rarely no music at all.
- Urban Pasifika – a blend of hip-hop, reggae, and traditional Polynesian musical styles.

== V ==
- Vallenato – accordion-based Colombian folk music.
- Vaporwave
- Vaudeville – a form of theatre featuring unrelated acts, including performers of popular and/or classical music, that became a popular form of entertainment in the United States until the rise of film.
- Verbunkos – Hungarian dance music.
- Verismo
- Video game music – melodic music as defined by its media.
- Viking metal
- Viking rock
- Villanella – 16th century Neapolitan songs.
- Virelais
- Visual kei – Japanese music scene, started around the 1980s.
- Visual music
- Vocal house
- Vocal jazz
- Vocal music
- Vocaloid – a voice synthesis software that uses voice synthesis algorithms rather than simple sound banks, allowing it to emulate different vocal styles.
- Volksmusik

== W ==
- Waiata – traditional Māori music
- Waila (chicken scratch) – a Tohono O'odham fusion of polka, norteño and Native American music.
- Walking bass – a style of bass accompaniment which creates a feeling of regular quarter note movement, akin to the regular alternation of feet while walking.
- Wall of Sound – a music production technique developed by Phil Spector in which a large number of musicians (including an orchestra) perform the same parts in unison and the resulting sound is re-recorded in an echo chamber. Used mostly by Spector himself for artists signed to his pop music label, along with some rock acts inspired by this style of production (most notably Brian Wilson of the Beach Boys).
- Waltz
- Wangga – Aboriginal Australian music genre.
- Warabe uta
- Wassoulou music – performed mostly by women. Some recurring themes in the lyrics are childbearing, fertility, and polygamy. Instrumentation includes soku, djembe drum, kamalen n'goni, karinyan and bolon.
- War song
- Waulking song – Scottish folk songs, typically sung in Gaelic. These songs were often sung by women as they worked to soften woven tweed by hitting it against a solid surface, which would give the song rhythm.
- Were music – indigenous Yoruba music.
- West Coast blues – a form of jump blues developed in California by Texas blues musicians who moved there.
- West Coast hip-hop – hip-hop originating from the western United States (largely Los Angeles); the first form of hip-hop not to originate from the East Coast.
- West Coast jazz
- Western blues
- Western swing – an up-tempo danceable form of country music that is heavily influenced by swing music.
- Witch house
- Wizard rock – subgenre of geek rock with lyrics and themes specifically about the Harry Potter series.
- Women's music or womyn's music, wimmin's music – 1970s lesbian/feminist music.
- Wong shadow – 1960s Thai pop music.
- Wonky – music with shaky off-kilter beats that came out of the 90s.
- Work song
- Worldbeat – a music genre that combines rock and pop music with music that is usually labeled as world music.
- World music – music originating outside the Western world (although the term has occasionally been applied to various forms of Western folk music). This may also include Latin music, music from the Caribbean, and regional forms of Western popular music that are performed in non-Western languages but are otherwise nearly indistinguishable in style.

== X ==
- Xinyao - contemporary Mandarin vocal music and grassroots folk-pop
- Xoomii – a style of music which is produced by rolling the throat in ways to create an instrument-like sound to it.
- Xote – is a Brazilian music genre and dance for pairs or groups of four.
- Xhosa music

== Y ==
- Yass – a style of Polish music from the 1980s and 1990s.
- Yayue
- Yé-yé – French music that emerged from the 60s.
- Yo-pop – a style of music, popularized in the 1980s by Segun Adewale.
- Yodeling
- Youth crew
- Yukar

== Z ==
- Zajal
- Zamacueca – Peruvian folk dance of African origins and precursor of Zamba.
- Zamba – Argentinian folk dance and music genre.
- Zamrock
- Zapin – derived from ancient Arabic music, zapin is popular throughout Malaysia.
- Zarzuela – a form of Spanish operetta.
- Zeuhl
- Zeibekiko – Greek Dance 9/8 Rytmus.
- Zef – South African music based on both rap and rave.
- Ziglibithy – music from the Côte d'Ivoire made by people like Ernesto Djedje.
- Znamenny chant – a unison, melismatic chant used in the Russian Orthodox Church.
- Zouglou
- Zouk – French Caribbean (Guadeloupean) dance music.
- Zouk Love – performed at a slower tempo than traditional zouk music (between 95 and 100 bpm) and is smoother, more sentimental and quieter overall.
- Zulu music
- Zydeco – a Louisianan traditional musical style centered on the accordion and the washboard.

== Previous sections ==
- Section A–F | Section G–M | Section N–R
