= Chicken scratch (disambiguation) =

Chicken scratch (or waila music) is music of the Tohono O'odham people of Arizona and Northern Mexico.

Chicken scratch may also refer to:

- Chicken scratch (food), chicken feed
- Chicken scratch embroidery, a form of cross-stitch embroidery done on gingham fabric, also known as "depression lace" or "snowflaking"
- Chicken scratch guitar, a style of rhythm guitar playing associated with funk music
- Chicken scratching, penmanship that is very close to illegible
- "It's all chicken scratch to me", a synonym for "It's all Greek to me" in various languages
