= Happy Peanuts =

Curaçaoan band

Happy Peanuts is a well known band from the island of Curaçao. Their styles include local tumba and combined rhythm, as well as Dominican merengue. One of the driving forces of modern tumba and combined rhythm, Happy Peanuts blends driving congas and timbales with synthesizer and electric guitar. Also unique to Happy Peanuts is their style of merengue. Because there is no güira player, the pattern is instead played on the hi-hat by the drumset player.

Their most well known song continues to be "Kareda di Buriku" (Donkey Race), which is synonymous to the culture of Curaçao, and is a very popular dance song.
