= List of styles of music: N–R =

This is a partial list of music genres and styles, covering entries from the letters N to R.

For the other sections, see Section A–F, Section G–M and Section S–Z.

== N ==
=== Na-Ne ===
- Nagauta – Japanese music that accompanies kabuki theater.
- Nakasi – Japanese and Taiwanese folk music.
- Nangma – Tibetan EDM.
- Nanguan music – Chinese classical music that is heavily influenced by Western styles.
- Narcocorrido – Mexican polka-influenced folk music with lyrics focusing on illegal activity.
- Nardcore – hardcore and skate punk style based in Oxnard, California.
- Narodna muzika – Bosnian, Bulgarian, Macedonian, and Serbian folk music.
- Nasheed – Islamic vocal music, usually sung a capella, or accompanied by a daff.
- Nashville sound – a slick, pop-informed 'radio friendly' style of American country music that began in Nashville, Tennessee.
- National Socialist black metal – Black Metal espousing National Socialism.
- Nazi punk
- Nederpop – Dutch pop music.
- Neoclassical – orchestral music of the early 20th century.
- Neoclassical dark wave – fusion of neoclassical and dark wave music.
- Neo-classical metal – fusion of neoclassical and heavy metal music.
- Neoclassical new age – fusion of neoclassical and new age music.
- Neo kyma – style of classical Greek music from the 1960s with French influences.
- Neofolk – fusion of folk rock and post-industrial music.
- Neo-Medieval music – music that attempts to imitate Medieval and earlier periods of classical music.
- Neo-prog – highly theatrical, emotional, and clean style of progressive rock.
- Neo-psychedelia – a loose term for music (usually either alternative rock or new wave music) inspired by earlier psychedelic music.
- Neo soul – a modern style of soul music that differs from standard contemporary R&B by having a less conventional sound that focuses on more soulful and emotive vocals and lyrics. Originally referred to as alternative R&B, neo soul (which originated in the 1990s) is firmly considered to be a soul genre first and foremost.
- Neotraditional country – alternative country music that attempts to imitate pre-Nashville 'traditional' country.
- Nepalese hip-hop – the Nepalese form of hip-hop.
- Nerdcore – hip-hop with lyrics concerning typically 'nerdy' subjects.
- Neue Deutsche Härte – a German fusion style of Neue Deutsche Welle and industrial music that mainly takes elements of alternative and groove metal.
- Neue Deutsche Welle – new wave music performed by Germans.
- Neue Deutsche Todeskunst – German dark wave and Gothic rock.
- Neurofunk – more advanced style of techstep.
- New-age music – a style of ambient music intended for use during meditation; strongly linked to the new age movement.
- New Beat – Belgian downtempo and acid house.
- New jack swing – the beats are generally quite up-tempo and aggressive.
- New Mexico music – a blend of Pueblo and Hispano folk music with Mexican, Latin, and American folk/pop genres.
- New Orleans blues – a Dixieland-influenced style of blues developed in New Orleans.
- New Orleans rhythm and blues – rhythm and blues originating from New Orleans that heavily uses the piano and horns.
- New prog – more ambitious and alternative rock-inspired style of progressive rock.
- New rave – a fusion of indie rock and dance-punk.
- New school hip-hop – hip-hop music made after the mid-80s.
- New Taiwanese Song – Taiwanese pop music.
- New wave music – a style of rock music that developed alongside punk rock and is known for heavy usage of electronic instruments and distinctive music videos.
- New wave of new wave – an alternative rock-led revival of new wave music that occurred in 1990s Britain.
- New Weird America – term for the, often psychedelic-informed, indie folk music of the 2000s.

=== Ni-Nu ===
- Nintendocore – fusion of chiptune and metalcore.
- Nisiotika – Greek music from the Aegean Islands.
- Nitzhonot – a form of Goa trance, fused with uplifting trance, that emerged during the mid-late 1990s in Israel.
- No wave – an avant-garde style of punk rock that rejected punk's adherence to basic rock elements, which usually resulted in most no wave music having abrasive atonal sounds and repetitive, driving rhythms. Despite its name being a play on words off of new wave music, no wave has little to do with that genre.
- Noh – long, highly dramatic Japanese opera.
- Noise music – trend in orchestral, rock, and electronic music where harsh, non-melodic, and often random sounds are used alongside or in place of conventional sounds.
- Noise pop – a style of alternative rock in which noises and feedback are used, but made into a melodic, often relaxing sound usually found in pop music.
- Noise rock – loud, atonal, dissonant, and unconventional rock music that was developed out of punk rock.
- Nordic folk music – folk music of the Nordic people.
- Nortec – Mexican EDM.
- Norteño – a style of Mexican folk music developed in Northern Mexico characterized by its polka tempo and its socially relevant lyrics.
- Northern soul – soul music made by Northern English.
- Novelty songs – songs built upon a novel concept, such as a gimmick, a piece of humor, or a sample of popular culture.
- Nu-disco – a French house-led revival of disco that occurred in the 21st-century.
- Nu-funk
- Nu gaze – a new style of shoegaze.
- Nu jazz – modern jazz music that borrows from funk and EDM.
- Nu metal – a style of alternative metal that borrows elements from other genres (especially hip-hop) and is known for its usage of down-tuned seven-string guitars, angst-filled lyrics that are delivered via screaming and/or rapping, and occasionally featuring a DJ to provide instrumentation such as sampling and turntable scratching.
- Nu skool breaks – a more abstract and technical style of breakbeat.
- Nueva canción
- Nuevo tango

== O ==
- Obscuro
- Obikhod – a collection of liturgical chants used by the Russian Orthodox Church; tends to be polyphonic.
- Oi! – 1980s style of British punk rock.
- Old-school hip-hop – a term for hip-hop recorded before approximately 1984; this style tended to have simpler rapping techniques with lyrics that generally focused on party-related subject matter, resulting in songs that are much longer than those created by later hip-hop artists.
- Old Roman chant – plainsong used during the Roman rite.
- Old-time music – archaic term for many different styles that were an outgrowth of Appalachian folk music and fed into country music.
- Oldies and Classic hits – popular music from the 1950s-2000s.
- Olonkho – Yakut epic songs.
- Old Time Radio – Old Time Radio Shows from the 1930s – 1960s.
- Ondo
- Opera – theatrical performances in which all or most dialogue is sung with musical accompaniment.
- Operatic pop – style of pop music that is performed in a classical operatic style (also referred to as "Popera").
- Operetta – a light and playful form of theatre music that came out of opera.
- Oratorio – similar to opera but without scenery, costumes or acting.
- Orchestral pop – pop music performed or backed by an orchestra; considered a style of easy listening.
- Organ trio – a style of jazz from the 1960s that blended blues and jazz (and later "soul jazz") and which was based around the sound of the Hammond organ.
- Organic ambient music – often acoustic ambient music which uses instruments and styles borrowed from world music.
- Organum – Middle Ages polyphonic music.
- Oriental metal – a style of folk metal that incorporates elements of traditional Middle Eastern music.
- Orthodox – the choral music produced by the Greek and Russian Orthodox churches.
- Ottava rima – Italian rhyming stanzas.
- Ottoman military band – the oldest variety of military marching band in the world.
- Outlaw country – a late 1960s and 70s style of country music with a hard-edged rock sound and rebellious contemporary folk lyrics.
- Outsider music – music performed by outsiders.

== P ==
=== Pa-Ph ===
- P-Funk – funk created and performed by George Clinton and his bands Parliament (which usually played regular funk) and Funkadelic (which usually played a mix of psychedelic funk and funk rock).
- Pachanga – a mixture of son montuno and merengue.
- Pagan metal
- Pagan rock – rock music (usually alternative rock) with pagan themes.
- Pagode – Brazilian style of music which originated in the Rio de Janeiro region.
- Paisley Underground – 1980s style of alternative rock that drew heavily on psychedelic music and jangle pop.
- Pakistani hip-hop – American hip-hop style beats with Pakistani poetry.
- Palm wine music – a fusion of numerous West African, Latin American and European genres, popular throughout coastal West Africa in the 20th century.
- Panambih – tembang sunda that uses metered poetry.
- Panchai baja – Nepalese wedding music.
- Panchavadyam – temple music from Kerala, India.
- Pansori – Korean folk music played by a singer and a drummer.
- Paraguayan polka
- Paranda music – Garifuna style of music.
- Parranda – Afro-Venezuelan style of music.
- Parody music – humorous renditions of existing songs or styles.
- Pambiche (Merengue estilo yanqui)
- Parang – Trinidadian Christmas carols.
- Partido alto
- Pasacalle
- Pasillo
- Pasodoble
- Payada
- Peace Punk
- Pelimanni music – Finnish folk dance music.
- Persian traditional music
- Peruvian cumbia – also known as chicha music.
- Petenera
- Peyote Song – a mixture of gospel and traditional Native American music.
- Philadelphia soul – soft 1970s soul that came out of Philadelphia, Pennsylvania.
- Phonk - is a subgenre of hip-hop and trap music directly inspired by 1990s Memphis rap.

=== Pi-Pl ===
- Pibroch – a type of music involving the Scottish bagpipes, typically using complex variations of a theme, like for service or ceremonies.
- Piedmont blues – a style of blues that originated on the East Coast of the United States. Characterized by syncopated fingerpicked guitar playing and ragtime-based rhythms.
- Pilipino – music that was created in the Philippines.
- Pimba – origin: Portugal.
- Pinoy rock – rock and roll sung in Tagalog from the Philippines.
- Pinpeat orchestra
- Piphat – ancient style of Thai classical ensemble.
- Pirate metal – mix of heavy metal and pirate music.
- Piyyutim
- Plainsong – chants used in the liturgies of the Western Church.
- Plena
- Pleng phua cheewit – Thai protest rock.
- Pleng Thai sakorn – a Thai interpretation of Western classical music.
- Plugg music - a sub-genre of trap music that emerged in the mid-2010s via online distribution on the SoundCloud platform.
- PluggnB – combines plugg production with melodic, dreamy contemporary R&B synths.
- Plus 8 – features sped-up NY garage 4-to-the-floor rhythms that are combined with breakbeats. Snares are placed over the 2nd and 4th kickdrums, so in other places of the drum pattern.

=== Po-Pp ===
- Political hip-hop – hip-hop with political (usually left-wing and/or black nationalist)-themed lyrics; the direct successor to conscious hip-hop.
- Polka – Czech-originated genre of folk dance music popular in many European countries.
- Polo – Venezuelan folk music.
- Polonaise
- Pols – Danish fiddle and accordion dance music.
- Polska
- Pong lang
- Pop folk
- Pop music – a genre of popular music that is specifically designed to have wide appeal, usually by having catchy hooks, simple beats and melodies, clean production and vocals, and lyrics that usually center on love and romantic relationships (frequently the adolescence versions of these topics).
- Pop-punk – a style of punk rock that contains elements of pop music, particularly its catchy hooks, simple melodies, and clean production. Pop punk also shares pop's adolescence themes, although said themes are mostly written from a comedic, punk point of view and usually delve into topics frequently avoided in pop, such as teenage drunkenness and drug usage.
- Pop rap
- Pop rock – a fusion of rock music and pop music; usually contains pop song structures and rock instrumentation.
- Pop sunda – Sundanese mixture of gamelan degung and pop music structures.
- Popular music – any music with wide appeal that is typically distributed to large audiences through the music industry.
- Pornocore
- Pornogrind – grindcore that focuses on pornographic topics.
- Porno music - Music that is played in X rated films.
- Porro – Colombian big band music.
- Post-bop – jazz made after the 1950s following the decline of bebop that has elements of hard bop, modal jazz, avant-garde jazz and free jazz.
- Post-Britpop – British alternative rock made after 1997 following the decline of Britpop.
- Post-dubstep
- Post-disco – a style of dance music that contains clear elements of disco but was made after Disco Demolition Night.
- Post-grunge – a grunge-inspired style that strips away that genre's mainstream-unfriendly elements (i.e. its introspective lyrics and abrasive tone) and replaces them with a cleaner production and lyrics about relationships.
- Post-hardcore – a hardcore punk-inspired style that explores approaches beyond the genre's conventions.
- Post-industrial – umbrella term for genres inspired by and that feature industrial music elements.
- Post-metal – a heavy metal style that explores approaches beyond the genre's conventions.
- Post-minimalism
- Postmodern music – can refer to any music made in the postmodern era, although its usage is often limited to music (usually classical music, although the term has been applied to some popular musicians) inspired by postmodernism.
- Post-progressive
- Post-punk – a punk-inspired style that explores approaches beyond the genre's conventions.
- Post-punk revival – an alternative rock-led revival of post-punk that occurred between late 1990s to early 2000s; considered a style of electronic rock.
- Post-rock – a style of experimental rock that strips away every characteristic that defines the sound of rock music; considered a form of electronic rock.
- Post-romanticism
- Powada – Marathi Folk.
- Power electronics
- Power metal – a style of heavy metal with melodic vocals, symphonic context and fantastic or mythical lyrics.
- Power noise (or rhythmic noise)
- Power pop – a style of pop rock that combines the melodic hooks of the Beatles with the energetic performance of the Who.
- Power trio
- Powerviolence
- Pow-wow – Native American dance music.
- Ppongtchak – Korean pop music developed during the Japanese occupation.

=== Pr-Pu ===
- Praise song
- Program symphony
- Progressive electronic music
- Progressive folk music
- Progressive house
- Progressive metal – a style of heavy metal and progressive rock.
- Progressive metalcore
- Progressive music – music that attempts to expand existing stylistic boundaries associated with specific genres of music.
- Progressive pop – pop music that attempts to break with the genre's standard formula.
- Progressive rap
- Progressive rock – a style of rock music and an offshoot of psychedelic rock that abandoned standard rock traditions in favor of instrumentation and compositional techniques more frequently associated with jazz, folk music, and/or classical music.
- Progressive trance
- Proibidão - a subgenre of funk carioca music originating from the favelas of Rio de Janeiro where it began in the early 1990s as a parallel phenomenon to the growth of drug gangs in the many slums of the city.
- Prostopinije – a style of monodic church chant used by churches tied to the Rusyn people.
- Proto-punk – any style of garage rock that seems to contain elements of punk rock but was made before its actual existence.
- Psybient – a genre of electronic music that contains elements of ambient, downtempo, psychedelic trance, dub, world music, new wave, ethereal wave, and IDM.
- Psychedelic music – music that attempts to replicate the effects of and enhance the mind-altering experiences of hallucinogenic drugs; characterized by its disjunctive song structures, surreal lyrics, and its usage of Indian instruments (especially the sitar and tabla) and elaborate studio effects.
- Psychedelic folk – a psychedelic style of folk music (as in contemporary folk music) that adds folk instrumentation into psychedelic music; one of the three original forms of psychedelic music.
- Psychedelic funk – a style of funk that incorporates the psychedelic elements of psychedelic rock, particularly its disjunctive song structures and surreal lyrics.
- Psychedelic pop – a psychedelic style of pop music that replaces the disjunctive song structures and surreal lyrics found in psychedelic music with standard pop song structures and lyrics; one of the three original forms of psychedelic music.
- Psychedelic rock – a psychedelic style of rock music that adds electrical guitar distortion and feedback into psychedelic music; one of the three original forms of psychedelic music.
- Psychedelic soul – a style of soul music that incorporates the psychedelic elements of psychedelic rock, particularly its usage of electrical guitar distortion and feedback and elaborate studio effects. Unlike other forms of psychedelic music, psychedelic soul lyrics tend to be more political than surreal.
- Psychedelic trance (Psy-trance)
- Psychobilly.
- Psydub – a fusion genre of electronic music that has its roots in psychedelic trance, ambient and dub music.
- Pub rock – refers to two separate back-to-basics styles of rock music that were played in pubs during the 1970s: one originating from Australia that was largely a hard rock style, and the other originating from the United Kingdom whose emphasis on small venues, simple, fairly inexpensive recordings and indie record labels helped create the British punk rock scene.
- Pungmul – a Korean folk music tradition that includes drumming, dancing, and singing.
- Punk blues – a style of blues rock that fuses blues with punk rock.
- Punk Cabaret – a fusion of musical theater and cabaret style music with the aggressive, raw nature of punk rock.
- Punk jazz – a style of punk rock that incorporates elements of free jazz, particularly its instrumentation and the heavy emphasis of jazz improvisation.
- Punk rock – a style of rock music known for its raw and distorted sound, usually fast and short songs, and frank and confrontational lyrics.
- Punta
- Punta rock – 1970s Belizean music.
- Puya – traditional music style from Colombia.

== Q ==
- Quan ho – Vietnamese vocal music which originated in the Red River Delta.
- Qasidah – epic religious poetry accompanied by percussion and beautiful vocals.
- Qasidah modern – Qasidah updated for mainstream audiences.
- Qawwali – Sufi religious music updated for mainstream audiences, originated in India.
- Qin - Post-ancient music performed on the qin.
- Quadrille
- Queercore
- Quiet Storm – music in the early 70s that started out as a style created by bands like The Temptations, The Smiths Connection, and Minnie Riperton that spawned a whole radio format. This style is very melodious with very smooth voices and mellow tones that evoke something either sensual or sentimental.

== R ==
- Raga rock – a fusion of rock music and Indian music; related to Indian rock, the term is usually only applied to Western rock musicians (including those of Indian descent) incorporating Indian elements (such as its usage of drone and the sitar) into their sound.
- Raga
- Rage music - a microgenre of trap music.
- Raggamuffin (Ragga)
- Ragga Jungle
- Ragtime – a style of music known for its syncopated or "ragged" rhythm.
- Rai – Algerian folk music now developed into a popular style.
- Raicore
- Raï'n'B
- Rake-and-scrape – Bahamanian instrumental music.
- Ramkbach
- Ramvong
- Ranchera – pop mariachi from 1950s film soundtracks.
- Rapping – a musical form of vocal delivery where the lyrics are spoken (usually in time with the music) rather than sung.
- Rapso – a poetic "rap" form of Trinbagonian music—the next evolutionary step of Calypso and Soca.
- Rap metal – a style of rap rock and alternative metal which combines hip-hop (largely its usage of rapping) with heavy metal music.
- Rap rock – a fusion of hip-hop and rock music; usually contains rock instrumentation and hip-hop vocals and beats.
- Rara music
- Rare groove – Gujarati music and dance.
- Rare phonk
- Rasiya
- Ravanahatha – Ravana music.
- Rave music – any music (usually electronic dance music) that is usually played in raves.
- Rebetiko
- Red Dirt (music)
- reel
- Reggae – a Jamaican music genre that is known for its offbeat rhythm (particularly the one drop rhythm and ska stroke) and Rastafarian-influenced lyrics.
- Reggae fusion
- Reggae highlife
- Reggaeton – a fusion genre developed in Puerto Rico that combines reggae and hip-hop.
- Rekilaulu – Finnish rhyming sleigh songs.
- Religious music – music performed or composed for religious use or through religious influence.
- Renaissance music
- Retro
- Requiem music
- Rhapsody
- Rhumba
- Rhyming spiritual – Bahamanian hymns.
- Rhythm and blues – an offshoot of jump blues characterized by its heavy, insistent beat that was an immediate predecessor of rock and roll.
- Rhythm & grime – a mix of grime with R&B, showcasing a softer side of grime, often with accompanying R&B vocals, while keeping the 140bpm rugged sound of grime.
- Ricercar
- Riddim – a subgenre of dubstep known for its heavy use of repetitive and minimalist sub-bass and triplet percussion arrangements.
- Rímur – Icelandic heroic epic songs.
- Ringbang – a Caribbean fusion of music genres, a philosophy, and an aesthetic propounded by Eddy Grant in 1994.
- Riot grrrl – a hardcore punk movement led by women that is heavily associated with third-wave feminism.
- RnBass – a fusion of contemporary R&B music with hip-hop production style, known as ratchet music, coined by DJ Mustard.
- Road rap – a mix of gangsta rap with grime, dubstep, UK garage, jungle music, reggae, and dub music.
- Rock music – a broad offshoot of rock and roll that is typically characterized by a basic backbeat, 4/4 riffs, and is musically centered on the (usually electric) guitar, bass guitar, drums and vocals, although there are numerous styles within rock where this characterization does not apply.
- Rock opera – a collection of rock music songs with lyrics that relate to a common story.
- Rock and roll – a popular music genre that combines blues (via rhythm and blues) and country music and is known for strong backbeat, its complete dominance within 1950s youth culture, and being the predecessor of rock music.
- Rock en español
- Rockabilly – a style of rock and roll that tends to have a stronger country influence than usual.
- Rocksteady
- Rococo
- Rōkyoku
- Romani music
- Romantic period in music
- Ronggeng – a folk music from Malacca, Malaysia.
- Roots reggae
- Roots rock – rock music that looks back to rock's origins in folk music, blues and country music, usually by combining all three with modern rock.
- Roots rock reggae
- Rumba – vigorous Afro-Cuban music created for ballroom dancing.

== Previous sections ==
- Section A–F | Section G–M

== Next section ==
- Section S–Z
