= List of styles of music: G–M =

This is a partial list of music genres and styles, covering entries from the letters G to M.

For the other sections, see Section A–F, Section N–R and Section S–Z.

== G ==
=== Gaa-Gal ===
- G-funk – a style of gangsta rap that heavily uses P-Funk samples (largely recreated and not directly taken from P-funk records) in their music.
- Gaana – upbeat Tamil dance song performed at celebrations.
- Gabber – a faster, more anarchistic, style of house music designed to counter the pretentious Dutch house scene of the 1980s.
- Gagaku – any Japanese classical music played for the Imperial Court.
- Ghana – counterpoint guitar music from Malta, with improvised lyrics.
- Gaita Zuliana – diverse style of Venezuelan folk.
- Galant – intentionally simplistic style of Western classical music designed to counter the increasingly complex Baroque music of the 18th century.
- Gallican chant – plainsong used during the Gallican rite.

=== Gam-Gan ===
- Gamelan – Indonesian classical music.
- Gamelan bebonangan – Balinese style of gamelan that utilizes a 7-tone scale and cymbals.
- Gamelan degung – Sundanese style of gamelan that uses the pegog scale.
- Gamelan gong kebyar – Balinese style of gamelan known for its explosive changes in tempo.
- Gamelan salendro – West Javan gamelan.
- Gamelan selunding – Balinese style of gamelan.
- Gamelan semar pegulingan – Balinese style of gamelan.
- Gammaldans – wide variety of traditional Nordic dance music, and modernized versions created by Nordic-Americans.
- Gandrung – traditional Indonesian dance music.
- Gangsta rap – a West Coast offshoot of hardcore hip-hop characterized by themes and lyrics that generally emphasize the "gangsta" lifestyle.

=== Gar-Gav ===
- Gar – Tibetan chanting and dancing.
- Garba – Gujarati music and dance.
- Garage house – heavily polished style of American house.
- Garage rock – a raw and energetic style of rock and roll, often practiced by high school bands in garages.
- Garage rock revival – a music revival of garage rock that occurred in the early 2000s.
- Gato – style of music folk dance popular in Argentina and Uruguay.
- Gavotte – traditional French dance music.

=== Ge-Gn ===
- Gender wayang – Balinese style of gamelan.
- Geek rock – alternative rock with geeky themes.
- Gelineau psalmody – a style of plainsong developed by Joseph Gelineau that uses regular metre unlike other plainsongs.
- Ghazal – Arabic (particularly Pakistani) angst-ridden poetry, often accompanied by music.
- Ghettotech – fusion of Chicago house, Miami bass, electro, glitch, and techno.
- Girl group – any all-female pop or rock group.
- Glam metal – a style of heavy metal music popular in the 1980s characterized by its pop music hooks, hard rock-inspired guitar riffs, and glam rock-influenced fashion; pejoratively labeled as hair metal.
- Glam punk – fusion of glam and punk rock.
- Glam rock – a style of rock music which included heavy themes of gender-bending and androgyny.
- Glitch – style of EDM based around samples of malfunctioning technology in order to create an intentionally harsh sound.
- Gnawa music – Islamic African religious music.

=== Go-Gr ===
- Go-go – style of funk known for its syncopated rhythms and call-and-response vocals.
- Goa trance – fusion of trance music and traditional Indian styles.
- Gong chime – any music performed with high-pitched pot gongs, usually Southeast Asian styles.
- Goombay – Bahamian drum music.
- Goregrind – style of grindcore known for its lyrical focus on gore and forensics.
- Goshu ondo – traditional Japanese dance music from the Meiji era.
- Gospel music – a style of music derived from spirituals that is known for its strong use of harmony and its usage of call and response.
- Gospel blues – a fusion of gospel music and blues.
- Gothic country – a style of country music rooted in early jazz, gospel, Americana, gothic rock and post-punk.
- Gothic metal – fusion of gothic rock and heavy metal.
- Gothic rock – an offshoot of post-punk that is heavily inspired by Gothic art.
- Gothabilly – a music style influenced by rockabilly and goth subculture.
- Gqom – style of house music from South Africa.
- Gqom trap - a fusion of gqom and trap music elements, emerged in the 2010s through the innovation of Durban hip-hop group Witness The Funk.
- Grebo – a short-lived British style of alternative rock from the 1990s.
- Gregorian chant – the central plainsong used by the Roman Catholic Church that is said to have been developed by Pope Gregory I; sung in monophonic voices.
- Grime – fusion of hip-hop and UK garage.
- Grindcore – fusion of death metal and hardcore punk.
- Grindie – a fusion of indie rock or alternative rock and grime music.
- Griot – music performed by West African storytellers.
- Groove metal – a style of heavy metal music that took elements of thrash, but played at mid-tempo, making a slower, groovier sound.
- Group Sounds – Japanese pop from the 1960s, inspired heavily by British beat and American bubblegum pop.
- Grunge – a style of alternative rock that is heavily influenced by punk rock and heavy metal music and is known for its heavily distorted guitars and angst-ridden lyrics.
- Grupera – American rock-inspired Mexican rock.

=== Gu-Gy ===
- Guarania – Paraguayan music style also popular in Brazil.
- Guajira – Cuban country music, performed in rural communities.
- Gumbe – Guinea-Bissaun folk music.
- Gunchei – Central American music played to accompany the garifauna dance of the same name.
- Gunka – Japanese military music.
- Guoyue – modernized Chinese traditional music.
- Gwo ka – Guadaloupean drum music.
- Gwo ka moderne – modernized style of gwo ka.
- Gypsy jazz – Roma-French style of jazz.
- Gypsy punk – Romani style of punk rock.

== H ==
=== Ha ===
- Habanera – African-American style based on Cuban contradanza.
- Halling – Norwegian folk music made to accompany the dance of the same name.
- Hambo – Swedish folk music made to accompany the dance of the same name.
- Hamburger Schule – style of alternative rock based in Hamburg, Germany.
- Happy hardcore – incredibly fast, upbeat, and optimistic style of hardcore techno.
- Haqibah – Sudanese a capella music.
- Harawi
- Hard bop – a style of bebop that contains gospel music harmonies, rhythm and blues (as in the blues style) rhythms, and regular blues melodies.
- Hard house – fusion of hardstyle and house music.
- Hard rock – a loud, distorted style and an offshoot of blues rock. hard rock usually maintains the bluesy elements of rock music.
- Hard trance – a heavy, reverberating style of trance music.
- Hardcore hip-hop – an aggressive and confrontational style of hip-hop that originated from the East Coast.
- Hardcore punk – aggressive and confrontational style of punk music.
- Hardcore – a style of electronic dance music that originated from techno known for distorted, industrial-esque beats.
- Hardstep – gritty, heavy style of drum & bass.
- Hardstyle – intense, heavy style of EDM known for its heavy kick-drums and reversed basslines.
- Hardvapour - an Internet-based microgenre of music that emerged in late 2015 as a tongue-in-cheek response to vaporwave, departing from the calm, muzak-sampling capitalist utopia concept of the latter in favor of a gabber- and punk-influenced sound.
- Hardwave - a fusion of wave music with trance and hardstyle
- Hasapiko – Greek folk dance music, originating in Constantinople.
- Hát tuồng (Hát bôi) – Vietnamese opera.

=== He-Ho ===
- Heartland rock – a style of roots rock known for its straightforward rock and roll sound and its concern with the American working class.
- Heavy hardcore – a mix of hardcore punk and heavy metal.
- Heavy metal music – a technically proficient, aggressive style of music similar to metal except not very smooth, heavy metal music usually abandons the bluesy elements of rock music.
- Hi-NRG – an electronic, uptempo style of disco known for a reverberating, four-on-the-floor rhythm.
- Hill country blues – a style of country blues developed in Northern Mississippi which puts strong emphasis on rhythm and percussion, steady guitar riffs, few chord changes, unconventional song structures, and heavy emphasis on the "groove".
- Highlife – Ghanaian style that married traditional African forms with Western pop.
- Hiplife – a style of music influenced by Highlife and other Ghanaian musical traditions.
- Hip-hop production – music production for hip-hop.
- Hip-hop – a popular music genre where lyrics are rapped rather than sung and are musically backed by a sampled loop provided by a DJ.
- Hip house – fusion of hip-hop and house music.
- Hip-hop soul – a subgenre of contemporary R&B music, most popular during the early and mid 1990s, which fuses R&B or soul singing with hip-hop musical production.
- Hindustani classical music – Northern Indian classical music.
- Hiragasy – style of music and dance performed by troupes of relatives for day-long periods by the Merina people of Madagascar.
- Hoerspiel – music scores from original German radio dramas.
- Honky-tonk – a crisp, clean style of country music that is usually played in honky-tonks.
- Hokum – a comedic version of blues where lyrics are centered on making sexual innuendos.
- Honkyoku – religious music performed by Japanese Zen Buddhists.
- Hookah rap - a genre of Russian rap or Russian pop which originated in Russia during the mid-2010s and popularized across the post-Soviet countries in the late 2010s.
- Hora – Romani folk music.
- Hora lungă – improvisational Romani folk music.
- Hornpipe – music played to accompany the British naval dance of the same name.
- Horrorcore – hip-hop known for dark, horror-inspired lyrics.
- Horror punk – punk that is lyrically inspired by 1950s horror B-movies, often in an ironic way.
- House music – a relaxed, electronic dance music offshoot of disco characterized by repetitive 4/4 beats, rhythms provided by drum machines, off-beat hi-hat cymbals, and synthesized basslines.

=== Hu-Hy ===
- Huayño – Peruvian folk music.
- Hula – Hawaiian folk music made to accompany the dance of the same name.
- Humppa – Finnish jazz style.
- Hunguhungu – folk music performed by Garifuna women.
- Hyangak – Korean court music from the Three Kingdoms period.
- Hymn – any religious song.
- Hyperpop - a loosely defined electronic music movement and microgenre that predominantly originated in the United Kingdom during the early 2010s.
- Hyphy – fast-paced style of hip-hop from the San Francisco Bay Area.

== I ==
- Icaro – music sung in healing ceremonies of the Shipibo-Conibo people of Peru.
- IDM – more experimental and intellectual style of electronica so called to distinguish itself from the commercialist trends in rave music.
- Igbo music – any music performed by the Igbo people of Nigeria.
- Illbient – style of music inspired by dub music in its use of layering and hip-hop in its use of sampling.
- Impressionist music – style of Western art music inspired by the visual arts movement of the same name.
- Improvised – any music that is made impromptu.
- Incidental music – music played in the background of a film or play.
- Indian rock – rock music performed by Indians that usually incorporates elements of Indian music into it; related to raga rock, the term Indian rock is usually only applied to Indian rock musicians currently living in India.
- Indietronica – a fusion of indie rock and EDM.
- Indie folk – a fusion of indie rock and folk music.
- Independent music – any music made outside of major record labels. Independent music that is specifically formed around an idea of remaining on the underground and a DIY ethic is referred to as indie music.
- Indie pop – a melodic, often angst-free and optimistic, style of pop music associated with the indie music scene; related with indie rock.
- Indie rock – an alternative rock style linked to the indie music scene.
- Indigenous music of North America – any music made by the Indigenous peoples of North America.
- Indigenous rock – a style of music which mixes rock music with the instrumentation and singing styles of Indigenous peoples.
- Indo jazz – fusion of jazz and traditional Indian music.
- Industrial death metal – a style of industrial metal that fuses industrial music with death metal.
- Industrial hip-hop – fusion of industrial and hip-hop music.
- Industrial music – an experimental style of electronic music inspired by punk rock which draws harsh, transgressive or provocative sounds and themes.
- Industrial musical – musical theater performed by the workers of a company to promote teamwork.
- Industrial metal – a fusion of industrial music and heavy metal music; usually has heavy metal vocals, guitar riffs and industrial instrumentation.
- Industrial rock – a style of alternative rock that fuses the harsh musical sounds of industrial music with rock music instrumentation.
- Industrial thrash metal – a style of industrial metal that fuses industrial music with thrash metal.
- Instrumental – music that has no lyrics.
- Instrumental hip-hop – hip-hop that features little to no rapping.
- Instrumental rock – rock music that features little to no singing.
- Inuit music – any music performed by the Inuit of Greenland and Canada.
- Irish traditional music – folk music of the Irish people; part of the Celtic music umbrella.
- Irish rebel music – Irish folk with an emphasis on Irish republicanism.
- Isicathamiya – a capella style of singing used by the Zulu people of South Africa.
- Islamic music
- Italo dance – an optimistic style of Eurodance that developed in Italy.
- Italo disco – style of disco developed in Italy that led to the creation of modern EDM.
- Italo house – Italian house music that followed on from Italo disco.

== J ==
=== Ja-Je ===
- J-pop – pop music made by Japanese performers.
- Jaipongan – music made to accompany the dance of the same name of Sundanese people of Indonesia.
- Jam band – a type of band (usually a rock band) that plays long instrumental, often improvised, tracks called 'jams'.
- Jam session – musical improvisation within the context of popular music (i.e. rock).
- Jamaican folk music – folk music originating from Jamaica.
- Jamrieng samai – Cambodian pop music.
- Jangle pop
- Japanese rock – rock music made by Japanese performers.
- Japanoise – noise music from Japan.
- Jarana yucateca – traditional Yucatán dance music.
- Jarocho – Mexican dance and song style from Veracruz.
- Jawaiian – fusion of Hawaiian traditional music and reggae.
- Jazz – a form of music (usually considered a type of popular music, although some forms can be considered art music) that originated in the late 19th and early 20th century in the Southern United States and is known for its heavy use of musical improvisation and brass instruments (especially the saxophone and trumpet).
- Jazzcore
- Jazz improvisation – musical improvisation within the context of jazz.
- Jazz-funk – fusion of jazz and funk music.
- Jazz fusion – a style that incorporates rock elements (particularly its backbeat and usage of the electric guitar) into its music.
- Jazz rap – a fusion of jazz and hip-hop; usually contains jazz instrumentation (either played live or sampled from older jazz recordings) and hip-hop rhythms.
- Jazz rock – a fusion of jazz and rock music. Sometimes used interchangeably with jazz fusion, jazz rock is usually seen as being a rock style that incorporates jazz elements (particularly its usage of improvisation and brass instruments) into its music.
- Jegog – gamelan played with bamboo-based instruments.
- Jenkka – Finnish folk dance music.
- Jersey club - a style of electronic club music that originated in Newark, New Jersey, in the early 2000s.
- Jersey club rap/drill - a fusion of Jersey club and Drill music.
- Jesus music – style of CCM developed by the American hippie-based Jesus Movement.
- Jewish – music made and performed by Jews talking about subjects like Jewish teachings, life, love and many other things. Usually they are in Hebrew or English.

=== Ji-Ju ===
- Jig – uptempo Irish folk dance music.
- Jing ping – Dominican folk dance music developed by slaves during European colonialism.
- Jingle – short, catchy song used in advertising.
- Jit – Zimbabwean pop music.
- Jitterbug – any music that accompanies the dance of the same name.
- Jive – swing music used to accompany the African-American ballroom dance of the same name.
- Joged – Balinese dance music.
- Joged bumbung – fusion of gamelan and joged.
- Joik – style of Sami folk music.
- Joropo – Venezuelan waltz.
- Jota – Spanish folk dance music.
- Jug band – a band that plays a style of African-American folk music using household objects such as jugs, spoons, and washboards.
- Jùjú music – Nigerian pop music.
- Juke – faster than Ghetto House, playing at 160bpm, and makes striking use of unconventional drum patterns which differ wildly from other house styles.
- Jump blues – an uptempo, style of boogie-woogie played with horns and swing music rhythms.
- Jumpstyle – faster style of progressive house.
- Jungle music – a style of breakbeat hardcore known for fast tempo, breakbeats, samples, and for being the immediate predecessor of drum and bass.
- Junkanoo – Bahamas folk dance music.

== K ==
=== Ka ===
- K-pop – pop music made by Korean performers.
- Kabuki – style of Japanese musical theatre known for its elaborate make-up and costuming.
- Kagok – Korean folk music.
- Kaiso – a style of Trinidadian music originating from Igbo and Kongo slaves that later developed into calypso music.
- Kalamatianó – Greek folk music.
- Kan ha diskan – Breton folk music.
- Kanikapila – Hawaiian music.
- Kansas City blues – blues performed by Kansas City inhabitants.
- Kantrum – fast-paced Khmer-Thai folk music.
- Kargyraa – deep, growling style of Tuvan throat singing.
- Kaseko – Surinamese music that fuses African, European, and American styles.
- Kachāshī – fast-paced Ryukyuan festive folk music.
- Kawachi ondo – Japanese folk music from the Osaka region.
- Kawaii metal – fusion of heavy metal and J-pop.
- Kawaii future bass (also known simply as kawaii bass) — subgenre of future bass, known for its happy and cute timbre and strong Japanese pop culture influences.
- Kayōkyoku – an early style of J-Pop.

=== Ke-Kh ===
- Kecak – Balinese folk opera.
- Kacapi suling – Sundanese folk music.
- Kertok – Malay musical ensemble utilizing xylophones.
- Khaleeji – Arab folk music.
- Khene – Malay woodwind music.
- Khyal – North Indian style of Hindustani classical music.

=== Ki-Kp ===
- Kievan chant – a liturgical chant common in churches that have their roots in the Moscow Patriarchate; part of the Obikhod.
- Kirtan – Indian drum music performed during Hindu bhakti rituals.
- Kiwi rock – rock music performed by New Zealanders.
- Kizomba – Angolan dance music.
- Klapa – Croatian a capella music.
- Klasik – Afghan classical music.
- Klezmer – Jewish classical music.
- Kolomyjka – tongue-in-cheek Hutsul folk dance music.
- Komagaku – Japanese court music from the Heian period.
- Kpanlogo – Ghanan folk dance music.

=== Kr-Kw ===
- Krakowiak – fast-paced Polish folk dance music.
- Krautrock – a German style of experimental rock that largely replaced the blues influences of psychedelic rock with electronic music; considered a form of electronic rock.
- Kriti – Indian classical music.
- Kroncong – Indonesian folk music utilizing the ukulele.
- Kuduro – Angolan folk music.
- Kulintang – ancient gong music of the Filipinos, Indonesians, Malays, Bruneian, and Timorese.
- Kundiman – Filipino love songs.
- Kvæði – Icelandic folk music.
- Kwaito – South African music from the 90s with quick tempos.
- Kwassa kwassa – Congolese folk dance music.
- Kwela – South African skiffle music.

== L ==
=== La ===
- Laiko – Greek folk dance music.
- Lambada – Brazilian dance music.
- Landó
- Latin alternative – alternative rock informed by traditional Latin American styles.
- Latin hip-hop – hip-hop performed by Latino Americans.
- Latin jazz – jazz that incorporates rhythms from Latin music.
- Latin metal – a genre of heavy metal with Latin origins, influences, and instrumentation, such as Spanish vocals, Latin percussion, and rhythm such as Salsa rhythm.
- Latin music – catch-all term for Spanish- and Portuguese-language popular music.
- Latin pop – used either as a catch-all term for any pop music from the Spanish-speaking world, or as a specific term for a fusion of pop music and Latin music.
- Latino punk – punk rock performed by Latino Americans.
- Latin R&B – a style of R&B that originated in Latin America and the United States.
- Latin rock – used either as a term for Spanish- and Portuguese-language rock music, or as a specific term for a style of rock music that incorporates elements found in Latin music.
- Latin soul – very soulful music with Latin elements.
- Latin trap - a subgenre of Latin hip-hop music that originated in Puerto Rico. A direct descendant of Southern hip-hop and trap, and influenced by reggaeton, R&B and urbano music, it gained popularity after 2007, and has since spread throughout Latin America.
- Lavani – style of traditional Indian music performed in Maharashtra.

=== Le-Lo ===
- Legényes – Hungarian and Romanian folk dance music performed by the inhabitants of Transylvania, now modern-day Cluj-Napoca.
- Letkajenkka – Finnish folk dance music.
- Lhamo – Tibetan folk opera.
- Lied – German poems spoken to music.
- Light music – soft, non-confrontational British orchestral music.
- Liquid funk – style of drum and bass with a heavy emphasis on melody.
- Lo-fi music – any music recorded at a quality lower than usual.
- Logobi – style of zouglou influenced by the French colonists in the Ivory Coast.
- Loncomeo – musical style from the Tehuelche people in Argentina.
- Long song – Mongolian folk music in which each syllable is extended for a longer than average period of time.
- Louisiana blues – blues performed by inhabitants of the state of Louisiana.
- Lounge music – downtempo music intended to give the listener a sense of being somewhere else, i.e. a jungle or outer space.
- Lovers rock – style of reggae fusion known for its romantic lyrics.
- Lowercase – an extreme, minimalist style of ambient music consisting of long periods of silence and occasional, very minute sounds.

=== Lu ===
- Lubbock sound – fusion of rock and roll and country music from Lubbock, Texas.
- Luk Krung – more polished style of luk thung.
- Luk thung – Thai folk music.
- Lullaby – soothing song sung to young children to lull them to sleep.
- Lundu – harmonious style of Afro-Brazilian music.

== M ==
=== M-Mam ===
- M-Base – style of musical thought and composition developed by Steve Coleman.
- Madchester – a music scene developed in Manchester that combined alternative rock with acid house. The music itself is often referred to as baggy.
- Madrigal – style of classical singing popular in the Renaissance and Baroque eras.
- Mafioso rap – an East Coast style of gangsta rap that focuses on organize crime (i.e. the Mafia) rather than street gang activities.
- Mahori – style of Thai and Khmer classical music.
- Mainstream hardcore – a subgenre of hardcore techno.
- Makossa – Cameroonian pop.
- Mallsoft - a vaporwave subgenre centered around shopping malls.
- Maloya – style of folk developed by the slaves on the French territory of Reunion.
- Malambo – Argentine and Uruguayan style of folk music dance.
- Mambo – a Cuban style of swing music.

=== Man-Map ===
- Manaschi – Kyrgyz song recital of the Epic of Manas.
- Mandopop – style of C-pop sung in the Mandarin language.
- Manele – Romani folk music.
- Mangue bit – a Brazilian electronic music genre played in a fast-paced, alternative rock-informed style.
- Manila Sound – fusion of Western rock music and traditional Filipino folk music.
- Mapouka – traditional folk dance music of the Aizi, Alladian, and Avikam people of the Ivory Coast.

=== Mar-Maz ===
- Marabi – South African style informed by blues and jazz.
- Maracatu – Brazilian folk dance music.
- March
- Mariachi – fusion of Mexican folk music and pop music.
- Marrabenta – Mozambican folk dance music informed by Portuguese styles.
- Martial industrial – style of neo-folk informed by military marches and militaristic themes.
- Martial music – music intended for use in military settings.
- Maskanda – South African folk music.
- Marinera – romantic Peruvian folk dance music.
- Martinetes – a capella flamenco music.
- Mashup – blend of two or more pre-recorded songs.
- Mass – Christian hymns sung by large vocal groups.
- Matamuerte – Garifuna folk dance music.
- Mathcore – fusion of metalcore and math rock.
- Math rock – a rhythmically complex and experimental style of indie rock.
- Maxixe – Brazilian folk dance music.
- Mazurka – Polish folk dance music.

=== Mb-Me ===
- Mbalax – Senegalese folk dance music that combines traditional sabar drumming techniques with jazz, soul, rock, and Latin music.
- Mbube – South African a cappella music.
- Meditation music – any music created to aid meditation procedures.
- Medieval folk rock – style of folk rock that incorporated elements of earlier folk traditions, such as Medieval, Renaissance, and Baroque music, despite what the name may suggest.
- Medieval metal – fusion of folk metal and Medieval folk rock.
- Medieval music – a period of Western art music ranging from the 6th to 15th centuries.
- Mejoranera – Panamanian guitar music.
- Malhun – North African style of classical music that borrows from Andalusian traditions.
- Melam – Indian drumming style.
- Melisma – a singing technique where a single syllable of text is sung through several different notes in succession.
- Melodic hardcore – style of hardcore punk known for its slower, melodic guitars, juxtaposed with shouted vocals.
- Melodic metalcore – fusion of melodic hardcore and metalcore.
- Melodic music – any music that utilizes melody, the combination of notes so that they are perceived as a single string of music.
- Memphis blues – a style of blues from Memphis.
- Memphis rap - a regional subgenre of hip-hop that originated in Memphis, Tennessee in the mid-late 1980s.
- Memphis soul – Southern soul from Memphis known for its sultry sound and melodic unison horn lines.
- Mento – a style of Jamaican folk music that later developed into ska; heavily conflated with calypso music.
- Merengue music – Dominican folk dance music.
- Merengue típico – style of modern merengue that attempts to sound similar to 19th century merengue.
- Méringue – Haitian guitar music.
- Metal music – driving and distorted riffs, aggressive drumming, and vigorous vocals.
- Metalcore – fusion of extreme metal and hardcore punk; often sung melodically.
- Mexican rock music – rock music performed by Mexicans.
- Meykhana – Azerbaijani spoken word music.
- Mezwed – Tunisian folk music.

=== Mia-Mil ===
- Miami bass – rave-inspired style of hip-hop.
- Microhouse – minimalist, stripped down style of house music.
- Microsound
- Middle Eastern music – music originating from the Middle East.
- Mini-jazz – rock-inspired meringue music.
- Minuet – French folk dance music.
- Milonga – Argentine and Uruguayan folk dance music.

=== Min ===
- Min'yō – Japanese folk music.
- Minimal music – a heavily experimental form of music known for its simplicity and repetitiveness. Usually refers to a style of postmodern classical music, although the term has been applied to some genres of popular music (particularly electronica).
- Minimal techno – fusion of techno and minimal music.
- Minstrel – American folk music which parodied African-American styles.
- Minneapolis sound – a style of funk rock performed and produced by Prince and his associates that contains many other musical elements, particularly new wave music.

=== Mo ===
- Modal jazz – jazz that uses musical modes rather than tonal scales and thinking as a framework.
- Modinha – Brazilian folk music.
- Modern rock – any rock music (usually alternative rock) made during or after the 1990s.
- Morenada – folk music and dance style from the Bolivian Andes.
- Mor lam – Laotian and Thai folk music.
- Mor lam sing – fast-paced, sexual, and modernized style of mor lam.
- Moombahton – fusion of electro house and reggaeton.
- Moombahcore – moombahton incorporating dubstep influences and elements of Dutch house.
- Motown – a style of music produced by and named after the famous record label that took elements of pop music (particularly its clean production and usage of catchy hooks) in order to gain mass crossover appeal.
- Montuno – loose term for Cuban music and its derivatives.
- Morna – Cape Verdean folk music.
- Mozambique
- Mozarabic chant – plainsong used during the Mozarabic rite.

=== Mu ===
- Mugham – Azerbaijan classical music.
- Mumble rap – a modern style of hip-hop characterized by simplistic and often unintelligible lyrics.
- Murga – Uruguayan, Argentinian and Spaniard theatrical music performed during carnival.
- Musette – French folk dance music.
- Mushroom Jazz – eclectic genre that draws from downtempo, hip-hop, and world styles.
- Music hall – English popular music of the 19th century.
- Música criolla – Peruvian music informed by African, European, and Andean styles.
- Musica llanero – Venezuelan and Colombian folk music.
- Música popular brasileira – loose term for Brazilian pop music.
- Musique concrète – heavily experimental orchestral music known for its use of electronic instruments.
- Muwashshah – Arabic musical poetry.
- Muzak – a style of music that is used in malls and elevators.

== Previous section ==
- Section A–F

== Next sections ==
- Section N–R | Section S–Z
