= Sato kagura =

Sato kagura (里神楽), or village kagura, is a popular form of kagura that presents ritualized dance-dramas reenacting mythological themes, including the primal restoration of sunlight to the world. It is often heard during festivals, when musicians accompany their songs on flutes and a variety of drums.

All forms of kagura other than mikagura, which is associated with the imperial court, can be considered sato kagura.

== See also ==
- Shinto
- Culture of Japan
- History of Japan
- Japanese mythology
- Jinja (Shinto)
- Libation
- Oomoto
- Religion in Japan
- Shinto music
- The Glossary of Shinto for an explanation of terms concerning Japanese Shinto, Shinto art, and Shinto shrine architecture.
