= Eremwu eu =

Eremwu eu is a work song sung by women as they make cassava bread, as part of the Garifuna music tradition of Belize, Guatemala and Honduras.
