= Gunchei =

Dance found in Mexican culture

Gunchei is a type of Central America Garifuna dance in which the men take turns dancing with each woman. "Gunchei" can also refer to the music that is played during the dance.
