= Pub rock =

Pub rock may refer to:

- Pub rock (Australia), a style of Australian rock and roll popular throughout the 1970s and 1980s influenced heavily by hard rock and blues rock.
- Pub rock (United Kingdom), a rock music genre that was developed in the mid-1970s in the United Kingdom and influenced heavily by 1960s music, such as garage rock and beat.
