= Combined rhythm =

Ritmo Kombina (Combined rhythm) is a style of popular Dutch Antillean music, influenced by zouk and soca music. The lyrics of combined rhythm are generally in the local Papiamento language.

== Performers ==
- Gibu i su Orkesta
- Expresando Rimto i Ambiente
- OK Band
- Happy Peanuts
