= Chicken scratch =

American indigenous dance music

Chicken scratch (also known as waila music) is a kind of dance music developed by the Tohono O'odham people. The genre evolved out of acoustic fiddle bands in southern Arizona, in the Sonoran Desert. These bands began playing European and Mexican tunes, in styles that include the polka, schottisch and mazurka.

Chicken scratch, however, is at its root an interpretation of norteño music, which is itself a Mexican adaptation of polka. Many chicken scratch bands still play polka songs with a distinctive flourish, and may also play the waltz or conjunto. Chicken scratch dance is based on the "walking two step or the walking polka and the emphasis is on a very smooth gliding movement"; dancers may also perform the mazurka or the chote, though no matter the style, it is always performed counterclockwise.

Chicken scratch is usually played with a band including alto saxophone, bass, guitar, drums and accordion, though the original style used only percussion, guitar and violin, with the accordion and saxophone added in the 1950s. Its home is the Tohono O'odham Indian Reservation, Salt River Pima-Maricopa Indian Community and Gila River Indian Community.

The term waila comes from Spanish bailar, meaning to dance. The term chicken scratch comes from a description of traditional Tohono O'odham dance, which involves kicking the heels high in the air, which supposedly bears a resemblance to a chicken scratching.

The most famous performers are likely the Joaquín Brothers, Los Papagos Molinas with Virgil Molina, and Southern Scratch. The Annual Waila Festival in Tucson, Arizona, is well-known, as is the Rock-A-Bye Music Fest in Casa Grande, Arizona. Canyon Records and Rock-A-Bye Records are the best known labels for the genre.

In 2011, a Best Waila category was added to the Native American Music Awards.
